= List of downloadable songs for the Rock Band series =

- Songs released: 2,784
- Packs released: 288
- Albums released: 25

The Rock Band series of music video games supports downloadable songs for the Xbox 360, Xbox One, PlayStation 3, PlayStation 4 and Wii versions through the consoles' respective online services. Harmonix typically provides three to six new tracks per week available to all consoles as listed below. From March 2010 until September 2014, authoring groups could submit their own tracks for peer review through the Rock Band Network.

Players can download songs on a track-by-track basis, with many of the tracks also offered as part of a "song pack" or complete album, usually at a discounted rate. Tracks released for Rock Band 2 on the Wii platform are only available as singles while Rock Band 3 offers multi-song packs as well as singles. Since on-disc songs are not available for download, some albums are incomplete. For example, the album Blood Sugar Sex Magik is available for download; it contains the song "Give it Away" on Rock Band 2 and Blitz, so the downloadable album does not include "Give it Away".

Most downloadable songs are playable within every game mode, including the Band World Tour career mode. All downloadable songs released prior to October 26, 2010, are cross-compatible among Rock Band, Rock Band 2, Rock Band 3, Rock Band Blitz, and Rock Band 4, while content released between October 26, 2010, and October 5, 2015, is compatible with the latter three titles only, and all content released on or after October 6, 2015, is only compatible with Rock Band 4. Also, certain pre-Rock Band 3 songs deemed "suitable for all ages" by Harmonix are also available for use in Lego Rock Band.

The Wii version of Rock Band did not support downloadable content; however, Rock Band 2 and Rock Band 3 do, with DLC first made available in January 2009. Harmonix has said it will continue to release songs from the back catalog of downloadable content each week for Wii until all songs are available, and starting in March 2009, is making new DLC available for Wii at the same time as Xbox 360 and PlayStation 3. All songs are available for download on Wii unless otherwise noted.

After more than 5 years of uninterrupted DLC releases, Harmonix ended its regular releases of DLC on April 2, 2013, as it transitioned to other games, with the final song being Don McLean's "American Pie". Although no new DLC was scheduled for release after that date, Harmonix did not rule out the possibility of releasing DLC in the future should the right opportunity arise. On January 12, 2015, Harmonix announced the first of one-off releases of new DLC. The sudden release, along with a survey posted by Harmonix a few days later, hinted at the possibility of a new Rock Band game for eighth generation consoles. Harmonix later confirmed Rock Band 4 on March 5, 2015, and the game was released on October 6, 2015, on Xbox One and PlayStation 4.

After the initial announcement, Harmonix intended to support the Rock Band Network for Xbox 360 so long as the backend tools were still supported; however, due to technical issues and the company allocating its resources to other projects, Harmonix terminated support for the RBN in September 2014. Additionally, RBN ports to the PlayStation 3 have ended on April 2, 2013, along with regular DLC. Rock Band Network content is not forward-compatible with Rock Band 4. Harmonix stated that they would explore the logistics of bringing RBN songs over to Rock Band 4 once core DLC and previous game exports are all addressed; however, all RBN content was delisted on the Xbox 360 and PlayStation 3 platforms in February 2018. Harmonix initially reported in March 2018 that Xbox 360 users would not be able to recover their RBN content via the Xbox 360's download history due to technical issues, with Harmonix recommending that users back up their RBN song libraries to an external storage device; however, Harmonix subsequently reported in June 2018 that Xbox 360 users are now able to re-download their RBN content as needed. In May 2018, Harmonix announced that they have secured licensing for a portion of the Rock Band Network library to be released as regular DLC; however, entitlements for re-released RBN content would not be supported due to technical and licensing restrictions.

Following the acquisition of Harmonix by Epic Games in 2021, Harmonix began winding down DLC for Rock Band as they developed Fortnite Festival for Epic. Regular DLC releases for Rock Band 4 ended on January 25, 2024, with over 3000 songs available for the game across soundtracks and DLC. On October 1st, 2025, it was announced that Rock Band 4 was set to be removed from digital sale on all platforms on October 5th of that year due to the expiration of soundtrack licenses. All downloadable content released on launch day was also announced to be delisting simultaneously, with any downloadable content released after to be delisted 10 years after initially being put on sale. Harmonix has stated that the team "will be figuring those out over the coming months" what to do with downloadable content released before Rock Band 4.

== Pricing ==
Individual songs are usually priced at either US$1.99/€1.49/£0.99, or US$1.00/€0.75/£0.59, with a few exceptions priced at £1.19 or £1.49/€1.99; all are available for download through PlayStation Network, Xbox Live and the Wii's online service unless otherwise noted on the list below. In the US, some downloadable songs have been available for the discounted US$0.99 price for a limited time before being raised to the standard price. From September 18, 2012, until October 6, 2015, all songs released prior to Rock Band 3's launch were reduced to US$1.00/€0.75/£0.59; however, with the integration of Rock Band 4's new features, Freestyle Guitar Solos and Dynamic Drum Fills, into legacy tracks, the price of all legacy DLC reverted to its original price point of US$1.99/€1.49/£0.99. The price for downloadable albums and song packs varies, according to how many songs are on the album or pack. Song packs containing three songs usually cost US$5.49, while song packs containing six songs cost US$9.99.

Since the introduction of Pro Instruments, extra pricing was necessary. In order to receive the Pro Guitar and Bass play, one must pay an additional US$1.00/€0.75/£0.59; however, certain songs or packs included the Pro Guitar for no additional charge.

In Rock Band 4, users can import previously purchased content within the same console family (i.e. Xbox One from Xbox 360 and PlayStation 4 from PlayStation 3) at no additional charge.

== Complete list of available songs ==
The following songs have been released for the Rock Band games. All songs available in packs are also available as individual song downloads on the same date, unless otherwise noted. From May 4, 2010, to December 29, 2020, new songs were usually released on Tuesdays across all participating consoles - this cadence shifted to Thursdays starting January 7, 2021. Dates listed are the initial release of songs on Xbox Live. Starting May 20, 2008, all downloadable songs are available in both the North American and European markets, unless noted.

Some songs released before Rock Band 3 have been retrofitted to include Rock Band 3 features, including backing vocals, and the ability to buy an additional pack for Pro Guitar/Bass charts without having to buy the "RB3 Version" of the song. Certain songs have been marked "family friendly" by Harmonix; such songs released before Rock Band 3's launch on October 26, 2010, can be played in Lego Rock Band.

Starting October 26, 2010 (with The Doors), new songs are no longer playable in Rock Band, Rock Band 2, or Lego Rock Band due to a change in the file format. All songs released via downloadable content prior to October 6, 2015, are playable in Rock Band 3, and support its new Pro Drum mode. Most songs released for Rock Band 3 include core features for keyboards, Pro Keyboards, and backing vocals in the core song, where they are appropriate. Additionally, some of these songs features charts for Pro Guitar and Bass that can also be purchased. Songs released on and after October 6, 2015, are playable only in Rock Band 4. In addition, all applicable songs released via downloadable content feature backing vocals when played in Rock Band 4, but no longer include keyboard or Pro Keyboard support, due to those features being removed in Rock Band 4.

Periodically, Harmonix delists songs from the Rock Band Music Store due to license expiration. As with most music licensing agreements, Rock Band's licenses for DLC have fixed terms on how long content can be sold on the platform. Harmonix announced that they will attempt to renew their license agreements, promising to give players advance notice if certain songs cannot be relicensed and must be delisted. Songs removed from the Rock Band Music Store are no longer available for new purchases; however, users who purchased songs prior to their removal from the storefront are not affected in their ability to use the content, including re-downloading songs if necessary.

=== Playable in all games in the Rock Band series ===
Song title	Artist	Year	Genre	Single / Pack name	Release date	Family Friendly	Additional Rock Band 3 Features
"Fortunate Son" (Cover Version) (Note: Track uses a cover version of the song, rather than a master recording.)	Creedence Clearwater Revival	1969	Southern Rock	Single	Nov 20, 2007	Yes	None
"Juke Box Hero" (Cover Version) (Note: Song is no longer available for purchase.)	Foreigner	1981	Classic Rock	Single	Nov 20, 2007	Yes	None
"Bang a Gong" (Cover Version)	T. Rex	1971	Glam	Single	Nov 20, 2007	No	None
"My Sharona" (Cover Version)	The Knack	1979	Pop-Rock	Single	Nov 20, 2007	No	Pro Guitar/Bass
"Cherry Bomb" (Cover Version)	The Runaways	1976	Punk	Single	Nov 20, 2007	No	None
"Joker & the Thief"	Wolfmother	2005	Rock	Single	Nov 20, 2007	Yes	None
"Ride the Lightning"	Metallica	1984	Metal	Metallica 01	Nov 20, 2007	No	None
"Blackened"	Metallica	1988	Metal	Metallica 01	Nov 20, 2007	No	None
"...And Justice for All"	Metallica	1988	Metal	Metallica 01	Nov 20, 2007	No	Pro Guitar/Bass
"3's & 7's"	Queens of the Stone Age	2007	Alternative	Queens of the Stone Age 01	Nov 20, 2007	No	None
"Little Sister"	Queens of the Stone Age	2005	Alternative	Queens of the Stone Age 01	Nov 20, 2007	No	None
"Sick, Sick, Sick"	Queens of the Stone Age	2007	Alternative	Queens of the Stone Age 01	Nov 20, 2007	No	None
"Can't Stand Losing You"	The Police	1978	Rock	The Police 01	Nov 20, 2007	No	None
"Synchronicity II"	The Police	1983	Rock	The Police 01	Nov 20, 2007	No	None
"Roxanne"	The Police	1978	Rock	The Police 01	Nov 20, 2007	No	None
"Heroes" (Cover Version)	David Bowie	1977	Glam	David Bowie 01	Nov 27, 2007	Yes	None
"Moonage Daydream"	David Bowie	1972	Glam	David Bowie 01	Nov 27, 2007	No	None
"Queen Bitch" (Cover Version)	David Bowie	1971	Glam	David Bowie 01	Nov 27, 2007	No	None
"N.I.B." (Cover Version)	Black Sabbath	1970	Metal	Black Sabbath 01	Dec 4, 2007	No	None
"Sweet Leaf" (Cover Version)	Black Sabbath	1971	Metal	Black Sabbath 01	Dec 4, 2007	No	None
"War Pigs" (Cover Version)	Black Sabbath	1970	Metal	Black Sabbath 01	Dec 4, 2007	No	None
"Ever Fallen in Love" (Cover Version)	Buzzcocks	1978	Punk	Punk 01	Dec 11, 2007	Yes	None
"I Fought the Law"	The Clash	1977	Punk	Punk 01	Dec 11, 2007	Yes	None
"Rockaway Beach"	Ramones	1977	Punk	Punk 01	Dec 11, 2007	Yes	None
"My Iron Lung"	Radiohead	1994	Alternative	Single	Dec 18, 2007	No	None
"Brass in Pocket" (Cover Version)	The Pretenders	1980	New Wave	Single	Dec 18, 2007	Yes	None
"Buddy Holly"	Weezer	1994	Alternative	Single	Dec 18, 2007	Yes	None
"Attack"	30 Seconds to Mars	2005	Emo	Single	Dec 25, 2007	No	None
"The Kill"	30 Seconds to Mars	2005	Emo	Single	Dec 25, 2007	Yes	None
"Dirty Little Secret"	All-American Rejects	2005	Emo	Single	Dec 25, 2007	Yes	None
"Move Along"	All-American Rejects	2005	Emo	Single	Dec 25, 2007	Yes	None
"Song with a Mission" (Cover Version)	The Sounds	2006	New Wave	Single	Dec 25, 2007	Yes	None
"Gimme Three Steps"	Lynyrd Skynyrd	1973	Southern Rock	Single	Jan 1, 2008	Yes	None
"Hard to Handle" (Cover Version)	The Black Crowes	1990	Southern Rock	Single	Jan 1, 2008	Yes	None
"Limelight" (Cover Version) (Note: Song is not available for the Wii platform.)	Rush	1981	Prog	Single	Jan 1, 2008	Yes	None
"Die, All Right!"	The Hives	2000	Punk	Single	Jan 8, 2008	No	None
"Interstate Love Song"	Stone Temple Pilots	1994	Alternative	Single	Jan 8, 2008	Yes	None
"The Number of the Beast" (Cover Version)	Iron Maiden	1982	Metal	Single	Jan 8, 2008	No	None
"Action" (Cover Version)	Sweet	1976	Glam	Single	Jan 15, 2008	No	None
"Last Train to Clarksville" (Cover Version)"	The Monkees	1966	Pop-Rock	Single	Jan 15, 2008	Yes	None
"All the Small Things"	Blink-182	1999	Punk	Single	Jan 15, 2008	Yes	None
"Don't Look Back in Anger"	Oasis	1995	Rock	Oasis 01	Jan 22, 2008	Yes	None
"Live Forever"	Oasis	1994	Rock	Oasis 01	Jan 22, 2008	Yes	None
"Wonderwall"	Oasis	1995	Rock	Oasis 01	Jan 22, 2008	Yes	None
"Siva"	Smashing Pumpkins	1991	Alternative	Single	Jan 29, 2008	Yes	None
"Working Man" (Cover Version)	Rush	1974	Prog	Single	Jan 29, 2008	No	None
"Ten Speed (Of God's Blood and Burial)" (Cover Version)	Coheed and Cambria	2005	Prog	Single	Jan 29, 2008	No	None
"Roam"	The B-52's	1989	New Wave	Single	Feb 5, 2008	Yes	None
"We Care a Lot"	Faith No More	1987	Rock	Single	Feb 5, 2008	No	None
"Calling Dr. Love"	Kiss	1976	Classic Rock	Single	Feb 5, 2008	No	None
"Complete Control"	The Clash	1977	Punk	(Arguably) Punk 02	Feb 11, 2008	No	None
"Truth Hits Everybody"	The Police	1978	Rock	(Arguably) Punk 02	Feb 11, 2008	No	None
"Teenage Lobotomy"	Ramones	1977	Punk	(Arguably) Punk 02	Feb 11, 2008	Yes	None
"Sex Type Thing"	Stone Temple Pilots	1992	Alternative	Single	Feb 19, 2008	No	None
"El Scorcho"	Weezer	1996	Alternative	Single	Feb 19, 2008	No	None
"Why Do You Love Me"	Garbage	2005	Alternative	Single	Feb 19, 2008	No	None
"March of the Pigs"	Nine Inch Nails	1994	Rock	Nine Inch Nails 01	Feb 26, 2008	No	None
"The Collector"	Nine Inch Nails	2005	Rock	Nine Inch Nails 01	Feb 26, 2008	No	None
"The Perfect Drug"	Nine Inch Nails	1997	Rock	Nine Inch Nails 01	Feb 26, 2008	No	None
"China Cat Sunflower"	Grateful Dead	1969	Classic Rock	Grateful Dead 01	Mar 4, 2008	Yes	None
"Casey Jones"	Grateful Dead	1970	Classic Rock	Grateful Dead 01	Mar 4, 2008	No	None
"Sugar Magnolia"	Grateful Dead	1970	Classic Rock	Grateful Dead 01	Mar 4, 2008	Yes	None
"Truckin'"	Grateful Dead	1970	Classic Rock	Grateful Dead 01	Mar 4, 2008	No	None
"Franklin's Tower"	Grateful Dead	1975	Classic Rock	Grateful Dead 01	Mar 4, 2008	No	None
"I Need a Miracle"	Grateful Dead	1978	Classic Rock	Grateful Dead 01	Mar 4, 2008	Yes	None
"Crushcrushcrush"	Paramore	2007	Pop-Rock	Single	Mar 11, 2008	Yes	None
"Beethoven's C***"	Serj Tankian	2007	Nu-Metal	Single	Mar 11, 2008	No	None
"Shockwave"	Black Tide	2008	Metal	Single	Mar 11, 2008	No	None
"Blinded by Fear"	At the Gates	1995	Metal	Earache Thrash 01	Mar 18, 2008	No	None
"D.O.A."	The Haunted	2003	Metal	Earache Thrash 01	Mar 18, 2008	No	None
"Thrasher"	Evile	2007	Metal	Earache Thrash 01	Mar 18, 2008	No	None
"Peace of Mind"	Boston	1976	Classic Rock	Boston 01	Mar 25, 2008	Yes	None
"More Than a Feeling"	Boston	1976	Classic Rock	Boston 01	Mar 25, 2008	Yes	Pro Guitar/Bass
"Smokin'"	Boston	1976	Classic Rock	Boston 01	Mar 25, 2008	No	None
"Rock and Roll Band"	Boston	1976	Classic Rock	Boston 01	Mar 25, 2008	Yes	None
"Something About You"	Boston	1976	Classic Rock	Boston 01	Mar 25, 2008	Yes	None
"Hitch a Ride"	Boston	1976	Classic Rock	Boston 01	Mar 25, 2008	Yes	None
"Still Alive" (Note: Song is available at no cost.)	GLaDOS	2007	Novelty	Single	Apr 1, 2008	Yes	None
"Rock Rebellion" (Note: Song costs US$0.99 (80 MSP/100 Wii Points).)	Bang Camaro	2007	Rock	Harmonix 01	Apr 8, 2008	Yes	None
"Shake"	Count Zero	2008	Rock	Harmonix 01	Apr 8, 2008	No	None
"Sprode"	Freezepop	2003	Pop/Dance/Electronic	Harmonix 01	Apr 8, 2008	Yes	None
"Simple Man"	Lynyrd Skynyrd	1973	Southern Rock	Classic Rock 01	Apr 15, 2008	Yes	Pro Guitar/Bass
"Message in a Bottle"	The Police	1979	Rock	Classic Rock 01	Apr 15, 2008	Yes	None
"Call Me"	Blondie	1981	New Wave	Classic Rock 01	Apr 15, 2008	Yes	None
"Saints of Los Angeles"	Mötley Crüe	2008	Glam	Single	Apr 15, 2008	No	None
"The Hellion/Electric Eye"	Judas Priest	1982	Metal	Screaming for Vengeance	Apr 22, 2008	No	None
"Riding on the Wind"	Judas Priest	1982	Metal	Screaming for Vengeance	Apr 22, 2008	No	None
"Bloodstone"	Judas Priest	1982	Metal	Screaming for Vengeance	Apr 22, 2008	Yes	None
"(Take These) Chains"	Judas Priest	1982	Metal	Screaming for Vengeance	Apr 22, 2008	Yes	None
"Pain and Pleasure"	Judas Priest	1982	Metal	Screaming for Vengeance	Apr 22, 2008	No	None
"Screaming for Vengeance"	Judas Priest	1982	Metal	Screaming for Vengeance	Apr 22, 2008	No	None
"You've Got Another Thing Comin'"	Judas Priest	1982	Metal	Screaming for Vengeance	Apr 22, 2008	No	None
"Fever"	Judas Priest	1982	Metal	Screaming for Vengeance	Apr 22, 2008	No	None
"Devil's Child"	Judas Priest	1982	Metal	Screaming for Vengeance	Apr 22, 2008	No	None
"Red Tandy"	The Mother Hips	2005	Rock	Single	Apr 29, 2008	Yes	None
"Time-Sick Son of a Grizzly Bear"	The Mother Hips	2007	Rock	Single	Apr 29, 2008	Yes	None
"Zero"	Smashing Pumpkins	1995	Alternative	Single	Apr 29, 2008	No	None
"This Ain't a Scene, It's an Arms Race"	Fall Out Boy	2007	Pop-Rock	Scene 01	May 6, 2008	No	None
"Date with the Night"	Yeah Yeah Yeahs	2003	Indie Rock	Scene 01	May 6, 2008	No	None
"It Hurts"	Angels & Airwaves	2006	Alternative	Scene 01	May 6, 2008	No	None
"Hanging on the Telephone"	Blondie	1978	New Wave	Single	May 13, 2008	Yes	None
"Train in Vain (Stand by Me)"	The Clash	1979	Punk	Single	May 13, 2008	Yes	None
"Kool Thing"	Sonic Youth	1990	Alternative	Single	May 13, 2008	No	None
"Beetlebum" (Cover Version)	Blur	1997	Alternative	Single	May 20, 2008	No	None
"Countdown to Insanity"	H-Blockx	2007	Rock	Single	May 20, 2008	No	None
"Hier Kommt Alex"	Die Toten Hosen	1988	Punk	Single	May 20, 2008	No	None
"Hysteria"	Muse	2003	Alternative	Single	May 20, 2008	Yes	None
"Manu Chao"	Les Wampas	2003	Punk	Single	May 20, 2008	No	None
"Monsoon"	Tokio Hotel	2005	Pop-Rock	Single	May 20, 2008	Yes	None
"New Wave"	Pleymo	2002	Metal	Single	May 20, 2008	No	None
"Perfekte Welle"	Juli	2004	Rock	Single	May 20, 2008	No	None
"Rock 'n' Roll Star"	Oasis	1994	Rock	Single	May 20, 2008	Yes	None
"Good Times Roll"	The Cars	1978	New Wave	The Cars	May 27, 2008	Yes	None
"My Best Friend's Girl"	The Cars	1978	New Wave	The Cars	May 27, 2008	Yes	None
"Just What I Needed"	The Cars	1978	New Wave	The Cars	May 27, 2008	Yes	None
"I'm in Touch with Your World"	The Cars	1978	New Wave	The Cars	May 27, 2008	Yes	None
"Don't Cha Stop"	The Cars	1978	New Wave	The Cars	May 27, 2008	No	None
"You're All I've Got Tonight"	The Cars	1978	New Wave	The Cars	May 27, 2008	Yes	None
"Bye Bye Love"	The Cars	1978	New Wave	The Cars	May 27, 2008	Yes	None
"Moving in Stereo"	The Cars	1978	New Wave	The Cars	May 27, 2008	Yes	None
"All Mixed Up"	The Cars	1978	New Wave	The Cars	May 27, 2008	Yes	None
"Indestructible"	Disturbed	2008	Nu-Metal	Disturbed 01	Jun 3, 2008	No	None
"Inside the Fire"	Disturbed	2008	Nu-Metal	Disturbed 01	Jun 3, 2008	No	None
"Perfect Insanity"	Disturbed	2008	Nu-Metal	Disturbed 01	Jun 3, 2008	No	None
"Cheeseburger in Paradise" (Rock Band Re-Record)	Jimmy Buffett	1978	Rock	Jimmy Buffett 01	Jun 3, 2008	No	None
"Margaritaville" (Rock Band Re-Record)	Jimmy Buffett	1977	Rock	Jimmy Buffett 01	Jun 3, 2008	No	None
"Volcano" (Rock Band Re-Record)	Jimmy Buffett	1979	Rock	Jimmy Buffett 01	Jun 3, 2008	No	None
"Moving to Seattle"	The Material	2007	Alternative	MTV2 01	Jun 10, 2008	Yes	None
"A Clean Shot"	The Myriad	2008	Alternative	MTV2 01	Jun 10, 2008	No	None
"Bullets & Guns"	Them Terribles	2007	Alternative	MTV2 01	Jun 10, 2008	No	None
"Girls Who Play Guitars"	Maxïmo Park	2007	Pop-Rock	Single	Jun 10, 2008	No	None
"Critical Acclaim"	Avenged Sevenfold	2007	Metal	Single	Jun 17, 2008	No	None
"Afterlife"	Avenged Sevenfold	2007	Metal	Single	Jun 17, 2008	No	None
"Hammerhead"	The Offspring	2008	Punk	Single	Jun 17, 2008	No	None
"Rock n' Roll Dream"	Crooked X	2008	Rock	Single	Jun 17, 2008	Yes	None
"Debaser"	Pixies	1989	Alternative	Doolittle	Jun 24, 2008	No	None
"Tame"	Pixies	1989	Alternative	Doolittle	Jun 24, 2008	Yes	None
"I Bleed"	Pixies	1989	Alternative	Doolittle	Jun 24, 2008	No	None
"Here Comes Your Man"	Pixies	1989	Alternative	Doolittle	Jun 24, 2008	Yes	None
"Dead"	Pixies	1989	Alternative	Doolittle	Jun 24, 2008	No	None
"Monkey Gone to Heaven"	Pixies	1989	Alternative	Doolittle	Jun 24, 2008	No	None
"Mr. Grieves"	Pixies	1989	Alternative	Doolittle	Jun 24, 2008	Yes	None
"Crackity Jones"	Pixies	1989	Alternative	Doolittle	Jun 24, 2008	Yes	None
"La La Love You"	Pixies	1989	Alternative	Doolittle	Jun 24, 2008	Yes	None
"No. 13 Baby"	Pixies	1989	Alternative	Doolittle	Jun 24, 2008	No	None
"There Goes My Gun"	Pixies	1989	Alternative	Doolittle	Jun 24, 2008	Yes	None
"Hey"	Pixies	1989	Alternative	Doolittle	Jun 24, 2008	No	None
"Silver"	Pixies	1989	Alternative	Doolittle	Jun 24, 2008	Yes	None
"Gouge Away"	Pixies	1989	Alternative	Doolittle	Jun 24, 2008	No	None
"Dreamin'"	Weezer	2008	Alternative	Weezer 01	Jun 24, 2008	Yes	None
"The Greatest Man That Ever Lived"	Weezer	2008	Alternative	Weezer 01	Jun 24, 2008	No	None
"Troublemaker"	Weezer	2008	Alternative	Weezer 01	Jun 24, 2008	No	None
"Down at the Whisky"	Mötley Crüe	2008	Glam	Crüe Fest 01	Jul 1, 2008	No	None
"Time Is Running Out"	Papa Roach	2006	Nu-Metal	Crüe Fest 01	Jul 1, 2008	Yes	None
"Who's Going Home with You Tonight?"	Trapt	2008	Nu-Metal	Crüe Fest 01	Jul 1, 2008	Yes	None
"Promised Land"	Vesuvius	2008	Rock	Single	Jul 1, 2008	No	None
"Snow ((Hey Oh))"	Red Hot Chili Peppers	2006	Alternative	Single	Jul 8, 2008	No	None
"Tell Me Baby"	Red Hot Chili Peppers	2006	Alternative	Single	Jul 8, 2008	No	None
"Closer to the Heart"	Rush	1977	Prog	Single	Jul 8, 2008	Yes	None
"Working Man" (Vault Edition)	Rush	1974	Prog	Single	Jul 8, 2008	No	None
"Amazing Journey"	The Who	1969	Classic Rock	The Best of The Who (Rock Band Edition)	Jul 15, 2008	Yes	None
"Baba O'Riley"	The Who	1971	Classic Rock	The Best of The Who (Rock Band Edition)	Jul 15, 2008	Yes	None
"Behind Blue Eyes"	The Who	1971	Classic Rock	The Best of The Who (Rock Band Edition)	Jul 15, 2008	Yes	None
"Eminence Front"	The Who	1982	Classic Rock	The Best of The Who (Rock Band Edition)	Jul 15, 2008	Yes	None
"Going Mobile"	The Who	1971	Classic Rock	The Best of The Who (Rock Band Edition)	Jul 15, 2008	Yes	None
"Leaving Here"	The Who	1965	Classic Rock	The Best of The Who (Rock Band Edition)	Jul 15, 2008	Yes	None
"My Generation" (Live at Leeds)	The Who	1970	Classic Rock	The Best of The Who (Rock Band Edition)	Jul 15, 2008	Yes	None
"Real Good Looking Boy"	The Who	2004	Classic Rock	The Best of The Who (Rock Band Edition)	Jul 15, 2008	No	None
"Sea and Sand"	The Who	1973	Classic Rock	The Best of The Who (Rock Band Edition)	Jul 15, 2008	No	None
"Summertime Blues" (Live at Leeds)	The Who	1970	Classic Rock	The Best of The Who (Rock Band Edition)	Jul 15, 2008	Yes	None
"Who Are You"	The Who	1978	Classic Rock	The Best of The Who (Rock Band Edition)	Jul 15, 2008	No	None
"Young Man Blues" (Live at Leeds)	The Who	1970	Classic Rock	The Best of The Who (Rock Band Edition)	Jul 15, 2008	No	None
"Burn"	Nine Inch Nails	1994	Rock	Nine Inch Nails 02	Jul 22, 2008	No	None
"Capital G"	Nine Inch Nails	2007	Rock	Nine Inch Nails 02	Jul 22, 2008	No	None
"Last"	Nine Inch Nails	1992	Rock	Nine Inch Nails 02	Jul 22, 2008	No	None
"Devour"	Shinedown	2008	Nu-Metal	Single	Jul 22, 2008	Yes	None
"Junkies for Fame"	Shinedown	2008	Nu-Metal	Single	Jul 22, 2008	No	None
"They Say"	Scars on Broadway	2008	Rock	Single	Jul 29, 2008	No	None
"This Is It"	Staind	2008	Nu-Metal	Single	Jul 29, 2008	Yes	None
"Electric Crown"	Testament	1992	Metal	Single	Jul 29, 2008	Yes	None
"Yomp"	Thenewno2	2008	Pop-Rock	Single	Jul 29, 2008	Yes	None
"Toxicity"	System of a Down	2001	Nu-Metal	Single	Aug 5, 2008	Yes	None
"B.Y.O.B."	System of a Down	2005	Nu-Metal	Single	Aug 5, 2008	No	None
"Face Down in the Dirt"	Mötley Crüe	2008	Glam	Crüe Fest 02	Aug 5, 2008	No	None
"Rescue Me"	Buckcherry	2008	Rock	Crüe Fest 02	Aug 5, 2008	Yes	None
"Life Is Beautiful"	Sixx:A.M.	2007	Rock	Crüe Fest 02	Aug 5, 2008	No	None
"Aesthetics of Hate"	Machine Head	2007	Metal	Roadrunner Records 01	Aug 12, 2008	No	None
"Clouds Over California"	DevilDriver	2007	Metal	Roadrunner Records 01	Aug 12, 2008	No	None
"Constant Motion"	Dream Theater	2007	Metal	Roadrunner Records 01	Aug 12, 2008	Yes	None
"My Curse"	Killswitch Engage	2006	Metal	Roadrunner Records 01	Aug 12, 2008	Yes	None
"Sleepwalker"	Megadeth	2007	Metal	Roadrunner Records 01	Aug 12, 2008	No	None
"Runnin' Wild"	Airbourne	2007	Rock	Single	Aug 12, 2008	No	None
"Girl U Want (Rock Band Re-Record)"	Devo	1980	New Wave	Single	Aug 19, 2008	Yes	None
"Through Being Cool (Rock Band Re-Record)"	Devo	1981	New Wave	Single	Aug 19, 2008	Yes	None
"Rio"	Duran Duran	1982	New Wave	Single	Aug 19, 2008	Yes	None
"Girls on Film"	Duran Duran	1981	New Wave	Single	Aug 19, 2008	Yes	None
"Get Your Rock On"	The Janitors	2008	Pop-Rock	Single	Aug 19, 2008	Yes	None
"All Over Again"	Locksley	2007	Pop-Rock	Locksley 01	Aug 28, 2008	Yes	None
"She Does"	Locksley	2007	Pop-Rock	Locksley 01	Aug 28, 2008	Yes	None
"Don't Make Me Wait"	Locksley	2007	Pop-Rock	Locksley 01	Aug 28, 2008	Yes	None
"Skullcrusher Mountain"	Jonathan Coulton	2004	Pop-Rock	The PAX 2008 Collection	Sep 2, 2008	Yes	None
"Livin' at the Corner of Dude & Catastrophe"	MC Frontalot feat. Brad Sucks	2007	Hip-Hop/Rap	The PAX 2008 Collection	Sep 2, 2008	No	None
"Shhh...."	The Darkest of the Hillside Thickets	2008	Rock	The PAX 2008 Collection	Sep 2, 2008	No	None
"This Calling"	All That Remains	2006	Metal	All That Remains 01	Sep 9, 2008	Yes	None
"Chiron"	All That Remains	2008	Metal	All That Remains 01	Sep 9, 2008	Yes	None
"Two Weeks"	All That Remains	2008	Metal	All That Remains 01	Sep 9, 2008	Yes	None
"Charlene (I'm Right Behind You)"	Stephen and the Colberts	1986	Pop-Rock	Single	Sep 11, 2008	Yes	None
"One of THOSE Nights"	The Cab	2008	Pop-Rock	Rock Band Live 2008 Tour 01	Sep 16, 2008	Yes	None
"Hands Down"	Dashboard Confessional	2003	Emo	Rock Band Live 2008 Tour 01	Sep 16, 2008	No	None
"She's a Handsome Woman"	Panic! at the Disco	2008	Emo	Rock Band Live 2008 Tour 01	Sep 16, 2008	Yes	None
"Natural Disaster"	Plain White T's	2008	Pop-Rock	Rock Band Live 2008 Tour 01	Sep 16, 2008	No	None
"Wake Up Dead"	Megadeth	1986	Metal	Peace Sells... but Who's Buying?	Sep 16, 2008	No	None
"The Conjuring"	Megadeth	1986	Metal	Peace Sells... but Who's Buying?	Sep 16, 2008	No	None
"Devil's Island"	Megadeth	1986	Metal	Peace Sells... but Who's Buying?	Sep 16, 2008	No	None
"Good Mourning/Black Friday"	Megadeth	1986	Metal	Peace Sells... but Who's Buying?	Sep 16, 2008	No	None
"Bad Omen"	Megadeth	1986	Metal	Peace Sells... but Who's Buying?	Sep 16, 2008	No	None
"I Ain't Superstitious"	Megadeth	1986	Metal	Peace Sells... but Who's Buying?	Sep 16, 2008	No	None
"My Last Words"	Megadeth	1986	Metal	Peace Sells... but Who's Buying?	Sep 16, 2008	No	None
"Tom Sawyer" (Original Version)	Rush	1981	Prog	Moving Pictures	Sep 23, 2008	Yes	None
"Red Barchetta"	Rush	1981	Prog	Moving Pictures	Sep 23, 2008	Yes	None
"YYZ"	Rush	1981	Prog	Moving Pictures	Sep 23, 2008	Yes	None
"Limelight" (Original Version)	Rush	1981	Prog	Moving Pictures	Sep 23, 2008	Yes	None
"The Camera Eye"	Rush	1981	Prog	Moving Pictures	Sep 23, 2008	Yes	None
"Witch Hunt (Part III of Fear)"	Rush	1981	Prog	Moving Pictures	Sep 23, 2008	Yes	None
"Vital Signs"	Rush	1981	Prog	Moving Pictures	Sep 23, 2008	Yes	None
"Sorrow"	Bad Religion	2002	Punk	Single	Sep 23, 2008	No	None
"She Sells Sanctuary"	The Cult	1985	Rock	Single	Sep 23, 2008	Yes	None
"Bandages"	Hot Hot Heat	2002	Alternative	Single	Sep 23, 2008	No	None
"Shoot the Runner"	Kasabian	2006	Indie Rock	Single	Sep 23, 2008	No	None
"You're No Rock N Roll Fun"	Sleater-Kinney	2000	Indie Rock	Single	Sep 23, 2008	No	None
"Love Spreads"	The Stone Roses	1994	Alternative	Single	Sep 23, 2008	No	None
"The Power of Equality"	Red Hot Chili Peppers	1991	Alternative	Blood Sugar Sex Magik	Sep 30, 2008	No	None
"If You Have to Ask"	Red Hot Chili Peppers	1991	Alternative	Blood Sugar Sex Magik	Sep 30, 2008	No	None
"Breaking the Girl"	Red Hot Chili Peppers	1991	Alternative	Blood Sugar Sex Magik	Sep 30, 2008	No	None
"Funky Monks"	Red Hot Chili Peppers	1991	Alternative	Blood Sugar Sex Magik	Sep 30, 2008	No	None
"Suck My Kiss"	Red Hot Chili Peppers	1991	Alternative	Blood Sugar Sex Magik	Sep 30, 2008	No	None
"I Could Have Lied"	Red Hot Chili Peppers	1991	Alternative	Blood Sugar Sex Magik	Sep 30, 2008	No	None
"Mellowship Slinky in B Major"	Red Hot Chili Peppers	1991	Alternative	Blood Sugar Sex Magik	Sep 30, 2008	No	None
"The Righteous and the Wicked"	Red Hot Chili Peppers	1991	Alternative	Blood Sugar Sex Magik	Sep 30, 2008	No	None
"Blood Sugar Sex Magik"	Red Hot Chili Peppers	1991	Alternative	Blood Sugar Sex Magik	Sep 30, 2008	No	None
"Under the Bridge"	Red Hot Chili Peppers	1991	Alternative	Blood Sugar Sex Magik	Sep 30, 2008	No	Pro Guitar/Bass
"Naked in the Rain"	Red Hot Chili Peppers	1991	Alternative	Blood Sugar Sex Magik	Sep 30, 2008	No	None
"Apache Rose Peacock"	Red Hot Chili Peppers	1991	Alternative	Blood Sugar Sex Magik	Sep 30, 2008	No	None
"The Greeting Song"	Red Hot Chili Peppers	1991	Alternative	Blood Sugar Sex Magik	Sep 30, 2008	No	None
"My Lovely Man"	Red Hot Chili Peppers	1991	Alternative	Blood Sugar Sex Magik	Sep 30, 2008	No	None
"Sir Psycho Sexy"	Red Hot Chili Peppers	1991	Alternative	Blood Sugar Sex Magik	Sep 30, 2008	No	None
"They're Red Hot"	Red Hot Chili Peppers	1991	Alternative	Blood Sugar Sex Magik	Sep 30, 2008	No	None
"All Right Now"	Free	1970	Classic Rock	Single	Oct 7, 2008	No	None
"Stop!"	Against Me!	2007	Punk	Single	Oct 7, 2008	No	None
"Bad to the Bone"	George Thorogood & the Destroyers	1982	Rock	Single	Oct 7, 2008	Yes	None
"Cream and Bastards Rise"	Harvey Danger	2005	Alternative	Single	Oct 7, 2008	No	None
"Nearly Lost You"	Screaming Trees	1992	Grunge	Single	Oct 7, 2008	Yes	None
"Push It"	Static-X	1999	Nu-Metal	Single	Oct 7, 2008	No	None
"Gone Away"	The Offspring	1997	Punk	The Offspring 01	Oct 7, 2008	No	None
"Pretty Fly (For a White Guy)"	The Offspring	1998	Punk	The Offspring 01	Oct 7, 2008	No	None
"Self Esteem"	The Offspring	1994	Punk	The Offspring 01	Oct 7, 2008	No	Pro Guitar/Bass
"Dr. Feelgood"	Mötley Crüe	1989	Glam	Dr. Feelgood	Oct 14, 2008	No	None
"Slice of Your Pie"	Mötley Crüe	1989	Glam	Dr. Feelgood	Oct 14, 2008	No	None
"Rattlesnake Shake"	Mötley Crüe	1989	Glam	Dr. Feelgood	Oct 14, 2008	No	None
"Kickstart My Heart"	Mötley Crüe	1989	Glam	Dr. Feelgood	Oct 14, 2008	No	Pro Guitar/Bass
"Without You"	Mötley Crüe	1989	Glam	Dr. Feelgood	Oct 14, 2008	Yes	None
"Same Ol' Situation (S.O.S.)"	Mötley Crüe	1989	Glam	Dr. Feelgood	Oct 14, 2008	No	None
"Sticky Sweet"	Mötley Crüe	1989	Glam	Dr. Feelgood	Oct 14, 2008	No	None
"She Goes Down"	Mötley Crüe	1989	Glam	Dr. Feelgood	Oct 14, 2008	No	None
"Don't Go Away Mad (Just Go Away)"	Mötley Crüe	1989	Glam	Dr. Feelgood	Oct 14, 2008	Yes	None
"Time for Change"	Mötley Crüe	1989	Glam	Dr. Feelgood	Oct 14, 2008	Yes	None
"Breed"	Nirvana	1991	Grunge	Nirvana 01	Oct 21, 2008	No	Pro Guitar/Bass
"Lounge Act"	Nirvana	1991	Grunge	Nirvana 01	Oct 21, 2008	No	Pro Guitar/Bass
"On a Plain"	Nirvana	1991	Grunge	Nirvana 01	Oct 21, 2008	No	Pro Guitar/Bass
"Polly"	Nirvana	1991	Grunge	Nirvana 01	Oct 21, 2008	No	Pro Guitar/Bass
"Something in the Way"	Nirvana	1991	Grunge	Nirvana 01	Oct 21, 2008	Yes	Pro Guitar/Bass
"Stay Away"	Nirvana	1991	Grunge	Nirvana 01	Oct 21, 2008	No	Pro Guitar/Bass
"Territorial Pissings"	Nirvana	1991	Grunge	Nirvana 01	Oct 21, 2008	No	Pro Guitar/Bass
"Hong Kong Garden"	Siouxsie and The Banshees	1981	Pop-Rock	Siouxsie and the Banshees 01	Oct 28, 2008	Yes	None
"Kiss Them for Me"	Siouxsie and The Banshees	1991	Pop-Rock	Siouxsie and the Banshees 01	Oct 28, 2008	Yes	None
"The Killing Jar"	Siouxsie and The Banshees	1988	Pop-Rock	Siouxsie and the Banshees 01	Oct 28, 2008	Yes	None
"Dammit"	Blink-182	1997	Punk	Single	Oct 28, 2008	No	Pro Guitar/Bass
"Well Thought Out Twinkles"	Silversun Pickups	2006	Indie Rock	Single	Oct 28, 2008	Yes	None
"Melatonin"	Silversun Pickups	2006	Indie Rock	Single	Oct 28, 2008	Yes	None
"Pretty in Pink"	The Psychedelic Furs	1981	New Wave	Single	Oct 28, 2008	Yes	None
"Dune Buggy"	The Presidents of the United States of America	1995	Grunge	The Presidents of the United States of America 01	Nov 4, 2008	No	None
"Feather Pluck'n"	The Presidents of the United States of America	1995	Grunge	The Presidents of the United States of America 01	Nov 4, 2008	Yes	None
"Ladybug"	The Presidents of the United States of America	2008	Grunge	The Presidents of the United States of America 01	Nov 4, 2008	Yes	None
"Use Me"	Hinder	2008	Rock	Single	Nov 4, 2008	No	None
"I Don't Care"	Fall Out Boy	2008	Pop-Rock	Single	Nov 4, 2008	No	None
"Ashes to Fire" (Note: Song is also available through a special promotion.)	Ghost Hounds	2008	Rock	Rock Band 2 20-Pack	Nov 6, 2008	Yes	None
"Bounce"	The Cab	2008	Pop-Rock	Rock Band 2 20-Pack	Nov 6, 2008	No	None
"Burn You Down"	Opiate for the Masses	2008	Rock	Rock Band 2 20-Pack	Nov 6, 2008	No	None
"Crazy Tuesday"	Thenewno2	2008	Pop-Rock	Rock Band 2 20-Pack	Nov 6, 2008	Yes	None
"Database Corrupted"	Dealership	2004	Indie Rock	Rock Band 2 20-Pack	Nov 6, 2008	Yes	None
"Desperate Times, Desperate Measures"	Underoath	2008	Emo	Rock Band 2 20-Pack	Nov 6, 2008	No	None
"Get It On"	The Chevelles	2008	Rock	Rock Band 2 20-Pack	Nov 6, 2008	No	None
"Give It to Me"	Cocktail Slippers	2006	Indie Rock	Rock Band 2 20-Pack	Nov 6, 2008	No	None
"I Wanna Be Your Man"	Endeverafter	2007	Rock	Rock Band 2 20-Pack	Nov 6, 2008	No	None
"I'm Gone, I'm Going"	Lesley Roy	2008	Pop-Rock	Rock Band 2 20-Pack	Nov 6, 2008	Yes	None
"I.V."	X Japan	2008	Metal	Rock Band 2 20-Pack	Nov 6, 2008	No	None
"If I Ain't Got You"	The Len Price 3	2007	Rock	Rock Band 2 20-Pack	Nov 6, 2008	Yes	None
"Like a Fool"	Shaimus	2008	Indie Rock	Rock Band 2 20-Pack	Nov 6, 2008	Yes	None
"Magnetic Baby"	Semi Precious Weapons	2008	Glam	Rock Band 2 20-Pack	Nov 6, 2008	No	None
"No Regrets"	Authority Zero	2007	Punk	Rock Band 2 20-Pack	Nov 6, 2008	No	None
"Prequel to the Sequel"	Between the Buried and Me	2007	Prog	Rock Band 2 20-Pack	Nov 6, 2008	No	None
"Sons and Daughters"	The 88	2008	Pop-Rock	Rock Band 2 20-Pack	Nov 6, 2008	No	None
"The Feeling"	Kutless	2008	Rock	Rock Band 2 20-Pack	Nov 6, 2008	Yes	None
"The Time Is Wrong"	Tickle Me Pink	2008	Emo	Rock Band 2 20-Pack	Nov 6, 2008	Yes	None
"Young"	Hollywood Undead	2008	Nu-Metal	Rock Band 2 20-Pack	Nov 6, 2008	No	None
"Doll"	Foo Fighters	1997	Alternative	The Colour and the Shape	Nov 11, 2008	Yes	None
"Monkey Wrench"	Foo Fighters	1997	Alternative	The Colour and the Shape	Nov 11, 2008	No	Pro Guitar/Bass
"Hey, Johnny Park!"	Foo Fighters	1997	Alternative	The Colour and the Shape	Nov 11, 2008	Yes	None
"My Poor Brain"	Foo Fighters	1997	Alternative	The Colour and the Shape	Nov 11, 2008	No	None
"Wind Up"	Foo Fighters	1997	Alternative	The Colour and the Shape	Nov 11, 2008	Yes	None
"Up in Arms"	Foo Fighters	1997	Alternative	The Colour and the Shape	Nov 11, 2008	Yes	None
"My Hero"	Foo Fighters	1997	Alternative	The Colour and the Shape	Nov 11, 2008	Yes	None
"See You"	Foo Fighters	1997	Alternative	The Colour and the Shape	Nov 11, 2008	Yes	None
"Enough Space"	Foo Fighters	1997	Alternative	The Colour and the Shape	Nov 11, 2008	Yes	None
"February Stars"	Foo Fighters	1997	Alternative	The Colour and the Shape	Nov 11, 2008	Yes	None
"Walking After You"	Foo Fighters	1997	Alternative	The Colour and the Shape	Nov 11, 2008	Yes	None
"New Way Home"	Foo Fighters	1997	Alternative	The Colour and the Shape	Nov 11, 2008	Yes	None
"California über alles"	Dead Kennedys	1987	Punk	Dead Kennedys 01	Nov 18, 2008	No	None
"Holiday in Cambodia"	Dead Kennedys	1987	Punk	Dead Kennedys 01	Nov 18, 2008	No	None
"Police Truck"	Dead Kennedys	1987	Punk	Dead Kennedys 01	Nov 18, 2008	No	None
"Mica"	Mission of Burma	1982	Punk	Mission of Burma 01	Nov 18, 2008	Yes	None
"That's How I Escaped My Certain Fate"	Mission of Burma	1982	Punk	Mission of Burma 01	Nov 18, 2008	Yes	None
"That's When I Reach for My Revolver"	Mission of Burma	1981	Punk	Mission of Burma 01	Nov 18, 2008	No	None
"Forever"	In This Moment	2008	Metal	Century Media Girls of Metal 01	Nov 18, 2008	Yes	None
"Closer"	Lacuna Coil	2006	Metal	Century Media Girls of Metal 01	Nov 18, 2008	No	None
"Swamped"	Lacuna Coil	2002	Metal	Century Media Girls of Metal 01	Nov 18, 2008	Yes	None
"Gone"	Crooked X	2008	Metal	Single	Nov 18, 2008	Yes	None
"Mr. Brightside"	The Killers	2004	Alternative	The Killers 01	Nov 25, 2008	No	None
"Spaceman"	The Killers	2008	Alternative	The Killers 01	Nov 25, 2008	Yes	None
"Smile Like You Mean It"	The Killers	2004	Alternative	The Killers 01	Nov 25, 2008	Yes	None
"Caprici Di Diablo"	Yngwie Malmsteen's Rising Force	2008	Metal	Yngwie Malmsteen 01	Nov 25, 2008	No	None
"Damnation Game"	Yngwie Malmsteen's Rising Force	2008	Metal	Yngwie Malmsteen 01	Nov 25, 2008	No	None
"Red Devil"	Yngwie Malmsteen's Rising Force	2008	Metal	Yngwie Malmsteen 01	Nov 25, 2008	No	None
"Jesus Christ Pose"	Soundgarden	1991	Grunge	Single	Nov 25, 2008	No	None
"Pretty Noose"	Soundgarden	1996	Grunge	Single	Nov 25, 2008	No	Pro Guitar/Bass
"Laid to Rest"	Lamb of God	2004	Metal	Single	Nov 25, 2008	No	None
"Are You Dead Yet?"	Children of Bodom	2005	Metal	Single	Dec 2, 2008	No	None
"Tutto è possibile"	Finley	2006	Punk	Single	Dec 2, 2008	Yes	None
"Hay Poco Rock N Roll"	Platero y Tú	1994	Rock	Single	Dec 2, 2008	No	None
"Tempted"	Squeeze	1981	New Wave	Single	Dec 2, 2008	Yes	None
"Ready, Set, Go!"	Tokio Hotel	2007	Pop-Rock	Single	Dec 2, 2008	Yes	None
"Real World"	All-American Rejects	2008	Emo	Single	Dec 2, 2008	No	None
"Headphones On"	Miranda Cosgrove	2008	Pop-Rock	Single	Dec 2, 2008	Yes	None
"Body I Occupy"	The Naked Brothers Band	2008	Pop-Rock	Single	Dec 2, 2008	Yes	None
"I Don't Want to Go to School"	The Naked Brothers Band	2008	Pop-Rock	Single	Dec 2, 2008	Yes	None
"Just a Girl"	No Doubt	1995	Pop-Rock	The Singles 1992-2003 (Note: Song is also available as part of "No Doubt Tragic Kingdom: The Complete Album".)	Dec 9, 2008	Yes	None
"It's My Life"	No Doubt	2003	Pop-Rock	The Singles 1992-2003	Dec 9, 2008	Yes	None
"Hey Baby"	No Doubt	2003	Pop-Rock	The Singles 1992-2003	Dec 9, 2008	Yes	None
"Bathwater"	No Doubt	2003	Pop-Rock	The Singles 1992-2003	Dec 9, 2008	Yes	None
"Sunday Morning"	No Doubt	1995	Pop-Rock	The Singles 1992-2003	Dec 9, 2008	Yes	None
"Hella Good"	No Doubt	2003	Pop-Rock	The Singles 1992-2003	Dec 9, 2008	No	None
"Underneath It All"	No Doubt	2003	Pop-Rock	The Singles 1992-2003	Dec 9, 2008	Yes	None
"Excuse Me Mr."	No Doubt	1995	Pop-Rock	The Singles 1992-2003	Dec 9, 2008	Yes	None
"Running"	No Doubt	2003	Pop-Rock	The Singles 1992-2003	Dec 9, 2008	Yes	None
"Spiderwebs"	No Doubt	1995	Pop-Rock	The Singles 1992-2003	Dec 9, 2008	Yes	None
"Simple Kind of Life"	No Doubt	2003	Pop-Rock	The Singles 1992-2003	Dec 9, 2008	Yes	None
"Don't Speak"	No Doubt	1995	Pop-Rock	The Singles 1992-2003	Dec 9, 2008	Yes	None
"Ex-Girlfriend"	No Doubt	2003	Pop-Rock	The Singles 1992-2003	Dec 9, 2008	Yes	None
"Mud on the Tires"	Brad Paisley	2003	Country	Going Country 01	Dec 16, 2008	Yes	None
"Hillbilly Deluxe"	Brooks & Dunn	2005	Country	Going Country 01	Dec 16, 2008	No	None
"Free and Easy (Down the Road I Go)"	Dierks Bentley	2006	Country	Going Country 01	Dec 16, 2008	Yes	None
"Sin Wagon"	Dixie Chicks	1999	Country	Going Country 01	Dec 16, 2008	No	None
"Gunpowder & Lead"	Miranda Lambert	2007	Country	Going Country 01	Dec 16, 2008	No	None
"Hanukkah Blessings"	Barenaked Ladies	2004	Rock	Rockin' the Holidays 2008	Dec 23, 2008	Yes	None
"Christmas Is the Time to Say I Love You"	Billy Squier	1994	Classic Rock	Rockin' the Holidays 2008	Dec 23, 2008	Yes	None
"Blue Christmas"	The Pretenders	2008	New Wave	Rockin' the Holidays 2008	Dec 23, 2008	Yes	None
"This Is a Call"	Foo Fighters	1995	Alternative	Foo Fighters 01	Dec 23, 2008	Yes	None
"Times Like These"	Foo Fighters	2002	Alternative	Foo Fighters 01	Dec 23, 2008	Yes	None
"DOA"	Foo Fighters	2005	Alternative	Foo Fighters 01	Dec 23, 2008	Yes	None
"Space Truckin'"	Deep Purple	1972	Prog	Single	Dec 30, 2008	Yes	None
"Funk #49"	James Gang	1970	Classic Rock	Single	Dec 30, 2008	Yes	Pro Guitar/Bass
"Hymn 43"	Jethro Tull	1971	Prog	Single	Dec 30, 2008	No	None
"Take Back the City"	Snow Patrol	2008	Alternative	Single	Dec 30, 2008	Yes	None
"Claudette"	Roy Orbison	1965	Classic Rock	Roy Orbison 01	Jan 6, 2009	Yes	None
"In Dreams"	Roy Orbison	1963	Classic Rock	Roy Orbison 01	Jan 6, 2009	Yes	None
"Mean Woman Blues"	Roy Orbison	1963	Classic Rock	Roy Orbison 01	Jan 6, 2009	Yes	None
"Oh, Pretty Woman"	Roy Orbison	1964	Classic Rock	Roy Orbison 01	Jan 6, 2009	Yes	None
"Ooby Dooby"	Roy Orbison	1956	Classic Rock	Roy Orbison 01	Jan 6, 2009	Yes	None
"You Got It"	Roy Orbison	1989	Classic Rock	Roy Orbison 01	Jan 6, 2009	Yes	None
"Are You Gonna Go My Way"	Lenny Kravitz	1993	Rock	Lenny Kravitz 01	Jan 13, 2009	Yes	None
"Freedom Train"	Lenny Kravitz	1989	Rock	Lenny Kravitz 01	Jan 13, 2009	Yes	None
"Let Love Rule"	Lenny Kravitz	1989	Rock	Lenny Kravitz 01	Jan 13, 2009	Yes	None
"Mr. Cab Driver"	Lenny Kravitz	1989	Rock	Lenny Kravitz 01	Jan 13, 2009	Yes	None
"Megasus"	Megasus	2009	Metal	Single	Jan 13, 2009	No	None
"Entangled"	Honest Bob and the Factory-to-Dealer Incentives	2008	Indie Rock	Single	Jan 13, 2009	Yes	None
"Space Cowboy"	Steve Miller Band	1969	Classic Rock	Steve Miller Band 01	Jan 20, 2009	Yes	None
"Take the Money and Run"	Steve Miller Band	1976	Classic Rock	Steve Miller Band 01	Jan 20, 2009	No	None
"The Joker"	Steve Miller Band	1973	Classic Rock	Steve Miller Band 01	Jan 20, 2009	No	None
"I Stand Alone"	Godsmack	2003	Nu-Metal	Single	Jan 20, 2009	Yes	None
"Feed the Tree"	Belly	1993	Alternative	Single	Jan 20, 2009	Yes	None
"Wind Me Up"	Ghost Hounds	2008	Rock	Single	Jan 20, 2009	Yes	None
"Typical"	Mutemath	2006	Alternative	Single	Jan 20, 2009	Yes	None
"War Zone"	Rob Zombie	2008	Nu-Metal	Single	Jan 20, 2009	No	None
"Cold Rain and Snow"	Grateful Dead	1967	Classic Rock	Grateful Dead 02	Jan 27, 2009	Yes	None
"Doin' That Rag"	Grateful Dead	1969	Classic Rock	Grateful Dead 02	Jan 27, 2009	No	None
"Don't Ease Me In"	Grateful Dead	1980	Classic Rock	Grateful Dead 02	Jan 27, 2009	No	None
"Fire on the Mountain"	Grateful Dead	1978	Classic Rock	Grateful Dead 02	Jan 27, 2009	Yes	None
"Hell in a Bucket"	Grateful Dead	1987	Classic Rock	Grateful Dead 02	Jan 27, 2009	No	None
"Uncle John's Band"	Grateful Dead	1970	Classic Rock	Grateful Dead 02	Jan 27, 2009	Yes	None
"The Boys Are Back in Town" (Live)	Thin Lizzy	1977	Classic Rock	Thin Lizzy 01	Feb 3, 2009	No	None
"Cowboy Song" (Live)	Thin Lizzy	1977	Classic Rock	Thin Lizzy 01	Feb 3, 2009	Yes	None
"Jailbreak" (Live)	Thin Lizzy	1977	Classic Rock	Thin Lizzy 01	Feb 3, 2009	No	None
"Precious"	The Pretenders	1980	New Wave	Single	Feb 3, 2009	No	None
"Hit Me With Your Best Shot"	Pat Benatar	1980	Classic Rock	Single	Feb 3, 2009	Yes	None
"Break My Heart"	Nikko	2009	Pop-Rock	Single	Feb 3, 2009	Yes	None
"Don't Tell Me"	Nikko	2009	Pop-Rock	Single	Feb 3, 2009	Yes	None
"Creepin' Up the Backstairs"	The Fratellis	2006	Alternative	The Fratellis 01	Feb 10, 2009	No	None
"Flathead"	The Fratellis	2006	Alternative	The Fratellis 01	Feb 10, 2009	No	None
"Henrietta"	The Fratellis	2006	Alternative	The Fratellis 01	Feb 10, 2009	No	None
"More Human than Human"	White Zombie	1995	Metal	Single	Feb 17, 2009	No	None
"Black Sunshine"	White Zombie	1992	Metal	Single	Feb 17, 2009	No	None
"Wasted Again"	Turbonegro	2005	Punk	Single	Feb 17, 2009	No	None
"3 Dimes Down"	Drive-By Truckers	2008	Country	Alt-Country 01	Feb 24, 2009	No	None
"Can't Let Go"	Lucinda Williams	1998	Country	Alt-Country 01	Feb 24, 2009	Yes	None
"People Got a Lotta Nerve"	Neko Case	2009	Country	Alt-Country 01	Feb 24, 2009	No	None
"Time Bomb" (Live)	Old 97's	2005	Country	Alt-Country 01	Feb 24, 2009	No	None
"Satellite Radio"	Steve Earle	2007	Country	Alt-Country 01	Feb 24, 2009	Yes	None
"Futures"	Jimmy Eat World	2004	Pop-Rock	Jimmy Eat World 01	Feb 24, 2009	Yes	None
"Lucky Denver Mint"	Jimmy Eat World	1999	Pop-Rock	Jimmy Eat World 01	Feb 24, 2009	Yes	None
"Sweetness"	Jimmy Eat World	2001	Pop-Rock	Jimmy Eat World 01	Feb 24, 2009	Yes	None
"New"	No Doubt	1999	Pop-Rock	Single	Mar 3, 2009	Yes	None
"Love Struck Baby"	Stevie Ray Vaughan and Double Trouble	1983	Blues	Texas Flood	Mar 3, 2009	Yes	None
"Pride and Joy"	Stevie Ray Vaughan and Double Trouble	1983	Blues	Texas Flood	Mar 3, 2009	Yes	Pro Guitar/Bass
"Texas Flood"	Stevie Ray Vaughan and Double Trouble	1983	Blues	Texas Flood	Mar 3, 2009	Yes	None
"Tell Me"	Stevie Ray Vaughan and Double Trouble	1983	Blues	Texas Flood	Mar 3, 2009	Yes	None
"Testify"	Stevie Ray Vaughan and Double Trouble	1983	Blues	Texas Flood	Mar 3, 2009	Yes	None
"Rude Mood"	Stevie Ray Vaughan and Double Trouble	1983	Blues	Texas Flood	Mar 3, 2009	Yes	None
"Mary Had a Little Lamb"	Stevie Ray Vaughan and Double Trouble	1983	Blues	Texas Flood	Mar 3, 2009	Yes	None
"Dirty Pool"	Stevie Ray Vaughan and Double Trouble	1983	Blues	Texas Flood	Mar 3, 2009	Yes	None
"I'm Cryin'"	Stevie Ray Vaughan and Double Trouble	1983	Blues	Texas Flood	Mar 3, 2009	Yes	None
"Lenny"	Stevie Ray Vaughan and Double Trouble	1983	Blues	Texas Flood	Mar 3, 2009	Yes	None
"All I Want"	The Offspring	1997	Punk	Single	Mar 10, 2009	Yes	None
"The Kids Aren't Alright"	The Offspring	1998	Punk	Single	Mar 10, 2009	No	None
"Losing My Religion"	R.E.M.	1991	Alternative	Single	Mar 10, 2009	Yes	None
"The Way That It Shows"	Richard Thompson	1994	Rock	Single	Mar 10, 2009	Yes	None
"Pick Up the Pieces"	Average White Band	1974	R&B/Soul/Funk	Get the Funk Out 01	Mar 17, 2009	Yes	None
"Shining Star"	Earth, Wind & Fire	1975	R&B/Soul/Funk	Get the Funk Out 01	Mar 17, 2009	Yes	None
"Get Up (I Feel Like Being a) Sex Machine - Pt 1"	James Brown	1970	R&B/Soul/Funk	Get the Funk Out 01	Mar 17, 2009	No	None
"Thrash Unreal"	Against Me!	2007	Punk	Single	Mar 17, 2009	No	None
"All the Things That Go to Make Heaven and Earth"	The New Pornographers	2007	Indie Rock	Single	Mar 17, 2009	No	None
"Use It"	The New Pornographers	2005	Indie Rock	Single	Mar 17, 2009	No	None
"Last Resort"	Papa Roach	2000	Nu-Metal	Single	Mar 17, 2009	No	None
"Lifeline"	Papa Roach	2009	Nu-Metal	Single	Mar 17, 2009	Yes	None
"Once"	Pearl Jam	1991	Grunge	Ten	Mar 24, 2009	No	None
"Even Flow"	Pearl Jam	1991	Grunge	Ten	Mar 24, 2009	Yes	Backing vocals & Pro Guitar/Bass
"Why Go"	Pearl Jam	1991	Grunge	Ten	Mar 24, 2009	Yes	Backing vocals
"Black"	Pearl Jam	1991	Grunge	Ten	Mar 24, 2009	No	Backing vocals
"Jeremy"	Pearl Jam	1991	Grunge	Ten	Mar 24, 2009	No	Backing vocals
"Oceans"	Pearl Jam	1991	Grunge	Ten	Mar 24, 2009	Yes	Backing vocals
"Porch"	Pearl Jam	1991	Grunge	Ten	Mar 24, 2009	Yes	None
"Garden"	Pearl Jam	1991	Grunge	Ten	Mar 24, 2009	Yes	Backing vocals
"Deep"	Pearl Jam	1991	Grunge	Ten	Mar 24, 2009	No	Backing vocals
"Release"	Pearl Jam	1991	Grunge	Ten	Mar 24, 2009	Yes	None
"Master/Slave"	Pearl Jam	1991	Grunge	Ten	Mar 24, 2009	Yes	None
"Don't Stop Believing"	Journey	1981	Classic Rock	Single	Mar 31, 2009	No	None
"Heartbreaker"	Pat Benatar	1979	Classic Rock	Single	Mar 31, 2009	Yes	None
"Geraldine"	Glasvegas	2008	Alternative	Single	Mar 31, 2009	Yes	None
"C'mon C'mon"	The Von Bondies	2004	Alternative	Single	Mar 31, 2009	No	None
"I Can't Keep My Eyes Off of You"	SpongeBob SquarePants	2009	Novelty	SpongeBob SquarePants 01	Mar 31, 2009	Yes	None
"The Best Day Ever"	SpongeBob SquarePants	2009	Novelty	SpongeBob SquarePants 01	Mar 31, 2009	Yes	None
"Where's Gary?"	SpongeBob SquarePants	2009	Novelty	SpongeBob SquarePants 01	Mar 31, 2009	Yes	None
"New Slang"	The Shins	2001	Indie Rock	Single	Apr 7, 2009	No	None
"Warriors of Time"	Black Tide	2008	Metal	Single	Apr 7, 2009	Yes	None
"Waking the Demon"	Bullet for My Valentine	2008	Metal	Single	Apr 7, 2009	No	None
"Beer for My Horses"	Toby Keith	2002	Country	Toby Keith 01	Apr 7, 2009	No	None
"I Love This Bar"	Toby Keith	2003	Country	Toby Keith 01	Apr 7, 2009	No	None
"She's a Hottie"	Toby Keith	2008	Country	Toby Keith 01	Apr 7, 2009	No	None
"Should've Been a Cowboy"	Toby Keith	1993	Country	Toby Keith 01	Apr 7, 2009	Yes	None
"Who's Your Daddy?"	Toby Keith	2002	Country	Toby Keith 01	Apr 7, 2009	Yes	None
"How Do You Like Me Now?!"	Toby Keith	1999	Country	Toby Keith 01	Apr 7, 2009	Yes	None
"Chinese Democracy"	Guns N' Roses	2008	Rock	Chinese Democracy	Apr 14, 2009	No	None
"Better"	Guns N' Roses	2008	Rock	Chinese Democracy	Apr 14, 2009	Yes	None
"Street of Dreams"	Guns N' Roses	2008	Rock	Chinese Democracy	Apr 14, 2009	No	None
"If the World"	Guns N' Roses	2008	Rock	Chinese Democracy	Apr 14, 2009	Yes	None
"There Was a Time"	Guns N' Roses	2008	Rock	Chinese Democracy	Apr 14, 2009	No	None
"Catcher in the Rye"	Guns N' Roses	2008	Rock	Chinese Democracy	Apr 14, 2009	Yes	None
"Scraped"	Guns N' Roses	2008	Rock	Chinese Democracy	Apr 14, 2009	Yes	None
"Riad N' the Bedouins"	Guns N' Roses	2008	Rock	Chinese Democracy	Apr 14, 2009	Yes	None
"Sorry"	Guns N' Roses	2008	Rock	Chinese Democracy	Apr 14, 2009	No	None
"I.R.S."	Guns N' Roses	2008	Rock	Chinese Democracy	Apr 14, 2009	No	None
"Madagascar"	Guns N' Roses	2008	Rock	Chinese Democracy	Apr 14, 2009	No	None
"This I Love"	Guns N' Roses	2008	Rock	Chinese Democracy	Apr 14, 2009	No	None
"Prostitute"	Guns N' Roses	2008	Rock	Chinese Democracy	Apr 14, 2009	No	None
"Ridin' the Storm Out"	REO Speedwagon	1973	Classic Rock	REO Speedwagon / Styx Tour '09	Apr 21, 2009	No	None
"Roll with the Changes"	REO Speedwagon	1978	Classic Rock	REO Speedwagon / Styx Tour '09	Apr 21, 2009	Yes	None
"Take It on the Run"	REO Speedwagon	1988	Classic Rock	REO Speedwagon / Styx Tour '09	Apr 21, 2009	No	None
"Blue Collar Man (Long Nights) (Rock Band Re-Record)"	Styx	1978	Classic Rock	REO Speedwagon / Styx Tour '09	Apr 21, 2009	Yes	None
"Renegade (Rock Band Re-Record)"	Styx	1978	Classic Rock	REO Speedwagon / Styx Tour '09	Apr 21, 2009	Yes	None
"Too Much Time on My Hands (Rock Band Re-Record)"	Styx	1981	Classic Rock	REO Speedwagon / Styx Tour '09	Apr 21, 2009	No	None
"Can't Stop Rockin'"	Styx/REO Speedwagon	2009	Classic Rock	REO Speedwagon / Styx Tour '09	Apr 21, 2009	Yes	None
"Alone in My Head"	Hautewerk	2006	Indie Rock	Hautewerk 01	Apr 21, 2009	Yes	None
"I Know Where You Came From"	Hautewerk	2006	Indie Rock	Hautewerk 01	Apr 21, 2009	Yes	None
"Stop Start Again"	Hautewerk	2006	Indie Rock	Hautewerk 01	Apr 21, 2009	Yes	None
"Up the Beach"	Jane's Addiction	1988	Alternative	Nothing's Shocking	Apr 28, 2009	Yes	None
"Ocean Size"	Jane's Addiction	1988	Alternative	Nothing's Shocking	Apr 28, 2009	Yes	None
"Had a Dad"	Jane's Addiction	1988	Alternative	Nothing's Shocking	Apr 28, 2009	No	None
"Ted, Just Admit It..."	Jane's Addiction	1988	Alternative	Nothing's Shocking	Apr 28, 2009	No	None
"Standing in the Shower... Thinking"	Jane's Addiction	1988	Alternative	Nothing's Shocking	Apr 28, 2009	No	None
"Summertime Rolls"	Jane's Addiction	1988	Alternative	Nothing's Shocking	Apr 28, 2009	No	None
"Idiots Rule"	Jane's Addiction	1988	Alternative	Nothing's Shocking	Apr 28, 2009	No	None
"Jane Says"	Jane's Addiction	1988	Alternative	Nothing's Shocking	Apr 28, 2009	No	Pro Guitar/Bass
"Thank You Boys"	Jane's Addiction	1988	Alternative	Nothing's Shocking	Apr 28, 2009	Yes	None
"Pigs in Zen"	Jane's Addiction	1988	Alternative	Nothing's Shocking	Apr 28, 2009	No	None
"Take Me Out"	Franz Ferdinand	2004	Alternative	Franz Ferdinand 01	May 5, 2009	Yes	None
"Lucid Dreams"	Franz Ferdinand	2009	Alternative	Franz Ferdinand 01	May 5, 2009	Yes	None
"Do You Want To"	Franz Ferdinand	2005	Alternative	Franz Ferdinand 01	May 5, 2009	Yes	None
"Smooth Criminal"	Alien Ant Farm	2001	Rock	Single	May 5, 2009	No	None
"Blue Sky"	The Allman Brothers Band	1972	Southern Rock	Single	May 5, 2009	Yes	None
"Midnight Rider"	The Allman Brothers Band	1970	Southern Rock	Single	May 5, 2009	Yes	None
"Drain the Blood"	The Distillers	2003	Punk	Single	May 5, 2009	No	None
"Naked Eye"	Luscious Jackson	1996	Alternative	Single	May 5, 2009	No	None
"Idealistic Types"	Prong	2007	Metal	Single	May 5, 2009	No	None
"The Banishment"	Prong	2007	Metal	Single	May 5, 2009	No	None
"Bad Luck"	Social Distortion	1992	Punk	Social Distortion 01	May 12, 2009	No	None
"Ring of Fire"	Social Distortion	1990	Punk	Social Distortion 01	May 12, 2009	Yes	None
"Story of My Life"	Social Distortion	1990	Punk	Social Distortion 01	May 12, 2009	Yes	None
"Stricken"	Disturbed	2005	Nu-Metal	Single	May 12, 2009	No	None
"Stupify"	Disturbed	2000	Nu-Metal	Single	May 12, 2009	No	None
"Black Friday"	Steely Dan	1975	Classic Rock	Single	May 12, 2009	Yes	None
"My Old School"	Steely Dan	1973	Classic Rock	Single	May 12, 2009	No	None
"Radio Radio"	Elvis Costello	1978	Rock	Single	May 12, 2009	Yes	None
"School's Out" (Live)	Alice Cooper	1995	Rock	Alice Cooper 01	May 19, 2009	Yes	None
"I'm Eighteen" (Live)	Alice Cooper	1995	Rock	Alice Cooper 01	May 19, 2009	Yes	None
"Billion Dollar Babies" (Live)	Alice Cooper	1995	Rock	Alice Cooper 01	May 19, 2009	No	None
"Poison"	Alice Cooper	1989	Rock	Alice Cooper 01	May 19, 2009	No	None
"Under My Wheels" (Live)	Alice Cooper	1995	Rock	Alice Cooper 01	May 19, 2009	Yes	None
"Vengeance is Mine"	Alice Cooper	2008	Rock	Alice Cooper 01	May 19, 2009	No	None
"Liar (It Takes One to Know One)"	Taking Back Sunday	2006	Emo	Taking Back Sunday 01	May 19, 2009	Yes	None
"MakeDamnSure"	Taking Back Sunday	2006	Emo	Taking Back Sunday 01	May 19, 2009	No	None
"What's It Feel Like to Be a Ghost?"	Taking Back Sunday	2006	Emo	Taking Back Sunday 01	May 19, 2009	No	None
"Kids Don't Follow"	The Replacements	1982	Punk	Single	May 19, 2009	No	None
"Cuz U R Next"	Ministry	2008	Metal	Ministry 01	May 26, 2009	No	None
"LiesLiesLies"	Ministry	2006	Metal	Ministry 01	May 26, 2009	No	None
"The Great Satan"	Ministry	2006	Metal	Ministry 01	May 26, 2009	No	None
"She's Not There"	The Zombies	1965	Classic Rock	Single	May 26, 2009	Yes	None
"Tell Her No"	The Zombies	1965	Classic Rock	Single	May 26, 2009	Yes	None
"Linger"	The Cranberries	1993	Alternative	Single	May 26, 2009	Yes	None
"Shimmer & Shine"	Ben Harper and Relentless7	2009	Alternative	Bonnaroo 01	Jun 2, 2009	Yes	None
"A Favor House Atlantic"	Coheed and Cambria	2004	Prog	Bonnaroo 01	Jun 2, 2009	Yes	None
"The Running Free"	Coheed and Cambria	2007	Prog	Bonnaroo 01	Jun 2, 2009	No	None
"Wilson" (Live)	Phish	1995	Rock	Bonnaroo 01	Jun 2, 2009	Yes	None
"Steady at the Wheel"	Shooter Jennings	2005	Country	Bonnaroo 01	Jun 2, 2009	Yes	None
"Wolf Like Me"	TV on the Radio	2006	Indie Rock	Bonnaroo 01	Jun 2, 2009	No	None
"Aces High" (Live)	Iron Maiden	2008	Metal	Iron Maiden 01	Jun 9, 2009	Yes	None
"2 Minutes to Midnight"	Iron Maiden	1984	Metal	Iron Maiden 01	Jun 9, 2009	No	None
"The Trooper"	Iron Maiden	1983	Metal	Iron Maiden 01	Jun 9, 2009	No	None
"Wasted Years"	Iron Maiden	1986	Metal	Iron Maiden 01	Jun 9, 2009	Yes	None
"The Number of the Beast" [Original Version]	Iron Maiden	1982	Metal	Iron Maiden 01	Jun 9, 2009	No	None
"Run to the Hills" [Original Version]	Iron Maiden	1982	Metal	Iron Maiden 01	Jun 9, 2009	No	None
"Can I Play with Madness"	Iron Maiden	1988	Metal	Iron Maiden 01	Jun 9, 2009	No	None
"The Clairvoyant"	Iron Maiden	1988	Metal	Iron Maiden 01	Jun 9, 2009	No	None
"Powerslave"	Iron Maiden	1984	Metal	Iron Maiden 01	Jun 9, 2009	No	None
"Fear of the Dark" (Live)	Iron Maiden	2008	Metal	Iron Maiden 01	Jun 9, 2009	Yes	None
"Hallowed Be Thy Name" (Live)	Iron Maiden	2008	Metal	Iron Maiden 01	Jun 9, 2009	No	None
"Iron Maiden" (Live)	Iron Maiden	2008	Metal	Iron Maiden 01	Jun 9, 2009	No	None
"Bring Me to Life"	Evanescence	2003	Nu-Metal	Evanescence 01	Jun 16, 2009	Yes	None
"Call Me When You're Sober"	Evanescence	2006	Nu-Metal	Evanescence 01	Jun 16, 2009	No	None
"Weight of the World"	Evanescence	2006	Nu-Metal	Evanescence 01	Jun 16, 2009	No	None
"Back from the Dead"	Spinal Tap	2009	Metal	Spinal Tap 01	Jun 16, 2009	No	None
"Rock 'n' Roll Nightmare"	Spinal Tap	2009	Metal	Spinal Tap 01	Jun 16, 2009	No	None
"Saucy Jack"	Spinal Tap	2009	Metal	Spinal Tap 01	Jun 16, 2009	No	None
"Warmer Than Hell"	Spinal Tap	2009	Metal	Spinal Tap 01	Jun 16, 2009	No	None
"The Downfall of Us All"	A Day to Remember	2009	Punk	Warped Tour 2009 01	Jun 23, 2009	Yes	None
"21st Century (Digital Boy)"	Bad Religion	1990	Punk	Warped Tour 2009 01	Jun 23, 2009	No	None
"I Didn't Say I Was Powerful, I Said I Was a Wizard"	Chiodos	2007	Emo	Warped Tour 2009 01	Jun 23, 2009	No	None
"The Flood"	Escape the Fate	2008	Emo	Warped Tour 2009 01	Jun 23, 2009	Yes	None
"Reinventing Your Exit"	Underoath	2004	Emo	Warped Tour 2009 01	Jun 23, 2009	Yes	None
"Little of Your Time"	Maroon 5	2007	Pop-Rock	Maroon 5 01	Jun 23, 2009	No	None
"Makes Me Wonder"	Maroon 5	2007	Pop-Rock	Maroon 5 01	Jun 23, 2009	No	None
"Wake Up Call"	Maroon 5	2007	Pop-Rock	Maroon 5 01	Jun 23, 2009	No	None
"Brother"	Pearl Jam	2009	Grunge	Ten Bonus Pack	Jun 23, 2009	No	Backing vocals
"Alive" (Live: Drop in the Park)	Pearl Jam	2009	Grunge	Ten Bonus Pack	Jun 23, 2009	No	None
"State of Love and Trust" (Live: Drop in the Park)	Pearl Jam	2009	Grunge	Ten Bonus Pack	Jun 23, 2009	No	None
"Blue Morning, Blue Day"	Foreigner	1978	Classic Rock	Foreigner 01	Jun 30, 2009	Yes	None
"Feels Like the First Time"	Foreigner	1979	Classic Rock	Foreigner 01	Jun 30, 2009	Yes	None
"Headknocker"	Foreigner	1977	Classic Rock	Foreigner 01	Jun 30, 2009	Yes	None
"Weapon of Choice"	Black Rebel Motorcycle Club	2007	Alternative	Single	Jun 30, 2009	Yes	None
"Sweet Talk"	Dear and the Headlights	2007	Indie Rock	Warped Tour 2009 02	Jun 30, 2009	Yes	None
"Hey John, What's Your Name Again?"	The Devil Wears Prada	2007	Metal	Warped Tour 2009 02	Jun 30, 2009	No	None
"Image of the Invisible"	Thrice	2005	Rock	Warped Tour 2009 02	Jun 30, 2009	Yes	None
"21 Guns" (Note: Song is also available as part of "21st Century Breakdown" (released Nov. 13, 2012).)	Green Day	2009	Rock	Green Day 01	Jul 7, 2009	No	Backing vocals
"East Jesus Nowhere"	Green Day	2009	Rock	Green Day 01	Jul 7, 2009	No	Backing vocals
"Know Your Enemy"	Green Day	2009	Rock	Green Day 01	Jul 7, 2009	No	Backing vocals
"Conquer All"	Behemoth	2004	Metal	Mayhem Tour 2009	Jul 7, 2009	No	None
"What a Horrible Night to Have a Curse"	The Black Dahlia Murder	2007	Metal	Mayhem Tour 2009	Jul 7, 2009	No	None
"Hammer Smashed Face"	Cannibal Corpse	1992	Metal	Mayhem Tour 2009	Jul 7, 2009	No	None
"Empire of the Gun"	God Forbid	2009	Metal	Mayhem Tour 2009	Jul 7, 2009	No	None
"Embedded"	Job for a Cowboy	2007	Metal	Mayhem Tour 2009	Jul 7, 2009	No	None
"Disposable Teens"	Marilyn Manson	2000	Metal	Mayhem Tour 2009	Jul 7, 2009	No	None
"Black Magic"	Slayer	1983	Metal	Mayhem Tour 2009	Jul 7, 2009	No	None
"This Is Exile"	Whitechapel	2008	Metal	Mayhem Tour 2009	Jul 7, 2009	No	None
"All Going Out Together"	Big Dipper	1987	Indie Rock	Big Dipper 01	Jul 14, 2009	Yes	None
"She's Fetching"	Big Dipper	1987	Indie Rock	Big Dipper 01	Jul 14, 2009	Yes	None
"Younger Bums"	Big Dipper	1987	Indie Rock	Big Dipper 01	Jul 14, 2009	No	None
"Dissident Aggressor" (Live)	Judas Priest	2009	Metal	Judas Priest 01	Jul 14, 2009	No	None
"Eat Me Alive" (Live)	Judas Priest	2009	Metal	Judas Priest 01	Jul 14, 2009	No	None
"Prophecy" (Live)	Judas Priest	2009	Metal	Judas Priest 01	Jul 14, 2009	No	None
"Hang You from the Heavens"	The Dead Weather	2009	Alternative	The Dead Weather 01	Jul 14, 2009	No	None
"No Hassle Night"	The Dead Weather	2009	Alternative	The Dead Weather 01	Jul 14, 2009	Yes	None
"Treat Me Like Your Mother"	The Dead Weather	2009	Alternative	The Dead Weather 01	Jul 14, 2009	Yes	None
"Crawl"	Kings of Leon	2008	Rock	Kings of Leon 01	Jul 21, 2009	No	None
"Molly's Chambers"	Kings of Leon	2003	Rock	Kings of Leon 01	Jul 21, 2009	No	None
"Sex on Fire"	Kings of Leon	2008	Rock	Kings of Leon 01	Jul 21, 2009	No	None
"Last One to Die"	Rancid	2009	Punk	Rancid 01	Jul 21, 2009	No	None
"Ruby Soho"	Rancid	1995	Punk	Rancid 01	Jul 21, 2009	Yes	None
"Time Bomb"	Rancid	1995	Punk	Rancid 01	Jul 21, 2009	No	None
"Prayer of the Refugee"	Rise Against	2006	Punk	Rise Against 01	Jul 21, 2009	Yes	None
"Re-Education (Through Labor)"	Rise Against	2008	Punk	Rise Against 01	Jul 21, 2009	Yes	None
"Savior"	Rise Against	2008	Punk	Rise Against 01	Jul 21, 2009	Yes	None
"Sweetness & Light"	Lush	1990	Alternative	Single	Jul 21, 2009	Yes	None
"Down"	Blink-182	2003	Punk	Blink-182 01	Jul 28, 2009	Yes	None
"Feeling This"	Blink-182	2003	Punk	Blink-182 01	Jul 28, 2009	No	None
"The Rock Show"	Blink-182	2001	Punk	Blink-182 01	Jul 28, 2009	No	None
"100,000 Years" (Live)	Kiss	1975	Classic Rock	Kiss 01	Jul 28, 2009	No	None
"Deuce" (Live)	Kiss	1975	Classic Rock	Kiss 01	Jul 28, 2009	No	None
"Parasite" (Live)	Kiss	1975	Classic Rock	Kiss 01	Jul 28, 2009	Yes	None
"My Name Is Jonas"	Weezer	1994	Alternative	Weezer 02	Jul 28, 2009	Yes	None
"Pork and Beans"	Weezer	2008	Alternative	Weezer 02	Jul 28, 2009	Yes	None
"Undone - The Sweater Song"	Weezer	1994	Alternative	Weezer 02	Jul 28, 2009	No	None
"Out Here All Night"	Damone	2006	Rock	Single	Jul 28, 2009	Yes	None
"(Funky) Sex Farm"	Spinal Tap	2009	Metal	Spinal Tap's Tap Ten	Aug 4, 2009	No	None
"(Listen to the) Flower People (Reggae Stylee)"	Spinal Tap	2009	Metal	Spinal Tap's Tap Ten	Aug 4, 2009	Yes	None
"America"	Spinal Tap	2009	Metal	Spinal Tap's Tap Ten	Aug 4, 2009	No	None
"Big Bottom"	Spinal Tap	2009	Metal	Spinal Tap's Tap Ten	Aug 4, 2009	No	None
"Cups and Cakes"	Spinal Tap	2009	Metal	Spinal Tap's Tap Ten	Aug 4, 2009	Yes	None
"Gimme Some Money"	Spinal Tap	2009	Metal	Spinal Tap's Tap Ten	Aug 4, 2009	No	None
"Heavy Duty"	Spinal Tap	2009	Metal	Spinal Tap's Tap Ten	Aug 4, 2009	Yes	None
"Hell Hole"	Spinal Tap	2009	Metal	Spinal Tap's Tap Ten	Aug 4, 2009	No	None
"Rock 'n' Roll Creation"	Spinal Tap	2009	Metal	Spinal Tap's Tap Ten	Aug 4, 2009	Yes	None
"Stonehenge"	Spinal Tap	2009	Metal	Spinal Tap's Tap Ten	Aug 4, 2009	No	None
"Tonight I'm Gonna Rock You Tonight"	Spinal Tap	2009	Metal	Spinal Tap's Tap Ten	Aug 4, 2009	No	None
"Clint Eastwood"	Gorillaz	2001	Hip-Hop/Rap	Gorillaz 01	Aug 11, 2009	No	None
"Feel Good Inc."	Gorillaz	2005	Hip-Hop/Rap	Gorillaz 01	Aug 11, 2009	No	None
"Re-Hash"	Gorillaz	2001	Hip-Hop/Rap	Gorillaz 01	Aug 11, 2009	No	None
"Piece of My Heart"	Janis Joplin	1968	Classic Rock	Single	Aug 11, 2009	Yes	None
"Chest Fever" (Live)	The Band	1972	Classic Rock	Single	Aug 11, 2009	No	None
"White Rabbit"	Jefferson Airplane	1967	Classic Rock	Single	Aug 11, 2009	No	None
"Magic Bus" (Live at Leeds)	The Who	1970	Classic Rock	Single	Aug 11, 2009	No	None
"No Rain"	Blind Melon	1992	Alternative	Single	Aug 18, 2009	No	None
"There's No Other Way"	Blur	1991	Alternative	Single	Aug 18, 2009	No	None
"I'm Shipping Up to Boston"	Dropkick Murphys	2005	Punk	Single	Aug 18, 2009	No	None
"Inside Out"	Eve 6	1998	Alternative	Single	Aug 18, 2009	No	Pro Guitar/Bass
"I Predict a Riot"	Kaiser Chiefs	2005	Indie Rock	Single	Aug 18, 2009	No	None
"All My Life"	Foo Fighters	2002	Alternative	Foo Fighters 02	Aug 18, 2009	No	None
"I'll Stick Around"	Foo Fighters	1995	Alternative	Foo Fighters 02	Aug 18, 2009	No	None
"Lonely as You"	Foo Fighters	2002	Alternative	Foo Fighters 02	Aug 18, 2009	No	None
"Mony Mony"	Billy Idol	1981	Rock	Single	Aug 25, 2009	No	None
"Rebel Yell"	Billy Idol	1983	Rock	Single	Aug 25, 2009	No	None
"Don't Stop"	Fleetwood Mac	1977	Classic Rock	Single	Aug 25, 2009	Yes	None
"World Turning"	Fleetwood Mac	1975	Classic Rock	Single	Aug 25, 2009	Yes	None
"She's a Genius"	Jet	2009	Rock	Single	Aug 25, 2009	No	None
"I Won't Back Down"	Tom Petty	1989	Rock	Single	Aug 25, 2009	Yes	None
"Runnin' Down a Dream"	Tom Petty	1989	Rock	Single	Aug 25, 2009	Yes	None
"Bat Country"	Avenged Sevenfold	2005	Metal	Single	Sep 1, 2009	No	None
"Town Called Malice"	The Jam	1982	New Wave	Single	Sep 1, 2009	No	None
"Going Underground"	The Jam	1980	New Wave	Single	Sep 1, 2009	Yes	None
"Supersonic" (Live)	Oasis	1994	Rock	Single	Sep 1, 2009	No	None
"Guerrilla Radio"	Rage Against the Machine	1999	Alternative	Single	Sep 1, 2009	No	None
"And She Was"	Talking Heads	1985	New Wave	Talking Heads 01	Sep 1, 2009	Yes	None
"Crosseyed and Painless"	Talking Heads	1980	New Wave	Talking Heads 01	Sep 1, 2009	Yes	None
"Girlfriend Is Better"	Talking Heads	1983	New Wave	Talking Heads 01	Sep 1, 2009	Yes	None
"Once in a Lifetime"	Talking Heads	1980	New Wave	Talking Heads 01	Sep 1, 2009	No	None
"Take Me to the River"	Talking Heads	1978	New Wave	Talking Heads 01	Sep 1, 2009	No	None
"Less Talk More Rokk"	Freezepop	2007	Pop/Dance/Electronic	Freezepop 01	Sep 8, 2009	No	None
"Get Ready 2 Rokk"	Freezepop	2000	Pop/Dance/Electronic	Freezepop 01	Sep 8, 2009	Yes	None
"Science Genius Girl"	Freezepop	2000	Pop/Dance/Electronic	Freezepop 01	Sep 8, 2009	Yes	None
"Re: Your Brains"	Jonathan Coulton	2006	Pop-Rock	The PAX 2009 Collection	Sep 8, 2009	No	None
"Origin of Species"	MC Frontalot	2007	Hip-Hop/Rap	The PAX 2009 Collection	Sep 8, 2009	No	None
"Opening Band"	Paul and Storm	2005	Pop-Rock	The PAX 2009 Collection	Sep 8, 2009	No	None
"Kryptonite"	3 Doors Down	2000	Rock	Single	Sep 8, 2009	Yes	None
"Miss Murder"	AFI	2006	Emo	Single	Sep 8, 2009	No	None
"Gasoline"	Audioslave	2002	Rock	Single	Sep 8, 2009	No	None
"ABC"	Jackson 5	1970	Pop-Rock	Single	Sep 8, 2009	Yes	None
"666" (Rock Band Re-Record)	Anvil	1982	Metal	Anvil 01	Sep 15, 2009	No	None
"Metal on Metal" (Rock Band Re-Record)	Anvil	1982	Metal	Anvil 01	Sep 15, 2009	No	None
"This is Thirteen"	Anvil	2007	Metal	Anvil 01	Sep 15, 2009	No	None
"Pick Me Up"	Dinosaur Jr.	2007	Alternative	Single	Sep 15, 2009	Yes	None
"The Wagon"	Dinosaur Jr.	1991	Alternative	Single	Sep 15, 2009	No	None
"Hand Me Down World"	The Guess Who	1970	Classic Rock	Single	Sep 15, 2009	Yes	None
"No Time"	The Guess Who	1970	Classic Rock	Single	Sep 15, 2009	Yes	None
"Rock Your Socks"	Tenacious D	2001	Rock	Single	Sep 15, 2009	No	None
"Tribute"	Tenacious D	2001	Rock	Single	Sep 15, 2009	No	None
"Gonna See My Friend"	Pearl Jam	2009	Grunge	Backspacer	Sep 20, 2009	No	Backing vocals
"Got Some"	Pearl Jam	2009	Grunge	Backspacer	Sep 20, 2009	No	Backing vocals
"The Fixer"	Pearl Jam	2009	Grunge	Backspacer	Sep 20, 2009	Yes	Backing vocals
"Johnny Guitar"	Pearl Jam	2009	Grunge	Backspacer	Sep 20, 2009	No	Backing vocals
"Just Breathe"	Pearl Jam	2009	Grunge	Backspacer	Sep 20, 2009	No	Backing vocals
"Amongst the Waves"	Pearl Jam	2009	Grunge	Backspacer	Sep 20, 2009	No	None
"Unthought Known"	Pearl Jam	2009	Grunge	Backspacer	Sep 20, 2009	Yes	Backing vocals
"Supersonic"	Pearl Jam	2009	Grunge	Backspacer	Sep 20, 2009	No	Backing vocals
"Speed of Sound"	Pearl Jam	2009	Grunge	Backspacer	Sep 20, 2009	Yes	Backing vocals
"Force of Nature"	Pearl Jam	2009	Grunge	Backspacer	Sep 20, 2009	No	None
"The End"	Pearl Jam	2009	Grunge	Backspacer	Sep 20, 2009	No	None
"A Looking in View"	Alice in Chains	2009	Grunge	Alice in Chains 01	Sep 29, 2009	No	None
"Check My Brain"	Alice in Chains	2009	Grunge	Alice in Chains 01	Sep 29, 2009	Yes	None
"No Excuses"	Alice in Chains	1994	Grunge	Alice in Chains 01	Sep 29, 2009	Yes	None
"Rooster"	Alice in Chains	1992	Grunge	Alice in Chains 01	Sep 29, 2009	No	Pro Guitar/Bass
"Would?"	Alice in Chains	1992	Grunge	Alice in Chains 01	Sep 29, 2009	No	None
"I Will Not Bow"	Breaking Benjamin	2009	Rock	Breaking Benjamin 01	Sep 29, 2009	No	None
"So Cold"	Breaking Benjamin	2004	Rock	Breaking Benjamin 01	Sep 29, 2009	No	None
"The Diary of Jane"	Breaking Benjamin	2006	Rock	Breaking Benjamin 01	Sep 29, 2009	Yes	None
"U Suck"	Just Kait	2009	Rock	Single	Sep 29, 2009	No	None
"Hey Dude"	Kula Shaker	1996	Alternative	Single	Sep 29, 2009	No	None
"Knight on the Town"	Kula Shaker	1996	Alternative	Single	Sep 29, 2009	Yes	None
"Many Shades of Black"	The Raconteurs	2008	Rock	The Raconteurs 01	Oct 6, 2009	Yes	None
"Salute Your Solution"	The Raconteurs	2008	Rock	The Raconteurs 01	Oct 6, 2009	Yes	None
"Steady, As She Goes"	The Raconteurs	2006	Rock	The Raconteurs 01	Oct 6, 2009	Yes	None
"Dance Epidemic"	Electric Six	2006	Rock	Electric Six 01	Oct 6, 2009	No	None
"Gay Bar"	Electric Six	2003	Rock	Electric Six 01	Oct 6, 2009	No	None
"I Don't Like You"	Electric Six	2007	Rock	Electric Six 01	Oct 6, 2009	Yes	None
"Head Over Feet"	Alanis Morissette	1995	Alternative	Single	Oct 6, 2009	Yes	None
"Ironic"	Alanis Morissette	1995	Alternative	Single	Oct 6, 2009	No	None
"Handlebars"	Flobots	2008	Hip-Hop/Rap	Single	Oct 6, 2009	No	None
"(We Are) The Road Crew '08"	Motörhead	1980	Metal	Brütal Legend	Oct 13, 2009	No	None
"The Metal"	Tenacious D	2006	Rock	Brütal Legend	Oct 13, 2009	Yes	None
"More Than Meets the Eye"	Testament	2008	Metal	Brütal Legend	Oct 13, 2009	No	None
"Show Me the Way"	Black Tide	2008	Metal	Single	Oct 13, 2009	Yes	None
"What's My Age Again?"	Blink-182	1999	Punk	Single	Oct 13, 2009	No	None
"Satch Boogie"	Joe Satriani	1987	Rock	Single	Oct 13, 2009	Yes	None
"Surfing with the Alien"	Joe Satriani	1987	Rock	Single	Oct 13, 2009	Yes	None
"Icarus - Borne on Wings of Steel" (Live)	Kansas	1978	Prog	Single	Oct 13, 2009	Yes	None
"Point of Know Return" (Live)	Kansas	1978	Prog	Single	Oct 13, 2009	Yes	None
"Andres"	L7	1994	Grunge	Single	Oct 13, 2009	No	None
"Another One Bites the Dust"	Queen	1980	Classic Rock	Queen 01	Oct 20, 2009	No	None
"Crazy Little Thing Called Love"	Queen	1980	Classic Rock	Queen 01	Oct 20, 2009	Yes	None
"One Vision"	Queen	1986	Classic Rock	Queen 01	Oct 20, 2009	No	Pro Guitar/Bass
"Fat Bottomed Girls"	Queen	1978	Classic Rock	Queen 01	Oct 20, 2009	Yes	None
"I Want It All"	Queen	1989	Classic Rock	Queen 01	Oct 20, 2009	Yes	Pro Guitar/Bass
"I Want to Break Free"	Queen	1984	Classic Rock	Queen 01	Oct 20, 2009	No	Pro Guitar/Bass
"Killer Queen"	Queen	1974	Classic Rock	Queen 01	Oct 20, 2009	No	Pro Guitar/Bass
"Somebody to Love"	Queen	1976	Classic Rock	Queen 01	Oct 20, 2009	No	Pro Guitar/Bass
"Tie Your Mother Down"	Queen	1976	Classic Rock	Queen 01	Oct 20, 2009	No	None
"Under Pressure"	Queen	1983	Classic Rock	Queen 01	Oct 20, 2009	Yes	Pro Guitar/Bass
"Dragula"	Rob Zombie	1998	Nu-Metal	Rob Zombie 01	Oct 27, 2009	No	None
"Burn"	Rob Zombie	2009	Nu-Metal	Rob Zombie 01	Oct 27, 2009	No	None
"Superbeast"	Rob Zombie	1998	Nu-Metal	Rob Zombie 01	Oct 27, 2009	No	None
"White Unicorn"	Wolfmother	2005	Rock	Wolfmother 01	Oct 27, 2009	No	None
"New Moon Rising"	Wolfmother	2009	Rock	Wolfmother 01	Oct 27, 2009	Yes	None
"Pilgrim"	Wolfmother	2009	Rock	Wolfmother 01	Oct 27, 2009	Yes	None
"Sundial"	Wolfmother	2009	Rock	Wolfmother 01	Oct 27, 2009	Yes	None
"Woman"	Wolfmother	2005	Rock	Wolfmother 01	Oct 27, 2009	Yes	None
"Rock Me"	Liz Phair	2003	Pop-Rock	Single	Oct 27, 2009	No	None
"Best of Me"	Morningwood	2009	Pop-Rock	Single	Oct 27, 2009	Yes	None
"Sugarbaby"	Morningwood	2009	Pop-Rock	Single	Oct 27, 2009	No	None
"Best of You"	Foo Fighters	2005	Alternative	Foo Fighters 03	Nov 3, 2009	Yes	None
"The Pretender"	Foo Fighters	2007	Alternative	Foo Fighters 03	Nov 3, 2009	Yes	Pro Guitar/Bass
"Wheels"	Foo Fighters	2009	Alternative	Foo Fighters 03	Nov 3, 2009	Yes	None
"Word Forward"	Foo Fighters	2009	Alternative	Foo Fighters 03	Nov 3, 2009	Yes	None
"About a Girl"	Nirvana	1989	Grunge	Nirvana Bleach	Nov 3, 2009	Yes	None
"Blew"	Nirvana	1989	Grunge	Nirvana Bleach	Nov 3, 2009	Yes	None
"School"	Nirvana	1989	Grunge	Nirvana Bleach	Nov 3, 2009	Yes	None
"Fake Friends"	Joan Jett & The Blackhearts	1983	Punk	Single	Nov 3, 2009	Yes	None
"A Day Like This"	SpongeBob SquarePants	2009	Novelty	SpongeBob SquarePants 02	Nov 10, 2009	Yes	None
"Employee of the Month"	SpongeBob SquarePants	2006	Novelty	SpongeBob SquarePants 02	Nov 10, 2009	Yes	None
"Ridin' the Hook"	SpongeBob SquarePants	2006	Novelty	SpongeBob SquarePants 02	Nov 10, 2009	Yes	None
"Dead Leaves and the Dirty Ground"	The White Stripes	2001	Rock	The White Stripes 01	Nov 10, 2009	Yes	Pro Guitar/Bass
"Girl, You Have No Faith in Medicine"	The White Stripes	2003	Rock	The White Stripes 01	Nov 10, 2009	Yes	None
"Icky Thump"	The White Stripes	2007	Rock	The White Stripes 01	Nov 10, 2009	No	None
"Smash It Up (Part II)"	The Damned	1979	Punk	Single	Nov 10, 2009	Yes	None
"Club Foot"	Kasabian	2004	Indie Rock	Single	Nov 10, 2009	Yes	None
"Beautiful Thieves"	AFI	2009	Emo	AFI 01	Nov 17, 2009	No	None
"End Transmission"	AFI	2009	Emo	AFI 01	Nov 17, 2009	No	None
"Love Like Winter"	AFI	2006	Emo	AFI 01	Nov 17, 2009	No	None
"Medicate"	AFI	2009	Emo	AFI 01	Nov 17, 2009	No	None
"The Leaving Song Pt. II"	AFI	2003	Emo	AFI 01	Nov 17, 2009	No	None
"Walk Like An Egyptian"	The Bangles	1986	Rock	Single	Nov 17, 2009	Yes	None
"New Fang"	Them Crooked Vultures	2009	Rock	Single	Nov 17, 2009	Yes	None
"A Thing About You" (Live)	Tom Petty and the Heartbreakers	2009	Rock	Tom Petty & the Heartbreakers Live Anthology 01	Nov 24, 2009	Yes	None
"American Girl" (Live)	Tom Petty and the Heartbreakers	2009	Rock	Tom Petty & the Heartbreakers Live Anthology 01	Nov 24, 2009	No	None
"Even the Losers" (Live)	Tom Petty and the Heartbreakers	2009	Rock	Tom Petty & the Heartbreakers Live Anthology 01	Nov 24, 2009	No	None
"Here Comes My Girl" (Live)	Tom Petty and the Heartbreakers	2009	Rock	Tom Petty & the Heartbreakers Live Anthology 01	Nov 24, 2009	Yes	None
"Mary Jane's Last Dance" (Live)	Tom Petty and the Heartbreakers	2009	Rock	Tom Petty & the Heartbreakers Live Anthology 01	Nov 24, 2009	No	None
"Refugee" (Live)	Tom Petty and the Heartbreakers	2009	Rock	Tom Petty & the Heartbreakers Live Anthology 01	Nov 24, 2009	Yes	None
"Miss Independent"	Kelly Clarkson	2003	Pop/Dance/Electronic	Single	Nov 24, 2009	Yes	None
"Who Knew"	P!nk	2006	Pop-Rock	Single	Nov 24, 2009	Yes	None
"Our Lips Are Sealed"	The Go-Go's	1981	Pop-Rock	Single	Nov 24, 2009	Yes	None
"Come As You Are" (Live from MTV Unplugged)	Nirvana	1994	Grunge	Nirvana 02	Dec 1, 2009	Yes	Pro Guitar/Bass
"Lithium" (Live at Reading)	Nirvana	1991	Grunge	Nirvana 02	Dec 1, 2009	No	Pro Guitar/Bass
"Smells Like Teen Spirit"	Nirvana	1991	Grunge	Nirvana 02	Dec 1, 2009	No	Pro Guitar/Bass
"(You Can Still) Rock in America (Rock Band Re-Record)"	Night Ranger	1983	Rock	Night Ranger 01	Dec 1, 2009	Yes	None
"Don't Tell Me You Love Me (Rock Band Re-Record)"	Night Ranger	1982	Rock	Night Ranger 01	Dec 1, 2009	Yes	None
"You're Gonna Hear From Me"	Night Ranger	2008	Rock	Night Ranger 01	Dec 1, 2009	Yes	None
"Duality"	Slipknot	2004	Nu-Metal	Slipknot 01	Dec 8, 2009	No	None
"Psychosocial"	Slipknot	2008	Nu-Metal	Slipknot 01	Dec 8, 2009	No	None
"Sulfur"	Slipknot	2008	Nu-Metal	Slipknot 01	Dec 8, 2009	No	None
"I Am a Rock"	Simon & Garfunkel	1966	Classic Rock	Single	Dec 8, 2009	Yes	None
"The Sounds of Silence"	Simon & Garfunkel	1966	Classic Rock	Single	Dec 8, 2009	Yes	None
"Dreaming of Love"	Lights Resolve	2009	Indie Rock	Single	Dec 8, 2009	Yes	None
"Christian's Inferno"	Green Day	2009	Rock	Green Day 02	Dec 15, 2009	No	Backing vocals
"Last of the American Girls"	Green Day	2009	Rock	Green Day 02	Dec 15, 2009	Yes	Backing vocals
"¡Viva la Gloria!"	Green Day	2009	Rock	Green Day 02	Dec 15, 2009	Yes	Backing vocals
"Kings and Queens"	30 Seconds to Mars	2009	Emo	Single	Dec 15, 2009	No	None
"This Is War"	30 Seconds to Mars	2009	Emo	Single	Dec 15, 2009	No	None
"Gives You Hell"	All-American Rejects	2008	Emo	Single	Dec 15, 2009	No	None
"(If You're Wondering If I Want You To) I Want You To"	Weezer	2009	Alternative	Weezer 03	Dec 22, 2009	Yes	None
"Beverly Hills"	Weezer	2005	Alternative	Weezer 03	Dec 22, 2009	No	None
"Let It All Hang Out"	Weezer	2009	Alternative	Weezer 03	Dec 22, 2009	No	None
"Build a Bridge"	Limp Bizkit	2003	Nu-Metal	Single	Dec 22, 2009	Yes	None
"A Lot Like Me"	The Offspring	2008	Punk	Single	Dec 22, 2009	Yes	None
"Ocean Avenue"	Yellowcard	2003	Emo	Single	Dec 22, 2009	Yes	None
"Any Man of Mine"	Shania Twain	1995	Country	Going Country 02	Dec 29, 2009	No	None
"Cry Lonely"	Cross Canadian Ragweed	2007	Country	Going Country 02	Dec 29, 2009	No	None
"Good Time"	Alan Jackson	2008	Country	Going Country 02	Dec 29, 2009	No	None
"I Told You So"	Keith Urban	2006	Country	Going Country 02	Dec 29, 2009	No	None
"She's Country"	Jason Aldean	2009	Country	Going Country 02	Dec 29, 2009	No	None
"The Gambler"	Kenny Rogers	1978	Country	Going Country 02	Dec 29, 2009	No	None
"This One's for the Girls"	Martina McBride	2003	Country	Going Country 02	Dec 29, 2009	No	None
"Band on the Run" (Live)	Paul McCartney	2009	Classic Rock	Paul McCartney New York City 01	Jan 5, 2010	Yes	None
"Jet" (Live)	Paul McCartney	2009	Classic Rock	Paul McCartney New York City 01	Jan 5, 2010	Yes	None
"Sing the Changes" (Live)	Paul McCartney	2009	Classic Rock	Paul McCartney New York City 01	Jan 5, 2010	Yes	None
"Adam's Song"	Blink-182	1999	Punk	Blink-182 02	Jan 5, 2010	No	None
"First Date"	Blink-182	2001	Punk	Blink-182 02	Jan 5, 2010	Yes	None
"I Miss You"	Blink-182	2003	Punk	Blink-182 02	Jan 5, 2010	No	None
"Love My Way"	The Psychedelic Furs	1982	New Wave	Single	Jan 5, 2010	Yes	None
"Sister Europe"	The Psychedelic Furs	1980	New Wave	Single	Jan 5, 2010	No	None
"Rock 'n' Roll High School"	Ramones	1978	Punk	Single	Jan 5, 2010	Yes	None
"Grind"	Alice in Chains	1995	Grunge	Alice in Chains 02	Jan 12, 2010	No	None
"Heaven Beside You"	Alice in Chains	1995	Grunge	Alice in Chains 02	Jan 12, 2010	No	None
"Last of My Kind"	Alice in Chains	2009	Grunge	Alice in Chains 02	Jan 12, 2010	No	None
"We Die Young"	Alice in Chains	1990	Grunge	Alice in Chains 02	Jan 12, 2010	No	None
"Your Decision"	Alice in Chains	2009	Grunge	Alice in Chains 02	Jan 12, 2010	No	None
"A Woman in Love (It's Not Me)" (Live)	Tom Petty and the Heartbreakers	2009	Rock	Tom Petty & the Heartbreakers Live Anthology 02	Jan 19, 2010	Yes	None
"Breakdown" (Live)	Tom Petty and the Heartbreakers	2009	Rock	Tom Petty & the Heartbreakers Live Anthology 02	Jan 19, 2010	Yes	None
"Century City" (Live)	Tom Petty and the Heartbreakers	2009	Rock	Tom Petty & the Heartbreakers Live Anthology 02	Jan 19, 2010	Yes	None
"Jammin' Me" (Live)	Tom Petty and the Heartbreakers	2009	Rock	Tom Petty & the Heartbreakers Live Anthology 02	Jan 19, 2010	No	None
"Nightwatchman" (Live)	Tom Petty and the Heartbreakers	2009	Rock	Tom Petty & the Heartbreakers Live Anthology 02	Jan 19, 2010	No	None
"The Waiting" (Live)	Tom Petty and the Heartbreakers	2009	Rock	Tom Petty & the Heartbreakers Live Anthology 02	Jan 19, 2010	Yes	None
"1901"	Phoenix	2009	Alternative	Single	Jan 19, 2010	Yes	None
"Lisztomania"	Phoenix	2009	Alternative	Single	Jan 19, 2010	Yes	None
"Blue Jeans"	Silvertide	2004	Rock	Single	Jan 19, 2010	No	None
"Bulls on Parade"	Rage Against the Machine	1996	Alternative	Single	Jan 26, 2010	No	None
"Hair of the Dog"	Nazareth	1975	Classic Rock	Single	Jan 26, 2010	No	None
"Killed by Death '08"	Motörhead	2008	Metal	Single	Jan 26, 2010	No	None
"Levitate"	I Mother Earth	1993	Alternative	Single	Jan 26, 2010	No	None
"Master of the Universe"	Hawkwind	1971	Rock	Single	Jan 26, 2010	No	None
"Transmaniacon MC"	Blue Öyster Cult	1972	Classic Rock	Single	Jan 26, 2010	No	None
"Godzilla"	Blue Öyster Cult	1977	Classic Rock	Single	Jan 26, 2010	Yes	None
"Gone"	Montgomery Gentry	2004	Country	Going Country 03	Feb 2, 2010	No	None
"Me and My Gang"	Rascal Flatts	2006	Country	Going Country 03	Feb 2, 2010	No	None
"On the Road Again"	Willie Nelson	1980	Country	Going Country 03	Feb 2, 2010	No	None
"She Thinks My Tractor's Sexy"	Kenny Chesney	1999	Country	Going Country 03	Feb 2, 2010	No	None
"Swing"	Trace Adkins	2006	Country	Going Country 03	Feb 2, 2010	No	None
"Suds in the Bucket"	Sara Evans	2003	Country	Going Country 03	Feb 2, 2010	No	None
"The Who Super Bowl S-mashup"	The Who	2010	Classic Rock	Single	Feb 7, 2010	Yes	None
"Holy Wars... The Punishment Due"	Megadeth	1990	Metal	Rust in Peace	Feb 9, 2010	No	None
"Hangar 18"	Megadeth	1990	Metal	Rust in Peace	Feb 9, 2010	Yes	None
"Take No Prisoners"	Megadeth	1990	Metal	Rust in Peace	Feb 9, 2010	No	None
"Five Magics"	Megadeth	1990	Metal	Rust in Peace	Feb 9, 2010	No	None
"Poison Was the Cure"	Megadeth	1990	Metal	Rust in Peace	Feb 9, 2010	No	None
"Lucretia"	Megadeth	1990	Metal	Rust in Peace	Feb 9, 2010	No	None
"Tornado of Souls"	Megadeth	1990	Metal	Rust in Peace	Feb 9, 2010	No	None
"Dawn Patrol"	Megadeth	1990	Metal	Rust in Peace	Feb 9, 2010	Yes	None
"Rust In Peace... Polaris"	Megadeth	1990	Metal	Rust in Peace	Feb 9, 2010	No	None
"(Sittin' on the) Dock of the Bay" (Take 2)	Otis Redding	1967	R&B/Soul/Funk	Otis Redding 01	Feb 16, 2010	Yes	None
"Fa-Fa-Fa-Fa-Fa (Sad Song)"	Otis Redding	1966	R&B/Soul/Funk	Otis Redding 01	Feb 16, 2010	Yes	None
"I'm Sick Y'all"	Otis Redding	1966	R&B/Soul/Funk	Otis Redding 01	Feb 16, 2010	Yes	None
"I've Got Dreams to Remember"	Otis Redding	1968	R&B/Soul/Funk	Otis Redding 01	Feb 16, 2010	Yes	None
"Love Man"	Otis Redding	1969	R&B/Soul/Funk	Otis Redding 01	Feb 16, 2010	No	None
"Weightless"	All Time Low	2009	Emo	Single	Feb 16, 2010	No	None
"Fascination"	Alphabeat	2007	Pop-Rock	Single	Feb 16, 2010	Yes	None
"Stray Cat Strut"	Brian Setzer	1982	Rock	Single	Feb 16, 2010	Yes	None
"Let Forever Be"	The Chemical Brothers	1998	Pop/Dance/Electronic	Single	Feb 16, 2010	Yes	None
"Heartkiller"	HIM	2010	Alternative	HIM 01	Feb 23, 2010	Yes	None
"Ode to Solitude"	HIM	2010	Alternative	HIM 01	Feb 23, 2010	No	None
"Wings of a Butterfly"	HIM	2005	Alternative	HIM 01	Feb 23, 2010	No	None
"Distracted"	KSM	2009	Pop-Rock	Single	Feb 23, 2010	Yes	None
"The Dope Show"	Marilyn Manson	1998	Metal	Single	Feb 23, 2010	No	None
"Just for Tonight"	One Night Only	2008	Pop-Rock	Single	Feb 23, 2010	Yes	None
"Walking on the Moon"	The Police	1979	Rock	Single	Feb 23, 2010	Yes	None
"Meaning of Life"	Disturbed	2000	Nu-Metal	Disturbed 02	Mar 2, 2010	No	None
"The Game"	Disturbed	2000	Nu-Metal	Disturbed 02	Mar 2, 2010	No	None
"Voices"	Disturbed	2000	Nu-Metal	Disturbed 02	Mar 2, 2010	No	None
"Third Floor Story"	The Mother Hips	2009	Rock	Single	Mar 2, 2010	No	None
"White Falcon Fuzz"	The Mother Hips	2009	Rock	Single	Mar 2, 2010	Yes	None
"Panic Switch"	Silversun Pickups	2009	Indie Rock	Single	Mar 2, 2010	No	None
"Sort Of"	Silversun Pickups	2009	Indie Rock	Single	Mar 2, 2010	Yes	None
"Downfall"	TRUSTCompany	2002	Nu-Metal	Single	Mar 2, 2010	Yes	None
"Decent Days and Nights"	The Futureheads	2004	Punk	Single	Mar 9, 2010	Yes	None
"Hounds of Love"	The Futureheads	2004	Punk	Single	Mar 9, 2010	Yes	None
"Walk Away" (Alternate Studio Version)	James Gang	1971	Classic Rock	Single	Mar 9, 2010	Yes	None
"The Hockey Theme"	Neil Peart	2010	Novelty	Single	Mar 9, 2010	Yes	None
"All of This"	Shaimus	2006	Indie Rock	Single	Mar 9, 2010	Yes	None
"Tie You Down"	Shaimus	2008	Indie Rock	Single	Mar 9, 2010	Yes	None
"Fell in Love with a Girl"	The White Stripes	2001	Rock	The White Stripes 02	Mar 9, 2010	Yes	None
"Seven Nation Army"	The White Stripes	2003	Rock	The White Stripes 02	Mar 9, 2010	No	None
"You Don't Know What Love Is (You Just Do as You're Told)"	The White Stripes	2007	Rock	The White Stripes 02	Mar 9, 2010	Yes	None
"Bad Romance"	Lady Gaga	2009	Pop/Dance/Electronic	Lady Gaga 01	Mar 16, 2010	No	None
"Monster"	Lady Gaga	2009	Pop/Dance/Electronic	Lady Gaga 01	Mar 16, 2010	No	None
"Poker Face"	Lady Gaga	2008	Pop/Dance/Electronic	Lady Gaga 01	Mar 16, 2010	No	None
"Just Dance"	Lady Gaga	2008	Pop/Dance/Electronic	Lady Gaga 01	Mar 16, 2010	No	None
"Lady Gaga's Poker Face" (South Park Version)	Eric Cartman	2009	Novelty	Single	Mar 16, 2010	No	None
"It's Not My Time"	3 Doors Down	2008	Rock	Single	Mar 16, 2010	Yes	None
"Control"	Mutemath	2006	Alternative	Single	Mar 16, 2010	Yes	None
"Oh Yeah"	The Subways	2005	Alternative	Single	Mar 16, 2010	No	None
"Rock & Roll Queen"	The Subways	2005	Alternative	Single	Mar 16, 2010	Yes	None
"Blue Spark"	X	1982	Punk	X 01	Mar 23, 2010	Yes	None
"The Hungry Wolf"	X	1982	Punk	X 01	Mar 23, 2010	No	None
"I Must Not Think Bad Thoughts"	X	1983	Punk	X 01	Mar 23, 2010	No	None
"Los Angeles"	X	1980	Punk	X 01	Mar 23, 2010	No	None
"Am I Crazy"	Little Fish	2010	Indie Rock	Single	Mar 23, 2010	Yes	None
"Bang Bang"	Little Fish	2010	Indie Rock	Single	Mar 23, 2010	No	None
"Darling Dear"	Little Fish	2010	Indie Rock	Single	Mar 23, 2010	No	None
"Outer Space"	Ace Frehley	2009	Metal	Single	Mar 23, 2010	No	None
"All-American Girl"	Carrie Underwood	2007	Country	Single	Mar 23, 2010	Yes	None
"Stop & Stare"	OneRepublic	2007	Pop-Rock	Single	Mar 23, 2010	Yes	None
"Up From the Skies"	The Jimi Hendrix Experience	1967	Classic Rock	Axis: Bold as Love	Mar 30, 2010	Yes	None
"Spanish Castle Magic"	The Jimi Hendrix Experience	1967	Classic Rock	Axis: Bold as Love	Mar 30, 2010	Yes	None
"Wait Until Tomorrow"	The Jimi Hendrix Experience	1967	Classic Rock	Axis: Bold as Love	Mar 30, 2010	Yes	None
"Ain't No Telling"	The Jimi Hendrix Experience	1967	Classic Rock	Axis: Bold as Love	Mar 30, 2010	Yes	None
"Little Wing"	The Jimi Hendrix Experience	1967	Classic Rock	Axis: Bold as Love	Mar 30, 2010	Yes	Pro Guitar/Bass
"If 6 Was 9"	The Jimi Hendrix Experience	1967	Classic Rock	Axis: Bold as Love	Mar 30, 2010	Yes	None
"You Got Me Floatin'"	The Jimi Hendrix Experience	1967	Classic Rock	Axis: Bold as Love	Mar 30, 2010	Yes	None
"Castles Made of Sand"	The Jimi Hendrix Experience	1967	Classic Rock	Axis: Bold as Love	Mar 30, 2010	No	None
"She's So Fine"	The Jimi Hendrix Experience	1967	Classic Rock	Axis: Bold as Love	Mar 30, 2010	Yes	None
"One Rainy Wish"	The Jimi Hendrix Experience	1967	Classic Rock	Axis: Bold as Love	Mar 30, 2010	Yes	None
"Little Miss Lover"	The Jimi Hendrix Experience	1967	Classic Rock	Axis: Bold as Love	Mar 30, 2010	No	None
"Bold as Love"	The Jimi Hendrix Experience	1967	Classic Rock	Axis: Bold as Love	Mar 30, 2010	Yes	None
"Valleys of Neptune"	Jimi Hendrix	2010	Classic Rock	Single	Mar 30, 2010	Yes	None
"Feel Good Drag"	Anberlin	2008	Alternative	Single	Apr 6, 2010	No	None
"Live Life Loud"	Hawk Nelson	2009	Pop-Rock	Single	Apr 6, 2010	Yes	None
"Monster"	Skillet	2009	Rock	Single	Apr 6, 2010	Yes	None
"Stand in the Rain"	Superchick	2006	Pop-Rock	Single	Apr 6, 2010	Yes	None
"Meant to Live"	Switchfoot	2003	Alternative	Single	Apr 6, 2010	Yes	None
"Fire It Up"	Thousand Foot Krutch	2009	Nu-Metal	Single	Apr 6, 2010	Yes	None
"Empty Walls"	Serj Tankian	2007	Nu-Metal	Single	Apr 13, 2010	No	None
"Sky Is Over"	Serj Tankian	2007	Nu-Metal	Single	Apr 13, 2010	No	None
"All Star"	Smash Mouth	1999	Pop-Rock	Single	Apr 13, 2010	Yes	None
"Blood on My Hands"	The Used	2009	Emo	The Used 01	Apr 13, 2010	No	None
"Born to Quit"	The Used	2009	Emo	The Used 01	Apr 13, 2010	No	None
"The Taste of Ink"	The Used	2002	Emo	The Used 01	Apr 13, 2010	No	None
"Guns of Summer"	Coheed and Cambria	2010	Prog	Coheed and Cambria 01	Apr 20, 2010	Yes	None
"Here We Are Juggernaut"	Coheed and Cambria	2010	Prog	Coheed and Cambria 01	Apr 20, 2010	No	None
"The Broken"	Coheed and Cambria	2010	Prog	Coheed and Cambria 01	Apr 20, 2010	Yes	None
"Peek-a-Boo"	Siouxsie and The Banshees	1988	Pop-Rock	Single	Apr 20, 2010	No	None
"Sun Hits the Sky"	Supergrass	1997	Alternative	Single	Apr 20, 2010	Yes	None
"American Music"	Violent Femmes	1991	Alternative	Single	Apr 20, 2010	No	None
"Again"	Flyleaf	2009	Nu-Metal	Single	Apr 27, 2010	Yes	None
"Tomorrow"	Silverchair	1995	Alternative	Single	Apr 27, 2010	Yes	None
"Thunderbirds Are Go!"	Busted	2004	Pop-Rock	Single	Apr 27, 2010	Yes	None
"Different People"	No Doubt	1995	Pop-Rock	Tragic Kingdom: The Deep Cuts	May 4, 2010	Yes	None
"End It on This"	No Doubt	1995	Pop-Rock	Tragic Kingdom: The Deep Cuts	May 4, 2010	Yes	None
"Happy Now?"	No Doubt	1995	Pop-Rock	Tragic Kingdom: The Deep Cuts	May 4, 2010	Yes	None
"Hey You"	No Doubt	1995	Pop-Rock	Tragic Kingdom: The Deep Cuts	May 4, 2010	Yes	None
"Sixteen"	No Doubt	1995	Pop-Rock	Tragic Kingdom: The Deep Cuts	May 4, 2010	Yes	None
"The Climb"	No Doubt	1995	Pop-Rock	Tragic Kingdom: The Deep Cuts	May 4, 2010	Yes	None
"Tragic Kingdom"	No Doubt	1995	Pop-Rock	Tragic Kingdom: The Deep Cuts	May 4, 2010	Yes	None
"World Go 'Round"	No Doubt	1995	Pop-Rock	Tragic Kingdom: The Deep Cuts	May 4, 2010	Yes	None
"You Can Do It"	No Doubt	1995	Pop-Rock	Tragic Kingdom: The Deep Cuts	May 4, 2010	No	None
"According to You"	Orianthi	2009	Pop-Rock	Single	May 4, 2010	Yes	None
"Dearest (I'm So Sorry)"	Picture Me Broken	2010	Metal	Single	May 4, 2010	No	None
"Breaking the Law" (Live)	Judas Priest	2010	Metal	British Steel 30th Anniversary	May 11, 2010	Yes	None
"Rapid Fire" (Live)	Judas Priest	2010	Metal	British Steel 30th Anniversary	May 11, 2010	Yes	None
"Metal Gods" (Live)	Judas Priest	2010	Metal	British Steel 30th Anniversary	May 11, 2010	No	None
"Grinder" (Live)	Judas Priest	2010	Metal	British Steel 30th Anniversary	May 11, 2010	Yes	None
"United" (Live)	Judas Priest	2010	Metal	British Steel 30th Anniversary	May 11, 2010	Yes	None
"Living After Midnight" (Live)	Judas Priest	2010	Metal	British Steel 30th Anniversary	May 11, 2010	No	None
"You Don't Have to Be Old to Be Wise" (Live)	Judas Priest	2010	Metal	British Steel 30th Anniversary	May 11, 2010	No	None
"The Rage" (Live)	Judas Priest	2010	Metal	British Steel 30th Anniversary	May 11, 2010	Yes	None
"Steeler" (Live)	Judas Priest	2010	Metal	British Steel 30th Anniversary	May 11, 2010	Yes	None
"Beat It on Down the Line"	Grateful Dead	1967	Classic Rock	Grateful Dead 03	May 18, 2010	Yes	None
"Cumberland Blues"	Grateful Dead	1970	Classic Rock	Grateful Dead 03	May 18, 2010	Yes	None
"Scarlet Begonias"	Grateful Dead	1974	Classic Rock	Grateful Dead 03	May 18, 2010	Yes	None
"Throwing Stones"	Grateful Dead	1987	Classic Rock	Grateful Dead 03	May 18, 2010	No	None
"Touch of Grey"	Grateful Dead	1987	Classic Rock	Grateful Dead 03	May 18, 2010	Yes	None
"U.S. Blues"	Grateful Dead	1974	Classic Rock	Grateful Dead 03	May 18, 2010	Yes	None
"A Girl Like You"	The Smithereens	1989	Rock	Single	May 18, 2010	No	None
"Only a Memory"	The Smithereens	1988	Rock	Single	May 18, 2010	Yes	None
"The Great Southern Trendkill"	Pantera	1996	Metal	The Great Southern Trendkill	May 25, 2010	No	None
"War Nerve"	Pantera	1996	Metal	The Great Southern Trendkill	May 25, 2010	No	None
"Drag the Waters"	Pantera	1996	Metal	The Great Southern Trendkill	May 25, 2010	No	None
"10s"	Pantera	1996	Metal	The Great Southern Trendkill	May 25, 2010	No	None
"13 Steps to Nowhere"	Pantera	1996	Metal	The Great Southern Trendkill	May 25, 2010	No	None
"Suicide Note Pt. II"	Pantera	1996	Metal	The Great Southern Trendkill	May 25, 2010	No	None
"Living Through Me (Hell's Wrath)"	Pantera	1996	Metal	The Great Southern Trendkill	May 25, 2010	No	None
"Floods"	Pantera	1996	Metal	The Great Southern Trendkill	May 25, 2010	No	None
"The Underground in America"	Pantera	1996	Metal	The Great Southern Trendkill	May 25, 2010	No	None
"(Reprise) Sandblasted Skin"	Pantera	1996	Metal	The Great Southern Trendkill	May 25, 2010	No	None
"Alive"	P.O.D.	2001	Nu-Metal	Single	Jun 1, 2010	No	None
"Trouble Comes Running"	Spoon	2010	Indie Rock	Spoon 01	Jun 1, 2010	No	None
"Don't You Evah"	Spoon	2007	Indie Rock	Spoon 01	Jun 1, 2010	No	None
"I Turn My Camera On"	Spoon	2005	Indie Rock	Spoon 01	Jun 1, 2010	No	None
"Got Nuffin"	Spoon	2010	Indie Rock	Spoon 01	Jun 1, 2010	No	None
"Cherry Waves"	Deftones	2006	Nu-Metal	Deftones 01	Jun 8, 2010	No	None
"Hole in the Earth"	Deftones	2006	Nu-Metal	Deftones 01	Jun 8, 2010	No	None
"Minerva"	Deftones	2003	Nu-Metal	Deftones 01	Jun 8, 2010	No	None
"The Great Escape"	Boys Like Girls	2006	Emo	Single	Jun 8, 2010	No	None
"Rock Ready"	Crown of Thorns	2009	Rock	Single	Jun 8, 2010	No	None
"Crazy Babies"	Ozzy Osbourne	1988	Metal	Ozzy Osbourne 01	Jun 15, 2010	Yes	None
"Diggin' Me Down"	Ozzy Osbourne	2010	Metal	Ozzy Osbourne 01	Jun 15, 2010	No	None
"I Don't Wanna Stop"	Ozzy Osbourne	2007	Metal	Ozzy Osbourne 01	Jun 15, 2010	No	None
"Let Me Hear You Scream"	Ozzy Osbourne	2010	Metal	Ozzy Osbourne 01	Jun 15, 2010	No	None
"No More Tears"	Ozzy Osbourne	1991	Metal	Ozzy Osbourne 01	Jun 15, 2010	Yes	None
"Soul Sucker"	Ozzy Osbourne	2010	Metal	Ozzy Osbourne 01	Jun 15, 2010	Yes	None
"Can't Be Tamed"	Miley Cyrus	2010	Pop/Dance/Electronic	Miley Cyrus 01 (Note: Song is available as individual tracks for all consoles but is only available as a pack for the Xbox 360.)	Jun 22, 2010	No	None
"7 Things"	Miley Cyrus	2008	Pop/Dance/Electronic	Miley Cyrus 01	Jun 22, 2010	Yes	None
"Fly on the Wall"	Miley Cyrus	2008	Pop/Dance/Electronic	Miley Cyrus 01	Jun 22, 2010	Yes	None
"See You Again"	Miley Cyrus	2007	Pop/Dance/Electronic	Miley Cyrus 01	Jun 22, 2010	Yes	None
"Start All Over"	Miley Cyrus	2007	Pop/Dance/Electronic	Miley Cyrus 01	Jun 22, 2010	Yes	None
"Burn It to the Ground"	Nickelback	2008	Rock	Nickelback 01	Jun 29, 2010	No	None
"Figured You Out"	Nickelback	2003	Rock	Nickelback 01	Jun 29, 2010	No	None
"Never Again"	Nickelback	2001	Rock	Nickelback 01	Jun 29, 2010	No	None
"Photograph"	Nickelback	2005	Rock	Nickelback 01	Jun 29, 2010	No	None
"Rockstar"	Nickelback	2005	Rock	Nickelback 01	Jun 29, 2010	No	None
"This Afternoon"	Nickelback	2008	Rock	Nickelback 01	Jun 29, 2010	No	None
"Bad Moon Rising"	Creedence Clearwater Revival	1969	Southern Rock	Creedence Clearwater Revival 01	Jul 6, 2010	Yes	Pro Guitar/Bass
"Born on the Bayou"	Creedence Clearwater Revival	1969	Southern Rock	Creedence Clearwater Revival 01	Jul 6, 2010	Yes	None
"Down on the Corner"	Creedence Clearwater Revival	1969	Southern Rock	Creedence Clearwater Revival 01	Jul 6, 2010	Yes	None
"Fortunate Son" (Original Version)	Creedence Clearwater Revival	1969	Southern Rock	Creedence Clearwater Revival 01	Jul 6, 2010	Yes	Pro Guitar/Bass
"Green River"	Creedence Clearwater Revival	1969	Southern Rock	Creedence Clearwater Revival 01	Jul 6, 2010	Yes	None
"I Heard It Through the Grapevine"	Creedence Clearwater Revival	1970	Southern Rock	Creedence Clearwater Revival 01	Jul 6, 2010	Yes	None
"Lookin' Out My Back Door"	Creedence Clearwater Revival	1970	Southern Rock	Creedence Clearwater Revival 01	Jul 6, 2010	Yes	None
"Proud Mary"	Creedence Clearwater Revival	1969	Southern Rock	Creedence Clearwater Revival 01	Jul 6, 2010	Yes	None
"Run Through the Jungle"	Creedence Clearwater Revival	1970	Southern Rock	Creedence Clearwater Revival 01	Jul 6, 2010	No	None
"Travelin' Band"	Creedence Clearwater Revival	1970	Southern Rock	Creedence Clearwater Revival 01	Jul 6, 2010	Yes	None
"Up Around the Bend"	Creedence Clearwater Revival	1970	Southern Rock	Creedence Clearwater Revival 01	Jul 6, 2010	Yes	None
"Who'll Stop the Rain"	Creedence Clearwater Revival	1970	Southern Rock	Creedence Clearwater Revival 01	Jul 6, 2010	Yes	None
"Get Out"	The Vines	2008	Rock	The Vines 01	Jul 13, 2010	No	None
"He's a Rocker"	The Vines	2008	Rock	The Vines 01	Jul 13, 2010	No	None
"Orange Amber"	The Vines	2008	Rock	The Vines 01	Jul 13, 2010	Yes	None
"Outtathaway"	The Vines	2002	Rock	The Vines 01	Jul 13, 2010	Yes	None
"Ride"	The Vines	2004	Rock	The Vines 01	Jul 13, 2010	Yes	None
"Future Perfect Tense"	Sweet Billy Pilgrim	2009	Indie Rock	Single	Jul 13, 2010	Yes	None
"New Dark Ages"	Bad Religion	2007	Punk	Single	Jul 20, 2010	No	None
"No Control"	Bad Religion	1989	Punk	Single	Jul 20, 2010	Yes	None
"1969"	The Stooges	1969	Rock	The Stooges 01	Jul 20, 2010	Yes	None
"I Wanna Be Your Dog"	The Stooges	1969	Rock	The Stooges 01	Jul 20, 2010	Yes	None
"No Fun"	The Stooges	1969	Rock	The Stooges 01	Jul 20, 2010	Yes	None
"A Dios le Pido"	Juanes	2002	Pop-Rock	Juanes 01	Jul 27, 2010	No	None
"Fíjate Bien"	Juanes	2000	Pop-Rock	Juanes 01	Jul 27, 2010	No	None
"Gotas de Agua Dulce"	Juanes	2007	Pop-Rock	Juanes 01	Jul 27, 2010	No	None
"La Camisa Negra"	Juanes	2004	Pop-Rock	Juanes 01	Jul 27, 2010	No	None
"Mala Gente"	Juanes	2002	Pop-Rock	Juanes 01	Jul 27, 2010	No	None
"Yerbatero"	Juanes	2010	Pop-Rock	Juanes 01	Jul 27, 2010	No	None
"Nightmare"	Avenged Sevenfold	2010	Metal	Avenged Sevenfold 01	Jul 27, 2010	No	None
"Seize the Day"	Avenged Sevenfold	2005	Metal	Avenged Sevenfold 01	Jul 27, 2010	No	None
"Scream"	Avenged Sevenfold	2007	Metal	Avenged Sevenfold 01	Jul 27, 2010	No	None
"Rapture"	Blondie	1980	New Wave	Single	Aug 3, 2010	No	None
"Jesus Freak"	DC Talk	1995	Alternative	Single	Aug 3, 2010	No	None
"The Perfect Crime #2"	The Decemberists	2006	Indie Rock	Single	Aug 3, 2010	No	None
"I Only Want You"	Eagles of Death Metal	2004	Rock	Single	Aug 3, 2010	Yes	None
"Saturday Morning"	Eels	2003	Indie Rock	Single	Aug 3, 2010	Yes	None
"Love Addict"	Family Force 5	2006	Rock	Single	Aug 3, 2010	No	None
"Sturm & Drang"	KMFDM	2002	Metal	Single	Aug 3, 2010	No	None
"Bulletproof"	La Roux	2009	Pop/Dance/Electronic	Single	Aug 3, 2010	Yes	None
"Jesus Built My Hotrod"	Ministry	1992	Metal	Ministry 02	Aug 10, 2010	No	None
"Stigmata"	Ministry	1988	Metal	Ministry 02	Aug 10, 2010	No	None
"Thieves"	Ministry	1989	Metal	Ministry 02	Aug 10, 2010	No	None
"Strange Times"	The Black Keys	2008	Rock	The Black Keys 01	Aug 17, 2010	No	None
"I Got Mine"	The Black Keys	2008	Rock	The Black Keys 01	Aug 17, 2010	No	None
"Your Touch"	The Black Keys	2006	Rock	The Black Keys 01	Aug 17, 2010	No	None
"Animal"	Neon Trees	2010	Pop-Rock	Neon Trees 01	Aug 17, 2010	No	None
"Sins of My Youth"	Neon Trees	2010	Pop-Rock	Neon Trees 01	Aug 17, 2010	No	None
"1983"	Neon Trees	2010	Pop-Rock	Neon Trees 01	Aug 17, 2010	No	None
"Asylum"	Disturbed	2010	Nu-Metal	Disturbed 03	Aug 24, 2010	No	None
"The Animal"	Disturbed	2010	Nu-Metal	Disturbed 03	Aug 24, 2010	No	None
"Another Way to Die"	Disturbed	2010	Nu-Metal	Disturbed 03	Aug 24, 2010	No	None
"Mountain Man"	Crash Kings	2009	Rock	Universal Motown Republic Rock 01	Aug 24, 2010	No	None
"Seasons"	The Veer Union	2009	Rock	Universal Motown Republic Rock 01	Aug 24, 2010	Yes	None
"Bury Me Alive"	We Are The Fallen	2010	Metal	Universal Motown Republic Rock 01	Aug 24, 2010	No	None
"What Was I Thinkin'"	Dierks Bentley	2003	Country	Going Country 04	Aug 31, 2010	No	None
"Hell on the Heart"	Eric Church	2009	Country	Going Country 04	Aug 31, 2010	No	None
"Women"	Jamey Johnson	2008	Country	Going Country 04	Aug 31, 2010	No	None
"Would You Go With Me"	Josh Turner	2006	Country	Going Country 04	Aug 31, 2010	No	None
"Days Go By"	Keith Urban	2004	Country	Going Country 04	Aug 31, 2010	No	None
"Lookin' for a Good Time"	Lady Antebellum	2008	Country	Going Country 04	Aug 31, 2010	No	None
"Rebound"	Laura Bell Bundy	2010	Country	Going Country 04	Aug 31, 2010	No	None
"Fancy"	Reba McEntire	1990	Country	Going Country 04	Aug 31, 2010	No	None
"It Happens"	Sugarland	2008	Country	Going Country 04	Aug 31, 2010	No	None
"Rock Band Network Megamix 01" (Note: Song is only available for the Xbox platform.)	Various Artists	2010	Other	Single	Aug 31, 2010	No	None
"Beautiful" (Rock Band Mix)	Snoop Dogg	2010	Hip-Hop/Rap	Snoop Dogg 01	Sep 7, 2010	No	None
"Drop It Like It's Hot" (Rock Band Mix)	Snoop Dogg	2010	Hip-Hop/Rap	Snoop Dogg 01	Sep 7, 2010	No	None
"Ridin' in My Chevy" (Rock Band Mix)	Snoop Dogg	2010	Hip-Hop/Rap	Snoop Dogg 01	Sep 7, 2010	No	None
"Sensual Seduction" (Rock Band Mix)	Snoop Dogg	2010	Hip-Hop/Rap	Snoop Dogg 01	Sep 7, 2010	No	None
"Snoop's Upside Ya Head" (Rock Band Re-Record)	Snoop Dogg	2010	Hip-Hop/Rap	Snoop Dogg 01	Sep 7, 2010	No	None
"Tha Shiznit" (Rock Band Re-Record)	Snoop Dogg	2010	Hip-Hop/Rap	Snoop Dogg 01	Sep 7, 2010	No	None
"That's tha Homie" (Rock Band Mix)	Snoop Dogg	2010	Hip-Hop/Rap	Snoop Dogg 01	Sep 7, 2010	No	None
"Who Am I (What's My Name)?" (Rock Band Re-Record)	Snoop Dogg	2010	Hip-Hop/Rap	Snoop Dogg 01	Sep 7, 2010	No	None
"Holy Diver"	Dio	1983	Metal	Single	Sep 14, 2010	Yes	None
"Stand Up and Shout"	Dio	1983	Metal	Single	Sep 14, 2010	Yes	None
"Nirvana"	Juliana Hatfield	1992	Indie Rock	Single	Sep 14, 2010	No	None
"Irish Blood, English Heart"	Morrissey	2004	Indie Rock	Single	Sep 14, 2010	No	None
"Straight Lines"	Silverchair	2007	Alternative	Single	Sep 14, 2010	No	None
"This Charming Man"	The Smiths	1987	Indie Rock	Single	Sep 14, 2010	Yes	None
"Writing on the Walls"	Underoath	2006	Emo	Single	Sep 14, 2010	No	None
"Is This Love"	Bob Marley and the Wailers	1978	Reggae/Ska	Legend	Sep 21, 2010	Yes	None
"No Woman, No Cry"	Bob Marley and the Wailers	1975	Reggae/Ska	Legend	Sep 21, 2010	Yes	None
"Could You Be Loved"	Bob Marley and the Wailers	1980	Reggae/Ska	Legend	Sep 21, 2010	No	None
"Three Little Birds"	Bob Marley and the Wailers	1977	Reggae/Ska	Legend	Sep 21, 2010	Yes	None
"Buffalo Soldier"	Bob Marley and the Wailers	1983	Reggae/Ska	Legend	Sep 21, 2010	No	None
"Stir It Up"	Bob Marley and the Wailers	1973	Reggae/Ska	Legend	Sep 21, 2010	No	None
"One Love/People Get Ready"	Bob Marley and the Wailers	1977	Reggae/Ska	Legend	Sep 21, 2010	No	None
"I Shot the Sheriff"	Bob Marley and the Wailers	1973	Reggae/Ska	Legend	Sep 21, 2010	No	None
"Waiting in Vain"	Bob Marley and the Wailers	1977	Reggae/Ska	Legend	Sep 21, 2010	Yes	None
"Redemption Song"	Bob Marley and the Wailers	1980	Reggae/Ska	Legend	Sep 21, 2010	No	None
"Satisfy My Soul"	Bob Marley and the Wailers	1978	Reggae/Ska	Legend	Sep 21, 2010	Yes	None
"Exodus"	Bob Marley and the Wailers	1977	Reggae/Ska	Legend	Sep 21, 2010	No	None
"Jamming"	Bob Marley and the Wailers	1977	Reggae/Ska	Legend	Sep 21, 2010	No	None
"Among The Living"	Anthrax	1987	Metal	Anthrax 01	Sep 28, 2010	No	None
"I'm the Man"	Anthrax	1987	Metal	Anthrax 01	Sep 28, 2010	No	None
"Indians"	Anthrax	1987	Metal	Anthrax 01	Sep 28, 2010	Yes	None
"Madhouse" (Live)	Anthrax	1987	Metal	Anthrax 01	Sep 28, 2010	Yes	None
"Metal Thrashing Mad" (Live)	Anthrax	1987	Metal	Anthrax 01	Sep 28, 2010	Yes	None
"I'm Not Okay (I Promise)"	My Chemical Romance	2004	Emo	Single	Sep 28, 2010	No	None
"Welcome to the Black Parade"	My Chemical Romance	2006	Emo	Single	Sep 28, 2010	No	None
"Closer to the Edge"	30 Seconds to Mars	2009	Emo	Single	Sep 28, 2010	Yes	None
"Coffin Nails"	Atreyu	2009	Metal	Single	Sep 28, 2010	No	None
"Out of Line"	Buckcherry	2006	Rock	Single	Sep 28, 2010	No	None
"Listen to the Music"	The Doobie Brothers	1972	Classic Rock	Single	Sep 28, 2010	Yes	None
"Long Train Runnin'"	The Doobie Brothers	1973	Classic Rock	Single	Sep 28, 2010	Yes	None
"Driver 8"	R.E.M.	1985	Alternative	R.E.M. 01	Oct 5, 2010	Yes	None
"It's the End of the World as We Know It"	R.E.M.	1987	Alternative	R.E.M. 01	Oct 5, 2010	Yes	None
"Living Well Is the Best Revenge"	R.E.M.	2008	Alternative	R.E.M. 01	Oct 5, 2010	No	None
"Radio Free Europe"	R.E.M.	1983	Alternative	R.E.M. 01	Oct 5, 2010	Yes	None
"Stand"	R.E.M.	1988	Alternative	R.E.M. 01	Oct 5, 2010	Yes	None
"Superman"	R.E.M.	1986	Alternative	R.E.M. 01	Oct 5, 2010	Yes	None
"These Days"	R.E.M.	1986	Alternative	R.E.M. 01	Oct 5, 2010	Yes	None
"What's the Frequency, Kenneth?"	R.E.M.	1994	Alternative	R.E.M. 01	Oct 5, 2010	No	None
"Children of the Revolution"	T. Rex	1973	Glam	T. Rex 01	Oct 5, 2010	Yes	None
"Cosmic Dancer"	T. Rex	1971	Glam	T. Rex 01	Oct 5, 2010	Yes	None
"Jeepster"	T. Rex	1971	Glam	T. Rex 01	Oct 5, 2010	No	None
"Purple Haze"	The Jimi Hendrix Experience	1967	Classic Rock	Are You Experienced: Rock Band Edition	Oct 12, 2010	Yes	Pro Guitar/Bass
"Manic Depression"	The Jimi Hendrix Experience	1967	Classic Rock	Are You Experienced: Rock Band Edition	Oct 12, 2010	Yes	None
"Hey Joe" (Live)	The Jimi Hendrix Experience	1967	Classic Rock	Are You Experienced: Rock Band Edition	Oct 12, 2010	No	None
"Love or Confusion"	The Jimi Hendrix Experience	1967	Classic Rock	Are You Experienced: Rock Band Edition	Oct 12, 2010	Yes	None
"May This Be Love"	The Jimi Hendrix Experience	1967	Classic Rock	Are You Experienced: Rock Band Edition	Oct 12, 2010	Yes	None
"The Wind Cries Mary"	The Jimi Hendrix Experience	1967	Classic Rock	Are You Experienced: Rock Band Edition	Oct 12, 2010	Yes	None
"Fire" (Live)	Jimi Hendrix	1967	Classic Rock	Are You Experienced: Rock Band Edition	Oct 12, 2010	No	None
"3rd Stone from the Sun"	The Jimi Hendrix Experience	1967	Classic Rock	Are You Experienced: Rock Band Edition	Oct 12, 2010	Yes	None
"Foxey Lady"	The Jimi Hendrix Experience	1967	Classic Rock	Are You Experienced: Rock Band Edition	Oct 12, 2010	Yes	None
"Are You Experienced?"	The Jimi Hendrix Experience	1967	Classic Rock	Are You Experienced: Rock Band Edition	Oct 12, 2010	No	None
"Stone Free"	Jimi Hendrix	2010	Classic Rock	Are You Experienced: Rock Band Edition	Oct 12, 2010	Yes	None
"Highway Chile"	The Jimi Hendrix Experience	1967	Classic Rock	Are You Experienced: Rock Band Edition	Oct 12, 2010	Yes	None
"Big Empty"	Stone Temple Pilots	1994	Alternative	Stone Temple Pilots 01	Oct 19, 2010	No	None
"Crackerman"	Stone Temple Pilots	1992	Alternative	Stone Temple Pilots 01	Oct 19, 2010	No	None
"Creep"	Stone Temple Pilots	1992	Alternative	Stone Temple Pilots 01	Oct 19, 2010	No	None
"Dead & Bloated"	Stone Temple Pilots	1992	Alternative	Stone Temple Pilots 01	Oct 19, 2010	No	None
"Huckleberry Crumble"	Stone Temple Pilots	2010	Alternative	Stone Temple Pilots 01	Oct 19, 2010	No	None
"Trippin' on a Hole in a Paper Heart"	Stone Temple Pilots	1996	Alternative	Stone Temple Pilots 01	Oct 19, 2010	No	None
"Bleed American"	Jimmy Eat World	2001	Pop-Rock	Jimmy Eat World 02	Oct 19, 2010	No	None
"My Best Theory"	Jimmy Eat World	2010	Pop-Rock	Jimmy Eat World 02	Oct 19, 2010	Yes	None
"Pain"	Jimmy Eat World	2004	Pop-Rock	Jimmy Eat World 02	Oct 19, 2010	No	None

=== Playable in Rock Band 3 onwards only ===
Song title	Artist	Year	Genre	Single / Pack name	Release date	Family Friendly	Additional Rock Band 3 Features
"Light My Fire"	The Doors	1967	Classic Rock	The Doors Greatest Hits: Rock Band Edition	Oct 26, 2010	Yes	Core & Pro Guitar/Bass
"Riders on the Storm"	The Doors	1971	Classic Rock	The Doors Greatest Hits: Rock Band Edition	Oct 26, 2010	Yes	Core & Pro Guitar/Bass
"Touch Me"	The Doors	1969	Classic Rock	The Doors Greatest Hits: Rock Band Edition	Oct 26, 2010	Yes	Core & Pro Guitar/Bass
"Hello, I Love You"	The Doors	1968	Classic Rock	The Doors Greatest Hits: Rock Band Edition	Oct 26, 2010	Yes	Core
"L.A. Woman"	The Doors	1971	Classic Rock	The Doors Greatest Hits: Rock Band Edition	Oct 26, 2010	No	Core
"Love Her Madly"	The Doors	1971	Classic Rock	The Doors Greatest Hits: Rock Band Edition	Oct 26, 2010	Yes	Core
"Love Me Two Times"	The Doors	1967	Classic Rock	The Doors Greatest Hits: Rock Band Edition	Oct 26, 2010	No	Core
"Peace Frog"	The Doors	1970	Classic Rock	The Doors Greatest Hits: Rock Band Edition	Oct 26, 2010	No	Core
"People Are Strange"	The Doors	1967	Classic Rock	The Doors Greatest Hits: Rock Band Edition	Oct 26, 2010	Yes	Core
"Roadhouse Blues"	The Doors	1970	Classic Rock	The Doors Greatest Hits: Rock Band Edition	Oct 26, 2010	No	Core
"Soul Kitchen"	The Doors	1967	Classic Rock	The Doors Greatest Hits: Rock Band Edition	Oct 26, 2010	No	Core
"The Crystal Ship"	The Doors	1967	Classic Rock	The Doors Greatest Hits: Rock Band Edition	Oct 26, 2010	Yes	Core
"Subdivisions"	Rush	1982	Prog	Single	Nov 2, 2010	Yes	Core & Pro Guitar/Bass
"Bad Medicine"	Bon Jovi	1988	Rock	Bon Jovi: Greatest Hits: Rock Band Edition	Nov 9, 2010	No	Core
"Blaze of Glory"	Bon Jovi	1990	Rock	Bon Jovi: Greatest Hits: Rock Band Edition	Nov 9, 2010	No	Core
"Have a Nice Day"	Bon Jovi	2005	Rock	Bon Jovi: Greatest Hits: Rock Band Edition	Nov 9, 2010	No	Core
"I'll Be There for You"	Bon Jovi	1988	Rock	Bon Jovi: Greatest Hits: Rock Band Edition	Nov 9, 2010	No	Core
"It's My Life"	Bon Jovi	2000	Rock	Bon Jovi: Greatest Hits: Rock Band Edition	Nov 9, 2010	No	Core
"Lay Your Hands On Me"	Bon Jovi	1988	Rock	Bon Jovi: Greatest Hits: Rock Band Edition	Nov 9, 2010	No	Core
"Livin' on a Prayer" (RB3 Version)	Bon Jovi	1986	Rock	Bon Jovi: Greatest Hits: Rock Band Edition	Nov 9, 2010	No	Core & Pro Guitar/Bass
"Runaway"	Bon Jovi	1984	Rock	Bon Jovi: Greatest Hits: Rock Band Edition	Nov 9, 2010	No	Core & Pro Guitar/Bass
"Wanted Dead or Alive" (RB3 Version)	Bon Jovi	1986	Rock	Bon Jovi: Greatest Hits: Rock Band Edition	Nov 9, 2010	No	Core & Pro Guitar/Bass
"We Weren't Born to Follow"	Bon Jovi	2009	Rock	Bon Jovi: Greatest Hits: Rock Band Edition	Nov 9, 2010	No	Core
"Who Says You Can't Go Home"	Bon Jovi	2005	Rock	Bon Jovi: Greatest Hits: Rock Band Edition	Nov 9, 2010	No	Core
"You Give Love a Bad Name" (RB3 Version)	Bon Jovi	1986	Rock	Bon Jovi: Greatest Hits: Rock Band Edition	Nov 9, 2010	Yes	Core & Pro Guitar/Bass
"Blue Monday"	New Order	1983	New Wave	Single	Nov 9, 2010	No	Core & Pro Guitar/Bass
"Burning Down the House"	Talking Heads	1983	New Wave	Single	Nov 9, 2010	No	Core & Pro Guitar/Bass
"My Own Summer (Shove It)"	Deftones	1997	Nu-Metal	Single	Nov 9, 2010	No	Core & Pro Guitar/Bass
"Jive Talkin'"	Bee Gees	1975	R&B/Soul/Funk	Bee Gees 01	Nov 16, 2010	Yes	Core
"Night Fever"	Bee Gees	1977	R&B/Soul/Funk	Bee Gees 01	Nov 16, 2010	Yes	Core
"Stayin' Alive"	Bee Gees	1977	R&B/Soul/Funk	Bee Gees 01	Nov 16, 2010	Yes	Core & Pro Guitar/Bass
"Nights on Broadway"	Bee Gees	1975	R&B/Soul/Funk	Bee Gees 01	Nov 16, 2010	Yes	Core
"Tragedy"	Bee Gees	1979	R&B/Soul/Funk	Bee Gees 01	Nov 16, 2010	Yes	Core
"You Should Be Dancing"	Bee Gees	1976	R&B/Soul/Funk	Bee Gees 01	Nov 16, 2010	Yes	Core
"The Thrill is Gone"	B.B. King	1969	Blues	Single	Nov 16, 2010	Yes	Core & Pro Guitar/Bass
"A Whiter Shade of Pale"	Procol Harum	1967	Classic Rock	Single	Nov 16, 2010	Yes	Core
"Crippled Inside"	John Lennon	1971	Classic Rock	Imagine	Nov 23, 2010	No	Core
"Jealous Guy"	John Lennon	1971	Classic Rock	Imagine	Nov 23, 2010	No	Core
"It's So Hard"	John Lennon	1971	Classic Rock	Imagine	Nov 23, 2010	No	Core
"I Don't Wanna Be a Soldier Mama"	John Lennon	1971	Classic Rock	Imagine	Nov 23, 2010	No	Core
"Gimme Some Truth"	John Lennon	1971	Classic Rock	Imagine	Nov 23, 2010	No	Core
"Oh My Love"	John Lennon	1971	Classic Rock	Imagine	Nov 23, 2010	No	Core
"How Do You Sleep?"	John Lennon	1971	Classic Rock	Imagine	Nov 23, 2010	No	Core & Pro Guitar/Bass
"How?"	John Lennon	1971	Classic Rock	Imagine	Nov 23, 2010	No	Core
"Oh Yoko!"	John Lennon	1971	Classic Rock	Imagine	Nov 23, 2010	No	Core
"Hold On Loosely"	38 Special	1981	Southern Rock	Single	Nov 30, 2010	No	Core & Pro Guitar/Bass
"Can't Get Enough"	Bad Company	1974	Classic Rock	Single	Nov 30, 2010	No	Core & Pro Guitar/Bass
"Saturday Night Special"	Lynyrd Skynyrd	1975	Southern Rock	Lynyrd Skynyrd 01	Nov 30, 2010	No	Core & Pro Guitar/Bass
"Sweet Home Alabama" (Live)	Lynyrd Skynyrd	1976	Southern Rock	Lynyrd Skynyrd 01	Nov 30, 2010	No	Core & Pro Guitar/Bass
"Tuesday's Gone"	Lynyrd Skynyrd	1973	Southern Rock	Lynyrd Skynyrd 01	Nov 30, 2010	No	Core
"What's Your Name?"	Lynyrd Skynyrd	1977	Southern Rock	Lynyrd Skynyrd 01	Nov 30, 2010	No	Core & Pro Guitar/Bass
"Hammer to Fall"	Queen	1984	Classic Rock	Queen Extravaganza 01	Dec 7, 2010	No	Core & Pro Guitar/Bass
"Keep Yourself Alive"	Queen	1973	Classic Rock	Queen Extravaganza 01	Dec 7, 2010	Yes	Core & Pro Guitar/Bass
"Now I'm Here"	Queen	1974	Classic Rock	Queen Extravaganza 01	Dec 7, 2010	Yes	Core & Pro Guitar/Bass
"Play the Game"	Queen	1980	Classic Rock	Queen Extravaganza 01	Dec 7, 2010	No	Core & Pro Guitar/Bass
"Tenement Funster"	Queen	1974	Classic Rock	Queen Extravaganza 01	Dec 7, 2010	No	Core & Pro Guitar/Bass
"We Are the Champions" (RB3 Version)	Queen	1977	Classic Rock	Queen Extravaganza 01	Dec 7, 2010	Yes	Core & Pro Guitar/Bass
"We Will Rock You" (RB3 Version)	Queen	1977	Classic Rock	Queen Extravaganza 01	Dec 7, 2010	Yes	Core & Pro Guitar/Bass
"I Want It All" (RB3 Version)	Queen	1989	Classic Rock	Queen RB3 Enhanced Pack	Dec 7, 2010	Yes	Core & Pro Guitar/Bass
"I Want To Break Free" (RB3 Version)	Queen	1984	Classic Rock	Queen RB3 Enhanced Pack	Dec 7, 2010	No	Core & Pro Guitar/Bass
"Killer Queen" (RB3 Version)	Queen	1974	Classic Rock	Queen RB3 Enhanced Pack	Dec 7, 2010	No	Core & Pro Guitar/Bass
"One Vision" (RB3 Version)	Queen	1986	Classic Rock	Queen RB3 Enhanced Pack	Dec 7, 2010	No	Core & Pro Guitar/Bass
"Somebody to Love" (RB3 Version)	Queen	1976	Classic Rock	Queen RB3 Enhanced Pack	Dec 7, 2010	No	Core & Pro Guitar/Bass
"Under Pressure" (RB3 Version)	Queen	1982	Classic Rock	Queen RB3 Enhanced Pack	Dec 7, 2010	Yes	Core & Pro Guitar/Bass
"Big Shot"	Billy Joel	1978	Classic Rock	Billy Joel: The Hits: Rock Band Edition	Dec 14, 2010	No	Core & Pro Guitar/Bass
"Captain Jack"	Billy Joel	1973	Classic Rock	Billy Joel: The Hits: Rock Band Edition	Dec 14, 2010	No	Core
"It's Still Rock and Roll to Me"	Billy Joel	1980	Classic Rock	Billy Joel: The Hits: Rock Band Edition	Dec 14, 2010	Yes	Core
"Movin' Out (Anthony's Song)"	Billy Joel	1977	Classic Rock	Billy Joel: The Hits: Rock Band Edition	Dec 14, 2010	Yes	Core & Pro Guitar/Bass
"Only the Good Die Young"	Billy Joel	1977	Classic Rock	Billy Joel: The Hits: Rock Band Edition	Dec 14, 2010	No	Core & Pro Guitar/Bass
"Piano Man"	Billy Joel	1973	Classic Rock	Billy Joel: The Hits: Rock Band Edition	Dec 14, 2010	No	Core
"Pressure"	Billy Joel	1982	Classic Rock	Billy Joel: The Hits: Rock Band Edition	Dec 14, 2010	Yes	Core
"Say Goodbye to Hollywood"	Billy Joel	1976	Classic Rock	Billy Joel: The Hits: Rock Band Edition	Dec 14, 2010	Yes	Core
"The Entertainer"	Billy Joel	1974	Classic Rock	Billy Joel: The Hits: Rock Band Edition	Dec 14, 2010	No	Core
"The Stranger"	Billy Joel	1977	Classic Rock	Billy Joel: The Hits: Rock Band Edition	Dec 14, 2010	Yes	Core
"We Didn't Start the Fire"	Billy Joel	1989	Classic Rock	Billy Joel: The Hits: Rock Band Edition	Dec 14, 2010	No	Core
"You May Be Right"	Billy Joel	1980	Classic Rock	Billy Joel: The Hits: Rock Band Edition	Dec 14, 2010	Yes	Core
"Happy Xmas (War Is Over)"	John & Yoko, The Plastic Ono Band	1971	Classic Rock	Single	Dec 21, 2010	No	Core
"Peut-Être une Angine"	Anaïs	2008	Pop-Rock	Single	Dec 21, 2010	No	Core
"Dis-Moi"	BB Brunes	2007	Pop-Rock	Single	Dec 21, 2010	No	Core & Pro Guitar/Bass
"Verdamp Lang Her"	BAP	1981	Rock	Single	Dec 21, 2010	No	Core
"Nur ein Wort"	Wir sind Helden	2005	Pop-Rock	Single	Dec 21, 2010	No	Core
"Fantasma"	Linea 77	2003	Nu-Metal	Single	Dec 21, 2010	No	Core
"Proibito"	Litfiba	1990	Rock	Single	Dec 21, 2010	No	Core
"Starting to Appreciate"	Tutankamon	2010	Indie Rock	Single	Dec 21, 2010	No	Core
"Dame Aire"	Skizoo	2007	Metal	Single	Dec 21, 2010	No	Core
"Jerk It Out"	Caesars	2003	Indie Rock	Single	Dec 21, 2010	No	Core & Pro Guitar/Bass
"Maybe I'm Amazed"	Paul McCartney	1970	Classic Rock	Celebrating Band on the Run	Dec 28, 2010	Yes	Core
"Band on the Run"	Paul McCartney & Wings	1973	Classic Rock	Celebrating Band on the Run	Dec 28, 2010	Yes	Core
"Helen Wheels"	Paul McCartney & Wings	1973	Classic Rock	Celebrating Band on the Run	Dec 28, 2010	No	Core
"Let Me Roll It"	Paul McCartney & Wings	1973	Classic Rock	Celebrating Band on the Run	Dec 28, 2010	No	Core & Pro Guitar/Bass
"Open My Eyes"	Inhabited	2005	Pop-Rock	Single	Dec 28, 2010	Yes	Core
"Cities in Dust"	Siouxsie and The Banshees	1986	Pop-Rock	Single	Dec 28, 2010	Yes	Core & Pro Guitar/Bass
"Cry, Cry, Cry"	Johnny Cash	1955	Country	Johnny Cash 01	Jan 4, 2011	Yes	Core
"Don't Take Your Guns to Town"	Johnny Cash	1958	Country	Johnny Cash 01	Jan 4, 2011	No	Core
"Five Feet High and Rising"	Johnny Cash	1959	Country	Johnny Cash 01	Jan 4, 2011	Yes	Core
"Folsom Prison Blues"	Johnny Cash	1955	Country	Johnny Cash 01	Jan 4, 2011	No	Core
"I Got Stripes"	Johnny Cash	1959	Country	Johnny Cash 01	Jan 4, 2011	Yes	Core
"I Walk the Line"	Johnny Cash	1956	Country	Johnny Cash 01	Jan 4, 2011	Yes	Core & Pro Guitar/Bass
"Tennessee Flat Top Box"	Johnny Cash	1961	Country	Johnny Cash 01	Jan 4, 2011	Yes	Core & Pro Guitar/Bass
"The Ballad of Ira Hayes"	Johnny Cash	1964	Country	Johnny Cash 01	Jan 4, 2011	No	Core
"Visions" (Note: Song is only available in a pack and cannot be downloaded individually.)	Abnormality	2007	Metal	Rock Band Free 01	Jan 4, 2011	No	None
"Get Clean"	Anarchy Club	2009	Metal	Rock Band Free 01	Jan 4, 2011	No	None
"Night Lies"	Bang Camaro	2008	Rock	Rock Band Free 01	Jan 4, 2011	No	None
"Shoulder to the Plow"	Breaking Wheel	2008	Metal	Rock Band Free 01	Jan 4, 2011	No	None
"Welcome to the Neighborhood"	Libyans	2008	Punk	Rock Band Free 01	Jan 4, 2011	No	None
"A Jagged Gorgeous Winter"	The Main Drag	2008	Indie Rock	Rock Band Free 01	Jan 4, 2011	No	None
"Conventional Lover"	Speck	2007	Pop-Rock	Rock Band Free 01	Jan 4, 2011	No	None
"Supreme Girl"	The Sterns	2006	Pop-Rock	Rock Band Free 01	Jan 4, 2011	No	None
"Rob the Prez-O-Dent"	That Handsome Devil	2008	Rock	Rock Band Free 01	Jan 4, 2011	No	None
"Crawling"	Linkin Park	2000	Nu-Metal	Linkin Park 01	Jan 11, 2011	No	Core
"In the End"	Linkin Park	2000	Nu-Metal	Linkin Park 01	Jan 11, 2011	No	Core & Pro Guitar/Bass
"Numb"	Linkin Park	2003	Nu-Metal	Linkin Park 01	Jan 11, 2011	No	Core
"Somewhere I Belong"	Linkin Park	2003	Nu-Metal	Linkin Park 01	Jan 11, 2011	No	Core
"Waiting for the End"	Linkin Park	2010	Nu-Metal	Linkin Park 01	Jan 11, 2011	No	Core
"What I've Done"	Linkin Park	2007	Nu-Metal	Linkin Park 01	Jan 11, 2011	No	Core & Pro Guitar/Bass
"Made of Scars"	Stone Sour	2006	Metal	Stone Sour 01	Jan 18, 2011	Yes	Core
"Say You'll Haunt Me"	Stone Sour	2010	Metal	Stone Sour 01	Jan 18, 2011	Yes	Core & Pro Guitar/Bass
"Through Glass"	Stone Sour	2006	Metal	Stone Sour 01	Jan 18, 2011	Yes	Core
"Blue Jean"	David Bowie	1984	Glam	David Bowie 02	Jan 25, 2011	Yes	Core
"Fame"	David Bowie	1975	Glam	David Bowie 02	Jan 25, 2011	Yes	Core
"Modern Love"	David Bowie	1983	Glam	David Bowie 02	Jan 25, 2011	Yes	Core & Pro Guitar/Bass
"Young Americans"	David Bowie	1975	Glam	David Bowie 02	Jan 25, 2011	No	Core
"Ziggy Stardust"	David Bowie	1972	Glam	David Bowie 02	Jan 25, 2011	No	Core & Pro Guitar/Bass
"Freakshow" (Note: Song is only available through codes found on packages of Schick razors and is not available through the Music Store or console marketplaces.) (Note: Song is an updated version of a song previously released through the Rock Band Network.) (Note: Song includes Pro Guitar and Bass charts in the base price; the charts do not need to be purchased separately.)	HourCast	2010	Rock	Schick Promo Pack	Feb 1, 2011	Yes	Core & Pro Guitar/Bass
"Don't Feel Like That Anymore"	Johnny Cooper	2009	Rock	Schick Promo Pack	Feb 1, 2011	Yes	Core & Pro Guitar/Bass
"Appetite"	The Gracious Few	2010	Rock	Schick Promo Pack	Feb 1, 2011	No	Core & Pro Guitar/Bass
"London Calling"	The Clash	1979	Punk	London Calling	Feb 1, 2011	No	Core & Pro Guitar/Bass
"Brand New Cadillac"	The Clash	1979	Punk	London Calling	Feb 1, 2011	No	Core
"Jimmy Jazz"	The Clash	1979	Punk	London Calling	Feb 1, 2011	No	Core
"Hateful"	The Clash	1979	Punk	London Calling	Feb 1, 2011	No	Core
"Rudie Can't Fail"	The Clash	1979	Punk	London Calling	Feb 1, 2011	No	Core & Pro Guitar/Bass
"Spanish Bombs"	The Clash	1979	Punk	London Calling	Feb 1, 2011	No	Core & Pro Guitar/Bass
"The Right Profile"	The Clash	1979	Punk	London Calling	Feb 1, 2011	No	Core
"Lost in the Supermarket"	The Clash	1979	Punk	London Calling	Feb 1, 2011	No	Core
"Clampdown"	The Clash	1979	Punk	London Calling	Feb 1, 2011	No	Core & Pro Guitar/Bass
"The Guns of Brixton"	The Clash	1979	Punk	London Calling	Feb 1, 2011	No	Core
"Wrong 'Em Boyo"	The Clash	1979	Punk	London Calling	Feb 1, 2011	No	Core
"Death or Glory"	The Clash	1979	Punk	London Calling	Feb 1, 2011	No	Core
"Koka Kola"	The Clash	1979	Punk	London Calling	Feb 1, 2011	No	Core
"The Card Cheat"	The Clash	1979	Punk	London Calling	Feb 1, 2011	No	Core & Pro Guitar/Bass
"Lover's Rock"	The Clash	1979	Punk	London Calling	Feb 1, 2011	No	Core
"Four Horsemen"	The Clash	1979	Punk	London Calling	Feb 1, 2011	No	Core
"I'm Not Down"	The Clash	1979	Punk	London Calling	Feb 1, 2011	No	Core
"Revolution Rock"	The Clash	1979	Punk	London Calling	Feb 1, 2011	No	Core
"Bend Down Low"	Bob Marley and the Wailers	1974	Reggae/Ska	Bob Marley 01	Feb 8, 2011	Yes	Core
"Burnin' and Lootin'"	Bob Marley and the Wailers	1973	Reggae/Ska	Bob Marley 01	Feb 8, 2011	No	Core
"Coming in from the Cold"	Bob Marley and the Wailers	1980	Reggae/Ska	Bob Marley 01	Feb 8, 2011	Yes	Core
"Kaya"	Bob Marley and the Wailers	1978	Reggae/Ska	Bob Marley 01	Feb 8, 2011	No	Core
"Lively Up Yourself"	Bob Marley and the Wailers	1974	Reggae/Ska	Bob Marley 01	Feb 8, 2011	Yes	Core
"No More Trouble"	Bob Marley and the Wailers	1973	Reggae/Ska	Bob Marley 01	Feb 8, 2011	Yes	Core
"Small Axe"	Bob Marley and the Wailers	1973	Reggae/Ska	Bob Marley 01	Feb 8, 2011	Yes	Core
"Them Belly Full (But We Hungry)"	Bob Marley and the Wailers	1974	Reggae/Ska	Bob Marley 01	Feb 8, 2011	Yes	Core & Pro Guitar/Bass
"Obsession"	Animotion	1984	New Wave	February Heartache Duets' Pack	Feb 11, 2011	No	Core
"Airplanes"	B.o.B (featuring Hayley Williams)	2010	Hip-Hop/Rap	February Heartache Duets' Pack	Feb 11, 2011	Yes	Core
"Total Eclipse of the Heart"	Bonnie Tyler	1983	Pop-Rock	February Heartache Duets' Pack	Feb 11, 2011	Yes	Core
"Don't You Want Me"	The Human League	1981	Pop/Dance/Electronic	February Heartache Duets' Pack	Feb 11, 2011	Yes	Core
"Need You Now"	Lady Antebellum	2010	Country	February Heartache Duets' Pack	Feb 11, 2011	No	Core
"Paradise by the Dashboard Light"	Meat Loaf	1977	Classic Rock	February Heartache Duets' Pack	Feb 11, 2011	No	Core
"Stop Draggin' My Heart Around"	Stevie Nicks	1981	Classic Rock	February Heartache Duets' Pack	Feb 11, 2011	Yes	Core & Pro Guitar/Bass
"Fire and Ice"	Pat Benatar	1981	Classic Rock	Pat Benatar 01	Feb 22, 2011	Yes	Core
"Love is a Battlefield"	Pat Benatar	1983	Classic Rock	Pat Benatar 01	Feb 22, 2011	Yes	Core
"Shadows of the Night"	Pat Benatar	1982	Classic Rock	Pat Benatar 01	Feb 22, 2011	Yes	Core
"We Belong"	Pat Benatar	1984	Classic Rock	Pat Benatar 01	Feb 22, 2011	Yes	Core & Pro Guitar/Bass
"Invincible"	Pat Benatar	1985	Classic Rock	Pat Benatar 01	Feb 22, 2011	Yes	Core
"Promises in the Dark"	Pat Benatar	1981	Classic Rock	Pat Benatar 01	Feb 22, 2011	Yes	Core
"Terrible Lie"	Nine Inch Nails	1989	Rock	Pretty Hate Pack 01	Mar 1, 2011	No	Core
"Head Like a Hole"	Nine Inch Nails	1989	Rock	Pretty Hate Pack 01	Mar 1, 2011	No	Core & Pro Guitar/Bass
"Sanctified"	Nine Inch Nails	1989	Rock	Pretty Hate Pack 01	Mar 1, 2011	No	Core
"The Only Time"	Nine Inch Nails	1989	Rock	Pretty Hate Pack 01	Mar 1, 2011	No	Core
"Never Let Me Down Again"	Depeche Mode	1987	Pop/Dance/Electronic	Depeche Mode 01	Mar 8, 2011	Yes	Core
"Personal Jesus"	Depeche Mode	1990	Pop/Dance/Electronic	Depeche Mode 01	Mar 8, 2011	No	Core & Pro Guitar/Bass
"Policy of Truth"	Depeche Mode	1990	Pop/Dance/Electronic	Depeche Mode 01	Mar 8, 2011	Yes	Core
"I Will Possess Your Heart"	Death Cab for Cutie	2008	Indie Rock	Single	Mar 8, 2011	Yes	Core
"Shooting the Moon"	OK Go	2010	Pop-Rock	Single	Mar 15, 2011	Yes	Core
"Every Breath You Take"	The Police	1983	Rock	Single	Mar 15, 2011	Yes	Core & Pro Guitar/Bass
"So Lonely"	The Police	1978	Rock	Single	Mar 15, 2011	Yes	Core
"Spill the Wine"	WAR	1970	R&B/Soul/Funk	Single	Mar 15, 2011	No	Core
"I Go to Extremes"	Billy Joel	1989	Classic Rock	Billy Joel Piano Challenge	Mar 22, 2011	Yes	Core
"Miami 2017 (Seen the Lights Go Out on Broadway)"	Billy Joel	1976	Classic Rock	Billy Joel Piano Challenge	Mar 22, 2011	No	Core
"My Life"	Billy Joel	1978	Classic Rock	Billy Joel Piano Challenge	Mar 22, 2011	Yes	Core
"Prelude/Angry Young Man"	Billy Joel	1976	Classic Rock	Billy Joel Piano Challenge	Mar 22, 2011	No	Core & Pro Guitar/Bass
"Scenes from an Italian Restaurant"	Billy Joel	1977	Classic Rock	Billy Joel Piano Challenge	Mar 22, 2011	No	Core
"She's Always a Woman"	Billy Joel	1977	Classic Rock	Billy Joel Piano Challenge	Mar 22, 2011	Yes	Core
"Somebody to Love"	Jefferson Airplane	1967	Classic Rock	Days of Peace 01	Mar 29, 2011	No	Core
"Spinning Wheel"	Blood, Sweat & Tears	1968	Classic Rock	Days of Peace 01	Mar 29, 2011	Yes	Core
"Black Magic Woman"	Santana	1970	Classic Rock	Days of Peace 01	Mar 29, 2011	No	Core & Pro Guitar/Bass
"Through the Fire and Flames"	DragonForce	2006	Metal	Single	Mar 29, 2011	No	Core & Pro Guitar/Bass
"Operation Ground and Pound"	DragonForce	2006	Metal	Single	Mar 29, 2011	No	Core
"The Loco-Motion"	Grand Funk Railroad	1974	Classic Rock	Single	Apr 5, 2011	Yes	Core
"We're an American Band"	Grand Funk Railroad	1973	Classic Rock	Single	Apr 5, 2011	No	Core & Pro Guitar/Bass
"Freeze-Frame"	The J. Geils Band	1981	Rock	Single	Apr 5, 2011	Yes	Core & Pro Guitar/Bass
"Love Will Tear Us Apart"	Joy Division	1980	New Wave	Single	Apr 5, 2011	Yes	Core & Pro Guitar/Bass
"Dreams"	Fleetwood Mac	1977	Classic Rock	Fleetwood Mac/Stevie Nicks 01	Apr 12, 2011	Yes	Core & Pro Guitar/Bass
"Gold Dust Woman"	Fleetwood Mac	1977	Classic Rock	Fleetwood Mac/Stevie Nicks 01	Apr 12, 2011	Yes	Core
"Landslide"	Fleetwood Mac	1975	Classic Rock	Fleetwood Mac/Stevie Nicks 01	Apr 12, 2011	Yes	Core
"Rhiannon"	Fleetwood Mac	1975	Classic Rock	Fleetwood Mac/Stevie Nicks 01	Apr 12, 2011	Yes	Core
"Edge of Seventeen (Just Like the White Winged Dove)"	Stevie Nicks	1981	Classic Rock	Fleetwood Mac/Stevie Nicks 01	Apr 12, 2011	Yes	Core & Pro Guitar/Bass
"Stand Back"	Stevie Nicks	1983	Classic Rock	Fleetwood Mac/Stevie Nicks 01	Apr 12, 2011	Yes	Core
"Breaking"	Anberlin	2008	Alternative	Single	Apr 19, 2011	Yes	Core
"Blood and Thunder"	Mastodon	2004	Metal	Single	Apr 19, 2011	No	Core & Pro Guitar/Bass
"Fire"	Ohio Players	1974	R&B/Soul/Funk	Single	Apr 19, 2011	No	Core
"Love Rollercoaster"	Ohio Players	1975	R&B/Soul/Funk	Single	Apr 19, 2011	Yes	Core & Pro Guitar/Bass
"Must Have Done Something Right"	Relient K	2007	Pop-Rock	Single	Apr 19, 2011	Yes	Core
"867-5309/Jenny"	Tommy Tutone	1981	Rock	Single	Apr 19, 2011	Yes	Core & Pro Guitar/Bass
"Blue Bayou"	Roy Orbison	1963	Classic Rock	Roy Orbison: 75th Birthday Pack	Apr 26, 2011	Yes	Core
"Dream Baby (How Long Must I Dream)"	Roy Orbison	1962	Classic Rock	Roy Orbison: 75th Birthday Pack	Apr 26, 2011	Yes	Core
"Only the Lonely (Know the Way I Feel)"	Roy Orbison	1960	Classic Rock	Roy Orbison: 75th Birthday Pack	Apr 26, 2011	Yes	Core & Pro Guitar/Bass
"Rock and Roll All Nite" (Live)	Kiss	1975	Classic Rock	Single	Apr 26, 2011	Yes	Core & Pro Guitar/Bass
"Strutter" (Live)	Kiss	1975	Classic Rock	Single	Apr 26, 2011	Yes	Core
"Do You Really Want to Hurt Me"	Culture Club	1982	New Wave	Single	May 3, 2011	Yes	Core
"From Out of Nowhere"	Faith No More	1989	Rock	Single	May 3, 2011	Yes	Core
"Working for the Weekend"	Loverboy	1981	Pop-Rock	Single	May 3, 2011	Yes	Core & Pro Guitar/Bass
"Stash"	Phish	1992	Rock	Single	May 3, 2011	No	Core & Pro Guitar/Bass
"Tweezer"	Phish	1992	Rock	Single	May 3, 2011	No	Core
"Big Bang Baby"	Stone Temple Pilots	1996	Alternative	Single	May 3, 2011	Yes	Core & Pro Guitar/Bass
"Long Road to Ruin"	Foo Fighters	2007	Alternative	Foo Fighters 04	May 10, 2011	No	Core
"Rope"	Foo Fighters	2011	Alternative	Foo Fighters 04	May 10, 2011	Yes	Core & Pro Guitar/Bass
"Stacked Actors"	Foo Fighters	1999	Alternative	Foo Fighters 04	May 10, 2011	No	Core
"Walk"	Foo Fighters	2011	Alternative	Foo Fighters 04	May 10, 2011	Yes	Core
"Hard Rock Hallelujah"	Lordi	2006	Metal	Single	May 10, 2011	No	Core
"King of Rock"	Run-DMC	1985	Hip-Hop/Rap	Single	May 10, 2011	No	Core
"5 Minutes Alone"	Pantera	1994	Metal	Pantera 01	May 19, 2011	No	Core & Pro Guitar/Bass
"Walk"	Pantera	1992	Metal	Pantera 01	May 19, 2011	No	Core & Pro Guitar/Bass
"Mouth for War"	Pantera	1992	Metal	Pantera 01	May 19, 2011	No	Core
"I'm Broken"	Pantera	1994	Metal	Pantera 01	May 19, 2011	No	Core
"Do You Feel Like We Do" (Live)	Peter Frampton	1976	Rock	Single	May 19, 2011	No	Core
"Born This Way"	Lady Gaga	2011	Pop/Dance/Electronic	Lady Gaga 02	May 23, 2011	No	Core
"LoveGame"	Lady Gaga	2008	Pop/Dance/Electronic	Lady Gaga 02	May 23, 2011	No	Core
"Paparazzi"	Lady Gaga	2008	Pop/Dance/Electronic	Lady Gaga 02	May 23, 2011	No	Core
"Hot Blooded"	Foreigner	1978	Classic Rock	Single	May 23, 2011	No	Core & Pro Guitar/Bass
"Urgent"	Foreigner	1981	Classic Rock	Single	May 23, 2011	Yes	Core & Pro Guitar/Bass
"Mr. Crowley"	Ozzy Osbourne	1980	Metal	Ozzy Osbourne 8-Pack	May 31, 2011	No	Core & Pro Guitar/Bass
"Over the Mountain"	Ozzy Osbourne	1981	Metal	Ozzy Osbourne 8-Pack	May 31, 2011	Yes	Core
"Bark at the Moon"	Ozzy Osbourne	1983	Metal	Ozzy Osbourne 8-Pack	May 31, 2011	No	Core & Pro Guitar/Bass
"Mama, I'm Coming Home"	Ozzy Osbourne	1991	Metal	Ozzy Osbourne 8-Pack	May 31, 2011	Yes	Core & Pro Guitar/Bass
"Steal Away (The Night)"	Ozzy Osbourne	1980	Metal	Ozzy Osbourne 8-Pack	May 31, 2011	No	Core
"Flying High Again"	Ozzy Osbourne	1981	Metal	Ozzy Osbourne 8-Pack	May 31, 2011	Yes	Core
"Diary of a Madman"	Ozzy Osbourne	1981	Metal	Ozzy Osbourne 8-Pack	May 31, 2011	No	Core
"I Don't Know"	Ozzy Osbourne	1980	Metal	Ozzy Osbourne 8-Pack	May 31, 2011	Yes	Core
"Grenade"	Bruno Mars	2010	Pop-Rock	Bruno Mars 01	Jun 7, 2011	No	Core
"Just the Way You Are"	Bruno Mars	2010	Pop-Rock	Bruno Mars 01	Jun 7, 2011	Yes	Core
"Marry You"	Bruno Mars	2010	Pop-Rock	Bruno Mars 01	Jun 7, 2011	No	Core
"Audience of One"	Rise Against	2008	Punk	Rise Against 02	Jun 7, 2011	Yes	Core & Pro Guitar/Bass
"Help Is on the Way"	Rise Against	2011	Punk	Rise Against 02	Jun 7, 2011	Yes	Core
"The Good Left Undone"	Rise Against	2006	Punk	Rise Against 02	Jun 7, 2011	Yes	Core & Pro Guitar/Bass
"Take On Me"	a-ha	1985	New Wave	Single	Jun 14, 2011	Yes	Core & Pro Guitar/Bass
"Unholy Confessions"	Avenged Sevenfold	2003	Metal	Single	Jun 14, 2011	No	Core & Pro Guitar/Bass
"Welcome to the Family"	Avenged Sevenfold	2010	Metal	Single	Jun 14, 2011	No	Core
"Tubthumping"	Chumbawamba	1997	Pop-Rock	Single	Jun 14, 2011	No	Core
"I Alone"	Live	1994	Alternative	Single	Jun 14, 2011	No	Core & Pro Guitar/Bass
"Lightning Crashes"	Live	1994	Alternative	Single	Jun 14, 2011	No	Core
"Misery"	Maroon 5	2010	Pop-Rock	Maroon 5 02	Jun 21, 2011	No	Core
"This Love"	Maroon 5	2002	Pop-Rock	Maroon 5 02	Jun 21, 2011	No	Core & Pro Guitar/Bass
"Won't Go Home Without You"	Maroon 5	2007	Pop-Rock	Maroon 5 02	Jun 21, 2011	Yes	Core
"Blurry"	Puddle of Mudd	2001	Alternative	Puddle of Mudd 01	Jun 21, 2011	No	Core
"Control"	Puddle of Mudd	2001	Alternative	Puddle of Mudd 01	Jun 21, 2011	No	Core
"She Hates Me"	Puddle of Mudd	2001	Alternative	Puddle of Mudd 01	Jun 21, 2011	No	Core & Pro Guitar/Bass
"Here Without You"	3 Doors Down	2002	Rock	3 Doors Down 01	Jun 28, 2011	Yes	Core
"When I'm Gone"	3 Doors Down	2002	Rock	3 Doors Down 01	Jun 28, 2011	No	Core & Pro Guitar/Bass
"When You're Young"	3 Doors Down	2011	Rock	3 Doors Down 01	Jun 28, 2011	Yes	Core
"Nothin' but a Good Time"	Poison	1988	Glam	Poison 01	Jun 28, 2011	No	Core & Pro Guitar/Bass
"Talk Dirty to Me"	Poison	1986	Glam	Poison 01	Jun 28, 2011	No	Core
"Unskinny Bop"	Poison	1990	Glam	Poison 01	Jun 28, 2011	No	Core
"For What It's Worth"	Buffalo Springfield	1967	Classic Rock	Single	Jul 5, 2011	No	Core & Pro Guitar/Bass
"Man on the Moon"	R.E.M.	1992	Alternative	Single	Jul 5, 2011	No	Core
"Aerials"	System of a Down	2001	Nu-Metal	Single	Jul 5, 2011	Yes	Core & Pro Guitar/Bass
"Hypnotize"	System of a Down	2005	Nu-Metal	Single	Jul 5, 2011	Yes	Core
"Turning Japanese"	The Vapors	1980	Punk	Single	Jul 5, 2011	No	Core & Pro Guitar/Bass
"A Little Respect"	Erasure	1988	New Wave	Single	Jul 12, 2011	Yes	Core
"Relax (Come Fighting)"	Frankie Goes to Hollywood	1984	Pop/Dance/Electronic	Single	Jul 12, 2011	No	Core
"Boom"	P.O.D.	2001	Nu-Metal	Single	Jul 12, 2011	No	Core & Pro Guitar/Bass
"Youth of the Nation"	P.O.D.	2001	Nu-Metal	Single	Jul 12, 2011	No	Core
"Blow Up the Outside World"	Soundgarden	1996	Grunge	Celebrating Soundgarden On Tour 2011	Jul 19, 2011	No	Core
"Burden in My Hand"	Soundgarden	1996	Grunge	Celebrating Soundgarden On Tour 2011	Jul 19, 2011	No	Core & Pro Guitar/Bass
"Fell on Black Days"	Soundgarden	1994	Grunge	Celebrating Soundgarden On Tour 2011	Jul 19, 2011	Yes	Core
"Outshined"	Soundgarden	1991	Grunge	Celebrating Soundgarden On Tour 2011	Jul 19, 2011	No	Core & Pro Guitar/Bass
"Rusty Cage"	Soundgarden	1991	Grunge	Celebrating Soundgarden On Tour 2011	Jul 19, 2011	No	Core
"The Day I Tried to Live"	Soundgarden	1994	Grunge	Celebrating Soundgarden On Tour 2011	Jul 19, 2011	No	Core & Pro Guitar/Bass
"Heart of the Sunrise"	Yes	1971	Prog	Yes 01	Jul 26, 2011	Yes	Core
"I've Seen All Good People"	Yes	1971	Prog	Yes 01	Jul 26, 2011	Yes	Core & Pro Guitar/Bass
"Owner of a Lonely Heart"	Yes	1983	Prog	Yes 01	Jul 26, 2011	Yes	Core & Pro Guitar/Bass
"South Side of the Sky"	Yes	1971	Prog	Yes 01	Jul 26, 2011	Yes	Core
"Starship Trooper"	Yes	1971	Prog	Yes 01	Jul 26, 2011	Yes	Core
"Make Some Noise"	Beastie Boys	2011	Hip-Hop/Rap	Single	Aug 2, 2011	No	Core
"No Sleep till Brooklyn"	Beastie Boys	1986	Hip-Hop/Rap	Single	Aug 2, 2011	No	Core
"Barracuda"	Heart	1977	Classic Rock	Single	Aug 2, 2011	Yes	Core & Pro Guitar/Bass
"Super Bad, Pts. 1 & 2"	James Brown	1970	R&B/Soul/Funk	Single	Aug 2, 2011	No	Core & Pro Guitar/Bass
"Tell Me Something Good"	Rufus (featuring Chaka Khan)	1974	R&B/Soul/Funk	Single	Aug 2, 2011	No	Core
"Animal" (Live)	Def Leppard	2011	Rock	Def Leppard 01	Aug 9, 2011	No	Core & Pro Guitar/Bass
"Bringin' On the Heartbreak"	Def Leppard	1981	Rock	Def Leppard 01	Aug 9, 2011	Yes	Core & Pro Guitar/Bass
"Photograph"	Def Leppard	1983	Rock	Def Leppard 01	Aug 9, 2011	No	Core & Pro Guitar/Bass
"Pour Some Sugar on Me" (Live)	Def Leppard	2011	Rock	Def Leppard 01	Aug 9, 2011	No	Core & Pro Guitar/Bass
"Rock of Ages"	Def Leppard	1983	Rock	Def Leppard 01	Aug 9, 2011	No	Core & Pro Guitar/Bass
"Undefeated"	Def Leppard	2011	Rock	Def Leppard 01	Aug 9, 2011	No	Core & Pro Guitar/Bass
"Dance, Dance"	Fall Out Boy	2005	Pop-Rock	Fall Out Boy 01	Aug 16, 2011	No	Core
"Sugar, We're Goin Down"	Fall Out Boy	2005	Pop-Rock	Fall Out Boy 01	Aug 16, 2011	No	Core & Pro Guitar/Bass
"Thnks fr th Mmrs"	Fall Out Boy	2007	Pop-Rock	Fall Out Boy 01	Aug 16, 2011	No	Core
"Child in Time"	Deep Purple	1970	Prog	Single	Aug 16, 2011	No	Core
"Adolescents"	Incubus	2011	Alternative	Incubus 01	Aug 23, 2011	Yes	Core
"Pardon Me"	Incubus	1999	Alternative	Incubus 01	Aug 23, 2011	No	Core & Pro Guitar/Bass
"Wish You Were Here"	Incubus	2001	Alternative	Incubus 01	Aug 23, 2011	Yes	Core
"By the Way"	Red Hot Chili Peppers	2002	Alternative	I'm With the Chili Peppers	Aug 30, 2011	No	Core & Pro Guitar/Bass
"Californication"	Red Hot Chili Peppers	1999	Alternative	I'm With the Chili Peppers	Aug 30, 2011	No	Core & Pro Guitar/Bass
"Look Around"	Red Hot Chili Peppers	2011	Alternative	I'm With the Chili Peppers	Aug 30, 2011	No	Core
"Monarchy of Roses"	Red Hot Chili Peppers	2011	Alternative	I'm With the Chili Peppers	Aug 30, 2011	No	Core
"Otherside"	Red Hot Chili Peppers	1999	Alternative	I'm With the Chili Peppers	Aug 30, 2011	No	Core & Pro Guitar/Bass
"Parallel Universe"	Red Hot Chili Peppers	1999	Alternative	I'm With the Chili Peppers	Aug 30, 2011	No	Core
"Scar Tissue"	Red Hot Chili Peppers	1999	Alternative	I'm With the Chili Peppers	Aug 30, 2011	No	Core
"The Adventures of Rain Dance Maggie"	Red Hot Chili Peppers	2011	Alternative	I'm With the Chili Peppers	Aug 30, 2011	No	Core & Pro Guitar/Bass
"I Want You to Want Me" (Live)	Cheap Trick	1979	Pop-Rock	Cheap Trick 01	Sep 6, 2011	Yes	Core
"Surrender" (Live)	Cheap Trick	1979	Pop-Rock	Cheap Trick 01	Sep 6, 2011	No	Core & Pro Guitar/Bass
"Dream Police"	Cheap Trick	1979	Pop-Rock	Cheap Trick 01	Sep 6, 2011	Yes	Core
"Unbelievable" (Rock Band Re-Record)	EMF	1991	Pop/Dance/Electronic	Single	Sep 6, 2011	No	Core & Pro Guitar/Bass
"Me and Bobby McGee"	Janis Joplin & the Full Tilt Boogie Band	1971	Classic Rock	Single	Sep 13, 2011	Yes	Core
"Hash Pipe"	Weezer	2001	Alternative	Weezer 04	Sep 13, 2011	No	Core & Pro Guitar/Bass
"Island in the Sun"	Weezer	2001	Alternative	Weezer 04	Sep 13, 2011	Yes	Core
"Perfect Situation"	Weezer	2005	Alternative	Weezer 04	Sep 13, 2011	No	Core
"Heart-Shaped Box"	Nirvana	1993	Grunge	Celebrating Nirvana	Sep 20, 2011	No	Core & Pro Guitar/Bass
"Rape Me"	Nirvana	1993	Grunge	Celebrating Nirvana	Sep 20, 2011	No	Core
"All Apologies"	Nirvana	1993	Grunge	Celebrating Nirvana	Sep 20, 2011	No	Core
"You Know You're Right"	Nirvana	2002	Grunge	Celebrating Nirvana	Sep 20, 2011	Yes	Core
"Wait and Bleed"	Slipknot	1999	Nu-Metal	Slipknot 02	Sep 27, 2011	No	Core & Pro Guitar/Bass
"Left Behind"	Slipknot	2001	Nu-Metal	Slipknot 02	Sep 27, 2011	No	Core
"Pulse of the Maggots"	Slipknot	2004	Nu-Metal	Slipknot 02	Sep 27, 2011	No	Core
"Snuff"	Slipknot	2008	Nu-Metal	Slipknot 02	Sep 27, 2011	No	Core & Pro Guitar/Bass
"Gold Cobra"	Limp Bizkit	2011	Nu-Metal	Limp Bizkit 01	Oct 4, 2011	No	Core
"Nookie"	Limp Bizkit	1999	Nu-Metal	Limp Bizkit 01	Oct 4, 2011	No	Core & Pro Guitar/Bass
"My Way"	Limp Bizkit	2000	Nu-Metal	Limp Bizkit 01	Oct 4, 2011	No	Core
"Re-Arranged"	Limp Bizkit	1999	Nu-Metal	Limp Bizkit 01	Oct 4, 2011	No	Core
"Rock the Casbah"	The Clash	1982	Punk	Single	Oct 11, 2011	No	Core & Pro Guitar/Bass
"The Party Song"	Blink-182	1999	Punk	Blink-182 03	Oct 11, 2011	No	Core
"Stay Together for the Kids"	Blink-182	2001	Punk	Blink-182 03	Oct 11, 2011	Yes	Core
"Up All Night"	Blink-182	2011	Punk	Blink-182 03	Oct 11, 2011	Yes	Core & Pro Guitar/Bass
"Yellow"	Coldplay	2000	Alternative	Coldplay Collection 01	Oct 18, 2011	Yes	Core & Pro Guitar/Bass
"The Scientist"	Coldplay	2002	Alternative	Coldplay Collection 01	Oct 18, 2011	Yes	Core
"Clocks"	Coldplay	2002	Alternative	Coldplay Collection 01	Oct 18, 2011	Yes	Core & Pro Guitar/Bass
"Fix You"	Coldplay	2005	Alternative	Coldplay Collection 01	Oct 18, 2011	Yes	Core
"Viva la Vida"	Coldplay	2008	Alternative	Coldplay Collection 01	Oct 18, 2011	No	Core
"Every Teardrop Is a Waterfall"	Coldplay	2011	Alternative	Coldplay Collection 01	Oct 18, 2011	Yes	Core
"I Believe in a Thing Called Love"	The Darkness	2003	Glam	Single	Oct 25, 2011	No	Core & Pro Guitar/Bass
"Living Dead Girl"	Rob Zombie	1998	Nu-Metal	Single	Oct 25, 2011	No	Core
"Thunder Kiss '65"	White Zombie	1992	Metal	Single	Oct 25, 2011	No	Core
"Super-Charger Heaven"	White Zombie	1995	Metal	Single	Oct 25, 2011	No	Core & Pro Guitar/Bass
"Sooner or Later"	Breaking Benjamin	2004	Rock	Breaking Benjamin 02	Nov 1, 2011	Yes	Core
"Breath"	Breaking Benjamin	2006	Rock	Breaking Benjamin 02	Nov 1, 2011	No	Core & Pro Guitar/Bass
"Until the End"	Breaking Benjamin	2006	Rock	Breaking Benjamin 02	Nov 1, 2011	Yes	Core
"Forever"	Papa Roach	2006	Nu-Metal	Single	Nov 1, 2011	No	Core
"Single White Female" (RB3 Version)	Chely Wright	1999	Country	Going Country 05	Nov 8, 2011	No	Core
"Giddy On Up" (RB3 Version)	Laura Bell Bundy	2010	Country	Going Country 05	Nov 8, 2011	No	Core
"The Night The Lights Went Out in Georgia" (RB3 Version)	Reba McEntire	1991	Country	Going Country 05	Nov 8, 2011	No	Core
"Party for Two" (With Billy Currington) (RB3 Version)	Shania Twain	2004	Country	Going Country 05	Nov 8, 2011	No	Core
"Settlin'" (RB3 Version)	Sugarland	2006	Country	Going Country 05	Nov 8, 2011	No	Core
"That's How Country Boys Roll" (RB3 Version)	Billy Currington	2008	Country	Going Country 06	Nov 8, 2011	No	Core
"Awful, Beautiful Life" (RB3 Version)	Darryl Worley	2004	Country	Going Country 06	Nov 8, 2011	No	Core
"Man of Me" (RB3 Version)	Gary Allan	2001	Country	Going Country 06	Nov 8, 2011	No	Core
"Twang" (RB3 Version)	George Strait	2009	Country	Going Country 06	Nov 8, 2011	No	Core
"Ring of Fire" (RB3 Version)	Johnny Cash	1963	Country	Going Country 06	Nov 8, 2011	No	Core
"Backwoods" (RB3 Version)	Justin Moore	2009	Country	Going Country 06	Nov 8, 2011	No	Core
"Alright" (RB3 Version)	Darius Rucker	2008	Country	Going Country 07	Nov 8, 2011	No	Core
"Sideways" (RB3 Version)	Dierks Bentley	2009	Country	Going Country 07	Nov 8, 2011	No	Core
"Kiss a Girl" (RB3 Version)	Keith Urban	2009	Country	Going Country 07	Nov 8, 2011	No	Core
"Perfect Day" (RB3 Version)	Lady Antebellum	2010	Country	Going Country 07	Nov 8, 2011	No	Core
"Rain Is a Good Thing" (RB3 Version)	Luke Bryan	2009	Country	Going Country 07	Nov 8, 2011	No	Core
"Mama Tried" (RB3 Version)	Merle Haggard	1968	Country	Going Country 07	Nov 8, 2011	No	Core
"Ride" (RB3 Version)	Trace Adkins	2006	Country	Going Country 07	Nov 8, 2011	No	Core & Pro Guitar/Bass
"Intentional Heartache" (RB3 Version)	Dwight Yoakam	2005	Country	Going Country 08	Nov 8, 2011	No	Core
"Crazy Town" (RB3 Version)	Jason Aldean	2009	Country	Going Country 08	Nov 8, 2011	No	Core
"Summer Nights" (RB3 Version)	Rascal Flatts	2009	Country	Going Country 08	Nov 8, 2011	No	Core
"Superstition"	Stevie Wonder	1972	R&B/Soul/Funk	Stevie Wonder 01	Nov 15, 2011	Yes	Core
"Higher Ground"	Stevie Wonder	1973	R&B/Soul/Funk	Stevie Wonder 01	Nov 15, 2011	No	Core
"Living for the City"	Stevie Wonder	1973	R&B/Soul/Funk	Stevie Wonder 01	Nov 15, 2011	Yes	Core
"Sir Duke"	Stevie Wonder	1976	R&B/Soul/Funk	Stevie Wonder 01	Nov 15, 2011	Yes	Core & Pro Guitar/Bass
"I Wish"	Stevie Wonder	1976	R&B/Soul/Funk	Stevie Wonder 01	Nov 15, 2011	No	Core & Pro Guitar/Bass
"How You Remind Me"	Nickelback	2001	Rock	Nickelback Then and Now	Nov 22, 2011	No	Core & Pro Guitar/Bass
"Someday"	Nickelback	2003	Rock	Nickelback Then and Now	Nov 22, 2011	No	Core
"Animals"	Nickelback	2005	Rock	Nickelback Then and Now	Nov 22, 2011	No	Core
"If Today Was Your Last Day"	Nickelback	2008	Rock	Nickelback Then and Now	Nov 22, 2011	No	Core
"This Means War"	Nickelback	2011	Rock	Nickelback Then and Now	Nov 22, 2011	No	Core
"On the Backs of Angels"	Dream Theater	2011	Prog	Roadrunner Records 02	Nov 29, 2011	No	Core & Pro Guitar/Bass
"Ghost of Perdition"	Opeth	2005	Prog	Roadrunner Records 02	Nov 29, 2011	No	Core
"In Waves"	Trivium	2011	Metal	Roadrunner Records 02	Nov 29, 2011	Yes	Core
"We Built This City"	Starship	1985	Pop-Rock	Single	Nov 29, 2011	Yes	Core
"Seven Seas of Rhye"	Queen	1974	Classic Rock	Queen Extravaganza 02	Dec 6, 2011	Yes	Core
"Stone Cold Crazy"	Queen	1974	Classic Rock	Queen Extravaganza 02	Dec 6, 2011	No	Core & Pro Guitar/Bass
"I'm in Love With My Car"	Queen	1975	Classic Rock	Queen Extravaganza 02	Dec 6, 2011	Yes	Core
"You're My Best Friend"	Queen	1975	Classic Rock	Queen Extravaganza 02	Dec 6, 2011	Yes	Core
"Long Away"	Queen	1976	Classic Rock	Queen Extravaganza 02	Dec 6, 2011	Yes	Core
"Bicycle Race"	Queen	1978	Classic Rock	Queen Extravaganza 02	Dec 6, 2011	No	Core & Pro Guitar/Bass
"Don't Stop Me Now"	Queen	1978	Classic Rock	Queen Extravaganza 02	Dec 6, 2011	No	Core
"Radio Ga Ga"	Queen	1984	Classic Rock	Queen Extravaganza 02	Dec 6, 2011	Yes	Core
"The Show Must Go On"	Queen	1991	Classic Rock	Queen Extravaganza 02	Dec 6, 2011	Yes	Core
"Fly by Night"	Rush	1975	Prog	Rush 01	Dec 13, 2011	Yes	Core & Pro Guitar/Bass
"Caravan"	Rush	2010	Prog	Rush 01	Dec 13, 2011	Yes	Core
"The Spirit of Radio (Live)"	Rush	1980	Prog	Rush 01	Dec 13, 2011	Yes	Core & Pro Guitar/Bass
"Rebel Love Song"	Black Veil Brides	2011	Rock	Single	Dec 13, 2011	Yes	Core
"A Warrior's Call"	Volbeat	2010	Metal	Single	Dec 13, 2011	No	Core
"Long Hot Summer Night"	The Jimi Hendrix Experience	1968	Classic Rock	Experience Jimi Hendrix 01	Dec 20, 2011	Yes	Core
"Gypsy Eyes"	The Jimi Hendrix Experience	1968	Classic Rock	Experience Jimi Hendrix 01	Dec 20, 2011	Yes	Core
"All Along the Watchtower"	The Jimi Hendrix Experience	1968	Classic Rock	Experience Jimi Hendrix 01	Dec 20, 2011	Yes	Core & Pro Guitar/Bass
"Voodoo Child (Slight Return) (Live)"	Jimi Hendrix	1969	Classic Rock	Experience Jimi Hendrix 01	Dec 20, 2011	Yes	Core
"Dolly Dagger"	Jimi Hendrix	1971	Classic Rock	Experience Jimi Hendrix 01	Dec 20, 2011	No	Core
"Freedom"	Jimi Hendrix	1971	Classic Rock	Experience Jimi Hendrix 01	Dec 20, 2011	No	Core & Pro Guitar/Bass
"Angel"	Jimi Hendrix	1971	Classic Rock	Experience Jimi Hendrix 01	Dec 20, 2011	Yes	Core
"You Make Me Feel..."	Cobra Starship (ft. Sabi)	2011	Pop/Dance/Electronic	Fueled by Ramen 01	Dec 27, 2011	Yes	Core
"Stereo Hearts"	Gym Class Heroes (ft. Adam Levine)	2011	Hip-Hop/Rap	Fueled by Ramen 01	Dec 27, 2011	Yes	Core
"I Write Sins Not Tragedies"	Panic! at the Disco	2005	Emo	Fueled by Ramen 01	Dec 27, 2011	No	Core & Pro Guitar/Bass
"Pressure"	Paramore	2005	Pop-Rock	Fueled by Ramen 01	Dec 27, 2011	Yes	Core
"Panic"	Sublime with Rome	2011	Reggae/Ska	Fueled by Ramen 01	Dec 27, 2011	Yes	Core & Pro Guitar/Bass
"Billionaire"	Travie McCoy (ft. Bruno Mars)	2010	Hip-Hop/Rap	Fueled by Ramen 01	Dec 27, 2011	No	Core
"2112"	Rush	1976	Prog	Rush '2112'	Dec 31, 2011	Yes	Core & Pro Guitar/Bass
"2112: Overture, The Temples of Syrinx"	Rush	1976	Prog	Rush '2112'	Dec 31, 2011	Yes	Core & Pro Guitar/Bass
"2112: Discovery, Presentation"	Rush	1976	Prog	Rush '2112'	Dec 31, 2011	Yes	Core & Pro Guitar/Bass
"2112: Oracle: The Dream, Soliloquy, Grand Finale"	Rush	1976	Prog	Rush '2112'	Dec 31, 2011	Yes	Core & Pro Guitar/Bass
"Private Eyes"	Hall & Oates	1981	Pop-Rock	Hall & Oates 01	Jan 10, 2012	Yes	Core & Pro Guitar/Bass
"I Can't Go for That (No Can Do)"	Hall & Oates	1981	Pop-Rock	Hall & Oates 01	Jan 10, 2012	Yes	Core
"Maneater"	Hall & Oates	1982	Pop-Rock	Hall & Oates 01	Jan 10, 2012	Yes	Core
"Free Ride"	The Edgar Winter Group	1972	Classic Rock	Single	Jan 17, 2012	Yes	Core
"Frankenstein"	The Edgar Winter Group	1972	Classic Rock	Single	Jan 17, 2012	Yes	Core & Pro Guitar/Bass
"Freak on a Leash"	Korn	1998	Nu-Metal	Single	Jan 17, 2012	No	Core
"Falling Away From Me"	Korn	1998	Nu-Metal	Single	Jan 17, 2012	No	Core
"Lodi"	Creedence Clearwater Revival	1969	Southern Rock	Creedence Clearwater Revival 02	Jan 24, 2012	No	Core
"Have You Ever Seen the Rain?"	Creedence Clearwater Revival	1970	Southern Rock	Creedence Clearwater Revival 02	Jan 24, 2012	Yes	Core & Pro Guitar/Bass
"Susie Q"	Creedence Clearwater Revival	1968	Southern Rock	Creedence Clearwater Revival 02	Jan 24, 2012	Yes	Core
"Fat Lip"	Sum 41	2001	Punk	Single	Jan 31, 2012	No	Core & Pro Guitar/Bass
"Still Waiting"	Sum 41	2002	Punk	Single	Jan 31, 2012	No	Core
"Head Over Heels"	Tears for Fears	1985	New Wave	Single	Jan 31, 2012	Yes	Core
"Everything Zen"	Bush	1994	Grunge	Bush 01	Feb 7, 2012	No	Core
"Comedown"	Bush	1994	Grunge	Bush 01	Feb 7, 2012	No	Core
"Machinehead"	Bush	1994	Grunge	Bush 01	Feb 7, 2012	No	Core & Pro Guitar/Bass
"Alone"	Heart	1987	Classic Rock	Gold Star My Heart	Feb 14, 2012	Yes	Core
"To Be With You"	Mr. Big	1991	Rock	Gold Star My Heart	Feb 14, 2012	Yes	Core & Pro Guitar/Bass
"Every Rose Has Its Thorn"	Poison	1988	Glam	Gold Star My Heart	Feb 14, 2012	No	Core & Pro Guitar/Bass
"Never Gonna Give You Up"	Rick Astley	1987	Pop/Dance/Electronic	Gold Star My Heart	Feb 14, 2012	Yes	Core
"Symphony of Destruction"	Megadeth	1992	Metal	Megadeth 01	Feb 21, 2012	No	Core & Pro Guitar/Bass
"A Tout le Monde"	Megadeth	1994	Metal	Megadeth 01	Feb 21, 2012	No	Core
"Public Enemy No. 1"	Megadeth	2011	Metal	Megadeth 01	Feb 21, 2012	No	Core
"Do You Believe in Love"	Huey Lewis and The News	1982	Rock	Huey Lewis and The News 01	Feb 28, 2012	Yes	Core
"The Heart of Rock & Roll"	Huey Lewis and The News	1983	Rock	Huey Lewis and The News 01	Feb 28, 2012	Yes	Core
"I Want a New Drug"	Huey Lewis and The News	1983	Rock	Huey Lewis and The News 01	Feb 28, 2012	No	Core & Pro Guitar/Bass
"Santa Monica"	Everclear	1995	Alternative	Single	Mar 6, 2012	Yes	Core & Pro Guitar/Bass
"The Anthem"	Good Charlotte	2002	Pop-Rock	Single	Mar 6, 2012	No	Core
"Curl of the Burl"	Mastodon	2011	Metal	Single	Mar 6, 2012	No	Core
"The Good Life"	Three Days Grace	2009	Rock	Three Days Grace 01	Mar 13, 2012	Yes	Core
"I Hate Everything About You"	Three Days Grace	2003	Rock	Three Days Grace 01	Mar 13, 2012	No	Core
"Pain"	Three Days Grace	2006	Rock	Three Days Grace 01	Mar 13, 2012	No	Core & Pro Guitar/Bass
"Down Under"	Men at Work	1982	New Wave	Single	Mar 20, 2012	No	Core
"Overkill"	Men at Work	1983	New Wave	Single	Mar 20, 2012	Yes	Core
"Smooth"	Santana (ft. Rob Thomas)	1999	Rock	Single	Mar 20, 2012	Yes	Core & Pro Guitar/Bass
"Second Chance"	Shinedown	2008	Nu-Metal	Sounds of Shinedown Pack	Mar 27, 2012	No	Core & Pro Guitar/Bass
"The Crow and the Butterfly"	Shinedown	2008	Nu-Metal	Sounds of Shinedown Pack	Mar 27, 2012	No	Core
"Bully"	Shinedown	2012	Nu-Metal	Sounds of Shinedown Pack	Mar 27, 2012	No	Core
"Everybody's Fool"	Evanescence	2003	Nu-Metal	Evanescence 02	Apr 3, 2012	Yes	Core & Pro Guitar/Bass
"Lithium"	Evanescence	2006	Nu-Metal	Evanescence 02	Apr 3, 2012	No	Core
"What You Want"	Evanescence	2011	Nu-Metal	Evanescence 02	Apr 3, 2012	Yes	Core
"Raining Blood"	Slayer	1986	Metal	Slayer 01	Apr 10, 2012	No	Core & Pro Guitar/Bass
"South of Heaven"	Slayer	1988	Metal	Slayer 01	Apr 10, 2012	No	Core
"Seasons in the Abyss"	Slayer	1990	Metal	Slayer 01	Apr 10, 2012	No	Core
"Get the Party Started"	P!nk	2001	Pop-Rock	P!nk 01	Apr 17, 2012	No	Core & Pro Guitar/Bass
"Funhouse"	P!nk	2008	Pop-Rock	P!nk 01	Apr 17, 2012	No	Core
"Please Don't Leave Me"	P!nk	2008	Pop-Rock	P!nk 01	Apr 17, 2012	Yes	Core
"Sober"	P!nk	2008	Pop-Rock	P!nk 01	Apr 17, 2012	No	Core
"Nobody's Fool"	Cinderella	1986	Glam	Cinderella 01	Apr 24, 2012	Yes	Core
"Don't Know What You Got (Till It's Gone)"	Cinderella	1988	Glam	Cinderella 01	Apr 24, 2012	Yes	Core & Pro Guitar/Bass
"Shelter Me"	Cinderella	1990	Glam	Cinderella 01	Apr 24, 2012	No	Core
"Two Tickets to Paradise"	Eddie Money	1977	Classic Rock	Single	May 1, 2012	Yes	Core & Pro Guitar/Bass
"Only One"	Yellowcard	2003	Emo	Single	May 1, 2012	Yes	Core
"Drops of Jupiter"	Train	2001	Pop-Rock	Single	May 1, 2012	Yes	Core & Pro Guitar/Bass
"Bombtrack"	Rage Against the Machine	1992	Alternative	Rage Against the Machine 01	May 8, 2012	No	Core & Pro Guitar/Bass
"Killing in the Name"	Rage Against the Machine	1992	Alternative	Rage Against the Machine 01	May 8, 2012	No	Core
"Sleep Now in the Fire"	Rage Against the Machine	1999	Alternative	Rage Against the Machine 01	May 8, 2012	No	Core
"Ignorance"	Paramore	2009	Pop-Rock	Paramore 01	May 15, 2012	Yes	Core
"Brick by Boring Brick"	Paramore	2009	Pop-Rock	Paramore 01	May 15, 2012	Yes	Core
"The Only Exception"	Paramore	2009	Pop-Rock	Paramore 01	May 15, 2012	Yes	Core & Pro Guitar/Bass
"Phantom of the Opera"	Iron Maiden	1980	Metal	Maiden Epics	May 22, 2012	Yes	Core
"The Prisoner"	Iron Maiden	1982	Metal	Maiden Epics	May 22, 2012	No	Core
"Flight of Icarus"	Iron Maiden	1983	Metal	Maiden Epics	May 22, 2012	Yes	Core & Pro Guitar/Bass
"Rime of the Ancient Mariner"	Iron Maiden	1984	Metal	Maiden Epics	May 22, 2012	Yes	Core & Pro Guitar/Bass
"Infinite Dreams"	Iron Maiden	1988	Metal	Maiden Epics	May 22, 2012	Yes	Core
"Seventh Son of a Seventh Son"	Iron Maiden	1988	Metal	Maiden Epics	May 22, 2012	Yes	Core
"Tears Don't Fall"	Bullet for My Valentine	2006	Metal	Bullet for My Valentine 01	May 29, 2012	No	Core
"Scream Aim Fire"	Bullet for My Valentine	2008	Metal	Bullet for My Valentine 01	May 29, 2012	No	Core
"Your Betrayal"	Bullet for My Valentine	2010	Metal	Bullet for My Valentine 01	May 29, 2012	No	Core & Pro Guitar/Bass
"Teen Angst (What the World Needs Now)"	Cracker	1992	Alternative	Single	Jun 5, 2012	No	Core & Pro Guitar/Bass
"Dog Days Are Over"	Florence + the Machine	2009	Indie Rock	Single	Jun 5, 2012	Yes	Core
"Power and the Passion"	Midnight Oil	1982	New Wave	Single	Jun 5, 2012	Yes	Core
"Drive"	Incubus	1999	Alternative	Single	Jun 12, 2012	Yes	Core
"The Adventure"	Angels & Airwaves	2006	Alternative	Single	Jun 19, 2012	Yes	Core
"Fireflies"	Owl City	2009	Pop/Dance/Electronic	Single	Jun 19, 2012	Yes	Core
"In My Head"	Queens of the Stone Age	2005	Alternative	Single	Jun 19, 2012	No	Core & Pro Guitar/Bass
"Before He Cheats"	Carrie Underwood	2005	Country	Carrie Underwood 01	Jun 26, 2012	No	Core
"Cowboy Casanova"	Carrie Underwood	2009	Country	Carrie Underwood 01	Jun 26, 2012	No	Core
"Good Girl"	Carrie Underwood	2012	Country	Carrie Underwood 01	Jun 26, 2012	Yes	Core & Pro Guitar/Bass
"Gonzo"	All-American Rejects	2012	Emo	Single	Jul 3, 2012	Yes	Core
"Happy?"	Mudvayne	2005	Metal	Single	Jul 3, 2012	No	Core & Pro Guitar/Bass
"Satellite"	Rise Against	2011	Punk	Single	Jul 3, 2012	Yes	Core
"It's Not Over"	Daughtry	2006	Rock	Daughtry 01	Jul 10, 2012	Yes	Core
"No Surprise"	Daughtry	2009	Rock	Daughtry 01	Jul 10, 2012	Yes	Core & Pro Guitar/Bass
"Crawling Back to You"	Daughtry	2011	Rock	Daughtry 01	Jul 10, 2012	Yes	Core
"Love Shack"	The B-52's	1989	New Wave	Single	Jul 17, 2012	Yes	Core & Pro Guitar/Bass
"Not Again"	Staind	2011	Nu-Metal	Single	Jul 17, 2012	Yes	Core
"My Body"	Young the Giant	2010	Indie Rock	Single	Jul 17, 2012	Yes	Core
"Helena Beat"	Foster the People	2011	Indie Rock	Foster the People 01	Jul 24, 2012	Yes	Core
"Don't Stop (Color on the Walls)"	Foster the People	2011	Indie Rock	Foster the People 01	Jul 24, 2012	Yes	Core
"Under Cover of Darkness"	The Strokes	2011	Rock	Single	Jul 24, 2012	Yes	Core & Pro Guitar/Bass
"The End of Heartache"	Killswitch Engage	2004	Metal	Killswitch Engage 01	Jul 31, 2012	Yes	Core & Pro Guitar/Bass
"The Arms of Sorrow"	Killswitch Engage	2006	Metal	Killswitch Engage 01	Jul 31, 2012	Yes	Core
"Starting Over"	Killswitch Engage	2009	Metal	Killswitch Engage 01	Jul 31, 2012	Yes	Core
"(I Just) Died in Your Arms"	Cutting Crew	1986	New Wave	Single	Aug 7, 2012	Yes	Core & Pro Guitar/Bass
"Still of the Night"	Whitesnake	1987	Glam	Single	Aug 7, 2012	No	Core
"Crawling in the Dark"	Hoobastank	2001	Alternative	Single	Aug 7, 2012	Yes	Core
"I Want to Know What Love Is"	Foreigner	1983	Classic Rock	Single	Aug 14, 2012	Yes	Core
"Waiting for a Girl Like You"	Foreigner	1981	Classic Rock	Single	Aug 14, 2012	No	Core
"Amaranth"	Nightwish	2007	Metal	Single	Aug 14, 2012	Yes	Core & Pro Guitar/Bass
"Tighten Up"	The Black Keys	2010	Rock	The Black Keys 02	Aug 21, 2012	Yes	Core & Pro Guitar/Bass
"Howlin' for You"	The Black Keys	2010	Rock	The Black Keys 02	Aug 21, 2012	Yes	Core
"Lonely Boy"	The Black Keys	2011	Rock	The Black Keys 02	Aug 21, 2012	Yes	Core
"Breaking the Habit"	Linkin Park	2003	Nu-Metal	Linkin Park 02	Sep 4, 2012	Yes	Core
"Shadow of the Day"	Linkin Park	2007	Nu-Metal	Linkin Park 02	Sep 4, 2012	Yes	Core
"New Divide"	Linkin Park	2009	Nu-Metal	Linkin Park 02	Sep 4, 2012	Yes	Core & Pro Guitar/Bass
"Burn It Down"	Linkin Park	2012	Nu-Metal	Linkin Park 02	Sep 4, 2012	Yes	Core
"Bent"	Matchbox Twenty	2000	Alternative	Matchbox Twenty 01	Sep 11, 2012	Yes	Core
"How Far We've Come"	Matchbox Twenty	2007	Alternative	Matchbox Twenty 01	Sep 11, 2012	Yes	Core & Pro Guitar/Bass
"She's So Mean"	Matchbox Twenty	2012	Alternative	Matchbox Twenty 01	Sep 11, 2012	No	Core
"Days Go By"	The Offspring	2012	Punk	Single	Sep 18, 2012	Yes	Core & Pro Guitar/Bass
"Why Can't We Be Friends?"	Smash Mouth	1997	Pop-Rock	Single	Sep 18, 2012	No	Core
"Can’t Get Enough of You Baby"	Smash Mouth	1999	Pop-Rock	Single	Sep 18, 2012	Yes	Core
"Oh Love"	Green Day	2012	Rock	Green Day 03	Sep 25, 2012	Yes	Core
"Brain Stew / Jaded" (Note: Songs are also available as imports from Green Day: Rock Band.)	Green Day	1995	Punk	Green Day 03	Sep 25, 2012	No	Backing vocals
"Good Riddance (Time of Your Life)"	Green Day	1997	Punk	Green Day 03	Sep 25, 2012	Yes	None
"Warning"	Green Day	2000	Rock	Green Day 03	Sep 25, 2012	Yes	Backing vocals
"Minority"	Green Day	2000	Rock	Green Day 03	Sep 25, 2012	Yes	Backing vocals
"Down"	311	1995	Alternative	311 01	Oct 2, 2012	Yes	Core & Pro Guitar/Bass
"Beautiful Disaster"	311	1997	Alternative	311 01	Oct 2, 2012	Yes	Core
"Amber"	311	2001	Alternative	311 01	Oct 2, 2012	Yes	Core
"I Ran (So Far Away)"	A Flock of Seagulls	1982	New Wave	Single	Oct 9, 2012	Yes	Core
"The Stroke"	Billy Squier	1981	Classic Rock	Single	Oct 9, 2012	No	Core & Pro Guitar/Bass
"Everybody Wants You"	Billy Squier	1982	Classic Rock	Single	Oct 9, 2012	No	Core
"Come On Eileen"	Save Ferris	1997	Reggae/Ska	Single	Oct 16, 2012	No	Core & Pro Guitar/Bass
"All I Wanna Do"	Sheryl Crow	1993	Pop-Rock	Single	Oct 16, 2012	No	Core
"Animal I Have Become"	Three Days Grace	2006	Rock	Single	Oct 16, 2012	Yes	Core
"Make Me Smile"	Chicago	1970	Classic Rock	Chicago 01	Oct 23, 2012	Yes	Core & Pro Guitar/Bass
"Feelin' Stronger Every Day"	Chicago	1973	Classic Rock	Chicago 01	Oct 23, 2012	Yes	Core
"If You Leave Me Now"	Chicago	1976	Classic Rock	Chicago 01	Oct 23, 2012	Yes	Core
"What I Got"	Sublime	1996	Reggae/Ska	Sublime 01	Oct 29, 2012	No	Core
"Wrong Way"	Sublime	1996	Reggae/Ska	Sublime 01	Oct 29, 2012	No	Core
"Santeria"	Sublime	1996	Reggae/Ska	Sublime 01	Oct 29, 2012	No	Core & Pro Guitar/Bass
"Ants Marching"	Dave Matthews Band	1994	Rock	Dave Matthews Band 01	Nov 6, 2012	Yes	Core & Pro Guitar/Bass
"Mercy"	Dave Matthews Band	2012	Rock	Dave Matthews Band 01	Nov 6, 2012	Yes	Core
"So Much to Say"	Dave Matthews Band	1996	Rock	Dave Matthews Band 01	Nov 6, 2012	Yes	Core
"I'm Alright"	Kenny Loggins	1980	Pop-Rock	Single	Nov 13, 2012	Yes	Core
"Footloose"	Kenny Loggins	1984	Pop-Rock	Single	Nov 13, 2012	Yes	Core & Pro Guitar/Bass
"Geek Stink Breath"	Green Day	1995	Punk	Green Day 04	Nov 13, 2012	No	Backing vocals
"Nice Guys Finish Last"	Green Day	1997	Punk	Green Day 04	Nov 13, 2012	No	Backing vocals
"Hitchin' a Ride"	Green Day	1997	Punk	Green Day 04	Nov 13, 2012	No	Backing vocals
"Song of the Century"	Green Day	2009	Rock	21st Century Breakdown	Nov 13, 2012	No	None
"21st Century Breakdown"	Green Day	2009	Rock	21st Century Breakdown	Nov 13, 2012	No	Backing vocals
"Before the Lobotomy"	Green Day	2009	Rock	21st Century Breakdown	Nov 13, 2012	No	Backing vocals
"Last Night on Earth"	Green Day	2009	Rock	21st Century Breakdown	Nov 13, 2012	Yes	Backing vocals
"Peacemaker"	Green Day	2009	Rock	21st Century Breakdown	Nov 13, 2012	No	Backing vocals
"Murder City"	Green Day	2009	Rock	21st Century Breakdown	Nov 13, 2012	No	Backing vocals
"¿Viva la Gloria? (Little Girl)"	Green Day	2009	Rock	21st Century Breakdown	Nov 13, 2012	No	Backing vocals
"Restless Heart Syndrome"	Green Day	2009	Rock	21st Century Breakdown	Nov 13, 2012	No	Backing vocals
"Horseshoes and Handgrenades"	Green Day	2009	Rock	21st Century Breakdown	Nov 13, 2012	No	Backing vocals
"The Static Age"	Green Day	2009	Rock	21st Century Breakdown	Nov 13, 2012	No	Backing vocals
"American Eulogy"	Green Day	2009	Rock	21st Century Breakdown	Nov 13, 2012	No	Backing vocals
"See the Light"	Green Day	2009	Rock	21st Century Breakdown	Nov 13, 2012	No	Backing vocals
"American Idiot"	Green Day	2004	Rock	American Idiot	Nov 13, 2012	No	Pro Guitar/Bass
"Jesus of Suburbia"	Green Day	2004	Rock	American Idiot	Nov 13, 2012	No	Backing vocals
"Holiday"	Green Day	2004	Rock	American Idiot	Nov 13, 2012	No	Backing vocals
"Boulevard of Broken Dreams"	Green Day	2004	Rock	American Idiot	Nov 13, 2012	No	Backing vocals
"Are We the Waiting / St. Jimmy"	Green Day	2004	Rock	American Idiot	Nov 13, 2012	No	Backing vocals
"Give Me Novacaine / She's a Rebel"	Green Day	2004	Rock	American Idiot	Nov 13, 2012	Yes	Backing vocals
"Extraordinary Girl"	Green Day	2004	Rock	American Idiot	Nov 13, 2012	Yes	Backing vocals
"Letterbomb"	Green Day	2004	Rock	American Idiot	Nov 13, 2012	No	Backing vocals
"Wake Me Up When September Ends"	Green Day	2004	Rock	American Idiot	Nov 13, 2012	Yes	None
"Homecoming"	Green Day	2004	Rock	American Idiot	Nov 13, 2012	No	Backing vocals
"Whatsername"	Green Day	2004	Rock	American Idiot	Nov 13, 2012	Yes	None
"Burnout"	Green Day	1994	Punk	Dookie	Nov 13, 2012	No	Backing vocals
"Having a Blast"	Green Day	1994	Punk	Dookie	Nov 13, 2012	No	Backing vocals
"Chump"	Green Day	1994	Punk	Dookie	Nov 13, 2012	Yes	Backing vocals
"Longview"	Green Day	1994	Punk	Dookie	Nov 13, 2012	No	Backing vocals
"Welcome to Paradise"	Green Day	1994	Punk	Dookie	Nov 13, 2012	No	Backing vocals
"Pulling Teeth"	Green Day	1994	Punk	Dookie	Nov 13, 2012	No	Backing vocals
"Basket Case"	Green Day	1994	Punk	Dookie	Nov 13, 2012	No	Backing vocals
"She"	Green Day	1994	Punk	Dookie	Nov 13, 2012	No	Backing vocals
"Sassafras Roots"	Green Day	1994	Punk	Dookie	Nov 13, 2012	No	Backing vocals
"When I Come Around"	Green Day	1994	Punk	Dookie	Nov 13, 2012	No	Backing vocals & Pro Guitar/Bass
"Coming Clean"	Green Day	1994	Punk	Dookie	Nov 13, 2012	Yes	None
"Emenius Sleepus"	Green Day	1994	Punk	Dookie	Nov 13, 2012	Yes	Backing vocals
"In the End"	Green Day	1994	Punk	Dookie	Nov 13, 2012	No	Backing vocals
"F.O.D."	Green Day	1994	Punk	Dookie	Nov 13, 2012	No	Backing vocals
"Jessica"	The Allman Brothers Band	1973	Southern Rock	Single	Nov 20, 2012	Yes	Core & Pro Guitar/Bass
"The Weight (Live)"	The Band	1972	Classic Rock	Single	Nov 20, 2012	Yes	Core & Pro Guitar/Bass
"Cold"	Crossfade	2004	Rock	Single	Nov 20, 2012	No	Core
"Cry Thunder"	DragonForce	2012	Metal	Single	Nov 20, 2012	Yes	Core
"I Melt With You"	Modern English	1982	New Wave	Single	Nov 20, 2012	Yes	Core
"Closer"	Nine Inch Nails	1994	Rock	Single	Nov 20, 2012	No	Core
"Call Me Maybe"	Carly Rae Jepsen	2012	Pop/Dance/Electronic	Single	Nov 27, 2012	Yes	Core
"Sex and Candy"	Marcy Playground	1997	Alternative	Single	Nov 27, 2012	No	Core & Pro Guitar/Bass
"She Talks to Angels"	The Black Crowes	1990	Southern Rock	The Black Crowes 01	Dec 4, 2012	Yes	Core & Pro Guitar/Bass
"Remedy"	The Black Crowes	1992	Southern Rock	The Black Crowes 01	Dec 4, 2012	No	Core
"Sometimes Salvation"	The Black Crowes	1992	Southern Rock	The Black Crowes 01	Dec 4, 2012	No	Core
"Possum Kingdom"	Toadies	1994	Grunge	Toadies 01	Dec 11, 2012	No	Core & Pro Guitar/Bass
"Away"	Toadies	1994	Grunge	Toadies 01	Dec 11, 2012	Yes	Core
"Tyler"	Toadies	1994	Grunge	Toadies 01	Dec 11, 2012	No	Core
"The Bitch Is Back"	Elton John	1974	Classic Rock	Elton John 01	Dec 18, 2012	No	Core
"Don't Let the Sun Go Down on Me"	Elton John	1974	Classic Rock	Elton John 01	Dec 18, 2012	Yes	Core
"I'm Still Standing" (Note: Songs are also available as imports from Rock Band Blitz.)	Elton John	1983	Classic Rock	Elton John 01	Dec 18, 2012	Yes	Core
"Helena"	My Chemical Romance	2004	Emo	My Chemical Romance 01	Dec 25, 2012	Yes	Core
"Teenagers"	My Chemical Romance	2006	Emo	My Chemical Romance 01	Dec 25, 2012	No	Core & Pro Guitar/Bass
"Sing"	My Chemical Romance	2010	Emo	My Chemical Romance 01	Dec 25, 2012	Yes	Core
"Party Hard"	Andrew W.K.	2001	Rock	Single	Dec 30, 2012	Yes	Core
"Tonight Tonight"	Hot Chelle Rae	2011	Pop/Dance/Electronic	Single	Dec 30, 2012	Yes	Core
"We Are Young"	fun. ft. Janelle Monáe	2012	Pop-Rock	Single	Dec 30, 2012	No	Core
"Raise Your Glass"	P!nk	2010	Pop-Rock	Single	Dec 30, 2012	No	Core
"Moves Like Jagger"	Maroon 5 ft. Christina Aguilera	2010	Pop-Rock	Single	Jan 8, 2013	No	Core
"Pumped Up Kicks"	Foster the People	2011	Indie Rock	Foster the People 01	Jan 8, 2013	No	Core
"These Days"	Foo Fighters	2011	Alternative	Single	Jan 8, 2013	Yes	Core
"Jessie's Girl"	Rick Springfield	1981	Classic Rock	Rick Springfield 01	Jan 15, 2013	Yes	Core & Pro Guitar/Bass
"I've Done Everything for You"	Rick Springfield	1981	Classic Rock	Rick Springfield 01	Jan 15, 2013	No	Core & Pro Guitar/Bass
"Don't Talk to Strangers"	Rick Springfield	1982	Classic Rock	Rick Springfield 01	Jan 15, 2013	No	Core
"Stronger (What Doesn't Kill You)"	Kelly Clarkson	2011	Pop/Dance/Electronic	Single	Jan 22, 2013	Yes	Core
"Cult of Personality"	Living Colour	1988	Rock	Single	Jan 22, 2013	Yes	Core & Pro Guitar/Bass
"Spoonman"	Soundgarden	1994	Grunge	Single	Jan 22, 2013	No	Core & Pro Guitar/Bass
"Bang Your Head (Metal Health)"	Quiet Riot	1983	Metal	Single	Jan 22, 2013	Yes	Core
"Walk This Way"	Aerosmith	1975	Rock	Aerosmith's Greatest Dimension	Jan 29, 2013	No	Core
"Sweet Emotion"	Aerosmith	1975	Rock	Aerosmith's Greatest Dimension	Jan 29, 2013	No	Core & Pro Guitar/Bass
"Dream On" (Live)	Aerosmith	1973	Rock	Aerosmith's Greatest Dimension	Jan 29, 2013	Yes	Core & Pro Guitar/Bass
"Legendary Child"	Aerosmith	2012	Rock	Aerosmith's Greatest Dimension	Jan 29, 2013	No	Core
"Lover Alot"	Aerosmith	2012	Rock	Aerosmith's Greatest Dimension	Jan 29, 2013	No	Core
"Back in the Saddle"	Aerosmith	1976	Rock	Aerosmith's Greatest Dimension	Jan 29, 2013	No	Core
"Death on Two Legs (Dedicated to...)"	Queen	1975	Classic Rock	Single	Feb 5, 2013	No	Core
"Once Bitten, Twice Shy"	Great White	1989	Glam	Single	Feb 5, 2013	No	Core
"So Far Away"	Avenged Sevenfold	2010	Metal	Single	Feb 5, 2013	Yes	Core
"The Wicker Man"	Iron Maiden	2000	Metal	Single	Feb 5, 2013	Yes	Core & Pro Guitar/Bass
"More Than Words" (Note: Song includes a Pro Guitar chart in the base price; the chart does not need to be purchased separately.)	Extreme	1990	Rock	Single	Feb 12, 2013	Yes	Core & Pro Guitar
"Love Hurts"	Nazareth	1975	Classic Rock	Single	Feb 12, 2013	Yes	Core
"Glory of Love"	Peter Cetera	1986	Pop-Rock	Single	Feb 12, 2013	Yes	Core
"Keep On Loving You"	REO Speedwagon	1980	Classic Rock	Single	Feb 12, 2013	Yes	Core
"Tainted Love"	Soft Cell	1981	Pop/Dance/Electronic	Single	Feb 12, 2013	Yes	Core
"One Week"	Barenaked Ladies	1998	Rock	Single	Feb 19, 2013	No	Core
"Shine (Rock Band Re-Record)"	Collective Soul	1994	Alternative	Single	Feb 19, 2013	Yes	Core
"A Little Less Sixteen Candles, A Little More "Touch Me""	Fall Out Boy	2005	Pop-Rock	Single	Feb 19, 2013	Yes	Core
"Got You (Where I Want You)"	The Flys	1998	Alternative	Single	Feb 26, 2013	No	Core & Pro Guitar/Bass
"Silent Lucidity"	Queensrÿche	1990	Prog	Single	Feb 26, 2013	Yes	Core
"It's Been Awhile"	Staind	2001	Nu-Metal	Single	Feb 26, 2013	No	Core
"So Far Away"	Staind	2003	Nu-Metal	Single	Feb 26, 2013	Yes	Core
"Kids in the Street"	The All-American Rejects	2012	Emo	Single	Mar 5, 2013	No	Core
"Always"	Blink-182	2003	Punk	Single	Mar 5, 2013	Yes	Core
"Give It Away"	Red Hot Chili Peppers	1991	Alternative	Single	Mar 5, 2013	No	Core & Pro Guitar/Bass
"Weird Science"	Oingo Boingo	1985	New Wave	Single	Mar 12, 2013	Yes	Core & Pro Guitar/Bass
"Rosanna"	Toto	1982	Pop-Rock	Single	Mar 12, 2013	Yes	Core
"Diamond Eyes (Boom-Lay Boom-Lay Boom)"	Shinedown	2010	Nu-Metal	Single	Mar 19, 2013	No	Core
"Jungle Boogie"	Kool and the Gang	1973	R&B/Soul/Funk	Single	Mar 19, 2013	Yes	Core & Pro Guitar/Bass
"Shout"	Tears for Fears	1985	New Wave	Single	Mar 19, 2013	Yes	Core
"Send the Pain Below"	Chevelle	2002	Rock	Chevelle 01	Mar 26, 2013	Yes	Core
"The Red"	Chevelle	2002	Rock	Chevelle 01	Mar 26, 2013	Yes	Core & Pro Guitar/Bass
"Face to the Floor"	Chevelle	2011	Rock	Chevelle 01	Mar 26, 2013	Yes	Core
"American Pie"	Don McLean	1971	Classic Rock	Single	Apr 2, 2013	No	Core
"R U Mine?"	Arctic Monkeys	2012	Rock	Single	Jan 13, 2015	No	Core
"Shepherd of Fire"	Avenged Sevenfold	2013	Metal	Single	Jan 13, 2015	No	Core
"Something from Nothing"	Foo Fighters	2014	Alternative	Single	Jan 13, 2015	No	Core
"Rize of the Fenix"	Tenacious D	2012	Rock	Single	Feb 17, 2015	No	Core
"Back to the Shack"	Weezer	2014	Alternative	Single	Feb 17, 2015	No	Core
"I Still Believe"	Frank Turner	2011	Rock	Single	Mar 5, 2015	Yes	Core

=== Playable in Rock Band 4 only ===
Song title	Artist	Year	Genre	Single / Pack name	Release date
"My Own Eyes"	"Weird Al" Yankovic	2014	Novelty	Single	Oct 6, 2015
"Divide"	All That Remains	2014	Metal	Single	Oct 6, 2015
"What If I Was Nothing"	All That Remains	2012	Metal	Single	Oct 6, 2015
"Gimme Chocolate!!"	Babymetal	2014	Metal	Single	Oct 6, 2015
"Run for Cover"	Blitz Kids	2014	Pop-Rock	Single	Oct 6, 2015
"Throne"	Bring Me the Horizon	2015	Nu-Metal	Single	Oct 6, 2015
"Mona Lisa"	Dead Sara	2015	Alternative	Single	Oct 6, 2015
"The Reflex"	Duran Duran	1983	Pop-Rock	Single	Oct 6, 2015
"September"	Earth, Wind & Fire	1978	R&B/Soul/Funk	Single	Oct 6, 2015
"All the Rage Back Home"	Interpol	2014	Indie Rock	Single	Oct 6, 2015
"Move Over"	Janis Joplin	1971	Classic Rock	Single	Oct 6, 2015
"Jane"	Jefferson Starship	1979	Classic Rock	Single	Oct 6, 2015
"Rebellion (ft. Daron Malakian)"	Linkin Park	2014	Nu-Metal	Single	Oct 6, 2015
"The Mephistopheles of Los Angeles"	Marilyn Manson	2015	Metal	Single	Oct 6, 2015
"High Road"	Mastodon	2014	Metal	Single	Oct 6, 2015
"One Big Holiday"	My Morning Jacket	2003	Southern Rock	Single	Oct 6, 2015
"Would You Still Be There"	Of Mice & Men	2014	Nu-Metal	Single	Oct 6, 2015
"Sugar, You"	Oh Honey	2015	Indie Rock	Single	Oct 6, 2015
"Cowboys from Hell (Live from Monsters in Moscow Festival)"	Pantera	1991	Metal	Single	Oct 6, 2015
"King for a Day (ft. Kellin Quinn)"	Pierce the Veil	2012	Emo	Single	Oct 6, 2015
"Summertime Boy"	Seasick Steve	2015	Blues	Single	Oct 6, 2015
"Backwoods Company"	The Wild Feathers	2013	Southern Rock	Single	Oct 6, 2015
"Don't Wanna Fight"	Alabama Shakes	2015	Southern Rock	Single	Oct 13, 2015
"Failure"	Breaking Benjamin	2015	Rock	Single	Oct 13, 2015
"Trainwreck 1979"	Death from Above 1979	2014	Rock	Single	Oct 13, 2015
"Follow Me Down"	The Pretty Reckless	2014	Rock	Single	Oct 13, 2015
"Cryin'"	Aerosmith	1993	Rock	Aerosmith Hits 02	Oct 19, 2015
"Dude (Looks Like a Lady)"	Aerosmith	1987	Rock	Aerosmith Hits 02	Oct 19, 2015
"Eat the Rich"	Aerosmith	1993	Rock	Aerosmith Hits 02	Oct 19, 2015
"Love in an Elevator"	Aerosmith	1989	Rock	Aerosmith Hits 02	Oct 19, 2015
"Rats in the Cellar"	Aerosmith	1976	Rock	Aerosmith Hits 02	Oct 19, 2015
"Seasons of Wither"	Aerosmith	1974	Rock	Aerosmith Hits 02	Oct 19, 2015
"Always Something There to Remind Me"	Naked Eyes	1983	New Wave	Single	Oct 27, 2015
"People Are People"	Depeche Mode	1984	Pop/Dance/Electronic	Single	Oct 27, 2015
"What You Need"	INXS	1985	Pop-Rock	Single	Oct 27, 2015
"Bad Case of Loving You (Doctor, Doctor)"	Robert Palmer	1979	Pop-Rock	Single	Nov 4, 2015
"Long Cool Woman in a Black Dress"	The Hollies	1971	Classic Rock	Single	Nov 4, 2015
"Lust for Life"	Iggy Pop	1977	Rock	Single	Nov 4, 2015
"Like a Stone"	Audioslave	2002	Rock	Single	Nov 9, 2015
"Awake"	Godsmack	2000	Nu-Metal	Single	Nov 9, 2015
"Lying from You"	Linkin Park	2003	Nu-Metal	Single	Nov 9, 2015
"Bad Catholics" (Note: Song was only available as part of a special promotion.)	The Barbazons	2015	Indie Rock	Single	Nov 11, 2015
"Sing"	Ed Sheeran	2014	Pop-Rock	Single	Nov 17, 2015
"Young Blood" (Note: Song is only available bundled with "Sing" by Ed Sheeran.)	Saint Raymond	2015	Pop-Rock	Single	Nov 17, 2015
"Riptide"	Vance Joy	2013	Indie Rock	Single	Nov 17, 2015
"Shut Up and Dance"	Walk the Moon	2014	Pop-Rock	Single	Nov 17, 2015
"And The Cradle Will Rock..."	Van Halen	1980	Rock	Van Halen Hits 01	Nov 24, 2015
"Ain't Talkin' 'bout Love"	Van Halen	1978	Rock	Van Halen Hits 01	Nov 24, 2015
"Dance the Night Away"	Van Halen	1979	Rock	Van Halen Hits 01	Nov 24, 2015
"Hot for Teacher"	Van Halen	1984	Rock	Van Halen Hits 01	Nov 24, 2015
"Runnin' with the Devil"	Van Halen	1979	Rock	Van Halen Hits 01	Nov 24, 2015
"Unchained"	Van Halen	1981	Rock	Van Halen Hits 01	Nov 24, 2015
"Dreams"	Beck	2015	Alternative	Off the Charts 01	Dec 1, 2015
"Electric Love"	BØRNS	2015	Pop/Dance/Electronic	Off the Charts 01	Dec 1, 2015
"Cocoon"	Catfish and the Bottlemen	2015	Indie Rock	Off the Charts 01	Dec 1, 2015
"First"	Cold War Kids	2015	Indie Rock	Off the Charts 01	Dec 1, 2015
"Renegades"	X Ambassadors	2015	Alternative	Off the Charts 01	Dec 1, 2015
"The Coma Machine"	Between the Buried and Me	2015	Prog	Single	Dec 8, 2015
"Heir Apparent"	Opeth	2008	Prog	Single	Dec 8, 2015
"Nevermore"	Symphony X	2015	Prog	Single	Dec 8, 2015
"Ex's and Oh's"	Elle King	2015	Alternative	Off the Charts 02	Dec 15, 2015
"Can't Feel My Face"	The Weeknd	2015	Pop/Dance/Electronic	Off the Charts 02	Dec 15, 2015
"Irresistible"	Fall Out Boy	2015	Pop-Rock	Off the Charts 02	Dec 15, 2015
"Different Colors"	Walk the Moon	2015	Pop-Rock	Off the Charts 02	Dec 15, 2015
"Stitches"	Shawn Mendes	2015	Pop-Rock	Off the Charts 02	Dec 15, 2015
"Sunday Bloody Sunday"	U2	1983	Rock	U2 Essentials 01	Dec 22, 2015
"Pride (In the Name of Love)"	U2	1984	Rock	U2 Essentials 01	Dec 22, 2015
"Where the Streets Have No Name"	U2	1987	Rock	U2 Essentials 01	Dec 22, 2015
"Desire"	U2	1988	Rock	U2 Essentials 01	Dec 22, 2015
"One"	U2	1991	Rock	U2 Essentials 01	Dec 22, 2015
"Vertigo"	U2	2004	Rock	U2 Essentials 01	Dec 22, 2015
"California (There Is No End to Love)"	U2	2014	Rock	U2 Essentials 01	Dec 22, 2015
"The Miracle (Of Joey Ramone)"	U2	2014	Rock	U2 Essentials 01	Dec 22, 2015
"Adventure of a Lifetime"	Coldplay	2015	Alternative	Single	Dec 29, 2015
"Drag Me Down"	One Direction	2015	Pop/Dance/Electronic	Single	Dec 29, 2015
"Thank God for Girls"	Weezer	2015	Alternative	Single	Dec 29, 2015
"What Do You Mean?"	Justin Bieber	2015	Pop/Dance/Electronic	Single	Dec 29, 2015
"On My Mind"	Ellie Goulding	2015	Pop/Dance/Electronic	Single	Dec 29, 2015
"Leave the Night On"	Sam Hunt	2014	Country	Single	Dec 29, 2015
"Immortalized"	Disturbed	2015	Nu-Metal	Disturbed 04	Jan 12, 2016
"The Vengeful One"	Disturbed	2015	Nu-Metal	Disturbed 04	Jan 12, 2016
"Warrior"	Disturbed	2010	Nu-Metal	Disturbed 04	Jan 12, 2016
"My Wave"	Soundgarden	1994	Grunge	Single	Jan 19, 2016
"Wicked Garden"	Stone Temple Pilots	1992	Alternative	Single	Jan 19, 2016
"Hunger Strike"	Temple of the Dog	1991	Grunge	Single	Jan 19, 2016
"Get Lucky"	Daft Punk ft. Pharrell Williams	2013	Pop/Dance/Electronic	Single	Feb 2, 2016
"Heartbeat Song"	Kelly Clarkson	2015	Pop/Dance/Electronic	Single	Feb 2, 2016
"Hey Ya!"	Outkast	2003	Hip-Hop/Rap	Single	Feb 2, 2016
"Locked Out of Heaven"	Bruno Mars	2012	Pop-Rock	Single	Feb 9, 2016
"Treasure"	Bruno Mars	2012	Pop-Rock	Single	Feb 9, 2016
"Dancing with Myself"	Generation X	1981	Punk	Single	Feb 9, 2016
"Love Stinks"	The J. Geils Band	1980	Rock	Single	Feb 9, 2016
"I Hate Myself for Loving You"	Joan Jett & the Blackhearts	1988	Punk	Single	Feb 9, 2016
"Speed Fighter"	Masaya Matsuura	2014	Pop/Dance/Electronic	Single	Feb 9, 2016
"Still the One"	Orleans	1976	Rock	Single	Feb 9, 2016
"Got Your Six"	Five Finger Death Punch	2015	Metal	Single	Feb 16, 2016
"Thunder & Lightning"	Motörhead	2015	Metal	Single	Feb 16, 2016
"Figure It Out"	Royal Blood	2014	Rock	Single	Feb 16, 2016
"Chicken Fried"	Zac Brown Band	2008	Country	Zac Brown Band 01	Feb 23, 2016
"Homegrown"	Zac Brown Band	2015	Country	Zac Brown Band 01	Feb 23, 2016
"The Wind"	Zac Brown Band	2012	Country	Zac Brown Band 01	Feb 23, 2016
"Best Song Ever"	One Direction	2013	Pop/Dance/Electronic	One Direction 01	Mar 8, 2016
"Never Enough"	One Direction	2015	Pop/Dance/Electronic	One Direction 01	Mar 8, 2016
"Story of My Life"	One Direction	2013	Pop/Dance/Electronic	One Direction 01	Mar 8, 2016
"What Makes You Beautiful"	One Direction	2011	Pop/Dance/Electronic	One Direction 01	Mar 8, 2016
"Zombie"	The Cranberries	1994	Alternative	The Cranberries 01	Mar 15, 2016
"Ode to My Family"	The Cranberries	1994	Alternative	The Cranberries 01	Mar 15, 2016
"Dreams"	The Cranberries	1993	Alternative	The Cranberries 01	Mar 15, 2016
"She Looks So Perfect"	5 Seconds of Summer	2014	Pop-Rock	Off the Charts 03	Mar 22, 2016
"My Songs Know What You Did in the Dark (Light Em Up)"	Fall Out Boy	2013	Pop-Rock	Off the Charts 03	Mar 22, 2016
"Everybody Talks"	Neon Trees	2012	Pop-Rock	Off the Charts 03	Mar 22, 2016
"That's My Kind of Night"	Luke Bryan	2013	Country	Going Country 09	Mar 29, 2016
"House Party"	Sam Hunt	2014	Country	Going Country 09	Mar 29, 2016
"Blown Away"	Carrie Underwood	2012	Country	Going Country 09	Mar 29, 2016
"Day Late, Dollar Short" (Note: Song was previously included in Rock Band.)	The Acro-Brats	2006	Rock	Rock Band 4 30-Song Mega Pack	Apr 5, 2016
"Blood Doll"	Anarchy Club	2007	Rock	Rock Band 4 30-Song Mega Pack	Apr 5, 2016
"Get Clean" (Note: Song was previously included in Rock Band 2.)	Anarchy Club	2009	Metal	Rock Band 4 30-Song Mega Pack	Apr 5, 2016
"Night Lies"	Bang Camaro	2008	Rock	Rock Band 4 30-Song Mega Pack	Apr 5, 2016
"Pleasure (Pleasure)"	Bang Camaro	2007	Rock	Rock Band 4 30-Song Mega Pack	Apr 5, 2016
"Push Push, Lady Lightning"	Bang Camaro	2007	Rock	Rock Band 4 30-Song Mega Pack	Apr 5, 2016
"Lodger"	Blanks.	2009	Indie Rock	Rock Band 4 30-Song Mega Pack	Apr 5, 2016
"Shoulder to the Plow"	Breaking Wheel	2008	Metal	Rock Band 4 30-Song Mega Pack	Apr 5, 2016
"Shake" (Note: Song was previously released as DLC for Rock Band at a reduced price of 99 cents.)	Count Zero	2008	Rock	Rock Band 4 30-Song Mega Pack	Apr 5, 2016
"Can't Let Go"	Death of the Cool	2007	Rock	Rock Band 4 30-Song Mega Pack	Apr 5, 2016
"The Heist"	DnA's Evolution	2009	Rock	Rock Band 4 30-Song Mega Pack	Apr 5, 2016
"Blink"	Father Octopus	2010	Rock	Rock Band 4 30-Song Mega Pack	Apr 5, 2016
"Brainpower"	Freezepop	2007	Pop/Dance/Electronic	Rock Band 4 30-Song Mega Pack	Apr 5, 2016
"Get Ready 2 Rokk"	Freezepop	2000	Pop/Dance/Electronic	Rock Band 4 30-Song Mega Pack	Apr 5, 2016
"Less Talk More Rokk"	Freezepop	2007	Pop/Dance/Electronic	Rock Band 4 30-Song Mega Pack	Apr 5, 2016
"Sprode"	Freezepop	2003	Pop/Dance/Electronic	Rock Band 4 30-Song Mega Pack	Apr 5, 2016
"Signs"	Giant Target	2009	Punk	Rock Band 4 30-Song Mega Pack	Apr 5, 2016
"Entangled"	Honest Bob and the Factory-to-Dealer Incentives	2008	Indie Rock	Rock Band 4 30-Song Mega Pack	Apr 5, 2016
"I Get By"	Honest Bob and the Factory-to-Dealer Incentives	2007	Indie Rock	Rock Band 4 30-Song Mega Pack	Apr 5, 2016
"A Jagged Gorgeous Winter"	The Main Drag	2008	Indie Rock	Rock Band 4 30-Song Mega Pack	Apr 5, 2016
"Don't Let Me Down (Slowly)"	The Main Drag	2009	Indie Rock	Rock Band 4 30-Song Mega Pack	Apr 5, 2016
"What's Your Favorite Dinosaur?"	The Main Drag	2008	Indie Rock	Rock Band 4 30-Song Mega Pack	Apr 5, 2016
"Megasus"	Megasus	2008	Metal	Rock Band 4 30-Song Mega Pack	Apr 5, 2016
"Conventional Lover"	Speck	2007	Pop-Rock	Rock Band 4 30-Song Mega Pack	Apr 5, 2016
"Synthesized"	Symbion Project	2003	Pop/Dance/Electronic	Rock Band 4 30-Song Mega Pack	Apr 5, 2016
"Rob the Prez-O-Dent"	That Handsome Devil	2008	Rock	Rock Band 4 30-Song Mega Pack	Apr 5, 2016
"No Mercy"	Tijuana Sweetheart	2009	Punk	Rock Band 4 30-Song Mega Pack	Apr 5, 2016
"Seven"	Tijuana Sweetheart	2007	Punk	Rock Band 4 30-Song Mega Pack	Apr 5, 2016
"Trash Candy"	Tijuana Sweetheart	2009	Punk	Rock Band 4 30-Song Mega Pack	Apr 5, 2016
"Outside"	Tribe	1989	Rock	Rock Band 4 30-Song Mega Pack	Apr 5, 2016
"Cake by the Ocean"	DNCE	2015	Pop-Rock	Off the Charts 04	Apr 11, 2016
"Stressed Out" (Note: Song later included in the pack Twenty One Pilots 01.)	Twenty One Pilots	2015	Alternative	Off the Charts 04	Apr 11, 2016
"The Hills"	The Weeknd	2015	Pop/Dance/Electronic	Off the Charts 04	Apr 11, 2016
"Sorry"	Justin Bieber	2015	Pop/Dance/Electronic	Justin Bieber 01	Apr 19, 2016
"Boyfriend"	Justin Bieber	2012	Pop/Dance/Electronic	Justin Bieber 01	Apr 19, 2016
"Love Yourself"	Justin Bieber	2015	Pop/Dance/Electronic	Justin Bieber 01	Apr 19, 2016
"Redneck"	Lamb of God	2006	Metal	Single	Apr 26, 2016
"What I Like About You"	The Romantics	1980	Pop-Rock	Single	Apr 26, 2016
"Dope Nose"	Weezer	2002	Alternative	Single	Apr 26, 2016
"Don't Do Me Like That"	Tom Petty and the Heartbreakers	1979	Rock	Single	May 10, 2016
"Learning to Fly"	Tom Petty and the Heartbreakers	1991	Rock	Single	May 10, 2016
"Breakfast at Tiffany's"	Deep Blue Something	1995	Alternative	Single	May 17, 2016
"Take Me to Church"	Hozier	2014	Indie Rock	Single	May 17, 2016
"Hey Jealousy"	Gin Blossoms	1993	Alternative	Single	May 24, 2016
"Found Out About You"	Gin Blossoms	1993	Alternative	Single	May 24, 2016
"We're Not Gonna Take It"	Twisted Sister	1984	Glam	Single	May 31, 2016
"Cherry Pie"	Warrant	1990	Metal	Single	May 31, 2016
"Hook"	Blues Traveler	1994	Rock	Single	Jun 7, 2016
"Famous Last Words"	My Chemical Romance	2006	Emo	Single	Jun 7, 2016
"Rude"	Magic!	2014	Pop-Rock	Single	Jun 14, 2016
"Iris"	Goo Goo Dolls	1998	Alternative	Single	Jun 14, 2016
"Radioactive"	Imagine Dragons	2012	Alternative	Single	Jun 21, 2016
"Never Too Late"	Three Days Grace	2006	Rock	Single	Jun 21, 2016
"Africa"	Toto	1982	Pop-Rock	Single	Jun 28, 2016
"All These Things That I've Done"	The Killers	2004	Alternative	Single	Jun 28, 2016
"Lips of an Angel"	Hinder	2005	Rock	Single	Jul 5, 2016
"Where Is My Mind?"	Pixies	1988	Alternative	Single	Jul 5, 2016
"Rock This Town"	Brian Setzer	2007	Rock	Single	Jul 12, 2016
"Jumper"	Third Eye Blind	1997	Alternative	Single	Jul 12, 2016
"Uptown Girl"	Billy Joel	1983	Classic Rock	Single	Jul 19, 2016
"Hemorrhage (In My Hands)"	Fuel	2000	Rock	Single	Jul 19, 2016
"Pompeii"	Bastille	2013	Indie Rock	Single	Jul 26, 2016
"I Gotta Feeling"	The Black Eyed Peas	2009	Pop/Dance/Electronic	Single	Jul 26, 2016
"Blurred Lines"	Robin Thicke ft. Pharrell	2013	R&B/Soul/Funk	Single	Aug 2, 2016
"Mr. Jones"	Counting Crows	1993	Alternative	Single	Aug 2, 2016
"Heaven Is a Place on Earth"	Belinda Carlisle	1987	Pop-Rock	Single	Aug 9, 2016
"Bad Catholics" (Note: Track was previously only available as part of a special promotion.)	The Barbazons	2015	Indie Rock	Single	Aug 9, 2016
"If You Could Only See"	Tonic	1996	Alternative	Single	Aug 16, 2016
"Everything You Want"	Vertical Horizon	1999	Alternative	Single	Aug 16, 2016
"I'm Yours"	Jason Mraz	2008	Pop-Rock	Single	Aug 23, 2016
"Starships"	Nicki Minaj	2012	Pop/Dance/Electronic	Single	Aug 23, 2016
"What About Love"	Heart	1985	Classic Rock	Single	Aug 30, 2016
"Seventeen"	Winger	1988	Glam	Single	Aug 30, 2016
"Wrong Side of Heaven"	Five Finger Death Punch	2013	Metal	Single	Sep 6, 2016
"Lifestyles of the Rich and Famous"	Good Charlotte	2002	Punk	Single	Sep 6, 2016
"Dirt Road Anthem"	Jason Aldean	2010	Country	Single	Sep 13, 2016
"All for You"	Sister Hazel	1997	Alternative	Single	Sep 13, 2016
"Dystopia"	Megadeth	2016	Metal	Ozzfest meets Knotfest 2016	Sep 20, 2016
"Road to Nowhere"	Ozzy Osbourne	1991	Metal	Ozzfest meets Knotfest 2016	Sep 20, 2016
"The Devil in I"	Slipknot	2014	Nu-Metal	Ozzfest meets Knotfest 2016	Sep 20, 2016
"HandClap"	Fitz and the Tantrums	2016	Pop-Rock	Single	Sep 27, 2016
"The Sound of Silence"	Disturbed	2015	Nu-Metal	Single	Sep 27, 2016
"Flagpole Sitta"	Harvey Danger	1997	Alternative	Single	Oct 4, 2016
"Stop"	Jane's Addiction	1990	Alternative	Single	Oct 4, 2016
"Honey, I'm Good."	Andy Grammer	2014	Pop-Rock	Single	Oct 11, 2016
"Treat You Better"	Shawn Mendes	2016	Pop-Rock	Single	Oct 11, 2016
"Happy Song"	Bring Me the Horizon	2015	Nu-Metal	Rock Band Rivals Launch Pack	Oct 18, 2016
"Safe and Sound"	Capital Cities	2013	Pop/Dance/Electronic	Rock Band Rivals Launch Pack	Oct 18, 2016
"Save Tonight"	Eagle-Eye Cherry	1997	Alternative	Rock Band Rivals Launch Pack	Oct 18, 2016
"Happy"	Pharrell Williams	2014	Pop/Dance/Electronic	Rock Band Rivals Launch Pack	Oct 18, 2016
"Sweater Weather"	The Neighbourhood	2013	Indie Rock	Rock Band Rivals Launch Pack	Oct 18, 2016
"Little Talks"	Of Monsters and Men	2011	Indie Rock	Rock Band Rivals Launch Pack	Oct 18, 2016
"Closing Time"	Semisonic	1998	Alternative	Rock Band Rivals Launch Pack	Oct 18, 2016
"Chandelier"	Sia	2014	Pop/Dance/Electronic	Rock Band Rivals Launch Pack	Oct 18, 2016
"Feel Invincible"	Skillet	2016	Rock	Rock Band Rivals Launch Pack	Oct 18, 2016
"King of the World"	Weezer	2016	Alternative	Rock Band Rivals Launch Pack	Oct 18, 2016
"One More Night"	Maroon 5	2012	Pop-Rock	Single	Oct 25, 2016
"3AM"	Matchbox Twenty	1996	Alternative	Single	Oct 25, 2016
"Closer"	The Chainsmokers ft. Halsey	2016	Pop/Dance/Electronic	Single	Oct 27, 2016
"Cheap Thrills"	Sia ft. Sean Paul	2016	Pop/Dance/Electronic	Single	Oct 27, 2016
"Hold My Hand"	Hootie & the Blowfish	1994	Alternative	Hootie & the Blowfish 01	Nov 1, 2016
"Only Wanna Be with You"	Hootie & the Blowfish	1994	Alternative	Hootie & the Blowfish 01	Nov 1, 2016
"Let Her Cry"	Hootie & the Blowfish	1994	Alternative	Hootie & the Blowfish 01	Nov 1, 2016
"Born Again Tomorrow"	Bon Jovi	2016	Rock	Single	Nov 3, 2016
"Lovesong"	The Cure	1989	New Wave	Single	Nov 10, 2016
"Time After Time"	Cyndi Lauper	1983	Pop-Rock	Single	Nov 10, 2016
"She Drives Me Crazy"	Fine Young Cannibals	1989	New Wave	Single	Nov 10, 2016
"Complicated"	Avril Lavigne	2002	Pop-Rock	Avril Lavigne 01	Nov 17, 2016
"My Happy Ending"	Avril Lavigne	2004	Pop-Rock	Avril Lavigne 01	Nov 17, 2016
"What the Hell"	Avril Lavigne	2011	Pop-Rock	Avril Lavigne 01	Nov 17, 2016
"24K Magic"	Bruno Mars	2016	Pop-Rock	Single	Nov 22, 2016
"Hymn for the Weekend"	Coldplay	2016	Alternative	Single	Nov 22, 2016
"Still Breathing"	Green Day	2016	Rock	Single	Nov 22, 2016
"Starboy"	The Weeknd ft. Daft Punk	2016	Pop/Dance/Electronic	Single	Dec 1, 2016
"Waste a Moment"	Kings of Leon	2016	Rock	Single	Dec 1, 2016
"Chop Suey!"	System of a Down	2001	Nu-Metal	Single	Dec 1, 2016
"Heathens"	Twenty One Pilots	2016	Alternative	Twenty One Pilots 01	Dec 8, 2016
"Ride"	Twenty One Pilots	2015	Alternative	Twenty One Pilots 01	Dec 8, 2016
"Shadow" (Note: Song is exclusively available through the December update to Rock Band Rivals.)	Bearstronaut	2016	Pop-Rock	Single	Dec 14, 2016
"Bethany"	Goddamn Draculas	2015	Rock	Single	Dec 14, 2016
"Black Streak"	Nemes	2014	Indie Rock	Single	Dec 14, 2016
"I Recognize"	Newfane	2016	Alternative	Single	Dec 14, 2016
"Never Let 'Em Hold Ya Back!"	Parlour Bells	2016	Glam	Single	Dec 14, 2016
"True Confessional"	Party Bois	2016	Pop/Dance/Electronic	Single	Dec 14, 2016
"Mean Girls"	Petty Morals	2016	Pop-Rock	Single	Dec 14, 2016
"Hour of Rats"	The Red Chord	2009	Metal	Single	Dec 14, 2016
"Pain Killer"	Ruby Rose Fox	2016	Indie Rock	Single	Dec 14, 2016
"Closer, Closer"	The Warning Shots	2016	Punk	Single	Dec 14, 2016
"Constant Disaster"	When Particles Collide	2014	Alternative	Single	Dec 14, 2016
"Black Corridor"	Worshipper	2016	Metal	Single	Dec 14, 2016
"Royals"	Lorde	2013	Pop/Dance/Electronic	Off the Charts 05	Dec 15, 2016
"All About That Bass"	Meghan Trainor	2014	Pop/Dance/Electronic	Off the Charts 05	Dec 15, 2016
"The Greatest"	Sia ft. Kendrick Lamar	2016	Pop/Dance/Electronic	Off the Charts 05	Dec 15, 2016
"Angel"	Aerosmith	1987	Rock	Aerosmith Hits 03	Dec 22, 2016
"Crazy"	Aerosmith	1993	Rock	Aerosmith Hits 03	Dec 22, 2016
"I Don't Want to Miss a Thing"	Aerosmith	1998	Rock	Aerosmith Hits 03	Dec 22, 2016
"Janie's Got a Gun"	Aerosmith	1989	Rock	Aerosmith Hits 03	Dec 22, 2016
"Livin' on the Edge"	Aerosmith	1993	Rock	Aerosmith Hits 03	Dec 22, 2016
"Rag Doll"	Aerosmith	1987	Rock	Aerosmith Hits 03	Dec 22, 2016
"Wake Me Up"	Avicii	2013	Pop/Dance/Electronic	New Year's Eve 2016	Dec 29, 2016
"Celebration"	Kool & the Gang	1980	R&B/Soul/Funk	New Year's Eve 2016	Dec 29, 2016
"Party Rock Anthem"	LMFAO ft. Lauren Bennett & GoonRock	2011	Pop/Dance/Electronic	New Year's Eve 2016	Dec 29, 2016
"The Stage"	Avenged Sevenfold	2016	Metal	More Metal 01	Jan 5, 2017
"Trust"	Megadeth	1997	Metal	More Metal 01	Jan 5, 2017
"Dead Memories"	Slipknot	2008	Nu-Metal	More Metal 01	Jan 5, 2017
"Swing, Swing" (Note: Song was previously included in Lego Rock Band.)	The All-American Rejects	2003	Emo	Single	Jan 12, 2017
"Some Nights"	fun.	2012	Pop-Rock	Single	Jan 12, 2017
"Cheerleader (Felix Jaehn Remix)"	OMI	2015	Pop/Dance/Electronic	Single	Jan 12, 2017
"Hold the Line"	Toto	1978	Pop-Rock	Solid '70s 01	Jan 19, 2017
"Carry On Wayward Son"	Kansas	1976	Prog	Solid '70s 01	Jan 19, 2017
"(Don't Fear) The Reaper"	Blue Öyster Cult	1976	Classic Rock	Solid '70s 01	Jan 19, 2017
"S.O.M.P." (Note: Song is exclusively available through the January update to Rock Band Rivals.)	Skratch'N Snyf	1990	Glam	Single	Jan 25, 2017
"Applause"	Lady Gaga	2013	Pop/Dance/Electronic	Lady Gaga 03	Jan 26, 2017
"A-YO"	Lady Gaga	2016	Pop/Dance/Electronic	Lady Gaga 03	Jan 26, 2017
"The Edge of Glory"	Lady Gaga	2011	Pop/Dance/Electronic	Lady Gaga 03	Jan 26, 2017
"I Wanna Rock"	Twisted Sister	1984	Glam	Single	Feb 2, 2017
"Round and Round"	Ratt	1984	Glam	Single	Feb 2, 2017
"I Will Survive"	Cake	1996	Alternative	Pack à Trois	Feb 9, 2017
"Want to Want Me"	Jason Derulo	2015	Pop/Dance/Electronic	Pack à Trois	Feb 9, 2017
"Don't You (Forget About Me)"	Simple Minds	1985	New Wave	Pack à Trois	Feb 9, 2017
"Nine in the Afternoon"	Panic! at the Disco	2008	Emo	Single	Feb 16, 2017
"In Too Deep"	Sum 41	2001	Punk	Single	Feb 16, 2017
"Ace of Spades '08"	Motörhead	1980	Metal	Single	Feb 23, 2017
"Black Betty"	Ram Jam	1977	Classic Rock	Single	Feb 23, 2017
"My Own Worst Enemy"	Lit	1999	Pop-Rock	Single	Mar 2, 2017
"Outside"	Staind	2001	Nu-Metal	Single	Mar 2, 2017
"That's What You Get"	Paramore	2007	Pop-Rock	Single	Mar 9, 2017
"Can't Hold Us"	Macklemore & Ryan Lewis ft. Ray Dalton	2012	Hip-Hop/Rap	Single	Mar 9, 2017
"Danger Zone"	Kenny Loggins	1986	Pop-Rock	Single	Mar 16, 2017
"Sink" (Note: Song is exclusively available through the March update to Rock Band Rivals.)	Animal Flag	2016	Indie Rock	Single	Mar 16, 2017
"These Hands"	Bent Knee	2016	Indie Rock	Single	Mar 16, 2017
"No Place for Me"	Black Beach	2016	Rock	Single	Mar 16, 2017
"History Repeats"	Creaturos	2016	Rock	Single	Mar 16, 2017
"RudeBoys"	Dutch ReBelle	2016	Hip-Hop/Rap	Single	Mar 16, 2017
"Hurry Up (& Wait for You)"	Julie Rhodes	2016	Indie Rock	Single	Mar 16, 2017
"Casablanca"	Littlefoot	2016	Pop-Rock	Single	Mar 16, 2017
"Cross That Line"	Michael Christmas	2016	Hip-Hop/Rap	Single	Mar 16, 2017
"Skydiver"	Ruby Rose Fox	2016	Indie Rock	Single	Mar 16, 2017
"Good"	STL GLD	2016	Hip-Hop/Rap	Single	Mar 16, 2017
"Alone Time"	Tigerman WOAH	2016	Rock	Single	Mar 16, 2017
"Use Somebody"	Kings of Leon	2008	Rock	Single	Mar 23, 2017
"I Will Wait"	Mumford & Sons	2012	Rock	Single	Mar 23, 2017
"Counting Stars"	OneRepublic	2013	Pop-Rock	Single	Mar 23, 2017
"Promise Everything"	Basement	2016	Alternative	Single	Mar 30, 2017
"Shape of You"	Ed Sheeran	2017	Pop-Rock	Single	Mar 30, 2017
"One Way or Another"	Blondie	1978	Pop-Rock	Single	Apr 6, 2017
"You Make My Dreams"	Hall & Oates	1980	Pop-Rock	Single	Apr 6, 2017
"Glass House"	Kaleo	2016	Rock	Single	Apr 13, 2017
"Bizarre Love Triangle"	New Order	1986	New Wave	Single	Apr 13, 2017
"Free Bird" (Note: Song was previously included in Rock Band 3.)	Lynyrd Skynyrd	1973	Southern Rock	Single	Apr 20, 2017
"Champagne Supernova"	Oasis	1995	Rock	Single	Apr 20, 2017
"Beast and the Harlot"	Avenged Sevenfold	2005	Metal	Single	Apr 27, 2017
"Heaven Knows"	The Pretty Reckless	2014	Rock	Single	Apr 27, 2017
"This Is How We Do It"	Montell Jordan	1995	Hip-Hop/Rap	Single	May 4, 2017
"Kids"	MGMT	2007	Pop/Dance/Electronic	Single	May 11, 2017
"Mother Mother"	Tracy Bonham	1996	Alternative	Single	May 11, 2017
"Shout"	The Isley Brothers	1959	R&B/Soul/Funk	Single	May 18, 2017
"Bored to Death"	Blink-182	2016	Punk	Single	May 25, 2017
"You & Me"	The Hunna	2016	Indie Rock	Single	May 25, 2017
"Pull Me Under"	Dream Theater	1992	Prog	Single	Jun 8, 2017
"Circles"	Pierce the Veil	2016	Emo	Single	Jun 8, 2017
"Killing Is Just a Means"	Permaband	2014	Rock	Single	Jun 15, 2017
"Wrecking Machine"	Permaband	2016	Rock	Single	Jun 15, 2017
"Girls Just Want to Have Fun"	Cyndi Lauper	1983	Pop-Rock	Single	Jun 22, 2017
"Ain't It Fun"	Paramore	2013	Pop-Rock	Single	Jun 22, 2017
"Go Your Own Way"	Fleetwood Mac	1977	Classic Rock	Single	Jun 29, 2017
"Freewill" (Vault Edition)	Rush	1980	Prog	Single	Jun 29, 2017
"Down with the Sickness"	Disturbed	2000	Nu-Metal	Single	Jul 6, 2017
"Cirice"	Ghost	2015	Metal	Single	Jul 6, 2017
"In-A-Gadda-Da-Vida"	Iron Butterfly	1968	Classic Rock	Single	Jul 13, 2017
"She"	Legitimate Front	2012	R&B/Soul/Funk	Single	Jul 18, 2017
"Gold on the Ceiling"	The Black Keys	2011	Rock	Single	Jul 20, 2017
"Hold On"	Wilson Phillips	1990	Pop-Rock	Single	Jul 20, 2017
"Alive"	The Temper Trap	2016	Indie Rock	Single	Jul 27, 2017
"Testify"	Rage Against the Machine	1999	Alternative	Single	Jul 27, 2017
"True Confessions"	Blondfire	2016	Indie Rock	Single	Aug 3, 2017
"Rebel Heart"	The Shelters	2016	Rock	Single	Aug 3, 2017
"Sweater Weather" (Note: Song is exclusively available to Rock Band Rivals owners.)	Parks	2012	Pop-Rock	Single	Aug 10, 2017
"To My Romeo"	Spirit Kid	2016	Pop-Rock	Single	Aug 10, 2017
"Black Seas"	Arctic Horror	2016	Metal	Single	Aug 17, 2017
"(You're) Breakin' Up"	The Black Cheers	2015	Punk	Single	Aug 17, 2017
"Stupid Girl"	Garbage	1995	Alternative	Single	Aug 24, 2017
"Every Morning"	Sugar Ray	1999	Alternative	Single	Aug 24, 2017
"Postpone"	Catfish and the Bottlemen	2016	Indie Rock	Single	Aug 31, 2017
"Stranglehold"	Ted Nugent	1975	Classic Rock	Single	Aug 31, 2017
"Ice Ice Baby"	Vanilla Ice	1990	Hip-Hop/Rap	Single	Sep 7, 2017
"I Wanna Dance with Somebody (Who Loves Me)"	Whitney Houston	1987	Pop/Dance/Electronic	Single	Sep 7, 2017
"Won't Get Fooled Again"	The Who	1971	Classic Rock	Single	Sep 14, 2017
"God Damn"	Avenged Sevenfold	2016	Metal	Single	Sep 14, 2017
"Super Freak"	Rick James	1981	R&B/Soul/Funk	Single	Sep 21, 2017
"Float"	Switchfoot	2016	Alternative	Single	Sep 21, 2017
"Burnin' for You"	Blue Öyster Cult	1981	Classic Rock	Single	Sep 28, 2017
"There's Nothing Holdin' Me Back"	Shawn Mendes	2016	Pop-Rock	Single	Sep 28, 2017
"Heat of the Moment"	Asia	1982	Classic Rock	Single	Oct 5, 2017
"Eye of the Tiger"	Survivor	1982	Rock	Single	Oct 5, 2017
"Down in a Hole"	Alice in Chains	1992	Grunge	Alice in Chains 03	Oct 12, 2017
"Man in the Box"	Alice in Chains	1990	Grunge	Alice in Chains 03	Oct 12, 2017
"Them Bones"	Alice in Chains	1992	Grunge	Alice in Chains 03	Oct 12, 2017
"Johnny B. Goode"	Chuck Berry	1959	Classic Rock	Single	Oct 26, 2017
"I Want You Back"	The Jackson 5	1969	Pop-Rock	Single	Oct 26, 2017
"Slow Ride"	Foghat	1975	Classic Rock	Solid '70s 02	Nov 2, 2017
"I Wanna Be Sedated"	Ramones	1978	Punk	Solid '70s 02	Nov 2, 2017
"Play That Funky Music"	Wild Cherry	1976	R&B/Soul/Funk	Solid '70s 02	Nov 2, 2017
"Super Beat Sports Big Baos Battle"	Steve Pardo	2017	Novelty	Single	Nov 7, 2017
"Bad Reputation"	Joan Jett	1980	Punk	Single	Nov 9, 2017
"Blister in the Sun"	Violent Femmes	1983	Punk	Single	Nov 9, 2017
"The Sign"	Ace of Base	1993	Pop/Dance/Electronic	Back to the '90s 01	Nov 16, 2017
"Karma Police"	Radiohead	1997	Alternative	Back to the '90s 01	Nov 16, 2017
"Say It Ain't So"	Weezer	1994	Alternative	Back to the '90s 01	Nov 16, 2017
"Hair Trigger" (Note: Song was previously released as part of the Rock Band Network.)	The Acro-Brats	2010	Punk	Rock Band 10th Anniversary Pack	Nov 20, 2017
"Collide"	Anarchy Club	2007	Metal	Rock Band 10th Anniversary Pack	Nov 20, 2017
"Blood Red Rock"	Bang Camaro	2008	Rock	Rock Band 10th Anniversary Pack	Nov 20, 2017
"Shadowbang (Head)"	Bang on a Can All-Stars	2003	Other	Rock Band 10th Anniversary Pack	Nov 20, 2017
"Thug Love"	Dance for the Dying	2011	Pop-Rock	Rock Band 10th Anniversary Pack	Nov 20, 2017
"Doppelgänger"	Freezepop	2010	Pop/Dance/Electronic	Rock Band 10th Anniversary Pack	Nov 20, 2017
"Cheat on the Church"	Graveyard BBQ	2005	Metal	Rock Band 10th Anniversary Pack	Nov 20, 2017
"Soy Bomb"	Honest Bob and the Factory-to-Dealer Incentives	2008	Indie Rock	Rock Band 10th Anniversary Pack	Nov 20, 2017
"How We'd Look On Paper"	The Main Drag	2007	Indie Rock	Rock Band 10th Anniversary Pack	Nov 20, 2017
"Exploited & Exposed"	Symbion Project	2010	Pop/Dance/Electronic	Rock Band 10th Anniversary Pack	Nov 20, 2017
"Save a Horse (Ride a Cowboy)"	Big & Rich	2004	Country	Single	Nov 21, 2017
"The Middle"	Jimmy Eat World	2001	Pop-Rock	Single	Nov 21, 2017
"Twilight of the Thunder God"	Amon Amarth	2008	Metal	Single	Nov 30, 2017
"When You Were Young"	The Killers	2006	Alternative	Single	Nov 30, 2017
"Run"	Foo Fighters	2017	Alternative	Rock the Charts 01	Dec 7, 2017
"Song #3"	Stone Sour	2017	Metal	Rock the Charts 01	Dec 7, 2017
"The Way You Used to Do"	Queens of the Stone Age	2017	Alternative	Rock the Charts 01	Dec 7, 2017
"Attention"	Charlie Puth	2017	Pop-Rock	Off the Charts 06	Dec 14, 2017
"Sorry Not Sorry"	Demi Lovato	2017	Pop/Dance/Electronic	Off the Charts 06	Dec 14, 2017
"Thunder"	Imagine Dragons	2017	Alternative	Off the Charts 06	Dec 14, 2017
"Feel It Still"	Portugal. The Man	2017	Alternative	Off the Charts 06	Dec 14, 2017
"Suffragette City"	David Bowie	1972	Glam	Single	Dec 21, 2017
"Everlong"	Foo Fighters	1997	Alternative	Single	Dec 21, 2017
"18 and Life"	Skid Row	1989	Glam	Single	Dec 21, 2017
"Plush"	Stone Temple Pilots	1992	Alternative	Single	Dec 21, 2017
"Come On Eileen"	Dexys Midnight Runners	1982	New Wave	New Year's Eve 2017	Dec 28, 2017
"Hooked on a Feeling"	Blue Swede	1974	Classic Rock	New Year's Eve 2017	Dec 28, 2017
"The Final Countdown"	Europe	1986	Glam	New Year's Eve 2017	Dec 28, 2017
"Enjoy the Silence"	Depeche Mode	1990	Pop/Dance/Electronic	Single	Jan 4, 2018
"We Got the Beat"	The Go-Go's	1981	Pop-Rock	Single	Jan 4, 2018
"Torn"	Natalie Imbruglia	1997	Pop-Rock	Single	Jan 4, 2018
"Open Water"	Assuming We Survive	2016	Rock	Discover LA: KROQ Locals Only	Jan 9, 2018
"Shy"	HUNNY	2017	Indie Rock	Discover LA: KROQ Locals Only	Jan 9, 2018
"Bloodhands (Oh My Fever)"	In the Valley Below	2017	Indie Rock	Discover LA: KROQ Locals Only	Jan 9, 2018
"Who's Your Lover"	Nightmare Air	2017	Indie Rock	Discover LA: KROQ Locals Only	Jan 9, 2018
"Radio"	No Small Children	2017	Rock	Discover LA: KROQ Locals Only	Jan 9, 2018
"I Remember You"	Skid Row	1989	Glam	Single	Jan 11, 2018
"Here I Go Again"	Whitesnake	1987	Glam	Single	Jan 11, 2018
"Burnin' It Down"	Jason Aldean	2014	Country	Going Country 10	Jan 18, 2018
"Body Like a Back Road"	Sam Hunt	2017	Country	Going Country 10	Jan 18, 2018
"That Don't Impress Me Much"	Shania Twain	1997	Country	Going Country 10	Jan 18, 2018
"Lonely Is the Night"	Billy Squier	1981	Classic Rock	Single	Jan 25, 2018
"Takin' Care of Business"	Bachman–Turner Overdrive	1974	Classic Rock	Single	Jan 25, 2018
"A Sky Full of Stars"	Coldplay	2014	Alternative	Single	Feb 1, 2018
"Live in the Moment"	Portugal. The Man	2017	Alternative	Single	Feb 1, 2018
"Absolutely (Story of a Girl)"	Nine Days	2000	Alternative	Single	Feb 8, 2018
"Brick House"	Commodores	1977	R&B/Soul/Funk	Single	Feb 8, 2018
"Slide"	Goo Goo Dolls	1998	Alternative	Single	Feb 15, 2018
"Unwell"	Matchbox Twenty	2002	Alternative	Single	Feb 15, 2018
"I Don't Want to Be"	Gavin DeGraw	2003	Pop-Rock	Single	Feb 22, 2018
"Broken"	Seether ft. Amy Lee	2004	Rock	Single	Feb 22, 2018
"Believer"	Imagine Dragons	2017	Alternative	Single	Mar 1, 2018
"Two Princes"	Spin Doctors	1993	Alternative	Single	Mar 1, 2018
"All You Wanted"	Michelle Branch	2001	Alternative	Single	Mar 8, 2018
"Unwritten"	Natasha Bedingfield	2004	Pop-Rock	Single	Mar 8, 2018
"Bad Company"	Bad Company	1974	Classic Rock	Single	Mar 15, 2018
"Roll to Me"	Del Amitri	1995	Alternative	Single	Mar 15, 2018
"Is She Really Going Out with Him?"	Joe Jackson	1978	Classic Rock	Single	Mar 22, 2018
"Cumbersome"	Seven Mary Three	1995	Alternative	Single	Mar 22, 2018
"Stolen Dance"	Milky Chance	2013	Alternative	Single	Mar 29, 2018
"I Want You"	Savage Garden	1997	Pop-Rock	Single	Mar 29, 2018
"Run-Around"	Blues Traveler	1994	Rock	Single	Apr 5, 2018
"Steal My Sunshine"	Len	1999	Alternative	Single	Apr 5, 2018
"Torn in Two"	Breaking Benjamin	2018	Rock	Single	Apr 12, 2018
"The Heart from Your Hate"	Trivium	2017	Metal	Single	Apr 12, 2018
"Karma Chameleon"	Culture Club	1983	New Wave	Single	Apr 19, 2018
"Pictures of Matchstick Men"	Status Quo	1968	Classic Rock	Single	Apr 19, 2018
"We Are Family"	Sister Sledge	1979	R&B/Soul/Funk	Single	Apr 26, 2018
"Right Here, Right Now"	Jesus Jones	1991	Alternative	Single	Apr 26, 2018
"Forget About Tomorrow"	The Bergamot	2016	Alternative	Discover: ReverbNation and Firefly Music Festival	May 3, 2018
"I Hear the Dead"	Dolly Spartans	2017	Alternative	Discover: ReverbNation and Firefly Music Festival	May 3, 2018
"Body Like That"	The Eiffels	2018	Alternative	Discover: ReverbNation and Firefly Music Festival	May 3, 2018
"Vinyl"	Fly By Midnight	2018	Pop/Dance/Electronic	Discover: ReverbNation and Firefly Music Festival	May 3, 2018
"Shame"	Jocelyn & Chris Arndt	2016	Rock	Discover: ReverbNation and Firefly Music Festival	May 3, 2018
"Hungry Like the Wolf"	Duran Duran	1982	New Wave	Single	May 10, 2018
"Creep"	Radiohead	1993	Alternative	Single	May 10, 2018
"Reptilia"	The Strokes	2003	Rock	Single	May 17, 2018
"Survive"	The Warning	2017	Rock	Single	May 17, 2018
"Bodies"	Drowning Pool	2001	Rock	Single	May 24, 2018
"Higher"	Creed	1999	Rock	Single	May 24, 2018
"Going Under"	Evanescence	2003	Nu-Metal	Single	May 31, 2018
"If It Means a Lot to You"	A Day to Remember	2009	Rock	Single	May 31, 2018
"A Prophecy"	Asking Alexandria	2009	Metal	Single	Jun 7, 2018
"Country Song"	Seether	2011	Rock	Single	Jun 7, 2018
"Airbrushed"	Anamanaguchi	2010	Pop/Dance/Electronic	Single	Jun 14, 2018
"Code Monkey"	Jonathan Coulton	2006	Pop-Rock	Single	Jun 14, 2018
"Hey Baby, Here's That Song You Wanted"	Blessthefall	2009	Rock	Single	Jun 21, 2018
"Relentless Chaos"	Miss May I	2010	Metal	Single	Jun 21, 2018
"Drunken Lullabies (Live)"	Flogging Molly	2010	Alternative	Single	Jun 28, 2018
"Bullet with a Name"	Nonpoint	2005	Rock	Single	Jun 28, 2018
"Reminiscing"	Little River Band	1978	Classic Rock	Yacht Rock 01	Jul 3, 2018
"Brandy (You're a Fine Girl)"	Looking Glass	1972	Classic Rock	Yacht Rock 01	Jul 3, 2018
"Baby Come Back"	Player	1977	Classic Rock	Yacht Rock 01	Jul 3, 2018
"Burn It Down"	Five Finger Death Punch	2009	Metal	Single	Jul 12, 2018
"Hard to See"	Five Finger Death Punch	2009	Metal	Single	Jul 12, 2018
"All I Want"	A Day to Remember	2010	Punk	Single	Jul 19, 2018
"I'm Made of Wax, Larry, What Are You Made Of?"	A Day to Remember	2009	Punk	Single	Jul 19, 2018
"Fake It"	Seether	2007	Rock	Single	Jul 19, 2018
"Rise Above This"	Seether	2007	Rock	Single	Jul 19, 2018
"Rescue Me"	30 Seconds to Mars	2018	Rock	Single	Jul 26, 2018
"Kamikaze"	Walk the Moon	2017	Pop-Rock	Single	Jul 26, 2018
"Give Yourself a Try"	The 1975	2018	Alternative	Single	Aug 2, 2018
"Youngblood"	5 Seconds of Summer	2018	Pop-Rock	Single	Aug 2, 2018
"This Will Be the Day"	Jeff Williams ft. Casey Lee Williams	2013	Rock	Single	Aug 9, 2018
"The Touch"	Stan Bush	2007	Rock	Single	Aug 9, 2018
"Pac-Man Fever"	Buckner & Garcia	1999	Novelty	Single	Aug 16, 2018
"Tastes Like Kevin Bacon"	iwrestledabearonce	2009	Metal	Single	Aug 16, 2018
"BEER!!"	Psychostick	2003	Metal	Single	Aug 16, 2018
"Broken"	lovelytheband	2017	Alternative	Single	Aug 23, 2018
"Sober Up"	AJR ft. Rivers Cuomo	2017	Pop-Rock	Single	Aug 23, 2018
"River of Tuoni"	Amberian Dawn	2006	Metal	Single	Aug 30, 2018
"Knifeman"	The Bronx	2008	Punk	Single	Aug 30, 2018
"American Dream"	Silverstein	2009	Rock	Single	Aug 30, 2018
"Escape (The Piña Colada Song)"	Rupert Holmes	1979	Pop-Rock	Single	Sep 6, 2018
"Red Red Wine"	UB40	1983	Reggae/Ska	Single	Sep 6, 2018
"Pictures of Girls"	Wallows	2018	Alternative	Single	Sep 13, 2018
"Simplify"	Young the Giant	2018	Alternative	Single	Sep 13, 2018
"Dogs Can Grow Beards All Over"	The Devil Wears Prada	2006	Metal	Single	Sep 20, 2018
"HTML Rulez D00d"	The Devil Wears Prada	2007	Metal	Single	Sep 20, 2018
"Jamie All Over"	Mayday Parade	2009	Rock	Single	Sep 20, 2018
"When I Get Home You're So Dead"	Mayday Parade	2009	Rock	Single	Sep 20, 2018
"Unheavenly Creatures"	Coheed and Cambria	2018	Prog	Single	Sep 27, 2018
"When the Curtain Falls"	Greta Van Fleet	2018	Rock	Single	Sep 27, 2018
"Business Time"	Flight of the Conchords	2008	Novelty	Single	Oct 4, 2018
"The Most Beautiful Girl (In the Room)"	Flight of the Conchords	2008	Novelty	Single	Oct 4, 2018
"Graffiti"	Chvrches	2018	Alternative	Single	Oct 11, 2018
"Uncomfortable"	Halestorm	2018	Rock	Single	Oct 11, 2018
"Back to Me"	Of Mice & Men	2018	Metal	Of Mice & Men 01	Oct 18, 2018
"Second & Sebring"	Of Mice & Men	2010	Metal	Of Mice & Men 01	Oct 18, 2018
"Those in Glass Houses"	Of Mice & Men	2010	Metal	Of Mice & Men 01	Oct 18, 2018
"Three Lives"	Octavision	2016	Prog	Single	Oct 25, 2018
"My Demons"	Starset	2014	Rock	Single	Oct 25, 2018
"Paralyzer"	Finger Eleven	2007	Alternative	Single	Nov 1, 2018
"Australia"	The Shins	2007	Indie Rock	Single	Nov 1, 2018
"Little Black Backpack '09"	Stroke 9	2010	Rock	Single	Nov 1, 2018
"Time to Say Goodbye"	Jeff Williams ft. Casey Lee Williams	2014	Rock	Single	Nov 1, 2018
"Thinking Emoji"	Barely March	2018	Punk	Discover: ReverbNation 01	Nov 8, 2018
"Love That Hurts"	PREACHERVAN	2018	Alternative	Discover: ReverbNation 01	Nov 8, 2018
"Let's Just Dance"	Ships Have Sailed	2018	Alternative	Discover: ReverbNation 01	Nov 8, 2018
"Save Yourself"	tiLLie	2017	Alternative	Discover: ReverbNation 01	Nov 8, 2018
"Is There a Ghost"	Band of Horses	2007	Indie Rock	Band of Horses 01	Nov 15, 2018
"No One's Gonna Love You"	Band of Horses	2007	Indie Rock	Band of Horses 01	Nov 15, 2018
"The Funeral"	Band of Horses	2006	Indie Rock	Band of Horses 01	Nov 15, 2018
"One Step Closer"	Linkin Park	2000	Nu-Metal	Single	Nov 20, 2018
"Come Out and Play (Keep 'Em Separated)"	The Offspring	1994	Punk	Single	Nov 20, 2018
"Natural"	Imagine Dragons	2018	Alternative	Single	Nov 29, 2018
"Girls Like You"	Maroon 5	2017	Pop-Rock	Single	Nov 29, 2018
"Crazy on You"	Heart	1976	Classic Rock	Single	Dec 6, 2018
"Magic Man"	Heart	1976	Classic Rock	Single	Dec 6, 2018
"Lose It"	Kane Brown	2018	Country	Single	Dec 13, 2018
"Hotel Key"	Old Dominion	2017	Country	Single	Dec 13, 2018
"Never Let You Go '09"	Third Eye Blind	2009	Alternative	Single	Dec 20, 2018
"Semi Charmed Life '09"	Third Eye Blind	2009	Alternative	Single	Dec 20, 2018
"99"	Barns Courtney	2018	Alternative	Single	Dec 20, 2018
"Music Is Worth Living For"	Andrew W.K.	2018	Rock	Single	Dec 20, 2018
"Peace Sells"	Megadeth	1986	Metal	Single	Jan 3, 2019
"Angel of Death"	Slayer	1986	Metal	Single	Jan 3, 2019
"Starlight"	BABYMETAL	2018	Metal	Single	Jan 10, 2019
"When Legends Rise"	Godsmack	2018	Nu-Metal	Single	Jan 10, 2019
"Forever in Your Hands"	All That Remains	2008	Metal	Single	Jan 17, 2019
"Hey There Mr. Brooks"	Asking Alexandria	2009	Metal	Single	Jan 17, 2019
"Remedy"	Seether	2005	Metal	Single	Jan 17, 2019
"Learn to Fly"	Foo Fighters	1999	Alternative	Single	Jan 24, 2019
"The Hand That Feeds"	Nine Inch Nails	2005	Rock	Single	Jan 24, 2019
"Shame"	Elle King	2018	Alternative	Single	Jan 31, 2019
"Body Talks"	The Struts	2018	Rock	Single	Jan 31, 2019
"Gasoline"	The Bouncing Souls	2010	Alternative	Single	Feb 7, 2019
"The Triumph"	Jeff Williams ft. Casey Lee Williams	2018	Rock	Single	Feb 7, 2019
"Lady in a Blue Dress"	Senses Fail	2004	Alternative	Single	Feb 7, 2019
"Push"	Matchbox Twenty	1996	Alternative	Single	Feb 14, 2019
"The Reason"	Hoobastank	2004	Alternative	Single	Feb 14, 2019
"Wagon Wheel"	Darius Rucker	2013	Country	Single	Feb 21, 2019
"Bitch"	Meredith Brooks	1997	Alternative	Single	Feb 21, 2019
"Farewell, Mona Lisa"	The Dillinger Escape Plan	2010	Metal	Single	Feb 28, 2019
"Bleed"	Meshuggah	2008	Metal	Single	Feb 28, 2019
"[&] Delinquents"	Woe, Is Me	2010	Rock	Single	Feb 28, 2019
"Drown"	Bring Me the Horizon	2015	Nu-Metal	Bring Me the Horizon 01	Mar 7, 2019
"MANTRA"	Bring Me the Horizon	2019	Nu-Metal	Bring Me the Horizon 01	Mar 7, 2019
"Pray for Plagues"	Bring Me the Horizon	2006	Nu-Metal	Bring Me the Horizon 01	Mar 7, 2019
"Paradise"	Coldplay	2011	Alternative	Single	Mar 14, 2019
"Uma Thurman"	Fall Out Boy	2014	Pop-Rock	Single	Mar 14, 2019
"Superposition"	Young the Giant	2018	Alternative	Single	Mar 21, 2019
"When the Seasons Change"	Five Finger Death Punch	2018	Metal	Single	Mar 21, 2019
"Lemon Meringue Tie"	Dance Gavin Dance	2007	Indie Rock	Single	Mar 28, 2019
"Caraphernelia"	Pierce the Veil	2010	Emo	Single	Mar 28, 2019
"Battle Royale"	The Word Alive	2009	Metal	Single	Mar 28, 2019
"S.O.S."	The Glorious Sons	2017	Rock	Single	Apr 4, 2019
"Do Your Worst"	Rival Sons	2019	Rock	Single	Apr 4, 2019
"If You Can't Hang"	Sleeping With Sirens	2011	Emo	Single	Apr 11, 2019
"The Attitude Song"	Steve Vai	1984	Rock	Single	Apr 11, 2019
"Seven"	Sunny Day Real Estate	1994	Alternative	Single	Apr 11, 2019
"I'm Gonna Be (500 Miles)"	The Proclaimers	1988	Rock	Single	Apr 18, 2019
"La Bamba"	Los Lobos	1987	Pop-Rock	Single	Apr 18, 2019
"Do Not Disturb"	Halestorm	2018	Rock	Single	Apr 25, 2019
"Flag in the Ground"	Sonata Arctica	2009	Metal	Single	Apr 25, 2019
"Disengage"	Suicide Silence	2009	Metal	Single	Apr 25, 2019
"Hold On"	All That Remains	2010	Metal	Single	May 2, 2019
"The Gun Show"	In This Moment	2010	Metal	Single	May 2, 2019
"Harmony Hall"	Vampire Weekend	2019	Indie Rock	Single	May 2, 2019
"It's Complicated"	A Day to Remember	2010	Punk	Single	May 9, 2019
"Longshot"	Catfish and the Bottlemen	2019	Indie Rock	Single	May 9, 2019
"Nemesis"	Arch Enemy	2005	Metal	Single	May 16, 2019
"Over My Head"	Judah & the Lion	2019	Alternative	Single	May 16, 2019
"Night on Bald Mountain (Mussorgsky)"	Paul Henry Smith & The Fauxharmonic Orchestra	2010	Classical	Single	May 16, 2019
"The Serpentine Offering"	Dimmu Borgir	2007	Metal	Single	May 23, 2019
"Salvation"	The Strumbellas	2019	Alternative	Single	May 23, 2019
"You Only Live Once"	Suicide Silence	2011	Metal	Single	May 30, 2019
"Tourniquet"	Breaking Benjamin	2018	Alternative	Single	May 30, 2019
"The Waiting One"	All That Remains	2010	Metal	Single	Jun 6, 2019
"When Am I Gonna Lose You"	Local Natives	2019	Alternative	Single	Jun 6, 2019
"Wake Up"	Suicide Silence	2009	Metal	Single	Jun 6, 2019
"The Difference Between Medicine and Poison is in the Dose"	Circa Survive	2007	Alternative	Single	Jun 13, 2019
"If I'm James Dean, You're Audrey Hepburn"	Sleeping With Sirens	2010	Emo	Single	Jun 13, 2019
"Berzerker"	After the Burial	2009	Metal	Single	Jun 20, 2019
"We Are Not Anonymous"	Unearth	2008	Metal	Single	Jun 20, 2019
"Shallow Waters"	Amberian Dawn	2009	Metal	Single	Jun 27, 2019
"Lexington (Joey Pea-Pot With a Monkey Face)"	Chiodos	2007	Emo	Single	Jun 27, 2019
"Sucker"	Jonas Brothers	2019	Pop-Rock	Single	Jul 2, 2019
"High Hopes"	Panic! at the Disco	2018	Emo	Single	Jul 2, 2019
"Days Without"	All That Remains	2008	Metal	Single	Jul 11, 2019
"Change"	The Revivalists	2018	Alternative	Single	Jul 11, 2019
"Kick Some Ass '09"	Stroke 9	2010	Rock	Single	Jul 11, 2019
"100 Bad Days"	AJR	2019	Pop-Rock	Single	Jul 18, 2019
"Caves"	Chiodos	2010	Emo	Single	Jul 18, 2019
"Requiem for a Dying Song"	Flogging Molly	2008	Punk	Single	Jul 18, 2019
"For We Are Many"	All That Remains	2010	Metal	Single	Jul 25, 2019
"Obfuscation"	Between the Buried and Me	2009	Prog	Single	Jul 25, 2019
"Alligator"	Of Monsters and Men	2019	Indie Rock	Single	Jul 25, 2019
"The Plot to Bomb the Panhandle"	A Day to Remember	2007	Punk	Single	Aug 1, 2019
"The Final Episode (Let's Change the Channel)"	Asking Alexandria	2009	Metal	Single	Aug 1, 2019
"Blame It on My Youth"	Blink-182	2019	Punk	Single	Aug 1, 2019
"Undone"	All That Remains	2008	Metal	Single	Aug 8, 2019
"Very Busy People"	The Limousines	2010	Alternative	Single	Aug 8, 2019
"Gloria"	The Lumineers	2019	Indie Rock	Single	Aug 8, 2019
"Have Faith in Me"	A Day to Remember	2009	Punk	Single	Aug 15, 2019
"Hurt"	Oliver Tree	2019	Alternative	Single	Aug 15, 2019
"Jumpers"	Sleater-Kinney	2005	Indie Rock	Single	Aug 15, 2019
"Battles and Brotherhood"	3 Inches of Blood	2009	Metal	Single	Aug 22, 2019
"Missed Connection"	The Head and the Heart	2019	Alternative	Single	Aug 22, 2019
"The Hounds of Anubis"	The Word Alive	2010	Metal	Single	Aug 22, 2019
"Robots May Break Your Heart"	Riverboat Gamblers	2008	Punk	Single	Aug 29, 2019
"Entertain"	Sleater-Kinney	2005	Indie Rock	Single	Aug 29, 2019
"Old Town Road (Remix)"	Lil Nas X ft. Billy Ray Cyrus	2019	Country	Single	Sep 5, 2019
"21"	H.E.R.	2019	R&B/Soul/Funk	Single	Sep 12, 2019
"Buster Voodoo"	Rodrigo y Gabriela	2009	Rock	Single	Sep 12, 2019
"sugar honey ice & tea"	Bring Me the Horizon	2019	Nu-Metal	Single	Sep 19, 2019
"When I'm Gone"	Dirty Honey	2019	Rock	Single	Sep 19, 2019
"Highway to Oblivion"	DragonForce	2019	Metal	Single	Sep 26, 2019
"For the Love of God (Live)"	Steve Vai	2009	Rock	Single	Sep 26, 2019
"The Mob Goes Wild"	Clutch	2004	Rock	Single	Oct 3, 2019
"This City Made Us"	The Protomen	2015	Rock	Single	Oct 3, 2019
"Two Shots"	Duck & Cover	2019	Punk	4th Anniversary Free DLC Pack	Oct 10, 2019
"Don't Let Her Go"	Newfane	2019	Alternative	4th Anniversary Free DLC Pack	Oct 10, 2019
"Time for Crime"	ORION	2019	Pop/Dance/Electronic	4th Anniversary Free DLC Pack	Oct 10, 2019
"Fall Apart"	Shocked Laura	2019	Pop/Dance/Electronic	4th Anniversary Free DLC Pack	Oct 10, 2019
"Blue on Black"	Five Finger Death Punch	2018	Metal	Single	Oct 17, 2019
"Trouble"	Five Finger Death Punch	2017	Metal	Single	Oct 17, 2019
"You're Gonna Say Yeah!"	Hushpuppies	2005	Rock	Single	Oct 24, 2019
"Might Be Right"	White Reaper	2019	Alternative	Single	Oct 24, 2019
"Feed My Frankenstein"	Alice Cooper	1991	Rock	Single	Oct 31, 2019
"Unsainted"	Slipknot	2019	Nu-Metal	Single	Oct 31, 2019
"CHAMPION"	Bishop Briggs	2019	Alternative	Single	Nov 7, 2019
"Good Things Fall Apart"	Illenium & Jon Bellion	2019	Pop/Dance/Electronic	Single	Nov 7, 2019
"Sequestered in Memphis"	The Hold Steady	2008	Indie Rock	Single	Nov 14, 2019
"You're A Wolf"	Sea Wolf	2007	Indie Rock	Single	Nov 14, 2019
"Dear Insanity"	Asking Alexandria	2011	Metal	Single	Nov 21, 2019
"Morte et Dabo"	Asking Alexandria	2011	Metal	Single	Nov 21, 2019
"Back Foot"	Dinosaur Pile-Up	2019	Rock	The Riff Pack	Nov 26, 2019
"Welcome Home"	Hellyeah	2019	Rock	The Riff Pack	Nov 26, 2019
"Taste of Regret"	Of Mice & Men	2019	Metal	The Riff Pack	Nov 26, 2019
"Prom Queen"	Beach Bunny	2018	Alternative	The New Rock Pack	Dec 5, 2019
"Panic Attack"	The Glorious Sons	2019	Rock	The New Rock Pack	Dec 5, 2019
"16"	Highly Suspect	2019	Alternative	The New Rock Pack	Dec 5, 2019
"Crush"	Dave Matthews Band	1998	Rock	Wax Eclectic Pack	Dec 12, 2019
"Blind Leading the Blind"	Mumford & Sons	2019	Rock	Wax Eclectic Pack	Dec 12, 2019
"One Kind of Solomon"	The New Pornographers	2019	Alternative	Wax Eclectic Pack	Dec 12, 2019
"bad guy"	Billie Eilish	2019	Pop/Dance/Electronic	Headliners Pack	Dec 19, 2019
"Orphans"	Coldplay	2019	Alternative	Headliners Pack	Dec 19, 2019
"Take What You Want"	Post Malone ft. Ozzy Osbourne & Travis Scott	2019	Pop-Rock	Headliners Pack	Dec 19, 2019
"Father of All..."	Green Day	2020	Alternative	Single	Jan 9, 2020
"The End of the Game"	Weezer	2020	Alternative	Single	Jan 9, 2020
"Young Bloods"	The Bronx	2008	Punk	Single	Jan 16, 2020
"I Just Wanna Shine"	Fitz and the Tantrums	2019	Pop-Rock	Single	Jan 16, 2020
"All the Way (Stay)"	Jimmy Eat World	2019	Alternative	Single	Jan 23, 2020
"Chelsea"	The Summer Set	2009	Pop-Rock	Single	Jan 23, 2020
"Circles"	Post Malone	2019	Pop-Rock	Single	Jan 30, 2020
"Can You Tell"	Ra Ra Riot	2008	Indie Rock	Single	Jan 30, 2020
"Addicted"	Simple Plan	2002	Alternative	Simple Plan 01	Feb 6, 2020
"Welcome to My Life"	Simple Plan	2004	Alternative	Simple Plan 01	Feb 6, 2020
"Where I Belong"	Simple Plan & State Champs feat. We the Kings	2019	Alternative	Simple Plan 01	Feb 6, 2020
"No More Mr. Nice Guy"	Alice Cooper	1973	Rock	Single	Feb 13, 2020
"Mechanical Love"	In This Moment	2008	Metal	Single	Feb 13, 2020
"50,000 Unstoppable Watts"	Clutch	2009	Rock	Single	Feb 20, 2020
"Hanuman"	Rodrigo y Gabriela	2009	Rock	Single	Feb 20, 2020
"Inside Out"	Five Finger Death Punch	2020	Metal	Single	Feb 27, 2020
"Novocaine"	The Unlikely Candidates	2019	Alternative	Single	Feb 27, 2020
"Sticks & Bricks"	A Day to Remember	2010	Punk	Single	Mar 5, 2020
"5678"	Fake Problems	2010	Alternative	Single	Mar 5, 2020
"Mordecai"	Between the Buried and Me	2003	Prog	Single	Mar 12, 2020
"Icarus Lives"	Periphery	2010	Metal	Single	Mar 12, 2020
"The Best"	AWOLNATION	2019	Alternative	Single	Mar 19, 2020
"Colors"	Black Pumas	2019	Alternative	Single	Mar 19, 2020
"Some Kind of Disaster"	All Time Low	2020	Emo	Single	Mar 26, 2020
"Better Off This Way"	A Day to Remember	2010	Punk	Single	Mar 26, 2020
"Abigail"	Motionless in White	2010	Metal	Single	Apr 2, 2020
"Approach the Podium"	Winds of Plague	2009	Metal	Single	Apr 2, 2020
"Don't Start Now"	Dua Lipa	2019	Pop/Dance/Electronic	Single	Apr 9, 2020
"Simmer"	Hayley Williams	2020	Alternative	Single	Apr 9, 2020
"Boy"	Ra Ra Riot	2010	Indie Rock	Single	Apr 16, 2020
"One Man Band"	Old Dominion	2019	Country	Single	Apr 16, 2020
"Juice" (Note: Song was initially pulled from the Rock Band store due to accidentally having the word "nigga" charted in the vocals. A patch was released a week later, which censored the word.)	Lizzo	2019	Pop/Dance/Electronic	Single	Apr 23, 2020
"Bad Decisions"	The Strokes	2020	Rock	Single	Apr 23, 2020
"Alive and Kicking"	Nonpoint	2005	Rock	Single	Apr 30, 2020
"Born to Be Wild"	Steppenwolf	1968	Classic Rock	Single	Apr 30, 2020
"Rolling 7s"	Dirty Honey	2019	Rock	Single	May 7, 2020
"Special Effects"	Freezepop	2010	Pop/Dance/Electronic	Single	May 7, 2020
"Reckless & Relentless"	Asking Alexandria	2011	Metal	Single	May 14, 2020
"Arcaedion"	Children of Nova	2009	Prog	Single	May 14, 2020
"Glycerine"	Bush	1994	Grunge	Single	May 21, 2020
"With Arms Wide Open"	Creed	1999	Rock	Single	May 21, 2020
"Be Careful What You Wish For"	Memphis May Fire	2010	Metal	Single	May 28, 2020
"Hook, Line and Sinner"	Texas in July	2009	Metal	Single	May 28, 2020
"Far Away"	Breaking Benjamin ft. Scooter Ward of COLD	2020	Rock	Single	Jun 4, 2020
"Level of Concern"	Twenty One Pilots	2020	Alternative	Single	Jun 4, 2020
"Where Were You?"	Every Avenue	2008	Alternative	Single	Jun 11, 2020
"Falling"	Trevor Daniel	2020	Pop/Dance/Electronic	Single	Jun 11, 2020
"I Think We're Alone Now"	Billie Joe Armstrong	2020	Alternative	Single	Jun 18, 2020
"Van Horn"	Saint Motel	2019	Indie Rock	Single	Jun 18, 2020
"Dark Horse"	Converge	2009	Metal	Single	Jun 25, 2020
"Popular Monster"	Falling In Reverse	2019	Rock	Single	Jun 25, 2020
"10,000 Hours"	Dan + Shay & Justin Bieber	2019	Country	Single	Jul 2, 2020
"Used To Like"	Neon Trees	2019	Alternative	Single	Jul 2, 2020
"Bang!"	AJR	2020	Pop-Rock	Single	Jul 9, 2020
"Incubus"	Amberian Dawn	2009	Metal	Single	Jul 9, 2020
"Adore You"	Harry Styles	2019	Pop/Dance/Electronic	Single	Jul 16, 2020
"Wars"	Of Monsters and Men	2019	Indie Rock	Single	Jul 16, 2020
"Learn to Live"	Architects	2011	Metal	Single	Jul 23, 2020
"Killing Me Slowly"	Bad Wolves	2019	Rock	Single	Jul 23, 2020
"Ikea"	Jonathan Coulton	2003	Rock	Single	Jul 30, 2020
"This is Not a Song, It's a Sandwich!"	Psychostick	2009	Metal	Single	Jul 30, 2020
"Shiver"	Coldplay	2000	Alternative	Coldplay Parachutes to Everyday Life Pack	Aug 6, 2020
"Speed of Sound"	Coldplay	2005	Alternative	Coldplay Parachutes to Everyday Life Pack	Aug 6, 2020
"Champion of the World" (Note: Song was initially released exclusively bundled with the Coldplay Parachutes to Everyday Life Pack. It was released individually on August 13, 2020.)	Coldplay	2019	Alternative	Coldplay Parachutes to Everyday Life Pack	Aug 6, 2020
"Something Just Like This"	The Chainsmokers & Coldplay	2017	Pop/Dance/Electronic	Coldplay Parachutes to Everyday Life Pack	Aug 6, 2020
"Buttersnips"	Periphery	2010	Metal	Single	Aug 20, 2020
"Burning Hearts"	Silverstein	2011	Rock	Single	Aug 20, 2020
"Cradles"	Sub Urban	2019	Pop/Dance/Electronic	Single	Aug 27, 2020
"Blinding Lights"	The Weeknd	2019	Pop/Dance/Electronic	Single	Aug 27, 2020
"We Are the One"	Anti-Flag	2009	Punk	Single	Sep 3, 2020
"History of Violence"	Theory of a Deadman	2019	Rock	Single	Sep 3, 2020
"Antisocialist"	Asking Alexandria	2020	Metal	Single	Sep 10, 2020
"Deathbed Atheist"	Norma Jean	2010	Metal	Single	Sep 10, 2020
"Monsters"	All Time Low ft. Blackbear	2020	Emo	Single	Sep 17, 2020
"Flightless Bird, American Mouth"	Iron & Wine	2007	Indie Rock	Single	Sep 17, 2020
"I Know What I Am"	Band of Skulls	2009	Indie Rock	Single	Sep 24, 2020
"I Hope"	Gabby Barrett	2020	Country	Single	Sep 24, 2020
"Angels & Demons"	Jxdn	2020	Alternative	Single	Oct 1, 2020
"Stand for Something"	Skindred	2009	Metal	Single	Oct 1, 2020
"Some1Else"	Blame It On Whitman	2020	Punk	5th Anniversary Free DLC Pack	Oct 8, 2020
"Run With You"	Radio Compass	2020	Indie Rock	5th Anniversary Free DLC Pack	Oct 8, 2020
"Masquerader"	Ravi Shavi	2020	Indie Rock	5th Anniversary Free DLC Pack	Oct 8, 2020
"Stevie Sees"	Toad and the Stooligans	2020	Hip-Hop/Rap	5th Anniversary Free DLC Pack	Oct 8, 2020
"Any Other Heart"	Go Radio	2011	Pop-Rock	Single	Oct 15, 2020
"Teenage Dirtbag (2020)"	Wheatus	2020	Pop-Rock	Single	Oct 15, 2020
"Fate of the Maiden"	Amberian Dawn	2008	Metal	Single	Oct 22, 2020
"Selkies: The Endless Obsession"	Between the Buried and Me	2005	Metal	Single	Oct 22, 2020
"A Little Bit Off"	Five Finger Death Punch	2020	Metal	Single	Oct 29, 2020
"The Devil Went Down to Georgia"	Nickelback	2020	Rock	Single	Oct 29, 2020
"CITY OF ANGELS"	24kGoldn	2019	Hip-Hop/Rap	Single	Nov 5, 2020
"Spin"	We the Kings	2009	Alternative	Single	Nov 5, 2020
"White Knuckles"	OK Go	2010	Alternative	Single	Nov 12, 2020
"Caution"	The Killers	2020	Alternative	Single	Nov 12, 2020
"Alive With The Glory Of Love"	Say Anything	2004	Emo	Single	Nov 19, 2020
"Cute Without The 'E' (Cut From the Team)"	Taking Back Sunday	2002	Emo	Single	Nov 19, 2020
"Shot in the Dark"	AC/DC	2020	Rock	Single	Nov 24, 2020
"Death by Rock and Roll"	The Pretty Reckless	2020	Rock	Single	Nov 24, 2020
"Come & Go"	Juice WRLD & Marshmello	2020	Hip-Hop/Rap	Single	Dec 3, 2020
"Rollin' (Air Raid Vehicle)"	Limp Bizkit	2000	Nu-Metal	Single	Dec 3, 2020
"Rebel Rebel"	David Bowie	1974	Rock	Single	Dec 10, 2020
"My Way, Soon"	Greta Van Fleet	2020	Rock	Single	Dec 10, 2020
"Stacy's Mom"	Fountains of Wayne	2003	Pop-Rock	Single	Dec 17, 2020
"Prisoner"	Dance Gavin Dance	2020	Indie Rock	Single	Dec 17, 2020
"Come and Get Your Love"	Redbone	1974	R&B/Soul/Funk	Single	Dec 22, 2020
"Golden"	Harry Styles	2019	Pop-Rock	Single	Dec 29, 2020
"Higher"	Shawn Mendes	2020	Pop/Dance/Electronic	Single	Dec 29, 2020
"Anthem Part Two"	Blink-182	2001	Punk	Single	Jan 7, 2021
"Hanging by a Moment"	Lifehouse	2000	Rock	Single	Jan 7, 2021
"Let The Games Begin"	Anarbor	2010	Alternative	Single	Jan 14, 2021
"bloody valentine"	Machine Gun Kelly	2020	Alternative	Single	Jan 14, 2021
"All Downhill from Here"	New Found Glory	2004	Punk	New Found Glory 01	Jan 21, 2021
"Greatest of All Time"	New Found Glory	2020	Punk	New Found Glory 01	Jan 21, 2021
"My Friends Over You"	New Found Glory	2002	Punk	New Found Glory 01	Jan 21, 2021
"To the Stage"	Asking Alexandria	2011	Metal	Single	Jan 28, 2021
"Visitor"	Of Monsters and Men	2020	Alternative	Single	Jan 28, 2021
"Sick, Sick, Sick"	Bayside	2011	Alternative	Single	Feb 4, 2021
"ily (i love you baby)"	Surf Mesa ft. Emilee	2019	Pop/Dance/Electronic	Single	Feb 4, 2021
"Take Me Home, Country Roads"	John Denver	1971	Country	Single	Feb 4, 2021
"Let My Love Open the Door"	Pete Townshend	1980	New Wave	Single	Feb 11, 2021
"The Bad Touch"	Bloodhound Gang	1999	Pop/Dance/Electronic	Single	Feb 11, 2021
"Fatal Illusion"	Megadeth	2016	Metal	Single	Feb 18, 2021
"Smash the Control Machine"	Otep	2009	Metal	Single	Feb 18, 2021
"Dreamchaser"	Amberian Dawn	2008	Metal	Single	Feb 25, 2021
"Help I'm Alive"	Metric	2009	Alternative	Single	Feb 25, 2021
"Superman"	Goldfinger	1997	Reggae/Ska	Single	Mar 4, 2021
"Younger Lungs"	Less Than Jake	2012	Reggae/Ska	Single	Mar 4, 2021
"Demon Woman"	Flight of the Conchords	2009	Novelty	Single	Mar 11, 2021
"Good Morning Tucson"	Jonathan Coulton	2011	Rock	Single	Mar 11, 2021
"Alaska"	Between the Buried and Me	2005	Metal	Single	Mar 18, 2021
"The Order"	Children of Nova	2009	Prog	Single	Mar 18, 2021
"Aspiration"	After the Burial	2009	Metal	Single	Mar 25, 2021
"Way Less Sad"	AJR	2021	Pop-Rock	Single	Mar 25, 2021
"My Ex's Best Friend"	Machine Gun Kelly & blackbear	2020	Alternative	Single	Apr 1, 2021
"Leaderless and Self Enlisted"	Norma Jean	2010	Metal	Single	Apr 1, 2021
"Dear Maria, Count Me In"	All Time Low	2007	Emo	Single	Apr 8, 2021
"The One You Want"	The Get Up Kids	2004	Rock	Single	Apr 8, 2021
"Mindreader"	A Day to Remember	2021	Punk	A Day to Remember 01	Apr 15, 2021
"Paranoia"	A Day to Remember	2016	Punk	A Day to Remember 01	Apr 15, 2021
"Resentment"	A Day to Remember	2021	Punk	A Day to Remember 01	Apr 15, 2021
"Therefore I Am"	Billie Eilish	2020	Pop/Dance/Electronic	Single	Apr 22, 2021
"Heimdalsgate Like a Promethean Curse"	of Montreal	2007	Indie Rock	Single	Apr 22, 2021
"Running With The Wild Things"	Against The Current	2016	Pop-Rock	Single	Apr 29, 2021
"Tree Village"	Dance Gavin Dance	2009	Indie Rock	Single	Apr 29, 2021
"Kokko - Eagle of Fire"	Amberian Dawn	2009	Metal	Single	May 6, 2021
"Self Destructor"	Chevelle	2021	Rock	Single	May 6, 2021
"Someone to You"	BANNERS	2019	Alternative	Single	May 13, 2021
"Miracle"	Nonpoint	2010	Rock	Single	May 13, 2021
"All Bodies"	Between the Buried and Me	2005	Metal	Single	May 20, 2021
"Cheyne Stokes"	Chelsea Grin	2010	Metal	Single	May 20, 2021
"Who Do You Love?"	George Thorogood & the Destroyers	1978	Classic Rock	Single	May 27, 2021
"Wild Thing"	The Troggs	1966	Rock	Single	May 27, 2021
"Shipwrecked"	Alestorm	2011	Metal	Single	Jun 3, 2021
"Heat Waves"	Glass Animals	2020	Alternative	Single	Jun 3, 2021
"What's Left Of Me"	Blessthefall	2009	Alternative	Single	Jun 10, 2021
"And So It Went"	The Pretty Reckless ft. Tom Morello	2021	Rock	Single	Jun 10, 2021
"The Complexity of Light"	Children of Nova	2009	Prog	Single	Jun 17, 2021
"Follow You"	Imagine Dragons	2021	Alternative	Single	Jun 17, 2021
"Astronaut in the Ocean"	Masked Wolf	2019	Hip-Hop/Rap	Single	Jun 24, 2021
"Astronaut in the Ocean"	Our Last Night	2021	Metal	Single	Jun 24, 2021
"Rich Girl"	Hall & Oates	1976	Pop-Rock	Single	Jul 1, 2021
"All My Favorite Songs"	Weezer	2021	Alternative	Single	Jul 1, 2021
"Too Little Too Late"	A Skylit Drive	2011	Alternative	Single	Jul 8, 2021
"Comfort Eagle"	Cake	2001	Alternative	Single	Jul 8, 2021
"Roll the Dice"	Damone	2008	Rock	Single	Jul 15, 2021
"Rats"	Ghost	2018	Metal	Single	Jul 15, 2021
"Energy"	The Apples in Stereo	2007	Pop-Rock	Single	Jul 22, 2021
"Sell Out"	Reel Big Fish	1996	Reggae/Ska	Single	Jul 22, 2021
"The Great Salt Lake"	Band of Horses	2006	Indie Rock	Single	Jul 29, 2021
"I'm Amazed"	My Morning Jacket	2008	Alternative	Single	Jul 29, 2021
"Far Too Near"	AFI	2021	Rock	Single	Aug 5, 2021
"Shake Me Up"	HOUNDS	2017	Rock	Single	Aug 5, 2021
"Devil On My Shoulder"	Kelsy Karter	2020	Rock	Single	Aug 5, 2021
"Kids Of Summer"	Mayday Parade	2021	Rock	Single	Aug 5, 2021
"Tailspin"	Calling All Captains	2021	Rock	Single	Aug 12, 2021
"The Bird and the Worm"	The Used	2007	Emo	Single	Aug 12, 2021
"take my breath away // noose"	Capstan	2021	Rock	Single	Aug 19, 2021
"We Are Between"	Modest Mouse	2021	Indie Rock	Single	Aug 19, 2021
"Let the Bad Times Roll"	The Offspring	2021	Punk	Single	Aug 26, 2021
"You're Gonna Go Far, Kid"	The Offspring	2008	Punk	Single	Aug 26, 2021
"Hurricane"	I Prevail	2019	Metal	Single	Sep 2, 2021
"Nowhere Generation"	Rise Against	2021	Punk	Single	Sep 2, 2021
"Here's to the Night"	Eve 6	2000	Alternative	Single	Sep 9, 2021
"estella//"	KennyHoopla ft. Travis Barker	2021	Alternative	Single	Sep 9, 2021
"Drunk (And I Don't Wanna Go Home)"	Elle King & Miranda Lambert	2021	Alternative	Single	Sep 16, 2021
"Native Tongue"	My Kid Brother	2020	Alternative	Single	Sep 16, 2021
"good 4 u"	Olivia Rodrigo	2021	Pop-Rock	Single	Sep 23, 2021
"Freaks"	Surf Curse	2013	Indie Rock	Single	Sep 23, 2021
"Animals"	Architects	2021	Metal	Single	Sep 30, 2021
"Heat Above"	Greta Van Fleet	2021	Rock	Single	Sep 30, 2021
"Girl Scout Cookies"	Mom Jeans.	2016	Emo	6th Anniversary Free DLC Pack	Oct 6, 2021
"Like No Surprise"	Oldsoul	2020	Alternative	6th Anniversary Free DLC Pack	Oct 6, 2021
"The Title Track"	Origami Angel	2019	Emo	6th Anniversary Free DLC Pack	Oct 6, 2021
"Cosmic Thrill Seeking Forever"	Prince Daddy & The Hyena	2019	Alternative	6th Anniversary Free DLC Pack	Oct 6, 2021
"I Wanna Dance with Somebody (Who Loves Me)"	Fall Out Boy	2018	Pop-Rock	Single	Oct 14, 2021
"Blue Monday"	Orgy	1998	Nu-Metal	Single	Oct 14, 2021
"Africa"	Weezer	2019	Alternative	Single	Oct 14, 2021
"Back Through Time"	Alestorm	2011	Metal	Single	Oct 21, 2021
"Freakshow"	HourCast	2010	Rock	Single	Oct 21, 2021
"Creepy Doll"	Jonathan Coulton	2006	Pop-Rock	Single	Oct 28, 2021
"Time Warp"	Little Nell, Patricia Quinn & Richard O'Brien	1975	Glam	Single	Oct 28, 2021
"Flavor of the Weak"	American Hi-Fi	2001	Punk	Single	Nov 4, 2021
"Euphoria"	Angels & Airwaves	2021	Alternative	Single	Nov 4, 2021
"MONTERO (Call Me by Your Name)"	Lil Nas X	2021	Hip-Hop/Rap	Single	Nov 11, 2021
"A-O-K"	Tai Verdes	2021	Pop-Rock	Single	Nov 11, 2021
"Shimmer"	Fuel	1998	Rock	Single	Nov 18, 2021
"Pathkeeper"	Interloper	2021	Metal	Single	Nov 18, 2021
"Physical"	Olivia Newton-John	1981	Pop/Dance/Electronic	Single	Nov 23, 2021
"Paralyzed"	Sueco	2021	Hip-Hop/Rap	Single	Nov 23, 2021
"Peg"	Steely Dan	1977	Classic Rock	Single	Dec 2, 2021
"Grand Canyon"	The Wind and The Wave	2016	Indie Rock	Single	Dec 2, 2021
"Chelsea Dagger"	The Fratellis	2006	Alternative	Single	Dec 9, 2021
"The Call"	Ego Kill Talent	2021	Rock	Single	Dec 9, 2021
"I Can't Drive 55"	Sammy Hagar	1984	Rock	Single	Dec 16, 2021
"Rock You Like a Hurricane"	Scorpions	2011	Metal	Single	Dec 16, 2021
"Hazy Shade of Winter"	The Bangles	1987	Rock	Single	Dec 23, 2021
"Missing Piece"	Vance Joy	2021	Indie Rock	Single	Dec 23, 2021
"Cold Heart (PNAU Remix)"	Elton John - Dua Lipa	2021	Pop/Dance/Electronic	Single	Dec 30, 2021
"brutal"	Olivia Rodrigo	2021	Pop-Rock	Single	Dec 30, 2021
"Face Down"	The Red Jumpsuit Apparatus	2006	Emo	Single	Jan 6, 2022
"A Decade Under the Influence"	Taking Back Sunday	2004	Emo	Single	Jan 6, 2022
"¡Olé!"	The Bouncing Souls	1999	Punk	Single	Jan 13, 2022
"Let Me Fall Apart"	Light the Torch	2021	Metal	Single	Jan 13, 2022
"DiE4u"	Bring Me the Horizon	2021	Nu-Metal	Single	Jan 20, 2022
"Only Love Can Save Me Now"	The Pretty Reckless ft. Matt Cameron & Kim Thayil	2021	Rock	Single	Jan 20, 2022
"Sk8er Boi"	Avril Lavigne	2002	Pop-Rock	Single	Jan 27, 2022
"Memory"	Sugarcult	2004	Punk	Single	Jan 27, 2022
"Ain't No King"	The Almost	2019	Rock	Single	Feb 3, 2022
"Secret Garden"	Spiritbox	2021	Metal	Single	Feb 3, 2022
"Light My Love"	Greta Van Fleet	2021	Rock	Single	Feb 10, 2022
"Stay (I Missed You)"	Lisa Loeb	1994	Pop-Rock	Single	Feb 10, 2022
"A Clockwork Expectation"	Fractal Universe	2021	Metal	Single	Feb 17, 2022
"Earth Is A Black Hole"	Teenage Wrist	2021	Alternative	Single	Feb 17, 2022
"Stellar"	Incubus	1999	Alternative	Single	Feb 24, 2022
"Show Me the Way" (Live)	Peter Frampton	1976	Rock	Single	Feb 24, 2022
"Dreaming"	Blondie	1979	New Wave	Single	Mar 3, 2022
"abcdefu"	GAYLE	2021	Pop-Rock	Single	Mar 3, 2022
"Stay High"	Brittany Howard	2019	Rock	Single	Mar 10, 2022
"Take It Off"	The Donnas	2002	Rock	Single	Mar 10, 2022
"Respect"	Aretha Franklin	1967	R&B/Soul/Funk	Single	Mar 17, 2022
"Jolene"	Dolly Parton	1974	Country	Single	Mar 17, 2022
"Waking Up In Vegas"	Katy Perry	2008	Pop/Dance/Electronic	Single	Mar 24, 2022
"Man! I Feel Like a Woman!"	Shania Twain	1997	Country	Single	Mar 24, 2022
"Love It When You Hate Me"	Avril Lavigne ft. Blackbear	2022	Pop-Rock	Single	Mar 31, 2022
"Dead Inside"	Nita Strauss ft. David Draiman of Disturbed	2021	Metal	Single	Mar 31, 2022
"Chaise Longue"	Wet Leg	2022	Indie Rock	Single	Apr 7, 2022
"Devil's Radio"	The Velveteers	2021	Rock	Single	Apr 7, 2022
"Tonight"	Magnolia Park ft. Lil Lotus	2021	Punk	Single	Apr 14, 2022
"Matilda"	PUP	2022	Alternative	Single	Apr 14, 2022
"Gepetto"	Belly	1993	Alternative	Single	Apr 21, 2022
"Connection"	Elastica	1995	Alternative	Single	Apr 21, 2022
"Mouth Shut"	Lit	2022	Alternative	Single	Apr 28, 2022
"Bury Me (Tonight!)"	Save Face	2021	Emo	Single	Apr 28, 2022
"Broken"	Alfie Templeman	2022	Pop/Dance/Electronic	Single	May 5, 2022
"It's Been a Little Heavy Lately"	Joesef	2022	Pop/Dance/Electronic	Single	May 5, 2022
"I Won't Give It Up"	Beartooth	2021	Punk	Single	May 12, 2022
"Pretty Mouth"	girlfriends	2022	Punk	Single	May 12, 2022
"Ready for Combat"	Icon for Hire	2022	Alternative	Single	May 19, 2022
"Down"	St. Vincent	2021	Indie Rock	Single	May 19, 2022
"Making a Fire"	Foo Fighters	2021	Alternative	Single	May 26, 2022
"You Should Be Dancing"	Dee Gees	2021	Alternative	Single	May 26, 2022
"Devils Haircut"	Beck	1996	Alternative	Beck 01	Jun 2, 2022
"Saw Lightning"	Beck	2019	Alternative	Beck 01	Jun 2, 2022
"Sexx Laws"	Beck	1999	Alternative	Beck 01	Jun 2, 2022
"California Dreamin'"	Dirty Honey	2021	Rock	Single	Jun 9, 2022
"Seether"	Veruca Salt	1994	Alternative	Single	Jun 9, 2022
"Cat's in the Cradle"	Harry Chapin	1974	Classic Rock	Single	Jun 16, 2022
"Distance"	Mammoth WVH	2021	Rock	Single	Jun 16, 2022
"The Liars Club"	Coheed and Cambria	2022	Prog	Single	Jun 23, 2022
"Welcome Home"	Coheed and Cambria	2005	Prog	Single	Jun 23, 2022
"Fight for Your Right"	Beastie Boys	1986	Hip-Hop/Rap	Single	Jun 30, 2022
"Bring tha Noize"	Public Enemy ft. Anthrax	1991	Hip-Hop/Rap	Single	Jun 30, 2022
"I Think I'm OKAY"	Machine Gun Kelly, YUNGBLUD & Travis Barker	2019	Alternative	Single	Jul 7, 2022
"The Funeral"	YUNGBLUD	2022	Alternative	Single	Jul 7, 2022
"I Really Like You"	Carly Rae Jepsen	2015	Pop/Dance/Electronic	Single	Jul 14, 2022
"she's all i wanna be"	Tate McRae	2022	Pop-Rock	Single	Jul 14, 2022
"Wild Child"	The Black Keys	2022	Rock	Single	Jul 21, 2022
"Black Summer"	Red Hot Chili Peppers	2022	Alternative	Single	Jul 21, 2022
"when we were young"	Architects	2022	Metal	Single	Jul 28, 2022
"Just Pretend"	Bad Omens	2022	Metal	Single	Jul 28, 2022
"Anything Was Better"	The Interrupters	2022	Punk	Single	Aug 4, 2022
"Let Go"	Potty Mouth	2021	Pop-Rock	Single	Aug 4, 2022
"Love Brand New"	Bob Moses	2022	Pop/Dance/Electronic	Single	Aug 11, 2022
"The Hills"	The Faim	2022	Indie Rock	Single	Aug 11, 2022
"I Like You"	Bloods & Laura Jane Grace	2022	Punk	Single	Aug 18, 2022
"Take Me Away"	Fefe Dobson	2003	Pop-Rock	Single	Aug 18, 2022
"City of the Dead"	Hollywood Undead	2022	Nu-Metal	Single	Aug 25, 2022
"The Foundations of Decay"	My Chemical Romance	2022	Emo	Single	Aug 25, 2022
"Knights of Cydonia"	Muse	2006	Alternative	Muse 01	Sep 1, 2022
"Starlight"	Muse	2006	Alternative	Muse 01	Sep 1, 2022
"Won't Stand Down"	Muse	2022	Alternative	Muse 01	Sep 1, 2022
"The Mother We Share"	CHVRCHES	2013	Alternative	Single	Sep 8, 2022
"What You Know"	Two Door Cinema Club	2010	Indie Rock	Single	Sep 8, 2022
"Iris"	New Found Glory	2007	Punk	Single	Sep 15, 2022
"The Man Who Sold the World" (Live)	Nirvana	1994	Grunge	Single	Sep 15, 2022
"Mercy Me"	Alkaline Trio	2005	Punk	Single	Sep 22, 2022
"Runaway"	Starcrawler	2022	Punk	Single	Sep 22, 2022
"Headsweat"	The Foxies	2022	Pop-Rock	Single	Sep 29, 2022
"Oldest Daughter"	The Wonder Years	2022	Punk	Single	Sep 29, 2022
"Blood for the Blood God"	Ben Quad	2022	Emo	7th Anniversary Free DLC Pack	Oct 6, 2022
"End of the World"	Gulfer	2021	Emo	7th Anniversary Free DLC Pack	Oct 6, 2022
"Where the Heart Is"	Sweet Pill	2022	Emo	7th Anniversary Free DLC Pack	Oct 6, 2022
"Bombs Away"	Blastergun	2022	Rock	Single	Oct 13, 2022
"DIE OUT HERE"	DE'WAYNE ft. POORSTACY	2022	Alternative	Single	Oct 13, 2022
"Life Was Easier When I Only Cared About Me"	Bad Suns	2022	Indie Rock	Single	Oct 20, 2022
"F.C.P.R.E.M.I.X."	The Fall of Troy	2005	Rock	Single	Oct 20, 2022
"Canned Heat"	Jamiroquai	1999	R&B/Soul/Funk	Single	Oct 27, 2022
"Hard Times"	Paramore	2017	Pop-Rock	Single	Oct 27, 2022
"Rollercoaster"	Bleachers	2014	Alternative	Single	Nov 3, 2022
"Soak Up the Sun"	Sheryl Crow	2002	Pop-Rock	Single	Nov 3, 2022
"The Pallbearer Walks Alone"	The Dark Element	2019	Metal	Single	Nov 10, 2022
"Rainbow in the Dark"	Dio	1983	Metal	Single	Nov 10, 2022
"Sabotage"	Beastie Boys	1994	Hip-Hop/Rap	Rock Band Rewind 01 (Note: Song is available as individual tracks on PlayStation but is only available as a pack for Xbox.)	Nov 17, 2022
"Foreplay/Long Time"	Boston	1976	Classic Rock	Rock Band Rewind 01	Nov 17, 2022
"Dead on Arrival"	Fall Out Boy	2003	Pop-Rock	Rock Band Rewind 01	Nov 17, 2022
"Go with the Flow"	Queens of the Stone Age	2002	Alternative	Rock Band Rewind 01	Nov 17, 2022
"Cherub Rock"	Smashing Pumpkins	1993	Alternative	Rock Band Rewind 01	Nov 17, 2022
"I Can't Wait"	Ceramic Animal	2022	Alternative	Single	Nov 22, 2022
"I Ain't Worried"	OneRepublic	2022	Pop-Rock	Single	Nov 22, 2022
"Don't Fence Me In"	Amyl and the Sniffers	2021	Punk	Single	Dec 1, 2022
"Kiss Me Deadly"	Lita Ford	1988	Glam	Single	Dec 1, 2022
"Bonnie"	Cuffed Up	2021	Indie Rock	Single	Dec 8, 2022
"Crash Into Me"	Dave Matthews Band	1996	Rock	Single	Dec 8, 2022
"Radio Reject"	Magnolia Park	2022	Punk	Single	Dec 15, 2022
"Pass the Nirvana"	Pierce the Veil	2022	Emo	Single	Dec 15, 2022
"Hello There"	Cheap Trick	1977	Pop-Rock	Single	Dec 22, 2022
"Classless Act"	Classless Act ft. Vince Neil of Mötley Crüe	2022	Rock	Single	Dec 22, 2022
"Groove Is in the Heart"	Deee-Lite	1990	Pop/Dance/Electronic	Single	Dec 29, 2022
"Numb"	Marshmello and Khalid	2022	Pop/Dance/Electronic	Single	Dec 29, 2022
"Thank You, Pain."	The Agonist	2009	Metal	Riffing In The New Year 2023	Jan 5, 2023
"Second Sight Blackout"	Children of Nova	2009	Prog	Riffing In The New Year 2023	Jan 5, 2023
"The Fall of Aphonia"	Children of Nova	2009	Prog	Riffing In The New Year 2023	Jan 5, 2023
"We Collide"	Children of Nova	2009	Prog	Riffing In The New Year 2023	Jan 5, 2023
"Day of Mourning"	Despised Icon	2009	Metal	Riffing In The New Year 2023	Jan 5, 2023
"Shizuku"	Esprit D'Air	2012	J-Rock	Riffing In The New Year 2023	Jan 5, 2023
"You Ain't No Family"	iwrestledabearonce	2009	Metal	Riffing In The New Year 2023	Jan 5, 2023
"Still Alive"	Jonathan Coulton ft. Sara Quin	2011	Rock	Riffing In The New Year 2023	Jan 5, 2023
"Half Crazy"	Jukebox the Ghost	2010	Pop-Rock	Riffing In The New Year 2023	Jan 5, 2023
"Crazy"	Nonpoint	2010	Rock	Riffing In The New Year 2023	Jan 5, 2023
"Loved You a Little"	The Maine, Taking Back Sunday, and Charlotte Sands	2022	Pop-Rock	Single	Jan 12, 2023
"No Apologies"	Papa Roach	2022	Nu-Metal	Single	Jan 12, 2023
"Going Home to a Party"	JW Francis	2023	Indie Rock	Single	Jan 19, 2023
"Reelin' In the Years"	Steely Dan	1972	Classic Rock	Single	Jan 19, 2023
"Given Up"	Linkin Park	2007	Nu-Metal	Single	Jan 26, 2023
"Circles"	Varials	2022	Metal	Single	Jan 26, 2023
"Dangerous"	Set It Off	2022	Pop-Rock	Single	Feb 2, 2023
"Smile"	Wolf Alice	2021	Indie Rock	Single	Feb 2, 2023
"Sacrifice"	The Devil Wears Prada	2022	Metal	Single	Feb 9, 2023
"Crosses"	Sleeping With Sirens ft. Spencer Chamberlain of Underoath	2022	Emo	Single	Feb 9, 2023
"Better Together"	Jack Johnson	2005	Rock	Single	Feb 16, 2023
"Super Freaky Girl"	Nicki Minaj	2022	Pop/Dance/Electronic	Single	Feb 16, 2023
"Goodbye, Good Luck"	BEGINNERS	2022	Indie Rock	Single	Feb 23, 2023
"Worst Day"	ILLENIUM & Max	2022	Pop/Dance/Electronic	Single	Feb 23, 2023
"Bad Idea"	GUNNAR	2023	Rock	Single	Mar 2, 2023
"A Little Bit Better"	Ni/Co	2023	Pop-Rock	Single	Mar 2, 2023
"Here & Now"	Letters to Cleo	1993	Alternative	Single	Mar 9, 2023
"I'll Be There for You (Theme from "Friends")"	The Rembrandts	1995	Pop-Rock	Single	Mar 9, 2023
"High Society"	My Kid Brother	2022	Alternative	Single	Mar 16, 2023
"Take on Me"	Reel Big Fish	1998	Reggae/Ska	Single	Mar 16, 2023
"Let Me Out"	The Blue Stones	2022	Rock	Single	Mar 23, 2023
"Love From the Other Side"	Fall Out Boy	2023	Pop-Rock	Single	Mar 23, 2023
"Misery Business"	Paramore	2007	Pop-Rock	Single	Mar 30, 2023
"This Is Why"	Paramore	2023	Pop-Rock	Single	Mar 30, 2023
"L.E.S."	The Revel	2023	Indie Rock	Single	Apr 6, 2023
"The Gang's All Here"	Skid Row	2022	Glam	Single	Apr 6, 2023
"More the Victim"	Linkin Park	2023	Nu-Metal	Single	Apr 13, 2023
"Down to the Devil"	Naked Gypsy Queens	2022	Southern Rock	Single	Apr 13, 2023
"Space Oddity"	David Bowie	1969	Glam	Single	Apr 20, 2023
"Until I Found You"	Stephen Sanchez	2021	Pop-Rock	Single	Apr 20, 2023
"Mountain Sound"	Of Monsters and Men	2011	Indie Rock	Single	Apr 27, 2023
"PANIC"	YONAKA	2023	Alternative	Single	Apr 27, 2023
"Dial Tone"	Catch Your Breath	2022	Metal	Single	May 4, 2023
"Peace That Starts the War"	Wolves At The Gate	2022	Metal	Single	May 4, 2023
"Mary on a Cross"	Ghost	2019	Metal	Single	May 11, 2023
"Ultraviolet"	Spell	2022	Metal	Single	May 11, 2023
"Song 2"	Blur	1997	Alternative	Single	May 18, 2023
"Back to Better"	The Bouncing Souls	2023	Punk	Single	May 18, 2023
"lovespell"	covet	2023	Prog	Single	May 25, 2023
"Oh!"	The Linda Lindas	2022	Punk	Single	May 25, 2023
"Nobody"	Avenged Sevenfold	2023	Metal	Single	Jun 1, 2023
"Voices In My Head"	Falling In Reverse	2022	Rock	Single	Jun 1, 2023
"Goo Goo Muck"	The Cramps	1981	Rock	Single	Jun 8, 2023
"Rescued"	Foo Fighters	2023	Alternative	Single	Jun 8, 2023
"You Oughta Know"	Alanis Morissette	1995	Alternative	Single	Jun 15, 2023
"Cannonball"	AWOLNATION	2018	Alternative	Single	Jun 15, 2023
"Girls Make Me Wanna Die"	The Aces	2023	Pop-Rock	Single	Jun 22, 2023
"Settling"	Ripe	2023	Pop-Rock	Single	Jun 22, 2023
"Crossfire"	Stevie Ray Vaughan and Double Trouble	1989	Blues	Single	Jun 29, 2023
"I Can See for Miles"	The Who	1967	Classic Rock	Single	Jun 29, 2023
"All That She Wants"	Ace of Base	1993	Pop/Dance/Electronic	Single	Jul 6, 2023
"White Trash Millionaire"	Mom Jeans.	2022	Emo	Single	Jul 6, 2023
"Born in the Heat"	CIVIC	2023	Punk	Single	Jul 13, 2023
"Let Me Be Normal"	Militarie Gun	2022	Punk	Single	Jul 13, 2023
"Mind Rider"	Hail the Sun	2023	Prog	Single	Jul 20, 2023
"Through the Noise"	Nita Strauss ft. Lzzy Hale	2023	Metal	Single	Jul 20, 2023
"Aliens Exist"	Blink-182	1999	Punk	Single	Jul 27, 2023
"Big Rig"	Pigs Pigs Pigs Pigs Pigs Pigs Pigs	2023	Metal	Single	Jul 27, 2023
"Heartbreaker 2.0"	Dirty Honey	2023	Rock	Single	Aug 3, 2023
"Bad Things"	I Prevail	2022	Metal	Single	Aug 3, 2023
"Locked & Loaded"	The Brevet	2018	Rock	Single	Aug 10, 2023
"Homesick"	HUNNY	2022	Indie Rock	Single	Aug 10, 2023
"Believe"	The Bravery	2007	Alternative	Single	Aug 17, 2023
"Delete Myself"	Fake Names	2023	Punk	Single	Aug 17, 2023
"Makeshift Vehicles"	Body Thief	2022	Indie Rock	Single	Aug 24, 2023
"Medicine"	Tiny Moving Parts	2019	Emo	Single	Aug 24, 2023
"Burn"	Alexis Munroe	2023	Rock	Single	Aug 31, 2023
"Rain Down"	Solence	2023	Metal	Single	Aug 31, 2023
"The Fall"	flipturn	2022	Indie Rock	Single	Sep 7, 2023
"Heartbreak of the Century"	Neck Deep	2023	Punk	Single	Sep 7, 2023
"White Wedding (Part 1)"	Billy Idol	1982	Rock	Single	Sep 14, 2023
"Master Exploder"	Tenacious D	2006	Rock	Single	Sep 14, 2023
"IDWBS"	Friday Pilots Club	2022	Rock	Single	Sep 21, 2023
"The Summoning"	Sleep Token	2023	Prog	Single	Sep 21, 2023
"Masters of Morbidity"	200 Stab Wounds	2022	Metal	Single	Sep 28, 2023
"Roundabout"	Yes	1971	Prog	Single	Sep 28, 2023
"You're the Best"	Joe "Bean" Esposito	1984	Pop-Rock	Single	Oct 5, 2023
"Love U Madly"	Violet Saturn	2023	Pop-Rock	Single	Oct 5, 2023
"Pack of Smokes"	Blame It On Whitman	2023	Punk	8th Anniversary Free DLC Pack	Oct 6, 2023
"She's Got Sorcery"	I Fight Dragons	2021	Rock	8th Anniversary Free DLC Pack	Oct 6, 2023
"Black Earth, WI"	Ratboys	2023	Indie Rock	8th Anniversary Free DLC Pack	Oct 6, 2023
"Call Me Crazy"	ARXX ft. Pillow Queens	2023	Indie Rock	Single	Oct 12, 2023
"Season 5 (Break My Fall)"	TOWNS	2022	Pop-Rock	Single	Oct 12, 2023
"A Little Wild"	Anna Graceman & Ryan Corn	2023	Indie Rock	Single	Oct 19, 2023
"Love Is Not a Weapon"	Welshly Arms	2023	Indie Rock	Single	Oct 19, 2023
"All I Really Wanna Do"	Devon Gilfillian	2023	R&B/Soul/Funk	Single	Oct 26, 2023
"Miles and Miles"	The Heavy Heavy	2020	Indie Rock	Single	Oct 26, 2023
"Sickness"	Grey Daze	2020	Rock	Single	Nov 2, 2023
"Welcome Home"	Heaven's Basement	2013	Rock	Single	Nov 2, 2023
"Addison Rae"	Magnolia Park	2022	Punk	Single	Nov 9, 2023
"Check Yes Juliet"	We the Kings	2007	Emo	Single	Nov 9, 2023
"Riptide"	Beartooth	2022	Punk	Single	Nov 16, 2023
"Six Feet Under"	Charlotte Sands	2023	Pop-Rock	Single	Nov 16, 2023
"Rehab"	Amy Winehouse	2006	R&B/Soul/Funk	Single	Nov 23, 2023
"Brassic"	Grade 2	2023	Punk	Single	Nov 23, 2023
"It's Alright"	Cecilia Castleman	2022	Pop-Rock	Single	Nov 30, 2023
"Bath County"	Wednesday	2023	Indie Rock	Single	Nov 30, 2023
"Sometimes"	Dreamgirl	2021	Pop-Rock	Single	Dec 7, 2023
"Future Blind"	The Lighthouse and the Whaler	2018	Indie Rock	Single	Dec 7, 2023
"Poison Pill"	Silverstein	2022	Emo	Single	Dec 14, 2023
"Vasoline"	Stone Temple Pilots	1994	Alternative	Single	Dec 14, 2023
"Shapeshifter"	The Brevet	2020	Rock	Single	Dec 21, 2023
"Baker Street"	Gerry Rafferty	1978	Classic Rock	Single	Dec 21, 2023
"In a Big Country"	Big Country	1983	New Wave	Single	Dec 28, 2023
"Saturday Night's Alright for Fighting"	Elton John	1973	Classic Rock	Single	Dec 28, 2023
"Centerfold"	The J. Geils Band	1981	Rock	Single	Jan 4, 2024
"Low Rider"	WAR	1975	R&B/Soul/Funk	Single	Jan 4, 2024
"So What'cha Want"	Beastie Boys	1992	Hip-Hop/Rap	Single	Jan 11, 2024
"Breakout"	Foo Fighters	1999	Alternative	Single	Jan 11, 2024
"No One Knows"	Queens of the Stone Age	2002	Alternative	Single	Jan 11, 2024
"Goodbye Yellow Brick Road"	Elton John	1973	Classic Rock	Single	Jan 18, 2024
"Our Love Will Still Be There"	The Troggs	1966	Classic Rock	Single	Jan 18, 2024
"Wherever You Will Go"	The Calling	2001	Alternative	Single	Jan 25, 2024
"Thank You"	Dido	1999	Alternative	Single	Jan 25, 2024
"Send Me on My Way"	Rusted Root	1994	Rock	Single	Jan 25, 2024

== Exported set lists ==
In 2008, Harmonix began to offer owners of Rock Band games for Xbox 360 and PlayStation 3 the option of integrating songs from various titles in the series for use in other Rock Band games. With Rock Band 3, Wii players are also able to export songs; however, only Green Day: Rock Band and Rock Band 2 can be exported, and song files are downloaded individually.

- 55 of 58 songs from Rock Band could be exported to Rock Band 2 & Rock Band 3 after purchasing a license for US$4.99. In the European version, 63 of 67 songs can be exported to Rock Band 2 while 61 can be exported to Rock Band 3. As of 2015, the ability to export Rock Band has expired.
  - Each song is stored as an individual file, allowing the user to delete unwanted songs.
  - "Enter Sandman", "Paranoid", "Run to the Hills" and "Monsoon" cannot be exported to any other game.
  - "Rock and Roll Star" and "Hier kommt Alex" are exportable in Rock Band 2 but not Rock Band 3. Additionally, the DLC versions of these songs are unavailable in Rock Band 3.
  - "Dani California" and "Black Hole Sun" were initially not compatible with Rock Band 3 until the release of a November 8, 2011 title update for the game.
  - In the export for Rock Band 4, 47 of the 55 previously exportable tracks will be available in the game in the initial export package, while the remaining 8 tracks, "Blood Doll", "Brainpower", "Can't Let Go", "Day Late, Dollar Short", "I Get By", "Outside", "Pleasure (Pleasure)", and "Seven", will be made available at a later date.
- The following Rock Band Track Packs could be exported to the main games on the Xbox 360 and PlayStation 3 for no additional cost using a one-time code printed on the back of the game's manual. Later Track Packs contained songs which were exclusive to the Track Pack disc for a limited time before being released as DLC. All of these track packs remain redeemable on Xbox platforms. As of 2020, only AC/DC Live and Track Pack Vol. 2 are redeemable on PlayStation.
  - AC/DC Live (18 songs)
  - Track Pack Vol. 2 (20 songs)
  - Classic Rock Track Pack (20 songs)
  - Country Track Pack (21 songs)
  - Metal Track Pack (20 songs)
  - Country Track Pack 2 (21 songs)
- All 45 songs from Lego Rock Band could be exported to the main games on the Xbox 360 and PlayStation 3 after purchasing an Export License for US$9.99 using a unique code printed on the game's manual. However, as of 2015, the ability to export Lego Rock Band has expired.
- All 44 tracks from Green Day: Rock Band could be exported after purchasing an Export License for US$9.99 using a unique code printed on the game's manual. Pre-ordering the game at certain retailers allowed owners to waive this fee. The fee is also waived if one purchased the "Plus" edition of the game. As of 2015, the ability to export Green Day: Rock Band has expired.
- 79 of 84 songs from Rock Band 2 could be exported to Rock Band 3 after purchasing an Export License for US$9.99. As of 2015, the ability to export Rock Band 2 has expired.
  - 70 songs are offered in the initial export package, downloaded as a large single file for the Xbox 360 and PlayStation 3 versions and as individual song files on the Wii.
  - The 9 songs from Harmonix-based bands are not available in the initial export package; however, these songs are offered at no cost in the "Rock Band Free 01" pack released on January 4, 2011; this song pack is not available for Wii users.
  - "Battery", "Give It Away", "Spoonman", "Any Way You Want It" and "Let There Be Rock" are not available for export; however, "Give It Away" and "Spoonman" were featured as part of the Rock Band Blitz soundtrack, and the two songs were also later released as individual downloads. “Give It Away” has since been delisted as a single; “Spoonman” remains available to purchase.
  - The export for the Xbox 360 and PlayStation 3 versions requires the use of the unique code printed on the back of the Rock Band 2 instruction manual in order to attain an export key; this is the same code used for the redemption of the 20 bonus downloadable songs that were released shortly after Rock Band 2's launch. Prior to the export being delisted, EA support accommodated users who may have lost their previous code. On the Wii version, instead of redeeming a code to attain an export key, players only needed to have a Rock Band 2 save file present.
- All 25 songs from Rock Band Blitz are integrated into Rock Band 3 and Rock Band 4 for no additional cost. As of August 28, 2017, Rock Band Blitz and its soundtrack export are no longer available for purchase; however, the majority of individual songs will remain available for purchase as DLC for the foreseeable future.
- In the December 8, 2015 title update for Rock Band 4, verified purchasers of Rock Band 3 were able to export all 83 songs after purchasing an export license for US$14.99. As of December 1, 2020, the ability to export Rock Band 3 has expired.

== Promotions ==
Following the release of Rock Band, Harmonix and EA began to form partnerships with different companies and bands to provide promotional content.

- Harmonix Pack 01 was first released as part of a bonus disc included with the February 2008 issue of Official Xbox Magazine.
- "Inside the Fire" and "Indestructible" (from Disturbed Pack 01) were offered at no cost in June 2008 to customers who preordered the band's album Indestructible through Best Buy's online store.
- Crüe Fest Pack 01 was handed out as a prize in Stride's Ridiculously Long Lasting Rock Band Off, held in June 2008.
- On November 6, 2008, Harmonix began distributing 20 free downloadable songs to owners of Rock Band 2 for the Xbox 360 and PlayStation 3. The song pack could only be downloaded after redeeming a code printed inside the game's manual. These songs were released to the Wii as free downloads on January 13, 2009, and could be found in the Rock Band Music Store. Harmonix has made no announcement regarding plans to release these songs through the Music Store for the 360 or PS3. This content is playable in Rock Band, Rock Band 2 and Rock Band 3 for the 360 and PS3, with some of the content also playable in Lego Rock Band. Wii owners can only use this content in Rock Band 2 and Rock Band 3. As of 2015, the site on which the code could be redeemed was taken down. There are currently no ways to purchase this content.
- Beginning on March 24, 2009, Best Buy customers who purchased the specially-marked deluxe editions of Pearl Jam's Ten, received a promotional code that could be redeemed to download two additional live tracks ("Alive" and "State of Love and Trust"), as well as a studio version of "Brother". These songs were released to the XBLM and PSN during the week of June 22, 2009. They were released for the Wii the following week.
- Beginning March 31, 2009, Rock Band owners who purchased specially-marked copies of Spectacular! on DVD received promotional codes which could be redeemed to download the songs "Break My Heart" and "Don't Tell Me" from the film's soundtrack.
- Target offered a version of Pearl Jam's Backspacer which includes a copy of the album for use in Rock Band games. It was released alongside the standard edition of the album in September 2009.
- Best Buy offered limited editions of Brütal Legend which included a code to redeem for the Brütal Legend Track Pack. The song pack was released to the Rock Band Music Store on the same day.
- A listing on the Canadian website for GameStop and the UK website HMV includes a trio of songs to be handed out to customers who pre-order Rock Band 3. Songs in this pack include "Burning Down the House" from Talking Heads, "Blue Monday" from New Order, and "My Own Summer" by Deftones. This was later confirmed in a Joystiq report.
