= 2010 in downloadable songs for the Rock Band series =

- Songs released: 425
- Packs released: 38
- Albums released: 10

The Rock Band series of music video games supports downloadable songs for the Xbox 360, PlayStation 3, and Wii versions through the consoles' respective online services. Users can download songs on a track-by-track basis, with many of the tracks also offered as part of a "song pack" or complete album at a discounted rate. These packs are available for the Wii only on Rock Band 3. Most downloadable songs are playable within every game mode, including the Band World Tour career mode. All downloadable songs released before October 26, 2010, are cross-compatible between Rock Band, Rock Band 2 and Rock Band 3, while those after only work with Rock Band 3. Certain songs deemed "suitable for all ages" by Harmonix are also available for use in Lego Rock Band.

The Wii version of Rock Band does not support downloadable content, but Rock Band 2 and Rock Band 3 do, with DLC first made available in January 2009. Songs from the back catalogue of downloadable content were released for the Wii weekly in an effort by Harmonix to provide Wii players with every previously available song.

Following the release of Rock Band 4 for the PlayStation 4 and Xbox One, all previously purchased downloadable content for Rock Band 3 and earlier is forward compatible (with the exception of any downloadable content purchased for The Beatles: Rock Band) within the same system family at no additional cost.

== List of songs released in 2010 ==
The following table lists the available songs for the Rock Band series released in 2010. All songs available in packs are also available as individual song downloads on the same date, unless otherwise noted. New songs are released on Tuesdays for Xbox Live, PlayStation Network, and Nintendo WFC, unless otherwise noted. Dates listed are the initial release of songs on Xbox Live. Starting May 20, 2008, all downloadable songs are available in both the North American and European markets, unless otherwise noted.

Some songs released before Rock Band 3 have been retrofitted to include Rock Band 3 features, including backing vocals, and the ability to buy an additional pack for Pro Guitar/Bass charts without having to buy the "RB3 Version" of the song. Certain songs have been marked "family friendly" by Harmonix; such songs released before Rock Band 3's launch on October 26, 2010 can be played in Lego Rock Band.

Starting October 26 (with The Doors), all new songs are only playable in Rock Band 3, due to a change in the file format. All songs released via downloadable content are playable in Rock Band 3, and support its new Pro Drum mode. Most songs released for Rock Band 3 include core features for keyboards, Pro Keyboards, and backing vocals in the core song, where they are appropriate. Additionally, some of these songs features charts for Pro Guitar and Bass that can also be purchased.

As of October 2009, over 800 songs have been made available as downloadable content (DLC). As of October 19, 2009, over 60 million downloadable song purchases have been made by players. The following is a list of the songs that have been released in 2010.

Song title	Artist	Year	Genre	Single / Pack name	Release date	Family Friendly	Additional Rock Band 3 Features
"Band on the Run" (Live) (Note: Song is no longer available for purchase.)	Paul McCartney	2009	Classic Rock	Paul McCartney New York City 01	Jan 5, 2010	Yes	None
"Jet" (Live)	Paul McCartney	2009	Classic Rock	Paul McCartney New York City 01	Jan 5, 2010	Yes	None
"Sing the Changes" (Live)	Paul McCartney	2009	Classic Rock	Paul McCartney New York City 01	Jan 5, 2010	Yes	None
"Adam's Song"	Blink-182	1999	Punk	Blink-182 02	Jan 5, 2010	No	None
"First Date"	Blink-182	2001	Punk	Blink-182 02	Jan 5, 2010	Yes	None
"I Miss You"	Blink-182	2003	Punk	Blink-182 02	Jan 5, 2010	No	None
"Love My Way"	The Psychedelic Furs	1982	New Wave	Single	Jan 5, 2010	Yes	None
"Sister Europe"	The Psychedelic Furs	1980	New Wave	Single	Jan 5, 2010	No	None
"Rock 'n' Roll High School"	Ramones	1978	Punk	Single	Jan 5, 2010	Yes	None
"Grind"	Alice in Chains	1995	Grunge	Alice in Chains 02	Jan 12, 2010	No	None
"Heaven Beside You"	Alice in Chains	1995	Grunge	Alice in Chains 02	Jan 12, 2010	No	None
"Last of My Kind"	Alice in Chains	2009	Grunge	Alice in Chains 02	Jan 12, 2010	No	None
"We Die Young"	Alice in Chains	1990	Grunge	Alice in Chains 02	Jan 12, 2010	No	None
"Your Decision"	Alice in Chains	2009	Grunge	Alice in Chains 02	Jan 12, 2010	No	None
"A Woman in Love (It's Not Me)" (Live)	Tom Petty and the Heartbreakers	2009	Rock	Tom Petty & the Heartbreakers Live Anthology 02	Jan 19, 2010	Yes	None
"Breakdown" (Live)	Tom Petty and the Heartbreakers	2009	Rock	Tom Petty & the Heartbreakers Live Anthology 02	Jan 19, 2010	Yes	None
"Century City" (Live)	Tom Petty and the Heartbreakers	2009	Rock	Tom Petty & the Heartbreakers Live Anthology 02	Jan 19, 2010	Yes	None
"Jammin' Me" (Live)	Tom Petty and the Heartbreakers	2009	Rock	Tom Petty & the Heartbreakers Live Anthology 02	Jan 19, 2010	No	None
"Nightwatchman" (Live)	Tom Petty and the Heartbreakers	2009	Rock	Tom Petty & the Heartbreakers Live Anthology 02	Jan 19, 2010	No	None
"The Waiting" (Live)	Tom Petty and the Heartbreakers	2009	Rock	Tom Petty & the Heartbreakers Live Anthology 02	Jan 19, 2010	Yes	None
"1901"	Phoenix	2009	Alternative	Single	Jan 19, 2010	Yes	None
"Lisztomania"	Phoenix	2009	Alternative	Single	Jan 19, 2010	Yes	None
"Blue Jeans"	Silvertide	2004	Rock	Single	Jan 19, 2010	No	None
"Bulls on Parade"	Rage Against the Machine	1996	Alternative	Single	Jan 26, 2010	No	None
"Hair of the Dog"	Nazareth	1975	Classic Rock	Single	Jan 26, 2010	No	None
"Killed by Death '08"	Motörhead	2008	Metal	Single	Jan 26, 2010	No	None
"Levitate"	I Mother Earth	1993	Alternative	Single	Jan 26, 2010	No	None
"Master of the Universe"	Hawkwind	1971	Rock	Single	Jan 26, 2010	No	None
"Transmaniacon MC"	Blue Öyster Cult	1972	Classic Rock	Single	Jan 26, 2010	No	None
"Godzilla"	Blue Öyster Cult	1977	Classic Rock	Single	Jan 26, 2010	Yes	None
"Gone"	Montgomery Gentry	2004	Country	Going Country 03	Feb 2, 2010	No	None
"Me and My Gang"	Rascal Flatts	2006	Country	Going Country 03	Feb 2, 2010	No	None
"On the Road Again"	Willie Nelson	1980	Country	Going Country 03	Feb 2, 2010	No	None
"She Thinks My Tractor's Sexy"	Kenny Chesney	1999	Country	Going Country 03	Feb 2, 2010	No	None
"Swing"	Trace Adkins	2006	Country	Going Country 03	Feb 2, 2010	No	None
"Suds in the Bucket"	Sara Evans	2003	Country	Going Country 03	Feb 2, 2010	No	None
"The Who Super Bowl S-mashup"	The Who	2010	Classic Rock	Single	Feb 7, 2010	Yes	None
"Holy Wars... The Punishment Due"	Megadeth	1990	Metal	Rust in Peace	Feb 9, 2010	No	None
"Hangar 18"	Megadeth	1990	Metal	Rust in Peace	Feb 9, 2010	Yes	None
"Take No Prisoners"	Megadeth	1990	Metal	Rust in Peace	Feb 9, 2010	No	None
"Five Magics"	Megadeth	1990	Metal	Rust in Peace	Feb 9, 2010	No	None
"Poison Was the Cure"	Megadeth	1990	Metal	Rust in Peace	Feb 9, 2010	No	None
"Lucretia"	Megadeth	1990	Metal	Rust in Peace	Feb 9, 2010	No	None
"Tornado of Souls"	Megadeth	1990	Metal	Rust in Peace	Feb 9, 2010	No	None
"Dawn Patrol"	Megadeth	1990	Metal	Rust in Peace	Feb 9, 2010	Yes	None
"Rust In Peace... Polaris"	Megadeth	1990	Metal	Rust in Peace	Feb 9, 2010	No	None
"(Sittin' on the) Dock of the Bay" (Take 2)	Otis Redding	1967	R&B/Soul/Funk	Otis Redding 01	Feb 16, 2010	Yes	None
"Fa-Fa-Fa-Fa-Fa (Sad Song)"	Otis Redding	1966	R&B/Soul/Funk	Otis Redding 01	Feb 16, 2010	Yes	None
"I'm Sick Y'all"	Otis Redding	1966	R&B/Soul/Funk	Otis Redding 01	Feb 16, 2010	Yes	None
"I've Got Dreams to Remember"	Otis Redding	1968	R&B/Soul/Funk	Otis Redding 01	Feb 16, 2010	Yes	None
"Love Man"	Otis Redding	1969	R&B/Soul/Funk	Otis Redding 01	Feb 16, 2010	No	None
"Weightless"	All Time Low	2009	Emo	Single	Feb 16, 2010	No	None
"Fascination"	Alphabeat	2007	Pop-Rock	Single	Feb 16, 2010	Yes	None
"Stray Cat Strut"	Brian Setzer	1982	Rock	Single	Feb 16, 2010	Yes	None
"Let Forever Be"	The Chemical Brothers	1998	Pop/Dance/Electronic	Single	Feb 16, 2010	Yes	None
"Heartkiller"	HIM	2010	Alternative	HIM 01	Feb 23, 2010	Yes	None
"Ode to Solitude"	HIM	2010	Alternative	HIM 01	Feb 23, 2010	No	None
"Wings of a Butterfly"	HIM	2005	Alternative	HIM 01	Feb 23, 2010	No	None
"Distracted"	KSM	2009	Pop-Rock	Single	Feb 23, 2010	Yes	None
"The Dope Show"	Marilyn Manson	1998	Metal	Single	Feb 23, 2010	No	None
"Just for Tonight"	One Night Only	2008	Pop-Rock	Single	Feb 23, 2010	Yes	None
"Walking on the Moon"	The Police	1979	Rock	Single	Feb 23, 2010	Yes	None
"Meaning of Life"	Disturbed	2000	Nu-Metal	Disturbed 02	Mar 2, 2010	No	None
"The Game"	Disturbed	2000	Nu-Metal	Disturbed 02	Mar 2, 2010	No	None
"Voices"	Disturbed	2000	Nu-Metal	Disturbed 02	Mar 2, 2010	No	None
"Third Floor Story" (Note: Song costs US$0.99 (80 MSP/100 Wii Points).)	The Mother Hips	2009	Rock	Single	Mar 2, 2010	No	None
"White Falcon Fuzz"	The Mother Hips	2009	Rock	Single	Mar 2, 2010	Yes	None
"Panic Switch"	Silversun Pickups	2009	Indie Rock	Single	Mar 2, 2010	No	None
"Sort Of"	Silversun Pickups	2009	Indie Rock	Single	Mar 2, 2010	Yes	None
"Downfall"	TRUSTCompany	2002	Nu-Metal	Single	Mar 2, 2010	Yes	None
"Decent Days and Nights"	The Futureheads	2004	Punk	Single	Mar 9, 2010	Yes	None
"Hounds of Love"	The Futureheads	2004	Punk	Single	Mar 9, 2010	Yes	None
"Walk Away" (Alternate Studio Version)	James Gang	1971	Classic Rock	Single	Mar 9, 2010	Yes	None
"The Hockey Theme"	Neil Peart	2010	Novelty	Single	Mar 9, 2010	Yes	None
"All of This"	Shaimus	2006	Indie Rock	Single	Mar 9, 2010	Yes	None
"Tie You Down"	Shaimus	2008	Indie Rock	Single	Mar 9, 2010	Yes	None
"Fell in Love with a Girl"	The White Stripes	2001	Rock	The White Stripes 02	Mar 9, 2010	Yes	None
"Seven Nation Army"	The White Stripes	2003	Rock	The White Stripes 02	Mar 9, 2010	No	None
"You Don't Know What Love Is (You Just Do as You're Told)"	The White Stripes	2007	Rock	The White Stripes 02	Mar 9, 2010	Yes	None
"Bad Romance"	Lady Gaga	2009	Pop/Dance/Electronic	Lady Gaga 01	Mar 16, 2010	No	None
"Monster"	Lady Gaga	2009	Pop/Dance/Electronic	Lady Gaga 01	Mar 16, 2010	No	None
"Poker Face"	Lady Gaga	2008	Pop/Dance/Electronic	Lady Gaga 01	Mar 16, 2010	No	None
"Just Dance"	Lady Gaga	2008	Pop/Dance/Electronic	Lady Gaga 01	Mar 16, 2010	No	None
"Lady Gaga's Poker Face" (South Park Version)	Eric Cartman	2009	Novelty	Single	Mar 16, 2010	No	None
"It's Not My Time"	3 Doors Down	2008	Rock	Single	Mar 16, 2010	Yes	None
"Control"	Mutemath	2006	Alternative	Single	Mar 16, 2010	Yes	None
"Oh Yeah"	The Subways	2005	Alternative	Single	Mar 16, 2010	No	None
"Rock & Roll Queen"	The Subways	2005	Alternative	Single	Mar 16, 2010	Yes	None
"Blue Spark"	X	1982	Punk	X 01	Mar 23, 2010	Yes	None
"The Hungry Wolf"	X	1982	Punk	X 01	Mar 23, 2010	No	None
"I Must Not Think Bad Thoughts"	X	1983	Punk	X 01	Mar 23, 2010	No	None
"Los Angeles"	X	1980	Punk	X 01	Mar 23, 2010	No	None
"Am I Crazy" (Note: Song is available at no cost.) (Note: Song is not available for the Wii platform.)	Little Fish	2010	Indie Rock	Single	Mar 23, 2010	Yes	None
"Bang Bang"	Little Fish	2010	Indie Rock	Single	Mar 23, 2010	No	None
"Darling Dear"	Little Fish	2010	Indie Rock	Single	Mar 23, 2010	No	None
"Outer Space"	Ace Frehley	2009	Metal	Single	Mar 23, 2010	No	None
"All-American Girl"	Carrie Underwood	2007	Country	Single	Mar 23, 2010	Yes	None
"Stop & Stare"	OneRepublic	2007	Pop-Rock	Single	Mar 23, 2010	Yes	None
"Up From the Skies"	The Jimi Hendrix Experience	1967	Classic Rock	Axis: Bold as Love	Mar 30, 2010	Yes	None
"Spanish Castle Magic"	The Jimi Hendrix Experience	1967	Classic Rock	Axis: Bold as Love	Mar 30, 2010	Yes	None
"Wait Until Tomorrow"	The Jimi Hendrix Experience	1967	Classic Rock	Axis: Bold as Love	Mar 30, 2010	Yes	None
"Ain't No Telling"	The Jimi Hendrix Experience	1967	Classic Rock	Axis: Bold as Love	Mar 30, 2010	Yes	None
"Little Wing"	The Jimi Hendrix Experience	1967	Classic Rock	Axis: Bold as Love	Mar 30, 2010	Yes	Pro Guitar/Bass
"If 6 Was 9"	The Jimi Hendrix Experience	1967	Classic Rock	Axis: Bold as Love	Mar 30, 2010	Yes	None
"You Got Me Floatin'"	The Jimi Hendrix Experience	1967	Classic Rock	Axis: Bold as Love	Mar 30, 2010	Yes	None
"Castles Made of Sand"	The Jimi Hendrix Experience	1967	Classic Rock	Axis: Bold as Love	Mar 30, 2010	No	None
"She's So Fine"	The Jimi Hendrix Experience	1967	Classic Rock	Axis: Bold as Love	Mar 30, 2010	Yes	None
"One Rainy Wish"	The Jimi Hendrix Experience	1967	Classic Rock	Axis: Bold as Love	Mar 30, 2010	Yes	None
"Little Miss Lover"	The Jimi Hendrix Experience	1967	Classic Rock	Axis: Bold as Love	Mar 30, 2010	No	None
"Bold as Love"	The Jimi Hendrix Experience	1967	Classic Rock	Axis: Bold as Love	Mar 30, 2010	Yes	None
"Valleys of Neptune"	Jimi Hendrix	2010	Classic Rock	Single	Mar 30, 2010	Yes	None
"Feel Good Drag"	Anberlin	2008	Alternative	Single	Apr 6, 2010	No	None
"Live Life Loud"	Hawk Nelson	2009	Pop-Rock	Single	Apr 6, 2010	Yes	None
"Monster"	Skillet	2009	Rock	Single	Apr 6, 2010	Yes	None
"Stand in the Rain"	Superchick	2006	Pop-Rock	Single	Apr 6, 2010	Yes	None
"Meant to Live"	Switchfoot	2003	Alternative	Single	Apr 6, 2010	Yes	None
"Fire It Up"	Thousand Foot Krutch	2009	Nu-Metal	Single	Apr 6, 2010	Yes	None
"Empty Walls"	Serj Tankian	2007	Nu-Metal	Single	Apr 13, 2010	No	None
"Sky Is Over"	Serj Tankian	2007	Nu-Metal	Single	Apr 13, 2010	No	None
"All Star"	Smash Mouth	1999	Pop-Rock	Single	Apr 13, 2010	Yes	None
"Blood on My Hands"	The Used	2009	Emo	The Used 01	Apr 13, 2010	No	None
"Born to Quit"	The Used	2009	Emo	The Used 01	Apr 13, 2010	No	None
"The Taste of Ink"	The Used	2002	Emo	The Used 01	Apr 13, 2010	No	None
"Guns of Summer"	Coheed and Cambria	2010	Prog	Coheed and Cambria 01	Apr 20, 2010	Yes	None
"Here We Are Juggernaut"	Coheed and Cambria	2010	Prog	Coheed and Cambria 01	Apr 20, 2010	No	None
"The Broken"	Coheed and Cambria	2010	Prog	Coheed and Cambria 01	Apr 20, 2010	Yes	None
"Peek-a-Boo"	Siouxsie and The Banshees	1988	Pop-Rock	Single	Apr 20, 2010	No	None
"Sun Hits the Sky"	Supergrass	1997	Alternative	Single	Apr 20, 2010	Yes	None
"American Music"	Violent Femmes	1991	Alternative	Single	Apr 20, 2010	No	None
"Again"	Flyleaf	2009	Nu-Metal	Single	Apr 27, 2010	Yes	None
"Tomorrow"	Silverchair	1995	Alternative	Single	Apr 27, 2010	Yes	None
"Thunderbirds Are Go!"	Busted	2004	Pop-Rock	Single	Apr 27, 2010	Yes	None
"Different People"	No Doubt	1995	Pop-Rock	Tragic Kingdom: The Deep Cuts (Note: Song is also available as part of "No Doubt Tragic Kingdom: The Complete Album".)	May 4, 2010	Yes	None
"End It on This"	No Doubt	1995	Pop-Rock	Tragic Kingdom: The Deep Cuts	May 4, 2010	Yes	None
"Happy Now?"	No Doubt	1995	Pop-Rock	Tragic Kingdom: The Deep Cuts	May 4, 2010	Yes	None
"Hey You"	No Doubt	1995	Pop-Rock	Tragic Kingdom: The Deep Cuts	May 4, 2010	Yes	None
"Sixteen"	No Doubt	1995	Pop-Rock	Tragic Kingdom: The Deep Cuts	May 4, 2010	Yes	None
"The Climb"	No Doubt	1995	Pop-Rock	Tragic Kingdom: The Deep Cuts	May 4, 2010	Yes	None
"Tragic Kingdom"	No Doubt	1995	Pop-Rock	Tragic Kingdom: The Deep Cuts	May 4, 2010	Yes	None
"World Go 'Round"	No Doubt	1995	Pop-Rock	Tragic Kingdom: The Deep Cuts	May 4, 2010	Yes	None
"You Can Do It"	No Doubt	1995	Pop-Rock	Tragic Kingdom: The Deep Cuts	May 4, 2010	No	None
"According to You"	Orianthi	2009	Pop-Rock	Single	May 4, 2010	Yes	None
"Dearest (I'm So Sorry)"	Picture Me Broken	2010	Metal	Single	May 4, 2010	No	None
"Breaking the Law" (Live)	Judas Priest	2010	Metal	British Steel 30th Anniversary	May 11, 2010	Yes	None
"Rapid Fire" (Live)	Judas Priest	2010	Metal	British Steel 30th Anniversary	May 11, 2010	Yes	None
"Metal Gods" (Live)	Judas Priest	2010	Metal	British Steel 30th Anniversary	May 11, 2010	No	None
"Grinder" (Live)	Judas Priest	2010	Metal	British Steel 30th Anniversary	May 11, 2010	Yes	None
"United" (Live)	Judas Priest	2010	Metal	British Steel 30th Anniversary	May 11, 2010	Yes	None
"Living After Midnight" (Live)	Judas Priest	2010	Metal	British Steel 30th Anniversary	May 11, 2010	No	None
"You Don't Have to Be Old to Be Wise" (Live)	Judas Priest	2010	Metal	British Steel 30th Anniversary	May 11, 2010	No	None
"The Rage" (Live)	Judas Priest	2010	Metal	British Steel 30th Anniversary	May 11, 2010	Yes	None
"Steeler" (Live)	Judas Priest	2010	Metal	British Steel 30th Anniversary	May 11, 2010	Yes	None
"Beat It on Down the Line"	Grateful Dead	1967	Classic Rock	Grateful Dead 03	May 18, 2010	Yes	None
"Cumberland Blues"	Grateful Dead	1970	Classic Rock	Grateful Dead 03	May 18, 2010	Yes	None
"Scarlet Begonias"	Grateful Dead	1974	Classic Rock	Grateful Dead 03	May 18, 2010	Yes	None
"Throwing Stones"	Grateful Dead	1987	Classic Rock	Grateful Dead 03	May 18, 2010	No	None
"Touch of Grey"	Grateful Dead	1987	Classic Rock	Grateful Dead 03	May 18, 2010	Yes	None
"U.S. Blues"	Grateful Dead	1974	Classic Rock	Grateful Dead 03	May 18, 2010	Yes	None
"A Girl Like You"	The Smithereens	1989	Rock	Single	May 18, 2010	No	None
"Only a Memory"	The Smithereens	1988	Rock	Single	May 18, 2010	Yes	None
"The Great Southern Trendkill"	Pantera	1996	Metal	The Great Southern Trendkill	May 25, 2010	No	None
"War Nerve"	Pantera	1996	Metal	The Great Southern Trendkill	May 25, 2010	No	None
"Drag the Waters"	Pantera	1996	Metal	The Great Southern Trendkill	May 25, 2010	No	None
"10s"	Pantera	1996	Metal	The Great Southern Trendkill	May 25, 2010	No	None
"13 Steps to Nowhere"	Pantera	1996	Metal	The Great Southern Trendkill	May 25, 2010	No	None
"Suicide Note Pt. II"	Pantera	1996	Metal	The Great Southern Trendkill	May 25, 2010	No	None
"Living Through Me (Hell's Wrath)"	Pantera	1996	Metal	The Great Southern Trendkill	May 25, 2010	No	None
"Floods"	Pantera	1996	Metal	The Great Southern Trendkill	May 25, 2010	No	None
"The Underground in America"	Pantera	1996	Metal	The Great Southern Trendkill	May 25, 2010	No	None
"(Reprise) Sandblasted Skin"	Pantera	1996	Metal	The Great Southern Trendkill	May 25, 2010	No	None
"Alive"	P.O.D.	2001	Nu-Metal	Single	Jun 1, 2010	No	None
"Trouble Comes Running"	Spoon	2010	Indie Rock	Spoon 01	Jun 1, 2010	No	None
"Don't You Evah"	Spoon	2007	Indie Rock	Spoon 01	Jun 1, 2010	No	None
"I Turn My Camera On"	Spoon	2005	Indie Rock	Spoon 01	Jun 1, 2010	No	None
"Got Nuffin"	Spoon	2010	Indie Rock	Spoon 01	Jun 1, 2010	No	None
"Cherry Waves"	Deftones	2006	Nu-Metal	Deftones 01	Jun 8, 2010	No	None
"Hole in the Earth"	Deftones	2006	Nu-Metal	Deftones 01	Jun 8, 2010	No	None
"Minerva"	Deftones	2003	Nu-Metal	Deftones 01	Jun 8, 2010	No	None
"The Great Escape"	Boys Like Girls	2006	Emo	Single	Jun 8, 2010	No	None
"Rock Ready"	Crown of Thorns	2009	Rock	Single	Jun 8, 2010	No	None
"Crazy Babies"	Ozzy Osbourne	1988	Metal	Ozzy Osbourne 01	Jun 15, 2010	Yes	None
"Diggin' Me Down"	Ozzy Osbourne	2010	Metal	Ozzy Osbourne 01	Jun 15, 2010	No	None
"I Don't Wanna Stop"	Ozzy Osbourne	2007	Metal	Ozzy Osbourne 01	Jun 15, 2010	No	None
"Let Me Hear You Scream"	Ozzy Osbourne	2010	Metal	Ozzy Osbourne 01	Jun 15, 2010	No	None
"No More Tears"	Ozzy Osbourne	1991	Metal	Ozzy Osbourne 01	Jun 15, 2010	Yes	None
"Soul Sucker"	Ozzy Osbourne	2010	Metal	Ozzy Osbourne 01	Jun 15, 2010	Yes	None
"Can't Be Tamed"	Miley Cyrus	2010	Pop/Dance/Electronic	Miley Cyrus 01 (Note: Song is available as individual tracks for all consoles but is only available as a pack for the Xbox 360.)	Jun 22, 2010	No	None
"7 Things"	Miley Cyrus	2008	Pop/Dance/Electronic	Miley Cyrus 01	Jun 22, 2010	Yes	None
"Fly on the Wall"	Miley Cyrus	2008	Pop/Dance/Electronic	Miley Cyrus 01	Jun 22, 2010	Yes	None
"See You Again"	Miley Cyrus	2007	Pop/Dance/Electronic	Miley Cyrus 01	Jun 22, 2010	Yes	None
"Start All Over"	Miley Cyrus	2007	Pop/Dance/Electronic	Miley Cyrus 01	Jun 22, 2010	Yes	None
"Burn It to the Ground"	Nickelback	2008	Rock	Nickelback 01	Jun 29, 2010	No	None
"Figured You Out"	Nickelback	2003	Rock	Nickelback 01	Jun 29, 2010	No	None
"Never Again"	Nickelback	2001	Rock	Nickelback 01	Jun 29, 2010	No	None
"Photograph"	Nickelback	2005	Rock	Nickelback 01	Jun 29, 2010	No	None
"Rockstar"	Nickelback	2005	Rock	Nickelback 01	Jun 29, 2010	No	None
"This Afternoon"	Nickelback	2008	Rock	Nickelback 01	Jun 29, 2010	No	None
"Bad Moon Rising"	Creedence Clearwater Revival	1969	Southern Rock	Creedence Clearwater Revival 01	Jul 6, 2010	Yes	Pro Guitar/Bass
"Born on the Bayou"	Creedence Clearwater Revival	1969	Southern Rock	Creedence Clearwater Revival 01	Jul 6, 2010	Yes	None
"Down on the Corner"	Creedence Clearwater Revival	1969	Southern Rock	Creedence Clearwater Revival 01	Jul 6, 2010	Yes	None
"Fortunate Son" (Original Version)	Creedence Clearwater Revival	1969	Southern Rock	Creedence Clearwater Revival 01	Jul 6, 2010	Yes	Pro Guitar/Bass
"Green River"	Creedence Clearwater Revival	1969	Southern Rock	Creedence Clearwater Revival 01	Jul 6, 2010	Yes	None
"I Heard It Through the Grapevine"	Creedence Clearwater Revival	1970	Southern Rock	Creedence Clearwater Revival 01	Jul 6, 2010	Yes	None
"Lookin' Out My Back Door"	Creedence Clearwater Revival	1970	Southern Rock	Creedence Clearwater Revival 01	Jul 6, 2010	Yes	None
"Proud Mary"	Creedence Clearwater Revival	1969	Southern Rock	Creedence Clearwater Revival 01	Jul 6, 2010	Yes	None
"Run Through the Jungle"	Creedence Clearwater Revival	1970	Southern Rock	Creedence Clearwater Revival 01	Jul 6, 2010	No	None
"Travelin' Band"	Creedence Clearwater Revival	1970	Southern Rock	Creedence Clearwater Revival 01	Jul 6, 2010	Yes	None
"Up Around the Bend"	Creedence Clearwater Revival	1970	Southern Rock	Creedence Clearwater Revival 01	Jul 6, 2010	Yes	None
"Who'll Stop the Rain"	Creedence Clearwater Revival	1970	Southern Rock	Creedence Clearwater Revival 01	Jul 6, 2010	Yes	None
"Get Out"	The Vines	2008	Rock	The Vines 01	Jul 13, 2010	No	None
"He's a Rocker"	The Vines	2008	Rock	The Vines 01	Jul 13, 2010	No	None
"Orange Amber"	The Vines	2008	Rock	The Vines 01	Jul 13, 2010	Yes	None
"Outtathaway"	The Vines	2002	Rock	The Vines 01	Jul 13, 2010	Yes	None
"Ride"	The Vines	2004	Rock	The Vines 01	Jul 13, 2010	Yes	None
"Future Perfect Tense"	Sweet Billy Pilgrim	2009	Indie Rock	Single	Jul 13, 2010	Yes	None
"New Dark Ages"	Bad Religion	2007	Punk	Single	Jul 20, 2010	No	None
"No Control"	Bad Religion	1989	Punk	Single	Jul 20, 2010	Yes	None
"1969"	The Stooges	1969	Rock	The Stooges 01	Jul 20, 2010	Yes	None
"I Wanna Be Your Dog"	The Stooges	1969	Rock	The Stooges 01	Jul 20, 2010	Yes	None
"No Fun"	The Stooges	1969	Rock	The Stooges 01	Jul 20, 2010	Yes	None
"A Dios le Pido"	Juanes	2002	Pop-Rock	Juanes 01	Jul 27, 2010	No	None
"Fíjate Bien"	Juanes	2000	Pop-Rock	Juanes 01	Jul 27, 2010	No	None
"Gotas de Agua Dulce"	Juanes	2007	Pop-Rock	Juanes 01	Jul 27, 2010	No	None
"La Camisa Negra"	Juanes	2004	Pop-Rock	Juanes 01	Jul 27, 2010	No	None
"Mala Gente"	Juanes	2002	Pop-Rock	Juanes 01	Jul 27, 2010	No	None
"Yerbatero"	Juanes	2010	Pop-Rock	Juanes 01	Jul 27, 2010	No	None
"Nightmare"	Avenged Sevenfold	2010	Metal	Avenged Sevenfold 01	Jul 27, 2010	No	None
"Seize the Day"	Avenged Sevenfold	2005	Metal	Avenged Sevenfold 01	Jul 27, 2010	No	None
"Scream"	Avenged Sevenfold	2007	Metal	Avenged Sevenfold 01	Jul 27, 2010	No	None
"Rapture"	Blondie	1980	New Wave	Single	Aug 3, 2010	No	None
"Jesus Freak"	DC Talk	1995	Alternative	Single	Aug 3, 2010	No	None
"The Perfect Crime #2"	The Decemberists	2006	Indie Rock	Single	Aug 3, 2010	No	None
"I Only Want You"	Eagles of Death Metal	2004	Rock	Single	Aug 3, 2010	Yes	None
"Saturday Morning"	Eels	2003	Indie Rock	Single	Aug 3, 2010	Yes	None
"Love Addict"	Family Force 5	2006	Rock	Single	Aug 3, 2010	No	None
"Sturm & Drang"	KMFDM	2002	Metal	Single	Aug 3, 2010	No	None
"Bulletproof"	La Roux	2009	Pop/Dance/Electronic	Single	Aug 3, 2010	Yes	None
"Jesus Built My Hotrod"	Ministry	1992	Metal	Ministry 02	Aug 10, 2010	No	None
"Stigmata"	Ministry	1988	Metal	Ministry 02	Aug 10, 2010	No	None
"Thieves"	Ministry	1989	Metal	Ministry 02	Aug 10, 2010	No	None
"Strange Times"	The Black Keys	2008	Rock	The Black Keys 01	Aug 17, 2010	No	None
"I Got Mine"	The Black Keys	2008	Rock	The Black Keys 01	Aug 17, 2010	No	None
"Your Touch"	The Black Keys	2006	Rock	The Black Keys 01	Aug 17, 2010	No	None
"Animal"	Neon Trees	2010	Pop-Rock	Neon Trees 01	Aug 17, 2010	No	None
"Sins of My Youth"	Neon Trees	2010	Pop-Rock	Neon Trees 01	Aug 17, 2010	No	None
"1983"	Neon Trees	2010	Pop-Rock	Neon Trees 01	Aug 17, 2010	No	None
"Asylum"	Disturbed	2010	Nu-Metal	Disturbed 03	Aug 24, 2010	No	None
"The Animal"	Disturbed	2010	Nu-Metal	Disturbed 03	Aug 24, 2010	No	None
"Another Way to Die"	Disturbed	2010	Nu-Metal	Disturbed 03	Aug 24, 2010	No	None
"Mountain Man"	Crash Kings	2009	Rock	Universal Motown Republic Rock 01	Aug 24, 2010	No	None
"Seasons"	The Veer Union	2009	Rock	Universal Motown Republic Rock 01	Aug 24, 2010	Yes	None
"Bury Me Alive"	We Are The Fallen	2010	Metal	Universal Motown Republic Rock 01	Aug 24, 2010	No	None
"What Was I Thinkin'"	Dierks Bentley	2003	Country	Going Country 04	Aug 31, 2010	No	None
"Hell on the Heart"	Eric Church	2009	Country	Going Country 04	Aug 31, 2010	No	None
"Women"	Jamey Johnson	2008	Country	Going Country 04	Aug 31, 2010	No	None
"Would You Go With Me"	Josh Turner	2006	Country	Going Country 04	Aug 31, 2010	No	None
"Days Go By"	Keith Urban	2004	Country	Going Country 04	Aug 31, 2010	No	None
"Lookin' for a Good Time"	Lady Antebellum	2008	Country	Going Country 04	Aug 31, 2010	No	None
"Rebound"	Laura Bell Bundy	2010	Country	Going Country 04	Aug 31, 2010	No	None
"Fancy"	Reba McEntire	1990	Country	Going Country 04	Aug 31, 2010	No	None
"It Happens"	Sugarland	2008	Country	Going Country 04	Aug 31, 2010	No	None
"Rock Band Network Megamix 01" (Note: Song is only available for the Xbox platform.)	Various Artists	2010	Other	Single	Aug 31, 2010	No	None
"Beautiful" (Rock Band Mix)	Snoop Dogg	2010	Hip-Hop/Rap	Snoop Dogg 01	Sep 7, 2010	No	None
"Drop It Like It's Hot" (Rock Band Mix)	Snoop Dogg	2010	Hip-Hop/Rap	Snoop Dogg 01	Sep 7, 2010	No	None
"Ridin' in My Chevy" (Rock Band Mix)	Snoop Dogg	2010	Hip-Hop/Rap	Snoop Dogg 01	Sep 7, 2010	No	None
"Sensual Seduction" (Rock Band Mix)	Snoop Dogg	2010	Hip-Hop/Rap	Snoop Dogg 01	Sep 7, 2010	No	None
"Snoop's Upside Ya Head" (Rock Band Re-Record)	Snoop Dogg	2010	Hip-Hop/Rap	Snoop Dogg 01	Sep 7, 2010	No	None
"Tha Shiznit" (Rock Band Re-Record)	Snoop Dogg	2010	Hip-Hop/Rap	Snoop Dogg 01	Sep 7, 2010	No	None
"That's tha Homie" (Rock Band Mix)	Snoop Dogg	2010	Hip-Hop/Rap	Snoop Dogg 01	Sep 7, 2010	No	None
"Who Am I (What's My Name)?" (Rock Band Re-Record)	Snoop Dogg	2010	Hip-Hop/Rap	Snoop Dogg 01	Sep 7, 2010	No	None
"Holy Diver"	Dio	1983	Metal	Single	Sep 14, 2010	Yes	None
"Stand Up and Shout"	Dio	1983	Metal	Single	Sep 14, 2010	Yes	None
"Nirvana"	Juliana Hatfield	1992	Indie Rock	Single	Sep 14, 2010	No	None
"Irish Blood, English Heart"	Morrissey	2004	Indie Rock	Single	Sep 14, 2010	No	None
"Straight Lines"	Silverchair	2007	Alternative	Single	Sep 14, 2010	No	None
"This Charming Man"	The Smiths	1987	Indie Rock	Single	Sep 14, 2010	Yes	None
"Writing on the Walls"	Underoath	2006	Emo	Single	Sep 14, 2010	No	None
"Is This Love"	Bob Marley and the Wailers	1978	Reggae/Ska	Legend	Sep 21, 2010	Yes	None
"No Woman, No Cry"	Bob Marley and the Wailers	1975	Reggae/Ska	Legend	Sep 21, 2010	Yes	None
"Could You Be Loved"	Bob Marley and the Wailers	1980	Reggae/Ska	Legend	Sep 21, 2010	No	None
"Three Little Birds"	Bob Marley and the Wailers	1977	Reggae/Ska	Legend	Sep 21, 2010	Yes	None
"Buffalo Soldier"	Bob Marley and the Wailers	1983	Reggae/Ska	Legend	Sep 21, 2010	No	None
"Stir It Up"	Bob Marley and the Wailers	1973	Reggae/Ska	Legend	Sep 21, 2010	No	None
"One Love/People Get Ready"	Bob Marley and the Wailers	1977	Reggae/Ska	Legend	Sep 21, 2010	No	None
"I Shot the Sheriff"	Bob Marley and the Wailers	1973	Reggae/Ska	Legend	Sep 21, 2010	No	None
"Waiting in Vain"	Bob Marley and the Wailers	1977	Reggae/Ska	Legend	Sep 21, 2010	Yes	None
"Redemption Song"	Bob Marley and the Wailers	1980	Reggae/Ska	Legend	Sep 21, 2010	No	None
"Satisfy My Soul"	Bob Marley and the Wailers	1978	Reggae/Ska	Legend	Sep 21, 2010	Yes	None
"Exodus"	Bob Marley and the Wailers	1977	Reggae/Ska	Legend	Sep 21, 2010	No	None
"Jamming"	Bob Marley and the Wailers	1977	Reggae/Ska	Legend	Sep 21, 2010	No	None
"Among The Living"	Anthrax	1987	Metal	Anthrax 01	Sep 28, 2010	No	None
"I'm the Man"	Anthrax	1987	Metal	Anthrax 01	Sep 28, 2010	No	None
"Indians"	Anthrax	1987	Metal	Anthrax 01	Sep 28, 2010	Yes	None
"Madhouse" (Live)	Anthrax	1987	Metal	Anthrax 01	Sep 28, 2010	Yes	None
"Metal Thrashing Mad" (Live)	Anthrax	1987	Metal	Anthrax 01	Sep 28, 2010	Yes	None
"I'm Not Okay (I Promise)"	My Chemical Romance	2004	Emo	Single	Sep 28, 2010	No	None
"Welcome to the Black Parade"	My Chemical Romance	2006	Emo	Single	Sep 28, 2010	No	None
"Closer to the Edge"	30 Seconds to Mars	2009	Emo	Single	Sep 28, 2010	Yes	None
"Coffin Nails"	Atreyu	2009	Metal	Single	Sep 28, 2010	No	None
"Out of Line"	Buckcherry	2006	Rock	Single	Sep 28, 2010	No	None
"Listen to the Music"	The Doobie Brothers	1972	Classic Rock	Single	Sep 28, 2010	Yes	None
"Long Train Runnin'"	The Doobie Brothers	1973	Classic Rock	Single	Sep 28, 2010	Yes	None
"Driver 8"	R.E.M.	1985	Alternative	R.E.M. 01	Oct 5, 2010	Yes	None
"It's the End of the World as We Know It"	R.E.M.	1987	Alternative	R.E.M. 01	Oct 5, 2010	Yes	None
"Living Well Is the Best Revenge"	R.E.M.	2008	Alternative	R.E.M. 01	Oct 5, 2010	No	None
"Radio Free Europe"	R.E.M.	1983	Alternative	R.E.M. 01	Oct 5, 2010	Yes	None
"Stand"	R.E.M.	1988	Alternative	R.E.M. 01	Oct 5, 2010	Yes	None
"Superman"	R.E.M.	1986	Alternative	R.E.M. 01	Oct 5, 2010	Yes	None
"These Days"	R.E.M.	1986	Alternative	R.E.M. 01	Oct 5, 2010	Yes	None
"What's the Frequency, Kenneth?"	R.E.M.	1994	Alternative	R.E.M. 01	Oct 5, 2010	No	None
"Children of the Revolution"	T. Rex	1973	Glam	T. Rex 01	Oct 5, 2010	Yes	None
"Cosmic Dancer"	T. Rex	1971	Glam	T. Rex 01	Oct 5, 2010	Yes	None
"Jeepster"	T. Rex	1971	Glam	T. Rex 01	Oct 5, 2010	No	None
"Purple Haze"	The Jimi Hendrix Experience	1967	Classic Rock	Are You Experienced: Rock Band Edition	Oct 12, 2010	Yes	Pro Guitar/Bass
"Manic Depression"	The Jimi Hendrix Experience	1967	Classic Rock	Are You Experienced: Rock Band Edition	Oct 12, 2010	Yes	None
"Hey Joe" (Live)	The Jimi Hendrix Experience	1967	Classic Rock	Are You Experienced: Rock Band Edition	Oct 12, 2010	No	None
"Love or Confusion"	The Jimi Hendrix Experience	1967	Classic Rock	Are You Experienced: Rock Band Edition	Oct 12, 2010	Yes	None
"May This Be Love"	The Jimi Hendrix Experience	1967	Classic Rock	Are You Experienced: Rock Band Edition	Oct 12, 2010	Yes	None
"The Wind Cries Mary"	The Jimi Hendrix Experience	1967	Classic Rock	Are You Experienced: Rock Band Edition	Oct 12, 2010	Yes	None
"Fire" (Live)	Jimi Hendrix	1967	Classic Rock	Are You Experienced: Rock Band Edition	Oct 12, 2010	No	None
"3rd Stone from the Sun"	The Jimi Hendrix Experience	1967	Classic Rock	Are You Experienced: Rock Band Edition	Oct 12, 2010	Yes	None
"Foxey Lady"	The Jimi Hendrix Experience	1967	Classic Rock	Are You Experienced: Rock Band Edition	Oct 12, 2010	Yes	None
"Are You Experienced?"	The Jimi Hendrix Experience	1967	Classic Rock	Are You Experienced: Rock Band Edition	Oct 12, 2010	No	None
"Stone Free"	Jimi Hendrix	2010	Classic Rock	Are You Experienced: Rock Band Edition	Oct 12, 2010	Yes	None
"Highway Chile"	The Jimi Hendrix Experience	1967	Classic Rock	Are You Experienced: Rock Band Edition	Oct 12, 2010	Yes	None
"Big Empty"	Stone Temple Pilots	1994	Alternative	Stone Temple Pilots 01	Oct 19, 2010	No	None
"Crackerman"	Stone Temple Pilots	1992	Alternative	Stone Temple Pilots 01	Oct 19, 2010	No	None
"Creep"	Stone Temple Pilots	1992	Alternative	Stone Temple Pilots 01	Oct 19, 2010	No	None
"Dead & Bloated"	Stone Temple Pilots	1992	Alternative	Stone Temple Pilots 01	Oct 19, 2010	No	None
"Huckleberry Crumble"	Stone Temple Pilots	2010	Alternative	Stone Temple Pilots 01	Oct 19, 2010	No	None
"Trippin' on a Hole in a Paper Heart"	Stone Temple Pilots	1996	Alternative	Stone Temple Pilots 01	Oct 19, 2010	No	None
"Bleed American"	Jimmy Eat World	2001	Pop-Rock	Jimmy Eat World 02	Oct 19, 2010	No	None
"My Best Theory"	Jimmy Eat World	2010	Pop-Rock	Jimmy Eat World 02	Oct 19, 2010	Yes	None
"Pain"	Jimmy Eat World	2004	Pop-Rock	Jimmy Eat World 02	Oct 19, 2010	No	None
"Light My Fire"	The Doors	1967	Classic Rock	The Doors Greatest Hits: Rock Band Edition	Oct 26, 2010	Yes	Core & Pro Guitar/Bass
"Riders on the Storm"	The Doors	1971	Classic Rock	The Doors Greatest Hits: Rock Band Edition	Oct 26, 2010	Yes	Core & Pro Guitar/Bass
"Touch Me"	The Doors	1969	Classic Rock	The Doors Greatest Hits: Rock Band Edition	Oct 26, 2010	Yes	Core & Pro Guitar/Bass
"Hello, I Love You"	The Doors	1968	Classic Rock	The Doors Greatest Hits: Rock Band Edition	Oct 26, 2010	Yes	Core
"L.A. Woman"	The Doors	1971	Classic Rock	The Doors Greatest Hits: Rock Band Edition	Oct 26, 2010	No	Core
"Love Her Madly"	The Doors	1971	Classic Rock	The Doors Greatest Hits: Rock Band Edition	Oct 26, 2010	Yes	Core
"Love Me Two Times"	The Doors	1967	Classic Rock	The Doors Greatest Hits: Rock Band Edition	Oct 26, 2010	No	Core
"Peace Frog"	The Doors	1970	Classic Rock	The Doors Greatest Hits: Rock Band Edition	Oct 26, 2010	No	Core
"People Are Strange"	The Doors	1967	Classic Rock	The Doors Greatest Hits: Rock Band Edition	Oct 26, 2010	Yes	Core
"Roadhouse Blues"	The Doors	1970	Classic Rock	The Doors Greatest Hits: Rock Band Edition	Oct 26, 2010	No	Core
"Soul Kitchen"	The Doors	1967	Classic Rock	The Doors Greatest Hits: Rock Band Edition	Oct 26, 2010	No	Core
"The Crystal Ship"	The Doors	1967	Classic Rock	The Doors Greatest Hits: Rock Band Edition	Oct 26, 2010	Yes	Core
"Subdivisions"	Rush	1982	Prog	Single	Nov 2, 2010	Yes	Core & Pro Guitar/Bass
"Bad Medicine"	Bon Jovi	1988	Rock	Bon Jovi: Greatest Hits: Rock Band Edition	Nov 9, 2010	No	Core
"Blaze of Glory"	Bon Jovi	1990	Rock	Bon Jovi: Greatest Hits: Rock Band Edition	Nov 9, 2010	No	Core
"Have a Nice Day"	Bon Jovi	2005	Rock	Bon Jovi: Greatest Hits: Rock Band Edition	Nov 9, 2010	No	Core
"I'll Be There for You"	Bon Jovi	1988	Rock	Bon Jovi: Greatest Hits: Rock Band Edition	Nov 9, 2010	No	Core
"It's My Life"	Bon Jovi	2000	Rock	Bon Jovi: Greatest Hits: Rock Band Edition	Nov 9, 2010	No	Core
"Lay Your Hands On Me"	Bon Jovi	1988	Rock	Bon Jovi: Greatest Hits: Rock Band Edition	Nov 9, 2010	No	Core
"Livin' on a Prayer" (RB3 Version)	Bon Jovi	1986	Rock	Bon Jovi: Greatest Hits: Rock Band Edition	Nov 9, 2010	No	Core & Pro Guitar/Bass
"Runaway"	Bon Jovi	1984	Rock	Bon Jovi: Greatest Hits: Rock Band Edition	Nov 9, 2010	No	Core & Pro Guitar/Bass
"Wanted Dead or Alive" (RB3 Version)	Bon Jovi	1986	Rock	Bon Jovi: Greatest Hits: Rock Band Edition	Nov 9, 2010	No	Core & Pro Guitar/Bass
"We Weren't Born to Follow"	Bon Jovi	2009	Rock	Bon Jovi: Greatest Hits: Rock Band Edition	Nov 9, 2010	No	Core
"Who Says You Can't Go Home"	Bon Jovi	2005	Rock	Bon Jovi: Greatest Hits: Rock Band Edition	Nov 9, 2010	No	Core
"You Give Love a Bad Name" (RB3 Version)	Bon Jovi	1986	Rock	Bon Jovi: Greatest Hits: Rock Band Edition	Nov 9, 2010	Yes	Core & Pro Guitar/Bass
"Blue Monday" (Note: Song is also available through a special promotion.)	New Order	1983	New Wave	Single	Nov 9, 2010	No	Core & Pro Guitar/Bass
"Burning Down the House"	Talking Heads	1983	New Wave	Single	Nov 9, 2010	No	Core & Pro Guitar/Bass
"My Own Summer (Shove It)"	Deftones	1997	Nu-Metal	Single	Nov 9, 2010	No	Core & Pro Guitar/Bass
"Jive Talkin'"	Bee Gees	1975	R&B/Soul/Funk	Bee Gees 01	Nov 16, 2010	Yes	Core
"Night Fever"	Bee Gees	1977	R&B/Soul/Funk	Bee Gees 01	Nov 16, 2010	Yes	Core
"Stayin' Alive"	Bee Gees	1977	R&B/Soul/Funk	Bee Gees 01	Nov 16, 2010	Yes	Core & Pro Guitar/Bass
"Nights on Broadway"	Bee Gees	1975	R&B/Soul/Funk	Bee Gees 01	Nov 16, 2010	Yes	Core
"Tragedy"	Bee Gees	1979	R&B/Soul/Funk	Bee Gees 01	Nov 16, 2010	Yes	Core
"You Should Be Dancing"	Bee Gees	1976	R&B/Soul/Funk	Bee Gees 01	Nov 16, 2010	Yes	Core
"The Thrill is Gone"	B.B. King	1969	Blues	Single	Nov 16, 2010	Yes	Core & Pro Guitar/Bass
"A Whiter Shade of Pale"	Procol Harum	1967	Classic Rock	Single	Nov 16, 2010	Yes	Core
"Crippled Inside"	John Lennon	1971	Classic Rock	Imagine	Nov 23, 2010	No	Core
"Jealous Guy"	John Lennon	1971	Classic Rock	Imagine	Nov 23, 2010	No	Core
"It's So Hard"	John Lennon	1971	Classic Rock	Imagine	Nov 23, 2010	No	Core
"I Don't Wanna Be a Soldier Mama"	John Lennon	1971	Classic Rock	Imagine	Nov 23, 2010	No	Core
"Gimme Some Truth"	John Lennon	1971	Classic Rock	Imagine	Nov 23, 2010	No	Core
"Oh My Love"	John Lennon	1971	Classic Rock	Imagine	Nov 23, 2010	No	Core
"How Do You Sleep?"	John Lennon	1971	Classic Rock	Imagine	Nov 23, 2010	No	Core & Pro Guitar/Bass
"How?"	John Lennon	1971	Classic Rock	Imagine	Nov 23, 2010	No	Core
"Oh Yoko!"	John Lennon	1971	Classic Rock	Imagine	Nov 23, 2010	No	Core
"Hold On Loosely"	38 Special	1981	Southern Rock	Single	Nov 30, 2010	No	Core & Pro Guitar/Bass
"Can't Get Enough"	Bad Company	1974	Classic Rock	Single	Nov 30, 2010	No	Core & Pro Guitar/Bass
"Saturday Night Special"	Lynyrd Skynyrd	1975	Southern Rock	Lynyrd Skynyrd 01	Nov 30, 2010	No	Core & Pro Guitar/Bass
"Sweet Home Alabama" (Live)	Lynyrd Skynyrd	1976	Southern Rock	Lynyrd Skynyrd 01	Nov 30, 2010	No	Core & Pro Guitar/Bass
"Tuesday's Gone"	Lynyrd Skynyrd	1973	Southern Rock	Lynyrd Skynyrd 01	Nov 30, 2010	No	Core
"What's Your Name?"	Lynyrd Skynyrd	1977	Southern Rock	Lynyrd Skynyrd 01	Nov 30, 2010	No	Core & Pro Guitar/Bass
"Hammer to Fall"	Queen	1984	Classic Rock	Queen Extravaganza 01	Dec 7, 2010	No	Core & Pro Guitar/Bass
"Keep Yourself Alive"	Queen	1973	Classic Rock	Queen Extravaganza 01	Dec 7, 2010	Yes	Core & Pro Guitar/Bass
"Now I'm Here"	Queen	1974	Classic Rock	Queen Extravaganza 01	Dec 7, 2010	Yes	Core & Pro Guitar/Bass
"Play the Game"	Queen	1980	Classic Rock	Queen Extravaganza 01	Dec 7, 2010	No	Core & Pro Guitar/Bass
"Tenement Funster"	Queen	1974	Classic Rock	Queen Extravaganza 01	Dec 7, 2010	No	Core & Pro Guitar/Bass
"We Are the Champions" (RB3 Version)	Queen	1977	Classic Rock	Queen Extravaganza 01	Dec 7, 2010	Yes	Core & Pro Guitar/Bass
"We Will Rock You" (RB3 Version)	Queen	1977	Classic Rock	Queen Extravaganza 01	Dec 7, 2010	Yes	Core & Pro Guitar/Bass
"I Want It All" (RB3 Version)	Queen	1989	Classic Rock	Queen RB3 Enhanced Pack	Dec 7, 2010	Yes	Core & Pro Guitar/Bass
"I Want To Break Free" (RB3 Version)	Queen	1984	Classic Rock	Queen RB3 Enhanced Pack	Dec 7, 2010	No	Core & Pro Guitar/Bass
"Killer Queen" (RB3 Version)	Queen	1974	Classic Rock	Queen RB3 Enhanced Pack	Dec 7, 2010	No	Core & Pro Guitar/Bass
"One Vision" (RB3 Version)	Queen	1986	Classic Rock	Queen RB3 Enhanced Pack	Dec 7, 2010	No	Core & Pro Guitar/Bass
"Somebody to Love" (RB3 Version)	Queen	1976	Classic Rock	Queen RB3 Enhanced Pack	Dec 7, 2010	No	Core & Pro Guitar/Bass
"Under Pressure" (RB3 Version)	Queen	1982	Classic Rock	Queen RB3 Enhanced Pack	Dec 7, 2010	Yes	Core & Pro Guitar/Bass
"Big Shot"	Billy Joel	1978	Classic Rock	Billy Joel: The Hits: Rock Band Edition	Dec 14, 2010	No	Core & Pro Guitar/Bass
"Captain Jack"	Billy Joel	1973	Classic Rock	Billy Joel: The Hits: Rock Band Edition	Dec 14, 2010	No	Core
"It's Still Rock and Roll to Me"	Billy Joel	1980	Classic Rock	Billy Joel: The Hits: Rock Band Edition	Dec 14, 2010	Yes	Core
"Movin' Out (Anthony's Song)"	Billy Joel	1977	Classic Rock	Billy Joel: The Hits: Rock Band Edition	Dec 14, 2010	Yes	Core & Pro Guitar/Bass
"Only the Good Die Young"	Billy Joel	1977	Classic Rock	Billy Joel: The Hits: Rock Band Edition	Dec 14, 2010	No	Core & Pro Guitar/Bass
"Piano Man"	Billy Joel	1973	Classic Rock	Billy Joel: The Hits: Rock Band Edition	Dec 14, 2010	No	Core
"Pressure"	Billy Joel	1982	Classic Rock	Billy Joel: The Hits: Rock Band Edition	Dec 14, 2010	Yes	Core
"Say Goodbye to Hollywood"	Billy Joel	1976	Classic Rock	Billy Joel: The Hits: Rock Band Edition	Dec 14, 2010	Yes	Core
"The Entertainer"	Billy Joel	1974	Classic Rock	Billy Joel: The Hits: Rock Band Edition	Dec 14, 2010	No	Core
"The Stranger"	Billy Joel	1977	Classic Rock	Billy Joel: The Hits: Rock Band Edition	Dec 14, 2010	Yes	Core
"We Didn't Start the Fire"	Billy Joel	1989	Classic Rock	Billy Joel: The Hits: Rock Band Edition	Dec 14, 2010	No	Core
"You May Be Right"	Billy Joel	1980	Classic Rock	Billy Joel: The Hits: Rock Band Edition	Dec 14, 2010	Yes	Core
"Happy Xmas (War Is Over)"	John & Yoko, The Plastic Ono Band	1971	Classic Rock	Single	Dec 21, 2010	No	Core
"Peut-Être une Angine"	Anaïs	2008	Pop-Rock	Single	Dec 21, 2010	No	Core
"Dis-Moi"	BB Brunes	2007	Pop-Rock	Single	Dec 21, 2010	No	Core & Pro Guitar/Bass
"Verdamp Lang Her"	BAP	1981	Rock	Single	Dec 21, 2010	No	Core
"Nur ein Wort"	Wir sind Helden	2005	Pop-Rock	Single	Dec 21, 2010	No	Core
"Fantasma"	Linea 77	2003	Nu-Metal	Single	Dec 21, 2010	No	Core
"Proibito"	Litfiba	1990	Rock	Single	Dec 21, 2010	No	Core
"Starting to Appreciate"	Tutankamon	2010	Indie Rock	Single	Dec 21, 2010	No	Core
"Dame Aire"	Skizoo	2007	Metal	Single	Dec 21, 2010	No	Core
"Jerk It Out"	Caesars	2003	Indie Rock	Single	Dec 21, 2010	No	Core & Pro Guitar/Bass
"Maybe I'm Amazed"	Paul McCartney	1970	Classic Rock	Celebrating Band on the Run	Dec 28, 2010	Yes	Core
"Band on the Run"	Paul McCartney & Wings	1973	Classic Rock	Celebrating Band on the Run	Dec 28, 2010	Yes	Core
"Helen Wheels"	Paul McCartney & Wings	1973	Classic Rock	Celebrating Band on the Run	Dec 28, 2010	No	Core
"Let Me Roll It"	Paul McCartney & Wings	1973	Classic Rock	Celebrating Band on the Run	Dec 28, 2010	No	Core & Pro Guitar/Bass
"Open My Eyes"	Inhabited	2005	Pop-Rock	Single	Dec 28, 2010	Yes	Core
"Cities in Dust"	Siouxsie and The Banshees	1986	Pop-Rock	Single	Dec 28, 2010	Yes	Core & Pro Guitar/Bass
