= Castles Made of Sand (song) =

Song by The Jimi Hendrix Experience

Song by the Jimi Hendrix Experience

from the album Axis: Bold as Love
- Released: December 1, 1967 (UK); January 15, 1968 (US)
- Recorded: October 29, 1967
- Studio: Olympic, London
- Genre: Psychedelic; soul
- Length: 2:49
- Label: Track (UK); Reprise (UK)
- Songwriter: Jimi Hendrix
- Producer: Chas Chandler

"Castles Made of Sand" is a song written by Jimi Hendrix and recorded by the Jimi Hendrix Experience for their 1967 second album, Axis: Bold as Love. Produced by manager Chas Chandler, the song is a biographical story about Hendrix's childhood, and was recorded towards the end of the production cycle for Axis: Bold as Love.

== Recording and production ==
The Jimi Hendrix Experience began and finished work on the recording for "Castles Made of Sand" at London's Olympic Sound Studios on October 29, 1967, the penultimate day of recording for Axis: Bold as Love on which the songs "Up from the Skies", "Bold as Love", "One Rainy Wish" and "EXP" were also completed. As with the rest of the album, "Castles Made of Sand" was produced by Chas Chandler and engineered by Eddie Kramer, and was mixed at Olympic on October 31.

== Composition and lyrics ==
Writing the Hendrix biography Jimi Hendrix: Electric Gypsy, commentators Harry Shapiro and Caesar Glebbeek summarise "Castles Made of Sand" as "a sharply observed reflection on life's bitter ironies". Addressing the lyrics of the song, Shapiro and Glebbeek go on to discuss the significance of sand within the track as a metaphor "for the temporary nature of existence, of time slipping away, how nothing can be taken for granted – love, loyalty, family bonds, [and] friendship".

The first verse describes a loud argument between an intoxicated man and his wife or girlfriend, while their “neighbors start to gossip and drool” as the man pleads for reconciliation. The second verse tells of a “little Indian brave” who dreams of being a warrior, but some time later is killed in his sleep by a surprise attack. The third and final verse describes a young woman who is limited to a wheelchair because she is “crippled for life and she couldn’t speak a sound” and plans on ending her life by drowning at the ocean, but miraculously is cured by the sight of a “golden winged ship” on the waters. The chorus features variations on the phrase “And so castles made of sand fall in the sea, eventually.”

It is claimed that "Castles Made of Sand" is one of Hendrix's more obviously biographical songs, said to be written about his uncertain and transitional childhood involving "different homes, different schools, different careers and a mother who was here one minute and gone the next". Hendrix's brother, Leon Hendrix, has commented that the lyrics allude to their father's alcoholism, Leon being taken away so suddenly by Child Protective Services without announcement, and the abusive relationship between their parents (or from stories told by their grandmother). Writer Tom Maginnis for AllMusic outlines the lyrical delivery of the song:

Each verse contains separate descriptions of universal disappointments ... All is not lost, however, as in the last verse a suicidal girl who is "crippled for life," moving her wheelchair to the shore, is saved by a sort of optimistic epiphany – ... The band drops out as Hendrix speaks [the] final lines, his voice and slithering guitar circling and echoing up and away into the heavens.

Musically, "The track begins with overdubbed backwards guitar creeping in, as Hendrix lays down his signature clean guitar sound", drawing comparison with fellow Axis: Bold as Love track "Little Wing". According to Maginnis, "The backwards-recorded guitar ... [creates] a dreamy atmosphere and [lends] the song its distinctive character", with fellow band members Mitch Mitchell and Noel Redding providing a "laid-back groove" with their "mid-tempo drum shuffle" and "concise bass line", respectively. Similarly, Chris Jones of the BBC also notes the "signature backwards guitar" in the song.

== Reception ==
Writing a five-star review of the album for Allmusic, Cub Koda has cited "Castles Made of Sand", along with "Little Wing", "One Rainy Wish" and "Bold as Love", as evidence of Jimi Hendrix's "remarkable growth and depth as a tunesmith, harnessing Curtis Mayfield soul guitar to Dylanesque lyrical imagery and Fuzz Face hyperactivity to produce yet another side to his grand psychedelic musical vision", describing it as a "beautiful, wistful ballad". Speaking about the track specifically, fellow Allmusic commentator Tom Maginnis cites "Castles Made of Sand" as evidence that, in writing material for The Experience's second album, "Hendrix [was] becoming a songwriter of depth, while unafraid to make use of the latest studio technology available to him". Far Out and American Songwriter both named "Castles Made of Sand" as Hendrix's seventh-greatest song.

== Legacy ==
A live recording by funk rock band Red Hot Chili Peppers is included as the B-side to 1989 single "Taste the Pain" and later on 1994 compilation Out in L.A.. Tom Maginnis of AllMusic calls it a "largely faithful tribute where guitarist John Frusciante displays a considerable Hendrix influence". The band also recorded another version, which is included as a bonus track on Blood Sugar Sex Magik.

== Personnel ==
The Jimi Hendrix Experience

- Jimi Hendrix – guitars, vocals
- Noel Redding – bass guitar
- Mitch Mitchell – drums

Additional personnel

- Chas Chandler – production
- Eddie Kramer – engineering
