= Like a Fool =

Like a Fool may refer to:

- "Like a Fool" (Dottie West song), 1967
- "Like a Fool" (Viola Beach song), 2016
- "Like a Fool", a song by Charlotte Church from Three, 2013
- "Like a Fool", a song by Nylon Beat, 1998
- "Like a Fool", a song by Robin Gibb from Walls Have Eyes, 1985
- "Like a Fool", a song by Shaimus, 2009
- "Like a Fool", a song by Twice from The Story Begins, 2015
