= Dead & Bloated =

Promotional single by Stone Temple Pilots

from the album Core
- Released: 1992
- Recorded: May 1992
- Studio: Rumbo Recorders (Los Angeles)
- Genre: Grunge; alternative metal; sludge metal
- Length: 5:10
- Label: Atlantic
- Composers: Robert DeLeo, Scott Weiland
- Lyricist: Scott Weiland
- Producer: Brendan O'Brien

Stone Temple Pilots promotional singles chronology
"Dead & Bloated" (1992)	"Crackerman" (1992)

Audio sample
- file; help

"Dead & Bloated" is a song by American rock band Stone Temple Pilots that appears as the opening track on their debut studio album, Core (1992). Frontman Scott Weiland was the primary songwriter, with bassist Robert DeLeo co-writing the music, and Brendan O'Brien producing. The song is one of the band's heaviest, and is well-known for the opening line "I am smellin' like a rose", that Weiland sings into the pickup of Dean DeLeo's guitar.

A promotional single was released by Atlantic Records in 1992. In 2015, the song peaked at No. 13 on the Hard Rock Digital Song Sales chart and No. 49 on the Rock Digital Singles chart. The song remains a fan favorite and continues to see frequent play during concerts, despite never receiving a commercial single.

== Background ==
Bassist Robert DeLeo said on the song's origins:

I was working at a guitar shop [LAB Sound] on the corner of Sunset and Gardner, and Scott was actually working catty-cornered across the street, driving models to their photo shoots. When either one of us had a musical idea, we'd call each other. He would usually have more time to run over and work it out. It was perfect because, since I was in a guitar shop, I could pick up a guitar right there. Scott didn't really play an instrument. When he had an idea, he would hum it to me. And 'Dead and Bloated,' was one of those things; he hummed that verse riff to me.

Drummer Eric Kretz recalls him and Weiland were at a Mexican restaurant in Beverly Hills, California, when he stated "hey, man. I came up with this idea," and started singing, "I am smelli'’ like a rose …" Veins popped out of his neck in excitement. "So we just started pounding the table to the rhythm of what he had going on, and, man, we were working on something good here," Kretz remembers.

When the band recorded the song at Rumbo Recorders in Los Angeles, Weiland stood right in front of Kretz's drum kit, and stared at him with a handheld mic the whole time he’s singing. Kretz reflected "it was like football players bashing their helmets right before a game, trying to get each other psyched up. And I just beat the crap out of the drums on that track."

== Composition ==
Stone Temple Pilots never saw themselves as a metal band, but found inspiration in the music of Metallica. In the early 1990s, the band was grouped in with the genre, due to touring with Alice in Chains, Megadeth and Pantera. "Dead & Bloated" has been described as "alt-metal à la Alice in Chains," but also as grunge, sludge metal and "doom-blues". The opening has Weiland sing into the pickup of Dean DeLeo's guitar, before the full band kicks in. He planned to use a megaphone, but the band recommend he "sing it into the guitar pickup and see what happens."

According the sheet music published at Musicnotes.com by Universal Music Publishing Group, the song is five minutes and ten seconds, and is written in the key of D major with a slow, half-time tempo of 62 beats per minute. Weiland's vocal range spans two octaves, from G_{4} to A_{5}, while Dean DeLeo's guitar spans from E3 to G_{5}.

== Lyrics ==
Weiland, when interviewed by Songfacts, stated that "Dead & Bloated" is not "really about anything. It's just stream-of-consciousness words. I mean, at the age of 21, 22, I didn't have a whole lot of life experiences. So it's more about the vibe, the angst and that kind of a thing, as opposed to actual life experiences."

Dean DeLeo revealed he has to be careful with what he says about Weiland's lyrics, because they are often personal to him. He adds "I can tell you one thing, though: Scott was 23 years old writing those lyrics, man. When we were writing this record, and I say this with humility, we knew what we had was good because we were getting one another off." A lot of the lyrical content on Core, including "Dead & Bloated", was about the "big question mark that stood in front of" the band, such as where they will be and what will happen to their family in the future.

== Track listing ==
Side A
No.	Title	Writer(s)	Length
1.	"Dead & Bloated"	Robert DeLeo, Weiland	5:10
2.	"Sex Type Thing"	Dean DeLeo, Eric Kretz, Weiland	3:37

Side B
No.	Title	Writer(s)	Length
1.	"Piece of Pie"	R. DeLeo	5:24
2.	"Creep"	R. DeLeo	5:34
Total length:			19:45

== Personnel ==
Credits adapted from Core linear notes.

Stone Temple Pilots

- Scott Weiland (credited as Weiland) – lead vocals
- Robert DeLeo – bass, backing vocals
- Dean DeLeo – guitars
- Eric Kretz – drums

Additional personnel

- Brendan O'Brien – production and mixing
- Steve Stewart – management
- Nick DiDia – engineer
- Dick Kaneshiro – 2nd engineer
- Tom Baker – mastering

== Charts ==
Chart (2015)	Peak position
US Rock Digital Songs (Billboard)	49
US Hard Rock Digital Song Sales (Billboard)	13
