= Wait Until Tomorrow =

Song by the Jimi Hendrix Experience

from the album Axis: Bold as Love
- Released: December 1, 1967
- Recorded: October 26, 1967
- Studio: Olympic Sound, London
- Genre: Rhythm and blues
- Length: 3:00
- Label: Track
- Songwriter: Jimi Hendrix
- Producer: Chas Chandler

"Wait Until Tomorrow" is a song by the Jimi Hendrix Experience from their 1967 second album Axis: Bold as Love. Written by Jimi Hendrix, the song details the scenario of a male protagonist addressing his female love with whom he plans to leave home, only to be shot dead by her father. Despite not being released as a single, "Wait Until Tomorrow" has been recognized as one of the strongest songs on the album.

== Background and style ==
"Wait Until Tomorrow" was one of the first "situation song[s]" written by Hendrix and is said to be influenced by soul artists such as the Isley Brothers (with whom Hendrix performed before forming the Experience) and stylistically similar to guitarist Steve Cropper. A "head-on boy–girl song", "Wait Until Tomorrow" was one of the final songs recorded for the album on October 26, 1967, before the album was completed with the recording of title track "Bold as Love" three days later. In an AllMusic review, Matthew Greenwald described the progression and style of the song.

A great bass and guitar duet is the core riff, and, as usual, Hendrix builds up to gentle and entertaining crescendos from there. Lyrically, the song finds Hendrix writing a situation song, creating characters in the first person. This was one of his first attempts at this, and it's fun listening to him stretch his songwriting abilities.

== Reception ==
Reviews of Axis: Bold as Love have generally mentioned "Wait Until Tomorrow" in a positive light. Matthew Greenwald of allmusic identifies the "playful song" as "one of the low-key highlights" of the album, while Parke Puterbaugh of Rolling Stone describes it as a "taut, funky, could've-been-hit." In reviewing the album for the BBC, Chris Jones summarised "Wait Until Tomorrow" as "a wry, funky little tale", while Sputnikmusic reviewer "Broken Arrow" comments:

The intro is light and quick, [with a] guitar part and a real heavy bass [line] that only consists of one note but really adds to the intro. As Jimi [Hendrix]'s vocals and Mitch [Mitchell]'s drums come in the band goes into more of a groove. After a nice guitar fill that resembles the intro the extremely catchy chorus comes with some nice background vocals. The intro theme gets repeated a few times in the song before every verse. Mitch plays some very nice fills in this song and keeps a solid beat throughout [it]. 4/5

== Covers ==
- It was covered by the John Mayer Trio on their debut album Try!. They would cover it again for the Mayer's live album Where the Light Is.
- The New York Rock & Roll Ensemble covered it on their 1969 album "Faithful Friends", and released it as a single in the same year.
- Brazilian singers Caetano Veloso and Gilberto Gil covered the song on the 1993 album Tropicália 2.
