= Bold as Love (song) =

Song by the Jimi Hendrix Experience

from the album Axis: Bold as Love
- Released: December 1, 1967
- Recorded: October 29, 1967
- Studio: Olympic Sound, London
- Genre: Psychedelic rock; psychedelic soul
- Length: 4:15
- Label: Track
- Songwriter: Jimi Hendrix
- Producer: Chas Chandler

"Bold as Love" is the title track of Axis: Bold as Love, the second album by the Jimi Hendrix Experience. The song, which closes the album, was written by Jimi Hendrix and produced by band manager Chas Chandler.

== Recording and production ==
The Jimi Hendrix Experience began work on "Bold as Love" in October 1967 at London's Olympic Sound Studios, recording a number of instrumental backing tracks in an initial session dedicated to the song on October 4. Hendrix, Noel Redding and Mitch Mitchell also spent the following day's session focused on the track, recording over 20 different takes and four different endings throughout the day before eventually settling on a combination of takes 21 and 27 for the master recording. After diverting attention to other songs set for the album, the band returned to finish work on "Bold as Love" on October 29, completing "Up from the Skies", "Castles Made of Sand", "One Rainy Wish" and "EXP" in the same session. As with the rest of the album, "Bold as Love" was produced by Chas Chandler and engineered by Eddie Kramer.

== Composition and lyrics ==
Hendrix biographer Harry Shapiro describes the theme of "Bold as Love" as being "an Olympian battle of passions whose strategy is mapped out ... self-evidently in colours", noting in relation to the lyrics that "The conclusion has to be that love comes in many hues, love is hard work and to get properly involved takes commitment and courage". AllMusic writer Denise Sullivan explains in a similar way that the song "outlines a rainbow in an epic declaration of love in its many colours", proposing that "One interpretation may be that people are one, despite our different shades; another may be that in all persons there resides an array of emotions, each corresponding to a color" and concluding that "In either case, complete integration is Hendrix's ideal". The practice of using colours as lyrical metaphors has been compared to fellow Axis: Bold as Love track "One Rainy Wish" and Are You Experienced number "Love or Confusion".

BBC review writer Chris Jones has noted that "Bold as Love" uses "the first flowerings of phasing to make Jimi's Strat sound more like a whole orchestra on its trick ending". Shapiro and Glebbeek described the song's use of flanging on the outro:

The rather abrupt editing of the coda takes us into Mitch [Mitchell]'s solo/fill, 'flanged' by Eddie Kramer, an effect achieved by manipulating one of two tape decks running simultaneously and mixing the signal. Jimi arpeggios and phase-solos his way through the coda, taking the spaceship in stately and regal fashion out of orbit and into the stratosphere.

== Reception ==
Shapiro and Glebbeek claim that "From all viewpoints, "Bold as Love" is the album's tour de force". Writing a five-star review of the album for AllMusic, Cub Koda has cited the title track, along with "Little Wing", "Castles Made of Sand" and "One Rainy Wish", as evidence of Jimi Hendrix's "remarkable growth and depth as a tunesmith, harnessing Curtis Mayfield soul guitar to Dylanesque lyrical imagery and Fuzz Face hyperactivity to produce yet another side to his grand psychedelic musical vision". Sullivan singles out "Bold as Love" as the highlight of the album.

== Covers, re-issues, and tribute versions ==
"Bold as Love" has been interpreted by a number of artists since its original release in 1967. American blues rock artist John Mayer recorded a studio version for his 2006 third album Continuum. Mayer's cover has yielded mixed critical reviews – Mike Joseph of PopMatters dubbed his rendition a "solid cover", and Anthony DeCurtis of Rolling Stone called it a "capable cover"; on the other hand, Slant Magazine writer Jonathan Keefe criticised Mayer's vocal performance on the track, and Ann Powers of the Los Angeles Times called the cover an "overeager version" of the original. A live version was also released on the 2008 video album Where the Light Is: John Mayer Live in Los Angeles, which Matt Collar of AllMusic labelled an "inspired take" on Hendrix's song.

Additional versions have been recorded and released by alternative rock band The Pretenders, for 1993's Stone Free: A Tribute to Jimi Hendrix, jam rock group Phish, for the 1999 live album Hampton Comes Alive, blues-rock singer Joan Osborne on her 2002 album of 1960s soul music covers How Sweet It Is, and blues guitarist Robben Ford, for the 2005 tribute album Gypsy Blood: A Tribute to Jimi Hendrix Vol. 2.

The original track has also been featured on the 1997 compilation Experience Hendrix: The Best of Jimi Hendrix, and an alternate studio recording is included on the 2000 box set The Jimi Hendrix Experience.

== Personnel ==
The Jimi Hendrix Experience

- Jimi Hendrix – guitars, lead vocals, harpsichord
- Noel Redding – bass
- Mitch Mitchell – drums

Recording

- Chas Chandler – production
- Eddie Kramer – engineering
