= Plush (song) =

1993 single by Stone Temple Pilots

- UK and European picture sleeve

Single by Stone Temple Pilots

from the album Core
- B-side: "Sin"
- Released: February 15, 1993
- Recorded: May 1992
- Genre: Grunge; alternative rock; hard rock
- Length: 5:13 (album version); 4:19 (radio edit)
- Label: Atlantic
- Composer: Robert DeLeo
- Lyricists: Scott Weiland; Eric Kretz
- Producer: Brendan O'Brien

Stone Temple Pilots singles chronology
"Sex Type Thing" (1992)	"Plush" (1993)	"Creep" (1993)

Audio sample
- file; help

Music video
- "Plush" on YouTube

"Plush" is a song by the American rock band Stone Temple Pilots from their debut studio album, Core (1992). The song was serviced to US radio on February 15, 1993, through Atlantic Records.

According to Robert DeLeo, who composed the song, it "changed everything" for the band. Scott Weiland and Eric Kretz co-wrote the lyrics. It became the first alternative song to top the US Billboard Album Rock Tracks, that listing's No. 1 song of 1993, and charted in Canada, Europe and Oceania. Two music videos were directed by Josh Taft. The first was released in 1993 to heavy rotation on MTV, earning the band a MTV Video Music Award for Best New Artist award. The second is found on the Thank You bonus DVD.

On release, "Plush" saw mixed-to-negative reviews from critics, with many finding the song derivative of other grunge and alternative bands, particularly Pearl Jam. While winning in the category of "Best Hard Rock Performance" at the 1994 Grammy Awards, it took until the 21st century for most reviews to come around to the song. "Plush" is now regarded as one of the best and most influential songs of the 1990s, and along with its band, is an icon of the decade's pop culture.

== Composition and lyrics ==
"Plush" is a slow and steady grunge, alternative rock and hard rock song, combining a country riff and ragtime chords from Robert DeLeo's guitar exercises, with "metal stylings." According to the sheet music published at Musicnotes.com by Universal Music Publishing Group, the song is written in the key of G major, and is set in time signature of common time with a tempo of 116 beats per minute. Weiland's vocal range spans two octaves, from E_{4} to G_{5}.

Written in a hot tub at the Oakwood Apartments, "Plush" is loosely based on a newspaper article lead singer Scott Weiland had read. In the early 90s, a girl had been found dead after being kidnapped in Melbourne, Australia. Weiland added, during an episode of VH1 Storytellers, that:

"A girl was kidnapped and then later found tragically murdered back in the early part of the Nineties. So it gave me fuel to write the words to this song. However, this song is not about that, really; it's sort of a metaphor for a lost, obsessive relationship."

A third meaning of the song, Weiland and drummer Eric Kretz thinking about the future of themselves and their significant others, was mentioned by Dean DeLeo during a 2017 interview with MusicRadar for the 25th anniversary of Core. The name "Plush", considered for an album title by the band, was chosen by Weiland, who was trying to get textures in with words and his thoughts, according to Kretz, also interviewed for the album's 25th anniversary.

== Release ==
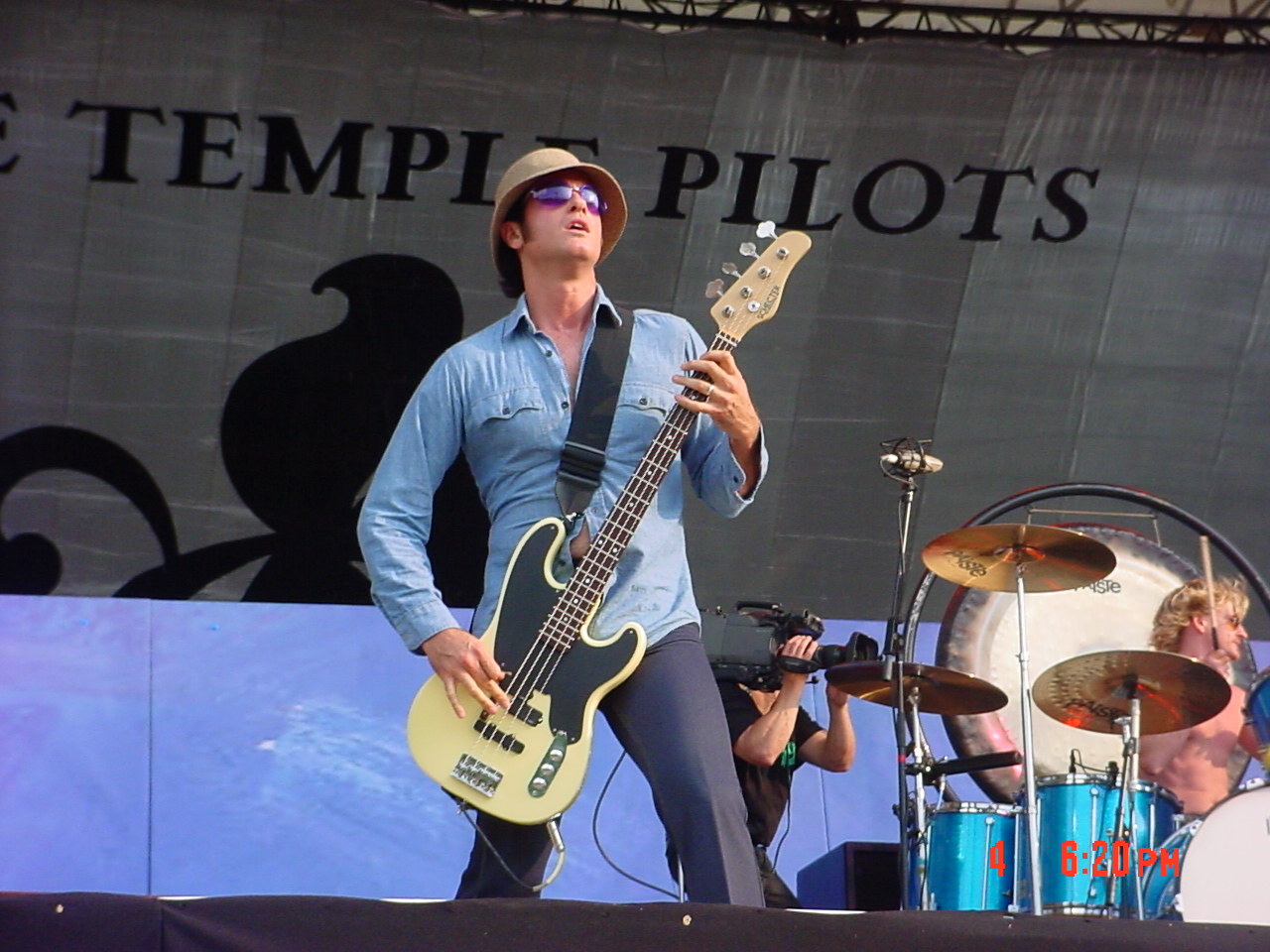
Bassist Robert DeLeo suggested "Plush" be the album's second single

Stone Temple Pilots knew that "Plush" was probably going to get attention, as did Atlantic Records, who suggested the song be the album's lead single. While the band respected the label for giving them full creative control, they also understood their main goal was to turn a profit. As a result, the band instead released the song as Core's second single, not wanting to be a one-hit wonder. For the same reason, the song was buried at track nine on the album, with Robert DeLeo adding: "We did that intentionally. We didn't want to be that band that had a huge hit and then it was like, 'What next?' We wanted to have a career. We didn't want to be the kind of band that came out with a big song and then went away."

Atlantic Records serviced "Plush" to US radio on February 15, 1993. In the United Kingdom, the song was released as a single commercially on August 23, 1993, across four formats: 7-inch vinyl, 12-inch vinyl, CD, and cassette. In Japan, a mini-CD single was issued on October 25, 1993.

== Critical reception ==
=== Contemporary reviews ===
"Plush" received mixed-to-negative reviews on release, with critics noting a lack of originality. Daina Darzin of Rolling Stone called the song "embarrassingly Pearl Jam-like," but added the band's "focus is indeed different. STP's strong point is a muscular SoCal energy – primordially fierce, like those-tigers-kill-antelope nature films they're always hawking on the Discovery channel."

AllMusic's Stephen Thomas Erlewine had mixed thoughts on most tracks from Core, but defended "Plush" as a "majestic album rock revival more melodic and stylish than anything grunge produced outside of Nirvana itself."

=== Retrospective reviews ===
Retrospective reviews have been generally positive. The song was ranked at number 19 on Paste's list of "The 50 Best Grunge Songs", and declared "one of the movement's most significant contributions," by Michael Danaher. Top 40 Weekly placed the song at number 42 on their "50 Best Hard Rock Songs of All Time" list, applauding Scott Weiland's "intense, emotive vocals" and Dean DeLeo's "gritty guitar work." The song was ranked at number five on The Daily Vault's list of "Elegant Bachelors: A Stone Temple Pilots Song Countdown", and labeled a "majestic, confident rocker" by Benjamin Ray, also praising Kretz's "spacious drums." Loudwire placed the song at number 2 on their "10 Best Stone Temple Pilots Songs" list, and credited "Plush" as "the song that truly put STP on the map."

AllMusic's Chris True described the song as big, lumbering and "wrapped up in metal stylings." He agreed with comparisons to Eddie Vedder, but insisted that Stone Temple Pilots weren't the only band copying him. Billboard's William Goodman declared the song is "powerful" with "layers of power chord slashes and twinkling riffs surround Weiland's crooning." Ultimate Classic Rock's Bryan Rolli brought up the song, alongside "Wicked Garden" and "Crackerman", as packing "supersized hooks and smoldering guitar riffs". He concluded that "Plush is a "megalithic pop-rock stomper."

== Commercial performance ==
In the United States, "Plush" first appeared at No. 34 on the Billboard Album Rock Tracks chart on March 20, 1993. Fourteen weeks later, on June 26, the song became Stone Temple Pilot's first No. 1 single on the chart. It stayed at that position for that week only and spent a total of 31 weeks on the chart, making it Stone Temple Pilots' second-longest-charting single, after "Interstate Love Song" (1994). On the Billboard Modern Rock Tracks chart, "Plush" debuted at No. 28 on April 10, 1993, and reached its peak of No. 9 on June 26 as well. It stayed on this ranking for 18 weeks. The song crossed over to pop radio, peaking at No. 18 on the Billboard Top 40/Mainstream chart in September 1993 and charting for 14 weeks. Since "Plush" was not released as a commercial single in the United States, it was ineligible to chart on the Billboard Hot 100 due to rules in place at the time; it instead appeared on the Billboard Hot 100 Airplay chart, peaking at No. 39 on August 14, 1993, and lasting for 29 weeks. On the Cash Box Top 100, the song peaked at No. 81. At the end of 1993, Billboard ranked "Plush" as the most successful album rock song of the year, as well as the 18th-most successful modern rock track.

On Canada's RPM 100 Hit Tracks chart, "Plush" debuted at No. 73 on August 7, 1993, and peaked at No. 21 five weeks later, on September 11. In Europe, "Plush" became a top-five hit in Iceland, peaking at No. 5 on September 30, 1993, after five weeks on the Íslenski Listinn Topp 40, and it finished the year at No. 21 on Iceland's year-end ranking. In the United Kingdom, the song debuted at No. 24 on the UK Singles Chart and rose to its peak of No. 23 the following week. It stayed within the top 100 for four weeks and is the band's highest- and longest-charting UK single. The song was certified silver by the British Phonographic Industry (BPI) in April 2025 for sales and streaming figures exceeding 200,000 units. In neighboring Ireland, it entered the top 20, peaking at No. 16 and charting inside the top 30 for four weeks. In mainland Europe, the single peaked at No. 37 in Belgium, No. 15 in the Netherlands, and No. 18 in Sweden, making it the band's only charting single in all three countries. In Sweden, it was the 71st-best-selling single of 1993. On the Eurochart Hot 100, the song reached No. 44 in September 1993, based on its British, Dutch, Irish, and Swedish sales.

"Plush" also charted in Oceania. In Australia, it debuted on the ARIA Singles Chart on August 8, 1993. The song did not enter the top 50 until late October, when it reached its peak of No. 47. The song dropped out of the top 50 the following week but returned on November 7, at No. 48. The song charted higher on New Zealand's RIANZ Singles Chart, first appearing at No. 49 on the same day as its Australian debut. Although the song left the top 50 on August 15, it jumped to its peak of No. 23 on August 22, giving Stone Temple Pilots their highest-charting New Zealand single. It is also their longest-charting single, spending 10 weeks in the top 50 altogether. In December 2024, Recorded Music NZ (RMNZ) awarded the song a double-platinum certification, denoting sales and streaming figures of over 60,000 units.

== Music video ==
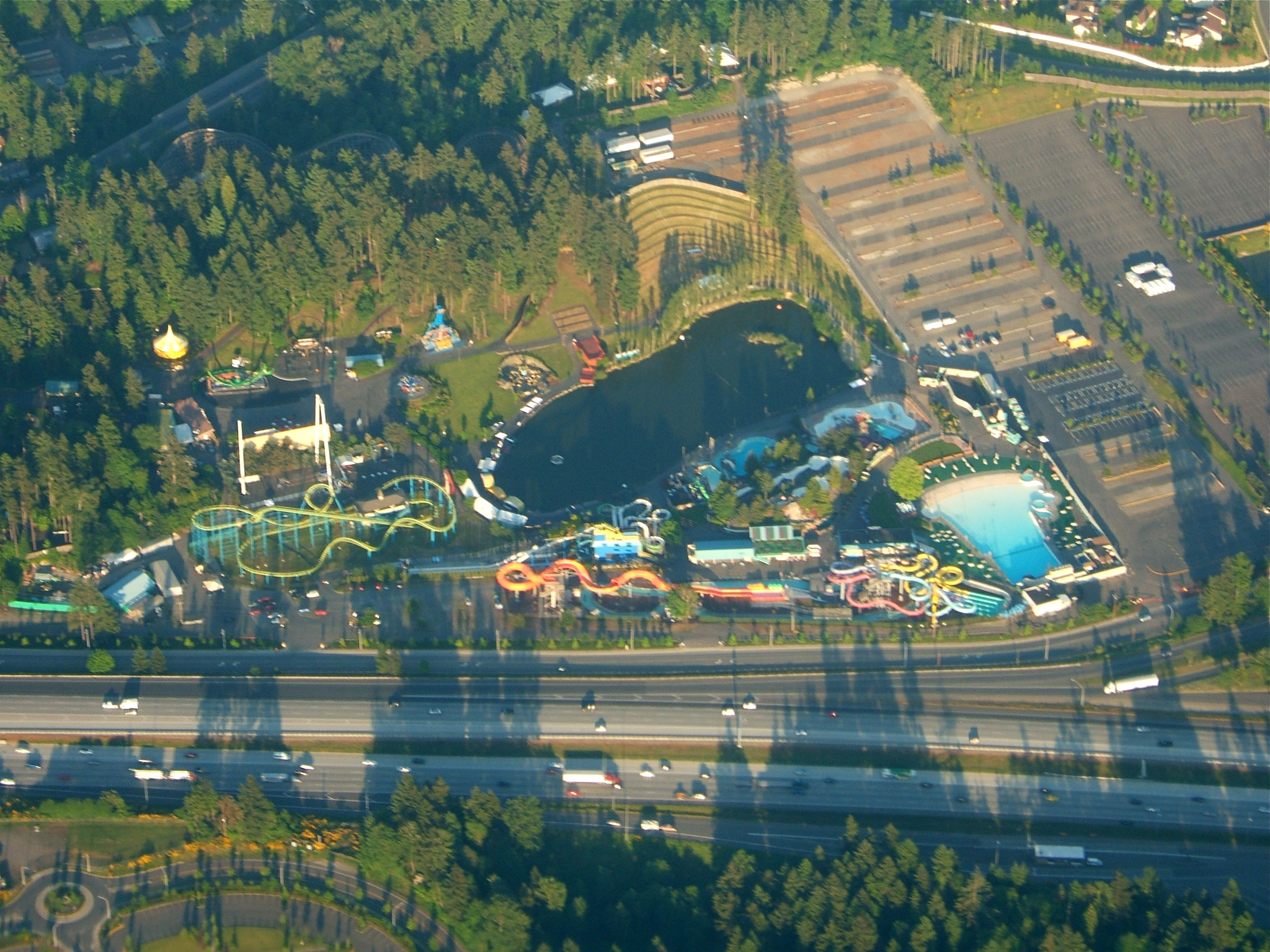
The video for "Plush" was partially recorded at Wild Waves Theme Park in Federal Way, Washington

The music video was directed by Josh Taft, who explained the story behind the clip in the 2016 book Scott Weiland: Memories of a Rock Star. He previously directed the "Sex Type Thing" video and disclosed that "the second videos are always a more dynamic story – especially when the first ones are hits," with the record label and management having more input. This made recording "somewhat of a painful process." He tried to represent the ideas of "Plush" in a metaphoric way, combining a visual interpretation of the song's lyrics with footage of Weiland singing with the band as a lounge act in an empty bar.

The video was recorded at Red Hen, a little country-western bar in the Green Lake area of Seattle and "weird little" amusement park in Federal Way, south of the Seattle–Tacoma International Airport. "We tried to make it as haunted and sort of spooky as we could - without pushing the boundaries of what was air-able at that time," he recalled. As for Weiland's neon-red hair, he caught on to how management was trying to portray him in the video, so embraced the fact, telling Taft "I can see they're starting to turn me into a clown. So why don't I just be the clown that they're trying to turn me into in the video?" which he responded with "that sounds good to me!"

The video was released in 1993 to heavy rotation on MTV, playing a major role in the band's commercial breakthrough. IThe same year, it was nominated for "Best Alternative Video" at that year's MTV Video Music Awards, but would lose out to Nirvana's "In Bloom" (however, Stone Temple Pilots won an award for "Best New Artist" that evening). There are two different versions of this video, with minor differences. On the Thank You bonus DVD, the last shot of the video features a woman looking at a mirror image of herself viewing her whole body while the mirror image drifts away. In another version, she is looking at a mirror image of her face, with water (possibly rain) dripping down the reflection of the mirror.

== Legacy ==
Stone Temple Pilots had a steady rise to mainstream success. Early on, the band played in rooms that held 80 to 120 people, and bars with as few as 10 people, but after recording Core, they played to a crowd of about 800 people at a club in San Diego called Club 860. This was the moment Robert DeLeo sensed the band was getting big. Their debut single, "Sex Type Thing", was released on March 15, 1993, to heavy rotation on MTV and across radio, but "Plush" was their commercial breakthrough, and according to DeLeo, "changed everything" for the band. Reportedly, arenas they played at went from a third full to full. "People were there to see the band, people wanted to hear 'Plush.' They wanted to see that guy with red hair singing that song." he added. Eric Kretz similarly joked he "never heard of that one."

In 1994, "Plush" won in the category of "Best Hard Rock Performance" at the 1994 Grammy Awards. The music video earned the band a MTV Video Music Award for Best New Artist award in 1993. The song was also voted number 12 on the Australian annual music poll Triple J Hottest 100 in 1993. According to Nielsen Music's year-end report for 2019, "Plush" was the fourth most-played song of the decade on mainstream rock radio, with 133,000 spins. The song is the band's second most popular on Spotify, with over 450 million streams, only losing to "Interstate Love Song".

== Track listings ==
- UK 7-inch and cassette single
1. "Plush" (edit) – 4:19
2. "Sin" – 6:05
- UK 12-inch single

A1. "Plush" – 5:14
A2. "Sin" – 6:05
B1. "Sex Type Thing" (Swing Type version) – 4:20
B2. "Plush" (Acoustic Type version) – 4:47

- UK and Australian CD single
1. "Plush" (edit) – 4:19
2. "Sin" – 6:05
3. "Sex Type Thing" (Swing Type version) – 4:20
4. "Sex Type Thing" (live on The Word) – 3:32
- Japanese mini-CD single
1. "Plush" (acoustic from MTV Headbanger's Ball: Take 1)
2. "Wicked Garden"

== Personnel ==
Personnel are adapted from the Core liner notes.

Stone Temple Pilots

- Scott Weiland (credited as Weiland) – lead vocals
- Robert DeLeo – bass, backing vocals
- Dean DeLeo – guitars
- Eric Kretz – drums

Additional personnel

- Brendan O'Brien – production and mixing
- Steve Stewart – management
- Nick DiDia – engineer
- Dick Kaneshiro – 2nd engineer
- Tom Baker – mastering

== Charts ==
=== Weekly charts ===
1993 weekly chart performance for "Plush"
Chart (1993)	Peak position
Australia (ARIA)	47
Belgium (Ultratop 50 Flanders)	37
Canada Top Singles (RPM)	21
Europe (Eurochart Hot 100)	44
Iceland (Íslenski Listinn Topp 40)	5
Ireland (IRMA)	16
Netherlands (Dutch Top 40)	20
Netherlands (Single Top 100)	15
New Zealand (Recorded Music NZ)	23
Sweden (Sverigetopplistan)	18
UK Singles (Official Charts)	23
UK Rock & Metal Singles (ERA)	2
US Radio Songs (Billboard)	39
US Alternative Airplay (Billboard)	9
US Mainstream Rock Airplay (Billboard)	1
US Pop Airplay (Billboard)	18
US Cash Box Top 100	81

2015 weekly chart performance for "Plush"
Chart (2015)	Peak position
US Hot Rock & Alternative Songs (Billboard)	7

=== Year-end charts ===
Year-end chart performance for "Plush"
Chart (1993)	Position
Iceland (Íslenski Listinn Topp 40)	29
Sweden (Topplistan)	71
US Album Rock Tracks (Billboard)	1
US Modern Rock Tracks (Billboard)	18

=== Decade-end charts ===
Decade-end chart performance for "Plush"
Chart (2010–2019)	Position
US Mainstream Rock (Billboard)	4

== Certifications ==
Certifications for "Plush"
Region	Certification	Certified units/sales
New Zealand (RMNZ)	2× Platinum	60,000^{‡}
United Kingdom (BPI)	Silver	200,000^{‡}
^{‡} Sales+streaming figures based on certification alone.

== Release history ==
Release dates and formats for "Plush"
Region	Date	Format(s)	Label(s)	Ref.
United States	February 15, 1993	Rock radio	Atlantic	
United Kingdom	August 23, 1993	7-inch vinyl; 12-inch vinyl; CD; cassette	Atlantic	
Japan	October 25, 1993	Mini-CD	Atlantic	

== Acoustic version ==
"Plush" (acoustic)

Promotional single by Stone Temple Pilots

from the album Thank You
- Released: 2003
- Studio: MTV Headbangers Ball
- Length: 3:50
- Label: Atlantic
- Songwriters: Scott Weiland; Dean DeLeo

Stone Temple Pilots promotional single chronology
"Wonderful" (2002)	"Plush" (acoustic) (2003)	"Cinnamon" (2010)

Music video
- "Plush" (acoustic) on YouTube

Weiland and Dean DeLeo performed an impromptu acoustic version of "Plush" on the MTV show Headbangers Ball on December 5, 1992. The recording was originally only available on a CD single from the United Kingdom for their single, "Creep", the European CD single for "Sex Type Thing," and on the German promotional single "Plush (unplushed)". It was not officially released anywhere else until appearing on the greatest hits album, Thank You (2003) alongside the original studio recording.

Upon its release as a promotional single in 2003, the acoustic rendition did not chart on the US or international charts, but had moderate airplay when the original version had heavy airplay on radio at the time.

A rare first take of the same acoustic version on MTV's Headbangers Ball was also available, but it was only found as a B-side to the rare "Crackerman" single. It has the same length and processing as the original electric version, and also uses the last part of the original electric version.

=== Critical reception ===
The Daily Vault's Benjamin Ray, while praising both the electric and acoustic versions of "Plush" as hits, prefers the former, as he feels Eric Kretz's drumming gives it more "power." Ghost Cult Magazine's Nik Cameron recalled his "heart nearly seized" when seeing the song performed on MTV's Headbangers Ball. The Great Album's Bill Lambusta and Brian Erickson praised the song and Weiland's vocal performance, "there's nothing. He's just sitting in front of a microphone. Crystal clear. And just nearly perfect, I would say."

Dolby Disaster's Mike Beal placed the song (specifically the first take on MTV's Headbangers Ball) at number 24 on his "Dolby's Top 25 Unplugged Songs of All Time" list, and wrote it "offers a nice tinge of bongos and dual guitar as an easy backdrop for that brilliant chord progression."
