= Core (album) =

Studio album by Stone Temple Pilots
- Released: September 29, 1992
- Recorded: May 1992
- Studio: Rumbo Recorders (Los Angeles)
- Genres: Grunge; alternative metal; hard rock; alternative rock
- Length: 53:36
- Label: Atlantic
- Producer: Brendan O'Brien

Stone Temple Pilots chronology
Core (1992)	Purple (1994)

Singles from Core
- 1. "Sex Type Thing" Released: September 14, 1992; 2. "Plush" Released: February 15, 1993; 3. "Creep" Released: November 1, 1993

Core is the debut studio album by the American rock band Stone Temple Pilots, released by Atlantic Records on September 29, 1992.

Produced by Brendan O'Brien, Core became a massive commercial success, reaching number three on the Billboard 200 by July 1993 and has since been certified 8× Platinum by the Recording Industry Association of America (RIAA). The album spawned three singles: "Sex Type Thing", "Plush", and "Creep". "Plush" reached number one on the Billboard Album Rock Tracks, with the music video receiving heavy rotation on MTV. Stone Temple Pilots would go on to win two awards for "Plush": an MTV Video Music Award for Best New Artist and a Grammy for Best Hard Rock Performance.

The album initially received poor reviews despite its commercial success; the band was criticized for allegedly copying the musical style of other alternative acts, particularly Pearl Jam. Retrospectively, Core has been acknowledged as a seminal release of the alternative rock and grunge movement of the early 1990s. Core helped propel Stone Temple Pilots into the mainstream and remains their most commercially successful record. A 25th anniversary deluxe edition was released in 2017.

== Background and recording ==
In 1985, Scott Weiland and his friends in their band Soi-Disant – guitarist Corey Hicock and drummer David Allin – first encountered Robert DeLeo playing live at various gigs, deciding to track him down after witnessing his shows. Weiland and DeLeo would both move into an apartment in San Diego where they would begin to write music together and formed the band Swing. By 1989, drummer Eric Kretz and DeLeo's older brother who was a guitarist, Dean would join the band, which was renamed Mighty Joe Young. The band put out a demo in 1990 and slowly developed a huge following in the alternative rock scene of Southern California.

In the meantime, the band members would take on jobs to support themselves with Weiland working at a modeling agency and Robert at a guitar shop. Robert later said in 2017 that two would write songs during their spare time saying, "When either one of us had a musical idea, we'd call each other. He would usually have more time to run over and work it out. It was perfect because, since I was at a guitar shop, I could pick up a guitar right there. Scott didn't really play an instrument. When he had an idea, he would hum it to me."

When the recording sessions ended, the band named the album Core, which refers to the story of Adam and Eve in the Bible. This is further represented in the album cover which depicts Eve stealing an apple from the Tree of Eden. Robert DeLeo would record the album with a blue G&L L2000 Jazz Bass played on an Ampeg SVT with a Sennheiser 421. Eric Kretz would play on a Yamaha Rock Tour Custom drumset while Dean DeLeo used a 1978 Les Paul Standard. By August, Core was scheduled to be released and the album had reached the mastering stage when the band's lawyer received word that a blues musician had already claimed the name Mighty Joe Young. Weiland, who was a fan of the STP Motor Oil stickers since his youth, gave the band some ideas. Dean even suggested the name Stereo Temple Pirates which eventually would change into the name Stone Temple Pilots.

== Music and lyrics ==
Stone Temple Pilots are at their heaviest and darkest on Core, a more straightforward display of grunge and alternative metal than the band's following albums. It showcases them mixing the hard rock approach of the 1970s and the alternative rock sound, with a diverse range of other musical influences. The band found inspiration in the music of Pink Floyd, the Rolling Stones, the Beatles, Metallica, and Led Zeppelin according to Weiland. Tracks such as "Dead & Bloated", "Sex Type Thing", "Piece of Pie", and "Crackerman" explored a heavy edge combined with alternative tunings similar to Soundgarden and Alice In Chains, while "Wicked Garden", "Sin", "Creep", and "Plush" shared a jazzy and psychedelic tone within the chord progressions.

"You know how when you listen to a Led Zeppelin album, you listen to the entire album, not just the odd song? We wanted to make a record like that. We wanted to create a vibe which would run right through the whole album"

— Robert DeLeo

"Piece of Pie" originated from a demo called "Only Dying". It was supposed to be the band's contribution to the soundtrack of The Crow but was later pulled in the aftermath of actor Brandon Lee's death. "Big Empty", which was the first single to their second album Purple, was used as its replacement. The lyrics for "Plush" were written in a hot tub and used a real life story about a woman who was kidnapped and later found dead in the early 90s, which acts as a metaphor for a lost relationship. Kretz even mentioned the Day of the Dead festival as an inspiration, as well as the band's uncertainty about their future.

== Release ==
Core was released on September 29, 1992. It was certified gold on April 20, 1993, and platinum on June 9, 1993; the album has since been certified octuple platinum. The album peaked at number 3 on the Billboard 200 on July 3, 1993. Stone Temple Pilots set out on a tour, opening for Rage Against the Machine and Megadeth. The lead single "Sex Type Thing" was released on September 14, 1992 and received medium rotation on MTV. "Plush" was the band's breakthrough single, reaching number 1 on the Billboard Album Rock Tracks chart. The music video saw the band win the MTV Video music Award for Best New Artist in 1993, and the song won a Grammy Award for Best Hard Rock Performance in March 1994.

"Creep" was the third single and peaked at number 2 on the Billboard Album Rock Tracks chart. The band promoted Core with an American and European tour. In November 1993, the band recorded an episode of MTV Unplugged which aired in January 1994. The performance was never released as a standalone album and was only available in bootleg form for many years, until it was featured on the deluxe reissue of Core in 2017.

== Critical reception ==
Professional ratings
Review scores
Source	Rating
AllMusic	3.5/5 stars
Collector's Guide to Heavy Metal	7/10
Encyclopedia of Popular Music	3/5 stars
Entertainment Weekly	B
Kerrang!	4/5 stars
Q	(1993) (2017)
The Rolling Stone Album Guide	3/5 stars
Select	4/5 medals
Spin Alternative Record Guide	4/10
The Village Voice	B−

Core was initially ignored by critics upon its release. However, the band would start to gain notoriety as the album began receiving heavy airplay. Critics accused the band of allegedly stealing the musical sound of other popular alternative rock acts, primarily Pearl Jam. The lead single "Sex Type Thing" also garnered controversy, with many claiming the lyrics glorified date rape. Deborah Frost of Entertainment Weekly stated that the song was "Mike Tyson's rape defense transcribed into grunge rock. It's unclear whether STP, which sounds like it has crash-landed Pearl Jam into Alice in Chains, is condemning or identifying with its narrator. With a real point of view, this band could be bigger than an accident."

Paul Evans of Rolling Stone concluded that the "inner child of Stone Temple Pilots is Iron Maiden, and that kid just won't quit howling." Don Kaye of Kerrang! praised the band's "confidence and identity," unusual in debut albums. Jeremy Clarke of Select also gave a positive review saying, "Core is the real thing - a tough, loaded and listenable set with enough identity to pre-empt accusations of copycat tail-chasing. What makes STP matter isn't just their sound, but that they're a respectable attempt at metal with brains."

The increasing divide between the band's critics and fans was shown in a Rolling Stone issue in January 1994 in which the magazine's critics and readers labeled Stone Temple Pilots as the Worst and Best New Band respectively. During the band's reunion in 2008, Weiland reflected on the initial mixed reviews of Core, saying to Entertainment Weekly, "It was really painful in the beginning because I just assumed that the critics would understand where we were coming from, and that these just weren't dumb rock songs.

== Legacy ==
In the years since its release, Core has experienced a positive reevaluation. Several publications have considered Core as a standout and one of the seminal albums of the alternative rock scene of the early 1990s such as Ric Albano of Classic Rock Review who stated that, "the very fact that so many of the songs on Core have held up over the past two decades is testament to the quality of this material." Writing for Classic Rock, Emma Johnston wrote, "STP always encouraged their own hype, so this fully-stocked monument to their introduction to the world is a fitting one."

The singles "Sex Type Thing", "Wicked Garden", "Creep", and "Plush" continue to be rock radio staples in the United States. Core was ranked number ten (preceded by Eric Clapton's acoustic live album Unplugged) on Guitar World magazine's top ten list of guitar albums of 1992. Rolling Stone ranked the album at No. 11 on its list of the "50 Greatest Grunge Albums" in 2019

Core helped propel Stone Temple Pilots into the mainstream. A 25th Anniversary Deluxe Edition of Core which has a remastered version of the album, previously unreleased demos and b-sides, in addition to parts of three live performances from 1993 (Castaic Lake Natural Amphitheater, Reading Festival, and MTV Unplugged) was released on September 29, 2017. Core remains Stone Temple Pilots' best-selling album.

== Track listing ==
All lyrics are written by Scott Weiland, except where noted.

Core track listing
No.	Title	Lyrics	Music	Length
1.	"Dead & Bloated"		Robert DeLeo; Weiland	5:10
2.	"Sex Type Thing"		Dean DeLeo; Eric Kretz	3:37
3.	"Wicked Garden"		R. DeLeo; D. DeLeo	4:05
4.	"No Memory"	(Instrumental)	D. DeLeo	1:20
5.	"Sin"		R. DeLeo	6:04
6.	"Naked Sunday"		R. DeLeo; D. DeLeo; Kretz; Weiland	3:49
7.	"Creep"	Weiland; R. DeLeo	R. DeLeo	5:34
8.	"Piece of Pie"		R. DeLeo	5:24
9.	"Plush"	Weiland; Kretz	R. DeLeo	5:13
10.	"Wet My Bed"		R. DeLeo	1:36
11.	"Crackerman"		R. DeLeo; Kretz	3:14
12.	"Where the River Goes"		D. DeLeo; Kretz	8:30
Total length:				53:36

Demos & B-Sides
No.	Title	Lyrics	Music	Length
1.	"Only Dying" (Demo)		R. DeLeo; D. DeLeo; Kretz; Weiland	5:20
2.	"Wicked Garden" (Demo)		R. DeLeo; D. DeLeo	3:49
3.	"Naked Sunday" (Demo)		R. DeLeo; D. DeLeo; Kretz; Weiland	3:42
4.	"Where the River Goes" (Demo)		D. DeLeo; Kretz	7:17
5.	"Dead & Bloated" (Demo)		R. DeLeo; Weiland	5:04
6.	"Sex Type Thing" (Demo)		D. DeLeo; Kretz	3:24
7.	"Sin" (Demo)		R. DeLeo	6:15
8.	"Creep" (Demo)	Weiland; R. DeLeo	R. DeLeo	5:40
9.	"Plush" (Demo)	Weiland; Kretz	R. DeLeo	5:05
10.	"Sex Type Thing" (Swing Type Version)		D. DeLeo; Kretz	4:23
11.	"Plush" (Acoustic Type Version)	Weiland; Kretz	R. DeLeo	4:49
12.	"Creep" (New Album Version)	Weiland; R. DeLeo	R. DeLeo	5:34
13.	"Plush" (Plush (Acoustic From MTV Headbanger's Ball – Take 1))	Weiland; Kretz	R. DeLeo	5:28

Reissue Notes

- Tracks 1–4 are from the Mighty Joe Young demo sessions.
- Tracks 5–9 are from the Stone Temple Pilots demo sessions.
- Tracks 10–11 are from the "Plush" 12' German single.

== Personnel ==
All credits for Core are adapted from the album's liner notes.

Stone Temple Pilots

- Weiland – vocals
- Robert DeLeo – bass
- Dean DeLeo – guitars
- Eric Kretz – drums

Additional personnel

- Brendan O'Brien – production, mixing
- Nick DiDia – engineer
- Dick Kaneshiro – second engineer
- Danny Alonso – mix assistant (uncredited)
- Tom Baker – mastering
- Kevin Design Hosmann – art director
- Katrina Dickson – photography
- Christian Clayton – illustration
- Stone Temple Pilots – art concept

Reissue credits

- Jason Elzy – production for release
- Bill Inglot – production for release
- Liuba Shapiro Ruiz – product manager
- Dan Hersch – remastering
- Stone Temple Pilots – production ("Sex Type Thing (Swing Type Version)" and "Plush (Acoustic Type Version)"
- Ryan Williams – mixing ("Where the River Goes", "Dead & Bloated", "Sin", and "Creep" demos)
- Malcom Bevenish – mixing ("Creep (New Album Version")
- Katrina Dickson – Softpak outer panels and book photography
- Corey Hickok – Softpak inner panels and book front cover photography
- Dana Frank – photography
- Andy O'Beirne – book photography
- Robert DeLeo – miscellaneous emphermera photography
- Maja Roble – model
- Kate Dear – project assistance
- Amanda Smith – project assisance
- Steve Woolard – project assistance

== Charts ==
=== Weekly charts ===
Chart (1993)	Peak position
Australian Albums (ARIA)	29
Austrian Albums (Ö3 Austria)	21
Canadian Albums (RPM)	8
Dutch Albums (Album Top 100)	10
Europe (European Top 100 Albums)	38
Finnish Albums (Suomen virallinen lista)	22
German Albums (Offizielle Top 100)	53
New Zealand Albums (RMNZ)	11
Norwegian Albums (VG-lista)	20
Swedish Albums (Sverigetopplistan)	9
Swiss Albums (Schweizer Hitparade)	36
UK Albums (Official Charts)	27
UK Rock & Metal Albums (ERA)	2
US Billboard 200	3

Chart (2023)	Peak position
Hungarian Physical Albums (MAHASZ)	31

=== Year-end charts ===
Chart (1993)	Position
US Billboard 200	10

=== Decade-end charts ===
Chart (1990–1999)	Position
US Billboard 200	93

=== Singles ===
Title	Year	Peak chart positions									
Title	Year	US Pop Airplay	US Radio	US Alt.	US Main. Rock	AUS	CAN	NLD	NZ	SWE	UK
"Sex Type Thing"	1992	—	—	—	23	—	—	—	—	—	60
"Plush"	1993	18	39	9	1	47	21	15	23	18	23
"Wicked Garden"	1993	—	—	21	11	—	—	—	—	—	—
"Creep"	1993	—	59	12	2	76	45	—	24	—	—
"—" denotes a recording that did not chart or was not released in that territory.

== Certifications ==
Region	Certification	Certified units/sales
Australia (ARIA)	Platinum	70,000^{^}
Canada (Music Canada)	2× Platinum	200,000^{^}
New Zealand (RMNZ)	Platinum	15,000^{‡}
United Kingdom (BPI)	Silver	60,000^{^}
United States (RIAA)	8× Platinum	8,000,000^{^}
^{^} Shipments figures based on certification alone.^{‡} Sales+streaming figures based on certification alone.
