= Sex Type Thing =

1992 single by Stone Temple Pilots

- One of several covers used in the UK

Single by Stone Temple Pilots

from the album Core
- B-side: "Piece of Pie"; "Wicked Garden" (live); "Sin" (live)
- Released: September 14, 1992
- Recorded: May 1992
- Studio: Rumbo (Los Angeles)
- Genre: Grunge; alternative metal
- Length: 3:37
- Label: Atlantic
- Composers: Dean DeLeo; Eric Kretz
- Lyricist: Scott Weiland
- Producer: Brendan O'Brien

Stone Temple Pilots singles chronology
"Sex Type Thing" (1992)	"Plush" (1993)

Audio sample
- "Sex Type Thing": file; help

Music video
- "Sex Type Thing" on YouTube

"Sex Type Thing" is a song by the American rock band Stone Temple Pilots from their debut studio album, Core (1992). Atlantic Records serviced the song to US radio on September 14, 1992, as the band's debut and lead single from the album. "Sex Type Thing" peaked at number 23 on the US Album Rock Tracks chart and spawned a music video which received moderate rotation on MTV.

== Music video ==
During the grunge explosion of the 1990s, the music video for "Sex Type Thing" is usually denoted as the single factor that drove Stone Temple Pilots into the scene. The video was in medium-heavy rotation on MTV during the time, and helped make STP a contender in the grunge era. The video itself hosts a very dark motif, showing the band performing in a dungeon chamber, with singer Scott Weiland having bleached his hair blond, interspersed between clips of a dancer swinging on a chain and a woman in a prom dress surrounded by a ring of fire who then is being menaced before she rips her clothes off. Footage of a wild man dancing plays throughout. This video is rather distinctive because it is the first to showcase Scott Weiland's trademark "dance".

== Controversy ==
Upon the song's success, controversies regarding its lyrics emerged while STP was on tour opening for Megadeth. Weiland found himself in the position of defending "Sex Type Thing" to individuals who took the first-person approach he used in the song literally. In a 1993 interview with Rolling Stone, Weiland expressed his frustration with the song's reception by saying "It was, 'All right, the "Cop Killer" controversy's dead, let's try to find something else'...I never thought that people would ever seriously think that I was an advocate of date rape."

== Live performances ==
On March 12, 1993, Stone Temple Pilots performed the song on the British television program The Word, where Weiland wore a dress, lipstick, earrings and a tiara. Addressing the crowd before the performance, Weiland said: " To all those people out there in TV land, who are sexist, racist and homophobic morons, turn off your TV and put in a Rambo video."

== Track listings ==
European CD single

1. "Sex Type Thing – 3:37
2. "Wicked Garden – 4:04
3. "Plush (Acoustic)" – 3:52

CD single 1

1. "Sex Type Thing" – 3:37
2. "Piece of Pie" – 5:28
3. "Wicked Garden" (live) – 4:26
4. "Sin" (live) – 7:52

CD single 2

1. "Sex Type Thing" – 3:37
2. "Piece of Pie" – 5:28
3. "Dead and Bloated" (live) – 4:53
4. "Sex Type Thing" (live) – 4:01

All live tracks were recorded at the Reading Festival 1993.

== Charts ==
Chart performance for "Sex Type Thing"
Chart (1993)	Peak position
Australia (ARIA)	138
UK Singles (Official Charts)	60
US Mainstream Rock (Billboard)	23

== Release history ==
Release dates and formats for "Sex Type Thing"
Region	Date	Format(s)	Label(s)	Ref.
United States	September 14, 1992	Alternative radio; metal radio	Atlantic	
United Kingdom	March 15, 1993	12-inch vinyl; CD	Atlantic	
Australia	May 10, 1993	CD	Atlantic	
United Kingdom (re-release)	November 15, 1993	12-inch vinyl; CD; cassette	Atlantic	
