= Axis: Bold as Love =

Studio album by the Jimi Hendrix Experience
- Released: December 1, 1967
- Recorded: May–June, October 1967
- Studios: Olympic, London
- Genres: Psychedelic rock; pop rock; funk rock
- Length: 38:49
- Labels: Polydor / Track (UK); Reprise (US); Barclay (France)
- Producer: Chas Chandler

Jimi Hendrix US chronology
Are You Experienced (1967)	Axis: Bold as Love (1967)	Electric Ladyland (1968)

Jimi Hendrix UK chronology
Are You Experienced (1967)	Axis: Bold as Love (1967)	Smash Hits (1968)

Singles from Axis: Bold as Love
- 1. "Up from the Skies" / "One Rainy Wish" Released: February 28, 1968

Axis: Bold as Love is the second studio album by the Jimi Hendrix Experience. It was first released by Track Records in the United Kingdom on December 1, 1967, only seven months after the release of the group's highly successful debut album, Are You Experienced. In the United States, Reprise Records delayed the release until the following month. The album reached the top ten in the album charts in both countries.

The album displays several musical styles and critics saw it as demonstrating Jimi Hendrix's growth as a songwriter. It features "Spanish Castle Magic" and "Little Wing", two Hendrix compositions that draw on his roots performing with rhythm and blues bands and would remain in his live repertoire throughout his career. Its album cover generated controversy for displaying Hindu religious iconography. It was designed without Hendrix's approval, and he publicly expressed his dissatisfaction.

Like its predecessor, Axis: Bold as Love was a critical and commercial success, being certified platinum in the United States by the Recording Industry Association of America (RIAA) and silver in the UK by the British Phonographic Industry (BPI). In 2000, it was voted number 147 in Colin Larkin's All Time Top 1000 Albums (2000). Rolling Stone ranked it number 92 on its 2020 list of the "500 Greatest Albums of All Time".

== Recording ==
Following the completion of Are You Experienced at the end of April 1967, the Jimi Hendrix Experience continued their schedule of regular recording sessions, returning to Olympic Studios in London on May 4 to begin composing material for a follow-up LP. With Chas Chandler returning as producer and Eddie Kramer returning as engineer, along with George Chkiantz as second engineer, the band started the session by working on a Noel Redding original that he had written about hippies, titled "She's So Fine". It featured background vocals by Hendrix and Mitch Mitchell; Redding later recalled that Hendrix was enthusiastic to record the song because it was written in A with an open G chord that he enjoyed playing. They achieved a working master on the 23rd take, on which Redding overdubbed his lead vocal. (Note: Also recorded on May 4 was "Taking Care of No Business", a track Hendrix had written in 1965 while playing with Curtis Knight. The recording featured overdubbed background noises and vocal chatter that mimicked the sounds of a busy tavern. On May 5, Kramer prepared a reduction mix and Mitchell added a tambourine part.) The band also made initial recordings of what would become "If 6 Was 9", using the working titles of "Section A" and "Section B" to identify its two distinct segments. During a session the following day, Hendrix and Mitchell improved "Section B", now titled "Symphony of Experience", by re-recording most of their guitar and drum parts. A reduction mix prepared by Kramer made room for additional overdubs, including Hendrix's lead vocal, backing vocals, and a percussion effect created by Chandler, Hendrix, and guests Graham Nash and Gary Leeds stamping their feet on a drum riser. As an additional oddity, Hendrix played a recorder on the track, achieving what they considered a satisfactory sound despite his complete lack of formal training with the instrument. (Note: On May 5, after working on "If Six was Nine", the group shifted its focus to "Mr. Bad Luck", a medium-tempo blues song Hendrix had written during his time with Jimmy James and the Blue Flames. They quickly achieved a working master to which they added overdubs, including Hendrix's lead vocals, and although they thought the track showed promise it was not included on Axis: Bold as Love.) Also recorded during these sessions was the experimental track "EXP". In the span of two days, the group recorded basic tracks for seven compositions, though only three were included on the album.

I would fill the four basic tracks with stereo drums on two of the channels, the bass on the third, and Jimi's rhythm guitar on the fourth. From there, Chandler and I would mix this down to two tracks on another four-track recorder, giving us two more tracks to put on whatever we wanted, which usually included Jimi's lead guitar and vocals as well as backing vocals and some additional percussion.

— Eddie Kramer

On May 9, the Experience reconvened at Olympic with Chandler, Kramer and Chkiantz. Hendrix had been curious about a harpsichord that was stored in the facility's Studio A, so on this day he sat at the instrument and began writing "Burning of the Midnight Lamp", a song that became the fourth UK single for the Experience. Hendrix attempted four takes before stopping for the day, producing a rough demo that was approximately a minute and a half in length. On May 10, the band performed their latest single, "The Wind Cries Mary", on the BBC television program Top of the Pops.

After a month-long break from the studio while playing gigs in Europe, the Experience returned to Olympic on June 5. They devoted the session to a new Hendrix song titled "Cat Talking to Me", recording 17 takes before deciding that the second was the superior version, to which they added guitar and percussion overdubs after Kramer prepared a reduction mix. It was later included on the posthumous album West Coast Seattle Boy: The Jimi Hendrix Anthology (2010).

On June 18, 1967, the Experience made its U.S. debut at the Monterey Pop Festival. Immediately after the festival, Bill Graham booked them for a series of five concerts at the Fillmore. (Note: Following their successful West Coast introduction, which included a free open-air concert at Golden Gate Park and a concert at the Whisky a Go Go, the Experience were booked as the opening act for the first American tour of the Monkees.) While they were in California, Chandler booked session time for June 28, 29 and 30 at Houston Studios in Los Angeles. Although they worked on "Burning of the Midnight Lamp" and a new Hendrix composition, "The Stars That Play with Laughing Sam's Dice", they abandoned the inferior recordings. Chandler commented: "I booked three days there because I was told it was a state-of-the-art studio, but it was dire. The place was like a rehearsal studio compared to Olympic. Los Angeles was so far behind at that time." After a week of performances in Los Angeles and New York, time was booked at Mayfair Studios in London for July 6 and 7.

Axis: Bold As Love's scheduled release date was almost delayed when Hendrix lost the master tape of side one of the LP, leaving it in the back seat of a London taxi. With the deadline looming, Hendrix, Chas Chandler, and engineer Eddie Kramer remixed most of side one in a single overnight session, but they could not match the quality of the lost mix of "If 6 Was 9". Bassist Noel Redding had a tape recording of this mix, which had to be smoothed out with an iron as it had gotten wrinkled. During the verses, Hendrix doubled his singing with a guitar line which he played one octave lower than his vocals. Hendrix voiced his disappointment about having re-mixed the album so quickly, and he felt that it could have been better had they been given more time.

Kramer was patient with Hendrix, who often demanded numerous re-takes; however, by October 1967, Chandler had grown weary of the guitarist's perfectionism. Noel Redding was also frustrated by Hendrix's repeated demands for re-takes, and began to resent Hendrix's explicit instructions regarding what he played in the studio. Hendrix and Mitchell had begun to express their opinions regarding creative choices that had been left up to Chandler during the recording of Are You Experienced. Mitchell commented: "Axis was the first time that it became apparent that Jimi was pretty good working behind the mixing board, as well as playing, and had some positive ideas of how he wanted things recorded. It could have been the start of any potential conflict between him and Chas in the studio."

== Music and lyrics ==
Compared to Are You Experienced, the music on Axis is characterized by music critic Jim DeRogatis as "looser, jazzier, and more expansive."

The lyrics of "Spanish Castle Magic" were inspired by The Spanish Castle, a dance hall in what is now Des Moines, Washington, near Seattle where Hendrix jammed with local rock groups during his high school years. On "Little Wing" Hendrix plays his guitar through a Leslie speaker for the first time (a revolving speaker which creates a wavering effect, typically used with electric organs). According to Colin Larkin, Axis focuses less on guitar playing than Are You Experienced, and more on Hendrix's "gifts as a songwriter". Author Charles Shaar Murray described Axis as "lighter, looser and more melodic" than its predecessor.

Axis: Bold as Love opens with "EXP", which incorporates microphonic and harmonic feedback. It also showcases an experimental stereo panning effect in which sounds emanating from Hendrix's guitar move through the stereo image, revolving around the listener. The piece reflected his growing interest in science fiction and outer space. Author Keith Shadwick described the track as "some of the wildest music Hendrix ever released".

"Wait Until Tomorrow" is a pop song with an R&B guitar riff and Mitchell and Redding singing backing vocals. The fifth track, "Ain't No Telling", is a rock song with a complex structure despite its short length. Hendrix said that "Little Wing" was his impression of the Monterey Pop Festival put into the form of a girl. "If 6 Was 9", the last song on side one, is the album's longest track; some of the percussive effects were created by Gary Leeds (from the Walker Brothers) and Graham Nash stomping their feet.

"You Got Me Floatin'", a rock song opening with a swirling backwards guitar solo, opens the second side of the album. Roy Wood and Trevor Burton from the Move, who toured with Hendrix on a package tour through Britain during winter 1967, supplied backing vocals. According to Wood, he and Burton were in the studio next door while the song was being recorded, and Redding came by and asked them if they would like to sing on it. The following track, "Castles Made of Sand", is a ballad that also includes a backwards guitar solo. "She's So Fine", Redding's sole contribution to the album as a writer, is a quintessentially British pop and rock Who-influenced piece, featuring Redding on lead vocals with assistance from Mitchell. "One Rainy Wish" begins as a ballad waltz, but develops a rock feel during the chorus that is in a different time signature from the verses.

The song "Little Miss Lover" has elements of funk, while the final song of the album, "Bold as Love", with an extended guitar solo at the end, closes out the album. In 2004, Rolling Stone ranked "Little Wing" number 357 on its list of the "500 Greatest Songs of All Time", with its position rising to number 188 in the 2020 revision.

Hendrix composed the album's title track and finale around two verses and two choruses, during which he pairs emotions with personas, comparing them to colors. The song's coda features the first recording of stereo phasing. (Note: As with their previous album, the band had to schedule recording sessions in between performances.) Numerous attempts at a basic rhythm track were undertaken before a satisfactory one was achieved on the 27th take. Shadwick described the composition as "possibly the most ambitious piece on Axis, the extravagant metaphors of the lyrics suggesting a growing confidence" in Hendrix's songwriting. His guitar playing throughout the song is marked by chordal arpeggios and contrapuntal motion, with tremolo-picked partial chords providing the musical foundation for the chorus, which culminates in what musicologist Andy Aledort described as "simply one of the greatest electric guitar solos ever played". The track fades out on tremolo-picked thirty-second note double stops. In 2011, Guitar World ranked the track number 24 in a list of Hendrix's 100 greatest performances.

== Artwork and packaging ==
The album cover depicts Hendrix and the Experience as various forms of Vishnu, incorporating a painting of the musicians by Roger Law, from a photo-portrait by Karl Ferris. Melody Maker journalist Nick Jones described the artwork as a "beautiful fold out package" that compensated for the "very poor presentation" of Are You Experienced. Likening the design to the cover image on the Beatles' recent Sgt. Pepper's Lonely Hearts Club Band, he said it showed Hendrix "with a lot of freaky looking Indian cats and gods, sages and one guy with an elephant's trunk for a nose or something!"

Hendrix expressed dismay at the choice of cover art. He stated that the cover would have been more appropriate had it highlighted his Native American heritage. The painted image of the Experience was then superimposed on top of a copy of a mass-produced religious poster. Hendrix commented: "The three of us have nothing to do with what's on the Axis cover." Unlike the previous album's cover art, both the UK and US editions featured the same image.

Some Hindus have since expressed anger over the use of religious images for the album's artwork. The Malaysian government's Home Ministry instituted a ban on the album's art in response to complaints.

== Release and reception ==
Retrospective professional reviews
Review scores
Source	Rating
AllMusic	5/5 stars
Blender	3/5 stars
Down Beat	4.5/5 stars
Encyclopedia of Popular Music	5/5 stars
The Great Rock Discography	9/10
MusicHound Rock	5/5
PopMatters	10/10
Q	4/5 stars
Rolling Stone	5/5 stars
The Rolling Stone Album Guide	5/5 stars

Track released Axis: Bold as Love in the UK on December 1, 1967, where it peaked at number five and spent 16 weeks on the charts. In February 1968, it charted at number three in the United States. The album was also well received by music critics, who praised its mixture of hard rock, rhythm and blues, and jazz.

In his preview of the album for Rolling Stone, Nick Jones described it as "at times shatteringly beautiful" and highlighted "Spanish Castle Magic". Reviewing Axis in the same publication, Jim Miller hailed it as "the refinement of white noise into psychedelia ... the finest voodoo album that any rock group has produced to date". Q magazine wrote in a retrospective review that the album "dazzles as the Experience creates a genre probably short-lived because nobody else could play it". AllMusic's Cub Koda considered it a demonstration of Hendrix's "remarkable growth and depth" as a songwriter, utilizing Curtis Mayfield-like soul guitar work, "Dylanesque lyrical imagery, and Fuzz Face hyperactivity to produce yet another side to his grand psychedelic musical vision". According to author Peter Doggett, the record "heralded a new subtlety in Hendrix's work", while BBC Music's Chris Jones said it is distinguished from his other Hendrix albums as his "coming-of-age-in-songwriting album ... his peak in crafting pop rock perfection".

Some critics have found Axis: Bold as Love to be the least memorable of the Experience's three studio releases. According to Richie Unterberger, it was the least impressive from the Experience, while Kris Needs called the record a "transitional, but often overlooked, masterpiece". Reviewing Hendrix's back catalogue in 2005 for Blender, Robert Christgau acknowledged the adequate production and guitar quality on the album, and praised the fluidity of Mitchell's drumming; he criticised, however, the music's "spaced-out lightness", and the brevity of some tracks: "half the songs are forgettable as songs if fine as recordings."

In 2000, it was voted number 147 in Colin Larkin's All Time Top 1000 Albums. Rolling Stone ranked Axis: Bold as Love number 92 on its 2020 list of the "500 Greatest Albums of All Time". It also received the top spot on their list of the 40 greatest stoner albums in 2013. Guitarist magazine named the album number 7 on their list of "the most influential guitar albums of all time". In 2015, Consequence of Sound described the album as a "compelling psychedelic masterpiece". The album is also included in the book 1001 Albums You Must Hear Before You Die.

The Hendrix Estate released, "The Jimi Hendrix Experience: Bold As Love Sessions" a 4CD/1-Blu-ray, or 5LP/1 Blu-ray, Box Set November 7, 2025. It contains 66 Tracks including Demos and Alternate takes plus the Stereo and Mono versions of the album. The Blu-Ray contains Both of the 1967 Stereo and Mono versions of the album plus a Dolby ATMOS mix.

== Track listing ==
The original UK Track and US Reprise albums did not list running times for the songs. Instead, they are taken from the Reprise monaural promotional album. All songs written by Jimi Hendrix, except "She's So Fine" by Noel Redding.

Side one
No.	Title	Length
1.	"EXP"	1:55
2.	"Up from the Skies"	2:55
3.	"Spanish Castle Magic"	3:00
4.	"Wait Until Tomorrow"	3:00
5.	"Ain't No Telling"	1:46
6.	"Little Wing"	2:24
7.	"If Six Was Nine" (US edition spelling "If 6 Was 9")	5:32

Side two
No.	Title	Length
1.	"You've Got Me Floating" (US edition spelling "You Got Me Floatin'")	2:45
2.	"Castles Made of Sand"	2:46
3.	"She's So Fine"	2:37
4.	"One Rainy Wish"	3:40
5.	"Little Miss Lover"	2:20
6.	"Bold as Love"	4:09
Total length:		38:49

== Personnel ==
The Jimi Hendrix Experience

- Jimi Hendrix – vocals, electric guitar, piano, recorder, glockenspiel on "Little Wing", harpsichord on "Bold as Love", voice of Mr. Paul Caruso on "EXP"
- Noel Redding – bass guitars (four- and eight-string bass), backing vocals, foot stomping on "If 6 Was 9", lead vocals on "She's So Fine"
- Mitch Mitchell – drums, backing vocals, interviewer on "EXP"

Additional personnel

- Gary Leeds – foot stamping on "If 6 Was 9"
- Graham Nash – foot stamping on "If 6 Was 9", backing vocals on "You Got Me Floatin'"
- Trevor Burton – backing vocals on "You Got Me Floatin'"
- Roy Wood – backing vocals on "You Got Me Floatin'"

Production

- Chas Chandler – producer, foot stomping on "If 6 Was 9"
- Eddie Kramer – chief engineer
- George Chkiantz, Andy Johns and Terry Brown – engineers
- Cover art – David King, Roger Law, painted heads based on a Karl Ferris group portrait (front)
- Donald Silverstein – photography (UK inner portrait)

== Charts and certifications ==
Charts (1967–1968)
Chart	Peak position
Germany Charts	21
Norway Charts	12
UK Official Charts	5
US Billboard Top LPs	3
US Top R&B Albums	6

Charts (2025)
Chart	Peak position
German Rock & Metal Albums (Offizielle Top 100)	14

Certifications
Region	Certification	Certified units/sales
United Kingdom (BPI)	Gold	100,000^{^}
United States (RIAA)	Platinum	1,000,000^{^}
^{^} Shipments figures based on certification alone.

== Notes and references ==
Footnotes

Citations

Sources

- Aledort, Andy (1996). Jimi Hendrix: A Step-by-Step Breakdown of his Guitar Styles and Techniques. Hal Leonard. ISBN 0-7935-3659-6.
- Black, Johnny (1999). Jimi Hendrix: The Ultimate Experience. Thunder's Mouth Press. ISBN 978-1-56025-240-5.
- Cross, Charles R. (2005). Room Full of Mirrors: A Biography of Jimi Hendrix. Hyperion. ISBN 978-0-7868-8841-2.
- Doggett, Peter (2004). Jimi Hendrix: The Complete Guide to his Music. Omnibus. ISBN 978-1-84449-424-8.
- George-Warren, Holly, ed. (2001). The Rolling Stone Encyclopedia of Rock & Roll (2005 revised and updated ed.). Fireside. ISBN 978-0-7432-9201-6.
- Guitar World (December 2011). "Jimi Hendrix's 100 Greatest Performances". Guitar World. 32 (12).
- Heatley, Michael (2009). Jimi Hendrix Gear: The Guitars, Amps & Effects that Revolutionized Rock 'n' Roll. Voyageur Press. ISBN 978-0-7603-3639-7.
- Hendrix, Janie L.; McDermott, John (2007). Jimi Hendrix: An Illustrated Experience. Atria. ISBN 978-0-7432-9769-1.
- Larkin, Colin (1998). Virgin All-time Top 1000 Albums. Virgin. ISBN 978-0-7535-0258-7.
- Levy, Joe, ed. (2005). Rolling Stone's 500 Greatest Albums of All Time (First Paperback ed.). Wenner Books. ISBN 978-1-932958-61-4.
- McDermott, John (1992). Lewisohn, Mark (ed.). Hendrix: Setting the Record Straight. Grand Central. ISBN 978-0-446-39431-4.
- McDermott, John (2009). Ultimate Hendrix: An Illustrated Encyclopedia of Live Concerts and Sessions. BackBeat Books. ISBN 978-0-87930-938-1.
- McDermott, John (2010). West Coast Seattle Boy: The Jimi Hendrix Anthology (CD set booklet). Jimi Hendrix. New York City: Legacy. OCLC 822580228. 88697769272.
- Mitchell, Mitch; Platt, John (1990). Jimi Hendrix: Inside the Experience. St. Martin's Press. ISBN 978-0-312-10098-8.
- Moskowitz, David (2010). The Words and Music of Jimi Hendrix. Praeger. ISBN 978-0-313-37592-7.
- Murray, Charles Shaar (1989). Crosstown Traffic: Jimi Hendrix and the Rock 'n' Roll Revolution (First US ed.). St. Martin's Press. ISBN 978-0-312-04288-2.
- Roberts, David, ed. (2005). British Hit Singles & Albums (18 ed.). Guinness World Records Limited. ISBN 978-1-904994-00-8.
- Roby, Steven (2002). Black Gold: The Lost Archives of Jimi Hendrix. Billboard Books. ISBN 978-0-8230-7854-7.
- Shadwick, Keith (2003). Jimi Hendrix: Musician. Backbeat Books. ISBN 978-0-87930-764-6.
- Shapiro, Harry; Glebbeek, Caesar (1995) [1990]. Jimi Hendrix: Electric Gypsy (New and Improved ed.). St. Martin's Press. ISBN 978-0-312-13062-6.
- Stubbs, David (2003). Voodoo Child: Jimi Hendrix, the Stories Behind Every Song. Thunder's Mouth Press. ISBN 978-1-56025-537-6.
- Unterberger, Richie (2009). The Rough Guide to Jimi Hendrix. Rough Guides. ISBN 978-1-84836-002-0.
- Wenner, Jann (2010) [2004]. 500 Greatest Songs of All Time. Rolling Stone. OCLC 641731526.
- Whitehill, Dave (1989). Hendrix: Axis: Bold As Love. Hal Leonard. ISBN 978-0-7935-2391-7.

Further reading

- Barker, Steve (2012) [1967]. "Jimi Hendrix talks to Steve Barker". In Roby, Steven (ed.). Hendrix on Hendrix: Interviews and Encounters with Jimi Hendrix. Chicago Review Press. ISBN 978-1-61374-322-5.
- Brown, Tony (1992). Jimi Hendrix: A Visual Documentary -His Life, Loves and Music. Omnibus Press. ISBN 978-0-7119-2761-2.
- Etchingham, Kathy (1999). Through Gypsy Eyes Hendrix. Firebird Distributing. ISBN 978-0-7528-2725-4.
- Fairchild, Michael (April 1991). "The Experience of a Lifetime". Guitar: For the Practicing Musician. 8 (6).
- GP staff (May 2012). "Hendrix at 70". Guitar Player. 46 (5).
- Geldeart, Gary; Rodham, Rodham (2008). Jimi Hendrix from the Benjamin Franklin Studios. Jimpress. ISBN 978-0-9527686-7-8.
- Halfin, Ross; Tolinski, Brad (2004). Classic Hendrix. Genesis Publications. ISBN 978-0-904351-90-3.
- di Perna, Alan (2002) [2000]. Kitts, Jeff (ed.). "Jimi Live!: Wild Thing". Guitar Legends (57).
- Lawrence, Sharon (2005). Jimi Hendrix: The Intimate Story of a Betrayed Musical Legend. Harper. ISBN 978-0-06-056301-1.
- Marshall, Wolf (1995). Marshall, Wolf (ed.). "Wild Thing". Wolf Marshall's Guitar One. 2.
- Mayer, John (2011). "Jimi Hendrix". In Brackett, Nathan (ed.). Rolling Stone: The 100 Greatest Artists of All Time. Rolling Stone.
- Morello, Tom (December 8, 2011). Wenner, Jann (ed.). "Rolling Stone: The 100 Greatest Guitarists of All Time – Jimi Hendrix". Rolling Stone. No. 1145.
- Owen, Frank; Reynolds, Simon (April 1991). "Hendrix Lives! Why Jimi still matters". Spin. 7 (1).
- Potash, Chris, ed. (1996). The Jimi Hendrix Companion. Omnibus. ISBN 978-0-7119-6635-2.
- Roby, Steven; Schreiber, Brad (2010). Becoming Jimi Hendrix: From Southern Crossroads to Psychedelic London, the Untold Story of a Musical Genius. Da Capo. ISBN 978-0-306-81910-0.
- Roby, Steven (2012). Hendrix on Hendrix: Interviews and Encounters with Jimi Hendrix. Chicago Review Press. ISBN 978-1-61374-322-5.
- Whitaker, Matthew C. (2011). Icons of Black America: Breaking Barriers and Crossing Boundaries. Vol. 1. Greenwood. ISBN 978-0-313-37642-9.
- Whitburn, Joel (1988). Joel Whitburn's Top R&B Singles, 1942–1988. Record Research, Inc. ISBN 978-0-89820-068-3.

Documentaries

- Joe Boyd, John Head, Gary Weis (Directors) (2005) [1973]. Jimi Hendrix (DVD). Warner Home Video. ASIN B0009E3234.
- Roger Pomphrey (Director) (2005). Classic Albums – The Jimi Hendrix Experience – Electric Ladyland (DVD). Eagle Rock Entertainment. ASIN B0007DBJP0.
- Bob Smeaton (Director) (2013). Jimi Hendrix: Hear My Train A Comin' (DVD, Blu-ray). Sony Legacy. ASIN B00F031WB8.
- Bob Smeaton (Director) (2012). West Coast Seattle Boy: Jimi Hendrix: Voodoo Child (DVD, Blu-ray). Sony Legacy. ASIN B007ZC92FA.
