= Shaimus =

- Origin: Boston, Massachusetts
- Genres: Alternative rock, pop rock, indie rock
- Years active: 2004–2012
- Members: Phil Beaudreau (lead vocals, keys); Lou Beaudreau (guitar, vocals); Cam Brousseau (drums, percussion); Evan Brown (lead guitar, vocals); Johannes Raassina (bass)
- Past members: Dave Middleton (guitar) (2004–2009)
- Website: www.shaimus.com

Shaimus was an alternative rock band that formed in Boston, Massachusetts in 2004. The band made an appearance in the 2010 film The Roommate, which features the songs "Let Go" and "Tie You Down" and includes on-screen performances by Brousseau, Brown and Raassina as members of actor Cam Gigandet's fictional band. As of 2010, Shaimus resided in Los Angeles.

== Background ==
Shaimus formed in November 2004 when all five original members attended Berklee College of Music. The band moved to Los Angeles, where they released two self-produced albums independently. Shaimus licensed their first album's music to MTV and signed a publishing deal with North Star Media in 2009, leading to song placements on TV shows such as One Tree Hill and the 2010 film The Roommate. They signed a "Friends" deal with MySpace Music the same year, which led to their music video for "Like a Fool" being featured on the front page of the MySpace Music site. In early 2009, original guitarist Dave Middleton quit the band. He was replaced by lead singer Phil Beaudreau's brother, Lou, a few months later.

Shaimus embarked on West Coast tours in 2006 and 2009. The Seattle PI's "Big Blog" recommended them as one of their top 8 weekend ideas in November 2009.

== Guitar Hero and Rock Band ==
Phil Beaudreau and Johannes Raassina worked in the QA department at video game developer Harmonix Music Systems while living in Boston.

== Musical style ==
Stylistically, the band calls themselves alternative rock. The Portland Mercury compared Shaimus to Rooney, Ozma and Weezer, calling them a "melodic rock act" that was "too indie for the major labels, too commercial for the indies." Los Angeles blog Buzz Bands described them as "almost ridiculously competent," "largely irony-free", and "hookier than hell." In Rock Band 2, "Like a Fool" is categorized as indie rock.

== The Roommate ==
Band members Cam Brousseau, Evan Brown, and Johannes Raassina filmed scenes for the Screen Gems film The Roommate in spring of 2009. In the film, Brousseau, Brown, and Raassina play members of actor Cam Gigandet's fictional on screen band. Since Gigandet played the drummer of the band and Beaudreau was unavailable to attend the shoot, Brousseau pretended to be the lead singer and keyboard player. The Shaimus songs "Tie You Down" and "Let Go" are featured in the film.

== Appearances in media ==
- The song "Slow Down" appeared on the Australian TV show Bill's Food.
- The song "Tie You Down" appeared in the TV show Ruby & The Rockits.
- The song "Left to Dry" appeared in the TV show One Tree Hill.
- The songs "Tie You Down" and "Let Go" appeared in the film The Roommate. Band members Brousseau, Brown and Raassina appeared onscreen in the film.
- The song "All of This" appeared in Guitar Hero.
- The song "Like a Fool" was released as a free downloadable track for Rock Band 2. "All of This" and "Tie You Down" were made available as downloadable content for Rock Band, Rock Band 2, and Lego Rock Band on March 9, 2010.

== Discography ==
=== Full-length albums ===
- Paper Sun (2006)
- The Sad Thing Is, We Like It Here (2009)
- Shaimus (2012)
