= One Rainy Wish =

Single by The Jimi Hendrix Experience

from the album Axis: Bold as Love
- A-side: "Up from the Skies"
- Released: December 1, 1967
- Recorded: October 29, 1967
- Studio: Olympic Sound, London
- Genre: Psychedelic rock; R&B
- Length: 3:43
- Label: Track
- Songwriter: Jimi Hendrix
- Producer: Chas Chandler

"One Rainy Wish" (also known as "Golden Rose") is a song by the Jimi Hendrix Experience, featured on their 1967 second album Axis: Bold as Love. The song was written by Jimi Hendrix based on a dream that he had in which "the sky was filled with a thousand stars ... and eleven moons played across the rainbows," according to the song's lyrics. Shortly after the release of Axis: Bold as Love, "One Rainy Wish" was featured as the B-side to "Up from the Skies", released in February 1968.

== Background and style ==
"One Rainy Wish" was "one of Jimi [Hendrix]'s many songs born out of a dream". The style of guitar playing displayed by Hendrix is said to be reminiscent of that of American jazz guitarists Jim Hall and Wes Montgomery, according to fellow guitarist Mike Stern, who said the following about the song:

His playing is so lyrical. It has that same singing quality that I dig in Jim Hall's playing or Wes Montgomery's playing. But the thing about Hendrix was that he had that sound, he could achieve that lyrical feeling with a fatter sound on his Strat than you could get with a regular hollow-bodied jazz guitar.

In the Hendrix biography Jimi Hendrix: Electric Gypsy, the song is described as "creak[ing] with radical harmonies and rhythmic concepts, not least the fact that the verse is in 3/4 time while the chorus is in 4/4." "One Rainy Wish" was recorded sometime midway through the Axis: Bold as Love sessions, in October 1967, at Olympic Sound Studios with producer Chas Chandler and engineer Eddie Kramer.

== Reception ==
In reviews of Axis: Bold as Love, "One Rainy Wish" has generally been positively regarded, although some critics do not like the ending. In a review for the BBC, critic Chris Jones noted the song as one of the album's examples of Hendrix's "loveliest lyrics," while critic Cub Koda described the song as a "beautiful, wistful ballad."
