= Up from the Skies =

- Spanish single picture sleeve

Single by the Jimi Hendrix Experience

from the album Axis: Bold as Love
- B-side: "One Rainy Wish"
- Released: February 26, 1968
- Recorded: October 29, 1967
- Studio: Olympic, London
- Genre: Psychedelic rock; jazz fusion
- Length: 2:55
- Label: Reprise
- Songwriter: Jimi Hendrix
- Producer: Chas Chandler

Experience US singles chronology
"Foxey Lady" (1967)	"Up from the Skies" (1968)	"All Along the Watchtower" (1968)

"Up from the Skies" is a song written by Jimi Hendrix. Recorded by the Jimi Hendrix Experience in 1967, it was released on their second album Axis: Bold as Love. The lyrics reflect Hendrix's interest in science fiction and relate an extraterrestrial visitor's curiosity about life on Earth. Musically, it incorporates elements of jazz, particularly in drummer Mitch Mitchell's use of brushes.

In 1968, the Experience's American record company, Reprise Records, released the song as a single, which reached number 82 on the Billboard Hot 100 chart.

== Background and style ==
"Up From the Skies" was recorded on October 29, 1967, the last day of recording for Axis: Bold as Love, at Olympic Sound Studios in London. AllMusic reviewer Matthew Greenwald described the song as "a breezy, jazz-based stroll, and it's quite different from anything on his debut album". Biographer Harry Shapiro commented on the "easy triplet jazz feel", bringing attention to the "delicate wah-wah and Mitch [Mitchell]'s brush-work".

The lyrics are told from perspective of a visiting alien "concerned about what has happened to [Earth] since the last time he passed through". Greenwald suggests that this motif is adopted to "[address] the older generation and their flaws and judgements against the youth of the 1960s", which Hendrix supposedly does "with a sense of idle curiosity rather than distaste, not unlike an alien visiting the planet Earth for the first time".

== Reception ==
Despite being less commercially successful than previous singles, "Up from the Skies" was generally well-received critically. In an album review for Rolling Stone, critic Parke Puterbaugh identified the song as an effective opening song for the album, suggesting that "'Up From the Skies', the mission statement of Axis: Bold As Love, [draws] the ear into an album that wanted to take you higher, past gravity or limits of any kind". Music writer Cub Koda summarized the song as a "spacy rocker". Cash Box said that Hendrix is in a "funkier groove" here than some of his previous singles, saying the song is "almost a step back into blues of the mid-fifties but with some contemporary guitar antics that are straight from the today trends."
