= Chris Armold =

American author

- Occupations: Writer, photographer
- Writing career
- Pen name: Chris A.
- Genre: Non-fiction

Chris Armold (a.k.a. Chris A.) is an American author. He wrote A Vulgar Display of Power: Courage and Carnage at the Alrosa Villa in 2007, a recounting of the shooting at a Damageplan concert at the Alrosa Villa, where Dimebag Darrell, Jeff "Mayhem" Thompson, Erin Halk, and Nathan Bray were killed and three others were wounded by a deranged fan.

Armold is also the author of Steel Pots, The History of America's Steel Combat Helmets and Painted Steel, Steel Pots Volume II.
