= Kiss Kasket =

Merchandise from the band Kiss

The Kiss Kasket is an item of merchandise licensed by the rock band Kiss. It is a casket decorated with a Kiss logo and pictures of the band members. In introducing the Kiss Kasket, Gene Simmons said, "I love livin', but this makes the alternative look pretty damn good." The Kiss Kasket went on sale in 2001; as of 2008, the original incarnation was no longer available from Kiss's website. As of February 2011, the second-generation models of the Kiss Kasket became available on Kiss's website.

Dimebag Darrell, the guitarist of Pantera and Damageplan, was buried in a Kiss Kasket donated by Simmons at Darrell's funeral in 2004. His brother, Vinnie Paul—the drummer of Pantera, Damageplan, and Hellyeah—was also buried in a Kiss Kasket at his funeral in 2018.

== Reintroduction — second generation ==
On December 1, 2010, Kissonline.com announced a new licensing agreement between Kiss and Eternal Image Inc. (a public company engaged in the designing, manufacturing, and marketing of officially licensed memorial products) to design, manufacture, and market a limited-edition line of official Kiss-branded memorial products. The line will reportedly include caskets, cremation urns, bronze memorials, memorial prayer cards, registry books, memorial candles, and pet cremation urns—-all designed after the famous rock band's iconic images.

Wrap Wizard, a division of Sign & Graphic Solutions, Inc. located in Newnan, Georgia produced the first mock-up of the New and improved Kiss Kasket for Gene Simmons of Kiss on December 10, 2010. Five days later, on December 15, Kissonline.com provided a sneak peek and announced that the newest second generation Kiss Kaskets are in production.

On the final day of December, 2010, Eternal Image, Inc. announced on its website that the latest Kiss Kaskets will be available for purchase by the end of February 2011. On February 14, 2011, Eternal Image, Inc. announced that two models of the Kiss Kasket (a premium model and a standard model) are now available, including images and details of the two second-generation caskets.
