= Suicide Note (song) =

1996 single by Pantera

"Suicide Note Pt. 1"

Promotional single by Pantera

from the album The Great Southern Trendkill
- Released: May 22, 1996
- Recorded: 1995
- Genre: Southern rock
- Length: 4:44
- Label: East West
- Songwriters: Dimebag Darrell; Vinnie Paul; Phil Anselmo; Rex Brown
- Producers: Terry Date; Vinnie Paul

Pantera promotional single chronology
"Becoming" (1994)	"Suicide Note Pt. 1" (1996)	"Floods" (1996)

"Suicide Note Pt. 2"

Song by Pantera

from the album The Great Southern Trendkill
- Released: May 7, 1996
- Recorded: 1995
- Genre: Grindcore; groove metal; death metal; thrash metal
- Length: 4:19
- Label: East West
- Songwriters: Dimebag Darrell; Vinnie Paul; Phil Anselmo; Rex Brown
- Producers: Terry Date; Vinnie Paul

"Suicide Note" is a two-part song by American heavy metal band Pantera from their eighth studio album, The Great Southern Trendkill. The first half of the song was released as the album's second single in 1996. The combination total time is 9 minutes and 3 seconds.

The first part of the song was nominated for a Grammy Award in 1997.

== Background ==
"Suicide Note Pt. I" is a power ballad that features 12-string acoustic guitars, keyboards, and bass drum beats in the style of a heartbeat. Guitarist Dimebag Darrell told Guitar World magazine in 1996 that he wrote all the guitar parts of the song the first time he picked up a 12-string guitar that Washburn Guitars had sent him in recognition of his new endorsement of the company.

The song breaks into "Suicide Note Pt. II", which in stark contrast to Pt. I, is a fast-tempo song featuring low tunings, screamed vocals throughout, and a breakdown at its climax. The main riff in Pt. II features extensive use of the DigiTech Whammy effects pedal, which is used throughout most of the song including the chaotic solo.

Pt. I was omitted from the original vinyl pressing of The Great Southern Trendkill in 1996. It was however included on a limited edition 24 bit audiophile pressing in 2012.

The lyrics describe suicide attempts such as slitting of the wrist. Pt. I mentions drug use in particular, whereas Pt. II describes the determination of suicide by gunshot.

== Reception ==
Metal Hammer ranked the first part of the song number 24 on their list of the 50 best Pantera songs, while the second part of the song ranked at number 20.

Loudwire ranked both parts number eight on their list of the top 10 Pantera songs.

== Track listing ==
No.	Title	Length
1.	"Suicide Note, Pt. I" (Live Through This Night Remix Edit)	3:55
2.	"Suicide Note, Pt. I" (Live Through This Night Remix)	4:56

== Personnel ==
=== Part I ===
- Philip Anselmo – lead vocals
- Dimebag Darrell – 12-string acoustic guitar

==== Additional personnel ====
- Big Ross – keyboards

=== Part II ===
- Philip Anselmo – lead vocals
- Dimebag Darrell – guitars
- Rex Brown – bass
- Vinnie Paul – drums

==== Additional personnel ====
- Seth Putnam (of Anal Cunt) – additional vocals
