= Dimebag Darrell =

American guitarist (1966–2004)

"Dimebag" Darrell Abbott
- Abbott performing in 1994
- Born: Darrell Lance Abbott; August 20, 1966; Grand Prairie, Texas, U.S.
- Died: December 8, 2004 (aged 38); Columbus, Ohio, U.S.
- Cause of death: Gunshot wounds (murdered during the Columbus nightclub shooting)
- Resting place: Moore Memorial Gardens, Arlington, Texas
- Other name: Diamond Darrell (1981–1993)
- Occupation: Musician
- Years active: 1981–2004
- Partner: Rita Haney (1984–2004)
- Relatives: Jerry Abbott (father); Vinnie Paul (brother)
- Musical career
- Genres: Groove metal; heavy metal; Southern metal; glam metal (early)
- Instrument: Guitar
- Works: Full list
- Formerly of: Pantera; Damageplan; Rebel Meets Rebel; Gasoline
- Website: dimebagdarrell.com

Darrell Lance Abbott (August 20, 1966 – December 8, 2004), known professionally as Dimebag Darrell, was an American musician. He was the guitarist of the heavy metal bands Pantera and Damageplan, both of which he co-founded with his brother Vinnie Paul. He is considered one of the greatest heavy metal guitarists of all time.

A son of country music producer Jerry Abbott, Abbott began playing guitar at age 12, and Pantera released its debut album, Metal Magic (1983), when he was 16. Originally a glam metal musician, Abbott went by the stage name Diamond Darrell at the time. Two further albums in the glam metal style followed with Projects in the Jungle (1984) and I Am the Night (1985), before original vocalist Terry Glaze was replaced by Phil Anselmo in 1986 and Power Metal (1988) was released. The band's major-label debut, Cowboys from Hell (1990), introduced a groove metal sound to which Abbott's guitar playing was central. This sound was refined on Vulgar Display of Power (1992), and the group's third major-label record, Far Beyond Driven, debuted at No. 1 on the Billboard 200 in 1994.

Tensions within Pantera reduced its output after the release of The Great Southern Trendkill in 1996, and Reinventing the Steel (2000) was the band's final studio album before its acrimonious separation in 2003. Abbott subsequently formed Damageplan with his brother Vinnie Paul and released New Found Power, the band's only album, in 2004. Other works by Abbott included a collaboration with David Allan Coe titled Rebel Meets Rebel (2006) and numerous guest guitar solos for bands such as Anthrax. While on tour with Damageplan, Abbott was shot and killed by Nathan Gale during a performance at the Alrosa Villa nightclub in Columbus, Ohio on December 8, 2004. Three others were shot and killed before Gale was killed by a police officer.

Abbott was ranked at No. 92 on Rolling Stone's list of "The 100 Greatest Guitarists of All Time" in 2011, and No. 19 on Louder's list of "The 50 Greatest Guitarists of All Time" in 2018. He placed at No. 5 on Gibson's list of "The Top 10 Metal Guitarists of All Time" in 2015, and the same year was ranked as the most influential metal guitarist of the past 25 years by VH1.

== Early life ==
Darrell Lance Abbott was born in Grand Prairie, Texas, on August 20, 1966, the second son to Carolyn and Jerry Abbott, a country music producer. He had an older brother, Vincent Paul Abbott, born 1964. Abbott's parents divorced in 1979, after seventeen years of marriage, but his family life remained happy. The brothers lived with their mother Carolyn, in a ranch-style house on Monterrey Street in Arlington. Carolyn was supportive of her sons' musical endeavors. Their father Jerry remained in the area after the divorce and Darrell would often go on a bicycle to visit him for guitar lessons "pretty darned regular".

Abbott took up the guitar when he was 12 years old. His first guitar was a Les Paul-style Hondo, which he received along with a Pignose amplifier on his twelfth birthday. Influenced by Black Sabbath, Judas Priest, Kiss and Van Halen, he would initially spend time in his room standing in front of a mirror holding the guitar while wearing Ace Frehley-style makeup, though he was unable to play the instrument at the time. Jerry learned Kiss songs on guitar in order to teach Darrell how to play them. Darrell also learned from country musicians who recorded at Jerry's studio, such as Bugs Henderson.

Vinnie had begun playing the drums before Darrell received his first guitar. Darrell had previously tried to play the drums; Vinnie later said: "I just got better than him and wouldn't let him play them anymore." The Abbott brothers' first jam session consisted of six hours of "Smoke on the Water". They took inspiration from Alex and Eddie Van Halen, and Vinnie said in a 2016 interview that he and Darrell were "inseparable" after they began playing music together.

At age 14, Abbott entered a guitar contest at the Agora Ballroom in Dallas, in which Dean Zelinsky, founder of Dean Guitars, was one of the judges. Abbott's mother accompanied him to the club because he was not old enough to enter on his own. He won the competition; Zelinsky recalled that "[Abbott] blew everyone away." Abbott won many other guitar contests in the area, and was eventually asked not to compete and instead judge the competitions so others could win.

== Career ==
=== Pantera ===
==== Early glam metal years ====
Pantera was formed in 1981. Vinnie was asked to join a band alongside his high school classmates Terry Glaze (guitar), Tommy Bradford (bass) and Donny Hart (vocals). Vinnie accepted the invitation, but on the condition that Darrell would also join the band. Glaze later recalled that they were unsure about this request, as Darrell "wasn't very good" and, two years their junior, "was a little skinny, scrawny dude", but they ultimately agreed. In 1989, Darrell made the same request when Dave Mustaine asked him to join Megadeth. As Mustaine had already recruited drummer Nick Menza and would not hire Vinnie, Darrell decided to stay with Pantera.

By 1982, Hart left the band and was replaced by Glaze on vocals, while Rex Brown took Bradford's place as bassist. Abbott originally shared lead guitar with Glaze, but soon took permanent status as lead guitarist. Glaze said: "[Abbott] just morphed over a six-month period. ... When he came out, he could play, like, 'Eruption' and 'Crazy Train'". Abbott adopted the stage name "Diamond Darrell", in reference to the Kiss song "Black Diamond".

Inspired by Kiss, Van Halen and Judas Priest, Pantera originally had a glam metal style and was image-conscious: the members wore spandex, makeup and hairspray when on stage. The band signed to Metal Magic Records, which was created by "Jerry Eld'n", an alias of Abbott's father Jerry. Jerry also served as the band's manager and producer during this time. Pantera released its first album, Metal Magic, in 1983, when Abbott was 16. A review in the November 1983 issue of Texas-based music magazine Buddy said Abbott's solos "tend to be asymmetrical in that the old theory of musical thought consisting of statements alternating with appropriate responses is ignored and replaced by authoritative delivery of the player's own concept of what should happen".

Pantera released Projects in the Jungle and I Am the Night in 1984 and 1985, respectively. Both albums followed on in the glam metal style, and were comparable to Shout at the Devil-era Mötley Crüe, although I Am the Night had a slightly heavier sound than previous releases. Around this time, the Abbott brothers began listening to bands such as Metallica and Slayer. Darrell was particularly taken by Metallica's Ride the Lightning (1984). Glaze was unhappy with the Abbott brothers' desire to move towards a heavier sound; he later said he "didn't want to go that heavy. I didn't like it as well if the guitar was the main thing, like the Metallica songs." This conflict, along with a contractual dispute, led to his departure in 1986.

Pantera tried several replacement vocalists unsuccessfully during 1986 before discovering Phil Anselmo late that year. This new lineup briefly signed with Gold Mountain Records, but released Power Metal (1988) on Metal Magic. Abbott said Gold Mountain "wanted to change our style and make us sound like Bon Jovi, which is not quite up our alley". Anselmo did not write any of the lyrics for Power Metal, and the band was still in the process of distancing themselves from glam metal, but the album evidenced a stylistic change. A retrospective AllMusic album review by Bradley Torreano said Abbott's "speedy riffs" were one of the "more charming elements" of the band's sound. Brown said in a 1988 interview that "Darrell has always been chunking those riffs out from the start. But now with Phil in the band we've got a chance to make those riffs fully happen instead of having some gay singer over the top of them!"

==== Development of groove metal ====
After the release of Power Metal, Pantera formed a relationship with Walter O'Brien and Andy Gould of Concrete Management. As Concrete managed other bands that were signed to Metal Blade Records, Gould contacted Brian Slagel of Metal Blade and asked him to sign Pantera. The $75,000 (equivalent to $184,826 in 2025) requested for the production of a new album was too much for Slagel, who rejected the offer. The Metal Blade rejection was one of many rejections for the band. Pantera eventually attained a major-label deal with Atco Records, after Atco's talent scout Mark Ross was impressed by one of the band's live performances.

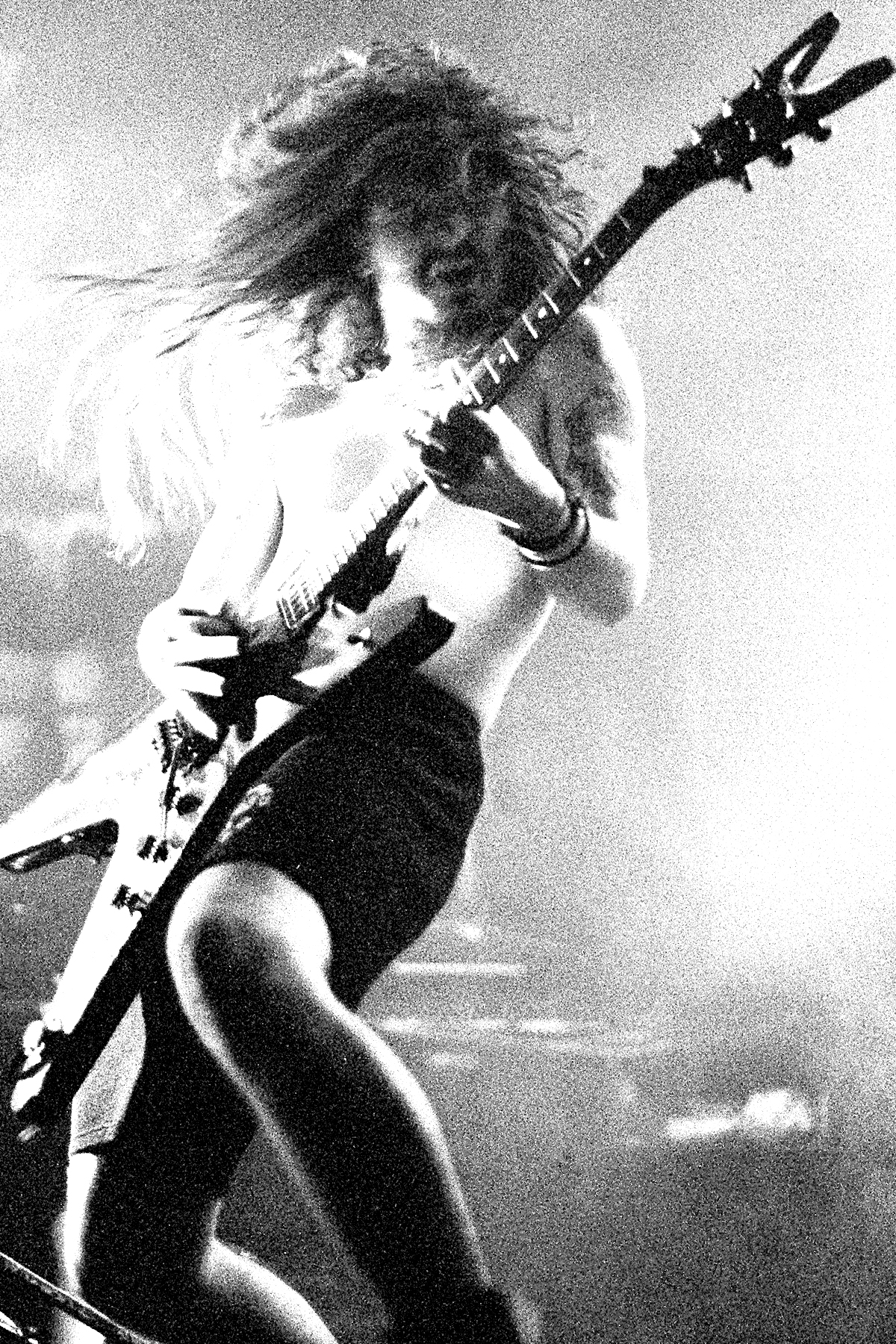
Abbott performing in 1990

Cowboys from Hell was released on July 24, 1990. The album was produced by Terry Date; Max Norman was the original choice for producer but he opted to produce Lynch Mob's Wicked Sensation instead. Date – who was hired to produce Cowboys from Hell on the strength of his work with Soundgarden, Metal Church and Overkill – also served as producer for Pantera's next three albums. Cowboys from Hell marked the development of what would become Pantera's familiar sound, to which Abbott's guitar playing was central. Self-described as "power groove", the album became a "blueprint-defining" work for groove metal, a sub-genre with the heaviness and intensity of thrash metal but played at a slower tempo. Southern rock elements were incorporated into the sound; Pantera's "groove" is commonly attributed to the Abbott brothers' fondness for ZZ Top. Cowboys from Hell was certified gold in 1993, and platinum in 1997. Pantera played close to 200 shows supporting Cowboys from Hell, as it toured for nearly two years. Aside from breaks to develop new material, the band spent most of the 1990s touring; Abbott gained a reputation as a wild figure on tour and a heavy drinker. Pantera recorded its second major-label album in the space of two months. Released on February 25, 1992, Vulgar Display of Power was a refinement of the groove metal sound. The band had sought to create a heavier album than Cowboys from Hell, as Anselmo fully embraced a hardcore-inspired shouted vocal delivery. Abbott composed most of the riffs and song structures, and further attempted to mesh his guitar with Brown's bass to create what Brown later described as "one giant tone". Vulgar Display of Power debuted at No. 44 on the Billboard 200, and it stayed on the chart for 79 weeks. In 2017, it was ranked at No. 10 on Rolling Stone's list of "The 100 Greatest Metal Albums of All Time", with Abbott's "serrated rhythms and squealing solos" highlighted.

Abbott had transformed his appearance by the time of Vulgar Display of Power's release to that which he would maintain for the rest of his life. He sported a dyed goatee, a razorblade pendant (in homage to Judas Priest's British Steel), cargo shorts and sleeveless shirts. Feeling that "Diamond Darrell" no longer suited his image or sound, Abbott adopted the stage name "Dimebag Darrell" instead. The name was originally coined by Anselmo. It was in reference to Abbott's refusal to accept more than a dime bag (slang for $10 worth) of cannabis at one time—even if offered for free—as he did not want to be caught with the drug on-hand.

All of Pantera's albums until 1994 were recorded at Pantego Sound, the studio owned by the Abbott brothers' father Jerry. It was conveniently located a short distance from the Abbotts' home. After Vulgar Display of Power was released, Jerry closed Pantego Sound and opened a new studio, Abtrax, in Nashville, Tennessee, as he hoped to fulfill his dream of becoming a country songwriter. Pantera's third major-label album, Far Beyond Driven, was recorded at Abtrax. Abbott said in a 1994 Guitar Player interview: "We were fuckin' flying [to Nashville] for three weeks at a time, writing songs and cutting them." This led to the members spending most of their downtime in each other's hotel rooms consuming drugs, rather than following their normal routines as they did when recording at Pantego Sound. They mixed the album at Dallas Sound Labs, which was close to their homes. Far Beyond Driven was released on March 15, 1994, on EastWest Records. It sold 186,000 copies in its first week to debut at No. 1 on the Billboard 200, and has since been described as the heaviest album ever to debut at No. 1.

Before the release, the band was expected to follow the lead of Metallica's eponymous album by taking a more commercially-friendly approach. Instead, Pantera wanted an even heavier work than Vulgar Display of Power. Abbott said in 1994: "We're into topping ourselves. Most bands come out with a heavy record, then it gets lighter and lighter. You're stuck listening to the first record, wishing and dreaming. That ain't what we're about."

==== Band tensions and separation ====
The lead single from Far Beyond Driven, "I'm Broken", was inspired by Anselmo's chronic back pain. To treat the pain during the tour supporting Far Beyond Driven, Anselmo began heavily consuming alcohol, painkillers and ultimately heroin. He would travel on his own tour bus and isolate himself from the other band members until twenty or thirty minutes before they were due to perform. Anselmo recalled in a 2014 interview that he would drink "an entire bottle of Wild Turkey every night before a show to numb the pain", and he often interrupted the performances by ranting on stage. Due to the tensions within the band, recordings for Pantera's next album, The Great Southern Trendkill, were held separately: Darrell, Vinnie and Brown recorded at Chasin' Jason Studio (a studio Darrell had constructed in a barn in his backyard) while Anselmo recorded the vocals at Trent Reznor's Nothing Studios in New Orleans. Abbott experimented with new guitars during the recording; he stated in 1996 that he wrote "Suicide Note Pt. 1" the first time he used a twelve-string guitar which Washburn Guitars had sent to him. The recording also saw Abbott draw on riffs he had composed much earlier: he wrote the outro-solo to "Floods" in the pre-Anselmo era, and he had previously recorded a 90-minute loop of it as a lullaby for his girlfriend.

On May 7, 1996, The Great Southern Trendkill was released. It peaked at No. 4 on the Billboard 200, staying on the chart for 13 weeks. It is considered to be Pantera's most extreme work, and features some of the band's lowest-tuned tracks. On July 13, Anselmo overdosed on heroin following the band's performance at the Dallas Starplex Amphitheatre and was clinically dead for "four to five minutes". He recovered quickly and performed at the band's next show in San Antonio two days afterward, but the incident created a lasting rift within the band. Anselmo had released NOLA, the debut album of one of his side projects Down, in 1995, and supported the album with a 13-show tour. The other Pantera members were originally unperturbed by Anselmo's side projects; Abbott explained at the time: "Phil's a musical guy and he likes to stay busy."

The touring for The Great Southern Trendkill widened the rift within the band, and the recording sessions for their next album, Reinventing the Steel, were troublesome. Vinnie said in an interview after the album's release: "It was like pulling teeth to get [Anselmo] down to the studio. He didn't like any of the material, and it was always just like this head-butting contest." Also during the recording, the Abbotts' mother, Carolyn, was diagnosed with lung cancer, and died six weeks later on September 12, 1999. This had a profound effect on the brothers, especially Darrell. Reinventing the Steel was released on March 21, 2000. Abbott said of it: "We still play lead guitar ... Bands hardly ever play lead guitar anymore. Dude, back in the seventies, if you couldn't play the guitar or sing, you were nobody. Now music is so easy—all you've got to do is tune your guitar to an open chord and jump around." Like The Great Southern Trendkill, Reinventing the Steel peaked at No. 4 on the Billboard 200.

Pantera were in Ireland, set to begin a European tour, on September 11, 2001. Due to the September 11 attacks, the tour was canceled and the members returned to Texas, where they agreed to take a short hiatus. In March 2002, Down released its second record, Down II: A Bustle in Your Hedgerow, which featured Brown on bass. Two months later, Superjoint Ritual—another of Anselmo's bands—released its debut album, Use Once and Destroy. The Abbotts believed that Pantera would regroup in 2003, after the tours supporting Down II and Use Once and Destroy were concluded. Instead, Anselmo recorded a second album with Superjoint Ritual, A Lethal Dose of American Hatred (2003). Also around this time, Darrell received a phone call from Brown, who indicated that he would not return to Pantera. The separation of Pantera was marked by the release of a greatest hits album, The Best of Pantera: Far Beyond the Great Southern Cowboys' Vulgar Hits!, on September 23, 2003.

=== Damageplan ===
Abbott was dejected by the separation of Pantera; he felt that all he had worked for had been "ripped out from under [him]". As continuing Pantera without Anselmo likely would have resulted in a lengthy and expensive legal battle regarding the ownership of the "Pantera" brand, the Abbott brothers decided to form a new band. They recorded demos at Darrell's backyard studio in February 2003. Patrick Lachman of Halford joined as vocalist and Bob Kakaha was recruited on bass, and the band signed with Elektra Records later in 2003. The name of the band originally was New Found Power, but they later decided on Damageplan. New Found Power instead served as the title of the group's debut album, which was released on February 10, 2004. It did not near the commercial success of Pantera's major-label releases: it sold 44,000 copies in its first week to debut at No. 38 on the Billboard 200 and had sold a modest 160,000 copies by December.

Damageplan spent most of 2004 on its Devastation Across the Nation tour. To rebuild a fanbase, the band toured nightclubs across the country. The members had planned to record a follow-up album, which did not materialize due to Abbott's murder at a show in Columbus, Ohio, on December 8, 2004.

=== Other projects ===
The Abbott brothers listened to country singer David Allan Coe while growing up as their parents were fans of the performer, and often used Coe's "Jack Daniels If You Please" as introductory music for Pantera shows. Darrell first met Coe in 1999, at one of his performances at Billy Bob's Texas. After the performance, Darrell waited in an autograph line to introduce himself and give Coe his phone number. They subsequently formed a friendship and Coe began spending time at Darrell's house, where the Abbott brothers and Coe played music in Darrell's backyard studio. They recruited Brown to play bass and the group sporadically recorded from 1999 to 2003. The resulting album, Rebel Meets Rebel, was released on May 2, 2006, on Vinnie's Big Vin Records. Megan Frye of AllMusic stated Rebel Meets Rebel is "groundbreaking in that it will please fans of both country and metal because the music is simultaneously both styles – it's never a fusion, they simply exist together".

In 1992, Abbott and the other Pantera members collaborated with Rob Halford on a track titled "Light Comes Out of Black", which was released on the Buffy the Vampire Slayer soundtrack. Abbott recorded the song "Caged in a Rage", on which he performed lead vocals and guitar, under his own name. It was included on the soundtrack to the 1996 film Supercop. Adam Greenberg of AllMusic said Abbott sounded "oddly similar to Rob Zombie" on "Caged in a Rage".

Abbott provided guest guitar solos for Anthrax on several occasions: "King Size" and "Riding Shotgun" from Stomp 442 (1995), "Inside Out" and "Born Again Idiot" from Volume 8: The Threat Is Real (1998), and "Strap It On" and "Cadillac Rock Box" from We've Come for You All (2003). Anthrax's Scott Ian referred to Abbott as the "sixth member" of the band due to his frequent appearances. Abbott also performed a guest solo on the title track of King Diamond's Voodoo (1998) and on "Eyes of the South" (2004) by Premenishen, a band that featured Abbott's cousins Heather Manly and April Adkisson on bass and guitar, respectively. After Darrell's death, Vinnie granted Nickelback permission to use outtakes of Darrell's solos from the Vulgar Display of Power and Far Beyond Driven recordings on its tribute track "Side of a Bullet". Darrell was a friend of Nickelback's Chad Kroeger and had provided a solo for Nickelback's cover of "Saturday Night's Alright for Fighting" on the soundtrack to the 2003 film Charlie's Angels: Full Throttle.

Darrell and Vinnie performed shows as Gasoline each New Year's Eve. Gasoline predominantly played covers of artists such as Ted Nugent and Pat Travers, but also composed original songs such as "Get Drunk Now" and "This Ain't a Beer Belly, It's a Gas Tank for My Love Machine". Gasoline once served as a support act for Drowning Pool. In 2006, "Country Western Transvestite Whore", a song that Abbott recorded with local Dallas musician Throbbin' Donnie Rodd, was released. It features Abbott on lead guitar and vocals. Other works by Abbott that have been posthumously released include "Dime's Blackout Society" (2010) and The Hitz (2017), a five-track EP.

== Murder ==
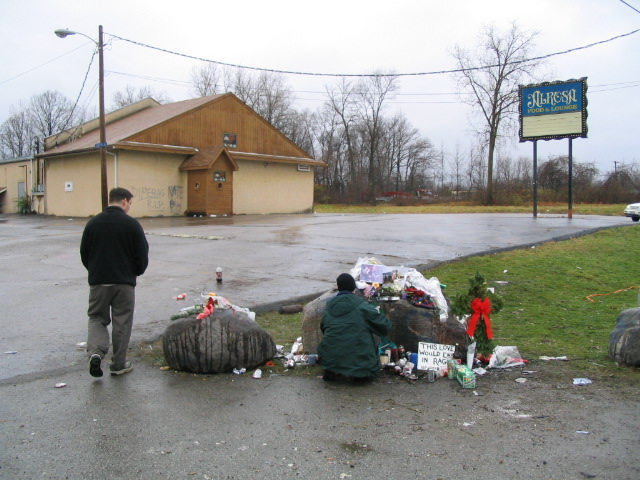
A fan mourns outside the now-defunct Alrosa Villa nightclub in Columbus, Ohio, where Abbott was murdered.

On December 8, 2004, Damageplan was performing at the Alrosa Villa nightclub in Columbus, Ohio. Nathan Gale, a deranged fan, rushed onto the stage as the band played the first song of its setlist and shot Abbott multiple times with a Beretta 92FS, a 9mm semi-automatic pistol, killing him instantly. The band's head of security, Jeffrey "Mayhem" Thompson, then tackled Gale, but was fatally shot in the ensuing struggle. A fan, Nathan Bray, was also killed as he attempted to aid Abbott and Thompson, as was Erin Halk, an employee of the venue who tried to disarm Gale while he was reloading. Three others were wounded before Columbus police officer James Niggemeyer entered the club and shot Gale once in the head with a 12-gauge Remington Model 870, killing him.

Abbott was pronounced dead at the scene, aged 38. Thousands of fans attended his public memorial, and the guest list included artists such as Eddie Van Halen, Zakk Wylde, Corey Taylor, Jerry Cantrell, and Dino Cazares. Abbott was buried alongside his mother Carolyn at the Moore Memorial Gardens cemetery in Arlington, Texas. Gene Simmons donated a Kiss Kasket for the burial, and Eddie Van Halen donated his original black-and-yellow-striped 1979 Charvel "Bumblebee" guitar, which was featured on the back cover of Van Halen II, to be included in the casket. A few weeks prior to his death, Abbott had met Van Halen and asked him for a replica of the Bumblebee. Van Halen said at the funeral: "Dime was an original and only an original deserves the original."

After Vinnie Paul's death in 2018, he was buried next to Carolyn and Darrell, also in a Kiss Kasket. In late 2020, a protective fence was installed around the Abbott burial ground in an effort to stop vandalism, as Darrell's grave had previously been scratched and defaced by people over the years. In a 2010 interview, Vinnie called the vandalism "a real disrespectful thing". The Alrosa Villa was demolished in 2021.

== Musical style ==
Originally a glam metal musician, Abbott distanced himself from the subgenre by the late 1980s, and was a driving force behind the development of groove metal in the 1990s.

=== Influences ===
Although his father was a country music producer and songwriter, Abbott's primary musical influences were heavy metal acts such as Black Sabbath, Iron Maiden, Judas Priest, Kiss and Van Halen. Ace Frehley of Kiss inspired him to play guitar. He was a member of the Kiss Army and had a portrait of Frehley tattooed on his chest in 1992. While at a photoshoot for the August 1993 issue of Guitar World along with Frehley, Abbott asked Frehley to sign an autograph near the tattoo. Abbott then had the signature tattooed.

No musician other than Frehley exerted more of an influence on Abbott than Eddie Van Halen. Abbott stated that his background mirrored Van Halen's as both he and Van Halen were younger brothers who first played drums before moving on to the guitar due to competition from their elder brothers on drums. Another influence was Randy Rhoads. Abbott said in 1994: "To me, Eddie Van Halen was heavy rock and roll, but Randy was heavy metal." He discovered double tracking leads through Rhoads. In numerous interviews, Abbott credited Tony Iommi of Black Sabbath for inspiring his guitar riffs. Abbott also said Def Leppard's original guitarist Pete Willis "was a great player. I was inspired by him because I was a small young dude and he was a small young dude, too—and he was out there kickin' ass. He made me want to get out there and play."

Abbott was a fan of the Southern rock band ZZ Top, and he was influenced by the band's guitarist and lead singer Billy Gibbons. He said in 1993: "I'm not a super blues player, but I was exposed to the Texas blues sound while I was growing up, and that definitely rubbed off on me." Abbott was also influenced by contemporary metal guitarists such as Kerry King of Slayer, James Hetfield of Metallica, and Zakk Wylde of Ozzy Osbourne and Black Label Society.

=== Technique ===
Abbott did not receive formal guitar lessons. He stated in a 1994 Guitar World interview that he once received "a guitar lesson off this cat. He wrote down some weird scale and tried to explain how it worked. After we finished he said, 'Now go on home, practice that scale, and show me how well you can play it next week.' So I took it home, played around with it for a few minutes and said, 'Fuck this, I just want to jam.' I respect people that can read tablature and all that shit, but I just don't even have the patience to read the newspaper."

Unlike many other heavy metal guitarists, Abbott made extensive use of the major third in his riffs and leads, which added dissonance to minor key tonalities. This was a Van Halen-inspired technique, as was his employment of symmetrical fingerings. Although Abbott had exceptional picking ability, he favored legato phrasing. His love of legato gave his playing a fluid quality, and his powerful left-hand technique enabled the implementation of the symmetrical patterns in his lead licks. Abbott avoided using scales and modes in traditional fashions, and often used passing tones between scalar tones to add tension. These chromatic licks made up much of his playing. Regardless of the note or chord, Abbott played with a "Texas style", meaning a variety of techniques such as sliding, bending, palm muting, and use of the whammy bar and effects pedal to produce an idiosyncratic sound.

One of the most distinctive features of Abbott's guitar playing was his use of harmonics to create a squealing sound, which he picked up from Gibbons. Unsatisfied with standard techniques, Abbott often used dyads in place of traditional power chords. This added texture to his riffs and, when played with distortion, created a tense sound. Abbott experimented with alternate tunings throughout his career. Early on, his guitar was tuned down more than a quarter step, similar to Van Halen I and Van Halen II tuning. On Cowboys From Hell (1990), he utilized drop D tuning, and beginning with Vulgar Display of Power (1992) he tuned his guitar down a whole step, which became his main tuning by the release of Reinventing the Steel (2000). He also used drop D down one step, down 1 ½ steps and drop D down 1 ½ steps tunings. Down 1 ½ steps tuning was prevalent on The Great Southern Trendkill (1996) and was Abbott's main tuning on New Found Power (2004).

Three of Abbott's solos were ranked in Guitar World's "100 Greatest Guitar Solos of All Time": "Walk" at No. 57; "Cemetery Gates" at No. 35; and "Floods" at No. 19. Despite his virtuosity, Abbott said that while "jerking off all over the neck", as he described, was suited to competing in guitar contests, it often did not benefit a song's composition. "Slaughtered" from Far Beyond Driven originally had a slow, melodic solo, but Abbott removed it after noting that it disrupted the song's momentum.

== Equipment ==
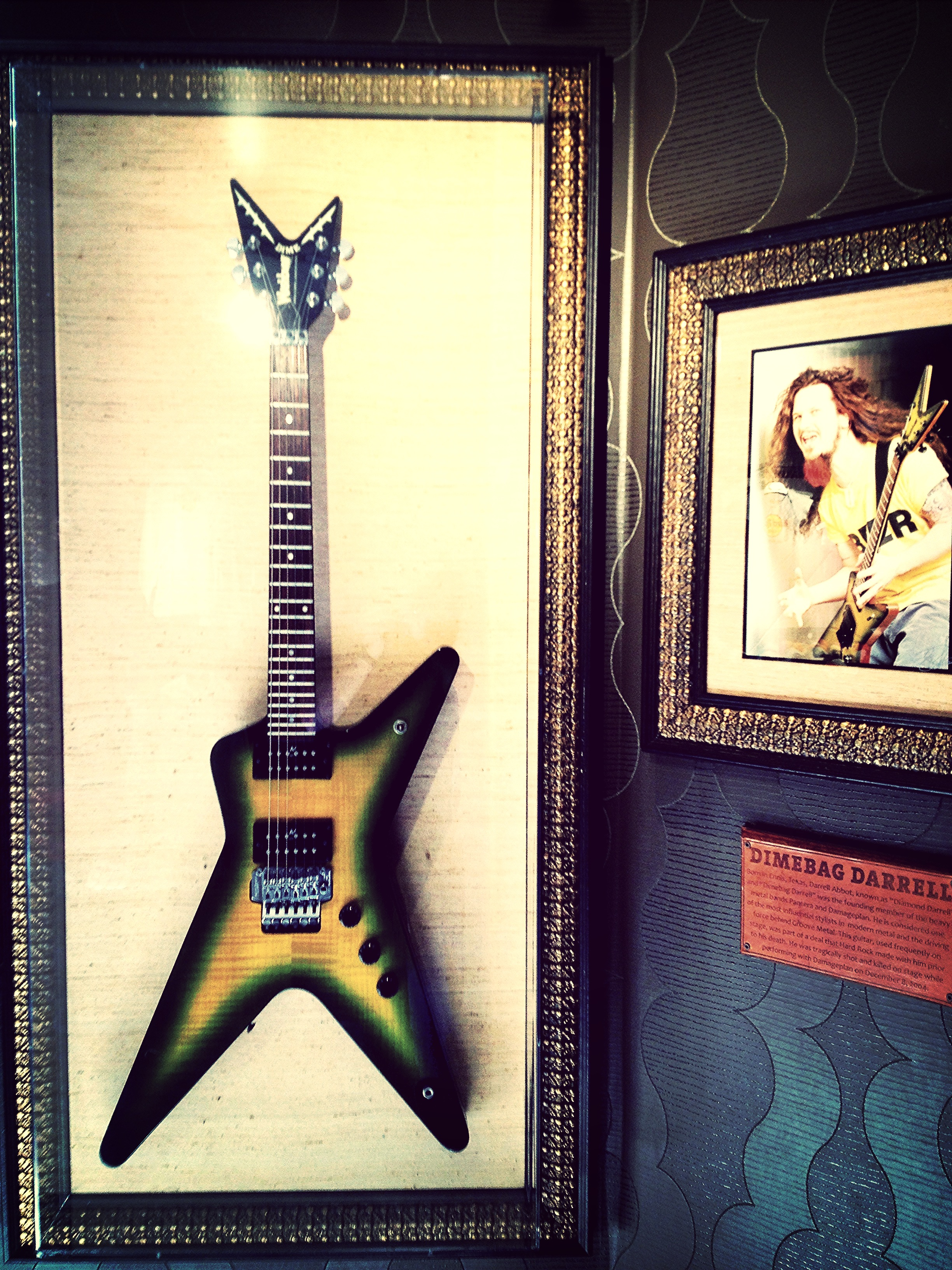
Abbott's Washburn Dime 333, a signature guitar built in the style of a Dean ML

In 1982, Abbott won a maroon Dean ML at a guitar contest in Dallas. Unbeknownst to Abbott, his father had bought him a sunburst ML shortly before the contest. Nearing driving age and seeking to purchase a Pontiac Firebird, Abbott attempted to sell the maroon ML to his friend Buddy Blaze, a luthier and musician. Blaze felt that a guitar won as a prize should stay with its owner and refused to buy it. Abbott instead sold the guitar to one of Blaze's bandmates. Blaze negotiated with his bandmate, and took possession of the ML in exchange for a Kramer Pacer. Blaze then replaced the standard ML hardware: he installed a custom Floyd Rose vibrato bridge and Bill Lawrence L-500XL pickups, and moved the stock DiMarzio pickup to the neck. He also repainted the guitar, from its original maroon to blue-and-black with a lightning bolt finish. Blaze returned the ML to Abbott in 1987, who was initially unaware that it was the same guitar he won as a prize. It subsequently became Abbott's signature guitar and was later dubbed the "Dean from Hell".

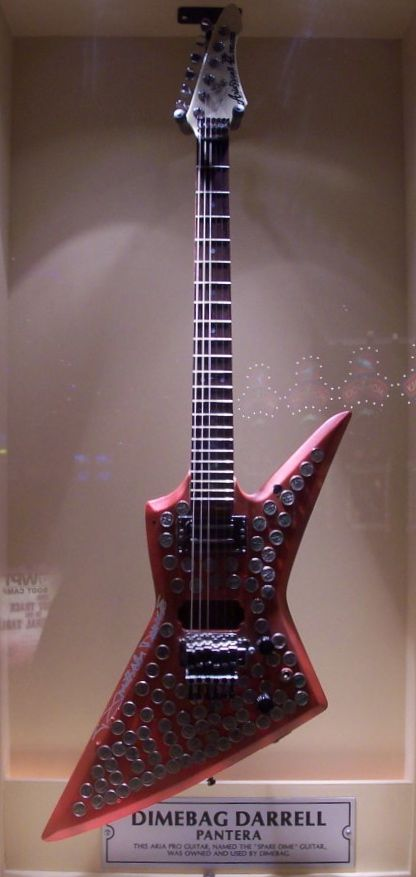
An Aria Pro guitar, nicknamed "The Spare Dime", on display at the Hard Rock Casino in Florida

After the release of Cowboys from Hell, Abbott signed an endorsement deal with Dean Guitars. Dean went out of business in 1994 and Abbott then signed a ten-year contract with Washburn Guitars. With Washburn, he played various signature guitars modeled after the ML, such as the Dime 333, Culprit and Stealth. When his contract with Washburn expired in 2004, he became the main endorsee of the re-opened Dean. Abbott's murder came shortly before the Dean contract was set to begin. Abbott had designed the Dean Razorback and Razorback V in the months prior to his death. Dean also posthumously released replicas of the Dean from Hell.

Abbott was praised for his instrumental tone and was included in Guitar Player's list of "The 50 Greatest Tones of All Time". Abbott used solid-state Randall amplifiers for most of his career; he remarked in the liner notes for Cowboys from Hell: "Gotta have that Randall Crunch!" He had won his first Randall amplifier in a guitar contest; he said in a 1993 interview it "was a little nasty sounding, a little gritty, but I liked it. I knew that with time I could make it my own sound, and it came around." Abbott released a signature amplifier, the Randall Warhead, in 1999. The goal was to replicate the sound of his own rig: a Randall RG-100 head, Furman PQ-3 parametric equalizer, MXR six-band graphic equalizer and MXR 126 flanger. He set his Furman EQ to boost the highs and lows while scooping the mids, and he used both the Furman EQ and MXR EQ to increase the gain to the Randall's front end. Abbott also used a Digitech whammy pedal, a Korg DT-7 chromatic tuner and a Rocktron Hush IIC noise gate. The noise gate allowed him to control the feedback associated with high levels of gain, and to create the distinctive holes of silence in his playing.

When Abbott's endorsement deal with Washburn ended, his deal with Randall also ended, as Randall and Washburn both were subsidiaries of the U.S. Music Corporation. Abbott subsequently formed a partnership with Krank Amplifiers, a relatively small supplier. He used the Krank Revolution, a tube amplifier. Abbott also invested in the company and designed an amplifier named the Krankenstein; he approved the final revision of the Krankenstein just days before his murder. Abbott helped design many other products. With Dunlop Manufacturing, he designed the Dimebag Cry Baby from Hell, a wah-wah pedal, and the Dime Distortion, a distortion pedal. He also designed a signature pickup with Seymour Duncan titled the Dimebucker, which was based on the Bill Lawrence pickups that he used in most of his guitars. Dean Zelinsky of Dean said in 2010 that Abbott's death was a "bigger loss than we'll ever know. ... I'm very proud of the work I did with him, but who knows what he would have accomplished if he was still with us."

== Personal life ==
Abbott grew up in the same neighborhood as his long-time partner Rita Haney, whom he first met at the age of eight. They began dating in 1984. The couple never married. Haney said in a 2006 interview: "We didn't believe in the marriage thing. ... Why have someone you don't know tell you it's OK to be with someone you do know? We didn't need the middleman! We had a one-on-one with the man upstairs ourselves." In 1995, Abbott bought a house with Haney in Dalworthington Gardens, Texas, a short distance from his hometown Arlington. Abbott kept a pet goat on the residence, and dyed its goatee like his own. He was remembered by his neighbors as approachable. One neighbor said he "was a hick with an attitude, and I say that respectfully. We'd talk conservative politics. He was a big, big supporter of George Bush."

Darrell and Vinnie opened the Clubhouse, an all-nude strip club in north-west Dallas, in 1996. Vinnie's original idea was a rock-and-roll-themed golf course, with "a strip club at the nineteenth hole", but the construction of a golf course was prohibitively expensive. Under the Abbott brothers' ownership, the Clubhouse was patronized by many artists who toured in the area, such as Black Sabbath, Kiss and Metallica, as well as NASCAR drivers, professional golfers, and members of the Dallas Cowboys and the Dallas Stars (whose fight song, "Puck Off", was written and produced by Pantera). After the Dallas Stars won the 1999 Stanley Cup Finals, the Abbott brothers hosted a party for the team at Vinnie's house. Vinnie later stated that the Stanley Cup was dented during the party after Guy Carbonneau attempted to throw it out of a window into the swimming pool, but it missed the pool and hit the edge. The brothers also performed on a float during the celebration of the Stars' victory.

== Legacy ==
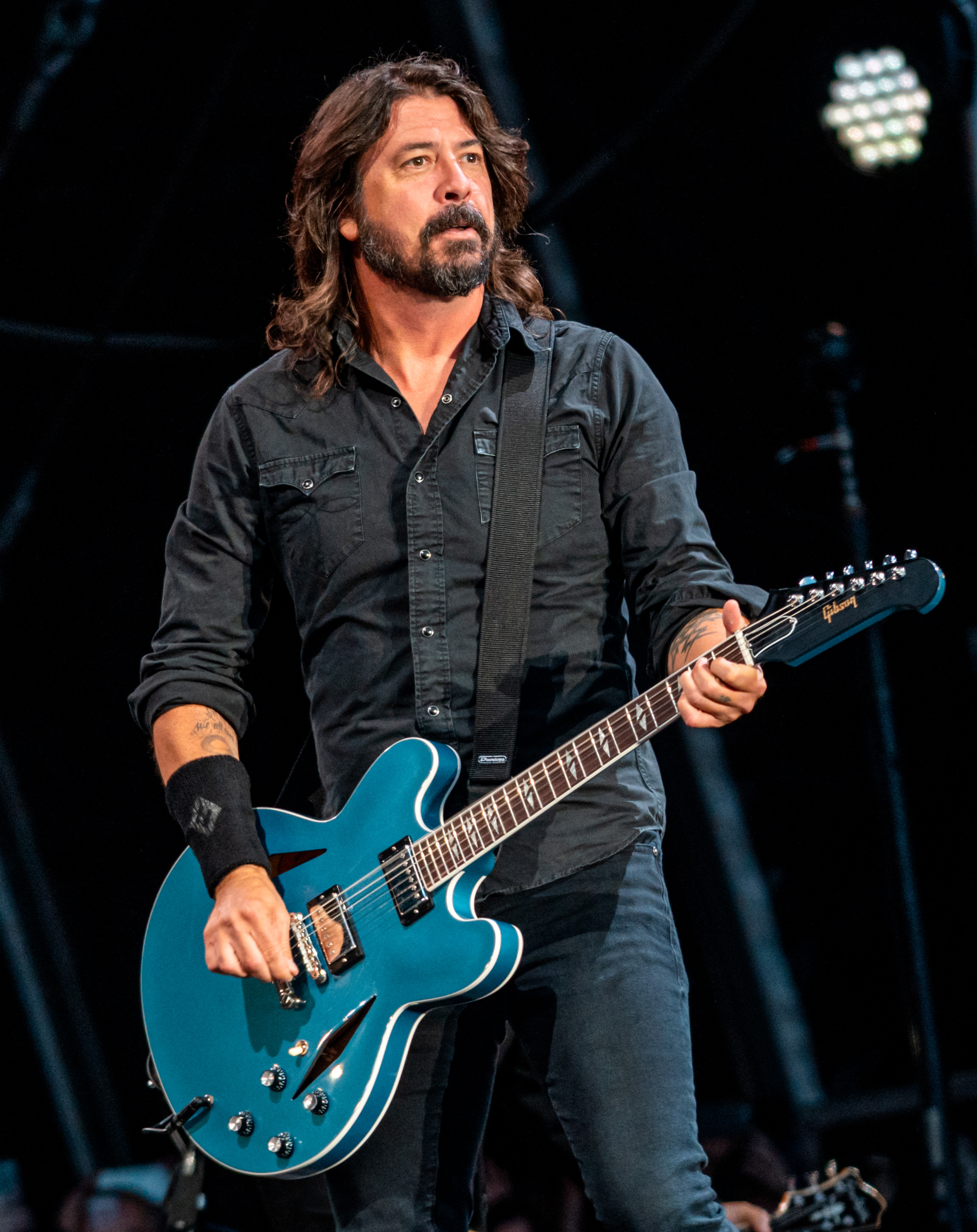
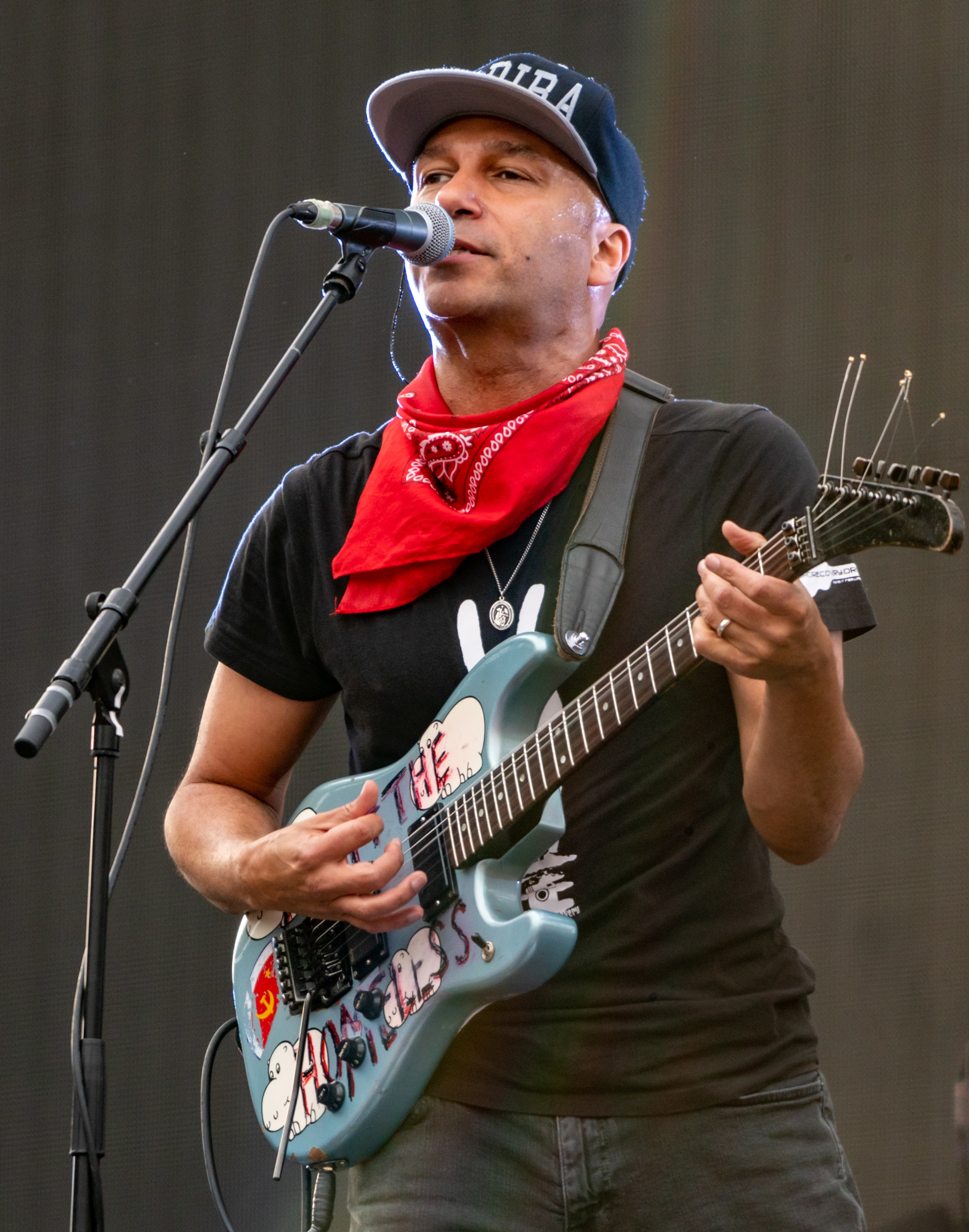
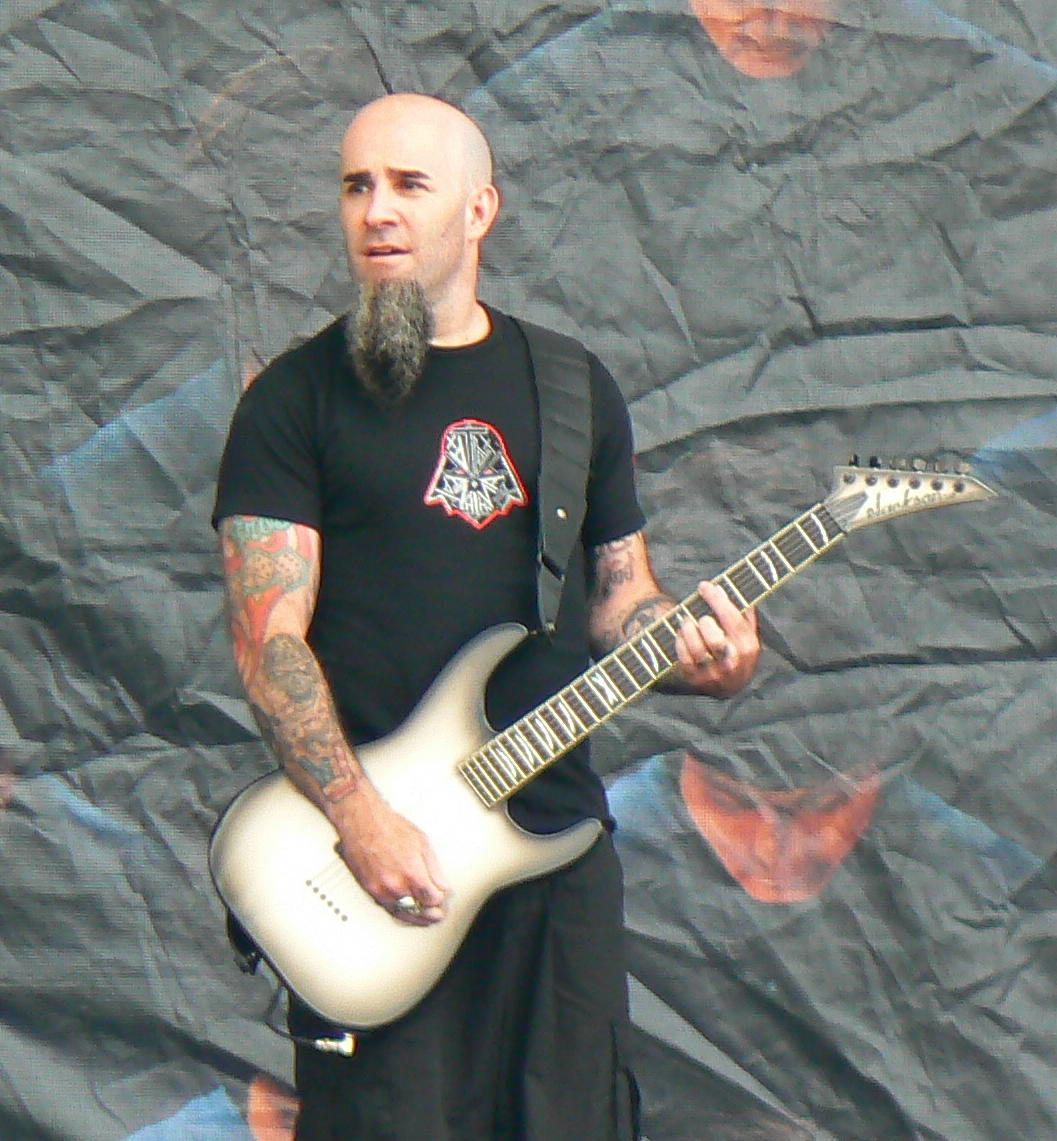
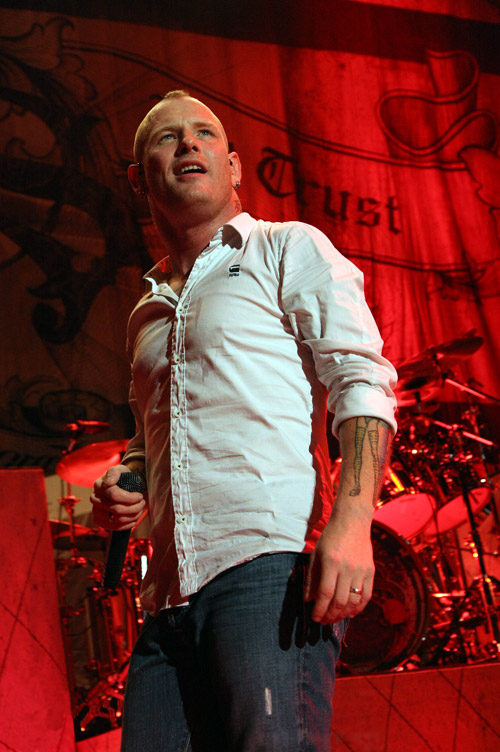
The annual tribute concert Dimebash has had numerous high-profile performers over the years, including Dave Grohl of Foo Fighters, Tom Morello of Rage Against the Machine, Scott Ian of Anthrax, and Corey Taylor of Slipknot.

On May 17, 2007, Abbott was posthumously inducted into Hollywood's RockWalk. Ace Frehley was among the attendees at the induction ceremony, where he spoke in honor of Abbott. Frehley also dedicated his 2009 album Anomaly to Abbott, as well as former Kiss drummer Eric Carr. A concert in memory of Abbott titled Dimebash has been held annually since 2010. All of the concert's proceeds go towards the Ronnie James Dio Stand Up and Shout Cancer Fund. Performers at Dimebash events have included artists such as Dave Grohl, Kerry King, Robb Flynn, Tom Morello, and Serj Tankian.

Rolling Stone ranked Abbott at No. 92 on its list of "The 100 Greatest Guitarists of All Time" in 2011, and described him as "one of modern metal's key figures". Geezer Butler of Black Sabbath said Abbott was "one of the greatest musicians to grace our world". In 2018, Abbott ranked at No. 19 on Louder's list of "The 50 Greatest Guitarists of All Time". Sebastian Bach of Skid Row commented that Abbott "reinvented heavy metal guitar". Jamie Humphries of Premier Guitar remarked in 2014: "If there were ever a band and guitarist to credit for reinventing post-Metallica metal, it would have to be Pantera and the late Dimebag Darrell."

Abbott also ranked at No. 9 in a 2012 Guitar World readers' poll of "The 100 Greatest Guitarists of All Time", and was named the "Greatest Metal Guitarist" by Loudwire in 2013 after winning a reader-voted tournament bracket. Jonathan Davis of Korn said in a 2014 interview with Loudwire that Abbott is "one of the greatest guitar players ever. I mean if there was no Dimebag Darrell, there would be no Korn." Slash stated that Abbott "had a great tone and a great original style ... He was one of the best new guitar players that came out over a long period of time." Max Cavalera described Abbott as "very talented, an amazing musician and a humble and cool guy – not a rock star asshole".

In 2015, Abbott was ranked as the most influential metal guitarist of the past 25 years by VH1. Doc Coyle of God Forbid stated: "[Abbott's] sparse, low-end, bluesy chug was the blueprint for post-thrash, nu-metal, and metalcore in the subsequent years." Also in 2015, Abbott placed at No. 5 on Gibson's list of "The Top 10 Metal Guitarists of All Time". Anne Erickson said Abbott "proved metal guitar could shred wildly, but still groove. ... He'll always be remembered as one of the most significant engineers of modern metal." In a 2017 interview by Ernie Ball String Theory, Avenged Sevenfold guitarists Synyster Gates and Zacky Vengeance praised Abbott's guitar playing and writing, stating how he was a major influence on the pair, Gates in particular, which he has stated in numerous other interviews.

In 2025 Abbott was posthumously inducted into The Metal Hall of Fame.

== Discography ==
Pantera

- Metal Magic (1983)
- Projects in the Jungle (1984)
- I Am the Night (1985)
- Power Metal (1988)
- Cowboys from Hell (1990)
- Vulgar Display of Power (1992)
- Far Beyond Driven (1994)
- The Great Southern Trendkill (1996)
- Reinventing the Steel (2000)

Damageplan

- New Found Power (2004)

Rebel Meets Rebel

- Rebel Meets Rebel (2006) (recorded in 2000)
