= Columbus nightclub shooting =

2004 mass shooting in Columbus, Ohio, United States

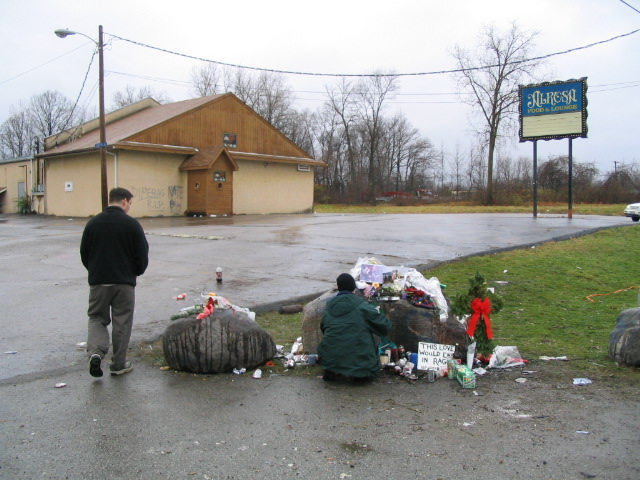
- A fan outside the Alrosa Villa pays tribute to Dimebag Darrell, the main target of the shooting
- Location: 40.0686°N 82.9991°W; 5055 Sinclair Road, Columbus, Ohio, U.S.
- Date: December 8, 2004; 21 years ago 10:20 – 10:23 p.m. (EST; UTC−05:00)
- Target: Dimebag Darrell
- Attack type: Mass shooting
- Weapons: Perpetrator: 9mm Beretta 92FS semi-automatic pistol; Defender: 12-gauge Remington Model 870 pump action shotgun (Niggemeyer)
- Deaths: 5 (including the perpetrator)
- Injuries: 3
- Perpetrator: Nathan Gale
- Defenders: Jeffrey "Mayhem" Thompson; Erin "Stoney" Halk; Travis Burnett; John "Kat" Brooks; James Niggemeyer
- Motive: Unknown

On December 8, 2004, four people were killed and three others wounded in a mass shooting at the Alrosa Villa nightclub in Columbus, Ohio, United States. The main target of the attack was "Dimebag" Darrell Abbott, who was on stage performing with his band Damageplan at the time of the shooting. During the opening song, 25-year-old Nathan Gale rushed the stage and fired his gun several times, killing Abbott. Three minutes after opening fire, Gale took a hostage in a negotiation attempt, but was shot in the forehead with a shotgun by responding officer James Niggemeyer.

Abbott sustained multiple gunshot wounds to the head and was pronounced dead at the scene. The other fatalities were Jeffrey "Mayhem" Thompson, Damageplan's head of security, who tackled Gale; Erin Halk, an Alrosa employee, who tried to restrain Gale; and Damageplan fan Nathan Bray, who had jumped onto the stage to aid Abbott and Thompson. Damageplan's tour manager Chris Paluska and drum technician John Brooks suffered nonfatal gunshot wounds and were taken to Riverside Methodist Hospital, while road crew member Travis Burnett was treated at the scene.

The motive for the shooting is still unknown. Gale, a former member of the United States Marine Corps, had told his mother and employer that he had been discharged due to paranoid schizophrenia, and many of his friends observed erratic behavior from Gale in the months leading up to the shooting. Some news outlets claimed that Gale was angry with Abbott for the dissolution of his previous band Pantera, while others believed that Gale was operating under the delusion that Pantera had plagiarized his lyrics and had attempted to steal his identity.

A number of heavy metal artists released tributes to Abbott after his death, while others pushed for increased security at concerts to prevent another such incident. Niggemeyer was valorized for his action and later retired from the police department in 2011 with post-traumatic stress disorder. Abbott's brother and Pantera drummer Vinnie Paul resented singer Phil Anselmo for his perceived role in influencing the shooter and remained distant from the other members of the band until his death in 2018.

== Background ==
Guitarist Darrell Abbott, better known by his stage name of "Dimebag Darrell", founded the American heavy metal band Pantera in 1981 with his brother Vincent Abbott, better known as Vinnie Paul. After the release of their album Reinventing the Steel in 2000, tensions arose between the Abbott brothers and lead singer Phil Anselmo, and although Pantera never officially disbanded, by 2003, the band members had moved on to other projects. The Abbott brothers recruited Patrick Lachman, former guitarist for Halford, to form the heavy metal band Damageplan. Damageplan released its first album, New Found Power, in February 2004, and spent most of the year on tour to promote the title.

On April 4, 2004, a Pantera fan named Nathan Gale interrupted a Damageplan performance at Bogart's nightclub in Cincinnati, Ohio, jumping onto the stage and causing US$1,800 of damage to lighting and other stage equipment during an ensuing police struggle. While officers responding to a 911 call about the incident noted Gale's actions as criminal endangerment and destruction of property, Damageplan elected not to press charges, as the members did not want to return to Cincinnati for court proceedings. The band was unfazed by the incident. An attendee later stated that after Gale had been removed from the venue, Lachman had joked, "I'd like to introduce you to the fifth member of the [expletive] band."

== Shooting ==
On Wednesday, December 8, 2004, Damageplan was headlining a concert at the Alrosa Villa nightclub in Columbus, Ohio. The venue had a capacity of 600 and had sold 250 tickets for the evening's show. Club manager Rick Cautela and other concertgoers noticed Gale loitering in the parking lot during the opening acts, Volume Dealer and 12 Gauge and asked why he was outside, to which he responded, "I don't want to see no shitty local bands [...] I'm gonna wait for Damageplan." By the time that Damageplan took the stage at 10:15 pm EST, the crowd had grown to about 400. Gale entered the premises by scaling a 6-foot (1.8 m) wooden fence on the north side of the venue and entering through a patio door.

At 10:20 pm, partway into the opening song of Damageplan's set, (Note: Sources differ as to whether the band was playing "New Found Power" or "Breathing New Life".) Gale, dressed in a Columbus Blue Jackets hockey jersey and a hooded sweatshirt, rushed onto the stage and drew his Beretta 92FS 9 mm semiautomatic pistol. He moved directly towards Abbott and shot him four times at point-blank range: in the right cheek, the left ear, the back of the head, and the right hand. Joe Dameron, the bassist for Volume Dealer, said that Gale shouted something, but did not know what. Some attendees did not realize that a shooting had taken place, with security guard Ryan Melchiore stating, "people were pumping their fists, thinking it was a hoax."

After shooting Abbott, Gale began firing on the other attendees, beginning with tour manager Chris Paluska, (Note: Paluska would later attest that he had been shot before Abbott.) who was shot once in the chest before Damageplan security chief Jeffrey "Mayhem" Thompson tackled Gale from behind. Thompson was fatally shot in the chest, back, and upper thigh in the ensuing struggle. Nathan Bray, a Damageplan fan, leapt onto the stage and was fatally shot in the chest while attempting to resuscitate Abbott and Thompson. Erin "Stoney" Halk, an Alrosa Villa employee and former Marine, who had either assisted Thompson or had charged Gale while he was reloading, was mortally wounded by six shots, four in the chest, one in the hand, and one in the leg.

Travis Burnett, a member of Volume Dealer's road crew, attempted to disarm Gale and was grazed by a bullet on his left forearm. Burnett fled the scene when subsequent gunshots were aimed at his head. Drum technician John "Kat" Brooks attempted to subdue Gale. He was shot twice in the leg and was taken as a hostage. Responding within three minutes to a 911 dispatch call, Officer James Niggemeyer of the Columbus Division of Police entered the club through a backstage door and shot Gale once in the face with a 12-gauge Remington Model 870 shotgun, killing him instantly. At the time of his death, Gale had a half-full magazine in his Beretta and another 30 rounds of ammunition on his person. He had fired 15 rounds during the attack.

Fans removed Abbott from the stage and attempted cardiopulmonary resuscitation until paramedics arrived at the scene, where Abbott was pronounced dead. He was 38 years old. Thompson, 40, and Halk, 29, were also pronounced dead at the scene, while Bray, 23, was transported to the Riverside Methodist Hospital and was declared dead at 11:10 pm. Paluska and Brooks were also transported to Riverside; they ultimately survived and recovered from their injuries. Burnett received treatment at the scene and declined transport to the hospital.

== Perpetrator ==
Nathan Miles Gale (September 11, 1979 – December 8, 2004) was born in Chicago, Illinois, as the youngest of three sons to Gerald and Mary Gale. He spent the first few years of his life in the Chicago suburb of Lansing until his parents divorced; he then moved with his mother to Marysville, Ohio, while his two older brothers stayed behind with their father. Gale initially attended Benjamin Logan High School, where he briefly wrestled, but transferred to Marysville High partway through his junior year. He enrolled in a vocational program at the Ohio Hi-Point Career Center, where he studied construction and electrical work, and graduated in 1998.

Gale lived with his mother after graduation, working a variety of minimum wage jobs and developing a problem with substance abuse. He often complained of being watched, which his mother attributed to his drug use. When a violent confrontation with his mother led to police intervention, Gale was thrown out of the house and became homeless. He supported himself through panhandling and theft until he agreed to enter a drug rehabilitation program, after which his mother allowed him to return. Gale's encounters with law enforcement at this time were minor - some trespassing charges from skateboarding, as well as one instance where he was accused of stealing from work.

In February 2002, inspired by the September 11 attacks, Gale enlisted in the United States Marine Corps (USMC). Proud of his military service, Gale's mother purchased the Beretta pistol as a Christmas present after he completed basic training. Gale was stationed at Camp Lejeune in North Carolina with the 2nd Marine Division until he was discharged in November 2003, less than halfway through the typical four-year enlistment period. A USMC spokeswoman declined to explain the reason behind Gale's military discharge.

Gale told his mother that he had been discharged due to being diagnosed with paranoid schizophrenia. Although he had returned with medication, he declined additional treatment after returning home. The Department of Veteran Affairs found Gale a job as a mechanic, and he informed his employer, Rich Cencula, of his condition. An autopsy performed by the Franklin County coroner's office found no trace of drugs in Gale's system, prescription or otherwise.

Standing 6 ft 3 in (1.91 m) and weighing over 250 lb (113 kg), Gale decided to take up boxing and football after his military discharge. He joined the Lima Thunder, a semi-professional football team in northwest Ohio, as an offensive lineman, and would listen to Pantera before games. Gale, a lifelong fan of heavy metal, became obsessed with Pantera while he was in high school, and remained fixated on the band even after their 2003 separation. Gale's former friend Dave Johnson told reporters that Gale had shown up at a mutual friend's house with Pantera lyrics that he had claimed were his own, asserting that Pantera had plagiarized the lyrics and were attempting to steal his identity.

Many of Gale's friends began to distance themselves from him as his behavior became increasingly erratic; once, he told his former friend Mark Break that God was asking him to kill Marilyn Manson. Others noted that he would talk and laugh to himself, would pretend to hold an imaginary dog, and that he would bother patrons at the tattoo parlor across the street from his apartment, staring at clients and engaging them in conversations about heavy metal music. Gale's neighbors remembered him as quiet and aloof. He had been stopped multiple times for traffic citations, and had been charged with criminal trespassing for both skateboarding and sleeping outside.

At the time of the shooting, Gale lived alone in an apartment above a vacant storefront. After the shooting, police officers found two handwritten notes inside the apartment. One read, "You'll see come alive. I'll take your life and make it mine. This is my life I'm gone. Git me." The other read, "You'll see the sky fall. I'll makes Pig fly. Come on and give me some. Come on give me some. Do it and Die, Do it and Die."

== Aftermath ==
After the shooting, Gale was speculated to have been motivated by Pantera's disbandment, with initial reports claiming that he had shouted, "You broke up Pantera" or, "This is for breaking up Pantera" before opening fire, statements never corroborated by witnesses. Others cited a Metal Hammer interview with Phil Anselmo that had been published shortly before the shooting, where Anselmo said that Abbott "deserves to be beaten severely". Investigators found no evidence that Gale had been motivated either by Pantera's split or by the dispute between Abbott and Anselmo, and were unable to find evidence that Gale had read the interview. The fact that the shooting occurred exactly 24 years after the murder of John Lennon was dismissed as coincidental.

After listening to the recording of the Metal Hammer interview, Vinnie Paul concluded that Anselmo had not been joking about the "beaten severely" comment, and from that point he declined to speak with Anselmo or Pantera bassist Rex Brown. Although plans for a Pantera reunion tour had been discussed, with Zakk Wylde filling in for Abbott, the rift with Vinnie remained until his death in 2018. The band eventually reunited in 2022 for a series of tours, with Wylde and Charlie Benante filling in for Abbott and Paul, respectively.

Niggemeyer, the on-duty police officer who had engaged in deadly force, was brought before a grand jury as standard procedure to determine if any wrongdoing had occurred. At no point did prosecutor Ron O'Brien expect Niggemeyer to be charged, and he was cleared of wrongdoing on May 23, 2005. Niggemeyer received a number of awards for his actions during the shooting; he was a finalist for a bravery award given by America's Most Wanted, was given the Distinguished Law Enforcement Valor Award from Ohio attorney general Jim Petro, and was named the Law Enforcement Officer of the Year in 2005 by the National Rifle Association. Gale's mother referred to Niggemeyer as a "hero," and told reporters, "I give that man credit. You'll never know how many lives he saved." Niggemeyer remained a first responder for three years before becoming a robbery detective on the advice of his doctors, who had diagnosed him with post-traumatic stress disorder and a severe anxiety disorder. He left the department in 2011 to take a different job with the city, and as of 2014, remained friends with both Cautela and with Halk's brother Andy.

The shooting raised concerns within the music community over concert security and the prevalence of fans leaping onto the stage. Anthrax guitarist Scott Ian said that his view of stage rushers changed after Abbott's murder, and that, "I don't give a fuck how much fun you're having. Stay the fuck off the stage." Immediately after the shooting, many concert venues tightened their security standards by hiring off-duty police officers as guards, checking attendees' pockets and bags more thoroughly, and in some cases studying setlists to anticipate when fans may become troublesome. By 2014, however, Cannibal Corpse drummer Paul Mazurkiewicz and We Are Harlot guitarist Jeff George noted that many venues had relaxed their security protocols due to the associated costs. When Christina Grimmie was fatally shot by an obsessed fan in Florida during a 2016 meet-and-greet event outside the Plaza Live, a venue without metal detectors, the Pantera Facebook account called on venues and promoters to improve their security to protect artists.

The Alrosa Villa nightclub was listed for sale in late 2019, following the death of its founders, Al and Rosa Cautela. Their children continued operating the venue until 2020, when the COVID-19 pandemic forced music venues and bars to close indefinitely. In June 2021, the city of Columbus announced that the venue would be demolished to make way for a housing project. The Alrosa Villa was demolished in December 2021.

== Tributes ==
Abbott was a popular and influential figure in the heavy metal community, and his death created a mass outpouring of grief among other bands and artists of the time. One of the first artists to create a musical tribute to Abbott was Black Label Society, whose music video for "In This River" depicts Wylde and Abbott as children attempting to swim across a river; while Wylde survives, Abbott does not. Type O Negative, who were close friends with Abbott, waited until 2007 to release the track "Halloween in Heaven" from the album Dead Again. Frontman Peter Steele told MTV, "I didn't want to exploit [Abbott's] name because it was so soon after his death." Vinnie Paul donated an unreleased 24-second guitar solo to Nickelback that they incorporated into the 2005 track "Side of a Bullet", which describes the shooting from the point of view of the killer. Other tribute songs include "Dimes in Heaven" by Brides of Destruction and "Dimebag" by Cross Canadian Ragweed, while the 2005 albums Ten Thousand Fists by Disturbed, Lifesblood for the Downtrodden by Crowbar, and Start a War by Static-X were all dedicated to Abbott's memory.

Although he never met Abbott, M. Shadows of Avenged Sevenfold was affected by the death of one of his two "greatest guitar heroes", the other being Slash, and the track "Betrayed" on City of Evil, written from multiple points of view, was Shadows's "way of dealing with the whole thing after it happened". Machine Head, meanwhile, was inspired to write "Aesthetics of Hate" after frontman Robb Flynn read an article praising Gale for the murder of "a semi-human barbarian". The song was nominated for Best Metal Performance at the 50th Grammy Awards.

== See also ==
- Murder of Christina Grimmie – American singer and YouTuber (1994–2016)
- Murder of John Lennon – 1980 murder in New York City, US
- Murder of Selena – 1995 murder in Corpus Christi, Texas, US
- Ricardo López (attempted to murder Björk)
- List of murdered musicians
