= The Great Southern Trendkill =

Studio album by Pantera
- Released: May 7, 1996
- Recorded: October 1995 – February 1996
- Studios: Chasin' Jason Studios in Dalworthington Gardens, Texas, U.S.; Nothing Studios in New Orleans, Louisiana, U.S.
- Genre: Groove metal
- Length: 53:05
- Labels: Elektra; East West
- Producers: Terry Date; Vinnie Paul

Pantera chronology
Far Beyond Driven (1994)	The Great Southern Trendkill (1996)	The Singles 1991–1996 (1996)

Pantera studio album chronology
Far Beyond Driven (1994)	The Great Southern Trendkill (1996)	Reinventing the Steel (2000)

Singles from The Great Southern Trendkill
- 1. "Drag the Waters" Released: 1996

The Great Southern Trendkill is the eighth studio album by American groove metal band Pantera, released on May 7, 1996, through Elektra Records and East West Records. During the album's production, Phil Anselmo recorded the vocals alone at Trent Reznor's Nothing Studios in New Orleans, while Dimebag Darrell, Rex Brown, and Vinnie Paul recorded the music at Chasin Jason Studios in Dalworthington Gardens. This would be Pantera's last studio album to be produced by Terry Date, who had worked with the band since Cowboys from Hell (1990).

The album came at a time of heightened tension and strife within the band, especially as Anselmo's heroin addiction threatened to tear the band apart. Upon release, the album peaked at No. 4 on the Billboard 200, and charted in numerous other countries as well, later being certified platinum in the United States. The album, while receiving positive reviews, was more polarizing than the band's previous albums.

== Background ==
Pantera's previous three albums, Cowboys from Hell, Vulgar Display of Power, and Far Beyond Driven, all received widespread acclaim and helped propel the band to the top of the metal world. However, by this point the band was beginning to experience tension between its members. According to the Abbott brothers, Anselmo began behaving strangely and distanced himself from the band after the release of Driven, which the rest of the band believed was due to fame getting to Anselmo. However, Anselmo cited back pain from years of intense performances as the reason for his erratic behavior. Anselmo attempted to alleviate his pain through alcohol, but this, as he admitted, was affecting his performances and "putting some worry into the band." Doctors predicted that with surgery, Anselmo's back problem could be corrected, but with a long recovery time. Unwilling to spend so long away from the band, Anselmo refused, and began using heroin as a painkiller.

== Music and lyrics ==
The album features elements of thrash metal, death metal, and sludge metal, but is mostly considered a groove metal album overall. The Great Southern Trendkill is considered the band's heaviest release, featuring much screamed vocals, most notably on "Suicide Note Pt. II" and the opening title track, while also featuring some of the fastest tempos and most down-tuned guitars: "The Underground in America" and "(Reprise) Sandblasted Skin", in particular, were played in A=425 Hz standard D tuning, with the sixth string tuned to a low G. It also has a more experimental nature, such as the acoustic guitars and ballads.

Like Pantera's previous album, Far Beyond Driven, the vocals are often double-tracked and layered. An example of this can be heard in the chorus of "13 Steps to Nowhere", when Phil Anselmo's singing voice is backed up by high-pitched screaming, done by Seth Putnam of the band Anal Cunt. Screams done by Anselmo on the song "The Great Southern Trendkill" were compared to Putnam.

The lyrical themes on The Great Southern Trendkill include drugs, a flood that ends mankind, finding deeper meaning, anger, and the media.

"Floods", the album's longest song, contains a guitar solo considered by many to be Dimebag Darrell's finest. Guitar World magazine voted it as the 32nd greatest guitar solo of all-time, Darrell's highest ranking of three solos to make the list (the other two being his solos from "Cemetery Gates", ranked 35th, and "Walk", ranked 57th).

== Release ==
The album was released on May 7th, 1996, by Elektra Records and East West Records. The album was an immediate commercial success, though was not as successful as their previous album, peaking at number four on the Billboard 200, where it opened at 149,000 copies. Although it did chart in numerous other countries such as Australia, Canada, and the UK, where it peaked within the top 20. The album would later receive multiple certifications, including a platinum certification in the United States for selling over a million copies.

The band would later tour the album with Eyehategod and White Zombie, where Anselmo would suffer a near fatal overdose that would leave him legally dead for 5 minutes before an adrenaline shot revived him.Official Live: 101 Proof, released in 1997.

== Critical reception ==
Professional ratings
Review scores
Source	Rating
AllMusic	3/5 stars
Artistdirect	5/5 stars
BBC Music	favorable
Chronicles of Chaos	9/10
Collector's Guide to Heavy Metal	9/10
Entertainment Weekly	C+
Los Angeles Times	2/4 stars
Rolling Stone	2/5 stars
Pitchfork	7.7/10

The Great Southern Trendkill received mixed to positive reviews from music critics upon release and was more polarizing than Pantera's previous albums. Steve Huey of AllMusic gave it a score of 3 out of 5 stars and stated, "Longtime Pantera fans will find plenty to enjoy here, and the band's expanding range bodes well, but overall, Trendkill is an inconsistent outing."

In retrospective analysis, the album has often been looked on more favorably, being noted as their heaviest and most aggressive work. In a retrospective review for Pitchfork, Saby Reyes-Kulkarni awarded it a score of 7.7/10 and summarized their review by saying "Intended as a rallying cry against shifting trends, Pantera's most abrasive album comes off more like a cry for help that reveals the turmoil eating the band from within. It's also thrilling." In 2024, Jon Wiederhorn of Loudwire stated "The Great Southern Trendkill writhes and rails with desperation and self-loathing and roars with a new reservoir of aggression and intensity, making it the heaviest album Pantera ever released." In 2019, Kerrang! ranked it as the best Pantera album.

"10's" appears in the English dub of Dragon Ball Z: Broly – The Legendary Super Saiyan.

The album is available as downloadable content for the video game Rock Band, with the exception of "Suicide Note Pt. I".

== Reissue ==
On August 12, 2016, Pantera announced the release of a 20th anniversary edition of The Great Southern Trendkill for October 21. The reissue features two discs, including a remastered version of the original album as well as 12 unreleased tracks (these include instrumentals, as well as alternative mixes and live recordings from the Dynamo Festival in 1998). In addition, a separate LP named The Great Southern Outtakes was released. It consists of songs also released on disc 2 of Trendkill's reissue except for the intro and early mix of "Suicide Note Part l".

== Track listing ==
All tracks are written by Pantera.

No.	Title	Length
1.	"The Great Southern Trendkill"	3:47
2.	"War Nerve"	4:53
3.	"Drag the Waters"	4:55
4.	"10's"	4:49
5.	"13 Steps to Nowhere"	3:37
6.	"Suicide Note Pt. I"	4:44
7.	"Suicide Note Pt. II"	4:19
8.	"Living Through Me (Hells' Wrath)"	4:50
9.	"Floods"	6:59
10.	"The Underground in America"	4:33
11.	"(Reprise) Sandblasted Skin"	5:39
Total length:		53:05

Japanese edition bonus track
No.	Title	Length
12.	"Walk" (Live at the Hollywood Palladium, CA, June 27, 1992)	5:29
Total length:		59:07

20th anniversary edition bonus disc
No.	Title	Length
1.	"The Great Southern Trendkill" (2016 Mix)	4:07
2.	"War Nerve" (Live at Dynamo Festival, 1998)	5:21
3.	"Drag the Waters" (Alternative Early Mix)	5:00
4.	"10's" (Alternative Early Mix)	4:53
5.	"13 Steps to Nowhere" (Instrumental Version)	3:40
6.	"Suicide Note Pt. I" (Intro)	1:13
7.	"Suicide Note Pt. I" (Alternative Early Mix)	3:53
8.	"Suicide Note Pt. II" (Live at Dynamo Festival, 1998)	4:48
9.	"Living Through Me (Hells' Wrath)" (Instrumental Version)	4:54
10.	"Floods" (Alternative Early Mix)	7:19
11.	"The Underground in America" (Alternative Early Mix)	3:56
12.	"(Reprise) Sandblasted Skin" (Live at Dynamo Festival, 1998)	4:34
Total length:		53:38

== Personnel ==
Pantera

- Phil Anselmo – lead vocals, backing vocals
- Dimebag Darrell – guitars, backing vocals, 12-string acoustic guitar on "Suicide Note Pt. I"
- Rex Brown – bass guitar, backing vocals
- Vinnie Paul – drums, backing vocals

Additional personnel

- Seth Putnam – additional vocals on "The Great Southern Trendkill", "War Nerve", "13 Steps to Nowhere", and "Suicide Note Pt. II"
- Ross Karpelman – keyboards on "Suicide Note Pt. I" and "Living Through Me (Hells' Wrath)"

Technical personnel

- Terry Date – production, recording, mixing
- Vinnie Paul – production, recording, mixing
- Pantera – co-production
- Ulrich Wild – recording

== Charts ==
Chart (1996)	Peak position
Australian Albums (ARIA)	2
Austrian Albums (Ö3 Austria)	14
Belgian Albums (Ultratop Flanders)	22
Belgian Albums (Ultratop Wallonia)	19
Canada Top Albums/CDs (RPM)	35
Danish Albums (Hitlisten)	14
Dutch Albums (Album Top 100)	61
European Albums (Music & Media)	13
Finnish Albums (Suomen virallinen lista)	4
French Albums (SNEP)	14
German Albums (Offizielle Top 100)	29
Hungarian Albums (MAHASZ)	21
Japanese Albums (Oricon)	43
New Zealand Albums (RMNZ)	5
Norwegian Albums (VG-lista)	14
Scottish Albums (Official Charts)	61
Swedish Albums (Sverigetopplistan)	7
Swiss Albums (Schweizer Hitparade)	37
UK Albums (Official Charts)	17
UK Rock & Metal Albums (Official Charts)	3
US Billboard 200	4

== Certifications ==
Region	Certification	Certified units/sales
Australia (ARIA)	Gold	35,000^{^}
Japan (RIAJ)	Platinum	200,000^{^}
New Zealand (RMNZ)	Gold	7,500^{^}
United Kingdom (BPI)	Silver	60,000^{^}
United States (RIAA)	Platinum	1,000,000^{^}
^{^} Shipments figures based on certification alone.
