= Damageplan =

2003–2004 American metal band

- From left to right: Bob Zilla, Vinnie Paul, Patrick Lachman, Dimebag Darrell

Background information
- Also known as: New Found Power (2003)
- Origin: Dallas, Texas, U.S.
- Genres: Groove metal; nu metal
- Years active: 2003–2004
- Label: Elektra
- Spinoffs: Hellyeah
- Spinoff of: Pantera
- Past members: Vinnie Paul; Dimebag Darrell; Patrick Lachman; Bob Zilla; Shawn Matthews

Damageplan was an American heavy metal band from Dallas, Texas, active between 2003 and 2004. Following the demise of their previous group Pantera, brothers Dimebag Darrell and Vinnie Paul Abbott wanted to start a new band. The pair recruited former Halford guitarist Patrick Lachman on vocals, and later Bob Zilla on bass. Damageplan released New Found Power, their only album, in February 2004. New Found Power debuted at number 38 on the Billboard 200, selling 44,676 copies in its first week.

While Damageplan was promoting the album at a concert on December 8, 2004, at the Alrosa Villa nightclub in Columbus, Ohio, deranged fan Nathan Gale climbed on stage and killed guitarist Dimebag Darrell and three others before being fatally shot by a police officer. Although no motive was found, some of Gale's friends reported that he believed that Pantera had stolen his lyrics and that its former members were attempting to steal his identity. Damageplan's manager confirmed there are unreleased Damageplan recordings, although they have not surfaced, and the band has been inactive since the incident. Vinnie and Zilla joined the band Hellyeah, and Lachman joined the Mercy Clinic. Vinnie Paul died in 2018.

== History ==
=== Formation ===
By 2003, drummer Vinnie Paul and guitarist Dimebag Darrell were plagued with difficulties that their previous metal band, Pantera, was experiencing. Both described the performance level of Pantera's vocalist, Phil Anselmo, as "hit and miss, depending on what type of chemicals he was on". Following the release of Pantera's 2000 album Reinventing the Steel and the subsequent tour, Anselmo and bassist Rex Brown started to focus on their side projects, and remained out of contact with the brothers, affecting their ability to write or record any future Pantera material. Both Abbott brothers eventually chose to move on from Pantera, as they began writing new material on their own.

A demo of the song "Crawl" was sent to former Halford guitarist Pat Lachman who auditioned as vocalist. Lachman was hired, and New Found Power was formed in early 2003 with former Jerry Cantrell guitarist Shawn Matthews on bass initially, who was replaced after the album recording with the brothers' tattoo artist, Bob Zilla. When writing music, Paul claimed; "we put no boundaries on it ... we wanted it to be very diverse", and Darrell said "We wanted to stretch out and expand our capabilities to their fullest." The band changed its name to Damageplan and decided to name the first album New Found Power.

=== New Found Power ===
The single "Save Me" debuted on American radio on January 26, 2004, and the band's debut album, New Found Power, was released in the United States on February 10. The album was recorded at the brothers' backyard studio, Chasin' Jason, in Arlington, Texas, where previous Pantera albums were also recorded. The Abbott brothers found out that during recording, everyone was willing to contribute and "put 100% effort into it" while with Pantera, but they found it too difficult to have Anselmo in the recording studio. Corey Taylor of Slipknot and Stone Sour, Zakk Wylde of Black Label Society, and Jerry Cantrell of Alice in Chains made guest appearances on the tracks "Fuck You", "Soul Bleed", and the bonus track "Ashes to Ashes" respectively, and Sterling Winfield handled co-production duties.

New Found Power sold 44,676 copies in its first week to debut at number 38 on the Billboard 200. The album received mixed reviews from music critics; Christine Klunk of PopMatters commented "I'm not in the least bit interested in where this band goes or what new and exciting ways they'll think of to abuse the listeners," while Johnny Loftus of AllMusic felt it was a "blazing new beginning".

Alice in Chains' vocalist/guitarist Jerry Cantrell attended a Thanksgiving party hosted by the Abbott brothers. Darrell and Paul had a demo of the first song they wrote, titled "Ashes to Ashes". Lachman insisted that it was on the "backburner" until Cantrell showed interest. The band entered the Abbott brothers' backyard studio with Cantrell to record "Ashes to Ashes". Although the song was not completed in time to be featured on New Found Power, it was included on the Japanese version, and for the soundtrack The Punisher: The Album. To promote New Found Power, the band toured with Hatebreed, Drowning Pool, and Unearth on the second installment of the Headbangers Ball.

=== Death of Dimebag Darrell ===
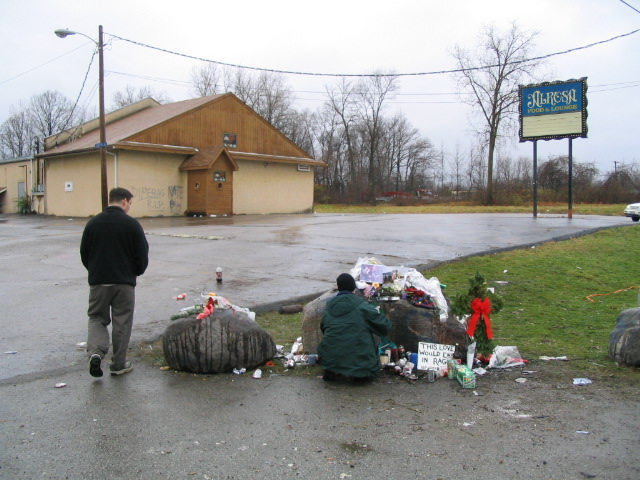
Fans pay tribute at the Alrosa Villa nightclub, three days after the murder

On December 8, 2004, the band was on a tour at the Alrosa Villa nightclub in Columbus, Ohio. Moments into the concert, Nathan Gale, a deranged 25-year-old fan, climbed onto the stage, drew a 9 mm Beretta 92FS, and shot Dimebag Darrell five times in the head, killing him. The band's head of security Jeffery "Mayhem" Thompson then engaged in hand-to-hand combat with Gale, which allowed Paul and other members to escape. However, Thompson was shot and killed in the ensuing struggle. A fan named Nathan Bray, who attempted to give CPR to Thompson and Darrell, and Erin Halk, a U.S. Marine-turned-roadie who tried to disarm Gale while he was reloading, were both shot and killed as well. Once the police arrived, Columbus Police officer James Niggemeyer approached the stage from behind, and saw Gale holding his weapon to a hostage. Niggemeyer shot Gale once in the head with a 12-gauge Remington Model 870, killing him instantly. Fifteen shots were fired by Gale, and an additional 36 rounds were found in his possession.

A police investigation did not find any motive behind the shooting, although Gale's mother stated that he was diagnosed with paranoid schizophrenia, and that he believed the Abbott brothers had stolen his lyrics while trying to steal his identity. She was unaware if her son took the medication he was given for his condition, but was proud of his military service following his discharge, and had given him the weapon that was used in the shooting. Major Jason Johnston, a Marine Corps spokesman at The Pentagon, was unable to comment on Gale's discharge.

A foundation called The Dimebag Darrell Memorial Fund was founded after the incident, which donated its profits to cover medical expenses of drum technician John Brooks and tour manager Chris Paluska, who were among those injured during the shooting. A public memorial service for Darrell took place on December 14, 2004, at Arlington Convention Center in Arlington, Texas. Many musicians paid tribute to Darrell on message boards and at live performances.

In May 2005, Niggemeyer was called before a grand jury, which was convened by the Franklin County prosecutor's office to examine the actions taken on the night of Dimebag Darrell's demise, a standard practice when deadly force is used. The jury found that there was no wrongdoing on Niggemeyer's part. Franklin County prosecutor Ron O'Brien commented, "There was little doubt [the shooting] was lawful, given the 200 eyewitnesses and the circumstances that surrounded the shooting. Nevertheless, we still have an independent body review the facts". Niggemeyer was nominated for a bravery award on the TV show America's Most Wanted.

=== Aftermath ===
In a 2005 interview, Damageplan manager Paul Bassman said that unreleased recordings before Darrell's death were near completion. He commented, "Vinnie Paul has said there will be a follow-up album down the road, as Dime would have wanted his music to be heard." Rumors circulated of another album, although nothing has been released.

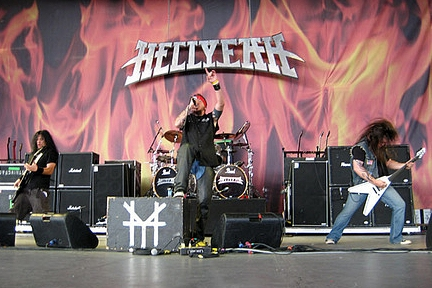
Abbott and Zilla joined Hellyeah following Darrell's death

Following the events since Dimebag Darrell's death, Paul was unsure if he wanted to continue playing music. He was invited to join the band called Hellyeah, which included members of Mudvayne and Nothingface, but declined the offer. However, bassist Jerry Montano repeatedly called Paul, and he accepted the offer to join the project as he thought "Everybody had their head in the right place." Hellyeah released its debut album on April 10, 2007. One week later, Zilla joined the band as its new bassist, after Montano left due to "personal reasons". The album was recorded at Abbott's backyard studio, Chasin' Jason, where New Found Power was also recorded.

Vocalist Lachman joined The Mercy Clinic, which aided the grieving process. He commented, "you have to get back on the horse. You could easily let a decade go by and not do anything. I'm happy to have walked away with my life after the situation I was thrown into. But, I mean, what do you do? I'm a musician. I'm going to make music. What Dime would have told me was, 'You make music, motherfucker. Get back on it. Do what you do.' So, that's what I did." Before the shooting, Phil Anselmo stated in the December 2004 edition of Metal Hammer that Dimebag "deserves to be severely beaten". He apologized and said the "severely beaten" comment was a joke, although Paul requested Metal Hammer to provide the audio tapes to discern the nature of the comments. Paul concluded that the quote was not a joke and referred to Anselmo as the "master of lies".

A book titled A Vulgar Display of Power: Courage and Carnage at the Alrosa Villa was penned by author Chris Armold. For 14 months, Armold interviewed people and researched the events leading up to December 8, stating "It's not a book about rock stars, but heroes, regular guys who made the ultimate sacrifice." In his research, Armold found no evidence that the comments Anselmo made before Darrell's death had influenced Gale's actions. The book was released in 2007.

Vinnie Paul died on June 22, 2018, at the age of 54.

== Lyrical themes and style ==
"Wake Up" (2004)
30 second sample from "Wake Up" demonstrating Lachman's vocals, Darrell's out the high-speed, high-volume riffs, and Abbott's plodding, heavy-handed rhythm as written by Christine Klunk of PopMatters

Damageplan's sound has been described as groove metal, nu metal and thrash metal. According to Johnny Loftus of AllMusic, Damageplan incorporated elements of traditional heavy metal, post-grunge, metalcore, and death metal.

The lyrical process was a collaborative effort consisting of Paul, Darrell, and Lachman. Themes explored on the album included the brothers' experiences, Darrell commented, "the crumbling of one empire and then starting over ... So there are a lot of lyrics about being reborn in a sense, about it being a new day, moving forward, letting go of the past and becoming something new." This is exemplified in the songs "Reborn", "Wake Up", and "Breathing New Life". "Blunt Force Trauma" is about when someone or something comes up behind you when you least expect it, "it could be a situation in your life, it could be a person you know with a beer bottle".

When writing music, the Abbott brothers suggested guitar riffs and "grooves", while Lachman added his input to modify the song's structure. The band's sound has been described by music critics to be similar to Pantera. Christine Klunk of PopMatters disliked the similarities and commented, "aside from a constant, driving rhythm, repetitive riffs, and unintelligible lyrics about (I'm assuming) kicking ass—there's nothing of interest to pay attention to". The song "Breathing New Life" features 180 beats-per-minute bass drum pedaling, what Vik Bansal of MusicOMH described as "exploding into a blaze of riffage and a cool chorus". Bansal was impressed with certain elements of the song such as the switch from downbeat singing to "a big chorus lodged in power chord heaven", and the incorporated groove rhythms. However, he felt Dimebag "borrow[ed]" Anthrax's guitar solo from the song "Only".

== Band members ==
Final lineup

- Vinnie Paul – drums (2003–2004, died 2018)
- Dimebag Darrell – guitars, backing vocals (2003–2004, his death)
- Patrick Lachman – lead vocals (2003–2004)
- Bob Zilla – bass, backing vocals (2003–2004)

Previous members

- Shawn Matthews – bass, backing vocals (2003)

== Discography ==
=== Albums ===
List of studio albums, with selected chart positions and sales figures
Title	Details	Peak chart positions			Sales
Title	Details	US	AUS	UK	Sales
New Found Power	Released: February 10, 2004; Label: Elektra; Format: CD, 2xLP	38	94	133	US: 167,106+

=== Singles ===
Year	Title	US Main.	Album
2004	"Save Me"	16	New Found Power
2004	"Breathing New Life"	—	New Found Power
2004	"Explode"	—	New Found Power
2004	"Pride"	30	New Found Power
2004	"Reborn"	—	New Found Power
"—" denotes singles that were released but did not chart.

=== Other appearances ===
Year	Title	Album
2004	"Ashes to Ashes" (featuring Jerry Cantrell)	New Found Power and The Punisher: The Album

=== Music videos ===
Year	Title	Director
2004	"Save Me"	Salzy
2004	"Breathing New Life"	Red Ezra
2004	"Explode"	Red Ezra
