= New Found Power =

Studio album by Damageplan
- Released: February 10, 2004
- Recorded: August 20, 2003 – January 5, 2004
- Studios: Chasin' Jason Studios in Dalworthington Gardens, Texas, U.S.; Marshall Sound Design in Dallas, Texas, U.S. (Soul Bleed)
- Genres: Groove metal; nu metal
- Length: 61:49
- Label: Elektra
- Producers: Vinnie Paul; Dimebag Darrell; Sterling Winfield (co-prod.); Patrick Lachman (co-prod.)

Singles from New Found Power
- 1. "Save Me" Released: 2004; 2. "Pride" Released: 2004

New Found Power is the only studio album released by the American heavy metal supergroup Damageplan. The group was formed by brothers "Dimebag" Darrell Abbott (guitar) and Vinnie Paul Abbott (drums) after the breakup of their previous band, Pantera. This is the final album that was released during Darrell's lifetime, before his death less than 10 months after the release.

"New Found Power" was also the original name of the band but was changed prior to the album's release. The record sold 44,676 copies in its first week to debut at number 38 on the Billboard 200.

== Overview ==
The album was recorded at the Abbott brothers' backyard studio, Chasin' Jason in Arlington, Texas, where previous Pantera albums had been recorded. It also features guest appearances from vocalist Corey Taylor and guitarists Jerry Cantrell and Zakk Wylde, who had previously made live guest appearances with Pantera, as well as being close friends with all band members.

The single "Save Me" debuted on American radio on January 26, 2004. "Breathing New Life" served as the album's music video debut and aired frequently on both Headbangers Ball and Uranium in early 2004. This was followed by videos for "Save Me" and "Explode".

Many of the lyrical themes on New Found Power seem to deal with the breakup of Pantera, of which "Dimebag" Darrell Abbott and drummer Vinnie Paul Abbott were founding members along with Rex Brown.

New Found Power is guitarist Dimebag Darrell's last studio appearance prior to his murder in December 2004. Following the murder of Darrell Abbott during a Damageplan concert, there had been speculation about a follow-up to the album. In 2006 when Vinnie Paul was asked about the follow-up in an interview, he replied "it will happen when the time is right. I want to stay focused where I am now." At the time, he was busy promoting his new band Hellyeah and their self-titled debut album. He also mentioned "I think the fans would want to hear it, so yes I'd say within 10 years."

== Critical reception ==
Professional ratings
Review scores
Source	Rating
AllMusic	3/5 stars
Blender	3/5 stars
Blabbermouth.net	7/10
Collector's Guide to Heavy Metal	7/10

New Found Power received mixed to positive reviews from music critics. Christine Klunk of PopMatters commented "I'm not in the least bit interested in where this band goes or what new and exciting ways they'll think of to abuse the listeners." However, AllMusic's Johnny Loftus was more positive: he considered the album a "blazing new beginning" with Lachman emerging as a "strong frontman" and the band having "too much solid material" to be dragged down by a few weak songs.

== Track listing ==
All tracks are written by Dimebag Darrell, Vinnie Paul, and Patrick Lachman

No.	Title	Length
1.	"Wake Up"	4:29
2.	"Breathing New Life"	3:49
3.	"New Found Power"	3:25
4.	"Pride"	4:17
5.	"Fuck You" (featuring Corey Taylor)	3:09
6.	"Reborn" (featuring Zakk Wylde)	4:02
7.	"Explode"	3:13
8.	"Save Me"	3:36
9.	"Cold Blooded"	4:57
10.	"Crawl"	5:30
11.	"Blink of an Eye"	4:19
12.	"Blunt Force Trauma"	4:57
13.	"Moment of Truth"	6:51
14.	"Soul Bleed" (featuring Zakk Wylde)	5:13
Total length:		61:49

Japanese version
No.	Title	Length
15.	"Ashes to Ashes" (featuring Jerry Cantrell; also available on The Punisher: The Album)	5:06
Total length:		66:55

== Personnel ==
Credits adapted from liner notes, except where noted.

Damageplan

- Patrick Lachman − vocals
- Dimebag Darrell − guitars
- Bob Zilla − bass
- Vinnie Paul − drums

Guest musicians

- Corey Taylor − second verse, breakdown, and last chorus on "Fuck You"
- Zakk Wylde − second guitar solo on "Reborn" and answer vocals on "Soul Bleed"
- Jerry Cantrell − vocals on "Ashes to Ashes" (uncredited on New Found Power, credited on The Punisher: The Album release)

Production

- Vinnie Paul, Dimebag Darrell − production
- Sterling Winfield, Patrick Lachman − co-production
- Howie Weinberg, Roger Lian − mastering (at Masterdisk studios, New York)
- Johnny Marshall − string arrangement on "Soul Bleed"
- Sterling Winfield − mixing of "Soul Bleed"
- Rae Nimeh − additional sequencing and production on "Pride"
- All other arrangements recorded and mixed at Chasin' Jason Studios, Texas

== Charts ==
Chart (2004)	Peak position
Australian Albums (ARIA)	94
UK Albums (Official Charts)	133
UK Rock & Metal Albums Chart (Official Charts)	17
US Billboard 200	38
