= Gasoline (band) =

American rock band

- Origin: United States
- Genres: Southern rock, heavy metal

Gasoline was an American Southern rock band and side project of former Pantera member Vinnie Paul. Paul described the group's general theme as "booze and women". The band has covered artists such as Pat Travers, Ted Nugent, Black Sabbath, W.A.S.P., Thin Lizzy, Quiet Riot, and Slayer, but have also performed original songs like "This Ain't a Beer Belly, It's a Gas Tank For My Love Machine" and "Get Drunk Now".

Regarding the band's formation, Paul stated:

"Pantera played every New Year's Eve until about '97. After that, the other two guys decided they didn't want to play on New Year's Eve, and that was my favorite time to play. Me and Dime decided that we'd put together a good time band and just do cover tunes and it was all about beer drinkin' and hell raisin'."

In 2006, Pantera's ex-bassist Rex Brown played with Vinnie Paul in Texas for the first time in several years with the band.
