= Floods (Pantera song) =

Promotional single by Pantera

from the album The Great Southern Trendkill
- Released: May 22, 1996
- Recorded: 1995–1996
- Genre: Heavy metal
- Length: 7:00
- Label: East West
- Songwriter(s): Dimebag Darrell; Vinnie Paul; Phil Anselmo; Rex Brown
- Producer(s): Terry Date; Vinnie Paul

"Floods" is a song by American heavy metal band Pantera from their 1996 album The Great Southern Trendkill. A ballad, it is the longest song on the album and the third-longest song the band has recorded, after "Cemetery Gates" (7:03) and "Hard Lines, Sunken Cheeks" (7:01). An early mix of the song was released on the 20th anniversary edition of The Great Southern Trendkill.

== Background ==
Pantera bassist Rex Brown said about "Floods":

That was one of my favorite bass lines on that song. We'd rehearsed it a couple of times and Dime and I sat down for quite a while with that. It was more of trying to get yourself in a mellow mood. It's a blazing solo with a really cool rhythm section underneath it - I'm really proud of the bass line. I think that was Dime's favorite solo on that song.

The lyrics of the song tell about atrocious acts committed by mankind such as rape, murder, and war, and contain a plea to God to flood the earth in a fashion like that described in the biblical Book of Genesis.

== Guitar solo ==
The song features one of Dimebag Darrell's most popular guitar solos, and is regarded as one of his greatest. The solo was originally a riff written by Darrell in the mid-1980s, and footage exists of him performing these licks as early as 1986. Guitar World magazine voted his solo as the 32nd-greatest of all time. Darrell built the solo from his improvised solos he played in concerts, before the band was signed.

Darrell on the solo:

That particular solo was thought-out in a more orchestrated fashion than some of the others I play where I just start ripping right off the bat. ... The thing that really makes the 'Floods' solo come across like it does is [bassist] Rex's playing behind it. He's using his fingers and he plays a whole bunch of cool licks and shit in there. He definitely adds to the vibe and feel of my lead because I'm playing off his part a lot—it was a great foundation for me to build on, man.

Darrell also said:

I picked up the idea of doubling from Randy Rhoads. It seemed appropriate to start off in a slow, melodic fashion and then build and build and build to the climax with the big harmonic squeals at the end.

For that last big note I think there's four guitars going on. There's a squeal at the second fret of the G string, a squeal at the fifth fret of the G and then I used a DigiTech Whammy pedal on two-string squeals at the harmonics at the fourth and 12th frets of the G and B strings, I believe. That was one of those deals where I didn't plan it out.

I just sat there and fucked with it until it sounded right.

== Reception ==
Classic Rock writer Stephen Dalton described "Floods" as "Pantera's 'Bohemian Rhapsody'". Dalton also described it as "a seven-minute, shape-shifting, post-apocalyptic epic featuring one of Dimebag Darrell's finest solos, an octave-vaulting baroque ejaculation that sounds like Brian May on steroids".

Metal Hammer ranked "Floods" 9th on their list of the 50 best Pantera songs. They described it as an all-time classic.

Guitar World ranked the song 20th on their list of the 25 greatest Pantera songs.
