= P.O.D. discography =

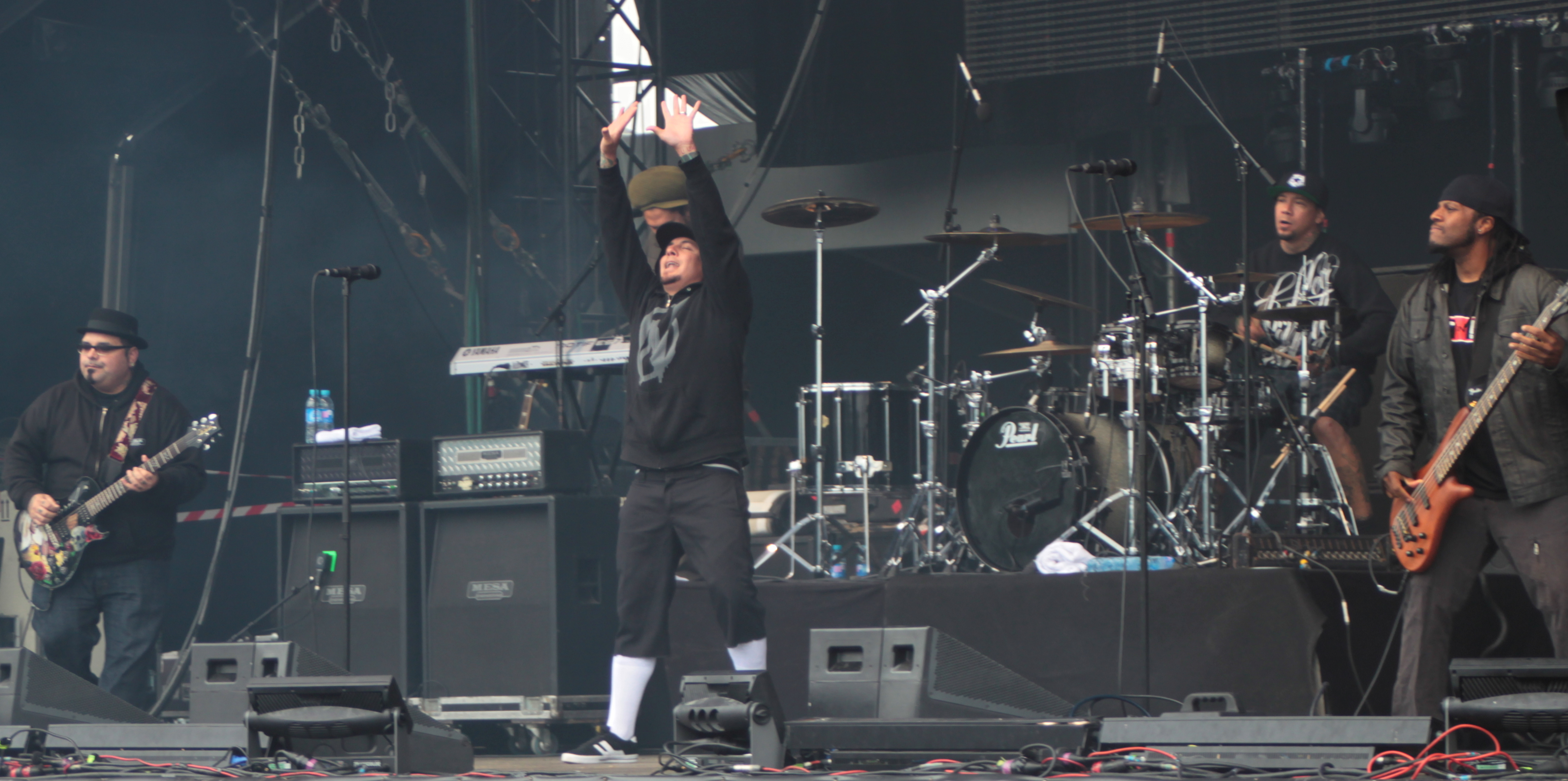
- Studio albums: 11
- Extended plays: 2
- Live albums: 3
- Compilation albums: 1
- Singles: 21
- Video albums: 1
- Music videos: 26
- Promotional singles: 3
- Acoustic albums: 1

The discography of American Christian rock band P.O.D. consists of 11 original studio albums, 1 acoustic studio album, 3 live albums, 1 compilation album, 2 video albums, 2 extended plays, 22 singles, 3 promotional singles and 26 music videos.

== Albums ==
=== Studio albums ===
List of studio albums, with selected chart positions and certifications
Title	Details	Peak chart positions										Certifications
Title	Details	US	US Christ.	AUS	FRA	GER	IRE	NZ	SWE	SWI	UK	Certifications
Snuff the Punk	Released: January 25, 1994 (US); Label: Rescue; Formats: CD, LP, digital download	—	—	—	—	—	—	—	—	—	—	
Brown	Released: October 8, 1996 (US); Label: Rescue; Formats: CD, LP, digital download	—	—	—	—	—	—	—	—	—	—	
The Fundamental Elements of Southtown	Released: August 17, 1999 (US); Label: Atlantic; Formats: CD, CS, LP, digital download	51	1	—	—	—	—	32	—	—	—	RIAA: Platinum
Satellite	Released: September 11, 2001 (US); Label: Atlantic; Formats: CD, CS, LP, digital download	6	1	19	50	5	7	4	8	11	16	RIAA: 3× Platinum; ARIA: Gold; MC: Platinum; BVMI: Gold; GLF: Gold; BPI: Gold
Payable on Death	Released: November 4, 2003 (US); Label: Atlantic; Formats: CD, CS, LP, digital download	9	1	48	109	30	—	34	45	31	162	RIAA: Gold
Testify	Released: January 24, 2006 (US); Label: Atlantic; Formats: CD, LP, digital download	9	1	81	—	54	—	9	—	64	—	
When Angels & Serpents Dance	Released: April 8, 2008 (US); Label: INO, Columbia; Formats: CD, LP, digital download	9	1	—	—	—	—	—	—	—	—	
Murdered Love	Released: July 10, 2012 (US); Label: Razor & Tie; Formats: CD, LP, digital download	17	1	—	—	—	—	—	—	—	—	
The Awakening	Released: August 21, 2015; Label: Universal, T-Boy; Formats: CD, LP, digital download	75	3	—	—	—	—	—	—	—	—	
Circles	Released: November 16, 2018; Label: Mascot; Formats: CD, LP, digital download	— (Note: Circles did not enter the Billboard 200, but peaked at number 93 on the Top Album Sales chart.)	12	—	—	—	—	—	—	—	—	
Veritas	Released: May 3, 2024; Label: Mascot; Formats: CD, vinyl, digital download	— (Note: Veritas did not enter the Billboard 200, but peaked at No. 34 on the Billboard Top Current Album Sales.)	10	—	—	—	—	—	—	34	— (Note: Veritas did not chart on the UK Albums Chart, but reached No. 31 on the UK Rock & Metal Albums chart)	
"—" denotes a recording that did not chart or was not released in that territory.

=== Acoustic albums ===
List of acoustic albums, with selected chart positions
Title	Details	Peak chart positions
Title	Details	US Christ.
SoCal Sessions	Released: November 17, 2014 (US); Label: Universal, T-Boy; Formats: CD, LP, digital download	30

=== Live albums ===
List of live albums
Title	Details
Payable on Death Live	Released: February 18, 1997 (US); Label: Rescue; Formats: CD
Live at Cornerstone	Released: 2006 (US); Label: Atlantic; Formats: CD
Rhapsody Originals	Released: December 2, 2008 (US); Label: Rhapsody; Formats: Digital download

=== Compilation albums ===
List of compilation albums, with selected chart positions
Title	Details	Peak chart positions			
Title	Details	US	US Christ.	NZ	UK Christ.
Greatest Hits: The Atlantic Years	Released: November 21, 2006 (US); Label: Rhino; Formats: CD, digital download	152	8	5	6

=== Video albums ===
List of video albums, with selected chart positions
Title	Details	Peak chart positions
Title	Details	US Video
Still Payin' Dues	Released: November 5, 2002 (US); Label: Atlantic; Formats: DVD	9

== Extended plays ==
List of extended plays, with selected chart positions
Title	Details	Peak chart positions
Title	Details	US Christ.
The Warriors EP	Released: May 4, 1999 (US); Label: Tooth & Nail; Formats: CD, digital download	—
The Warriors EP, Volume 2	Released: November 15, 2005 (US); Label: Atlantic; Formats: CD, digital download	21
"—" denotes a recording that did not chart or was not released in that territory.

== Singles ==
=== As lead artist ===
List of singles, with selected chart positions, showing year released and album name
Title	Year	Peak chart positions										Certifications	Album
Title	Year	US	US Alt	US Main	AUS	DEN	GER	IRE	SWE	SWI	UK	Certifications	Album
"Southtown"	1999	—	28	31	—	—	—	—	—	—	—		The Fundamental Elements of Southtown
"Rock the Party (Off the Hook)"	2000	—	27	25	—	—	—	—	—	—	—		The Fundamental Elements of Southtown
"School of Hard Knocks"	2000	—	38	—	—	—	—	—	—	—	—		Little Nicky: Music from the Motion Picture
"Alive"	2001	41	2	4	18	7	16	15	12	51	19	RMNZ: Gold	Satellite
"Youth of the Nation"	2001	28	1	6	17	10	5	20	7	16	36	ARIA: Gold; BVMI: Gold; RMNZ: Platinum	Satellite
"Boom"	2002	— (Note: "Boom" did not enter the Billboard Hot 100, but peaked at number 23 on the Bubbling Under Hot 100 Singles chart.)	13	21	43	—	83	—	38	—	—	RMNZ: Gold	Satellite
"Satellite"	2002	—	21	15	—	—	—	—	—	—	120		Satellite
"Sleeping Awake"	2003	—	14	20	41	—	55	16	—	30	42		The Matrix Reloaded: The Album
"Will You"	2003	— (Note: "Will You" did not enter the Billboard Hot 100, but peaked at number 17 on the Bubbling Under Hot 100 Singles chart.)	12	12	61	—	—	—	—	68	68		Payable on Death
"Change the World"	2004	—	38	32	—	—	—	—	—	—	—		Payable on Death
"Goodbye for Now"	2005	48	25	17	—	—	76	—	—	—	—		Testify
"Lights Out"	2006	—	—	30	—	—	—	—	—	—	—		Testify
"Going in Blind"	2006	—	—	35	—	—	—	—	—	—	—		Greatest Hits: The Atlantic Years
"The San Diego Chargers Anthem"	2007	—	—	—	—	—	—	—	—	—	—		Non-album single
"Addicted"	2008	—	—	30	—	—	—	—	—	—	—		When Angels & Serpents Dance
"Shine with Me"	2008	—	—	—	—	—	—	—	—	—	—		When Angels & Serpents Dance
"Lost in Forever"	2012	—	30	3	—	—	—	—	—	—	—		Murdered Love
"Higher"	2012	—	—	12	—	—	—	—	—	—	—		Murdered Love
"Beautiful"	2013	—	38	5	—	—	—	—	—	—	—		Murdered Love
"This Goes Out to You"	2015	—	—	18	—	—	—	—	—	—	—		The Awakening
"Listening for the Silence"	2018	—	—	23	—	—	—	—	—	—	—		Circles
"Rockin' with the Best"	2019	—	—	34	—	—	—	—	—	—	—		Circles
"Drop"	2023	—	—	—	—	—	—	—	—	—	—		Veritas
"Afraid to Die" (feat. Tatiana Shmayluk)	2023	—	—	18	—	—	—	—	—	—	—		Veritas
"I Won't Bow Down" (original or with A.N.I.M.A.L.)	2024	—	—	28	—	—	—	—	—	—	—		Veritas
"Lies We Tell Ourselves"	2024	—	—	—	—	—	—	—	—	—	—		Veritas
"I Got That"	2024	—	—	—	—	—	—	—	—	—	—		Veritas
"Don't Let Me Down" (Beatles cover)	2025	—	—	—	—	—	—	—	—	—	—		Non-album single
"—" denotes a recording that did not chart or was not released in that territory.

=== As featured artist ===
List of featured singles, with selected chart positions, showing year released and album name
Title	Year	Album
"Lion's Roar" (DJ Robinson featuring P.O.D.)	2025	Non-album single
"—" denotes a recording that did not chart or was not released in that territory.

=== Promotional singles ===
List of promotional singles, showing year released and album name
Title	Year	Album
"Outkast"	1999	The Fundamental Elements of Southtown
"Set It Off"	2001	Satellite
"Freedom Fighters" (live)	2004	Non-album single
"Sounds Like War"	2005	Testify
"On Fire"	2011	Murdered Love
"Soundboy Killa"	2017	Circles
"Circles"	2018	Circles
"Christmas Lullaby"	2020	Christmas Rocks EP

== Other appearances ==
List of non-single guest appearances, showing year released and album name
Title	Year	Album
"Whatever It Takes"	2000	Any Given Sunday: Music from the Motion Picture
"Freestyle" (Knock 'Em Out the Box Remix)	2000	Ready to Rumble soundtrack
"Christmas in Cali"	2001	Kevin & Bean Present Swallow My Eggnog
"Set It Off" (Tweaker Remix)	2002	The Scorpion King soundtrack
"Outkast" (Live)	2002	Ozzfest 2002
"America" (Santana featuring P.O.D.)	2002	Shaman
"The Messenjah" (Tweaker Remix)	2003	A Man Apart soundtrack
"Boom" (The Crystal Method Remix)	2003	Biker Boyz soundtrack
"Satellite" (Oakenfold Remix)	2003	Lara Croft: Tomb Raider – The Cradle of Life soundtrack
"Truly Amazing"	2004	The Passion of the Christ: Original Songs Inspired by the Film
"Murder One"	2004	DOPE 2004 Movie
"The Payback"	2005	XXX: State of the Union – Music from the Motion Picture
"Booyaka 619"	2006	WWE: Wreckless Intent
"Lights Out" (Chris Vrenna Remix)	2007	TMNT: Teenage Mutant Ninja Turtles

== Music videos ==
Year	Song	Director
1996	"Selah"	Devin DeHaven
1999	"Southtown"	Marcos Siega
2000	"Rock the Party (Off the Hook)"	Marcos Siega
2000	"School of Hard Knocks"	David Slade
2001	"Alive"	Francis Lawrence
2001	"Youth of the Nation"	Paul Fedor
2002	"Boom"	Gavin Bowden
2002	"Satellite"	Marcos Siega
2003	"Sleeping Awake"	Marc Webb
2003	"Will You"	Marc Webb
2004	"Change the World"	Marc Webb
2006	"Goodbye for Now"	Meiert Avis
2006	"Booyaka 619"	
2006	"Lights Out"	Estevan Oriol
2006	"Going in Blind"	Ryan Smith
2008	"When Angels & Serpents Dance"	Bill Curran
2008	"Addicted"	Michael Maxxis
2011	"On Fire"	Wuv
2012	"Lost in Forever"	Spence Nicholson
2012	"Murdered Love"	Ramon Boutviseth
2012	"Higher"	Ramon Boutviseth
2013	"Beautiful"	Rich Ragsdale
2015	"This Goes Out to You"	
2017	"Soundboy Killa"	
2018	"Rockin' With the Best"	J.T. Ibanez
2018	"Listening For The Silence"	J.T. Ibanez
2020	"Panic Attack"	Nathan Mowery
2020	"Circles"	J.T. Ibanez
2023	"Drop"	Matthew Mikel Stallings
2023	"Afraid to Die"	J.T. Ibanez and Parke Fox
2024	"I Won't Bow Down"	Matthew Mikel Stallings
2024	"Lies We Tell Ourselves"	J.T. Ibanez
2024	"I Got That"	J.T. Ibanez and Parke Fox
2025	"Don't Let Me Down"	J.T Ibanez
2026	"OUTBREAK"	J.T Ibanez
