= Dirtbag =

Dirtbag or dirt bag may refer to:

- sandbag, a sack filled with soil or sand
- Dirtbag, a type of footbag made of suede and filled with sand
- Dirtbag Clothing, a San Francisco-based apparel company
- The Dirtbags, the unofficial name for the Long Beach State 49ers baseball team
- Dirtbag (StillWell album)
- Dirtbag left, a style of vulgar and populist left-wing politics
- Dirtbag (Teenage Mutant Ninja Turtles), a mutant appearing in the Teenage Mutant Ninja Turtles franchise

== See also ==
- "Teenage Dirtbag", a 2000 Wheatus single
