= Nailed Promise =

American Christian metal band

- Origin: Fort Worth, Texas, United States
- Genres: Post-grunge, Christian hardcore, Christian metal, Hardcore punk, Nu metal, Alternative metal
- Labels: Rescue; Pluto
- Members: Nathan Garcia; Matthew Miller; Travis Brown; Ryan Brown
- Website: Nailed Promise on Facebook

Nailed Promise is a Christian metal band from Fort Worth, Texas. The band consists of vocalist and guitarist Nathan Garcia, drummer Matthew Miller, and brothers, guitarist Travis Brown and bassist Ryan Brown. The band signed to Rescue Records, a record label owned by Noah Bernardo Sr. with bands including Point of Recognition, Dogwood, and P.O.D. The band was active from 1994 until 2002 when they were signed to Pluto Records.

== Members ==
Current

- Nathan Garcia - Vocals, Guitar, Bass
- Travis Brown - Guitar
- Ryan Brown - Bass
- Matthew C. Miller - Drums
- Joel Bailey - Bass
- Joel Kieker - Bass
- Dax - Vocals

== Discography ==
Studio albums

- Life Through Death (1995)
- Realize (1998)

Splits

- Mindrage & Nailed Promise (2001; w/ Mindrage)

Demo

- Pat McGuire Demo (1996)
- Jabberwocky
