= Snuff the Punk =

Studio album by P.O.D.
- Released: January 25, 1994
- Recorded: 1993
- Studio: The Studio (San Diego, California)
- Genres: Nu metal; Christian metal; rap metal; hardcore punk
- Length: 44:33
- Label: Rescue
- Producers: Noah Bernardo, Sr.

P.O.D. chronology
Snuff the Punk (1994)	Brown (1996)

Alternate cover
- Cover art for the 1999 remaster

Snuff the Punk is the debut studio album by American Christian nu metal band P.O.D. It was released on January 25, 1994 by Rescue Records, owned by Noah Bernardo, Sr (lead vocalist Sonny Sandoval's uncle and drummer Wuv Bernardo's father). Described as an early example of nu metal, the album has a more punk-influenced sound with overtly Christian lyrics. A remaster with new artwork was released by independent label Diamante in 1999.

Despite the band's popularity, Snuff the Punk continues to fly under the radar. Reviews of the album are scarce, but the existing ones have been mixed, praising its early version of the band's mix of hardcore punk, heavy metal and hip-hop, but criticizing its raw production, lack of cohesion and preachy lyrics.

== Background and recording ==
P.O.D. (also known as Eschatos and Enoch) started as a punk and metal band in the San Diego neighborhood of San Ysidro or "Southtown." With guitarist Marcos Curiel and drummer Wuv Bernardo, the band covered songs by their favorites bands, such as Bad Brains, the Vandals, Slayer, and Metallica. They began incorporating jazz, reggae and Latin music when writing their own music, while the hiring of Wuv's cousin and then rapper, Sonny Sandoval, brought in hip-hop influences.

"Three In the Power of One", the band's first song, was recorded in 1992 and later included on Snuff the Punk. After recording a demo tape, Traa Daniels joined the band in 1994 when they needed a bassist for some shows, replacing the founding member Gabe Portillo. P.O.D. signed with Rescue Records, a label created by Bernardo's father, Noah Bernardo Sr., who was also the band's first manager. who released the album on January 25, 1994, along with their second studio album Brown (1996) and live album Payable on Death Live (1997).

== Composition and lyrics ==
Rooted in the San Francisco Bay Area punk scene, Snuff the Punk's music has been inspired by genres such as hip hop and reggae in a hardcore punk tune. This unique sound crossed cultural boundaries, both racial and religious. As such, Rescue advertised the album in press as "hardcore with a hip-hop appeal to it." Another major influence was heavy metal, especially rap metal, a genre the band is generally associated with. Despite this, the album is more punk-influenced and overtly Christian than the band's releases with Atlantic Records.

Snuff the Punk has been described as an early nu metal album. While P.O.D. rose to popularity as a nu metal band, Korn's self-titled debut album, released a few months later, has been seen as the genre's "first shot". It has also been described as a hardcore punk album. Lyrically, the album is centered on faith, conflict, and growing up in a multicultural, working-class area. The opening track, "Coming Back" shows the band's Pentecostalism beliefs, with the title referring to Jesus, while "Who Is Right?" is a punk rock song with anti-racist lyrics promoting multi-racial friendships, a response to the 1992 Los Angeles riots.

== Release ==
Snuff the Punk was released on January 25, 1994 with a cover art showing a cartoon character with a gun aimed at the Devil. It established P.O.D. as a popular band in the hardcore punk and Christian underground subcultures. They began to tour the U.S. promoting their album. They played in small venues, churches and bars, and slowly developed a following of "warriors" nationwide. 25,000 copies of the album were sold in the first few years, mostly at shows. The band tried to take advantage of their growing fanbase to secure a major record deal, but were unable to.

Snuff the Punk was reissued three times after its original release in 1994. The first reissue has the same cover art, and was released in 1996. The second reissue, also a remix and remaster, has censored cover art. The rerelease shows a character with wings punching the Devil. It also has an alternate P.O.D. logo, without the band's full name, Payable on Death, and was released in 1999 by independent label Diamante. The third reissue, a special edition, is based on the remaster, but combines "Who's in This House?" and the anti-abortion song "Murder" into one track. It also includes live video of "Selah" and "Full Color" from the band's second album, Brown, and was released in 2000.

== Critical reception ==
Professional ratings
Review scores
Source	Rating
AllMusic	3.5/5 stars
Jesus Freak Hideout	4.5/5 stars

Steve Huey of AllMusic felt the album captures the band in their formative stage, with a less coherent rap metal sound, but still "providing enough moments of raw power to satisfy fans." Allan Price of Jesus Freak Hideout declared that Snuff the Punk offers "bold, Bride-like lyrics," while the heaviness of the music is not compromised. He prefers this to the more watered down lyrics on Satellite (2001). Price concluded the only downside is the band repeating their name too often, and recommends you buy the 2000 reissue.

The Hard Times reviewer Anthony Vito, who included the album on his "30 Alt Metal Records Turning 30" list, said its "what you expect from a band of this ilk just finding their bearings," with bouncy metallic riffs and hip-hop flavored vocals. Additionally, he says there's "enough slap bass to send Flea to the nearest restroom." Guitar World ranked Snuff the Punk at number 22 on their "Superunknown: 50 Iconic Albums That Defined 1994" list.

== Track listing ==
All lyrics are written by P.O.D. except "Draw the Line" by House of Suffering; all music is composed by P.O.D.

No.	Title	Length
1.	"Coming Back"	3:46
2.	"Let the Music Do the Talking"	3:44
3.	"Draw the Line"	2:52
4.	"Who Is Right?"	3:47
5.	"Get It Straight"	3:19
6.	"Run"	3:16
7.	"Snuff the Punk"	3:03
8.	"Can You Feel It?"	4:48
9.	"Three in the Power of One"	4:15
10.	"Every Knee"	4:14
11.	"Who's in This House?"	2:35
12.	"Abortion Is Murder"	2:42
Total length:		44:33

2000 Special Edition videos
No.	Title	Length
1.	"Selah" (Live)
2.	"Full Color" (Live)

Notes

- Track 12 is also known as simply "Murder"
- Tracks 11 and 12 are combined on the remaster and Special Edition

== Personnel ==
All band members are credited by their first name only, bar Noah Bernardo, who is credited as “Wuvy” in the liner notes.

- Sonny Sandoval – vocals
- Marcos Curiel – guitar
- Traa Daniels – bass guitar
- Noah "Wuvy" Bernardo – drums
