= Goodbye for Now (song) =

2005 single by P.O.D.

Single by P.O.D.

from the album Testify
- B-side: "Why Wait?"; "Lights Out (Chris Vrenna Mix)"
- Released: November 8, 2005
- Recorded: December 2004 – July 2005
- Studio: John Phillips Estate, Palm Springs, California; The Plant, Sausalito, California; Aerowave Studios, Encino, California; Signature Sound in San Diego, California; Henson Studios in Hollywood, California
- Genre: Alternative rock; rap rock
- Length: 4:32; 3:57 (radio edit)
- Label: Atlantic
- Songwriters: Noah Bernardo; Traa Daniels; Sonny Sandoval; Jason Truby
- Producers: Glen Ballard; P.O.D.

P.O.D. singles chronology
"Change the World" (2003)	"Goodbye for Now" (2005)	"Sounds Like War" (2006)

Music video
- "Goodbye for Now" on YouTube

"Goodbye for Now" is a song by P.O.D. and the lead single from their sixth studio album, Testify, released in 2006. It features a 21-year old Katy Perry vamping over the final chorus of the song. She also appeared in the music video. Her contribution, however, was not enough to earn her a guest appearance at that time. The track was later included on Greatest Hits: The Atlantic Years in 2006.

"Goodbye for Now" received considerable radio play and was used in promotional videos for the film The Chronicles of Narnia: The Lion, the Witch and the Wardrobe. It is the band's most successful single since 2002's "Youth of the Nation" and reached No. 48 on the Billboard Hot 100 on January 31, 2006 (making it their third Hot 100 entry), No. 41 on the Billboard Pop 100, No. 25 on the U.S. Alternative Songs, and No. 17 on the U.S. Mainstream Rock Tracks charts.

The song's music video also reached the No. 1 spot on MTV's TRL and became P.O.D.'s fourth No. 1 video.

== Sound and composition ==
Musically, "Goodbye for Now" reintroduced rap vocals to P.O.D.'s singles catalog; the style had not been prominently heard on any single since 2002's "Satellite." The song also emphasizes clean melody and vocal harmony while lacking any heavy guitar work. Katy Perry's drawn out backup vocals enter during the final chorus shortly before the song comes to an end. P.O.D. frontman Sonny Sandoval described the feel and meaning behind "Goodbye for Now" in an MTV interview:

"It's more of a laid-back track, it's more of a vibe track, it's definitely not the heavy side of P.O.D., but lyrically it's a hopeful song. . . We know with just dealing with the people around us and just coming across so many people that there are a lot of people struggling out there. And being that positive influence that we like to have in our music, we are just trying to encourage people. No matter how bad today is, tomorrow has a bright promise and a bright future. There's a lyric that says, 'If joy really comes in the morning time/ Then I'm going to sit back and wait until the next sunrise.' And in our faith, we believe that joy does come in the morning time, so just hold on and hang out and tomorrow is a whole different day."

Producer Glen Ballard introduced Perry to P.O.D., and Sandoval said, "You could tell she came from a good family, and just wanted to show the Jesus tattoo on her wrist. And she was like: ‘I think I saw you guys in a (Christian) youth rally so many years ago.’ I’m like: ‘That’s so cool.’ But here she was in Hollywood trying to do her thing and make her career."

Perry also appeared in the song's music video. She performed the song live with the band during an appearance on The Tonight Show with Jay Leno. However, the band has not performed the song live since 2007.

== Track listing ==
1. "Goodbye for Now"
2. "Why Wait?"
3. "Lights Out" (Chris Vrenna Mix)

== Official versions ==
- Album Version
- Radio Edit (Video Version/Promo) 3:56

== Charts ==
Chart (2006)	Peak position
Czech Republic Airplay (ČNS IFPI)	43
Germany (GfK)	76
Latvian Airplay (LAIPA)	33
Polish Airplay Top 100 (ZPAV)	28
US Billboard Hot 100	48
US Billboard Alternative Airplay	25
US Billboard Mainstream Rock Tracks	17
