= Goodbye for Now =

Goodbye for Now may refer to:

- "Goodbye for Now" (Desperate Housewives), an episode of the television series Desperate Housewives
- "Goodbye for Now" (song), a song by P.O.D.
- "Goodbye for Now", a song by Stephen Sondheim from the film Reds, also recorded by Barbra Streisand
- Goodbye for Now, a single album by Cho Kyu-hyun
