= Raise It Up =

Raise It Up may refer to:

- Raise It Up (album), a 2015 album by StillWell
- "Raise It Up" (August Rush song), 2007
- "Rabbit Heart (Raise It Up)", a 2009 song by Florence and the Machine
