= Traa Daniels =

American bass guitarist (born 1970)

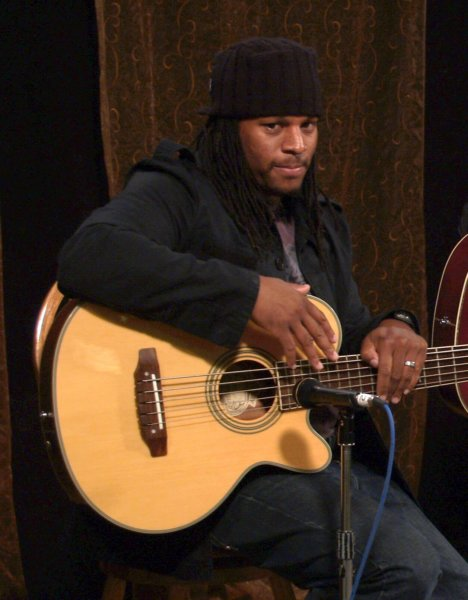
- Daniels in 2008

Background information
- Also known as: Traa
- Born: Mark Daniels; December 30, 1970 (age 55); Cleveland, Ohio, U.S.
- Origin: San Diego, California, U.S.
- Genres: Alternative metal; Christian metal; nu metal; rap metal
- Occupation: Musician
- Instruments: Bass guitar, vocals
- Years active: 1992–present
- Member of: P.O.D.

Mark "Traa" (Note: Pronounced "Trey") Daniels (born December 30, 1970) is an American musician who is the bass guitarist of the Christian rock band P.O.D. He has been a member since 1993 and has performed on all of the band's official records. The band has released thirteen albums – Snuff the Punk, Brown, Payable on Death Live, The Fundamental Elements of Southtown, Satellite, Payable on Death, Testify, Greatest Hits: The Atlantic Years, When Angels & Serpents Dance, Murdered Love, SoCal Sessions, The Awakening, and Circles. Traa is married and has two children, and as a bassist, has a jazz and funk background.

In 2005, Daniels signed an endorsement deal with Warrior, to produce a signature bass guitar designed to his specifications. Traa is also the president of a production company known as Ryot Entertainment. The company has teamed up with SteelRoots. He is the manager of the alternative band The Wrecking. He originally comes from Cleveland, Ohio.

== Discography ==
=== P.O.D. ===
- Snuff the Punk (1994)
- Brown (1996)
- The Fundamental Elements of Southtown (1999)
- Satellite (2001)
- Payable on Death (2003)
- Testify (2006)
- When Angels & Serpents Dance (2008)
- Murdered Love (2012)
- SoCal Sessions (2014)
- The Awakening (2015)
- Circles (2018)
- Veritas (2024)
