= Seismic (album) =

Studio album by Dogwood
- Released: January 28, 2003
- Genre: Punk rock
- Label: Tooth & Nail
- Producer: Sean O'Donnell, Sam Boukas

Dogwood chronology
Matt Aragon (2002)	Seismic (2003)	Reverse, Then Forward Again (2004)

Professional ratings
Review scores
Source	Rating
ARTISTdirect	3/5 stars
Jesus Freak Hideout	4/5 stars
PunkNews	4.5/5 stars
Sputnik Music	3/5 stars

Seismic is the seventh studio album by San Diegan punk band Dogwood, originally titled Your Tongue Is the Deadliest of Arrows by the band. Artwork photos feature former members Scott Bergen and Eddie Spangler, although they did not perform on the album's recording, and both had left the band by the time of its release. Bassist Jason Harper announced he was leaving the group during the album's recording.

== Track listing ==
1. "Seismic"
2. "Selfish Americans"
3. "Conscience in a Cave"
4. "Sunsets Are But Once a Day"
5. "Absolution"
6. "Home Is Here"
7. "Your Tongue Is the Deadliest of Arrows"
8. "Trailer Full of Tragedies"
9. "Faith"
10. "What Matters"
11. "Last of the Lost"
12. "Crushing"
