= Veritas (P.O.D. album) =

Studio album by P.O.D.
- Released: May 3, 2024
- Recorded: 2023
- Studios: Thunder Paw Studios; Big Fish Studios; Streetwalker Studios
- Genres: Nu metal; alternative metal; rap metal
- Length: 34:50
- Label: Mascot
- Producer: Heavy

P.O.D. chronology
Circles (2018)	Veritas (2024)

Singles from Veritas
- 1. "Drop" Released: September 21, 2023; 2. "Afraid to Die" Released: November 30, 2023; 3. "I Won't Bow Down" Released: January 18, 2024; 4. "Lies We Tell Ourselves" Released: March 21, 2024; 5. "I Got That" Released: May 3, 2024

Veritas is the eleventh studio album by American Christian nu metal band P.O.D. It was released on May 3, 2024, via Mascot Records, and is the first album by the band not to feature drummer Wuv Bernardo after he went on hiatus in 2021. It was produced by production duo Heavy, who had previously produced Circles (2018), and features guest appearances from Randy Blythe, Tatiana Shmayluk, and Cove Reber.

== Background ==
In August 2021, drummer Wuv Bernardo dropped from the band's European leg of the 20th anniversary tour for Satellite and subsequently left as a result, later clarifying that he would be on hiatus from the band. Former Suicide Silence drummer Alex Lopez was recruited as touring drummer. After occasional shows and festivals, the band released the single "Drop" featuring Randy Blythe on September 21, 2023, announcing the album and its title. On November 30, 2023, "Afraid to Die" featuring Tatiana Shmayluk was released, and when "I Won't Bow Down" was released in January 2024, the band announced the release date of the album.

In an interview with Loudwire, Sonny Sandoval suggested that Veritas was one of the best albums the band has ever done. Marcos Curiel expressed satisfaction with the album in an interview with Soundsphere magazine after the album's release, stating that "There’s been a few haters here and there, but it’s a beautiful thing. We did our job, and we caused a spark, whether you love it or hate it."

== Critical reception ==
Professional ratings
Review scores
Source	Rating
AllMusic	4/5 stars
Blabbermouth.net	9/10
Distorted Sound	3/10
Jesus Freak Hideout	4/5 stars
Kerrang!	3/5
Metal Epidemic	3/5 stars
Metal Hammer	2.5/5 stars
Riff Magazine	7.0/10 stars

Jesus Freak Hideout's David Craft gave 4 out of 5 and said, "Veritas ultimately reflects a band that knows its strengths and plays to them, yet occasionally stumbles in its pursuit of growth. The album swings between impactful anthems and moments of predictability, resulting in a solid, if not groundbreaking, addition to P.O.D.'s discography. It serves as a reminder of the band's enduring presence in the rock scene, even as it leaves room for growth and surprises in future projects."

Kerrang! was mixed in its review and said, "Veritas, as the lovers of Latin out there will tell you, means 'truth'. In the interest of full transparency, then, P.O.D.'s 11th studio album is unlikely to win the San Diegans any fans outside of the nu-metal firmament. Not because it's bad; it's a frequently punchy and arresting collection. But it's much the same as the band that set the world on fire in the early-'00s, then were seemingly snuffed."

Metal Hammer's Sam Coare wrote, "It was perhaps too much to expect P.O.D. to dramatically reinvent or reinvigorate their sound. Rather than offering anything new or of note, Veritas serves as a poor facsimile of what once conjured excitement around the band’s name all those years ago."

Distorted Sound was highly unfavorable, stating "What P.O.D. have achieved across 11 albums cannot be denied, but Veritas finds them operating on the level of a token metal entry at the Eurovision song contest, and not a particularly good one. When record number 12 rolls around, they might consider having something to prove."

Blabbermouth.net gave a positive review, stating "P.O.D. are known for their eclectic mix of sounds, especially incorporating reggae, punk and hip-hop into their rock style, But "Veritas" is one of the band's most straight-forward rock records, with a real basic rock 'n' roll sound. The straight-ahead sound works for P.O.D., because it has them relying on their guttural, raw energy and delivering profound lyrics without a lot of competition. Veritas is the familiar-sounding album that longtime P.O.D. fans should love. It also frees the band to experiment, if they wish, on their next release."

Riff Magazine's Mike DeWald says, "The members of P.O.D., or Payable On Death, wear their heart on their sleeve on the band’s 11th album, Veritas, and the result is one of their most urgent, aggressive and heavy statements."

Metal Epidemic's Ross Bowie said, "In a world where nu metal nostalgia is all the rage, it makes sense that P.O.D. would release a new album that sounds extremely similar to their heyday. The band are reliable and can turn out new music which will scratch the itch that the band is known for while not quite hitting the highs of their best material. While 2001’s Satellite was the band’s big moment and saw them have genuine mainstream hits, they have stayed on a steady course since then being a reliable band with the exception of 2012’s Murdered Love, which was the bands mid-career highlight and while Veritas isn’t quite up to that level it has a lot of moments to enjoy."

AllMusic's Christian Genzel wrote of Veritas, "While the era in which P.O.D. came to full bloom is long gone—their last record to make a dent in the international charts was 2006's Testify—the group has simply continued to deliver well-made new records...One of P.O.D.'s strengths is that they're not big on sentimentality, and so the songs [on Veritas] have a matter-of-factness which keeps them from sounding like the band is trying to recapture their youth: they emphasize the heavier edges, not the passing of time...Veritas may not open up new avenues for the band, but it proves that after all these years, P.O.D. can still deliver rousingly defiant underdog anthems in their own style, fittingly described in the lyrics of "I Got That" as 'that underground, original, nothing-to-prove Southtown, don't-play-around Dago signature groove.' "

== Track listing ==
All lyrics are written by Sonny Sandoval; all music is composed by Sandoval, Marcos Curiel, Traa Daniels, Jordan Miller, and Jason Bell.

Veritas track listing
No.	Title	Length
1.	"Drop" (featuring Randy Blythe)	3:11
2.	"I Got That"	3:19
3.	"Afraid to Die" (featuring Tatiana Shmayluk)	3:04
4.	"Dead Right"	2:09
5.	"Breaking"	4:07
6.	"Lay Me Down (Roo's Song)"	3:27
7.	"I Won't Bow Down"	2:41
8.	"This Is My Life" (featuring Cove Reber)	2:58
9.	"Lies We Tell Ourselves"	3:28
10.	"We Are One (Our Struggle)"	2:50
11.	"Feeling Strange"	3:41
Total length:		34:50

== Personnel ==
P.O.D.

- Sonny Sandoval – vocals
- Marcos Curiel – guitars, backing vocals
- Traa Daniels – bass

Additional contributors

- Robin Diaz – drums
- Heavy – production, backing vocals
- Howie Weinberg – mastering
- Josh Wilbur – mixing
- Sergio Chavez — engineering
- Chris Chavez – engineering assistance
- Ryan Clark — art direction, design
- Jeremiah Scott — photography
- Randy Blythe – guest vocals on track 1
- Tatiana Shmayluk – guest vocals on track 3
- Cove Reber – guest vocals on track 8

== Charts ==
Chart performance for Veritas
Chart (2024)	Peak position
Swiss Albums (Schweizer Hitparade)	34
UK Album Downloads (Official Charts)	58
UK Rock & Metal Albums (Official Charts)	31
