= Dogwood (California band) =

American punk rock band

- Origin: Escondido, California
- Genres: Pop punk; punk rock; skate punk; Christian punk; hardcore punk; melodic hardcore
- Years active: 1993–present
- Labels: Tooth & Nail; Rescue; Facedown
- Members: Josh Kemble; Jason Harper; Sean O'Donnell; Russell Castillo
- Past members: Shawn Beaty; Jayce Molina; Billy Nichols; Bill Driscol; Scott Bergan; Corbin King; Josh Hagquist; Dan Ardis; Andrew Montoya; Joe Sidoti; Rob Hahn; Danny Montoya
- Website: Dogwood on MySpace

Dogwood is a punk rock band from Escondido, California, founded in 1993. Their music has been compared to that of the Offspring, and they list Bad Religion, NOFX and Lagwagon as musical influences.

== History ==
In 1993, Josh Kemble united with Jayce Molina on guitar, Josh Hagquist (of the Beautiful Mistake) on bass, and Billy Nichols on drums to form the band Half-Off. After a few shows, the band decided to find a better name, and a relative suggested "Dogwood" in reference to the legend of the dogwood cross.

By 1996, Dogwood had been signed by the now-defunct Rescue Records label, which was also the home for such bands as P.O.D., No Innocent Victim, and Point Of Recognition. While on Rescue, Dogwood released two studio records, Good Ol' Daze and Through Thick & Thin. Dogwood and Rescue Records parted ways, and then in 1998 the band self-released an eponymous album. This was later re-released without the track "Never Die" as This is Not a New Album on Facedown Records.

The band caught the eye of Tooth & Nail Records. In 1999, the album More Than Conquerors was released, followed by Building a Better Me in 2000, Matt Aragon in 2001, and Seismic in 2003. In 2004, Tooth & Nail released a Dogwood greatest hits album titled Reverse, Then Forward Again.

After October 2011 the band went inactive. In a 2015 Breathecast.com interview, vocalist Josh Kemble said that the band never called it quits. He stated, "I think we just never really did an official farewell tour or breakup and we also haven't played in a really long time. Some people said it's over but we never actually declared that. It's kind of an unspoken, rode off into the sunset type of thing. There's that mystery of reunion or another show,".

On November 29, 2016, the band announced their reunion and played shows with MxPx and Five Iron Frenzy on January 13–14, 2017 in Ventura and San Diego, CA. This marked their first show since October 2011 and it featured the lineup of Kemble, O'Donnell, Harper, and Castillo. On December 19, 2017, the band teased a new song "Titles", part of Indie Vision Music's "Family and Friends Sampler" on December 24.

== Members ==
Current members

- Josh Kemble – lead vocals (1993–present)
- Russell Castillo – drums (1993–1998, 1998–2002, 2006–present)
- Sean O'Donnell – guitar (1997–2001, 2016–present) – former bassist for Yellowcard and vocalist/guitarist for Reeve Oliver
- Jason Harper º bass (1997–2002, 2016–present)

Former members

- Billy Nichols – drums (1993)
- Josh Hagquist – bass (1993–1994) – Former vocalist/guitarist for the Beautiful Mistake
- Jayce Molina – guitar (1993–1998)
- Bill Driscoll – bass (1994–1995)
- Shawn Beaty – bass, guitar (1995–1997) – Currently lead pastor at Clovis Hills Community Church in Clovis, CA
- Joe Sidoti – drums (1998)
- Scott Bergen – bass (2002)
- Andrew Montoya – drums (2003)
- Corbin King – drums (2003–2004)
- "Drummin'" Dan Ardis – drums (2004–2006) – Current drummer for Midnight Hour
- Danny Montoya – guitar, backing vocals (2001–2011)
- Rob Hann – bass (2002–2011)

Timeline

== Discography ==
=== Studio albums ===
- Good Ol' Daze (Rescue Records 1996)
- Through Thick & Thin (Rescue Records 1997)
- Dogwood (self-released 1998)
- More Than Conquerors (Tooth & Nail Records 1999)
- Building a Better Me (Tooth & Nail Records 2000)
- This is Not a New Album (Facedown Records 2001) (re-issue of the self-titled album)
- Matt Aragon (Tooth & Nail Records 2001)
- Seismic (Tooth & Nail Records 2003)

=== Live albums ===
- Live at Chain Reaction (Roadside Records, 2001)

=== Greatest Hits Compilations ===
- Reverse, Then Forward Again (Tooth & Nail Records 2004)

=== Splits / Various Artist Compilations ===
- "Preschool Days" and "Who Am I To Say Who Deserves What?" (Actually, Mislabeled.. The Song is a live version of "Stairway to Sin") on Rescue Records Live At Tomfest 1997 (Rescue Records 1997)
- "We The Automatons", "Out Of The Picture", and "My Best Year" on Dogwood / Incomplete Split EP (One Moment Records 2000)
- "Rest Assured" on Songs From The Penalty Box Volume Three (Tooth & Nail Records 1999)
- "Good Times" on Songs From The Penalty Box Volume Four (Tooth & Nail Records 2000)
- "the split ep" Dogwood/Incomplete (One Moment Records 2000)
- "Flowersoondie" on Songs From The Penalty Box Volume Five (Tooth & Nail Records 2002)
- "Sanctuary" on I'm Your Biggest Fan Volume Two (Tooth & Nail Records 2002)
- "Faith" on The Nail Volume 1 (Tooth & Nail Records 2003)
- "Seismic" on Radio Disaster Volume Six (Basement Records 2003)
- "Preschool Days" on Rescue Records 10th Anniversary (Rescue Records 2003)
- "A Cause, A Plan, An Execution" on Indievision SummerSlam (Indievision Music and Truestance Records 2006)
- "Clemency" on Friends with Microphones (One Truth Clothing 2006)

=== Guest appearances ===
- "Punk-Reggae Jam" on Payable on Death Live (Rescue Records 1997)

== Videography ==
- "Preschool Days" (from Through Thick and Thin)
- "Feel The Burn" (from More Than Conquerors)
- "Building A Better Me" (from Building A Better Me)

== Awards ==
- Best Punk Band 2001: San Diego Music Awards
- Best Punk Album 2002 (Matt Aragon): San Diego Music Awards
