= Brown (P.O.D. album) =

Studio album by P.O.D.
- Released: October 8, 1996
- Recorded: 1996
- Studio: Signature Sound (San Diego, California)
- Genres: Nu metal; rap metal; Christian metal; hardcore punk
- Length: 49:18
- Label: Rescue
- Producers: P.O.D.; Dennis Martinez; Noah Bernardo Sr.

P.O.D. chronology
Snuff the Punk (1994)	Brown (1996)	Payable on Death Live (1997)

Professional ratings
Review scores
Source	Rating
Cross Rhythms	(Original) (Reissue)
Jesus Freak Hideout	4/5 stars

Brown is the second studio album by American Christian nu metal band P.O.D. It was released on October 8, 1996, by Rescue Records. According to the band's official website in November 2000, the album sold 30,000 copies prior to P.O.D. getting signed to Atlantic Records in August 1998.

Lead singer Sonny Sandoval stated that the album's name was derived from an acronym in the title track, "Believe, Receive, Obtain, Withstand, Never die".

== Reissues ==
Brown was reissued three times after the original release of the album in 1996. The first re-release had an alternate P.O.D. logo and the band's full name, Payable on Death, on the front cover in 1998. A second reissue, which included a new front cover as well as remixed and remastered audio, was released in 2000. The last reissue of Brown was a Special Edition released in 2003 on an enhanced CD featuring the "Selah" music video, footage of P.O.D. performing "Breathe Babylon" live, and remastered audio.

== Track listing ==
All tracks are written by P.O.D.

No.	Title	Length
1.	"Intro"	0:47
2.	"Know Me"	4:31
3.	"Selah"	4:16
4.	"Visions"	3:26
5.	"Brown"	3:50
6.	"One Day"	4:01
7.	"Punks Rock"	1:44
8.	"Breathe Babylon" (feat. Dirt)	5:02
9.	"Funk Jam"	3:14
10.	"Preach"	2:33
11.	"Reggae Jam"	0:54
12.	"Full Color"	6:18
13.	"Seeking the Wise" (feat. Dirt)	4:34
14.	"Live and Die"	3:25
15.	"Outro"	0:43
Total length:		49:18

2003 Special Edition videos
No.	Title	Length
16.	"Selah" (Music video)
17.	"Breathe Babylon" (Live)

== Notes ==
- Tracks 1, 4, 5, 7, 9, 11 and 15 have no lyrics listed in the booklet, even though most of the songs actually have lyrics.
- Track 1 contains a sample of the LL Cool J song "I Shot Ya" off the album Mr. Smith (1995).
- Track 5 contains a sample of the Boogie Down Productions song "My Philosophy" off the album By All Means Necessary (1988).
- Track 14 contains a sample of the N.W.A song "Gangsta Gangsta" off the album Straight Outta Compton (1989).
- Track 15 samples the Eric B. & Rakim song "Eric B. Is President" off the album Paid in Full (1987).

== Personnel ==
P.O.D.

- Sonny Sandoval – vocals
- Marcos Curiel – lead guitar
- Traa Daniels – bass guitar
- Wuv Bernardo – drums, rhythm guitar

Guest musicians

- Mike$ki – scratching
- Dirt (from the Shadow of the Locust crew) – "Breathe Babylon" and "Seeking the Wise"

== Appearances ==
- "Selah" was featured on the soundtrack to the film Extreme Days in 2001.
