= More Than Conquerors (album) =

Studio album by Dogwood
- Released: May 18, 1999
- Genre: Punk rock
- Label: Tooth & Nail Records
- Producer: Nick Raskulinecz; Dogwood

Dogwood chronology
Dogwood (1998)	More Than Conquerors (1999)	Building A Better Me (2000)

Professional ratings
Review scores
Source	Rating
HM	(not rated) link

More Than Conquerors is the fourth full-length album by San Diego punk band Dogwood. It is their first to be released on Tooth & Nail Records. The title is a reference to the Bible passage Romans, chapter 8, verse 37; "Nay, in all these things we are more than conquerors through Him that loved us."

== Track listing ==
1. "Suffer"
2. "Rest Assured"
3. "Feel The Burn"
4. "Never Die"
5. "Out Of The Picture"
6. "My Best Year"
7. "Control"
8. "Everything Dies In Time"
9. "We Cry Victory"
10. "The Pain Is Gone"
11. "Confusion Zero"
12. "Left Out Cold"
13. "More Than Conquerors"
