= Noah Bernardo =

American drummer (born 1974)

Noah "Wuv" Bernardo
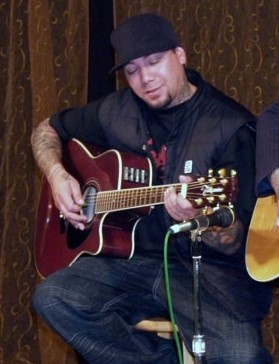
- Bernardo in 2008

Background information
- Born: Noah Bernardo Jr. February 24, 1974 (age 52)
- Genres: Alternative metal; Christian metal; nu metal; rap metal; reggae
- Occupation: Musician
- Instruments: Drums, guitar
- Years active: 1992–2021 (on hiatus)

Noah "Wuv" Bernardo Jr. (born February 24, 1974) is an American musician, most notably the drummer for nu metal band P.O.D. He also occasionally plays guitar.

== Biography ==
According to a FAQ, Bernardo is Filipino, Italian, German, and Chamorro. He is the first cousin of P.O.D. frontman Sonny Sandoval. His father, Noah Bernardo Sr., started Rescue Records, which was P.O.D.'s first label.

Wuv has been playing drums most of his life. During acoustic sets, he normally plays the rhythm guitar. He also has a side project called Southtown Generals, with Rasta Tim Pacheco. It was announced that Wuv would be handling drum duties for the band StillWell, a side project of Fieldy, the bassist of metal band Korn. In 2020, Bernardo formed a project called Belle and the Dragon, alongside members of Flyleaf.

In multiple interviews with Sonny and Wuv, it was confirmed that Wuv is on hiatus but "not out of the band", citing burnout from endless years of touring and slight tension within the band as the main reasons.

Bernardo was the co-owner of the Chula Vista skate shop "The Orphanage"; however, it is no longer in operation.

== Discography ==
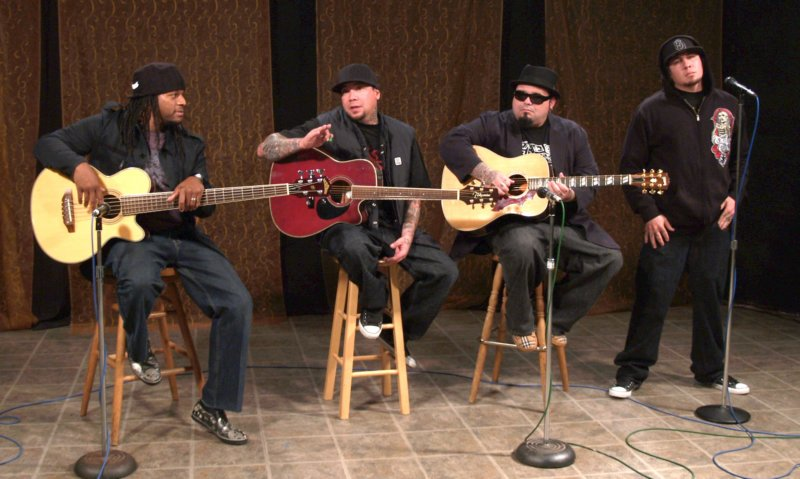
Bernardo with P.O.D. in 2008

P.O.D.

- Snuff the Punk (1994)
- Brown (1996)
- LIVE at Tomfest (1997)
- The Warriors EP (1998)
- The Fundamental Elements of Southtown (1999)
- Satellite (2001)
- Payable on Death (2003)
- The Warriors EP, Volume 2 2005
- Testify (2006)
- Greatest Hits: The Atlantic Years (2006)
- When Angels & Serpents Dance (2008)
- Murdered Love (2012)
- SoCal Sessions (2014)
- The Awakening (2015)
- Circles (2018)

Southtown Generals

- Southtown Generals (2010)

StillWell

- Surrounded by Liars EP (2011)
- Dirtbag (2011)
- Raise It Up (2015)
- Supernatural Miracle (2020)

Other appearances

- "A Song for Chi" (2009)
