= Matt Aragon =

Studio album by Dogwood
- Released: September 25, 2001
- Genre: Punk rock
- Label: Tooth & Nail Records

Dogwood chronology
Building a Better Me (2000)	Matt Aragon (2001)	Seismic (2003)

Matt Aragon is the sixth full-length album from San Diegan punk band Dogwood.

The album's title is in honor of the band's long-time friend Matt Aragon, who had continued to support and encourage the band as a whole and the members as individuals during a stressful period around the album's production.

The album was recorded in January 2001 at Motor Studios in San Francisco, and produced by Ryan Greene, most notable at the time for working with artists on the prominent punk record label Fat Wreck Chords such as NOFX, No Use for a Name, and Lagwagon. Guitarist Sean O'Donnell departed the band after the album's release.

The album went on to win a 2002 San Diego Music Award for Best Punk album.

== Track listing ==
1. "1983"
2. "Nothing is Everything"
3. "Matt Aragon"
4. "Lonely Road"
5. "Juice"
6. "Do or Die"
7. "Point Counterpoint"
8. "Singular"
9. "Challenger"
10. "Reasoner"
11. "A Hope Unseen"
12. "For What It's Worth"
