= Building a Better Me =

Studio album by Dogwood
- Released: October 10, 2000
- Recorded: Goldentrack, San Diego, California and The Blasting Room Studios, Fort Collins, Colorado
- Genre: Punk rock
- Label: Tooth & Nail Records
- Producer: Stephen Egerton; Dogwood

Dogwood chronology
More Than Conquerors (1999)	Building a Better Me (2000)	Matt Aragon (2001)

Professional ratings
Review scores
Source	Rating
Punknews	4.5./5 stars

Building a Better Me is the fifth full-length album from San Diegan punk band Dogwood released in 2000. Instrumentation for the album was produced and recorded by Sam Boukas and Dogwood at Goldentrack studio in San Diego but vocals were produced and recorded at the Blasting Room studios in Fort Collins, Colorado by Descendents and ALL guitarist Stephen Egerton, whose vocals appear on the final track "Nothing New". In 2001 the band was awarded the San Diego Music Award for best Punk band for the album.

== Track listing ==
1. "The Good Times"
2. "There's Room for Everyone"
3. "Building a Better Me"
4. "Comes Crashing"
5. "Autobiographies"
6. "Mycro"
7. "Come Back Down"
8. "The Battle of Them Vs. Them"
9. "Cheat Me"
10. "Someone See"
11. "The Bad Times (Reprise)"
12. "Overexposed"
13. "The Bad Times"
14. "Truth About It Is"
15. "Great Literature"
16. "Nothing New"
