= Stillwell =

American rock band

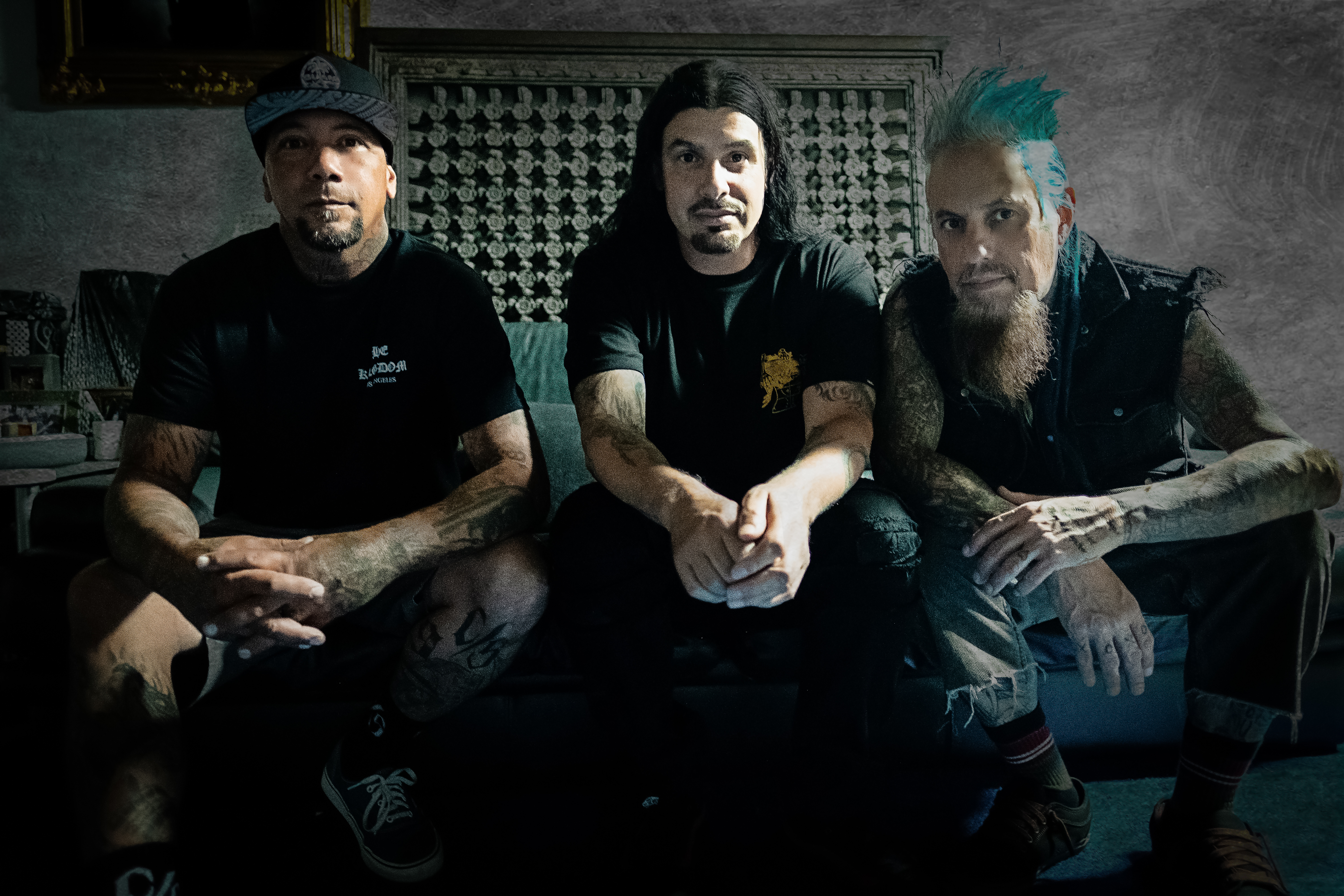
- Left to right: Noah Bernardo, Q-Unique, Reginald Arvizu (2020)

Background information
- Origin: Brooklyn, New York; Santa Ana and San Diego, California
- Genres: Alternative rock; hard rock; rap metal
- Years active: 2006–present
- Members: Q-Unique; Reginald "Fieldy" Arvizu; Noah "Wuv" Bernardo
- Past members: Pablo "Spider" Silva
- Website: stillwellrock.com

Stillwell is an American rock supergroup, formed by Q-Unique from The Arsonists and Kings Bounty, Reginald "Fieldy" Arvizu from Korn, and Wuv from P.O.D. The band has released three albums and one EP. Their most recent album, Rock the House, was released in 2022.

== History ==
Stillwell formed in early 2006, quickly entering the studio, and putting out their first single, "Killing Myself to Live" in October 2007. Since then, the band has been off-and-on recording their first album, although Fieldy's involvement in Korn is thought to play a factor in the long recording process. The band released their first album, a CD/DVD package titled Dirtbag, in 2011. Stillwell has opened shows for Korn. Their 2015 album Raise It Up reached the Billboard rock charts.

== Style ==
William Ruhlmann, writing for AllMusic, said that "Stillwell helpfully calls its music 'street metal,' which seems to be a combination of rap and heavy metal, but for the most part on Dirtbag, it sounds like a conventional, straightforward hard rock group".

== Members ==
Current members

- Q-Unique – vocals (2006–present), guitars (2018–present)
- Reginald "Fieldy" Arvizu – bass (2006, 2018–present), guitars (2011–2018)
- Noah "Wuv" Bernardo – drums (2006–present)

Former members

- Pablo "Spider" Silva – bass (2006–2018)

== Discography ==
=== Studio albums ===
List of studio albums
Title	Album details
Dirtbag	Released: May 10, 2011; Label: Nu Day; Formats: CD, digital download
Raise It Up	Released: November 13, 2015; Label: Rat Pak; Formats: CD, digital download
Supernatural Miracle	Released: September 18, 2020; Label: self-released; Formats: LP, CD, digital download
Rock the House	Released: September 16, 2022; Label: self-released; Formats: CD

=== Extended plays ===
List of extended plays
Title	Album details
Surrounded by Liars	Released: November 21, 2011; Label: Nu Day; Formats: CD, digital download

=== Music videos ===
List of music videos, showing year released and director
Title	Year	Director(s)
"Killing Myself to Live"	2009	—N/a
"On & Poppin"	2011	—N/a
"You Can't Stop Me"	2011	Sébastien Paquet, Scott Keyzers and Joshua Allen
"Surrounded by Liars"	2011	Sébastien Paquet
"Mess I Made"	2015	Lynwood Films
"Raise It Up"	2015	Lynwood Films
"A Come To Jesus Moment"	2020	Eric Casas
"Could've Sworn"	2020	AhrenEye
"You Don't Wanna Know"	2020	Fieldy, E. Quiles and Q-Unique
"Change the Channel"	2020	Fieldy, E. Quiles and AhrenEye
"Everything'll Be Better"	2021	AhrenEye
"Alright Alright"	2021	AhrenEye
"In a Rush"	2021	AhrenEye
