= SoCal Sessions =

Studio album by P.O.D.
- Released: November 12, 2014
- Length: 49:15
- Labels: Universal, T-Boy
- Producer: P.O.D.

P.O.D. chronology
| Murdered Love (2012) | SoCal Sessions (2014) | The Awakening (2015) |

Professional ratings
Review scores
| Source | Rating |
|---|---|
| CCM Magazine | 3/5 stars |
| Indie Vision | 3/5 stars |

SoCal Sessions is an acoustic album by P.O.D. It was released on November 12, 2014. The album contains 12 acoustic tracks from their previous studio albums: The Fundamental Elements of Southtown, Satellite, Payable on Death, Testify, When Angels & Serpents Dance, and Murdered Love.

== Background ==
Singer Sonny Sandoval stated on the background of the acoustic album, "We were jamming like this 22 years ago just for fun... So you kind of go through your catalog of songs that you could do acoustically and there is a handful of songs that we were doing that were fun so we wanted to get something out there for fun." The album was crowdfunded through PledgeMusic.

== Track listing ==
All tracks are written by P.O.D.

| No. | Title | Length |
|---|---|---|
| 1. | "Panic & Run" | 3:36 |
| 2. | "Will You" | 4:48 |
| 3. | "Youth of the Nation" | 4:22 |
| 4. | "No Ordinary Love Song" | 3:50 |
| 5. | "Strength of My Life" | 4:10 |
| 6. | "Alive" | 3:43 |
| 7. | "Higher" | 3:21 |
| 8. | "It Can't Rain Everyday" | 4:18 |
| 9. | "Lost in Forever" | 3:55 |
| 10. | "I'll Be Ready" | 4:49 |
| 11. | "Beautiful" | 4:27 |
| 12. | "Set Your Eyes to Zion" | 3:56 |
| Total length: | | 49:15 |

== Charts ==
| Chart (201) | Peak position |
|---|---|
| US Top Christian Albums (Billboard) | 30 |
| US Top Hard Rock Albums (Billboard) | 25 |
