= Testify (P.O.D. album) =

Studio album by P.O.D.
- Released: January 24, 2006
- Recorded: December 2004 – July 2005
- Studio: John Phillips Estate, Palm Springs, California; The Plant, Sausalito, California; Aerowave, Encino, California; Signature Sound, San Diego, California; Henson Studios, Hollywood, California
- Genre: Nu metal; Christian metal; rap rock; reggae rock
- Length: 50:19
- Label: Atlantic
- Producer: Glen Ballard, P.O.D.

P.O.D. chronology
The Warriors EP, Volume 2 (2005)	Testify (2006)	Greatest Hits: The Atlantic Years (2006)

P.O.D. studio album chronology
Payable on Death (2003)	Testify (2006)	When Angels & Serpents Dance (2008)

Singles from Testify
- 1. "Goodbye for Now" Released: November 8, 2005; 2. "Sounds Like War" Released: 2005; 3. "Lights Out" Released: February 17, 2006

Testify is the sixth studio album by American Christian nu metal band P.O.D. It was originally set for a December 2005 release, but was delayed until January 24, 2006 by Atlantic Records. Testify was also their last album with Jason Truby on guitar, before he left the band in December 2006.

Testify was also available in the Testify (Limited Edition) version with a bonus CD (called Beyond Testify) featuring commentary by the band on every song on the album, as well as four bonus songs and a remix that didn't make the album. The album's first single, "Goodbye for Now," went on to become the No. 1 music video on MTV's TRL. The song also enjoyed heavy play on the radio. Testify became the No. 1 selling Christian album on Billboard for several weeks and, as of May 2006, had been in the Top 25 for a total of 16 weeks. It opened at No. 9 on the Billboard 200 with 58,000 scans and has sold over 210,000 copies in the US and over 500,000 copies worldwide.

== Musical style and production ==
Bassist Traa Daniels stated "This album defines who we are musically as a foursome more than any other album that we've ever done." He added, "What we tried to do on this album. . . was to take people on a journey musically. . . I think we have a lot of different elements." Sonny Sandoval also noted, "We have one of the heaviest songs we ever wrote and one of the softest songs we ever wrote."

== Critical reception ==
Professional ratings
Aggregate scores
Source	Rating
Metacritic	(55/100)
Review scores
Source	Rating
AllMusic	4/5 stars
CBN	4.5/5 stars
Christianity Today	3.5/5 stars
Cross Rhythms	8/10 stars
Entertainment Weekly	C+
IGN	(6.8/10)
Jesus Freak Hideout	3.5/5 stars
Now Magazine	1/5 Ns
Rolling Stone	2/5 stars
Spin	(6/10)

According to the review aggregator Metacritic, Testify received "mixed or average reviews" based on a weighted average score of 55 out of 100 from 11 critic scores. Jason Bracelin of Blender gave the album two stars out of five and proclaimed, "On their fifth disc, these 'jah soldiers' run low on ammo" and elaborated that "on the ska-tinged 'Strength of My Life,' they sound like the world’s most polite rude boys, while 'Goodbye for Now' is the kind of listless modern rock that could be bottled and sold as a sleep aid." Rolling Stone's Christian Hoard similarly noted "Testify is not as pompous or overblown as you might think; it just feels tired. . . The most notable aspect of Testify, in fact, is how little P.O.D., or their guitars, have to say."

AllMusic's Matt Collar, however, gave the album 4/5 rating and considered guitarist Jason Truby's work a "truly inspired and technically brilliant performance." He also commended Sandoval's enthusiastic vocals regarded the album as representing "a band reborn".

== Track listing ==
All tracks are written by P.O.D., except where noted.

No.	Title	Writer(s)	Length
1.	"Roots in Stereo" (featuring Matisyahu)	P.O.D.; Matisyahu	4:42
2.	"Lights Out"		2:47
3.	"If You Could See Me Now"		3:07
4.	"Goodbye for Now"		4:34
5.	"Sounds Like War"		3:53
6.	"On the Grind" (featuring Sick Jacken and Boo-Yaa T.R.I.B.E.)	P.O.D.; Sick Jacken; Boo Yaa T.R.I.B.E.; Glen Ballard; Joel Shearer	4:25
7.	"This Time"	P.O.D.; Ballard; Shearer	4:41
8.	"Mistakes & Glories"		3:38
9.	"Let You Down"		4:15
10.	"Teachers"		4:21
11.	"Strength of My Life" (featuring Matisyahu)	P.O.D.; Matisyahu; Ballard; Shearer	3:37
12.	"Say Hello"		2:32
13.	"Mark My Words" (featuring Sick Jacken)		3:43
Total length:			50:19

Bonus tracks
No.	Title	Length
14.	"Not Your Kind" (Japan bonus track)	2:37
15.	"Your Eyes" (Walmart exclusive bonus track)	4:23

Unreleased track
No.	Title	Length
1.	"Here We Go" (Previously unreleased but was put on Greatest Hits: The Atlantic Years)	3:28

Beyond Testify is also a limited edition second disc that features exclusive web content, commentaries for all the songs, and the following bonus tracks:

Beyond Testify
No.	Title	Length
1.	"Generation"	4:25
2.	"Bridge to Burn" (previously unreleased B-side from the Payable on Death sessions)	4:26
3.	"Will You" (Chris Vrenna Remix)	3:54
4.	"Every Time I Die" (demo)	3:31
5.	"New Wave" ("Let You Down" demo)	3:39

== Personnel ==
P.O.D.

- Sonny Sandoval – lead vocals
- Jason Truby – guitar, backing vocals on "Mistakes and Glories"
- Traa Daniels – bass guitar
- Wuv Bernardo – drums

Production

- Glen Ballard – production
- P.O.D. – production
- Chris Lord-Alge – mixing
- Keith Armstrong – assistant mixing
- Dmitar "Dim-e" Kmjaic – assistant mixing
- Ted Jensen – mastering
- Travis Wyrick – audio engineer
- Greg Fidelman – audio engineer
- William Malina – audio engineer
- Mike Kelley – drum technician

Additional personnel

- Jordan Orava – synthesizer
- Glen Ballard – programming, keyboards
- Matisyahu – guest vocals on "Roots on Stereo" and "Strength of My Life"
- Katy Perry – background vocals on "Goodbye for Now"
- Jonathan Davis was scheduled to perform backup vocals on the song "Mistakes and Glories" but could not be due to scheduling conflicts. Jason Truby recorded the sections left for Davis in his place.

== Charts ==
Chart performance for Testify
Chart (2006)	Peak position
Australian Albums (ARIA)	81
Austrian Albums (Ö3 Austria)	57
German Albums (Offizielle Top 100)	54
Swiss Albums (Schweizer Hitparade)	64
US Billboard 200	9
US Top Christian Albums (Billboard)	1
