= The Awakening (P.O.D. album) =

Studio album by P.O.D.
- Released: August 21, 2015
- Recorded: 2014–2015
- Studio: West Valley Studios; (Woodland Hills, California); Sparky Dark Studios; (Calabasas, California)
- Genre: Christian metal; alternative metal; nu metal; rap metal
- Length: 45:24
- Label: Universal, T-Boy
- Producer: Howard Benson

P.O.D. chronology
SoCal Sessions (2014)	The Awakening (2015)	Circles (2018)

Singles from The Awakening
- 1. "This Goes Out to You" Released: June 8, 2015

The Awakening is the ninth studio album by American nu metal band P.O.D. It was released on August 21, 2015. The album is unique in that it is the band's only concept album of their career, complete with skits and voiceovers before and after each song.

== Background ==
The Awakening had a music video for each song, and the group intended to release a full-length film which would tell the storyline behind the concept album. They were initially scheduled for release 2010, but due to issues with the record label, the film and videos were never made publicly available, and the album was delayed until 2015.

== Critical reception ==
Professional ratings
Review scores
Source	Rating
About.com	3.5/5 stars
AllMusic	4/5 stars
CCM Magazine	4/5 stars
Cross Rhythms	10/10 squares
HM Magazine	4/5 stars
Kerrang!	2/5 stars
New Release Today	4.5/5 stars

Doug Van Pelt, giving the album four stars for HM Magazine, writes, "When looking back at P.O.D.'s amazing career, there's probably going to be some landmark albums that stand out in most fan's minds... This one is not far behind." Awarding the album four out of five stars from CCM Magazine, Matt Conner states, they will "remain at the top", with Howard Benson's production, where it has the theme of a "central character coming to terms with his own mistakes...[giving the album] meaningful depth." Mary Nikkel, rating the album four and a half stars at New Release Today, says, "The Awakening easily one of the strongest rock releases of the year, a must-have for longtime fans and newcomers thirsty for some heavy music with substance." Indicating in a ten out of ten review at Cross Rhythms, replies, "An album likely to be eventually acknowledged as P.O.D.'s finest ever release." Chad Bowar, rating the album three stars from About.com, says, "P.O.D. fans will be intrigued by the wide variety of styles and the memorable songs on The Awakening."

== Track listing ==
All tracks are written by P.O.D.

No.	Title	Length
1.	"Am I Awake"	5:56
2.	"This Goes Out to You"	3:50
3.	"Rise of NWO"	3:12
4.	"Criminal Conversations" (featuring Maria Brink of In This Moment)	5:02
5.	"Somebody's Trying to Kill Me"	5:12
6.	"Get Down"	3:39
7.	"Speed Demon"	3:51
8.	"Want It All"	3:33
9.	"Revolución" (featuring Lou Koller of Sick of it All)	4:05
10.	"The Awakening"	7:04
Total length:		45:24

== Personnel ==
P.O.D.

- Sonny Sandoval – vocals
- Marcos Curiel – lead guitar
- Traa Daniels – bass
- Wuv Bernardo – drums, rhythm guitar

Additional musicians

- Lou Koller (Sick of It All) – guest vocals on "Revolución"
- Maria Brink (In This Moment) – guest vocals on "Criminal Conversations"
- Theodore Scott Smith – trumpet on "Want It All"

Production

- Howard Benson – producer, programming, keyboards
- Gavin Lurssen – mastering
- Reuben Cohen – mastering
- Jay Baumgardner – mixing
- Paul DiCarli – editing

== Charts ==
Chart (2015)	Peak position
US Billboard 200	75
US Top Christian Albums (Billboard)	3
US Top Hard Rock Albums (Billboard)	9
US Top Rock Albums (Billboard)	15
