= Raise It Up (album) =

Studio album by Stillwell
- Released: November 13, 2015
- Label: Rat Pak
- Producer: Chris Collier

Stillwell album chronology
Dirtbag (2011)	Raise It Up (2015)	Supernatural Miracle (2020)

Singles from Raise It Up
- 1. "Mess I Made" Released: October 1, 2015; 2. "Raise It Up" Released: November 5, 2015

Raise It Up is the second album by Stillwell. The album was released on November 13, 2015 through Rat Pak Records.

== Overview ==
Throughout 2014, the band later started demoing tracks and by the end of the year they began to refine their sound. The band signed with Rat Pak Records in 2015 and began working with producer Chris "Wizard" Collier. The band released a single for "Mess I Made" along with a music video on October 1, 2015. On November 5, 2015, the band released their music video under their eponymous album.

== Track listing ==
All lyrics are written by Chris "Wizard" Collier and Fieldy; all music is composed by Stillwell.

No.	Title	Length
1.	"Raise It Up"	3:28
2.	"Comin' Round"	2:31
3.	"Mess I Made"	3:31
4.	"Elephant in the Room"	2:49
5.	"Light 'Em Up"	2:59
6.	"Rug from Under Me"	3:04
7.	"Background, Front Row"	3:03
8.	"Eggshells"	3:09
9.	"No You Won't"	2:48
10.	"All City"	3:07
11.	"Take a Dive in the Fire"	3:49

== Charts ==
Chart (2015)	Peak position
US Billboard Top Rock Albums	38
US Billboard Top Independent Albums	25
US Billboard Heatseekers	4
US Billboard Top Hard Rock Albums	12

== Personnel ==
- Q-Unique - lead vocals
- Reginald "Fieldy" Arvizu - lead guitars
- Pablo "Spider" Silva - bass
- Noah "Wuv" Bernardo - drums, percussion

Additional personnel

- Chris "Wizard" Collier - producer, engineer, mixing
