= Dirtbag Clothing =

San Francisco-based apparel company

Dirtbag Clothing "Sheriff" Logo

Dirtbag Clothing is a San Diego–based clothing company, founded in 1996. Dirtbag manufactures various styles of clothing including streetwear, rock-n-roll and urban clothing, hoodies, flex-fits, women's tee-shirts/babydolls, and accessories. The company's business model relies heavily on internet sales, social media, and marketing. Dirtbag was projected to reach $1.4 million in sales as of 2004.

== History ==
Dirtbag Clothing was founded by partners Douglas Canning and John Alves during their final year as film majors at San Francisco State University. Instead of starting with a catalog like most clothing companies, Canning began with a website. From there, he went to the websites of independent record labels to get email addresses for bands that would fit his demographic and offered a 40% discount on those willing to wear their merchandise.

In October 2008, Dirtbag re-launched its clothing site and added Jim Stroesser as CEO. Stroesser previously held senior executive positions at Nike, Oakley, Quiksilver, Pony and Converse. In November 2008, Dirtbag began offering a wide variety of t-shirts, hoodies, and headwear.

In 2009, the company started Dirtbag Music- a record label led by owner partners Doug Whitsit and Mark Evans. The label became an overnight success when their first act, Seasons After, launched into the top 40 with the hit: "Cry Little Sister". Dirtbag Music then briefly partnered with Warner Independent Label Group as one of their subsidiaries. Dirtbag Music ceases to exist, and Dirtbag Clothing is no longer affiliated with Mark Evans.

== Revenues ==
Dirtbag Clothing had sales of approximately $1 million in 2002, half coming through online purchases. As of 2004, Dirtbag's revenues were projected at $1.4 million.

== Sponsors ==
Dirtbag Clothing sponsors include performers and bands in the metal scene, including Slipknot, Fear Factory, Jerry Cantrell, Drowning Pool, Shadows Fall, Black Label Society, Brand New Sin, Machine Head, Papa Roach and Hinder.
