= Circles (P.O.D. album) =

Studio album by P.O.D.
- Released: November 16, 2018
- Studios: Maples Studios (Santa Ana, California); Harley Studios (Costa Mesa, California)
- Genres: Nu metal; punk rock; hip-hop; hard rock
- Length: 37:10
- Label: Mascot
- Producer: The Heavy

P.O.D. chronology
The Awakening (2015)	Circles (2018)	Veritas (2024)

Singles from Circles
- 1. "Listening for the Silence" Released: October 9, 2018

Professional ratings
Review scores
Source	Rating
AllMusic	4/5 stars
CCM Magazine	4/5 stars
Indie Vision Music	3/5
Metal Revolution	55%

Circles is the tenth studio album by American Christian nu metal band P.O.D. The album was released on November 16, 2018, via Mascot Records. To promote the record, the band toured across the United States and Europe. It is the last album to feature the band's founding drummer Wuv Bernardo before his hiatus from the band in 2021.

== Background ==
In August 2017, the group released "Soundboy Killa" as a promotional single from the album. Later that year, the quartet travelled the United States and South America on the Soundboy Killaz with Powerflo, Alien Ant Farm and Fire from the Gods.

In September 2018, the ensemble released the title track "Circles", followed by "Listening for the Silence", which peaked at number 25 on the Billboard Mainstream Rock Songs chart.

The group worked on the record with Los Angeles production duo The Heavy, the most extensive collaboration the group has done.

The title of the album, possesses multiple meanings to lead vocalist Sonny Sandoval, who stated that "Part of the thought was, 'Man, is this new beginning for P.O.D., or is the beautiful end?'".

== Sound and composition ==
Blabbermouth.net stated that "The rap-driven "Rockin' With The Best" has an old-school P.O.D. sound that nods to the Beastie Boys, while "Always Southern California" is a reggae-inflected rocker and the groove-heavy "Soundboy Killa" is a hip-hop/metal hybrid", going on to say that "The dynamic title track even boasts moody electronic flourishes, glassy piano, and laid-back rapping verses".

== Promotion ==
On October 5, 2018, the band announced on Facebook a 23-city fall U.S. tour in support of their upcoming album called the "Full Circle" Tour, starting on November 14 at Marty's on Newport club and ending on December 12 at Greensboro's Cone Denim Entertainment Center. Nonpoint and Islander were supporting acts on the tour. On October 10, the band announced a co-headlining 2019 European tour with Alien Ant Farm, beginning on February 26 at Exeter's Lemon Grove venue and finishing on March 14 in Dublin's Button Factory. '68 were a supporting act on all dates.

== Track listing ==
All tracks are written by P.O.D.

Circles track listing
No.	Title	Length
1.	"Rockin' with the Best"	2:42
2.	"Always Southern California"	3:10
3.	"Circles"	3:27
4.	"Panic Attack"	3:02
5.	"On the Radio"	3:10
6.	"Fly Away"	3:10
7.	"Listening for the Silence"	3:51
8.	"Dreaming"	3:02
9.	"Domino"	3:29
10.	"Soundboy Killa"	4:06
11.	"Home"	4:01
Total length:		37:16

== Personnel ==
Credits adapted from the Circles booklet.

P.O.D.

- Sonny Sandoval – vocals
- Marcos Curiel – lead guitar
- Traa Daniels – bass guitar
- Wuv Bernardo – drums, rhythm guitar

Additional musicians

- Jordan Miller – synth on "Dreaming", sub bass on "Domino", backing vocals on "Circles", "Fly Away", "Domino", "Home", "Always Southern California" and "Panic Attack"
- Jason Bell – backing vocals on "Circles", "Fly Away", "Home", "Always Southern California" and "Panic Attack"
- Josh Collins – programming on "Circles"
- Timothy H. Miller – backing vocals on "Always Southern California"

Production

- The Heavy (Jordan Miller and Jason Bell) – production
- Cameron Webb – production on "Listening for the Silence" and "Soundboy Killa"
- Jay Baumgardner – mixing
- Howie Weinberg – mastering
- Blake Lagrange – engineering

Imagery

- Roy Koch – artwork

== Charts ==
Chart performance for Circles
Chart (2018)	Peak position
US Top Christian Albums (Billboard)	12
US Top Album Sales (Billboard)	93
