= When Angels & Serpents Dance =

Studio album by P.O.D.
- Released: April 8, 2008
- Studio: NRG Studios in North Hollywood, California
- Genre: Alternative metal; alternative rock
- Length: 51:26
- Label: INO/Columbia
- Producer: Jay Baumgardner, P.O.D.

P.O.D. studio album chronology
Greatest Hits: The Atlantic Years (2006)	When Angels & Serpents Dance (2008)	Murdered Love (2012)

2022 Remixed & Remastered cover

Singles from When Angels & Serpents Dance
- 1. "Addicted" Released: February 19, 2008; 2. "Shine with Me" Released: July 11, 2008

Professional ratings
Review scores
Source	Rating
AllMusic	4.5/5 stars
CBN	4/5 stars
CCM Magazine	4/5 stars
Christianity Today	3.5/5 stars
Cross Rhythms	8/10 stars
Drowned in Sound	4/10
Jesus Freak Hideout	2.5/5 stars 4.5/5 stars
PopMatters	4/10
Rolling Stone	2/5 stars
Spin	4/10

When Angels & Serpents Dance is the seventh studio album by Christian metal band P.O.D., released in 2008. It is the first album to include Marcos Curiel since Satellite and the only P.O.D. album released on Columbia. It also includes Mike Muir from Suicidal Tendencies, Helmet guitarist/vocalist Page Hamilton, guest Gospel Choir, and the Marley Sisters. The album debuted at number 9 on the Billboard 200, selling over 34,000 copies in its first week. It has sold over 200,000 copies worldwide so far. A remixed and remastered version of the album, relabeled under Mascot Records, was released on October 14, 2022.

== Pre-release ==
=== Performances ===
On June 1, 2007, at the ROCKBOX in San Diego, the band performed and revealed a new song entitled "Condescending", along with another new song performed on June 16, 2007, at the Journeys Backyard BBQ tour entitled "Addicted". They also revealed the title of their new album to be "When Angels & Serpents Dance".

On August 4, 2007 the band played at Angel Stadium of Anaheim's annual Harvest Crusade where they revealed a new song entitled "I'll Be Ready" for a crowd of 42,000, the largest number in attendance for the three-day event.

=== Cover artwork ===
On December 1, P.O.D. posted a blog on their MySpace that they had set up a "secret" website to reveal pieces of the cover to the public from December 3 – 10. P.O.D. also posted the lyrics to one of their songs on the "secret" website. They are as follows: "One must lead in the dance. Who's leading you? Life is real when angels and serpents dance."

In the early morning of December 10, 2007, in addition to the unveiling of the final pieces of the album cover, it was officially announced on P.O.D.'s "secret website" that When Angels & Serpents Dance would be released on April 8, 2008.

=== Website ===
For the better part of 2007, payableondeath.com, the main website for P.O.D., featured only a picture of the band with Marcos from the 2002 Still Payin' Dues DVD photoshoot, and a 30-second advertisement for Greatest Hits: The Atlantic Years. In a mass e-mail sent out in mid-December, the band announced that in conjunction with the 2008 New Year, a new website would be launched with an exclusive track from When Angels & Serpents Dance. On January 1, 2008, the website was updated and shows a video with a 30-second preview of the song "When Angels & Serpents Dance".

On January 25, 2008, a free download of the band's title song "When Angels & Serpents Dance" became available to the public.

== Track listing ==
All tracks are written by P.O.D.

No.	Title	Length
1.	"Addicted"	3:32
2.	"Shine with Me"	3:32
3.	"Condescending"	4:02
4.	"It Can't Rain Everyday"	4:42
5.	"Kaliforn-Eye-A" (featuring Mike Muir of Suicidal Tendencies)	4:29
6.	"I'll Be Ready" (featuring Cedella and Sharon Marley)	4:43
7.	"End of the World"	4:34
8.	"This Ain't No Ordinary Love Song"	3:43
9.	"God Forbid" (featuring Page Hamilton of Helmet)	3:55
10.	"Roman Empire"	2:42
11.	"When Angels & Serpents Dance"	3:16
12.	"Tell Me Why"	3:19
13.	"Rise Against"	4:52
Total length:		51:26

2008 bonus track
No.	Title	Length
14.	"Don't Fake It" (iTunes exclusive)	3:17

2022 Remixed & Remastered bonus tracks
No.	Title	Length
14.	"Don't Fake It"	3:14
15.	"Ridin' with You"	3:29
16.	"Walk on Water"	2:50
Total length:		60:59

== In other media ==
There are two songs featured in two different games:

- "Addicted" is used in the video game, WWE SmackDown vs. Raw 2009.
- "Condescending" is used in the video game, NASCAR 09.

== Personnel ==
P.O.D.

- Sonny Sandoval – lead vocals
- Wuv Bernardo – drums, rhythm guitar, backing vocals
- Traa Daniels – bass, backing vocals
- Marcos Curiel – lead guitar, glockenspiel, programming, backing vocals

Additional musicians

- Vocals (God Forbid): Page Hamilton (appears courtesy of Helmet)
- Vocals (Kaliforn-Eye-A): Mike Muir (appears courtesy of Suicidal Tendencies / Infectious Grooves)
- Background vocals (I’ll Be Ready): The Marley Girls
- Background vocals: Crystal Taliefero, Mark Renk
- Keyboards (Rise Against): Jason Freese
- Additional vocal production: Mark Renk
- Strings: Suzie Katayama
