= Payable on Death Live =

Live album by P.O.D.
- Released: February 18, 1997
- Recorded: 1997
- Venue: TomFest (Stevenson, Washington)
- Genres: Nu metal; rap metal; hardcore punk
- Label: Rescue
- Producer: P.O.D.

P.O.D. chronology
Brown (1996)	Payable on Death Live (1997)	The Warriors EP (1998)

Payable on Death Live by American Christian nu metal band P.O.D. was released in 1997 as their third and final album on their own label, Rescue Records. Their first live album, it was recorded at the TomFest concert in 1997. The album was remastered and rereleased in 2001 by Rescue Records.

Notable tracks on the album include "Punk-Reggae Jam" featuring Russell Castilo of Dogwood.

== Track listing ==
Original release
No.	Title	Length
1.	"One Day"	5:11
2.	"Draw the Line"	3:06
3.	"Selah"	5:08
4.	"Know Me"	4:04
5.	"Punk-Reggae Jam" (featuring Russel Castillo of Dogwood)	3:10
6.	"Breathe Babylon" (featuring Dirt)	6:27
7.	"Preach"	3:03
8.	"Full Color"	6:45
9.	"Murder"	2:16

Remastered track listing
No.	Title	Length
1.	"One Day"	5:11
2.	"Draw the Line"	3:07
3.	"Selah"	4:14
4.	"Know Me"	4:43
5.	"Punk-Reggae Jam" (featuring Russel Castillo of Dogwood)	3:10
6.	"Breathe Babylon" (featuring Dirt)	6:27
7.	"Preach"	3:03
8.	"Full Color/1-800-HIT-HOME/Murder"	16:26

Notes

- The track "Draw the Line" was written by Tim Gonzalez of the San Diego rapcore group House of Suffering.
- On the original release, "Murder" was track 9. On the re-release, "1-800-HIT-HOME" and "Murder" are both at the end of track 8. "1-800-HIT-HOME" is not actually a song, but a message from Noah Bernardo Sr. (father of Wuv Bernardo and owner of Rescue Records). It has information about believing in and receiving Christ, and about "1-800-HIT-HOME".
