= Murdered Love =

Studio album by P.O.D.
- Released: July 10, 2012
- Recorded: 2011–2012
- Studios: Bay 7 Studios, Valley Village, Sparky Dark Studio, Calabasas
- Genres: Alternative metal; nu metal; rap metal
- Length: 40:45
- Label: Razor & Tie
- Producer: Howard Benson

P.O.D. chronology
| Rhapsody Originals (2008) | Murdered Love (2012) | SoCal Sessions (2014) |

P.O.D. studio album chronology
| When Angels & Serpents Dance (2008) | Murdered Love (2012) | SoCal Sessions (2014) |

Singles from Murdered Love
- 1. "Lost in Forever (Scream)" Released: April 17, 2012; 2. "Higher" Released: October 30, 2012; 3. "Beautiful" Released: April 30, 2013

Murdered Love is the eighth studio album by American Christian metal band P.O.D., released on July 10, 2012. It debuted on the Billboard 200 at No. 17 with sales of over 16,000 in its first week in the U.S. Murdered Love is the follow-up to When Angels & Serpents Dance and it sees the band reunited with long-time producer Howard Benson who also produced the band's The Fundamental Elements of Southtown, Satellite and Payable on Death albums. Prior to the album's official release, three songs were made available for download, all were recorded with producer and engineer Blake La Grange; two of which, "Eyez" and a demo version of "On Fire", available for free on the band's website. The album features guest appearances from Hatebreed's Jamey Jasta, Cypress Hill's Sen Dog, and Psycho Realm's Sick Jacken. A deluxe edition of the album, featuring acoustic and bonus tracks, was released on October 22, 2013.

"Lost in Forever (Scream)", the album's lead single, charted at No. 12 on the mainstream rock charts, No. 1 on Active Rock, and No. 1 on Christian Rock. The music video was released on May 14, 2012 and has since received over 3,300,000 views. The second single, "Higher", was released in late October and "Beautiful", the third and final single from Murdered Love, was released in March.

A sample of "West Coast Rock Steady", the fifth track off the album with Sen Dog of Cypress Hill, was featured on ESPN. The song "Beautiful" was featured on an episode of the Comedy Central television show Workaholics.

On July 3, the band premiered the "Murdered Love" video directed by Ramon Boutviseth.

== Singles ==
"Lost in Forever (Scream)" is the lead single and peaked at No. 26 on the US Rock Songs chart, No. 30 on the US Alternative Songs chart, and No. 3 on the US Mainstream Rock chart. The music video debuted on May 14.

== Critical reception ==
Professional ratings
Aggregate scores
| Source | Rating |
|---|---|
| Metacritic | 58/100 |
Review scores
| Source | Rating |
| About.com | 4/5 stars |
| AllMusic | 4/5 stars |
| CCM Magazine | 3/5 stars |
| Christianity Today | 3/5 stars |
| Cross Rhythms | 10/10 stars |
| Jesus Freak Hideout | 2/5 stars 4/5 stars |
| Revolver | 3.5/5 stars |
| Rock Sound | 6/10 |
| Spin | 3/10 |
| Sputnikmusic | 4/5 stars |

According to the review aggregator Metacritic, Murdered Love received "mixed or average reviews" based on a weighted average score of 58 out of 100 from 4 critic scores. At Revolver, Mikael Wood rated the album three-and-a-half stars out of five, and wrote that the material was good when the boisterous songs have "infectious grooves" accompanying them. Ryan Bird of Rock Sound rated the album six out of ten, and they called the end product "genuinely respectable." At CCM Magazine, Matt Conner rated the album three stars, and evoked that the group "finally shines". Robert Ham of Christianity Today rated it three stars, and wrote that after the listener becomes accustomed to the material that the "journey provides thrills and deep wells of emotion." At Spin, Christopher R. Weingarten rated the album three out of ten, and touched on that the album was "Preachy Left Behind Rapture sermonizing set to rhythms and sound effects from late-'90s car crash movies."

Matt Collar of AllMusic rated the album four stars, and felt that the music "play[s] with Christian themes, often in a dark, purposefully disturbing way." At Cross Rhythms, Tony Cummings rated it a perfect ten, and proclaimed the album to be "Amazing stuff." The two Jesus Freak Hideout reviews were in divergence of one another with Michael Weaver rating it two stars in the main review, while the second given by Cortney Warner rated it at four stars. Weaver said his rating was because the song "I Am" had several bleeped out uses of the "F" word, and "sadly skews the entire album." Also, Warner noted the same gripe, but said if fans could look beyond that they will "find some gems on here." At New Release Tuesday, Mary Nikkel rated the album four-and-a-half stars, and stated the music will garner new fans because "the blend of theologically heavy and more feel-good tracks". Lee Brown of Indie Vision Music rated the album four stars, and stated that his reviewed copy did not have "I Am", but called the release a "worthy addition". At About.com, Chad Bowar rated the album four stars, and claimed the album had a "resounding message" on which the band was "back and better than ever." Magnus Altkula of Sputnikmusic rated the album four out of five, and stated the album was "solid" that proves why the band is still around after all these years.

== Track listing ==
All lyrics are written by Sonny Sandoval; all music is composed by P.O.D.

| No. | Title | Length |
|---|---|---|
| 1. | "Eyez" (featuring Jamey Jasta of Hatebreed) | 2:47 |
| 2. | "Murdered Love" (featuring Sick Jacken of Psycho Realm) | 3:45 |
| 3. | "Higher" | 3:22 |
| 4. | "Lost in Forever" | 4:06 |
| 5. | "West Coast Rock Steady" (featuring Sen Dog of Cypress Hill) | 3:05 |
| 6. | "Beautiful" | 3:53 |
| 7. | "Babylon the Murderer" | 4:19 |
| 8. | "On Fire" | 3:44 |
| 9. | "Bad Boy" | 3:18 |
| 10. | "Panic & Run" | 3:16 |
| 11. | "I Am" | 5:10 |
| Total length: | | 40:45 |

iTunes exclusive
| No. | Title | Length |
|---|---|---|
| 12. | "Lost in Forever (Scream)" (Music video) | 4:19 |
| 13. | "Lost in Forever (Scream)" (Making of the video) | 3:58 |

Japan bonus track
| No. | Title | Length |
|---|---|---|
| 12. | "Find a Way" | 2:54 |

Deluxe Edition
| No. | Title | Length |
|---|---|---|
| 12. | "Burn It Down" | 3:18 |
| 13. | "Find a Way" | 2:53 |
| 14. | "Beautiful (Acoustic Version)" | 3:57 |
| 15. | "West Coast Rock Steady (Acoustic Version)" | 3:19 |
| 16. | "On Fire (Chris Blackwood Mix)" | 3:39 |
| 17. | "Lost in Forever (Scream)" | 4:05 |
| Total length: | | 56:46 |

- An edited version of the album omitting track 11 ("I Am") was released to Christian stores. The purpose behind the deletion is the line "I know you are the one and only son of god, but tell me, who the fuck is he?" The word "fuck" is backmasked on the song. The song also contains the line "Since I'm a little strange, my daddy called me a faggot".

== Personnel ==
P.O.D.

- Sonny Sandoval − lead vocals
- Wuv Bernardo − drums, percussion, rhythm guitar, backing vocals
- Traa Daniels − bass, backing vocals
- Marcos Curiel − lead guitar, glockenspiel, programming, backing vocals

Additional musicians

- Jamey Jasta (Hatebreed) − guest vocals on "Eyez"
- Sick Jacken (Psycho Realm) − guest vocals on "Murdered Love"
- Sen Dog (Cypress Hill) − guest vocals on "West Coast Rock Steady"

Technical personnel

- Howard Benson − production, keyboards, programming
- Mike Plotnikoff − recording
- Hatsukazu "Hatch" Inagaki − additional engineering
- Paul DeCarli − additional engineering, digital editing
- Jay Baumgardner − mixing at NRG Studios, North Hollywood, California
- Brad Blackwood − mastering at Euphonic Masters, Memphis, Tennessee
- Jordan Feldstein and Rich Egan (CAM8 Management) − management
- Ron Opaleski and Brian Ahern (William Morris Endeavor) and Mark Claassen (Elite Talent Agency) − booking agents
- Tom Reed (Affiliated Financial Service) − business management
- Danny Hayes and Jeff Leven (Davis, Shapiro, Lewit & Hayes, LLP) − legal representation
- Pete Giberga & Rene Mata − A&R
- John Franck − marketing direction
- Jeff Chenault − creative direction
- Invisible Creature − art direction
- Ryan Clark (Invisible Creature) − design, illustration
- LeAnn Mueller − photography
- Bryn Carter − styling

== Charts ==
All chart data for Billboard (North America)

=== Album ===
| Chart (2012) | Peak position |
|---|---|
| US Billboard 200 | 17 |
| US Top Christian Albums | 1 |
| US Top Rock Albums | 2 |
| US Top Alternative Albums | 2 |
| US Top Hard Rock Albums | 2 |

=== Singles ===
| Year | Single | Chart | Position |
|---|---|---|---|
| 2012 | "Lost in Forever (Scream)" | US Mainstream Rock | 3 |
| 2012 | "Lost in Forever (Scream)" | US Alternative | 30 |
| 2012 | "Higher" | US Mainstream Rock | 12 |
| 2013 | "Beautiful" | US Mainstream Rock | 5 |
| 2013 | "Beautiful" | US Alternative | 38 |
