= Rescue Records =

American record label

- Founded: 1994
- Founder: Noah Bernardo Sr.
- Distributor: Syntax Creative
- Genre: Rapcore; hip hop; hardcore punk; metalcore
- Country of origin: USA
- Location: San Diego, California

Rescue Records was created by P.O.D. drummer Wuv Bernardo's father and Sonny Sandoval's uncle, Noah Bernardo Sr. It is most notable for being the label that started multi-platinum band P.O.D. and is currently distributed by Syntax Creative, a distributor owned by a former artist of Rescue Records.

== Divisions ==
- Root Records

=== Active ===
- FASEDOWN (currently on Hemrocrit Records)
- P.O.D. (currently on T-Boy Records)
- Tonéx
- Dj Skillspinz
- The Pride

=== Disbanded ===
- Point Of Recognition

=== Hiatus or Unknown ===
- Dogwood
- N.I.V.
- JeremiahDirt
- Fros'T
- Unity Klan
- E-Roc
- Sackcloth Fashion
- Nailed Promise
- Ancient of Days
- Skratchline
- BLAH (Born Lost And Hopeless)

=== Former ===
- Xodus

== Compilations ==
- Urban Soldiers
- Sonic Imperial
- "Now the tables have turned" 3 way split compilation released on Rescue Records, bands featured are: Point of Recognition, Cast in Stone, and Torn in Two
