= Sonny Sandoval =

American rapper and singer (born 1974)

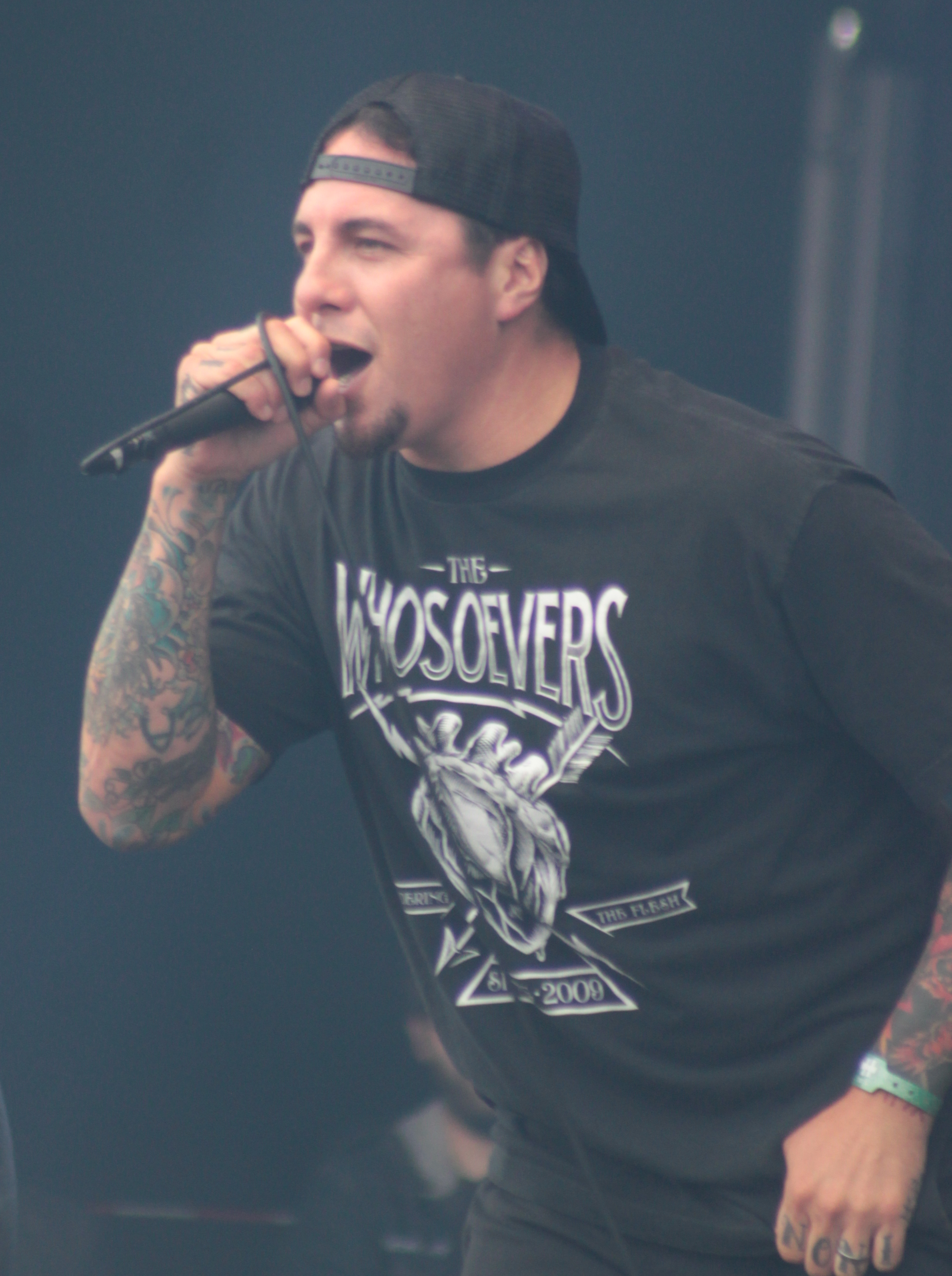
- Sandoval performing in 2013

Background information
- Born: Paul Joshua Sandoval; May 16, 1974 (age 52); San Diego, California, U.S.
- Genres: Nu metal; Christian metal; rap metal; alternative metal
- Occupations: Rapper; singer; songwriter
- Years active: 1992–present
- Member of: P.O.D.

Paul Joshua "Sonny" Sandoval (born May 16, 1974) is an American rapper and singer who is the lead vocalist and a founding member of nu metal band P.O.D.

== Early life ==
Sandoval was born in San Diego, California. When he was eighteen, his mother was diagnosed with leukemia. During her illness, he was greatly influenced by his mother's faith as a devout Christian. Despite being labeled a Christian band, Sandoval has stated that the band members came to their own terms and was unaware of a Christian rock band until after having started playing.

== Career ==
=== P.O.D. ===
Sandoval is best known as co-founder and the lead vocalist of the metal band P.O.D. Over the course of their career, the band has received three Grammy Award nominations, contributed to numerous motion picture soundtracks and toured internationally. They have sold over 12 million records worldwide. With their third studio album, The Fundamental Elements of Southtown, P.O.D. achieved their initial mainstream success; the album was certified platinum by the RIAA in 2000.

=== The Whosoevers ===
Since 2008, Sandoval has been part of an outreach group, The Whosoevers, with Ryan Ries, Lacey Sturm of Flyleaf, and Brian Welch, guitarist for the nu metal band Korn.

== Kill the Noise Tour ==
Sonny Sandoval, lead singer of P.O.D. and Ryan Ries have started a tour with The Whosoevers called “Kill The Noise Tour”. This tour visits high schools around the nation to reach the youth and target youth depression. They do this by having live music and skateboarding demonstrations to engage youth. Through these events they hope to empower the younger generation to fight against their mental struggles.

=== Other work ===
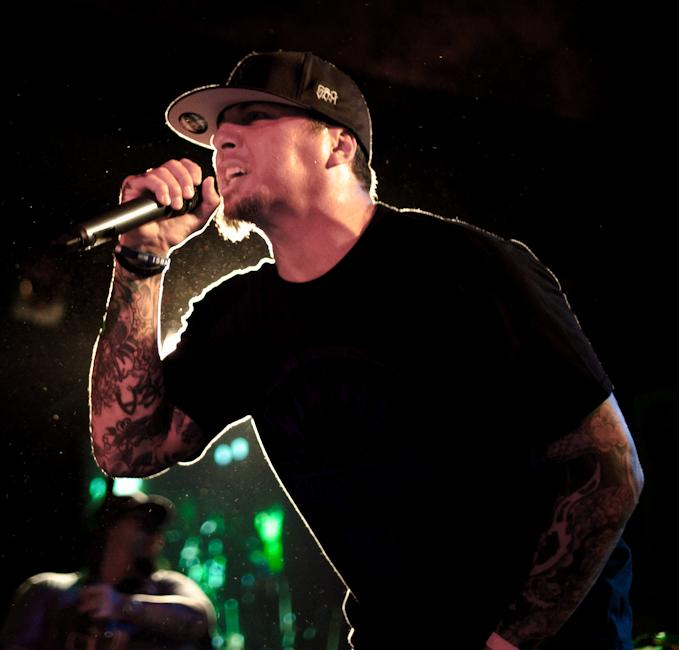
Sandoval performing in 2011

Before the formation of P.O.D., Sandoval was a member of a rap/hip-hop group in high school called Unlicensed Product.

Sandoval appeared in Project 86's self-titled album in the song "Six Sirens". In 2004, he contributed to two tracks on Anastacia's self titled album, "Seasons Change" and "I Do". He has been named number 63 in Hit Parader's Top 100 Metal Vocalists of All Time in 2006.

Sandoval published autobiography Son of Southtown on February 25, 2025. Later that year, on December 11th, 2025, he debuted his first solo album, titled Sonny Dread.

== New Music ==
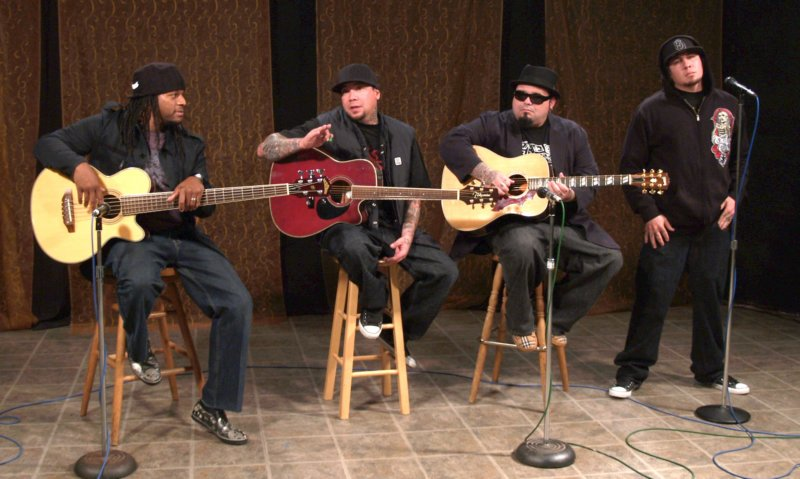
P.O.D.

On November 13, 2025 the lead vocalist of P.O.D. broke away from his rock and roll roots and started a solo project. This project was titled Sonny Dread, the song sleeping lion was taken notice of as it is one of the more popular songs on the new release. This was a different approach from Sonny Sandoval but many people took a liking to it. He performed his first show under the new Sonny Dread title at the Santa Ana Observatory alongside Playuh and Aurora wave

=== Legacy ===
In 2023, the City of San Diego declared June 23 to be "Sonny Sandoval Day," meant to honor the vocalist.

== Personal life ==
He and his wife Shannon married in 1996, and have two daughters and a son. He resides in San Diego.

For most of P.O.D.'s career, Sandoval was well known for his dreadlocks (which, by the release of the video for "Going in Blind", reached his waist). At the time of the release of P.O.D.'s seventh studio album, When Angels & Serpents Dance, he cut them off, but has since regrown them.

== Discography ==
=== P.O.D. ===
- Snuff the Punk (1994)
- Brown (1996)
- The Fundamental Elements of Southtown (1999)
- Satellite (2001)
- Payable on Death (2003)
- Testify (2006)
- When Angels & Serpents Dance (2008)
- Murdered Love (2012)
- SoCal Sessions (2014)
- The Awakening (2015)
- Circles (2018)
- Veritas (2024)

=== Solo work ===
- Sonny Dread (2025)

=== Guest appearances ===
- "Six Sirens" by Project 86 on the album Project 86 (1998)
- "America" by Santana (with P.O.D.) on the album Shaman (2002)
- "Seasons Change" & "I Do" by Anastacia on the album, Anastacia (2004)
- "Let It Go" by Kirk Franklin, with TobyMac on the album, Hero (2005)
- "Warning" by Tribal Seeds on their album, The Harvest (2009)
- "Eternal" by War of Ages on their album, Eternal (2010)
- "Children of the Light" by Lecrae on his album, Rehab (2010)
- "American Dream" by Dominic Balli on his album, American Dream (2011)
- "The Only Name" by For Today on their album, Immortal (2012)
- "Something Better" Flyleaf on their EP, Who We Are (2013)
- "Criminals" by Islander on their album, Violence & Destruction (2014)
- "Chasing the Horizon" by Noize MC (2019)
- "They Don't Like It" by Fire from the Gods (2019)
- "Secrets" by Written By Wolves (2019)
- "Magic Eyes" by Nights Like Thieves (2020)
- "All or Nothing" by Ill Niño (2021)
- "Nemesis" by Manafest (2022)
- "Lights, Camera, Action" by Islander (2022)
- "Attitude" by H.R. on his album "Let Luv Lead (The Way)" (2023)
- "Resurrected" by Guilt Trip (2026)
