= P.O.D. =

American nu metal band

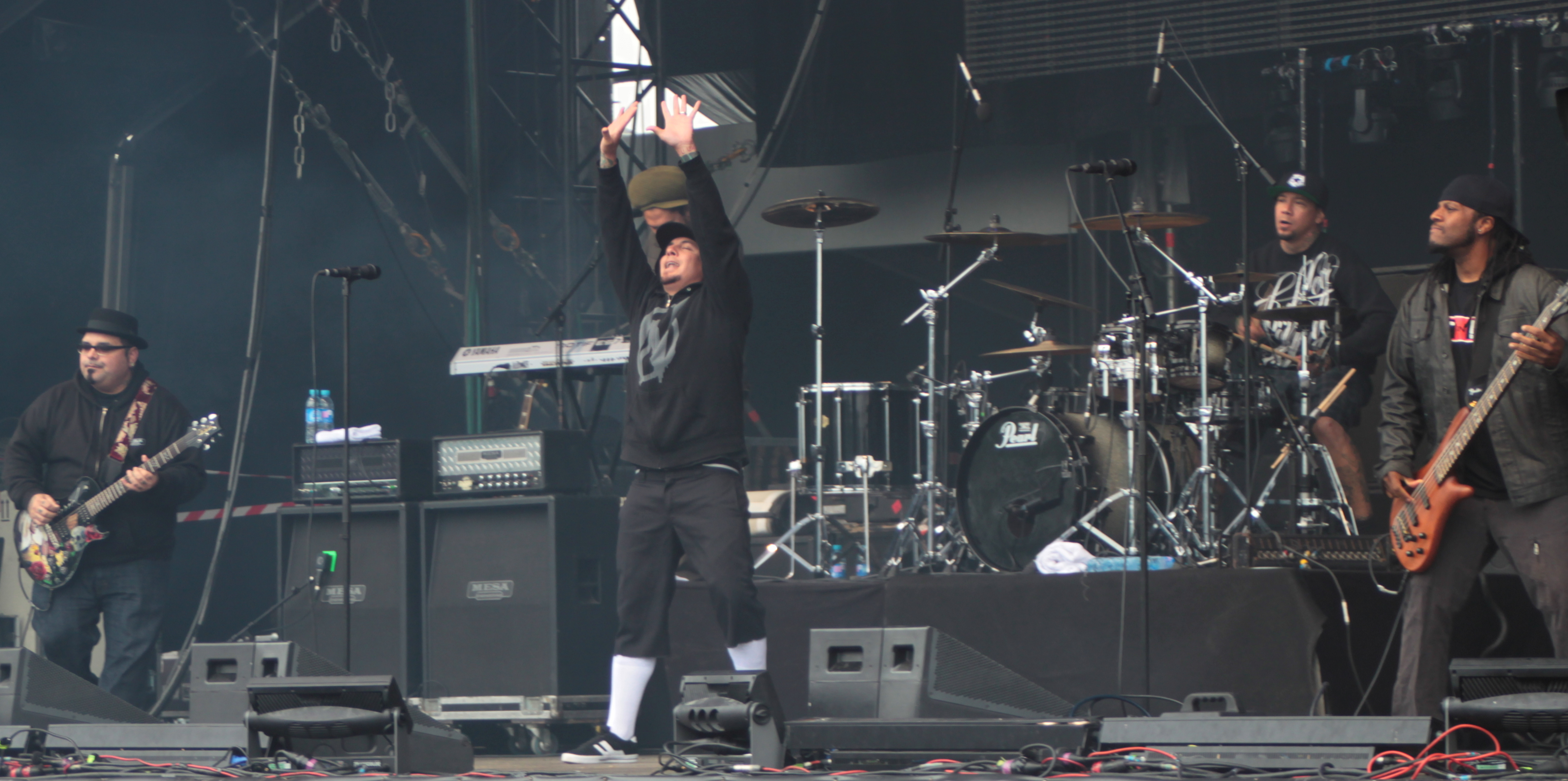
- P.O.D. at Hellfest 2013

Background information
- Also known as: Payable on Death
- Origin: San Diego, California, U.S.
- Genres: Nu metal; rap rock; alternative metal; Christian metal; hardcore punk (early)
- Works: P.O.D. discography
- Years active: 1992–present
- Labels: Rescue; Atlantic; Columbia/INO; Razor & Tie; Tooth & Nail; Mascot
- Spinoff of: Eschatos
- Members: Sonny Sandoval; Traa Daniels; Marcos Curiel; Zachary Christopherr
- Past members: Jason Truby; Gabe Portillo; Wuv Bernardo
- Website: payableondeath.com

P.O.D. (an initialism for Payable on Death) is an American Christian nu metal band formed in 1992 and based in San Diego, California. The band's line-up consists of vocalist Paul Joshua "Sonny" Sandoval, bassist Mark "Traa" Daniels, guitarist Marcos Curiel, and drummer Zachary Christopherr. They have sold over 12 million records worldwide.

Over the course of their career, the band has received three Grammy Award nominations, contributed to numerous motion picture soundtracks and toured internationally. With their third studio album, The Fundamental Elements of Southtown, they achieved their initial mainstream success; the album was certified platinum by the RIAA in 2000. Their following studio album, Satellite, continued the band's success with the singles, "Alive" and "Youth of the Nation", pushing it to go triple platinum.

== History ==
=== Early years (1991–1993) ===
In 1991 as a precursor to P.O.D., Sonny Sandoval fronted a rap/hip-hop group called Unlicensed Product, while Wuv Bernardo, Marcos Curiel and Gabe Portillo were in a thrash metal band called Eschatos. In 1992, following the split of Unlicensed Product, the three members of Eschatos recruited Sandoval on vocals. They renamed the group to Payable on Death, a banking-term pitched by Bernardo's girlfriend who worked in a bank at the time. The name was later shortened to P.O.D.

The band chose this name to be a direct tie in with the Christian theology that explains that since Jesus died on the Cross, Christians' debts to God have been paid; in other words, all believers in their acceptance that Jesus was sacrificed for them on God's behalf have inherited eternal life.

They recorded their first song that year, "Three In the Power of One", which was later included on their debut studio album Snuff the Punk.

=== Snuff the Punk and Brown (1994–1998) ===
After recording a demo tape, Traa Daniels joined the band in 1994 when they needed a bassist for some shows to replace Portillo. P.O.D. signed with Rescue Records, a label created by Bernardo's father, Noah Bernardo Sr., who was also the band's first manager. Between 1994 and 1997, they released three albums under the label, Snuff the Punk, Brown and Payable on Death Live. Longtime manager Tim Cook was first introduced to the band when he booked them to play his club The Where-House in Bartlesville, Oklahoma, following strong local word of mouth support. He later described their performance by saying: "I stood at the back of the venue with tears in my eyes – it was the greatest thing I had ever seen." By that point, Bernardo Sr. was looking for someone else to take P.O.D.'s career further and so Cook took over as manager.

Shortly after the release of Payable on Death Live, Essential Records offered P.O.D. a $100,000 recording contract, but on behalf of the band Sandoval told band manager Tim Cook to decline the offer because, "God has a bigger plan for P.O.D." When, in 1998, Atlantic Records A&R John Rubeli first came across P.O.D.'s demo he "didn't quite get it", as he later told HitQuarters. It was only when he saw them play live at The Roxy on the Sunset Strip. The band was quickly signed to a major-label deal. P.O.D. soon released The Warriors EP, a tribute EP to their loyal fans as a transitional album from Rescue Records to Atlantic Records.

=== The Fundamental Elements of Southtown and Satellite (1999–2002) ===
P.O.D.'s third studio album, 1999's The Fundamental Elements of Southtown, spawned the hits "Southtown" and "Rock the Party (Off the Hook)", which was their first video to reach No. 1 on MTV's Total Request Live. The song "School of Hard Knocks" was featured on the soundtrack for Little Nicky while both "Southtown" and "Rock the Party" appeared in the movie. All three music videos enjoyed heavy play on MTV2, and the songs were rock radio hits. The album went on to become RIAA certified platinum.

On September 11, 2001, P.O.D. released their fourth studio album, Satellite. The album's first single, "Alive", went on to become one of MTV's and MTV2's top played videos of the year. The video's popularity, as well as the song's positive message, helped the song become a huge modern rock radio hit, and it was Grammy-nominated for Best Hard Rock Performance in 2002. Also in 2002, the band contributed the song "America" to Santana's album Shaman.

The album's second single, "Youth of the Nation", was influenced in part by the school shootings at Santana High School, Columbine High School, and Granite Hills High School. It was Grammy nominated for Best Hard Rock Performance in 2003. The 2002 singles, "Boom" and "Satellite", also became quite popular. In addition, the concluding track of the album, "Portrait," was Grammy nominated for Best Metal Performance in 2003. "Boom" was used in, and part of its lyrics the title of, the comedy film Here Comes the Boom, starring Kevin James.

Satellite went on to become RIAA-certified triple platinum. The author of Encyclopedia of Contemporary Christian Music has described P.O.D. as "one of the biggest success stories in recent Christian music".

=== Payable on Death and Testify (2003–2006) ===
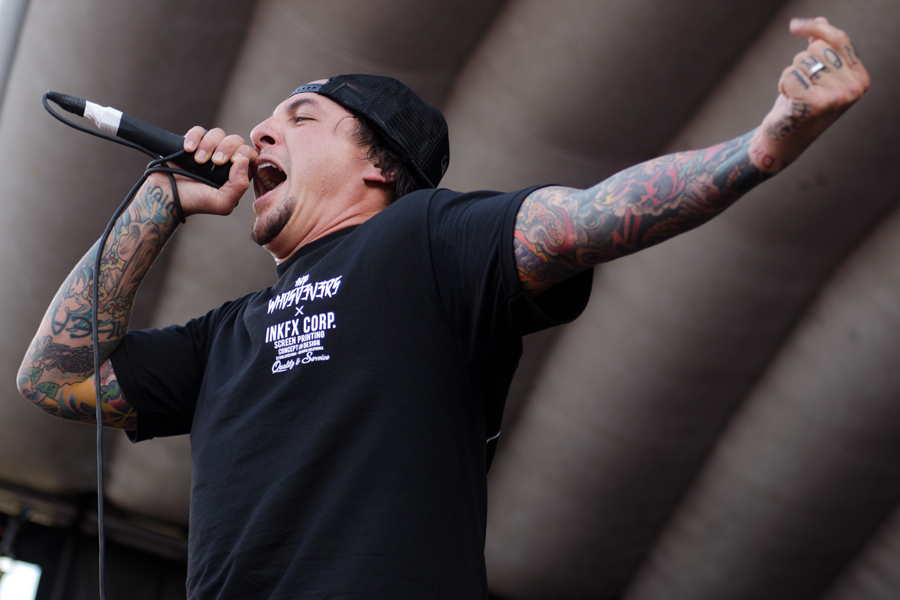
Sonny Sandoval at Uproar Festival 2012

On February 19, 2003, guitarist Curiel left the band due to his side project, The Accident Experiment, and "spiritual differences." However, Curiel claimed that he was actually kicked out of the band. Curiel was replaced by Jason Truby, former member of Christian metal band Living Sacrifice, and assisted with the recording of "Sleeping Awake", from The Matrix Reloaded soundtrack. In an interview with Yahoo! Music, Sandoval stated that Truby is the reason why the group is still together. On November 4, 2003, P.O.D. released their fifth studio album, Payable on Death, which saw the group shift from their well-known rapcore sound to a darker, more melodic metal sound. The album was hit with controversy due to its "occult" cover, which led as many as 85% of Christian bookstores across the United States to ban the album. With the help of the album's hit single "Will You" and "Change the World", it went on to sell over 520,000 copies and was certified Gold.

P.O.D.'s sixth studio album, Testify, was slated for a December 2005 release, but was pushed back to January 24, 2006. On November 15, 2005, P.O.D. released The Warriors EP, Volume 2, which featured demos from the upcoming album, to help build up the fans' anticipation for the pending January release. The album's first single, "Goodbye for Now" (with a vocal tag by a then-unknown Katy Perry) went on to become a No. 1 video on MTV's TRL; along with having a solid radio presence, it also became the band's unprecedented 4th number one video on Total Request Live. The second single off the album, "Lights Out" was a minor hit, but was featured as the official theme song to WWE's Survivor Series 2005. In another contribution to WWE, they performed fellow San Diego native Rey Mysterio's theme song "Booyaka 619" at WrestleMania 22. To promote their latest album, P.O.D. went on a nationwide tour called the "Warriors Tour 2: Guilty by Association", which began in April, and included the bands Pillar, The Chariot and Maylene and the Sons of Disaster.

On August 11, 2006, P.O.D. announced in their online newsletter that they had left Atlantic Records. On September 16, 2006, P.O.D. announced that they had teamed up with Rhino Records to release a greatest hits record simply titled, Greatest Hits: The Atlantic Years, which was released on November 21, 2006. They shot a music video for their single "Going In Blind", one of the two new songs they included in the tenth album, and they had meetings with various record labels to begin working on new material for an album they hoped to release in mid-2007.

=== When Angels & Serpents Dance (2007–2009) ===
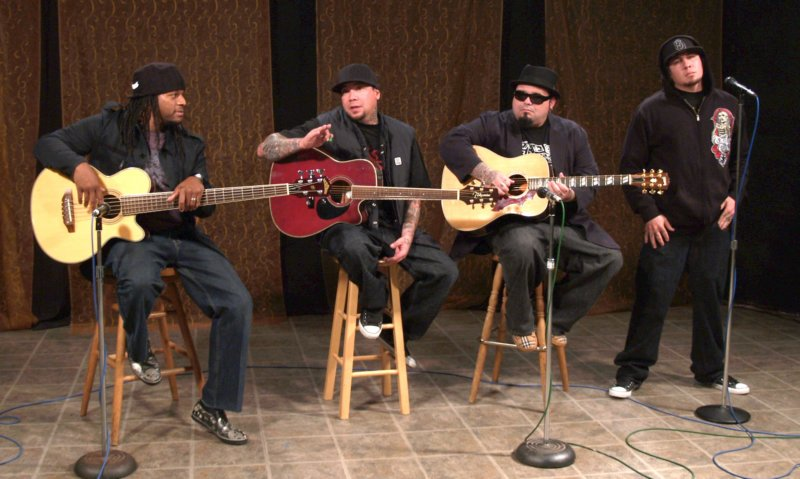
P.O.D. in 2008, from left to right: Traa Daniels, Wuv Bernardo, Marcos Curiel and Sonny Sandoval

In a statement made by the band's manager on their MySpace page, it was officially announced, on December 30, 2006, that Jason Truby had left the band. They had said "God worked it out because Truby decided to leave the band the same day Curiel asked to rejoin." Curiel performed with the band for the first time since his departure on the 2006 New Year's Eve episode of Jimmy Kimmel Live!.

On February 2, 2007, the band made a new record deal with INO Records.

On June 1, 2007, at the Rockbox in San Diego, the band performed and revealed a new song entitled "Condescending", along with another new song performed on June 16, 2007, at the Journeys Backyard BBQ tour entitled "Addicted". They also revealed the title of their new album to be When Angels & Serpents Dance. On August 4, 2007, the band played at Angel Stadium of Anaheim's annual Harvest Crusade for a crowd of 42,000, where they revealed a new song, "I'll Be Ready", originally thought to be titled "When Babylon Come for I".

The album cover was officially revealed on December 10, 2007. The title track was released for free download on their site in January 2008. The first single "Addicted" was released on February 19 and peaked at No. 30 on the Mainstream Rock chart. The album was released on April 8, 2008, entitled When Angels & Serpents Dance. On July 28, 2008, the group played a free public performance at the Orange County Choppers headquarters in Newburgh, NY, with OCC The Band opening. The band also played on August 16, 2008, at the Angel Stadium of Anaheim's annual Harvest Crusade. During September 2008, P.O.D. played alongside Redline, Behind Crimson Eyes, Alter Bridge, and Disturbed as part of the Music As a Weapon tour 2008 in Australia.

=== Murdered Love (2010–2013) ===
The band headlined the first annual Spring Jam Fest in May 2011. They appeared on the Rock of Allegiance tour later that summer. On July 25, 2011, the band released a demo of the song "On Fire" as a free download on their official website.

In October 2011, P.O.D. announced a multi-album artist deal with Razor & Tie. On April 5, 2012, the song "Eyez" became a free download on the band's website for a limited time. Shortly after, an article on their website stated that "Lost in Forever" would be the first single from the new album, entitled Murdered Love.

Murdered Love was originally going to be released in June 2012, but was instead pushed back to July 10. The album was produced by Howard Benson, who also produced Satellite and The Fundamental Elements of Southtown. It was described by Curiel as "Back to our roots. A little bit of hip hop, a little bit of punk rock, or reggae". The album caused controversy concerning its eleventh track, "I Am", which uses the word "fuck" (albeit backmasked). Sandoval said he struggled with the idea of releasing the song, but ultimately decided it could help spread a message of hope: "I don't write music for Christians. I don't write music for people that I believe are saved and going to heaven. [...] Ultimately we're trying to reach people fed up with religion that are sick and tired of it, and people that are in the real world that really are lost and confused." The band went on tour with Shinedown and Three Days Grace as an opening act.

In a 2012 interview with Broken Records Magazine, Sandoval said that the band had to get their lives back in order and take care of personal needs before getting back into music, but was extremely happy about the response the band was getting from fans.

In September 2013, the band was featured in an NME article titled "28 Nu-Metal Era Bands You Probably Forgot All About". One month later on October 22, 2013, P.O.D. released a deluxe edition of Murdered Love. The album contains the original songs, slightly remixed, along with bonus tracks "Find a Way", "Burn It Down", acoustic versions of "Beautiful" and "West Coast Rock Steady", a remixed version of "On Fire", and music videos for "Murdered Love", "Beautiful", "Higher", and "Lost In Forever". Multiple behind the scenes videos were also on the track list.

=== SoCal Sessions, Circles, and Wuv Bernardo's hiatus (2014–2024) ===
In mid-2014, P.O.D. announced an acoustic album to be released toward the end of the year. The album was crowd-funded on the website PledgeMusic. On October 20, 2014, P.O.D. announced a new record deal with T-Boy Records along with a new acoustic album. SoCal Sessions was released on November 17, 2014, and contained songs such as "Alive" and "Youth of the Nation".

The band followed that release with another studio album, The Awakening, released on August 21, 2015, which was produced by Howard Benson, with guest vocalists such as Maria Brink of In This Moment and Lou Koller of Sick of It All.

On May 17, 2016, the band announced that they would be taking part in the Make America Rock Again super tour throughout the summer and fall 2016. The tour featured a number of artists who had success throughout the 2000s.

On August 18, 2017, the band released a new song, "Soundboy Killa", and embarked on a fall tour promoting the song.

In January 2018, it was announced that the band had signed a new record deal with Mascot Records. They toured alongside Alien Ant Farm, Lit, and Buckcherry on the "Gen-X Tour" in 2018. Their tenth studio album, Circles, was released on November 16, 2018.

In 2021, the band embarked on a major tour celebrating the 20th anniversary of Satellite with From Ashes to New and All Good Things, starting in Sturgis, South Dakota at Buffalo Chip on August 14, 2021, and ending on October 7, 2021, at the House of Blues in San Diego, California. During the European leg of the tour, drummer Wuv Bernardo dropped out to "take care of business at home", and ceased touring and appearing in public with the band. To fill his absence, the band recruited former Suicide Silence drummer Alex Lopez as touring member for subsequent tours.

In August 2022 the band performed two sets on the same day at Seaworld. On October 14, 2022, the band reissued When Angels & Serpents Dance, having the album remixed and remastered as well as featuring three bonus songs, one of which, "Don't Fake It", had appeared previously as an iTunes exclusive in 2008.

=== Veritas and upcoming 12th studio album (2024–present) ===
P.O.D. released Veritas, their first studio album in six years and the first album without Bernardo, on May 3, 2024. In an interview with United Rock Nations, Sandoval stated that Bernardo is "not out of the band", but rather is taking personal space due to tension in the band and "will always be the drummer of P.O.D."; Bernardo confirmed in an interview that he has taken a hiatus, stating that "Nothing is on bad terms, it's more we're having space right now. Being on tour for thirty years starts to take a toll on anybody in different ways...For me it was obvious that it was that time for me to take a break from the traveling and doing the whole circus over and over again. I don't think I was built to do it any longer at the time...Love the guys, always gonna love the band. I started the band in my garage. It's a part of my life, it's a part of my family, it's a part of all the love that I got. I'm always gonna be center, right there with the guys, knowing what's going on and everything like that. Whenever God wants me to come back, then that's what's up for me. That's where I'm at right now."

In February 2024, the band announced the I Got That Tour supporting Veritas's release, which ran from April 26 to June 2 and was headlined by Bad Wolves, Norma Jean and Blind Channel.

On February 13, 2025, a version of "I Won't Bow Down" featuring A.N.I.M.A.L. was released.

On September 25, 2025, P.O.D. released a cover of "Don't Let Me Down" by The Beatles, ahead of their tour as an opening act for Seether and Daughtry through October and November 2025. The band also announced a special South American tour in December to finish out the year, with support from Demon Hunter and Living Sacrifice.

On January 7, 2026, Snsmix posted an interview with Sandoval discussing an upcoming album, with Sandoval stating: "We got a handful of songs in while we were on the road because we knew we were trying to hit the studio in February. We're on a kind of a crunch deadline. So we’ve got to get it in where we can." He went on to talk about Curiel experimenting with a seven-string guitar for the new songs, saying that "we're trying to go a little deeper — a little heavier. Not like metal-loud heavy, but just that deep heavy. We’re grooving in a really cool place."

On April 13, 2026, the band posted promotional pictures showing they officially started tracking their 12th studio album with producer Will Yip, with sessions underway in Pennsylvania – the first time the band had ever recorded outside of California. In May 2026, the band confirmed the album was completed, with the first single to release in August. The single, "Outbreak", was eventually released in late September and features guest vocals from Norma Jean's Cory Brandan. Press materials for the single confirmed that Zachary Christopherr, who had been touring with the band since 2024, had officially taken over from Bernardo as the band's full-time drummer.

== Musical style and influences ==
P.O.D.'s style has evolved over the years, from the rap metal sound on their early albums to the nu metal and reggae-infused alternative metal styles for which they are most well known. Regarding the nu metal classification, frontman Sonny Sandoval stated that he did not care how the band was categorized. He said: "Before any of these titles were made up, we were still doing stuff independently. We've been called everything. Twenty-seven years ago, we weren't called nu metal. People were still trying to figure out what we sounded like." He also said that the band had also been referred to as rap metal and rapcore, and that their sound had been compared to bands like Body Count, Suicidal Tendencies, Rage Against the Machine, and Limp Bizkit. He continued: "Little do people know we were around before them. It was just more of a mainstream [thing]. Again, I don't care what you call us. We just like making music, that's all." The band's seventh album, When Angels & Serpents Dance, is a combination of alternative rock, reggae rock and Latin-influenced metal with almost none of the rap metal or nu metal sound of their older releases.

The band's lyrical stance has been described as a "no-bones-about-it Jesus message" by Rapzilla, though the band is hesitant to adopt the Christian label due to their focus on being inclusive towards their secular audience.

P.O.D.'s influences include Boogie Down Productions, Run-DMC, U2, the Police, Bad Brains, Santana, Metallica, AC/DC, Suicidal Tendencies, Bob Marley, Primus, Earth, Wind & Fire, 24-7 Spyz, and Steel Pulse.

== Band members ==
P.O.D. band members at Rockharz 2026

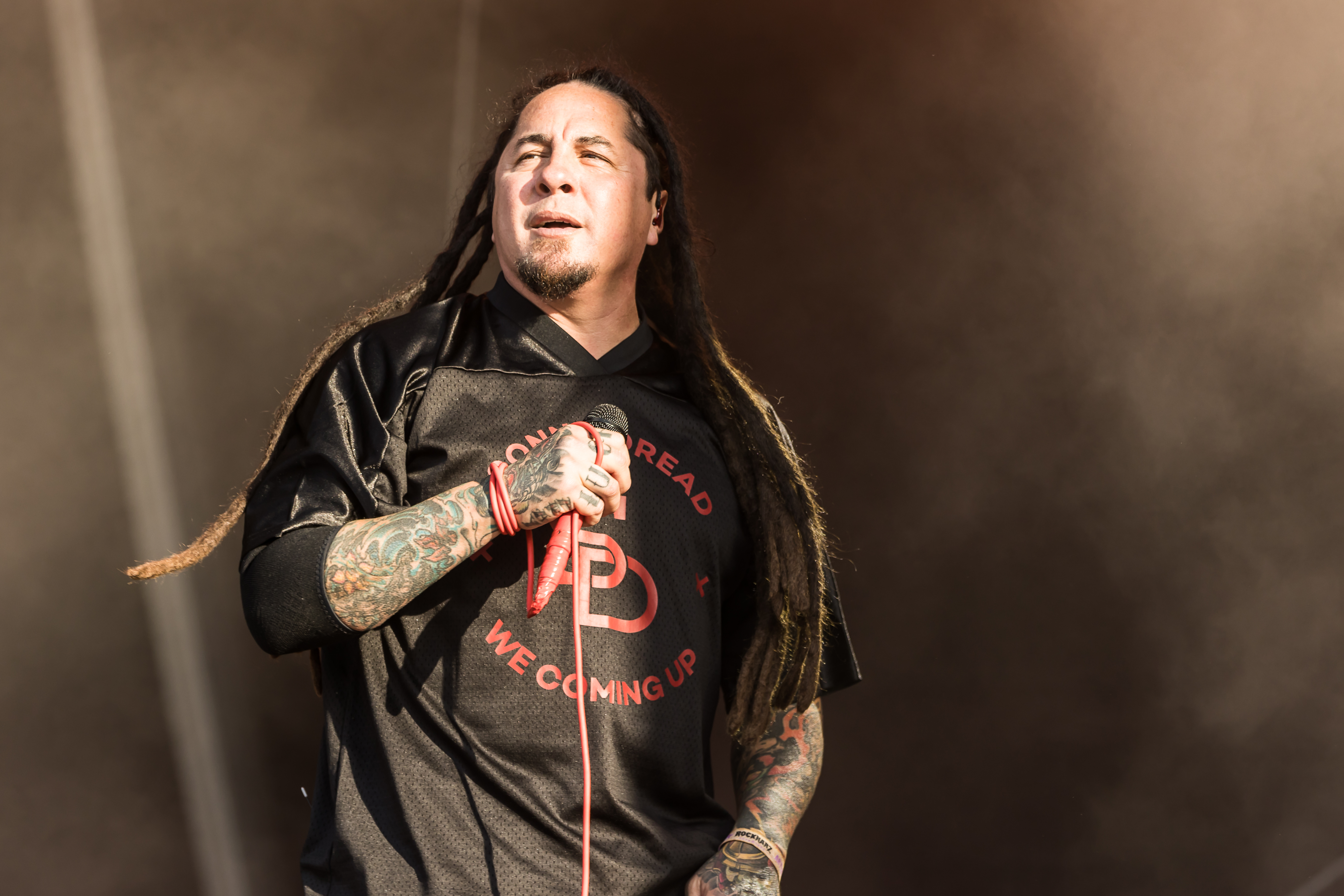
Paul "Sonny" Sandoval, vocals

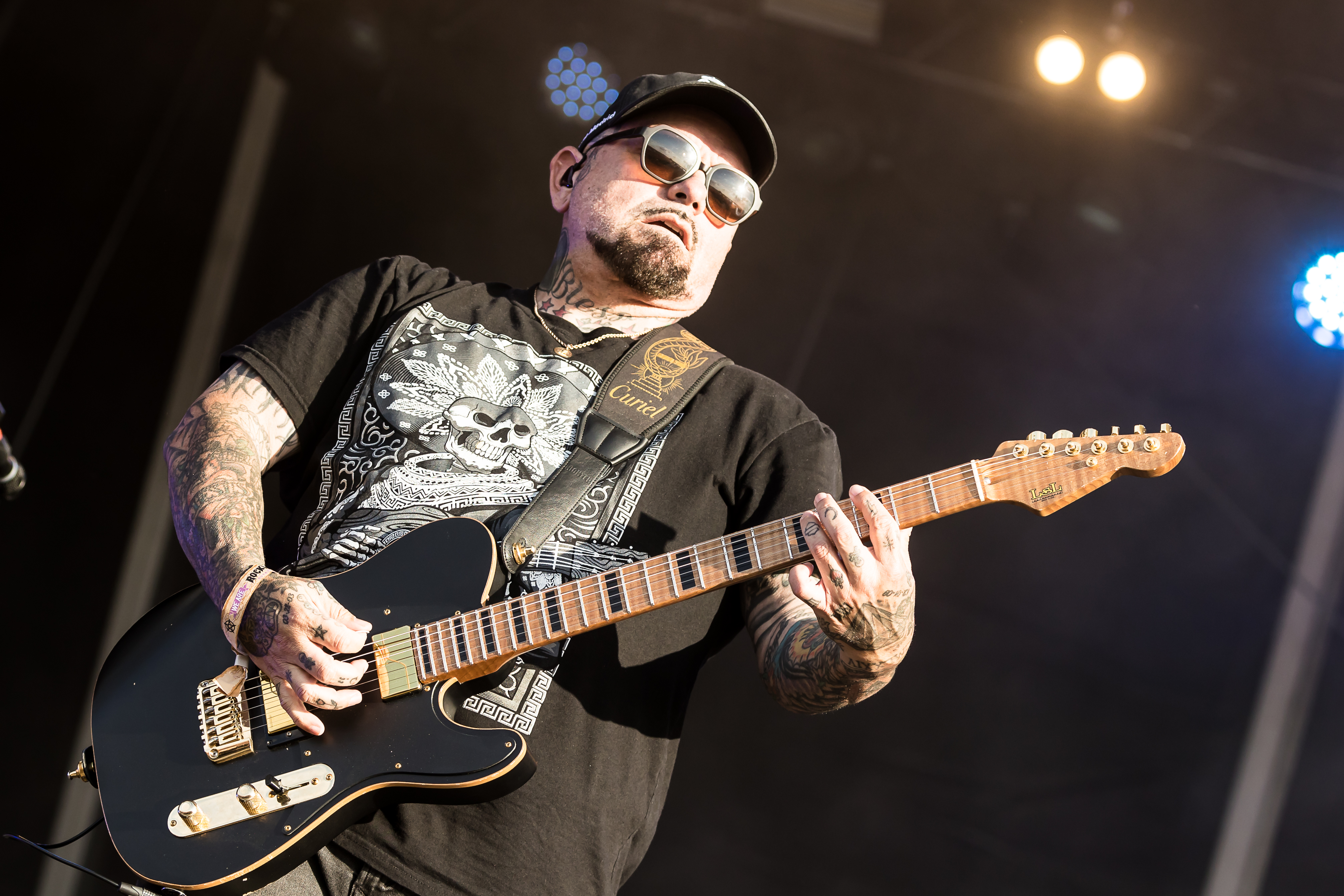
Marcos Curiel, guitar

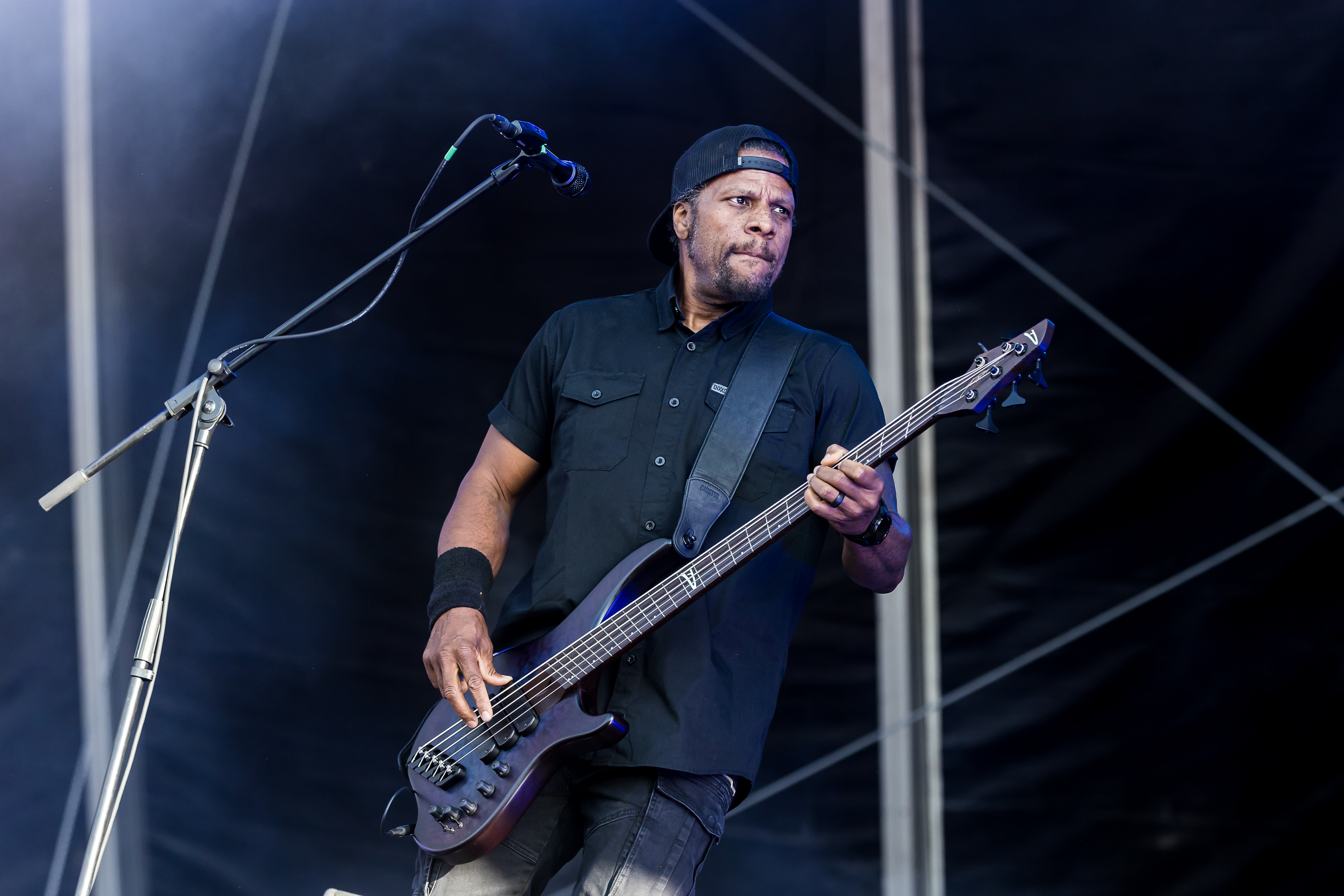
Mark "Traa" Daniels, bass

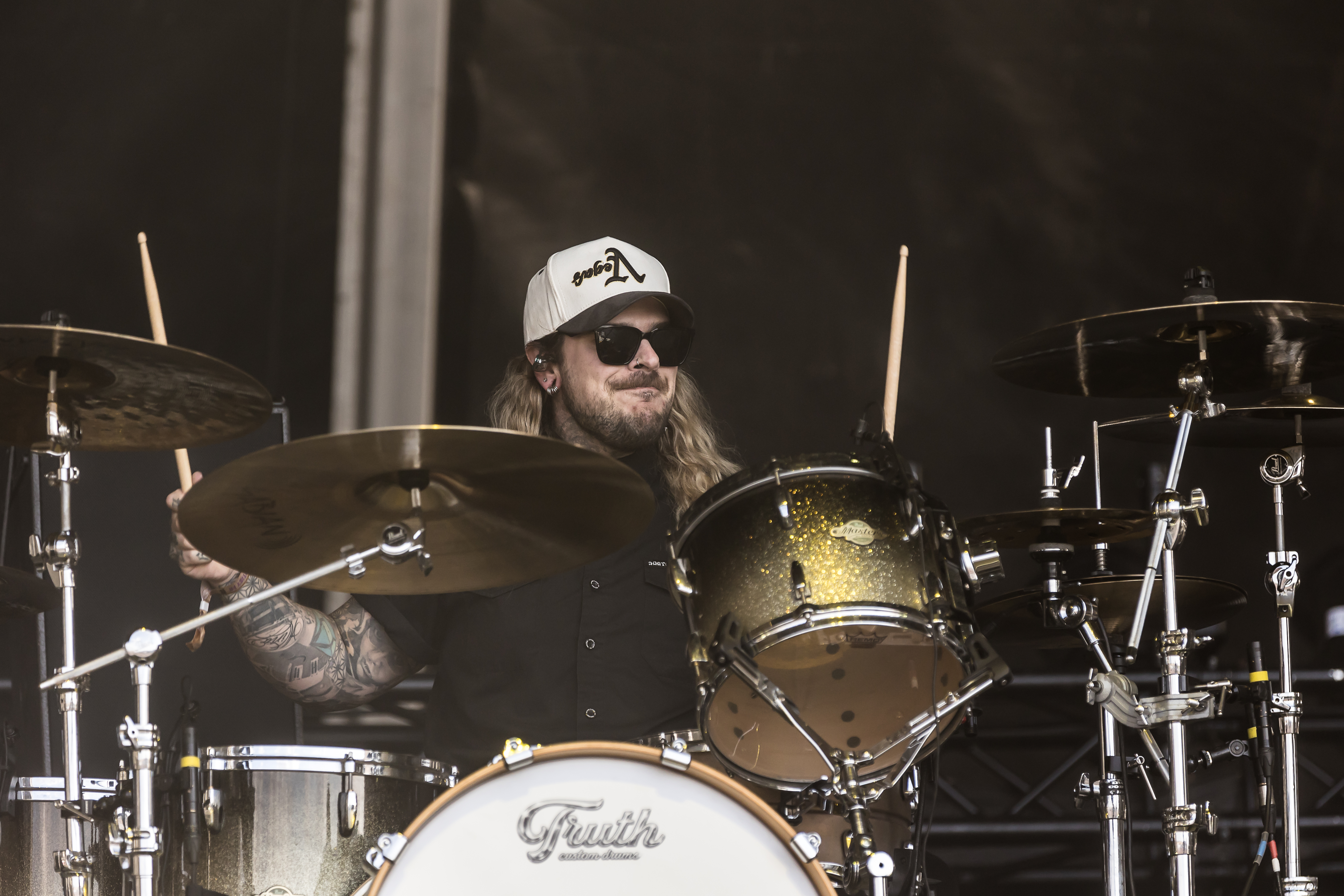
Zachary Christopherr, drums

Current members

- Paul "Sonny" Sandoval − lead vocals (1992–present)
- Mark "Traa" Daniels − bass, backing vocals (1993–present)
- Marcos Curiel − guitar, programming, backing vocals (1992–2003, 2006–present)
- Zachary Christopherr – drums (2026–present; touring musician 2024–2026)

Former members

- Gabe Portillo − bass, backing vocals (1992–1993)
- Jason Truby − guitar, programming, backing vocals (2003–2006)
- Noah "Wuv" Bernardo − drums, additional guitar and programming, backing vocals (1992–2026, on hiatus 2021–2026)

Former touring musicians

- Alex Lopez − drums (2022–2024; substitute for Wuv Bernardo)
- Tim Pacheco – backing vocals, percussion, trumpet, keyboards (2006, 2021)
- Luis Castillo – keyboards, backing vocals, percussion (2011–2016, 2021)
- Sameer Bhattacharya – keyboards, backing vocals (2016–2018)
- Jon "Jonny Beats" Young – drums (2018–2022; substitute for Wuv Bernardo)
- Ryan Flores – bass (2022; substitute for Traa Daniels)

Timeline

== Discography ==
- Snuff the Punk (1994)
- Brown (1996)
- The Fundamental Elements of Southtown (1999)
- Satellite (2001)
- Payable on Death (2003)
- Testify (2006)
- When Angels & Serpents Dance (2008)
- Murdered Love (2012)
- The Awakening (2015)
- Circles (2018)
- Veritas (2024)

== Awards ==
Award	Year	Nominee(s)	Category	Result	Ref.
American Music Awards	2003	Themselves	Favorite Contemporary Inspirational Artist	Nominated	
Echo Music Prize	2003	Themselves	Best International Newcomer	Nominated	
Echo Music Prize	2003	Themselves	Best International Alternative	Won	
Grammy Awards	2002	"Alive"	Best Hard Rock Performance	Nominated	
Grammy Awards	2003	"Youth of the Nation"	Best Hard Rock Performance	Nominated	
Grammy Awards	2003	"Portrait"	Best Metal Performance	Nominated	
Hungarian Music Awards	2003	Satellite	Best Foreign Rock Album	Nominated	
MTV Europe Music Awards	2002	Themselves	Best Hard Rock	Nominated	
MTV Video Music Awards	2002	"Alive"	Video of the Year	Nominated	
MTV Video Music Awards	2002	"Alive"	Best Group Video	Nominated	
MTV Video Music Awards	2002	"Alive"	Best Direction in a Video	Nominated	
MTV Video Music Awards	2002	"Alive"	Best Special Effects in a Video	Nominated	
MTV Video Music Awards	2002	"Alive"	Viewer's Choice	Nominated	
MTV Video Music Awards	2002	"Youth of the Nation"	Best Rock Video	Nominated	
Teen Choice Awards	2002	Satellite	Choice Album	Nominated	
Teen Choice Awards	2002	"Youth of the Nation"	Choice Rock Track	Nominated	

San Diego Music Awards

- 1999 - Best Hard Rock Artist
- 2000 - Best Hard Rock Artist

NRT We Love Awards

- 2024 - Mainstream Impact Award (pending)

Note: Album- and single-specific awards and nominations are listed under their respective articles.
