= List of nu metal bands =

The following is a list of bands that are known for playing nu metal. Nu metal (also stylized as nü-metal) is a form of alternative metal music that merges elements of heavy metal with elements of other music genres like hip-hop, grunge, alternative rock and funk.

== 0–9 ==
- .calibre
- .sPout.
- 10 Years
- 100 TVarzy Grzybiarzy
- 12 Stones
- 156/Silence
- 20 Dead Flower Children
- 24-7 Spyz
- 28 Days
- 2Cents
- 2Tm2,3
- 2X
- 3 Doors Down
- 311
- 32 Leaves
- 36 Crazyfists
- 38th Parallel
- 3rd Root
- 3rd Strike
- 3Teeth
- 40 Below Summer
- 4Lyn
- 5diez
- 6Gig
- 7000$
- 7race
- 81db
- 8stops7
- 9mm Parabellum Bullet

== A ==
- A
- A Cry Farewell
- A Killer's Confession
- A Perfect Circle
- A.N.I.M.A.L.
- Abingdon Boys School
- Acid Drinkers
- Addiction Crew
- Adema
- Ajattara
- AK-47
- Alien Ant Farm
- Alien Weaponry
- Allele
- Alligatoah
- Alpha Wolf
- AM Conspiracy
- Amatory
- Amen
- American Head Charge
- Amira Elfeky
- Anal Nosorog
- Anew Revolution
- Animal Alpha
- Ankla
- Anna
- Annalynn
- Apartment 26
- The Apex Theory
- Aphonnic
- Apulanta
- AqME
- Arbovirus
- Área 7
- Arka'n Asrafokor
- Atomship
- Attila
- Atzmus
- Audiotopsy
- Audiovent

== B ==
- Babymetal
- Beanbag
- Beautiful Creatures
- Bender
- Berri Txarrak
- Betzefer
- Big Blue Monkey
- Biohazard
- Bionic Jive
- Black Bomb A
- Black Coast
- Black Light Burns
- Blacklistt
- The Blank Theory
- Bleed
- Blind Channel
- Blindside
- Blindspott
- Blood Youth
- Bloodhound Gang
- Bloodsimple
- Bloodywood
- Bob Vylan
- Bobaflex
- Body Count
- Body Fluids
- Bodyweb
- Boiler Room
- Boo-Yaa T.R.I.B.E.
- Borialis
- Boy Hits Car
- Breach of Trust
- Breaking Benjamin
- Breaking in a Sequence
- Breaking Point
- Breed 77
- Bride
- Bring Me the Horizon
- Brougham
- Bruthal 6
- Burn Season
- Bury Your Dead
- The Butterfly Effect

== C ==
- Candiria
- Candy 66
- Cane Hill
- Caparezza
- Carajo
- Cartel de Santa
- Catupecu Machu
- Celldweller
- Cells
- Charlie Brown Jr.
- Chat Pile
- Cheese
- Chevelle
- Chicosci
- Chimaira
- The Chimpz
- Chris Warren
- Chronic Future
- Çilekeş
- City Morgue
- CKY
- Clarknova
- Clawfinger
- The Clay People
- Coal Chamber
- Cocobat
- Code Orange
- Coilbox
- Cold
- Coldrain
- Coldseed
- Coma
- COMA
- Confess
- Corporate Avenger
- Crazy Town
- Crossbreed
- Crosscut
- Crossfade
- Crossfaith
- Crush 40
- Cryoshell
- Crystal Lake
- Cuchillazo
- Cyclefly

== D ==
- D.Majiria
- D'espairsRay
- Dååth
- Dagoba
- Damageplan
- Dana Dentata
- Dangerkids
- Dark New Day
- Darwin's Waiting Room
- Daughtry
- Davey Suicide
- De La Tierra
- Dead by Wednesday
- Dead Poetic
- The Deadlights
- Deadsy
- Dealer
- Death Grips
- Deathgaze
- Ded
- Deez Nuts
- Def Con Dos
- Defenestration
- Deftones
- Demon Hunter
- Depresszió
- Depswa
- Design19
- Detonautas
- Device
- DevilDriver
- Devour the Day
- Dezert
- Dicta License
- Diecast
- Digital Summer
- Dir En Grey
- Dirty Wormz
- Disbelief
- Disciple
- Disembodied
- Disturbed
- Disturbing the Peace
- Dog Eat Dog
- Dog Fashion Disco
- Don Broco
- Dope
- doubleDrive
- Downer
- Downplay
- Downset
- Downthesun
- Dr. Core 911
- Dragon Ash
- Dragon Red
- Dragpipe
- Drain STH
- Dreadlock Pussy
- Dredg
- Droid
- Dropout Kings
- Drowning Pool
- Dry Cell
- Dry Kill Logic
- Dub War
- DVSR
- Dža ili Bu

== E ==
- E.Town Concrete
- Earshot
- Earth Crisis
- Earthsuit
- earthtone9
- East West
- Econoline Crush
- Edgewater
- Egypt Central
- Eighteen Visions
- Ektomorf
- El Peyote Asesino
- Eldrine
- Element Eighty
- Embodyment
- Emil Bulls
- Emmure
- End of April
- Endo
- Engel
- Engine
- Enhancer
- Enter Shikari
- Entity Paradigm
- Eths
- Evanescence
- Evans Blue
- Every Day Life
- The Exies
- Exilia
- Extortionist
- Extrema
- Eye Empire

== F ==
- Factory 81
- Fair to Midland
- Faktion
- Falling in Reverse
- Falling Up
- Family Force 5
- Far
- Farmer Boys
- Fasedown
- Fear Factory
- Fever 333
- Fight the Fury
- Filter
- Finch
- Finger Eleven
- Fingertight
- Fire from the Gods
- Five Finger Death Punch
- Five Foot Thick
- Five Pointe O
- Five.Bolt.Main
- Fivespeed
- Flapjack
- Flaw
- Fleshwater
- Flou
- Flybanger
- Flyleaf
- Flymore
- Follow My Lead
- FreakMind
- From Ashes to New
- From Zero
- Frontside
- Full Devil Jacket
- Full Scale
- Fury of Five
- Future Leaders of the World
- Future Palace

== G ==
- The Gazette
- Gazzoleen
- Gemini Syndrome
- Genuflect
- Get Scared
- Ghostkid
- Ghoulspoon
- Girugamesh
- Gizmachi
- Glassjaw
- Godflesh
- Godhead
- Godsmack
- Gonemage
- Grade 8
- Grand Theft Audio
- Grandson
- Graphic Nature
- Gravity Kills
- Greyhoundz
- Grinspoon
- Guano Apes
- Gun Dog
- Gut
- GZR

== H ==
- H-Blockx
- Hacktivist
- Hail the Villain
- Haji's Kitchen
- Hamlet
- Handsome
- Hardy
- The Hate Honey
- Hazen Street
- Hazydecay
- Head
- Head Phones President
- HeadCrash
- Headkase
- Headplate
- Headstrong
- Headwreck
- Hearsay TAO
- Hed PE
- Hellyeah
- Helmet
- Hide
- High and Mighty Color
- Hollywood Undead
- Hoobastank
- Hope
- Hora Zulu
- Hot Action Cop
- Hotwire
- Human Waste Project
- The Humble Brothers
- Hurt
- Hyde
- Hyro the Hero

== I ==
- I Prevail
- Ikd-sj
- Ill Niño
- In Flames
- In Hearts Wake
- Incubus
- Indorphine
- Infected Rain
- Injected
- InMe
- Insane Clown Posse
- Insolence
- Integrity
- Intwine
- Invidia
- Islander
- Issues

== J ==
- Jane Air
- Jane's Addiction
- Janus
- Jeff Killed John
- Jeffrey Nothing
- Jepetto
- Jeris Johnson
- Jerk
- Jesus Martyr
- Jimmie's Chicken Shack
- Jinjer
- Jonah33
- Jonathan Davis
- Jousilouli
- Justifide

== K ==
- Kagerou
- Kamikazee
- Karate High School
- Karnivool
- Katatonia
- Kazik na Żywo
- Kazzer
- Kells
- Kid Rock
- Kidneythieves
- Kilgore
- Kilkus
- Kill II This
- Kim Sa-rang
- King 810
- King Mungi
- Kitchen Knife Conspiracy
- Kittie
- Kjwan
- Klank
- Klaws
- Knives Out!
- Kontrust
- Korn
- Kush
- Kutless

== L ==
- Lacuna Coil
- Landmvrks
- Lazy Mutha Fucka
- Lennon
- The Letter Black
- Level
- Liberty 37
- Lies
- Lifer
- Lillasyster
- Limp Bizkit
- Linea 77
- Linkin Park
- Lions at the Gate
- Liquid Gang
- Liquid Oxygen Can
- Living Sacrifice
- Lluther
- Lo-Pro
- Loathe
- Lofofora
- LOK
- Lollipop Lust Kill
- Lost Society
- Lostprophets
- Lotus Eater
- Loudness
- Love and Death
- Lucerin Blue
- Luti-Kriss
- Luxt
- Luxtorpeda
- Lynch Mob

== M ==
- Machine Head
- Mad at Gravity
- The Mad Capsule Markets
- Mallavora
- Man with a Mission
- Manafest
- Manapart
- Manga
- Margret Heater
- Marilyn Manson
- Marz
- Masnada
- Mass Hysteria
- Maximum the Hormone
- Mayfly
- McQueen
- Medication
- Megaherz
- Memento
- Memorrhage
- Methods of Mayhem
- Microwave
- Mindless Self Indulgence
- Mindset Evolution
- Minus.Driver
- Miocene
- Missile Girl Scoot
- Mnemic
- Moby Dick
- Molotov
- Monkey Insane
- Moodring
- Motionless in White
- Motograter
- Motown Rage
- Mucc
- Mudvayne
- Murderdolls
- Mushroomhead
- Mutha's Day Out
- My Enemies & I
- My Ruin
- My Ticket Home
- My Vitriol
- MyPollux
- Myth City

== N ==
- Nailed Promise
- Naio Ssaion
- Narrow Head
- Nathan James
- Necro
- Nervepitch
- Neurosonic
- Neurotica
- Nevada Tan
- New Years Day
- No One
- No One Is Innocent
- No Warning
- Nocturne
- Nonpoint
- Nora
- Northlane
- Nothingface
- Nova Twins
- Novelists
- Nu-Nation
- Null Positiv

== O ==
- Oblivion Dust
- Ocean Grove
- Odd Crew
- Of Mice & Men
- Oficina G3
- On Broken Wings
- The One Hundred
- One Minute Silence
- One Ok Rock
- Onesidezero
- Oneyed Jack
- Oomph!
- Orange 9mm
- Orgy
- Orthodox
- Osdorp Posse
- Otep
- Oversize
- Oxymorrons

== P ==
- P.O.D.
- Pacifier
- Pain of Salvation
- Painface
- Paleface Swiss
- Papa Roach
- Parokya ni Edgar
- Passenger
- PAX217
- Pay Money to My Pain
- Peace of Mind
- Peach FTL
- PeelingFlesh
- Pete.
- Petit Brabancon
- Phunk Junkeez
- Pia
- Pillar
- Pimpadelic
- Pin Drop Violence
- Pist.On
- Pitchshifter
- Pitty
- Planet Hemp
- Pleymo
- Pop Evil
- Pop Shuvit
- Poppy
- Powder
- Powerflo
- Powerman 5000
- pre)Thing
- Pressure 4-5
- Primer 55
- Primus
- Prison
- Professional Murder Music
- Project 86
- Project Wyze
- Project46
- The Prom Kings
- Prong
- Prophets of Rage
- Proyecto Eskhata
- Psychea
- Psycho Synner
- Psychostick
- Psycore
- Public Display of Infection
- Puddle of Mudd
- Pulkas
- Pulse Ultra
- Purgatory
- Pushmonkey
- Puya

== Q ==
- Qbo
- Quarashi
- Queenadreena

== R ==
- Ra
- Rage Against the Machine
- Raging Speedhorn
- Raimundos
- Rammstein
- Red
- RedHook
- Reform the Resistance
- Refused
- Regurgitator
- Rehab
- Rekiem
- Resolve
- Resorte
- Rev Theory
- Reveille
- Rey Chocolate
- Ribo
- Rico Nasty
- Rise of the Northstar
- Rize
- Roadrunner United
- Rob Zombie
- RockA
- Rockbitch
- Rod Laver
- Rodox
- Rootwater
- Rottengraffty

== S ==
- Sadist
- Saint Asonia
- Saint Loco
- Saliva
- Salmon
- The Samans
- Sandwich
- Scar the Martyr
- Scare Don't Fear
- Scars of Life
- Scars on Broadway
- Scene Queen
- Scorch
- Seether
- Segression
- Sektor Gaza
- Senser
- Seo Taiji
- Sepultura
- Serial Joe
- Serj Tankian
- Sev
- Sevendust
- Sexart
- Shinedown
- Shinobi Ninja
- The Shizit
- Shootyz Groove
- Showtaro Morikubo
- Shuvel
- SHVPES
- Sic
- Sick Puppies
- Sicksense
- Sicmonic
- Sidilarsen
- Silent Theory
- SiM
- Simon Says
- Since October
- Sinch
- Sinergia
- Skillet
- Skindred
- Skinhate
- Skinlab
- Skrape
- Skunk Anansie
- Skunk D.F.
- Slapshock
- Slaughter to Prevail
- Slaves on Dope
- Slipknot
- Slot
- Smash Hit Combo
- Smile Empty Soul
- Smogus
- Snapcase
- Snot
- Socialburn
- Society 1
- Sock
- Soil
- Soilwork
- Sonic Syndicate
- Soulfly
- Soulidium
- South Arcade
- Soziedad Alkoholika
- Speed
- Split Chain
- The Spindle Sect
- Spineshank
- Spiritbox
- Spoken
- Sprung Monkey
- Spyair
- Stabbing Westward
- Staind
- Starset
- Static Dress
- Static-X
- Stemm
- Stepa
- Stereomud
- Stererotypical Working Class
- Stigmata
- Still Breathing
- StillWell
- Stitched Up Heart
- Stone Deep
- Stone Sour
- Straight Line Stitch
- Strata
- Stray from the Path
- Stuck Mojo
- Stutterfly
- Sub Dub Micromachine
- Suburban Tribe
- Such a Surge
- Sugar Ray
- SugarComa
- Sugarless
- Suicide Silence
- Sum 41
- Sunk Loto
- Sunna
- Super Junky Monkey
- Superbutt
- Superheist
- Swift
- Sw1tched
- Sworn In
- SX-10
- Sylar
- System of a Down
- Systematic

== T ==
- Tadpole
- Tallah
- Tantric
- Taproot
- Taster’s Choice
- ten56.
- Terror Universal
- Testeagles
- Tetrarch
- TH6
- Thebandwithnoname
- Thornhill
- Thornley
- Thousand Foot Krutch
- Thousand Thoughts
- Three Days Grace
- Thrown
- Thumb
- Tihuana
- Tinfed
- TobyMac
- Tommy Lee
- Toothgrinder
- Tracktor Bowling
- Training for Utopia
- Transport League
- Trapt
- Trash Boat
- Travail
- TraxX
- Tribal Ink
- Tricky
- Trik Turner
- Trust Company
- Tura Satana
- Turnstile
- Twelve Foot Ninja
- Twelvestep
- Twin Method
- Twin Zero
- Twisted Method
- Twiztid

== U ==
- U.P.O.
- Ultraspank
- Underground Moon
- Underoath
- Unfold
- The Union Underground
- UnityTX
- Unjust
- Unlocking the Truth
- Ünloco
- Unswabbed
- Upon a Burning Body
- Urban Dance Squad
- Urbandub
- The Urge
- Urgh!
- Utsu-P
- Uzumaki

== V ==
- V Shape Mind
- Vampires on Tomato Juice
- Van Der Dijs
- Vanilla Ice
- Varga
- Varials
- Vegastar
- Vein.fm
- Velcra
- Vended
- Vex Red
- Vexed
- Victor
- Videodrone
- Vimic
- Violent Delight
- Virgin
- Virgos Merlot
- Vision of Disorder
- Vistlip
- Voice of Baceprot
- Void of Vision
- Volumes

== W ==
- Waltari
- Wargasm
- The Warning
- Watcha
- Wayne Static
- We Are the Fallen
- Wicked Wisdom
- Wilabilaw
- Will Haven
- Wired All Wrong
- Wirefall
- Wisp
- The Workhorse Movement
- Wünjo

== X ==
- X-Vision
- XIII Minutes
- Xombie
- Xygen

== Y ==
- Yaksa
- YamaArashi
- Years Since the Storm
- Yuyoyuppe

== Z ==
- Zeal & Ardor
- Zebrahead
- Zero 9:36
- Zeromancer
- Zeroscape
- Zilch
- ZillaKami
- Zug Izland

== See also ==
- List of alternative metal bands
- List of rap rock bands
