= List of alternative metal bands =

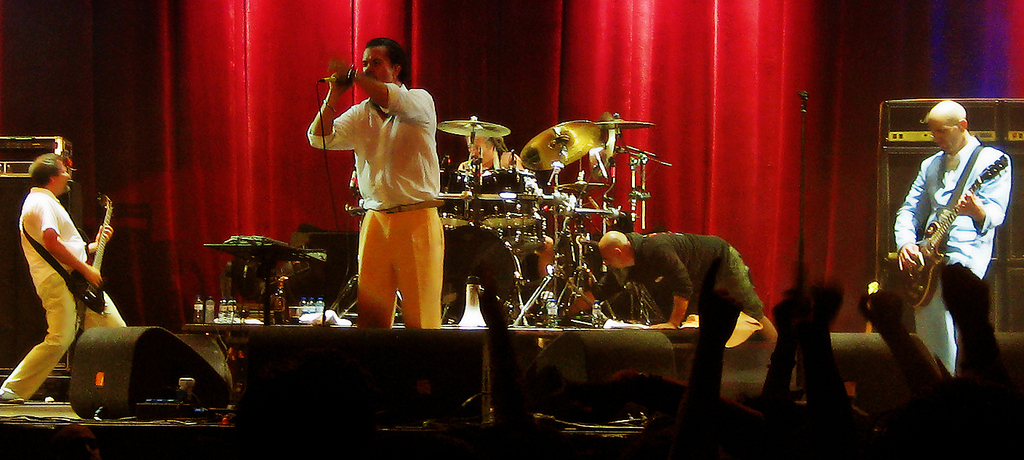
Faith No More is often credited for inventing the alternative metal genre.

This is a list of alternative metal artists. Alternative metal (or alt-metal) is a genre of heavy metal music that combines heavy metal with influences from alternative rock and other genres not normally associated with metal. Alternative metal bands are often characterized by heavily downtuned, mid-paced guitar riffs, a mixture of accessible melodic vocals and harsh vocals and sometimes unconventional sounds within other heavy metal styles. The term has been in use since the 1980s, although it came into prominence in the 1990s.

== List ==
Band	Origin	Active	Notes
10 Years	United States	Yes	Also classed as nu metal and progressive metal.
12 Stones	United States	Yes	Also classed as post-grunge, alternative rock and Christian rock.
36 Crazyfists	United States	No	Also classed as metalcore, post-hardcore and nu metal.
311	United States	Yes	Also classed as reggae rock, alternative rock, rap metal, funk rock, rap rock, and funk metal.
3Teeth	United States	Yes	Also classed as industrial metal, industrial, industrial rock, electronic rock, electro-industrial, and nu metal.
40 Below Summer	United States	Yes	Also classed as nu metal and hard rock.
Adema	United States	Yes	Also classed as nu metal, alternative rock, and post-grunge.
Alcest	France	Yes	Also classed as post-metal, shoegaze, blackgaze, post-black metal, and black metal (early).
All Ends	Sweden	No	Also classed as alternative rock and hard rock.
Alice in Chains	United States	Yes	Also classed as grunge, heavy metal, doom metal, sludge metal, and alternative rock.
Alien Ant Farm	United States	Yes	Also classed as alternative rock, nu metal, punk rock, and pop punk.
Alter Bridge	United States	Yes	Also classed as hard rock, heavy metal, post-grunge, progressive metal, and alternative rock.
American Head Charge	United States	No	Also classed as nu metal and industrial metal.
American Standards	United States	Yes	Also classed as mathcore, metalcore, post hardcore and hardcore punk.
Anew Revolution	United States	Yes	Also classed as nu metal.
A Pale Horse Named Death	United States	Yes	Also classed as gothic metal, doom metal, and post-grunge.
Apartment 26	United Kingdom	No	Also classed as nu metal. and industrial metal.
A Perfect Circle	United States	Yes	Also classed as alternative rock, progressive rock, and art rock.
Apocalyptica	Finland	Yes	Also classed as neoclassical metal and symphonic metal.
Architects	United Kingdom	Yes	Also classed as mathcore (early), metalcore, post-hardcore and progressive metalcore.
Art of Anarchy	United States	Yes	Also classed as post-grunge, hard rock, and alternative rock.
Asking Alexandria	United Kingdom	Yes	Also classed as electronicore, hard rock, heavy metal, metalcore and post-hardcore.
Atomship	United States	Yes	Also classed as alternative rock, post-grunge, and progressive rock.
At the Drive-In	United States	On hiatus	Also classed as post-hardcore.
Audioslave	United States	No	Also classed as hard rock, funk rock, and alternative rock.
Avatar	Sweden	Yes	Also classed as melodic death metal, groove metal, progressive metal, and industrial metal.
Avenged Sevenfold	United States	Yes	Also classed as heavy metal, hard rock, progressive metal, and metalcore (early).
Babymetal	Japan	Yes	Also classed as heavy metal, death metal, speed metal and j-pop.
Bad Brains	United States	Yes	1986 album I Against I recognized as one of the first alternative metal albums. Also classed as hardcore punk and reggae rock.
Bad Omens	United States	Yes	Also classed as metalcore.
Baroness	United States	Yes	Also classed as sludge metal, progressive metal and post-rock.
Beartooth	United States	Yes	Also classed as metalcore, hardcore, post-hardcore, and hard rock.
Black Veil Brides	United States	Yes	Also classed as melodic metalcore, glam metal, heavy metal, and hard rock.
Bleed	United States	Yes	Also classed as nu metal and shoegaze.
Breaking Benjamin	United States	Yes	Also classed as alternative rock and post-grunge.
Bring Me the Horizon	United Kingdom	Yes	Also classed as alternative rock, metalcore, deathcore, and post-hardcore.
Bullet for My Valentine	United Kingdom	Yes	Also classed as hard rock, heavy metal, metalcore and thrash metal.
Butthole Surfers	United States	On hiatus	Also classed as alternative rock, neo-psychedelia, experimental rock and hardcore punk.
Chevelle	United States	Yes	Also classed as hard rock, post-grunge, alternative rock, nu metal, and indie rock.
CKY	United States	Yes	Also classed as alternative rock, stoner rock, and hard rock.
Clawfinger	Sweden	Yes	Also classed as rap metal, industrial metal and nu metal.
Clutch	United States	Yes	Also classed as hard rock, stoner rock, blues rock, post-hardcore (early), funk metal and hardcore punk (early).
Coal Chamber	United States	Yes	Also classed as nu metal, industrial metal and gothic metal.
Code Orange	United States	Yes	Also classed as metalcore, hardcore punk, industrial hardcore, and industrial metal.
Cold	United States	Yes	Also classed as post-grunge, hard rock and alternative rock.
Coldrain	Japan	Yes	Also classed as alternative rock, post-hardcore, metalcore, hard rock and punk rock.
Daron Malakian and Scars on Broadway	United States	Yes	Also classed as alternative rock.
Decyfer Down	United States	Yes	Also classed as alternative rock and post-grunge.
Defrage	Estonia	No	Also classed as alternative rock and post-grunge.
Deftones	United States	Yes	Also classed as nu metal, experimental rock, post-metal, post-hardcore, and art rock.
Demon Hunter	United States	Yes	Also classed as metalcore, nu metal, groove metal, and Christian metal.
Depswa	United States	On hiatus	Also classed as nu metal.
Devilskin	New Zealand	Yes	Also classed as hard rock and heavy metal.
Disturbed	United States	Yes	Also classed as nu metal, hard rock, and heavy metal.
Dir En Grey	Japan	Yes	Also classed as industrial metal, nu metal, death metal, experimental metal, progressive metal, and extreme metal.
Dog Fashion Disco	United States	Yes	Also classed as experimental metal.
Dope	United States	Yes	Also classed as industrial metal and nu metal
downset.	United States	Yes	Also classed as rap metal, funk metal, hardcore punk and rapcore.
Drowning Pool	United States	Yes	Also classed as nu metal, heavy metal, hard rock and post-grunge.
Earshot	United States	Yes	Also classed as hard rock and post-grunge.
Earthtone9	United Kingdom	Yes	
Echobrain	United States	No	
Enter Shikari	United Kingdom	Yes	Also classed as metalcore, electronicore and post-hardcore.
Evanescence	United States	Yes	Also classed as gothic rock, gothic metal, nu metal (early), hard rock and symphonic metal
Failure	United States	Yes	Also classed as alternative rock, art rock, space rock and post-grunge
Fair to Midland	United States	On hiatus	Also classed as progressive rock.
Faith No More	United States	Yes	Recognized as one of the earliest alternative metal bands. Also classed as funk metal, experimental metal and alternative rock.
Fantômas	United States	Yes	Also classed as experimental metal.
Fear Factory	United States	Yes	Recognized as one of the first heavy metal bands to fuse metal with industrial and electronic stylings. Also classed as industrial metal and death metal.
Fightstar	United Kingdom	Yes	Also classed as post-hardcore, alternative rock, emo, and heavy metal.
Finger Eleven	Canada	Yes	Also classed as alternative rock, post-grunge, hard rock and funk metal.
Filter	United States	Yes	Also classed as industrial rock, industrial metal and post-grunge.
Five Finger Death Punch	United States	Yes	Also classed as groove metal, nu metal, heavy metal, and hard rock.
Flyleaf	United States	Yes	Also classed as hard rock, Christian rock and post-grunge.
From Ashes to New	United States	Yes	Also classed as nu metal, rap metal and rap rock.
Fudge Tunnel	United Kingdom	No	Also classed as noise rock and sludge metal.
Fuel	United States	Yes	Also classed as hard rock and post-grunge.
Full Devil Jacket	United States	Yes	Also classed as post-grunge.
Full Scale	Australia	No	Also classed as post-grunge
Funeral for a Friend	United Kingdom	Yes	Also classed as emo, post-hardcore, screamo and melodic hardcore.
Future Palace	Germany	Yes	Also classed as post-hardcore and alternative rock.
Glassjaw	United States	Yes	Also classed as post-hardcore, hardcore punk, progressive rock and experimental rock
Godsmack	United States	Yes	Also classed as hard rock, heavy metal, post-grunge, and nu metal.
Green Jellÿ	United States	Yes	Also classed as comedy rock.
Grinspoon	Australia	Yes	Also classed as post-grunge, alternative rock and nu metal
Guano Apes	Germany	Yes	Also classed as alternative rock and nu metal.
Hayko Cepkin	Turkey	Yes	Also classed as heavy metal and industrial rock.
Halestorm	United States	Yes	Also classed as hard rock and alternative rock.
Handsome	United States	No	Also classed as post-hardcore.
Helmet	United States	Yes	Also classed as post-hardcore, noise rock, alternative rock, groove metal, post-metal and experimental metal.
Hollywood Undead	United States	Yes	Also classed as rap rock, alternative rock, nu metal, rap metal, hard rock and hip hop.
I Prevail	United States	Yes	Also classed as metalcore, post-hardcore, pop punk, hard rock, rap metal, and nu metal.
Ill Niño	United States	Yes	Also classed as Latin metal, nu metal and metalcore.
Infectious Grooves	United States	Yes	Also classed as funk metal
In Flames	Sweden	Yes	Also classed as melodic death metal.
In This Moment	United States	Yes	Also classed as metalcore, melodic metalcore, hard rock, industrial metal, gothic metal, and nu metal.
Incubus	United States	Yes	Also classed as funk metal (early), nu metal (early), rap metal (early), alternative rock (later) and art rock (later).
Jane's Addiction	United States	On hiatus	Also classed as alternative rock and progressive rock.
Jerry Cantrell	United States	Yes	Also classed as alternative rock, heavy metal, and grunge.
Jesters of Destiny	United States	Yes	Also classed as heavy metal, hard rock and psychedelic rock.
The Jesus Lizard	United States	Yes	Also classed as noise-rock and post-hardcore.
Karnivool	Australia	Yes	Also classed as progressive metal, progressive rock, alternative rock and nu metal (early)
Kittie	Canada	Yes	Also classed as nu metal, groove metal, and death metal.
Knives Out!	United States	Yes	
Korn	United States	Yes	Also classed as nu metal, industrial metal, rap metal, funk metal, groove metal and dark metal.
L7	United States	Yes	Also classed as grunge, punk rock and riot grrrl.
Lacuna Coil	Italy	Yes	Also classed as gothic metal and dark metal.
Life of Agony	United States	Yes	Also classed as alternative rock, grunge, and post-grunge.
Lifer	United States	Yes	Also classed as nu metal.
Leprous	Norway	Yes	Also classed as progressive metal
Limp Bizkit	United States	Yes	Also classed as nu metal, rap metal and rap rock.
Linkin Park	United States	Yes	Also classed as nu metal, rap rock, electronic rock and rap metal.
Living Colour	United States	Yes	Also classed as funk metal, heavy metal and hard rock.
Loathe	United Kingdom	Yes	Also classed as metalcore, melodic hardcore, nu metal, progressive metal, post-metal and shoegaze.
Lostprophets	United Kingdom	No	Also classed as alternative rock, post-hardcore and nu metal.
Love and Death	United States	Yes	Also classed as Christian metal and nu metal.
The Lounge Kittens	United Kingdom	No	Also classed as lounge music, rock music, parody music, and comedy rock.
Machine Head	United States	Yes	Also classed as groove metal, thrash metal, and nu metal.
Mallavora	United Kingdom	Yes	
Major Moment	United States	Yes	
Marilyn Manson	United States	Yes	Also classed as industrial metal, industrial rock, shock rock and alternative rock.
Mastodon	United States	Yes	Also classed as sludge metal, progressive metal and stoner metal.
Melvins	United States	Yes	Also classed as various other genres, including grunge, sludge metal and doom metal.
Mind Funk	United States	No	Also classed as funk metal, grunge and stoner rock.
Mind Over Four	United States	No	Also classed as progressive metal.
Motionless in White	United States	Yes	Also classed as industrial metal, metalcore, gothic metal, and nu metal.
Mother Love Bone	United States	No	Also classed as grunge, glam metal, glam punk, hard rock, funk metal and heavy metal.
Mr. Bungle	United States	Yes	Also classed as various other genres, including avant-garde and funk metal.
Mt. Helium	United States	No	Also classed as progressive metal, post-grunge and nu metal. Formerly known as The Apex Theory.
Mudvayne	United States	Yes	Also classed as heavy metal, nu metal, progressive metal, math metal and groove metal.
Mushroomhead	United States	Yes	Also classed as nu metal, industrial metal, experimental metal and electro-industrial.
Nebula	United States	On hiatus	Also classed as stoner rock, heavy metal and psychedelic rock.
New Years Day	United States	Yes	Also classed as gothic metal/rock, alternative rock, and pop-punk (early).
Nine Inch Nails	United States	Yes	Also classed as industrial rock, industrial metal, dark ambient, and alternative rock.
Nonpoint	United States	Yes	Also classed as nu metal, hard rock, rap metal and groove metal.
Nothingface	United States	No	Also classed as nu metal.
Nothing More	United States	Yes	Also classed as alternative rock, hard rock, and progressive rock/metal.
Norma Jean	United States	Yes	Also classed as metalcore, sludge metal and post-metal.
Northlane	Australia	Yes	Also classed as djent, industrial metal, metalcore, nu metal and progressive metalcore.
Odd Crew	Bulgaria	Yes	Also classed as groove metal.
Only Living Witness	United States	No	Also classed as hardcore punk and grunge.
Orange 9mm	United States	Yes	Also classed as post-hardcore, nu metal and rap metal.
Orangutang	United States	No	Also classed as pop rock, and alternative rock.
Orgy	United States	Yes	Also classed as industrial rock, industrial metal, nu metal, electronic rock and electropunk.
Otep	United States	Yes	Also classed as nu metal and death metal.
P.O.D.	United States	Yes	Also classed as nu metal, rap metal, Christian metal, reggae rock.
Papa Roach	United States	Yes	Also classed as nu metal, alternative rock, hard rock, rap metal, and glam metal.
Passenger	Sweden	No	Also classed as nu metal.
Paw	United States	No	Also classed as grunge and alternative rock.
Phoxjaw	United Kingdom	Yes	Also classed as post-hardcore and alternative rock.
Pist.On	United States	Yes	Also classed as gothic metal.
Pitchshifter	United Kingdom	Yes	Also classed as industrial rock, nu metal and industrial metal.
Polkadot Cadaver	United States	Yes	Also classed as avant-garde/experimental metal.
Porcupine Tree	United Kingdom	Yes	Also classed as progressive rock, progressive metal, alternative rock, psychedelic rock, and experimental rock.
Powerman 5000	United States	Yes	Also classed as industrial metal, rap metal, nu metal, thrash metal, funk metal, electronic rock, alternative rock, and punk rock.
Primus	United States	Yes	Also classed as funk metal, alternative rock, experimental rock, funk rock, progressive rock, progressive metal, jam and nu metal (Antipop period).
Project 86	United States	Yes	Also classed as Christian rock, Christian metal, alternative rock, nu metal, post-hardcore, and rapcore.
Psycho Synner	United States	No	Also classed as industrial metal, hard rock, nu metal and gothic rock.
Prong	United States	Yes	Also classed as industrial metal, thrash metal, groove metal and hardcore punk.
Puddle of Mudd	United States	Yes	Also classed as post-grunge, hard rock, alternative rock and nu metal.
Pyogenesis	Germany	Yes	Also classed as death metal (early), doom metal, gothic metal, alternative rock, and pop-punk (1990s–2000s).
Quicksand	United States	Yes	Also classed as post-hardcore.
Rage Against the Machine	United States	No	Also classed as rap metal, nu metal, and funk metal
Red	United States	Yes	Also classed as alternative rock, hard rock, christian rock, and post-grunge.
Red Hot Chili Peppers	United States	Yes	Also classed as funk rock, alternative rock, funk metal and rap rock.
Reuben	United Kingdom	No	Also classed as alternative rock, hard rock, and post-hardcore.
Rob Zombie	United States	Yes	Also classed as heavy metal, industrial metal, groove metal, industrial rock and nu metal.
Rollins Band	United States	No	Also classed as hard rock, post-hardcore, funk metal and jazz fusion.
Roses Are Red	United States	No	Also classed as emo and alternative rock.
Scar the Martyr	United States	No	Also classed as post-grunge.
Scum of the Earth	United States	Yes	Also classed as heavy metal.
Seether	South Africa	Yes	Also classed as post-grunge.
September Mourning	United States	Yes	
Sepultura	Brazil	Yes	Also classed as groove metal, death metal, and thrash metal.
Serj Tankian	United States	Yes	Also classed as progressive rock, experimental rock, art rock and classical.
Sevendust	United States	Yes	Also classed as nu metal and heavy metal.
Shihad	New Zealand	Yes	Also classed as alternative rock, hard rock, and industrial rock.
Shinedown	United States	Yes	Also classed as hard rock, post-grunge and alternative rock.
Siamese	Denmark	Yes	Also classed as alternative rock.
Sick Puppies	Australia	Yes	Also classed as alternative rock, hard rock, and post-grunge.
Simon Says	United States	Yes	Also classed as nu metal.
Skillet	United States	Yes	Also classed as Christian rock, Christian metal, post-grunge, alternative rock, hard rock, nu metal, symphonic metal and industrial metal (early).
Skindred	United Kingdom	Yes	Also classed as ragga and nu metal
Slaves on Dope	Canada	Yes	Also classed as nu metal.
Sleep Token	United Kingdom	Yes	Also classed as indie pop/rock, post-metal, and progressive metal.
Slipknot	United States	Yes	Also classed as nu metal.
Smash into Pieces	Sweden	Yes	Also classed as pop-rock and alternative rock.
Snot	United States	Yes	Also classed as nu metal, hardcore punk, and funk metal.
SOiL	United States	Yes	Also classed as nu metal, hard rock, heavy metal, groove metal and post-grunge.
Soundgarden	United States	No	Also classed as grunge, heavy metal, alternative rock, and garage punk.
Spiritbox	Canada	Yes	Also classed as djent, metalcore, nu metal, progressive metal and post-metal.
Sum 41	United States	No	Also classed as punk rock, pop punk, alternative rock, and skate punk.
Stabbing Westward	United States	Yes	Also classed as industrial rock and alternative rock.
Staind	United States	Yes	Also classed as nu metal and post-grunge
Static-X	United States	Yes	Also classed as industrial metal and nu metal.
Stereomud	United States	No	Also classed as hard rock and nu metal.
Stone Sour	United States	On hiatus	Also classed as post-grunge, hard rock and heavy metal.
Stone Temple Pilots	United States	Yes	Also classed as alternative rock, hard rock, grunge and neo-psychedelia
Stuck Mojo	United States	Yes	Also classed as rap metal and nu metal.
SugarComa	United Kingdom	No	Also classed as nu metal.
System of a Down	United States	Yes	Also classed as heavy metal, nu metal, progressive rock, progressive metal, hard rock, alternative rock, experimental rock, and art rock.
Tad	United States	No	Also classed as grunge, groove metal and alternative rock.
Tallah	United States	Yes	Also classed as nu metal, metalcore, hardcore punk, industrial metal, rap metal, and nu metalcore.
Taproot	United States	Yes	Also classed as nu metal, alternative rock and post-grunge.
Therapy?	United Kingdom	Yes	Also classed as alternative rock, punk rock, and noise rock.
The Butterfly Effect	Australia	Yes	Also classed as alternative rock and progressive rock.
The Smashing Pumpkins	United States	Yes	Also classed as alternative rock, gothic rock, psychedelic rock, dream pop, grunge, progressive metal, progressive rock and shoegazing.
The Veer Union	Canada	Yes	Also classed as alternative rock, post-grunge, melodic metal, and hard rock
Three Days Grace	Canada	Yes	Also classed as alternative rock, post-grunge, and hard rock
Thornhill	Australia	Yes	Also classed as metalcore and nu metal.
Tomahawk	United States	Yes	Also classed as alternative rock, experimental rock, progressive rock and Native American music.
Tool	United States	Yes	Also classed as progressive metal, progressive rock, heavy metal, and art rock.
Trapt	United States	Yes	Also classed as hard rock, post-grunge and nu metal.
Tremonti	United States	Yes	Also classed as thrash metal and speed metal.
Twelve Foot Ninja	Australia	No	Also classed as experimental rock, funk metal and djent
Ugly Kid Joe	United States	Yes	Also classed as hard rock, heavy metal, glam metal and funk metal.
Vampires Everywhere!	United States	Yes	Also classed as post-hardcore, metalcore, gothic metal, shock rock, industrial metal and horror punk.
Vimic	United States	On hiatus	Also classed as groove metal.
Waltari	Finland	Yes	Also classed as progressive metal, crossover thrash, hard rock, avant-garde metal, death metal, punk rock, symphonic metal, pop rock, and techno.
Warrior Soul	United States	Yes	Also classed as hard rock.
We Came as Romans	United States	Yes	Also classed as metalcore, post-hardcore, melodic hardcore, symphonic metal, and electronicore.
White Zombie	United States	No	Also classed as groove metal, industrial metal, and noise rock.
While She Sleeps	United Kingdom	Yes	Also classed as metalcore.
Within Temptation	Netherlands	Yes	Also classed as symphonic metal and gothic metal.
Zug Izland	United States	Yes	Also classed as alternative rock

== See also ==
- List of American grunge bands
- List of alternative rock artists
- List of experimental metal artists
- List of industrial metal bands
- List of nu metal bands
- List of post-grunge bands
