= No Silence For Sale =

- Genres: Rock, punk rock, alternative, skate punk, pop punk
- Years active: 1999–2004; 2011–present
- Members: Felix Deimel; Georg The-Hatschka; Raphael Beran
- Past members: Philip; Chris
- Website: Nosilenceforsale.com

No Silence For Sale is an Austrian rock band formed in Vienna, capital of Austria, in 1999 by Felix Deimel and Georg The-Hatschka. In 2001 Raphael Beran joined and the band continued as a trio. The band emerged from 1990s skate- punk culture with fast melodies combined with a radio-friendly kind of punk rock. After playing several shows as Support act of 3 Feet Smaller, Short, My Manner, No Head on My Shoulders and many more, the band declared an immediate, indefinite hiatus in January 2004.

== Reunion ==
In October 2011 the band announced their reunion on Facebook and started recording their first demos. After their announcement they played a number of shows as supporting act of Bam Margera, Dog Eat Dog, Defrage and many more. No Silence For Sale took a break from the road after May 2015 to begin pre-production for their debut album.

On February 26, 2016, they released their self-produced debut single "Tonight" worldwide.
