= List of post-grunge bands =

This is an alphabetical list of notable post-grunge bands.

== United States ==
- 3 Doors Down
- 10 Years
- 12 Stones
- Adema
- Alter Bridge
- Art of Anarchy
- Audioslave
- Axium
- Breaking Benjamin
- Breaking Point
- The Calling
- Candlebox
- Chevelle
- Cold
- Collective Soul
- Creed
- Crossfade
- Daughtry
- Days of the New
- Decyfer Down
- doubleDrive
- Dropbox
- Drowning Pool
- Dust for Life
- The Exies
- Flyleaf
- The Flys
- Foo Fighters
- Fuel
- Future Leaders of the World
- Godsmack
- Grey Daze
- Hinder
- Hoobastank
- Incubus
- Injected
- Kilgore
- Kutless
- Lifehouse
- Live
- Local H
- Marcy Playground
- Matchbox Twenty
- Modern Day Zero
- Oleander
- Operator
- The Pretty Reckless
- The Prom Kings
- Puddle of Mudd
- Red
- Rev Theory
- Saving Abel
- Seven Mary Three
- Shinedown
- Skillet
- Smile Empty Soul
- Socialburn
- Staind
- Stone Sour
- Switchfoot
- Tantric
- Trapt
- Trust Company
- The Verve Pipe

== Canada ==
- Default
- Evans Blue
- Finger Eleven
- My Darkest Days
- Nickelback
- Our Lady Peace
- Theory of a Deadman
- Three Days Grace

== United Kingdom ==
- Bush
- Feeder

== Australia ==
- Sick Puppies
- Silverchair

== South Africa ==
- Seether

== See also ==
- List of alternative rock artists
- List of alternative metal artists
- List of grunge bands
- List of American grunge bands
- List of nu metal bands
