= List of industrial music bands =

This is a list of notable bands who have produced industrial music or industrial rock. Separate lists are maintained of bands that predominately produce electro-industrial and industrial metal.

== 0-9 ==
- 16 Volt
- 3Teeth

== A ==
- à;GRUMH...
- Acumen Nation
- Android Lust
- Angelspit
- Attrition
- The Axis of Perdition

== B ==
- Babyland
- Bile
- Black Light Burns
- Birmingham 6
- Boyd Rice
- Brighter Death Now

== C ==
- Cabaret Voltaire
- Celldweller
- Chemlab
- Chrome
- Cindytalk
- The Clay People
- Clock DVA
- Coil
- Collide
- Combichrist
- Controlled Bleeding
- Crash Worship
- Crocodile Shop
- Crossbreed
- Crud
- Current 93

== D ==
- Das Ich
- Dawn of Ashes
- Deadsy
- DeathBoy
- Death in June
- Depeche Mode
- D'espairsRay
- Die Form
- Die Krupps
- Die Warzau
- Doubting Thomas
- dreDDup

== E ==
- Einstürzende Neubauten
- Emigrate
- Eve of Destiny

== F ==
- Feindflug
- Filter
- Flesh Field
- Foetus
- Front 242
- Front Line Assembly
- Funker Vogt

== G ==
- Genitorturers
- Godhead
- Godflesh
- Gravity Kills
- Greater Than One

== H ==
- Haujobb
- Head of David
- Hocico

== I ==
- Icon of Coil
- In Strict Confidence
- In the Nursery
- Informatik
- Insurge

== J ==
- Jerk

== K ==
- Kidneythieves
- Kill the Thrill
- Killing Joke
- KMFDM

== L ==
- Laibach
- Leæther Strip
- Lights of Euphoria

== M ==
- Machines of Loving Grace
- Marilyn Manson
- MDFMK
- Meat Beat Manifesto
- Ministry
- Missing Foundation
- Mortal
- Mortiis
- My Life With The Thrill Kill Kult

== N ==
- The Neon Judgement
- N17
- Nine Inch Nails
- Nitzer Ebb
- The Newlydeads
- Nocturnal Emissions
- Gary Numan
- Numb
- Nurse With Wound

== O ==
- Ohgr

== P ==
- Pailhead
- Peace, Love and Pitbulls
- Pig
- Pigface
- Pitchshifter
- Pop Will Eat Itself

== R ==
- Razed in Black
- The Retrosic
- Revolting Cocks
- Rorschach Test
- Rotersand
- Rx

== S ==
- Sheep on Drugs
- Sister Machine Gun
- Skinny Puppy
- Skold
- Skynd
- Snake River Conspiracy
- Snog
- Spahn Ranch
- SPK
- A Split-Second
- Stabbing Westward
- Static-X
- Street Sects
- Suicide Commando
- Swamp Terrorists
- Swans

== T ==
- Throbbing Gristle
- Tweaker

== U ==
- Undercover Slut

== V ==
- Vampire Rodents
- Velvet Acid Christ
- Videodrone
- VNV Nation
- Vomito Negro

== W ==
- Whitehouse
- Wumpscut

== X ==
- X Marks the Pedwalk

== Y ==
- Yelworc

== Z ==
- Zeromancer
- Z'ev

== See also ==
- List of industrial metal bands
- List of electro-industrial bands
- List of dark ambient artists
- List of drone artists
- List of noise musicians
