= M.VIIZ =

- Origin: Vientiane, Laos
- Genres: L-Pop, Pop
- Years active: 2024–present
- Label: Mirale Music

M.VIIZ is a Laotian girl group formed under the label Mirale Music. They are recognized as one of the prominent female music groups contributing to the growth and popularity of the L-pop music genre in Laos.

== History ==
M.VIIZ quickly gained public attention through their bright, modern pop style, emerging as a major force in the new generation of Laotian music. The group consists of seven female members skilled in both vocals and dance. Their debut releases received positive responses and rapidly accumulated a large following across social media platforms.

In addition to their domestic success, M.VIIZ has had opportunities to perform and participate in international music festivals, helping to elevate the profile of Laotian music on a broader scale.

== Discography ==
Title	Details / Notes
GenZ	Debut single / Breakthrough track
Waan (SWEET)	Remake of a 2000s rock/pop song by the band Cells
FOCUZ	Modern pop single
Sam Khan Tua Eng Phit ไป	Easy-listening pop track

== Members ==
M.VIIZ consists of seven members:

Name	Position / Notes
Sobaii	Leader, Main Vocalist
Nayana	Member
Thida	Face of the Group, Vocalist / Rapper
Pinky	Visual, Rapper
Namthip	Member
Kim Wui	Member
Yian Yii	Member
