= ...My Sombre Existence... =

...my sombre existence...

Studio album by Nervepitch
- Released: January 25, 2003
- Genre: Nu metal
- Length: 52:50
- Label: Self-released

Nervepitch chronology
...how we change (2001)	...my sombre existence... (2003)

...My Sombre Existence... (stylized as ...my sombre existence...) is the only studio album by Canadian nu metal band Nervepitch.

== Tracklisting ==
All tracks are written by Ryan Moonlight (except for track 3 written by Julius Snieder).

No.	Title	Length
1.	"Intro (My Sanctuary)"	1:06
2.	"It Ends Today"	5:16
3.	"Torn Apart"	5:41
4.	"Buried"	5:44
5.	"Stitches"	3:44
6.	"Interlude (Purity)"	2:01
7.	"Rest"	4:35
8.	"Sombre"	5:01
9.	"Seven"	4:33
10.	"Possessed"	4:13
11.	"Outro (My Final Moment)"	10:53
Total length:		52:50

Tracks 7 and 10 are re-recorded songs from their demo ep ...how we change.

== Personnel ==
- Ryan Moonlight – vocals
- Julius Snieder – guitar, keyboards
- John Telewiak – bass
- Scott (Scotty B) Brindley – drums

=== Other personnel ===
- Steve Donohoe – engineer
