= Vereor Deus, Non Dogma =

EP by Mayfly
- Released: February 11, 2014
- Genre: Christian metal, nu metal, alternative metal, progressive metal
- Length: 24:24
- Label: Voluminous

Vereor Deus, Non Dogma (Latin for Fear God, Not Dogma) is an extended play from Mayfly. Voluminous Records released the EP on February 11, 2014.

== Critical reception ==
Professional ratings
Review scores
Source	Rating
The Christian Music Review Blog	4/5 stars
Cross Rhythms	8/10 squares
HM Magazine	2/5 stars
Indie Vision Music	3/5 stars
Jesus Freak Hideout	3.5/5 stars
Jesus Wired	4/5 stars

Awarding the EP three and a half stars for Jesus Freak Hideout, Michael Weaver states, "Vereor Deus Non Dogma is nowhere close to perfect, but it does offer up quite a few enjoyable moments." Ian Webber, rating the EP an eight out of ten at Cross Rhythms, writes, "this short release is worth seeking out." Giving the EP two stars from HM Magazine, Collin Simula says, "this EP leaves the listener wanting much more."

Signaling in a three star review for Indie Vision Music, Lee Brown responds, "Mayfly brings a sound that is influenced by the past, but is perfectly timed to help shape the future of heavy music." Topher Parks, indicating in a four star review at Jesus Wired, recognizes, "Vereor Deus Non Dogma has its strengths as well as its flaws". Assigning the EP four stars from The Christian Music Review Blog, Brad Johnson replies, "the production quality on this EP was great, it was not excellent."

== Track listing ==
No.	Title	Length
1.	"Choice"	1:31
2.	"Infidel Castro" (featuring Betsi Ford)	4:18
3.	"Jihad" (featuring Darin Keim)	4:32
4.	"Eternal Respiration" (featuring Rachel Lacey)	2:56
5.	"Screaming Whispers"	0:31
6.	"Skylights" (featuring Rob Goad and Justin Moore)	3:09
7.	"Fiasco"	4:01
8.	"Eternal Respiration (J.E.S.S. Remix)"	3:26
Total length:		24:24
