= List of industrial metal bands =

This is a list of notable industrial metal bands.

== List of bands ==
- 16Volt
- 2wo
- 3Teeth
- Aborym
- Acumen Nation
- The Amenta
- American Head Charge
- Apollyon Sun
- Arkaea
- The Axis of Perdition
- Bile
- Bizarra Locomotiva
- Blacklodge
- Black Light Burns
- Black Magnet
- Blood from the Soul
- Blue Stahli
- Blut Aus Nord
- Celldweller
- Circle of Dust
- Clawfinger
- The Clay People
- Code Orange
- Combichrist
- Crossbreed
- Crud
- Cyanotic
- Cypecore
- Dagoba
- Deadstar Assembly
- Deathstars
- Death Therapy
- Device
- Dope
- Eisbrecher
- Emigrate
- Engel
- Fear Factory
- Filter
- Genitorturers
- Godflesh
- Gothminister
- Gravity Kills
- Hanzel und Gretyl
- Health (band)
- Heldmaschine
- In This Moment
- Julien-K (later)
- Kill II This
- Kill the Thrill
- Klank
- KMFDM
- The Kovenant
- Kreator (90's)
- Kryoburn
- Lindemann
- Machines of Loving Grace
- Malhavoc
- Marilyn Manson
- Meathook Seed
- Megaherz
- Ministry
- Misery Loves Co.
- Mnemic
- Mortal
- Motionless in White
- Mushroomhead
- N17
- Nailbomb
- Nine Inch Nails
- Nocturne
- Oomph!
- Pain
- Painflow
- Pitchshifter
- Powerman 5000
- Prong
- Punish Yourself
- Rabbit Junk
- Rammstein
- Raubtier
- Raunchy
- Red Harvest
- Revolting Cocks
- Rob Zombie
- Samael
- Scorn (early)
- Scum of the Earth
- Skin Chamber
- Skold
- Skrew
- Society 1
- Spineshank
- Static-X
- Strapping Young Lad
- Sub Dub Micromachine
- Sybreed
- Treponem Pal
- Tristwood
- Turmion Kätilöt
- Uniform
- White Zombie

== See also ==
- List of industrial music bands
- List of electro-industrial bands
