= Fear The Little People =

Studio album by King Mungi
- Released: December 1, 2001
- Genres: Nu metal; Funk Metal; Alternative Metal
- Length: 45:25
- Label: Rhythm Ace
- Producer: Stu Niven

King Mungi chronology
Fear The Little People (2001)	Something/Nothing (2003)

King Mungi studio album chronology
Fear The Little People (2001)	King Mungi (2016)

Fear The Little People is the debut studio album By Australian Nu metal band King Mungi

== Background ==
The album was a hit in the local Brisbane/Gold Coast, Queensland music scene with tracks such as "Languish" And "Bozo" being crowd pleasers

The recording process took 8 months to complete, Drummer Clayton Barnard Said in an interview “We actually mastered the CD last July and it’s taken this long to get it on the shelves. Things with artwork and injuries in the band, it’s just been a really long project. For us it’s the first thing we’ve released, so we’ve learned a lot from the process.”

The Song "Languish" Talks About A girl , whilst the track "Forta-Wan" is about being held at gunpoint with a drunk cop in PNG and the track "Bozo" is about Lead Vocalist Benjamin Whitecross and Bassist Cory Absel in Primary school.

Benjamin would later state in an interview "I read a story in the paper about a man in his 50's Who had been molested as a child. I thought the story was so sad and how terrible it would've been, So i wrote a song about it" the song in question is "Paedophile"

== Track Listing ==
All tracks are written by King Mungi.

No.	Title	Length
1.	"Languish"	2:50
2.	"Forta-Wan"	3:36
3.	"Bozo"	3:30
4.	"Foulbody"	5:00
5.	"K-Wire"	3:51
6.	"Backstabba"	3:59
7.	"Paedophile"	3:37
8.	"Smile"	5:55
9.	"(silence)"	0:09
10.	"Untitled" (Tracks 9 and 10 are hidden tracks)	12:58
Total length:		45:25

Track 10 is not mentioned anywhere on the album.

== Personnel ==
- Benjamin Whitecross - vocals
- Luke "Wolverine" Attrill - guitar
- Cory Absell - bass
- Clayton Barnard - drums
