= Flymore =

Russian nu metal band

- Genre: Nu metal
- Years active: 2002 – 2013
- Label: Right Recordings
- Members: Max "Frozt" Morozov; Igor "Fly" Mukhin; Paul "Rage" Jones; Gustaf "ThorBo" Bodén; Jonas "STORM" Blomqvist
- Website: www.flymoreband.com

Flymore was a Russian nu metal band from Ivanovo.

== History ==
Flymore was formed in Ivanovo, Russia, in 2002, after the split of another band, Millenium. It was founded by guitarist Igor "Fly" Muchin and vocalist Max "Frozt" Morozov. In 2009, they released their first studio album entitled "Millenium IV V," which was recorded on the label Right Recordings. One of the songs ("All The Time I Bled") was shot with a music video. On February 26, 2013, the band released an EP called "Mind Tricks".

== Discography ==
=== Studio albums ===
- Millenium IV V (2009)

=== EPs ===
- Mind Tricks (2013)

== Members ==
=== Final Lineup ===
- Max "Frozt" Morozov – vocals (2002–2013)
- Igor "Fly" Mukhin – guitar (2002–2013)
- Paul "Rage" Jones – bass guitar (2013)
- Gustaf "ThorBo" Bodén – drums (2013)
- Jonas "STORM" Blomqvist – guitar (2013)

=== Former ===
- Denis "Chek" Rybakov – bass guitar (2002–2013)
- Nikita Alekseev – guitar (2006–2013)
- Serj Yashin – drums (2011–2013)
- Serj Kulikov – drums (2005–2011)
- Dmitriy Kurin – drums (2002–2005)
