= Memorrhage =

Studio album by Memorrhage
- Released: June 16, 2023
- Recorded: November–December 2022
- Genre: Nu metal
- Length: 35:35
- Label: Big Money Cybergrind
- Producer: Garry Brents

Memorrhage chronology
Memorrhage (2023)	Anyo (2024)

Garry Brents chronology
Astral Corridors (2023; as Gonemage)	Memorrhage (2023)	Spell Piercings (2024; as Gonemage)

Memorrhage is the debut studio album by Memorrhage, a nu metal project by American musician Garry Brents (born October 4, 1987). Brents has also made music with the bands Gonemage, Homeskin, Cara Neir, Sallow Moth, and Prabstruse, amongst many others, since 2004. He also collaborated with Vision Eternel between 2010–2012. A variety of styles span these projects, including: black metal, death metal, grindcore, screamo, post-rock, and electronic music.

A follow-up album, Anyo, was released in August 2024.

== Writing and composition ==
According to Brents:

This album is a nostalgic tribute to growing up in the 90's with nu-metal as the first genre I latched on to, moved away from for nearly 20 years, and then came back to with more appreciation and love for the genre than I did as a kid. A lot of different sounds from the genre shape this album along with influences from other heavy music like industrial metal, grind, and metallic hardcore.

Each song on this album represents its own 'episode' like a sci-fi anthology with different perspectives revolving around cybernetics, time travel, mechs, and body horror. The vibe of Terminator 2 crossed with Hellraiser, Robotech, and Deus Ex.

The opening track, Memory Leak, was initially composed in a "very spontaneous moment" in 2022, before Brents had decided to create a full album. Lyrically, it concerns "an entity in a video game becoming sentient and causing a huge data leak, which affects other realities". The lyrics of Old Wave concern the emotions of an obsolete android accepting the fact that newer models supersede it. Reek focuses on the experience of a service robot aboard a spaceship, which eventually becomes displeased with the presence of humans, sending it into a deranged fury which leads to its takeover of the spacecraft.

Several tracks on the album have been compared to that of Mudvayne, Deftones, Car Bomb, Korn, Slipknot, Coal Chamber, Fear Factory and Spineshank. General influences from other genres such as industrial music and metalcore have also been noted.

A remarkably large roster of guest musicians are employed for almost all of the tracks on the album.

== Reception ==
The Toilet ov Hell gave the album an uncharacteristically positive review, describing it as "a testament to genre fandom, wrapped in an emotive cyberpunk aesthetic". Speaking for Metal Temple, Lesley-Ann Ang describes Memorrhage as "one to keep an eye out for". Josiah Aden of Noizze describes it as "a delicious mix of all the most exciting parts of nu metal". Gary Davidson of Echoes and Dust proclaims that "in his usual manner Garry Brents has picked a genre and packed a release full of all its aspects without overwhelming".

A less positive review was given by Tasha Brown of Distorted Sound Magazine, stating that "when an album goes full throttle so quickly, there’s very little room for it to do anything else" and that the album "would have served better as a series of EPs rather than a full-length".

== Track listing ==
No.	Title	Length
1.	"Memory Leak"	3:18
2.	"Exit"	3:33
3.	"Reek"	3:31
4.	"Finesse"	3:46
5.	"Old Wave"	2:52
6.	"Lost"	1:37
7.	"Knurl"	3:10
8.	"Brain Wield"	4:23
9.	"Lunge"	3:16
10.	"Utility"	4:18
11.	"Ex-Sprite"	2:51
Total length:		35:35

== Personnel ==
Adapted from the album's page on Bandcamp.

Memorrhage

- Garry Brents - lead vocals, instruments, FX, production (recording/mixing)

Guest musicians

- Adam Bailey - additional high vox on 2, 3 (Narakah)
- Aki McCullough - additional high vox on 2, 7, 8 (Dreamwell)
- beeb. music - vocal intro on 8
- Billy Hinton - vocal intro on 8
- Christian Degn - vocal scream intro on 2 (Moray)
- Fire-Toolz - additional high vox on 4, 5
- Ilya Mirosh - lead clean vox on 9, 10
- Kierzo - additional shouting vox on 8
- Leo Ashline - vocal intro on 8 (Street Sects)
- Lizzy Venom of The Watchyrz - vocal intro on 8
- Mike Gardell - vocal intro on 8 (Miséricorde)
- Mr. Rager - DJ scratches on 3, 4, 5, 6, 7, 8, 9 (Diego Juarez)
- Nick Hertzberg - ending vocal shouts on 10 (Wet Cassettes)
- Sakura Pups - additional high vox on 7
- Schuler Benson - additional low/high vox on 2 (Trocar)
- Stilgar - additional clean vox on 5, 10 (Thecodontion)
- The Ember, The Ash - additional low/high vox on 2, 9
- tttlllrrr - DJ scratches/sampling on 10, 11
- VoidDweller - additional shouting vox on 8, lead vox & lyrics on 11

Personnel

- Cristian "AbueloRetroWave" Aranda - cover art
- Angel Marcloid - mastering
