= Undercover Slut =

French rock band

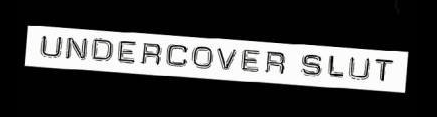

Background information
- Origin: Paris, France
- Genres: Shock rock; glam punk; gothic rock; deathrock
- Years active: 1995–present
- Labels: Offensive Records
- Members: 'O'

Undercover Slut, also known as UCS and stylised as VNDERCOVER SLVT, is a French-American shock rock and glam punk group, based in Paris. Throughout the history of the band, there have been multiple line-up changes and nearly thirty people have been involved with the band; while certain musicians contribute to music, vocals and lyrics, 'O' remains the only constant member.

Although the group are most often referred to as a form of industrial music and indeed used that as part of their sound, they also implement strong elements of punk rock influence and gothic rock, topped off with an image similar to glam rock. Undercover Slut have been a feature in underground music, particularly in Europe since the 1990s, though they have also toured the United States several times. In terms of musical releases, the band has put out many self-produced recordings, their first official full-length album was Communism Is Fascism released in 2004, which has gained them attention.

== Sound and image ==
The group play have been covered by glam media sources, and even had songs released on a couple glam compilations for USA's Delinquent Records. This is most likely because of their image, which incorporates heavy use of make-up.

Undercover Slut's make-up bears a resemblance to that of the geisha, with striking white foundation topped off with bright red lipstick and black eye make-up. Due to darker elements of Glam in their image, the band are sometimes compared to Marilyn Manson by media who are not familiar with the band. However, Undercover Slut have stated strong opposition to that group, dismissing Brian Warner as a "clown" and quipping "That 'god of fat' needs to call it quits".

== Animal rights and philanthropy ==
'O' is passionate about campaigning for animal rights, and is said to be devout vegetarian, Undercover Slut even has a section dedicated to them on the Animal Liberation Front website, as well as an interview discussing their beliefs.

=== Communism Is Fascism ===
In interviews 'O' often refers to their hometown as "Psychotic Paris, Fucked-up France".

=== The White Whore era and Amerikkka Macht Frei ===
In September 2007, Undercover Slut started pre-production at Next Level Studio in Los Angeles with producer Stevo Bruno (Brides of Destruction, Mötley Crüe), then recorded and mixed their brand new album Amerikkka Macht Frei at the Chop Shop in Los Angeles with producer Chris Baseford. The thirteen track album, set to include a cover version of The Cure's "Killing an Arab", also features some guest musicians. Matthew Roberts (Charles Manson's son) is featured in a spoken word duet with 'O' on the track "Jesus Kills! Coroner Saves!", Eric Griffin (Synical, ex-Murderdolls, Wednesday 13) plays lead guitar on the track "Kastration Kar Krashes" and Teddy Heavens (Rebel Rebel, Los Angeles Death Dolls) plays lead guitar on "Dali Was a Junkie".

== Members ==
=== Current ===
- 'O' - lead and background vocals

== Discography ==
=== Albums ===
- Haters Gonna Hate (10-song LP) Offensive Records 2020
- Amerikkka Macht Frei (10-song cassette tape) Offensive Records 2018
- Amerikkka Macht Frei (12-song white Vinyl LP) Offensive Records / Deadlight / Underclass 2010
- Amerikkka Macht Frei (12-song black Vinyl LP) Offensive Records / Deadlight / Underclass 2010
- Amerikkka Macht Frei (13-track enhanced Digipack CD w/ uncensored "Shadow Song" video) Offensive Records / Deadlight / Underclass 2010
- Amerikkka Macht Frei (12-track enhanced CD w/ uncensored "Shadow Song" video) Offensive Records / Sounds 2008
- Communism Is Fascism (15-track enhanced CD w/ "Legalize Suicide" video) Hateful Society Production / Apocalypse / Season Of Mist 2004
- Communism Is Fascism (15-track enhanced CD w/ "Legalize UCS" video - DVD Box) Hateful Society Production / Apocalypse / Season Of Mist 2004

=== EPs ===
- The NKF Sessions (3-track CD) Offensive Records 2018
- Inside That Cult That Loves Terror (6-track Digipak CD) Offensive Records 2016
- Thirty Minutes Kills (7-track CD) Scream 2016
- VICE (3-track CD) Offensive Records 2014
- Hollywood Noir (3-song Vinyl LP) Offensive Records / Diess Prod / Musicast 2008
- The White Whore Era EP (6-track CD) Offensive Records 2006
- The Van Gogh Disease (6-track CD) Offensive Records 2006
- Drama-Sick Democra-Sin (3-track enhanced CD w/ "Darling Darling" video) Hateful Society Production / Free-Will / Musicast 2005
- Our Legalize Suicide Sessions (3-track CD) Hateful Society Production 2003
- Naziconographick: Terrorism Tracks For Nihilistic Numbers (7-track CD) Hateful Society Production 2002
- Sadistic Sampler (9-track CD) Hateful Society Production 2000
- Undercover Slut (cassette tape) Hateful Society Production 1999
- Lipstikk Whore No. 666 (cassette tape) Hateful Society Production 1998
- Foreplay... (cassette tape) Hateful Society Production 1995

=== Singles ===
- Comart (Digital Single) Offensive Records 2025 *Chaos! (Digital Single) Offensive Records 2024
- Black Phillip (Digital Single) Offensive Records 2017
- Only Sick Music Makes Money Today (2-Song 7" Clear Vinyl) Offensive Records 2017
- Chloroform Nation (1-Track Digipak CD) Offensive Records 2015
- Chloroform Nation (iTunes Single) Offensive Records 2015
- Evil Star Virus (1-Track CD) Hateful Society Production 2002
- Addicted, Obsessed & Possessed (2-Song Cassette Tape) Hateful Society Production 1996

=== Demos ===
- Fuck That Celebrity Trash & Your Ghetto Cunt Drama (7-track CD) Hateful Society Production 2004
- Lipstikk Whore N°666 (12-track CD) Scream (Japan) 2000

=== Split CDs ===
- Rebel Slut (6-track Split CD w/ Rebel Rebel) FTW Records & Filmworks / CafePress (U.S.A.) 2005

=== Compilations ===
- Kinryu-No-Mai - Tribute And Support To Japan Nos Prod. (Japan) 2011
- Generation Dead - A Compilation From The Dark Side Of Music Dead Records (Australia) 2010
- Riot On Sunset - Vol. 1 - Soundtrack To The Underground 272 Records (U.S.A.) 2007
- Lost Anarchy - Volume No. 2: Mojo World Disorder Demons In Exile Records (U.S.A.) 2006
- Lost Anarchy - Volume 1: Buy Or Die! Demons In Exile Records (U.S.A.) 2005
- An Hour With Bubblegum Slut Bubblegum Slut (U.K.) 2002
- Lipstikk Killerz - Vol. 1 Lollypop Records (France) 1998
- The Pink And The Black - a goth & glam collection Delinquent Records (U.S.A.) 1998
- It's Only Indie Rock N' Roll But I Like It!!! - Compilation 2 Delinquent Records (U.S.A.) 1996
