= Wirefall =

Alternative rock band

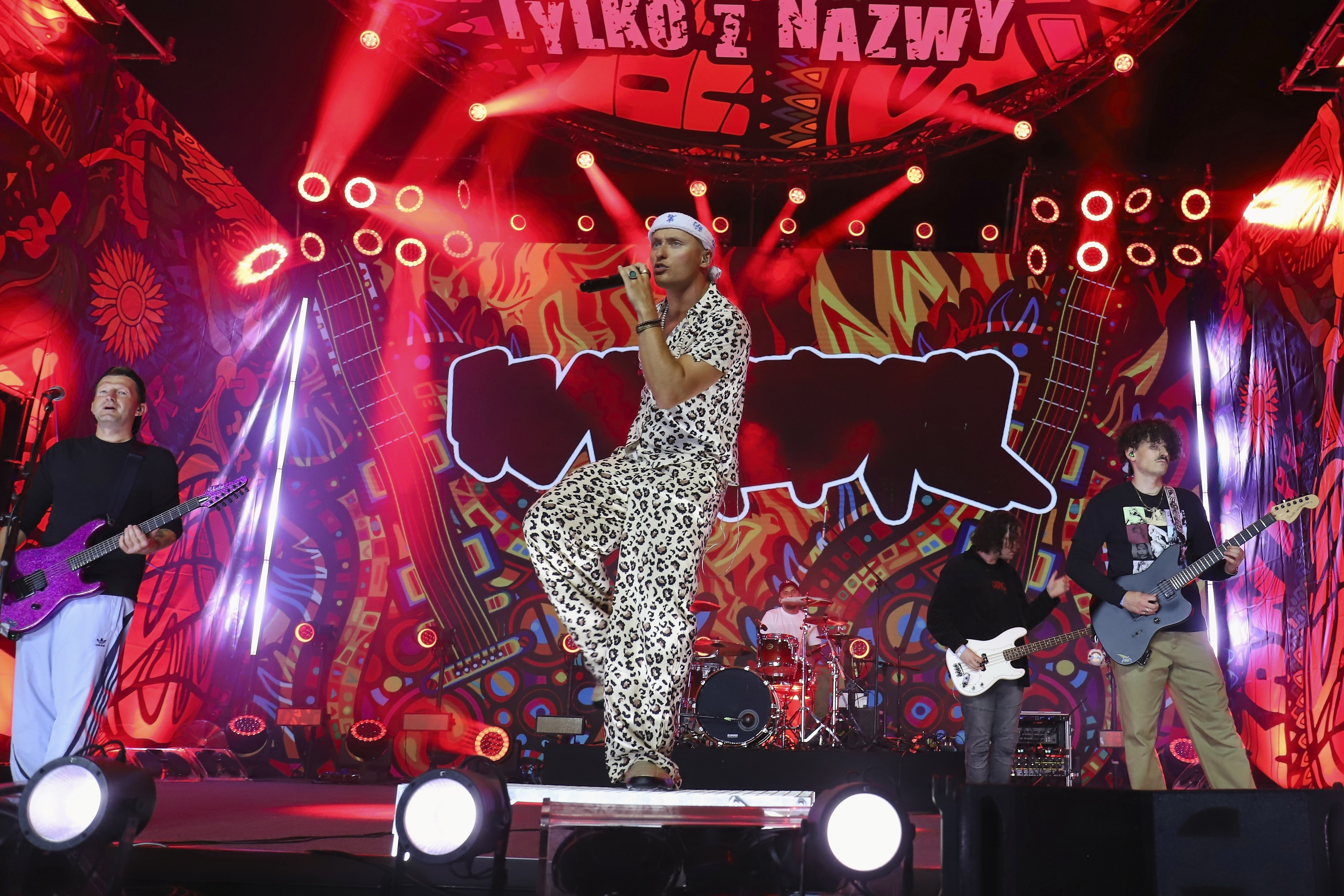
- Wirefall performing at Pol'and'Rock 2025

Background information
- Origin: Poland
- Years active: 2022–present
- Members: Tomasz Piesiak (Guitar, SFX); Konrad Garula (Vocal); Konrad Kral (Bass, Guitar); Paweł Godzik (Drums)
- Past members: Mateusz Augustyn (Vocal); DJ Mysterons
- Website: wirefallband.com

Wirefall is a Polish alternative rock band formed in Kraków, Poland. The band combines elements of alternative metal, nu metal, and hip-hop, creating a distinctive sound that blends heavy guitar riffs with contemporary rhythms and electronic influences. The group gained national attention in October 2024 after winning Antyfest, a rock talent competition organized by Antyradio, where they competed against over 500 bands.

== History ==
Wirefall was formed in 2022 by guitarist and vocalist Tomasz Piesiak after the breakup of his previous musical projects. Seeking collaborators for a new creative project, Piesiak connected with bassist and composer Dariusz Ociepka through a social media post. The two quickly bonded over a shared admiration for Slipknot and began developing the band's sound.

In 2023 the lineup expanded with the addition of rapper Mateusz Augustyn, guitarist Konrad Kral, and drummer Paweł Godzik, each contributing unique elements to the group.

In April 2024 DJ Mysterons joined the band, introducing electronic influences that further diversified their musical style.

In June 2024, Wirefall released their debut album titled Retina, which showcased their fusion of genres and established their presence in the Polish music scene.

On 25 October 2024 the band won the 2024 edition of Antyfest, held in Warsaw, Poland. The victory earned the group promotional support from Antyradio, possibility to record an album at Izabelin Studio, and the rare opportunity to perform at the Poland's biggest music stage, the 2025 Pol'and'Rock Festival.

== Style ==
Wirefall's music blends alternative metal and nu metal with hip-hop and electronic influences. Their sound features heavy guitar riffs, dynamic vocals, and rhythmic experimentation, reflecting a synthesis of past and contemporary musical styles.

== Discography ==
| Year | Song | Type |
|---|---|---|
| 2022 | The Moth | Single |
| 2023 | Time Machine | Single |
| 2023 | Soy Sauce | Single |
| 2023 | Cracks | Single |
| 2023 | SPF | Single |
| 2024 | No Tomorrow | Single |
| 2024 | Retina | Album |
| 2025 | Hide and Seek | Single |
| 2026 | Rise and Shine | Single |

== Award and recognition ==
- 2024 – Winner of the 2024 edition of Antyradio's Antyfest
- 2025 – Best newcomer band in Poland
