= Sunshine (Liquid Gang album) =

Studio album by Liquid Gang
- Released: 15 August 2000
- Genre: Post-grunge; nu metal; alternative rock
- Length: 43:44
- Label: Lava; Atlantic
- Producer: Malcolm Springer

Liquid Gang chronology
Nineteenth Soul (1999)	Sunshine (2000)

Sunshine is the second studio album by American alternative rock band Liquid Gang, and their first to be released on a major label.

== Reception ==
Rock Hard magazine gave the record a positive review. An 8/12 review came from VISIONS.de, describing parts of the album as strenuous, but overall interesting.

A review from Iowa State Daily was less enthusiastic about Sunshine, describing it as "frivolous" and stating that the band had "sold out from the start". Matt Capuano, writing for The Daily Titan, provided a much more positive review, comparing several aspects of the band to that of other nu metal bands such as Korn, Orgy, Deftones and Sevendust.

A retrospective mention of the album in a 2019 article written by Axl Rosenberg of MetalSucks highlighted the instrumentation but criticised the vocals on the closing song "Blunt Force Trauma": "The riff ... is sufficiently heavy to make it kind of a bummer when the frontman starts doing a Sonny Sandoval."

== Track listing ==
No.	Title	Length
1.	"Breakdown"	4:01
2.	"Closer"	3:54
3.	"Show Me"	3:15
4.	"A Better View"	3:33
5.	"Rain"	3:30
6.	"Drama"	3:47
7.	"Diagram"	3:49
8.	"Ready & Able"	4:29
9.	"I Applaud You"	3:17
10.	"Would You"	4:06
11.	"Blunt Force Trauma" (contains hidden track after silence)	6:03
Total length:		43:44
