= King Mungi =

Australian Nu metal band

KING MUNGI
- The Bands Original Line Up in 2001 Cory Absell (Back Left) Clayton Barnard (Back Right) Luke Attrill (Front Left) Benjamin Whitecross (Front Right)

Background information
- Origin: Gold Coast, Queensland, Australia
- Genres: Nu metal, Alternative rock, Rock, Funk Metal
- Years active: 1999-2005, 2006-2015, 2016, 2021-Present
- Labels: Rhythm Ace, Bozo Records, Self-released
- Members: Benjamin Whitecross; Clayton Barnard; Ryan Swierczewski; Nathan Parmigiani; Ross Newman
- Past members: Cory Absel; Luke Attrill; Chris Burt; Scott Wilson

King Mungi (stylized as KING MUNGI) is an australian Nu metal band from Gold Coast, Queensland

== History ==
In 98-99 Lead Vocalist Benjamin Whitecross had written a bunch of songs and started jamming with bassist Cory Absel who was a long time friend of Benjamin. A lot of the bands early demos were very Incubus sounding just a little bit heavier.

Not long after moving to Gold Coast Benjamin later would be roommates with Drummer Scott Wilson and he decided to form a 3 piece, after a couple of gigs they befriended a band named "Sonny Black" and Clayton Barnard was the drummer for the band, not long after Scott would leave the band and clay was happy to fill in. Lead Guitarist Luke Attrill was the Main Vocals/Guitar for another band they shared a stage with.

The meaning of the band's name "King Mungi" is "King Little Man". Benjamin Whitecross would later tell on an interview "Papua New Guinea is rife with corruption and during my time there my family knew of 15 murders by locals for being in the wrong place in the wrong time."

The band's first gig would be at "The Alliance Hotel" on a Sunday afternoon. around 50 people were attending the show and it made the band becoming a somewhat common name in the Brisbane/Gold Coast area.

On December 1, 2001, the band released their debut album "Fear The Little People" The album was praised by critics and fans alike Tracks like "Languish" and "Bozo" were crowd pleasers and favourites among the fans. The track "Languish" was given a music video. the band went on tour all across Australia

On February 17, 2002, the band would release their debut EP titled "Something/Nothing". They debuted the song at the Troccadero, Surfers Paradise

The band went on tour and playing for The Big Day Out Performance on January 19, 2003, with the crowd singing along to their songs, around 3000 people attended their performance.

Later Guitarist Luke Attrill would leave the band and was replaced by Chris Burt who brought along a more melodic sound to the band. Shortly after, the band would hype up an upcoming album alongside a teaser song titled "Attack Of The Clones" which would be posted on their socials.

Soon After on March 7, 2005, the band would release their second EP Titled "To Celebrate This Last Day" after this the band would disband going on hiatus.

Later in 2016, the band would reform and release their second studio album "King Mungi" on September 2, 2016. The songs "Take What I Have" and "May As Well Be Dead" were released with music videos to promote the album. The band would perform on the Overcranked Festival Touring Alongside Konkhra, Blood Duster and Alchemist (band). They would also be a supporting act for the band Superheist on the Don't Call It A Comeback Festival Before going into hiatus.

The band would post on face book and announced a reunion on 14th July 2021 and went on the "Unite The Fight" festival and played with A Somerset Parade, The Silencio, Grizzlyshark, Vibrations From The Void and bridge to nowhere

In 2026 after the resurgence of Nu metal the band went from having a couple hundred listeners per month to now over 10K streams, the band announced on their Facebook about section that new music would be released in the foreseeable future. Lead Vocalist Benjamin stated "I've always wanted to re-record FTLP (Fear The Little People) so it may be on the cards" he also stated "I have tonne of new songs just waiting for the perfect time."

== Members ==
- Benjamin Whitecross - vocals (1999–2005, 2006–2015, 2016, 2021-Present)
- Clayton Barnard - drums (1999–2005, 2006–2015, 2016, 2021-Present)
- Ryan Swierczewski - bass (2016, 2021–Present)
- Nathan Parmigiani - guitar (2016, 2021–Present)
- Ross Newman - guitar (2016, 2021–Present)

=== Former Members ===
- Luke "Wolverine" Attrill - guitar (1999–2004)
- Cory Absel (Sometimes Credited as Corey Absel) - bass (1999–2005)
- Chris Burt - guitar (2005)
- Scott Wilson - drums (1999)

== Discography ==
=== Albums ===
- Fear The Little People (2001, Rhythm Ace)
- King Mungi (2016, MGM/ not on label)

=== EPs ===
- Something/Nothing (2003, Rhythm Ace)
- To Celebrate This Last Day (2005, Bozo Records)
