= Mayfly (band) =

American Christian metal band

- Origin: Dayton, Ohio
- Genres: Christian metal, nu metal, alternative metal, progressive metal
- Years active: 2011–2017
- Labels: Voluminous
- Members: Tony Ford; Jared Lacey; Jeff Book; Adam Thompson
- Past members: Clifford Deweese; Joel Holycross; Joliffe Huber
- Website: mayflysounds.com

Mayfly was an American Christian metal band from Dayton, Ohio, formed in 2011. They have released one extended play, Vereor Deus, Non Dogma, in 2014, with Voluminous Records. On March 14, 2017, the band announced that had disbanded.

== Background ==
Mayfly is a Christian metal band from Dayton, Ohio, forming in 2012. Their members are vocalist and bassist, Tony Ford, vocalists and guitarists, Jared Lacey and Jeff Book, and drummer, Adam Thompson. The bands past members were Clifford Deweese from July 2012 until October 2012, Joel Holycross from March 2012 until October 2015, and Joliffe Huber from March 2015 until July 2015.

== Music history ==
The band formed in 2012, with their first single, "Eternal Respiration", that was released in October 2012. Their first extended play, Vereor Deus, Non Dogma, Latin for "'Fear God, Not Dogma,'" was released on February 11, 2014, with Voluminous Records.

== Members ==
Current members

- Tony Ford – vocals, bass
- Jared Lacey – vocals, guitar
- Jeff Book – vocals, guitar
- Adam Thompson – drums

Former members

- Clifford Deweese (July 2012-October 2012)
- Joel Holycross (March 2012-October 2015)
- Joliffe Huber (March 2015-July 2015)

== Discography ==
EPs

- Vereor Deus, Non Dogma (February 11, 2014, Voluminous Records)
