= Miocene (band) =

- Origin: London, England
- Genres: Alternative rock; alternative metal; progressive metal; art rock; nu metal
- Years active: 1997–2006
- Labels: Infernal, Corporate Risk
- Past members: Ben; Graham; Alex; Leo

Miocene, also typeset as {MIOCENE}, was an English rock band from London.

== Early days ==
Forming in 1998, but consolidating their line-up in 2000, Miocene came to the attention of the manager and promoter Keith Eccles of Keith's Back Yard, and after a series of well-reviewed London shows and a self-organised UK tour with the rockers Hundred Reasons, signed to Dante Bonutto's Infernal Records label.

== Refining the Theory ==
Miocene's first release with Infernal Records was Refining the Theory in 2000 (produced by Dave Chang). This was a compilation of the songs that the band had written to date and was primarily nu-metal in style. It was well received by critics, receiving 4Ks in Kerrang! and 9/10 in Metal Hammer magazines. One song, "Fits Like That", was selected in November 2000 for inclusion on the Kerrang! cover CD, Incoming – The Sounds of 2001.

This record was supported with a five-date tour with Clutch, an extensive three-month tour with the UK Trip Rockers Sunna, and the Britpop trio Crackout, and selected shows with bands such as Earthtone9, One Minute Silence, Raging Speedhorn and Charger; and a headline tour supported by Porcelain Roach.

== Cellular Memory ==
Influenced from Squarepusher and DJ Shadow, the band released a downbeat EP called Cellular Memory in 2002. The record was hailed as a brave departure by Kerrang! and Rocksound, and Miocene toured extensively in support of this record with SikTh and The Kennedy Soundtrack.

== A Perfect Life with a View of the Swamp ==
Miocene spent three years writing A Perfect Life with a View of the Swamp, which was intended as a culmination and a progression of both previous releases. Featuring 10+ minute progressive metal pieces, as well as short spoken word pieces and long electronic instrumentals, the album was released on Corporate Risk Products in 2005. The album received positive reviews in the press, but before the album could be toured, the bands' bass guitarist left and the album was never toured.

On 10 April 2006, it was announced via the band's MySpace page that Miocene had disbanded.

== Discography ==
=== Studio albums ===
- Refining the Theory (2000) (Infernal Records) mini-LP
- Cellular Memory (2002) (Infernal Records) EP
- A Perfect Life with a View of the Swamp (2005) (Corporate Risk Products) album

=== Live albums ===
- Live at Camden Monarch (2003) (bootleg)
