= A Cry Farewell =

US musical group

A Cry Farewell was an American rap metal/nu metal band formed in Cincinnati, Ohio in 2009. The band's musical style evolved from a hard rock sound to more of a rap metal sound by the following year. Following the release of "The Offering" and hit single "Nothing Left" in 2010, the band was featured by The New Review as one of the fastest rising hard rock acts in the nation. Since their formation, they've completed a national tour with Digital Summer and Universal/Republic records artist 10 Years, released a 5 track EP entitled The Offering, and have had 3 of their songs (Nothing Left, Open My Eyes and The Road) appear on numerous national radio stations, including Sirius XM Radio. The Offering was produced by grammy nominated producer Travis Wyrick (P.O.D., 10 Years, Disciple), who also produced their brand new full-length album The War Goes On which came out on December 20, 2011.

== History ==
=== Formation and The Offering (2009-2010) ===
A Cry Farewell started in December 2009 when lead singer Josh Doyle's wife suggested he meet with guitarist Devon Leonard and start a band. Trevor Metcalf was then invited by Doyle and Leonard to join full time on bass guitar. Still without a drummer, they hired ex-Pillar drummer Lester Estelle II, to record session drums on The Offering. After the recording process, they sought out drummer Danny Hutchinson to round out the line up.

The Offering was released on August 31, 2010. For a short period, the band decided to stream mp3 versions of the track for free from the band's website, as part of their "Offering" to the public. Since then, the band has been featured in HM Magazine, Flip Side to Music magazine, and The New Review.

=== National Tour and Debut Album (2010-2012) ===
In the final months of 2010, the band filmed their official music video for their single Nothing Left. The video was co-written by Doyle and Hutchinson and directed by Hutchinson. Shortly afterwards, the band were guests on a special 2-hour radio interview on Cincinnati's WMWX ClassX. During the interview, the band stated that the new album would be a continuation of The Offering, but a little more on the aggressive side.

In February 2011, they embarked on a national tour with Digital Summer and 10 Years in support of their latest album, Feeding the Wolves. After the tour, the band finished writing their upcoming album, which they recorded in spring/summer of 2011. The album, entitled "The War Goes On" was released on December 20, 2011.

In early January 2012, Randy Lorenz was added as a 2nd guitarist to the line up. In March of the same year, bassist Trevor Metcalf announced he would be leaving the band after their CD release show on March 16. In August of that year, drummer Danny Hutchinson and guitarist Randy Lorenz both decided to leave as well. The band disbanded shortly after.

== Band members ==
- Josh Doyle - Vocals
- Devon Leonard - Guitar
- Trevor Metcalf - Bass Guitar
- Danny Hutchinson - Drums
- Randy Lorenz - Guitar

== Discography ==
Studio Albums

- The War Goes On (2011)

EPs

- The Offering (2010)

Demos

- A Random Act of Defiance (2010)

== Videography ==
- Nothing Left (2011)
