= Nervepitch =

NervePitch
- From left to right: Brindley, Telewiak, Moonlight, Sneider

Background information
- Origin: Oshawa, Ontario, Canada
- Genre: Nu metal
- Years active: 1999-2003
- Label: Independent
- Past members: Ryan Moonlight; Julius Sneider; John 'Johnny T' Telewiak; Scott 'Scotty B' Brindley
- Website: www.nervepitch.com

Nervepitch (stylized as NervePitch) was a Canadian nu metal band from Oshawa, Ontario.

== History ==
Nervepitch was formed by bassist John Telewiak and vocalist Ryan Moonlight. After their band NeedleRust broke up, Telewiak and Moonlight wanted to "form a band with some bounce".

The band recorded their debut demo CD in three days and released ...How We Change on January 20, 2001.

By March 2001 the song "Rest" was nominated on Farmclub.com for consideration but they didn't get picked.

In January 25, 2003 The band released their only studio album ...My Sombre Existence... and became a local hit. Sometime in 2003 their friend and manager at the time Kyle sent the album to someone at Roadrunner Records. Someone at Roadrunner came out to see them in Toronto one night. Johnny recalls their manager saying “What I remember is being told by our manager that Roadrunner wanted a singer/singing style similar to another one of their bands,” and adding “This ultimately, I believe, was the beginning of the end for us. It was shattering for Ryan to be told that.” After this, they quietly disbanded. Some of the band members moved on to other bands, whilst vocalist Ryan Moonlight became a firefighter after Nervepitch.

On January 23rd 2015, lead vocalist Ryan Moonlight died in his home in Whitby, Ontario. His death was reported to be a suicide.

== Members ==
- Ryan Moonlight - vocals (1999–2003; died 2015)
- Julius Sneider - guitar, synths (1999–2003)
- John 'Johnny T' Telewiak - bass (1999–2003)
- Scott 'Scotty B' Brindley - drums, percussion (1999–2003)

== Discography ==
Release Date	Title	Label
January 20, 2001	...How We Change	Self-released
January 25, 2003	...My Sombre Existence...	Self-released

=== ...How We Change ===
1. Intro - A Dark Seed Is Born
2. Rest
3. All For Nothing
4. Interlude - Moment : Cold
5. Possessed
6. Outro - In Dark Tranquility I Lay
