= Nate James (disambiguation) =

Nate James is an English singer-songwriter.

Nathan, Nate or Nathaniel James may also refer to:

- USS Nathan James, a fictional ship in The Last Ship
- Nate James (American football) (born 1945), American football player
- Nate James (basketball) (born 1977), American basketball player and coach
- Nathan James (footballer) (born 2004), Thai footballer
- Nathaniel James (footballer) (born 2004), Trinidadian footballer
- Nathan James (English musician), vocalist for the UK hard rock band Inglorious
