= Years Since the Storm =

American metal band

- Origin: Holyoke, Massachusetts, U.S.
- Genres: Metalcore, nu metal, deathcore(early)
- Years active: 2007-2014
- Label: Artery Recordings
- Past members: Joe Baumgarten; Nick Demaro; Chris Misale; Joel Barlar; Robert McTaggart; Eric Jespersen; Jeremy Toce; Colin McEachern; Troy Wilson; Eric Snapper; Taylor Mark; Donnie Andrich; Kyle Wesolowski; Brendan Bowidas

Years Since the Storm was an American nu metalcore band from Holyoke, Massachusetts founded in 2007. The band is signed to Artery Recordings.

Since the band's inception in western New England they have released two full lengths, one of which was self-released. One EP, and a single titled "Gravity."

== History ==
=== Formation & "Left Floating In the Sea." (2007 - 2009) ===
Years Since the Storm was founded in Enfield, Connecticut, before their relocation to Holyoke, Massachusetts. Founding member and original drummer Kyle Wesolowski took a trip to New Orleans, Louisiana a couple years after Hurricane Katrina hit the city. After driving through the neighborhoods & witnessing the devastation & destruction it brought to the city it spawned the name Years Since the Storm. Soon after Years Since the Storm became an official band, Eric Snapper was recruited by Kyle to play for the band.

=== "To The Clouds" EP (2010 - 2012) ===
After playing countless amounts of local shows in support of "Left Floating In the Sea" and continuing through several member changes, the group started to write music again. With this came the release of the single "Still Waters" in October 2010. They continued to write and later hit the studio with Zakk Cervini, producing the 6 song EP entitled "To The Clouds," released November 2011. The group gained fans regionally and nationally and began to tour the east coast in an attempt to build an even larger fan-base. Soon after, however, vocalist Nick Demaro decided to step down from the band. This began a long and grueling search for a new vocalist, making 2012 a very quiet year for Years Since the Storm.

=== Re-Birth and "Gravity" (2013) ===
2013 saw new life for Years Since the Storm. With the addition of vocalist Donnie Andrich came the release of new single and music video "Gravity." Showing off a new style heavily influenced by the genre Nu-Metal, this was a new Years Since the Storm.

=== Artery Recordings and "Hopeless Shelter" (2014) ===
In January 2014, Years Since the Storm announced their signing with Artery Recordings, as well as the release of a new single entitled "Mindf*ck," and the release date of their upcoming full length "Hopeless Shelter" to be released on March 18, 2014. In February they released the single (Sin)ical. On March 18 they released their debut Artery Recordings full length "Hopeless Shelter."

=== Indefinite Hiatus/Breakup ===
The band remained inactive since late 2014 and there has been no update since and this could only assume that the band is now disbanded.

== Discography ==
- 2009: Demo 2009 (Demo)
- 2009: Left Floating In the Sea
- 2011: To The Clouds (EP)
- 2013: Gravity (Single)
- 2014: Hopeless Shelter

== Members ==
=== Final line-up ===
- Kyle Wesolowski - drums (2008–2014)
- Eric Snapper - guitar (2008-2014)
- Colin McEachern - bass (2012-2014)
- Donnie Andrich - vocals (2012-2014)
- Troy Wilson - guitar (2013-2014)

=== Past members ===
- Chris Misale - guitar (2008-2009)
- Joe Baumgarten - vocals (2008-2010)
- Eric Jespersen - bass (2008-2010)
- Joel Barlar - guitar (2009-2010)
- Nick Demaro - vocals (2010-2011)
- Jeremy Toce - bass (2010-2012)
- Robert McTaggart - guitar (2010-2013)
