= Manapart =

Armenian-Russian metal band

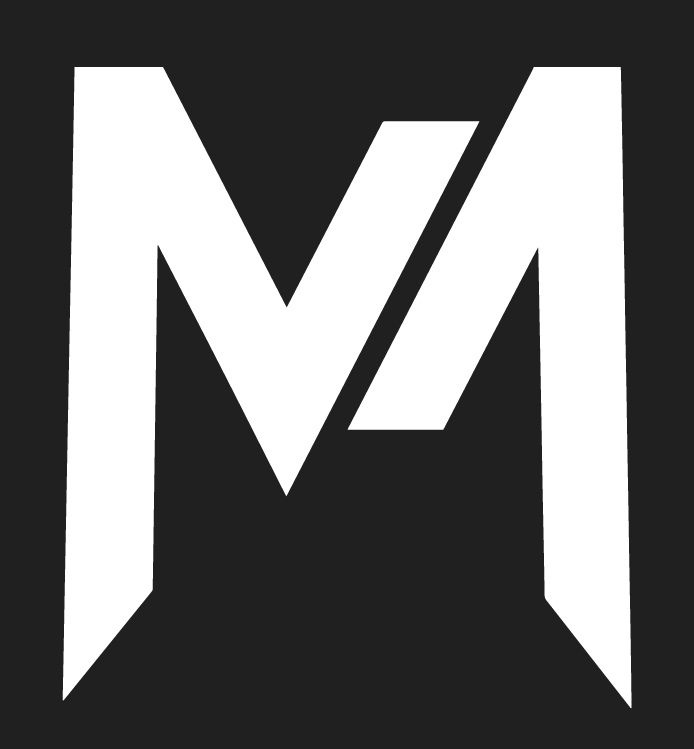

Background information
- Origin: Saint Petersburg, Russia
- Genres: Alternative metal, nu metal, heavy metal, hard rock, progressive metal
- Years active: 2018 – present
- Label: Touch Music
- Members: Artem Popov; Arman Babaian; Zakhariy Zurabian; Ivan Yakushin
- Website: manapart.net

Manapart is an Armenian-Russian nu-metal band formed in 2018 in St. Petersburg, Russia.

== History ==
In 2016, a cover band called "Wishup band" was founded, which included Artem Popov, Arman Babaian, Zakhariy Zurabian, and Peter Zubkov. The band mainly performed covers of System of a Down songs, shot several videos, and in this group they gave 3 concerts in St. Petersburg and Moscow. In 2018 the band decided to create their own music and give up covers.

In 2018 in St. Petersburg, Artem Popov (vocals), Arman Babaian (lead guitar), and Zakhariy Zurabian (drums) founded the band "Manapart", which was later joined in 2021 by Ivan Yakushin (bass guitar, backing vocals).

In November 2020, the band released their debut album consisting of 9 songs.

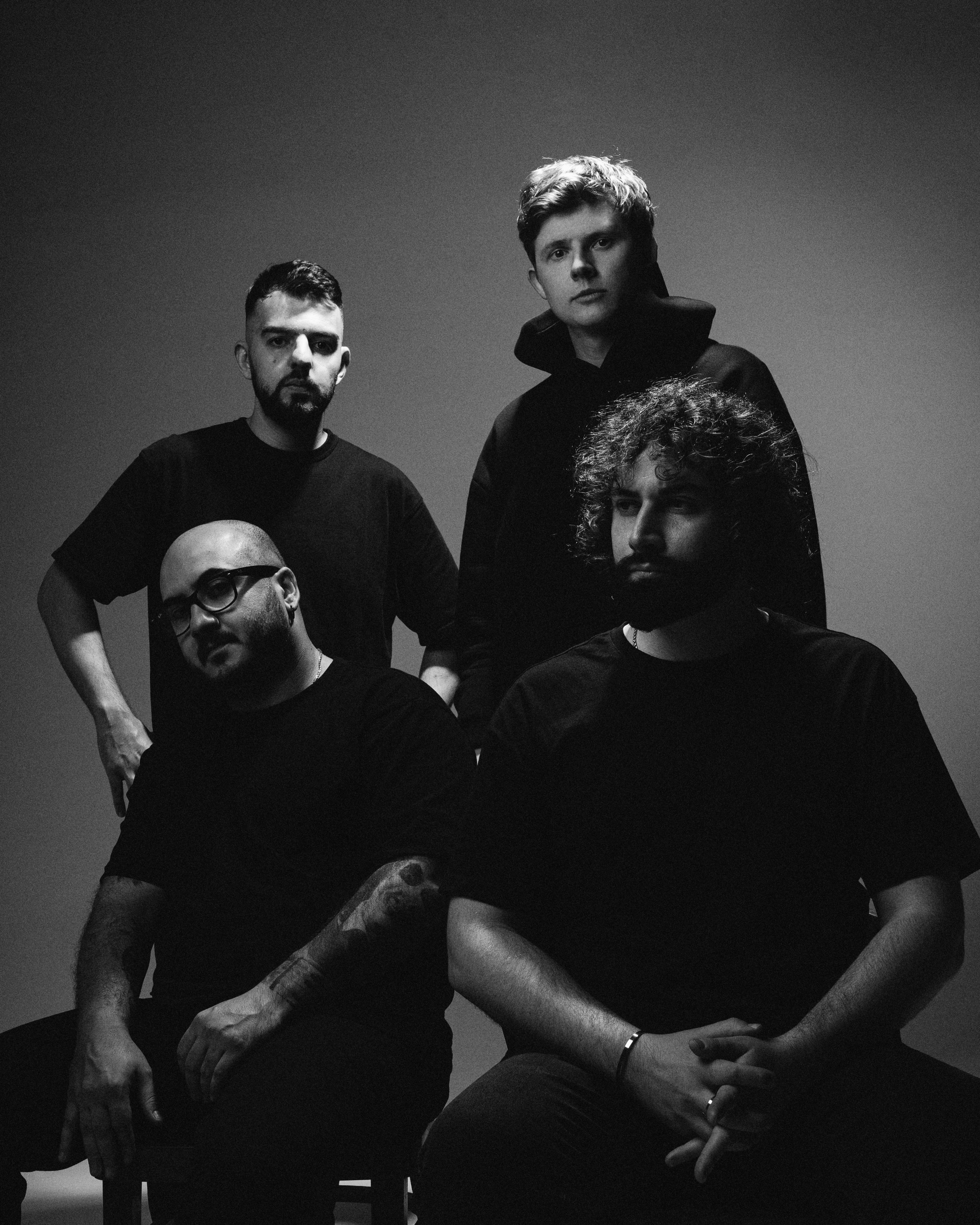
Artem Popov, Arman Babaian, Zakhariy Zurabian, Ivan Yakushin

The band's first solo concert took place in 2021. The following year, the EP "2084" was released, which attracted great interest from listeners in the UK, Germany, Poland, Finland, Denmark, Bulgaria, Austria, Spain, France, the USA, and Armenia.

In 2023, the band's single "Void Manifesto" from the mini-album "2084" peaked at number 4 on the Primordial Radio Top 40 chart.

In February 2023, the single "Misery" won the "Single/Video of the Month" category on Metal Has No Borders.

From 2021 to 2025, the band "Manapart" gave more than 30 concerts in Russia and Armenia.

== Members ==
- Artem Popov – vocals (2018 - present)
- Arman Babaian - (lead guitar) (2018 - present)
- Zakhariy Zurabian - (drums) (2018 - present)
- Ivan Yakushin - (bass guitar) (2021 - present)

== Reviews by critics ==
Irana Najafova about the style of the band Manapart:

"...the sharp but dramatic irony in the clinging vocals blends coolly with the sound of the music. Ethnic motifs give the arrangement depth and volume; it is a multitude of paths, each of which opens the song from a new side. The oriental tones fit perfectly with the light melancholy of the lyrics. The guitars are recorded stylishly and cleanly, emphasized by the drums. There is not a single superfluous sound in the musical canvas".

Anastasia Ignatova, "Rockcor" magazine:

"The band decided to revive not the most popular genre - nu-metal - but in their performance everything turns into real hits, and even the listener, who is very far from the presented genre, penetrates the team's creativity, thanks to their incredible expression and cosmic energy".

== Discography ==
=== Studio albums ===
- 2020 — "Manapart".
- 2024 — "Red".

=== Mini-albums ===
- 2022 — "2084"

=== Singles ===
- 2022 — "Tomorrow".
- 2022 — "Yerani".
- 2023 — "Misery" (in collaboration with the band Tardigrade Inferno)
- 2023 — "Roombaya".
- 2024 — "Bull’s Eye".
- 2024 — "Suspiria"
- 2025 — "Terrorize!"

== Videography ==
- 2021 — Vostok (Official Video 4k)
- 2021 — Reflection of Reality Official Video
- 2022 — Void Manifesto (Lyric Video)
- 2022 — Bullets (Lyric Video)
- 2022 — Indoctrination (Official Video)
- 2022 — Yerani (Official Video)
- 2022 — Tomorrow (Official Video by Kevork Mourad)
- 2023 — Misery (feat. Tardigrade Inferno) — Official Music Video
- 2023 — Roombaya (Official Lyric Video)
- 2024 — Bull’s Eye (Official Lyric Video)
- 2024 — Suspiria (Official Lyric Video)
- 2025 — Terrorize! (Official Lyric Video)
