= Twelvestep =

Swedish band

- Origin: Halmstad, Sweden
- Genres: Metalcore, nu metal
- Years active: 2004–2010
- Label: Pure Rock Records
- Members: Lennart Nilsson; Marco Kuru; Jonas Prahl; Jimmy Paulsson; Kristoffer Andersson; Fredrik Svensson
- Past members: Melker Bengtsson
- Website: Twelvestep.se

Twelvestep is a Swedish nu metal/metalcore band, formed in 2004 by members of other lesser known Swedish metal and punk rock bands. The band have released two EPs, been featured on one compilation album, and their debut album Worst Case Scenario, produced by well renowned heavy metal producer Rickard Bengtsson was released on February 21, 2008. The band is currently on hiatus as of January 9, 2010.

== History ==
=== The beginning ===
Twelvestep was originally formed as a side project in 2004. Members Marco Kuru, Lennart Nilsson, Jonas Prahl and Kristoffer Anderson (who did not join Twelvestep until later) were all in the band Spine, who played the demo stage at well known Swedish music festival Hultsfredsfestivalen. Finding that they liked Twelvestep more than any of the other projects they were working on, their longtime friend Jimmy Paulsson was asked to join in on bass, and the band was not a side project any more. The band's first drummer was Melker Bengtsson, who was replaced with Kristoffer Anderson for the recording of their first EP, called Roots of Anger. It was self-released in 2005 and distributed by the band. The EP drew the interest of NLP Records, who decided to release one of their tracks on the compilation album Revolver: Hard rock and Metal edition vol. 2

The first EP received great international reviews, which spurred the band to record a second one while starting to look for a label and management. The second EP was called No Tomorrow and featured four brand new tracks, and was also self-released and distributed by the band.

=== Signing with a label ===
Jimmy Paulsson found out that Sami Rusani (owner of Pure Rock Entertainment) lived in the same apartment building as himself, and decided to give him their two EPs and ask if he was interested in doing something with them. This resulted in the band being signed to sub-division Pure Rock Records and put in the studio with world-famous producer Rickard Bengtsson (Arch Enemy, Mortis, Opeth, Spiritual Beggars). The debut album Worst Case Scenario was released on February 21, 2008.

=== Touring and Bullet for my Valentine ===
Twelvestep quickly gained a buzz for their energetic live shows. After being invited to play at a club called The Rock in Copenhagen, Denmark, the band came up with the idea to bring their own fan buses instead of just inviting over fans to the neighboring country. On their first gig in Denmark, they brought a full sized bus with more than 50 fans, which impressed the clubowners to the point that they were immediately booked for another gig a couple of months later, where they repeated the process.

It was also at The Rock that they caught the attention of a band promoter from The Agency Group, who decided to put them on tour with UK-based Bullet for my Valentine, opening for them on all their Scandinavian gigs in December 2006.

=== Recent events ===
The band is currently on hiatus due to three original band members leaving the band, and internal disagreement amongst the band.

== Line-up ==
- Lennart Nilsson - vocals (2004-)
- Marco Kuru - guitar (2004-)
- Jonas Prahl - guitar, (2004-)
- Jimmy Paulsson - bass (2004-)
- Kristoffer Andersson - drums (2005-)
- Fredrik Svensson - Sampling/Keyboard (2005-)

=== Former members ===
- Melker Bengtsson - drums (2004–2005)

== Discography ==
Date of Release	Title	Label	US Billboard Peak	US sales
1 May 2005	Roots of Anger	Self-released	-	-
20 August 2006	No Tomorrow	Self-released	-	-
21 February 2008	Worst Case Scenario	Pure Rock Records	-	-

=== Videos ===
- Obstinate, Internet, 2006
