= Xombie (band) =

Hip hop / heavy metal band

- Origin: New York City, United States
- Genres: Hip hop; metal; hood metal
- Years active: 2010–present
- Members: Atom Crews (Vocals); Robert "Fish" Fishkin (Guitar); Roy Galvan (Guitar) "Cadillac" Michael Martabano(Bass); Eric Castillo (Drums)
- Website: www.xombie.nyc

Xombie is a hip hop / heavy metal band formed in New York City, New York in February 2010. The band plays a style of music they have deemed "Hood Metal" and currently consists of Atom Crews (lead vocals), Robert Fishkin (lead guitar), Roy Galvan (lead guitar), "Cadillac" Michael Martabano (bass), and Eric Castillo (drums). The band has 3 EPs under their belt, with the most recent, "Capital X" released on July 29, 2014.

Xombie began touring in September, 2012 and has supported major acts such as Dope, Hed PE, Otep, Butcher Babies, Bobaflex and Psychostick. They have also played at several major music festivals, including The Bamboozle and CMJ in 2012.

In 2013 Xombie debuted new music at the CBGB Festival, the largest music festival in New York City and were also seen alongside artists such as Wu-Tang Clan's Cappadonna, Shinobi Ninja, and Apathy (rapper). They began working on their new album after coming off their national tour when original drummer, Rob Patierno departed from the band and was replaced by Eric Castillo.

The band has since officially released their new album, "Capital X" and is being supported by its first single, "Rock Bottom" which stars world-famous backyard brawler and UFC fighter Kimbo Slice and Fuse (TV channel) host, Juliya Chernetsky in the music video directed by Oren Sarch (Pi (film), Requiem for a Dream).

== Discography ==
- Xombie [EP] (2010)
- Swaggaholix [EP] (2011)
- Swaggaholix Deluxe [LP] (2012)
- Capital X [EP] (2014)
- Super Cell (2017)
