= Scars of Life =

American nu metal band

- Origin: Pompano Beach, Florida
- Genre: Nu metal
- Years active: 2000–2006; 2011–2014; 2024–present
- Label: Rock Ridge
- Members: Anthony Parrinello; Jason Rodman; Joe Raio; Kyle Shapiro; Mike Kennedy
- Past members: Al Torres, Chris Mullen, Jay Capps

Scars of Life are an American nu metal band from Pompano Beach, Florida.

== History ==
Scars of Life were formed in Pompano Beach in 1999 originally as a heavy metal band called Confined. However, the original band members weren't happy with their style, so they underwent a complete change. Their debut album Mute was released in January 2002, followed by What We Reflect in 2005. Despite not being released on a major record label, Mute managed to pull in excellent playing numbers on streaming sites, often surpassing established nu-metal bands like Korn and Papa Roach. They gained traction partially through a deal made in 2002 allowing UFC to use their music.

In 2006, vocalist Kyle Shapiro left the band, and the remaining members split up shortly afterwards.

In 2011, the band announced their intention to reform with Kyle Shapiro, their former lead singer. They recorded a new album, which was released in 2013 under the title A Heart Still Beats. Despite album's positive reviews, the musicians announced the band's second breakup on their Facebook page in may 2014.

The band again returned in 2024, releasing the singles: “Falling Up”, “As Wounds Open"and “Lost in Your Arms" in July 2025.

== Members ==
- Anthony Parrinello – guitar, songwriting, lyrics (2000–2026)
- Kyle Shapiro - vocals, lyrics, songwriting (2000-2026)
- Jason Rodman – drums, songwriting, production (2000-2026)
- Jason Raio – guitar
- Mike Kennedy - bass

== Discography ==
=== Albums ===
- Mute (2001)
- What We Reflect (2005)
- A Heart Still Beats (2013)

=== EPs/Demos ===
- 2002 Demo (2002)
- Another Tomorrow (EP, 2003)

=== Singles ===
- "Dying Here" (2004)
- "Falling Up" (2024)
- "As Wounds Open" (2024)
- "Lost in Your Arms" (2025)
