= Mallavora =

English alternative metal band

- Origin: Bristol, England
- Genres: Alternative metal
- Years active: 2019–present
- Label: Church Road Records
- Members: Jessica Douek; Larry Sobieraj; Ellis James; Sam Brownlow
- Website: mallavora.co.uk

Mallavora is an English alternative metal band based in Bristol. Formed in 2019, the band is composed of lead vocalist Jessica Douek, guitarist Larry Sobieraj, bassist Ellis James, and drummer Sam Brownlow. Since their inception, they have released an album What If Better Never Comes? (2026), three EPs, Paradise (2020), Origins (2023), and Echoes (2024) and have performed at festivals including 2000trees and Download Festival. They have been noted for their advocacy of social causes, in particular disability access at concert venues.

== History ==
The band originated while the members were attending various universities in Birmingham. Drummer Jack Pedersen, bassist Ellis James, and guitarist Larry Sobieraj played together casually starting in 2017, but the band became a serious endeavor with the addition of vocalist Jessica Douek in August 2019. Their name came from the scientific name for the honey badger (Mellivora capensis), "a tough little animal unafraid to take on large predators". The following month, they performed at Worcester Music Festival.

Mallavora debuted with several singles in 2019 and early 2020, earning radio play on Planet Rock, TotalRock, and BBC Music Introducing. One of these, "Favourite Mistake", was given a virtual reality video. The band's touring plans for 2020 were disrupted due to the COVID-19 pandemic. Despite this, their debut EP, Paradise, was released in August 2020.

In early 2021, the band were featured on the Voices for the Unheard playlist, curated by the band Nova Twins alongside a compilation album of the same name meant to celebrate POC artists in alternative music. 2022 saw the band release two more singles, "Imposter" and a cover of Chris Isaak's "Wicked Game".

The band released another single, "Disorder", in February 2023, with a music video premiered by Soundsphere magazine the following month. The song gained virality on TikTok and saw play on BBC Radio 1's Future Alternative program. Their second EP, Origins, was released on May 12, 2023. The following summer, they performed at the 2000trees festival in Gloucestershire, headlined by American Football, Eagles of Death Metal, and Frank Carter and the Rattlesnakes, among others.

In February 2024, Mallavora won Kerrang! Radio's "The Deal" competition. Their prize included an Avalanche Stage spot at that year's Download Festival, alongside Billy Talent, Silverstein, and Noahfinnce; a signing to Marshall Records; and recording sessions for a new EP, with Skindred guitarist Mikey Demus producing. The following June, they released the single "Skin" from these sessions. That same month, Alternative Press included the band in a list of "rising artists to know this month".

== Musical style and influences ==
Mallavora are typically described as a heavy metal and alternative metal band. Their sound has been compared to Nothing More, Fire from the Gods, Nova Twins, and Wargasm. According to Sobieraj, the band originally played indie rock before adopting a heavier sound when Douek joined.

The group has cited a variety of influences, including Alter Bridge, Mastodon, My Chemical Romance, Rage Against the Machine. Douek takes vocal influence from older soul/rock and roll singers like Elvis Presley, Chuck Berry, and Sam Cooke, as well as more modern vocalists like Nothing More's Jonny Hawkins, Nova Twins' Amy Love, and Brass Against's Sophie Urista.

== Advocacy ==
Mallavora have advocated for a number of social causes, both in their music and in public statements. They have used social media, particularly Instagram, to address gender and racial disparity in rock and metal. Douek, who has fibromyalgia and sometimes requires mobility aids, has often spoken about the lack of accessibility at rock venues, and the band strives to play wheelchair-accessible venues whenever possible. Their song "Disorder" was written about Douek's experiences with ableism. Other songs have addressed topics of societal alienation ("Skin"), and transphobia ("Wake Up").

== Members ==
- Jessica Douek – lead vocals
- Larry Sobieraj – guitar
- Ellis James – bass, vocals
- Sam Brownlow – drums (joined 26th Feb 2025)

Former members

- Jack Pedersen – drums (left 8th Jan 2025)

== Discography ==
=== Studio albums ===
- What If Better Never Comes? (2026)

=== Extended plays ===
- Paradise (2020)
- Origins (2023)
- Echoes (2024)

=== Singles ===
- "Daylight" (2019)
- "Ego" (2020)
- "Deceiver" (2020)
- "Favourite Mistake" (2020)
- "Paradise" (2020)
- "Imposter" (2022)
- "Disorder" (2023)
- "Villain" (2023)
- "Wake Up" (2024)
- "Skin" (2024)
- "It's Not Enough" (2024)
- "Smile" (2025)
- "Waste" (2025)
- "Lilith & Esther" (2026)
- "Hopeless" (2026)
- "Host" (2026)

=== Music videos ===
Year	Title	Director
2020	"Ego"	Charlie McMorine
2020	"Deceiver"	Charlie McMorine
2020	"Paradise"	Alex McDonald
2022	"Wicked Game"	Adam Gorecki & Lizzie Kim
2022	"Imposter"	Caleb Hartley
2023	"Disorder"	Fish Outta Water
2023	"Villain"	Fish Outta Water
2024	"Skin"	Murray Deaves
2025	"Smile"	Murray Deaves
2025	"Waste"	Tom Damsell
2026	"Hopeless"	Murry Deaves
2026	"Host"	Murry Deaves
