= Defrage =

Estonian musical group

DefRage now Defrage Reload
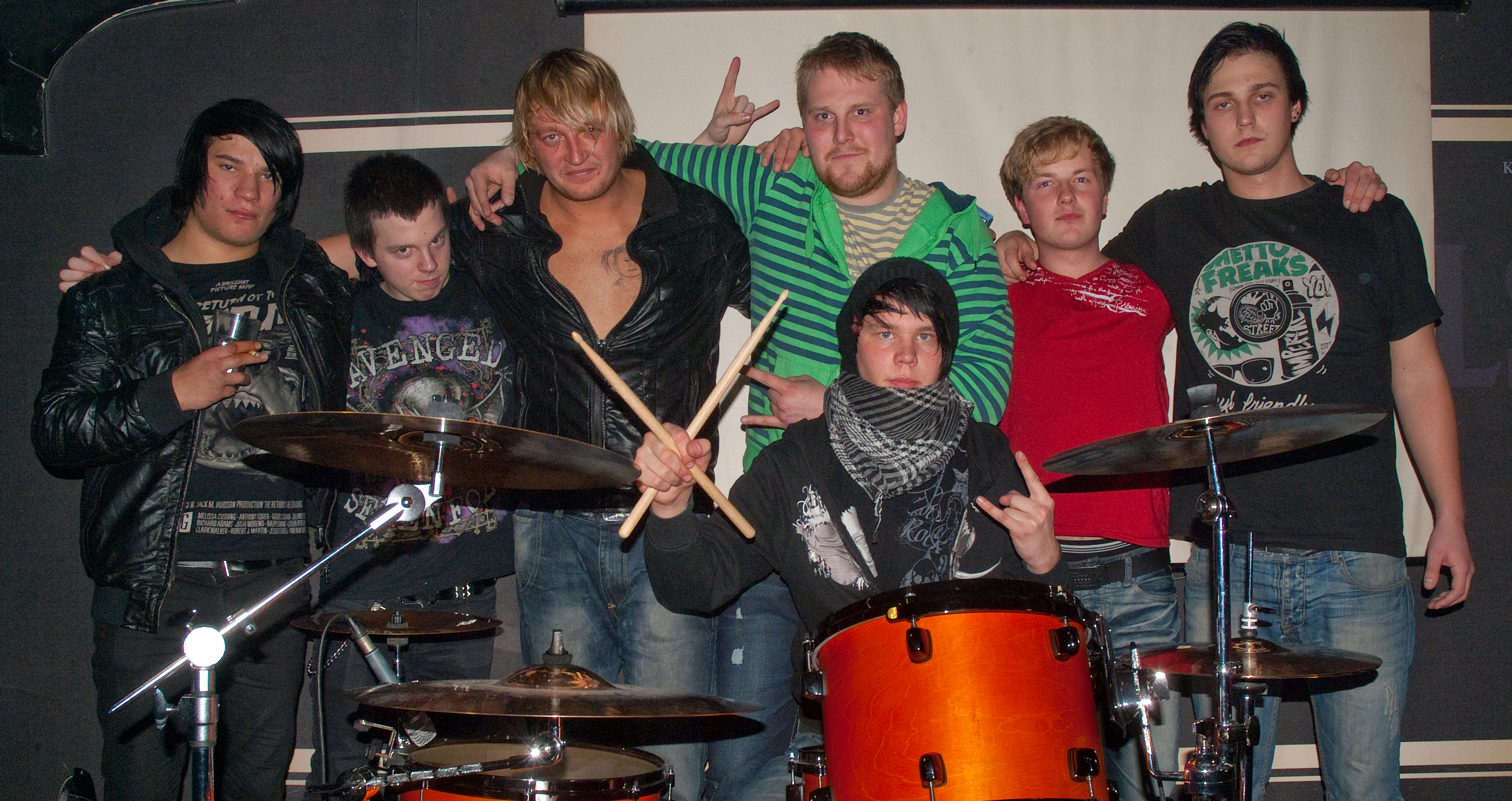
- Defrage at Plovdiv, Bulgaria in 2012 from left Andre Kaldas, Aleks Ohaka, Kari "Infinity" Kärner, Argo Ollep, Andres Arens, manager Alo Puusepp, Joonas Uus

Background information
- Origin: Pärnu, Pärnumaa, Estonia
- Genres: Hard rock, post-grunge, alternative metal
- Years active: 2007–2014/2023- present
- Label: Independent
- Past members: Kari "Infinity" Kärner; Andre Kaldas; Kevin Presmann; Argo Ollep; Joonas Uus; Andres Arens; Aleks Ohaka; Daniel Leppsoo; Kaspar Peterson; Artjom Jevstajev; Mikk Künnapas
- Website: defragereload.com

Defrage (since 2023: Defrage Reload) is an Estonian metal and rock band formed in 2007.

The band had done numerous gigs in Estonia and won the MTV Eesti Award for Best Music Video in 2009 for "Save Us From Religion". They were known for selling their album in parking lots and public places to raise money for their tours. However, there is no public record of public performances of the band since 2017.

== History ==
Defrage started to have their first band rehearsals in early 2007 when Kari (rhythm guitarist) got a response from Mikk (solo guitarist) to his advertisement on the website metal.ee "looking for band members for an American style rock band". Soon after that Daniel (in early years bass guitar) and Sten (drums) joined for rehearsals which mainly took place in an old garage that belonged to Mikk's father. In the beginning the band just played and practiced together without a singer whom Kari looked for at the same time.

The band filmed a video for "Hotel Breakers" and released their album Jackal in January 2012.

After one year of touring in Europe, Defrage released their second album "The Sick Letter" in May 2013. Defrage performed at one of Europe's biggest rock festivals called Nova Rock, which takes place every June in Austria.

Defrage disbanded sometime in 2014, before the creation of a new band called Illumenium, which includes former Defrage members Kari Kärner, Andre Kaldas and Kevin Presmann. The new band continues with some previous Defrage songs, including "The Sick Letter".

Since 2023 the band was again renamed from "California Condor" to "Defrage Reload"

== Former members ==
- Mikk Künnapas – solo guitar (2007-2008)
- Artjom Jevstajev – vocals (2009–2011)
- Kaspar Peterson – bass guitar (2009–2011)
- Daniel Leppsoo – solo guitar (2007–2011)
- Aleks Ohaka – solo guitar (2011–2014)
- Andres Arens – drums (2009–2014)
- Joonas Uus – bass (2011–2014)
- Argo Ollep – vocals (2007–2009, 2011–2014)
- Andre Kaldas – screaming vocals (2011–2014)
- Kari "Infinity" Kärner – rhythm guitar, vocals (2007–2014)
- Kevin Presmann – drums (2014)

== Discography ==
- Save Us From Religion (EP) (2008)
- Save U.S. From Religion (Special Edition) (CD) (2010)
- Jackal (Album) (CD) (2011)
- The Sick Letter (Album) (CD) (2013)

Defrage Reload

- Revelation One (Album) (CD) (2023)
- Pharmakon (Album) (CD) (2024)
