= Sub Dub Micromachine =

German industrial metal band

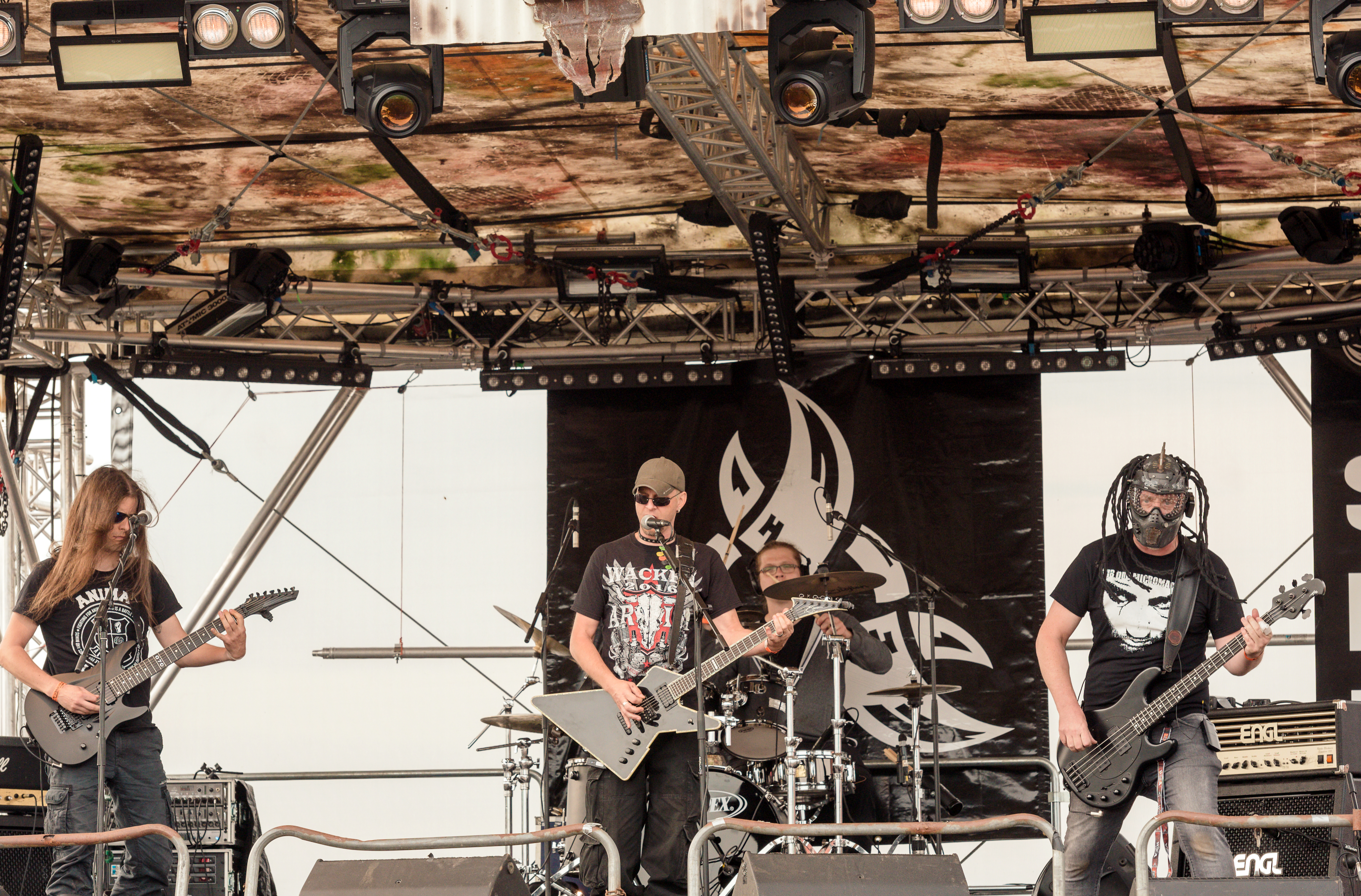
- Sub Dub Micromachine at Wacken Open Air 2017

Background information
- Also known as: SDMM
- Origin: Berlin, Germany
- Genres: Industrial metal
- Years active: 2000–present
- Members: H-Beta; Kirk de Burgh; Marcello Goldhofer

Sub Dub Micromachine (also abbreviated as SDMM) is a German metal band. They gained fame through heavy airplay on the internet radio station ChroniX Aggression. Their music has been heavily influenced by groups like Korn and Fear Factory and includes low-tuned guitars, slap bass, and mixing vocal styles, like singing, growling and rapping. They are largely an industrial metal band but have also been categorized as nu metal, alternative metal, and groove metal.

== Band members ==
- Kirk DeBurgh – guitar, vocals
- H-Beta – bass
- Marcello Goldhofer – drums

== Discography ==
=== 2002 Rabautz! ===
==== Track listing ====
1. Break The Rules
2. Bullshit
3. Eternal Fight
4. Jahrhundertstaender
5. Last Resort
6. Legoland Brennt
7. Looza
8. No Return
9. Recognize Yourself
10. Renegades
11. So Far
12. Wake Up
13. Xavy Metal

=== 2008 Auferstanden! ===
==== Track listing ====
1. Power's Cummin' Home
2. Don't bring Me Down
3. Road To Nowhere
4. Naked
5. Fly
6. Pump Up The Blast
7. No Time
8. Slave of My Mind
9. Bomb TV Down
10. Truth Is A Lie
11. Grobschlaechter
12. BONUS Road to Nowhere Video

=== 2016 Settle For Force ===
==== Track listing ====
1. How Deep Is Your Hate?
2. DOOMED
3. Shut The Fuck Up And Die
4. As Soon As You Were Dead
5. Morning Star
6. Unkind Exit
7. No Pain – No Gain
8. M:A:O:A
9. Settle For Force
10. Her Scorn Is Out of Breath
11. Burning Fears
12. S.D.M.M.
