= Psycho Synner =

American alternative metal band (2020–2023)

- Psycho Synner in the "We Hate You" music video (left to right): Astaroth, Jeremy Spencer, Volac and Crucifier

Background information
- Also known as: Psychosexual (2020–2021); The Light (2022)
- Origin: Las Vegas, Nevada, U.S.
- Genres: Alternative metal; industrial metal; hard rock; nu metal; gothic rock
- Years active: 2020–2023
- Label: 6ex Records
- Spinoffs: Semi-Rotted
- Past members: Jeremy Spencer; Crucifier; Astaroth; Volac
- Logo
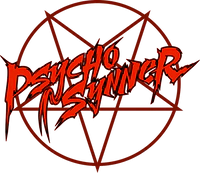

Psycho Synner was an American alternative metal band from Las Vegas, Nevada, formed in 2020, originally as Psychosexual. Starting as a solo project by Jeremy Spencer, former drummer of Five Finger Death Punch who left in 2018 after undergoing spinal surgery, the band evolved with additional members, as heavier metal elements were mixed with new wave influences. Spencer renamed the band to Psycho Synner in 2021 to better fit this musical direction.

The band's final line-up consisted of lead vocalist Jeremy Spencer (also known as Devil Daddy and later Grym Synner), guitarist Crucifier, bassist Astaroth and drummer Volac. Jason Hook, former guitarist of Five Finger Death Punch, made a guest appearance on the band's EP Songs to Stalk You By, playing on two covers, "Watchin' You" by Kiss and "Gonna Get Close to You" by Queensrÿche. The band was infamous for their edgy lyrics and music videos, use of softcore pornography and releasing nine albums in one day. While self-described by Spencer as hard rock and heavy metal, the band has spanned many genres, such as alternative metal, gothic metal, gothic rock, industrial metal and nu metal.

In 2020 they released one studio album, Torch the Faith, and one extended play, Songs to Stalk You By, as Psychosexual. After a poor reception, the band removed them on streaming. In 2021 the band got a fresh start as Psycho Synner and released nine albums in one day: 666 B.C., Vol. 1: The Burning Years, 666 A.D., Vol. 2: The Scorched Years, As the Demon Dances Under the Blood Red Sky, Bite the Snake, Dying to See You, Fuck in the Fire, Killing You Softly, The Devil Made You Do It and Unholy Hymns for the Children. In 2022 they released Demondelic and Eat the Flame, all of which were poorly received, so Spencer ended the project in 2023 to focus on his death metal band, Semi-Rotted.

== History ==
=== Spencer's departure from Five Finger Death Punch and formation (2018–2020) ===
Jeremy Spencer was a founding member of heavy metal band Five Finger Death Punch, and played on all of their releases up until And Justice for None (2018). For a Fall 2018 tour with Breaking Benjamin, Charlie Engen replaced Spencer to allow him to undergo back surgery. On December 18, it was announced that Spencer had departed the band permanently. In a 2020 interview with Rock Feed, he revealed he will not be rejoining the band: "I don't think my body is gonna be in good enough shape to go back and do headlining shows or anything."

Spencer was already a solo artist when he left Five Finger Death Punch, who released four albums as Devil Daddy. While having the same aesthetic as Psycho Synner, the music was more influenced by 1980s pop and new wave. He was also acting, co-directing, writing and providing the music for the soft pornographic horror parody series Lady Killer TV. This, and wanting to make "darker, heavier, more aggressive" music, encouraged him to form Psychosexual, influenced by Kiss, Ghost, David Bowie, Type O Negative and gothic rock in general.

=== Torch the Faith and Songs to Stalk You By (2020) ===
Cover art of the single for "Baby on Fire"

Psychosexual, with a line-up of Devil Daddy on lead vocals, Crucifier on guitar, Astaroth on bass and Volac on drums, released their debut studio album, Torch the Faith, on July 31, 2020, through Spencer's own independent label, 6ex Records. Co-produced by him with Drowning Pool producer Shawn McGhee, three singles were released from the album: "Let the Sin Begin", "Lady Killer" and "Baby on Fire", all of which had music videos that amounted over 340,000 views on YouTube. The band played its first concert the same day as part of a Kilpop-presented event that was livestreamed via the group's Facebook page and YouTube channel. A music video was also released for the title track on August 8.

On November 27, 2020, the band released its first and only extended play, Songs to Stalk You By, which consists of six covers: "Watchin' You" by Kiss, "Sex Type Thing" by Stone Temple Pilots, "Gonna Get Close to You" by Queensrÿche, "Love You to Death" by Type O Negative, "Love You till Tuesday" by David Bowie and "Every Breath You Take" by the Police. Spencer said the EP is "a fun little compilation of bands I love. There is definitely a tongue-in-cheek creepiness to the themes that tie the songs together, and that's what made them so much fun to record". He also reunited with Jason Hook, also formerly of Five Finger Death Punch, who plays guitar on "Watchin' You" and "Gonna Get Close to You".

=== Name change and "Devil from Hell" (2021) ===
The first two releases by Psychosexual only saw minor success and were poorly received. This encouraged Spencer to reboot the band. "When you make records, they're like snapshots in time", Spencer told Drag the Waters: The Pantera Podcast. "We made the first thing pretty fast, and I just threw it out independently." He subsequently took the heavily criticized debut album Torch the Faith off streaming in early 2021. He continues, "Nobody even really knows much about the other music, which I do like, but I think this is more appropriate of where we kind of wanna debut; this is what I wanted to be the first thing."

Following this, the band changed its name to Psycho Synner. Spencer has also changed the name of his Devil Daddy character to Grym Synner. "I chose [the name Psychosexual] because the song's lyrics were primarily sex-oriented", he explained. "So, when I formed a new rock band, I kept that name. However, once the new music became guitar-centric, it took on a more sinister style – less about sex and partying." The band's first release as Psycho Synner was "Devil from Hell" in March 2021, which Spencer really liked and wished it had been their first release.

=== Nine albums in one day (2021) ===
Satanism is a common theme in Psycho Synner's music

Psycho Synner released their unofficial debut album, Unholy Hymns for the Children, on November 5, 2021. They released eight more albums the same day, all with different sounds: Bite the Snake is electronic rock, while As the Demon Dances Under the Blood Red Sky is more psychedelic. Fuck the Fire is "the straight-ahead face-smasher", Killing You Softly is acoustic music, while 666 B.C. Volume 1: The Burning Years and 666 A.D. Volume 2: The Scorched Years are the first and second parts of a double album, respectively. This was rounded out by Dying to See You, a straight-up metal album, where The Devil Made You Do It is rock and roll with Satanic themes.

All nine Psycho Synner albums were available on CD and vinyl. In regards to how the band wrote so many albums in such a short amount of time, Spencer said, "We couldn't play shows because of the pandemic, so we locked ourselves up and wrote and recorded nonstop." He added, "Nine albums later, we have really found our groove, so to speak." The single "Lady Killer" was the second most added song of the first week of April at radio. An early 2022 Psycho Synner Tour soon followed, with Spencer exclaiming, "We can't wait to bring a visually exciting show for those who've been cooped up and are ready to rock."

=== Demondelic, Eat the Flame and demise (2022–2023) ===
For April Fools' Day, Psycho Synner "embraced Christianity" by renaming to The Light and releasing the single "I Surrender All". They returned with two more albums, Demondelic and Eat the Flame, both released on September 16, 2022. The former is seen as continuing the "hints of cheap industrial metal, sometimes smacking of Rob Zombie, sometimes Manson or Deathstars" of their previous albums. Reviews were similarly poor to the band's previous albums, but to make matters worse, the records were overshadowed by a new project by Spencer, the death metal band Semi-Rotted, who debuted in August with the EP Deader Than Dead and later released a music video for their song "Hammer Teeth". As a result, Psycho Synner's new albums saw less coverage, even with music videos.

Jeremy Spencer made the decision on July 17, 2023 to break-up Psycho Synner. Over its three years, the band had several relaunches, past albums were removed from streaming and critical reception was mostly poor. While having seven No. 1 songs on rock radio, the band never had a commercial breakthrough. When interviewed by Blabbermouth.net, Spencer confirmed that Semi-Rotted was his main focus. He concluded his time in Psychosexual and Psycho Synner "was quite an experience", but they released "some cheesy and boneheaded songs early" that he never recovered from. All Psycho Synner albums were pulled from streaming, and their YouTube channel was deleted.

== Critical reception ==
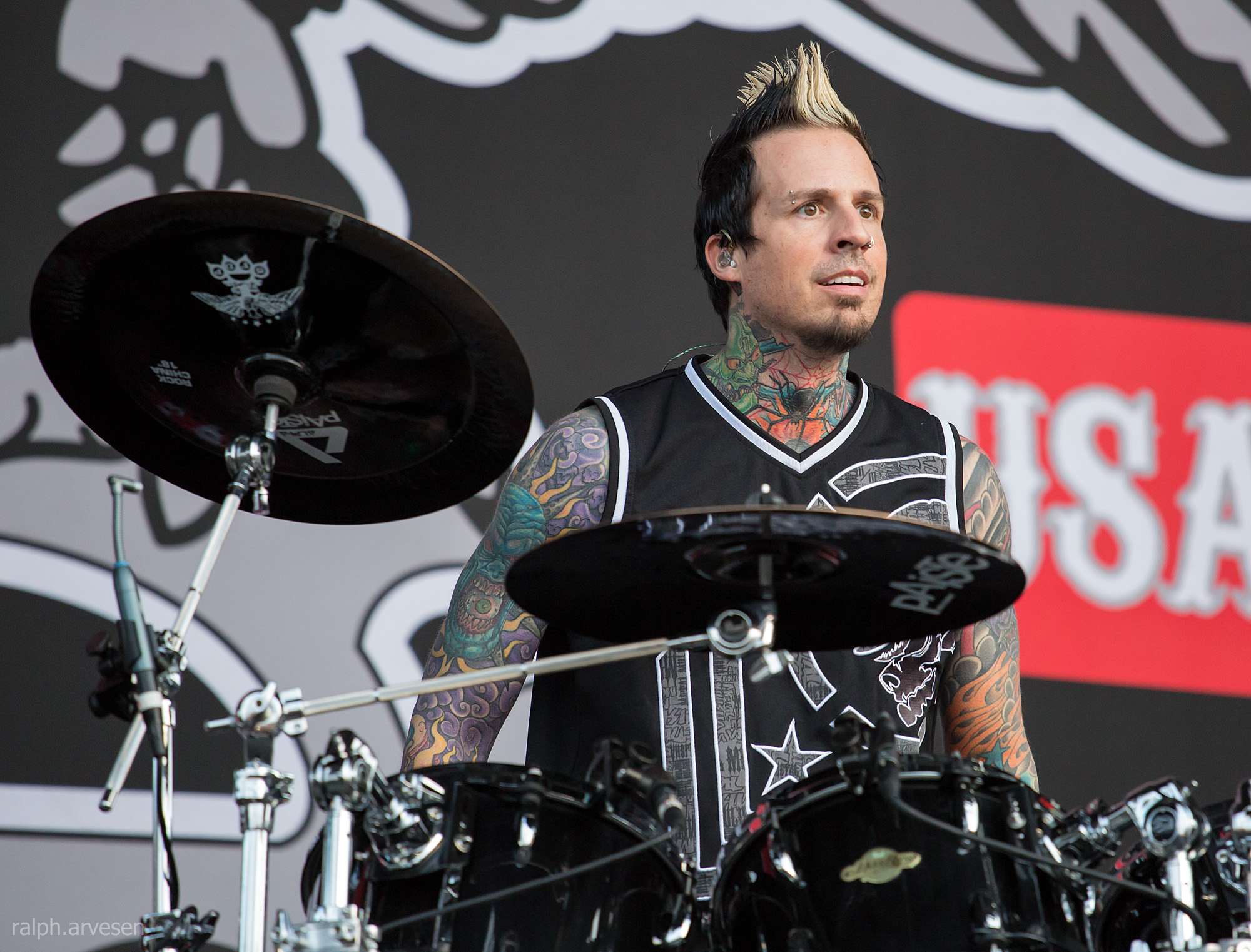
Jeremy Spencer faced criticism in most of his projects

Psycho Synner had poor critical reception during its three years of existence. Early reviews were skeptical; Axl Rosenberg of MetalSucks thought the debut single "Let the Sin Begin" was "marginally better" than Spencer's previous work. "The track sounds kinda like a dumbed-down version of 'I'm Afraid of Americans', which I find slightly less grating than the dumbed-down '90s arena rock in which Five Finger Death Punch traffic. Slightly", he concluded.

Diazable, in a review of Torch the Faith, said: "If you're looking to completely destroy any shred of musical hope you might have left, Psychosynner's debut album will certainly do the job", adding it was hard to find anything redeeming, from the "cringeworthy lyrics", to the "bizarre vocal choices" and "subpar instrumentation". They concluded the album was "an awkward, cringy mess that never quite finds its footing and is best left forgotten", and awarded it a 3/10. Bring the Noise gave a similarly poor review of Demondelic, who stated "the cover is awful", "the lyrics are still abysmally bad" and "Spencer still sings badly", giving the album one out of five stars.

Spencer was used to criticism in Five Finger Death Punch and his solo albums as Devil Daddy, which he took off streaming when he formed Psychosexual, but still got overwhelmed by the poor reception of his band. He responded by taking the two records off streaming, and made a separate profile for Psycho Synner on social media. "When you make records, they're like snapshots in time. We made the first thing pretty fast, and I just threw it out independently", he recalled. This did little to improve the band's reputation, and he, again, pulled it from streaming. "People said, 'This sucks.' I said, 'Hold on! It's going to be different.'" He continued, "We worked our asses off. People fucking hated it. I was an easy target."

== Band members ==
Final lineup

- Jeremy Spencer – vocals (2020–2023)
- Crucifier – guitar (2020–2023)
- Astaroth – bass (2020–2023)
- Volac – drums (2020–2023)

Guest appearances

- Kenny Hickey – guitar (2020; "I Wanna Be the Blood in Your Cut (Alternate Mix)")
- Jason Hook – guitar (2020; "Watchin' You" and "Gonna Get Close to You")
- Dave Wyndorf – vocals (2022; "Demondelic")

== Discography ==
Studio albums

- Torch the Faith (2020)
- 666 B.C., Vol. 1: The Burning Years (2021)
- 666 A.D., Vol. 2: The Scorched Years (2021)
- As the Demon Dances Under the Blood Red Sky (2021)
- Bite the Snake (2021)
- Dying to See You (2021)
- Fuck in the Fire (2021)
- Killing You Softly (2021)
- The Devil Made You Do It (2021)
- Unholy Hymns for the Children (2021)
- Demondelic (2022)
- Eat the Flame (2022)

Extended plays

- Songs to Stalk You By (2020)

Singles

- "Let the Sin Begin" (2020)
- "Lady Killer" (2020)
- "Baby on Fire" (2020)
- "I Wanna Be the Blood in Your Cut (Japanese Anime Video Version)" (2020)
- "Devil from Hell" (2021)
- "Unholy" (2021)
- "On Your Grave" (2021)
- "Love on the Grave" (2021)
- "Rebels of the Underground" (2021)
- "I Surrender All" (2022)
- "Lady Killer" (2022)
