= Simon Says (band) =

American rock band

- Origin: Sacramento, California, U.S.
- Genres: Alternative metal; nu metal; alternative rock; post-grunge; post-hardcore
- Years active: 1992–2004; 2023–present
- Label: Hollywood Records
- Spinoffs: Key to Arson

Simon Says is an American rock band from Sacramento, California. The band's lineup consists of lead vocalist Matt Franks, guitarist Zac Diebels, bassist Mike Arrieta, and drummer Chris Robyn.

In 2001, the band changed their name to Key to Arson, and they broke up in 2004. In 2023, Simon Says reunited, added their albums to streaming music platforms, and promised new music would be coming in the future.

== History ==
Simon Says was formed by a group of California high schoolers (Matt Franks, Zac Diebels, and Mike Johnston) who got their start playing high school auditoriums around the state in the early 1990s. Adding bassist Mike Arrieta in 1995, the group self-released two records, which attracted the attention of manager Jeff Saltzman. Saltzman set them up with noted mixer/producer Mark Needham and got them signed to Hollywood Records in July 1998. In 1999, they released their major-label debut, Jump Start, which yielded two hit modern rock singles, and the follow-up Shut Your Breath netted a third radio hit, "Blister". The group appeared on the ESPN X Games Experience tour in 1999.

In 2001, Simon Says left Hollywood Records over promotional issues and changed their name to Key to Arson; soon after, drummer Mike Johnston left the band, to be replaced by Dave "Stixx" Marich. In 2004, Key to Arson announced the completion of an album entitled Light 'Em Up, but by the end of the year the band had broken up. It is now known that Zac Diebels and Matt Franks have formed Automatic Static and will release a full album soon as of 2012, called Number IV.

Simon Says reunited in 2023, promising a 3-track EP in early 2024 and a full-length due out in May 2024.

== Band members ==
Current members

- Matt Franks – vocals (1992–2004, 2023–present)
- Zac Diebels – guitar (1992–2004, 2023–present)
- Mike Arrieta – bass (1995–2004, 2023–present)
- Chris Robyn – drums (2024–Present)

Former members

- Mike Johnston – drums (1992–2001, 2023–2024)
- Dave "Stixx" Marich – drums (2001–2004)
- Shane Ozmun – bass (1994–1995)

== Discography ==
=== Extended plays ===
- Touch Yer Toes (self-released, 1994) [demo EP]
- Retrograde (self-released, 2025)

=== Albums ===
- Little Boy (self-released, 1996)
- Perfect Example (self-released, 1997)
- Jump Start (Hollywood Records, 1999)
- Shut Your Breath (Hollywood, 2001)
- Light Em Up [as Key To Arson, 2004]

=== Singles ===
- "Life Jacket" (1999) US Billboard Mainstream Rock Tracks No. 23
- "Slider" (1999) Mainstream Rock No. 34
- "Sever" (1999)
- "Blister (Nothing)" (2001) Mainstream Rock No. 31
