= Lao pop =

Music genre of Laos

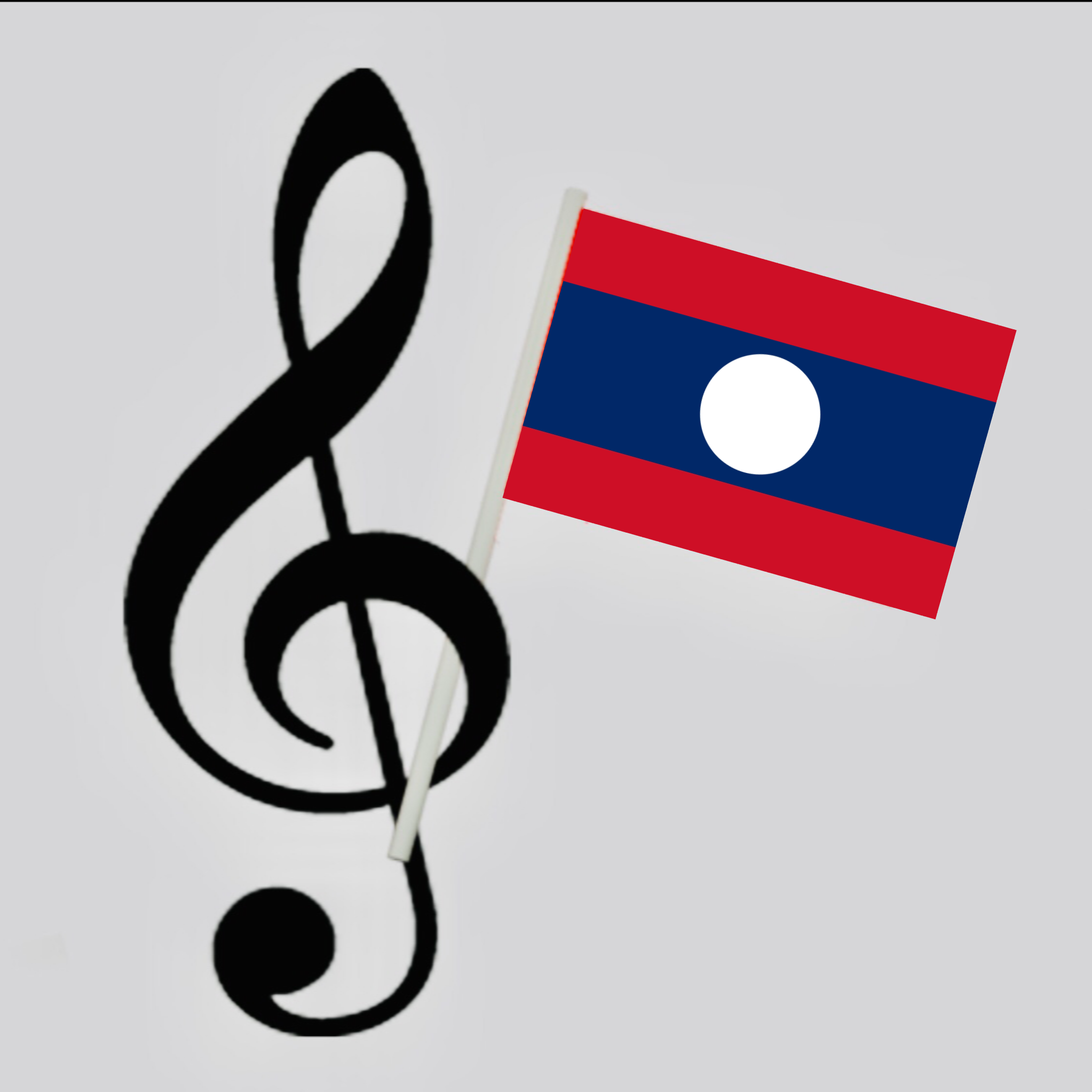
- Laotian music icon
- Other names: L-pop
- Stylistic origins: Pop, hip hop, electronic, R&B
- Cultural origins: 1990s, Laos
- Typical instruments: Vocals; keyboards; piano; sampler; sequencer; synthesizer; drum pad; drums; electric bass

Lao pop or L-pop is a music genre of pop music of Lao people.

== History ==
Lao pop music started forming itself in the late 1980s, when Laos started benefiting from an economic growth that has lasted till nowadays. Before the reforms implemented by the government, the entertainment industry was completely limited due to the tight censorship and the widespread poverty, which prevented the music scene from flourishing. From the 1970s to the late 1980s, the strictly patriotic songs, sponsored by the communist government, and the traditional Mor Lam genre were the only genres available to listen.

At the start of the 1990s, the Lao music scene started transformating. The first private music labels started emerging in Vientiane, the capital city, and some live music pubs appeared. However, these labels, at first, were financially weak and had a very limited capacity to promote their artists. Although at first the traditional Lao music, was still the most popular genre, the foreign influence of Korean K-Pop music, Japanese J-Pop music, and the pop music made in the neighbouring Thailand started being felt, not only in the fashion trends, but also in the local musical scene. From the start of the 2000s, Lao pop saw a dramatic increase of popularity due to the growing strength of the mainly Vientiane based music labels such as Lao-Pride Records, KPY Entertainment, Indee Records and Muanson Media. Lao pop gained local and international spotlight through Alexandra Bounxouei, who is considered to be the first Lao pop princess. Other Lao artists popular with the younger generation include Cells, L.O.G, Overdance, Princess, Caramel, Pull-T Club, Super One, Genii, Xtreme, Dozo, Tik Keoprasert, MAY, Annita, and Aluna.

From the mid-2000s, Lao Pop started benefiting itself from the growing number of musical events held in the country. For example, in 2008, was held from first time, the first edition of the Lao Music Awards, which was broadcast live by the Lao National Television. In this event, the most outstanding Lao Pop, rock and Mor Lam singers are awarded in its different categories. Since then on, this gala has been held almost annually in the National Cultural Hall of Vientiane. Apart from this event, other kinds of shows also encouraged the growth of the local music scene.

Lao pop today embraces a wide variety of styles that are mainly based in Vientiane, the capital of Laos. There are also a number of Lao artists from Luang Prabang, Laos.

== Popularity ==
Lao pop is popular in Laos and has recently penetrated neighboring markets. There is also a growing fan base in the United States, France, Thailand and Canada.

== See also ==
- Lao music
