= Greatest Hits: The Atlantic Years =

Greatest hits album by P.O.D.
- Released: November 21, 2006
- Recorded: 1999–2006
- Genres: Alternative metal; nu metal; rap metal; Christian metal
- Length: 62:58
- Labels: Atlantic; Rhino
- Producer: John Rubeli

P.O.D. chronology
Testify (2006)	Greatest Hits: The Atlantic Years (2006)	When Angels & Serpents Dance (2008)

Singles from Greatest Hits: The Atlantic Years
- 1. "Going in Blind" Released: September 15, 2006

Greatest Hits: The Atlantic Years is a greatest hits album by American Christian metal band P.O.D. It was the first P.O.D. release after the group left Atlantic Records in August 2006. Released on November 21, 2006, it sold 10,000 copies in its first week. A special edition of the album, which included The Warriors EP on a second CD, was released at Best Buy stores.

== Overview ==
Greatest Hits: The Atlantic Years was produced by John Rubeli. It contains seventeen songs, which include remastered recordings^{1} of material from the band's studio albums The Fundamental Elements of Southtown (1999), Satellite (2001), Payable on Death (2003), and Testify (2006), the extended play The Warriors EP, Volume 2 (2005), as well as "Sleeping Awake" from The Matrix Reloaded soundtrack and "Truly Amazing" from an album of material inspired by the 2004 movie The Passion of the Christ. Two previously unreleased songs, "Going in Blind" (recorded for the compilation) and "Here We Go" (a Testify B-side), are exclusive to Greatest Hits: The Atlantic Years, with the former being released as a single in September 2006 and receiving a music video to promote the compilation.

Vocalist Sonny Sandoval said the following about the compilation album and Atlantic Records during an interview in May 2012:

I don't think they ever expected us to sell ten million records. So, they made their money and they were like 'why push these guys anymore?' I think we kind of sensed that. We owed them a Greatest Hits and they still sucked us dry one last time. They got a Greatest Hits out of us.

== Reception ==
Professional ratings
Review scores
Source	Rating
AllMusic	4/5 stars
Christianity Today	4/5 stars
Cross Rhythms	9/10 squares
Jesus Freak Hideout	4/5 stars

Greatest Hits: The Atlantic Years received positive reviews from critics. Matt Collar of AllMusic referred to it as "easily the most listener-friendly album in their catalog." Mike Rimmer of Cross Rhythms gave the album a nine out of ten score, calling it "a collection of songs that celebrates P.O.D.'s glory days". Andree Farias of Christianity Today called the selection of songs on the compilation "a well-rounded set, not exhaustively conclusive, but appropriate nonetheless." John DiBiase of Jesus Freak Hideout gave the album four out of five stars, saying, "While hits records can be a real smash or a painful miss, Greatest Hits: The Atlantic Years is among one of the better greatest hits collections a band can receive."

== Track listing ==
No.	Title	Song from album (year)	Length
1.	"Southtown"	The Fundamental Elements of Southtown (1999)	4:08
2.	"Boom"	Satellite (2001)	3:07
3.	"Going in Blind"	Previously unreleased	4:27
4.	"Roots in Stereo"	Testify (2006)	4:42
5.	"Alive"	Satellite (2001)	3:23
6.	"Youth of the Nation"	Satellite (2001)	4:17
7.	"Sleeping Awake"	The Matrix Reloaded: The Album (2003)	3:24
8.	"Rock the Party (Off the Hook)"	The Fundamental Elements of Southtown (1999)	3:27
9.	"Lights Out"	Testify (2006)	2:46
10.	"Goodbye for Now"	Testify (2006)	4:33
11.	"Execute the Sounds"	Payable on Death (2003)	3:00
12.	"Will You"	Payable on Death (2003)	3:47
13.	"Truly Amazing"	The Passion of the Christ: Songs (2004)	3:02
14.	"Satellite"	Satellite (2001)	3:32
15.	"Set Your Eyes to Zion"	The Fundamental Elements of Southtown (1999)	4:07
16.	"Here We Go"	Previously unreleased	3:28
17.	"If It Wasn't for You"	The Warriors EP, Volume 2 (2005)	3:38
Total length:			62:58

- Tracks 1, 8, and 15 are from The Fundamental Elements of Southtown (1999)
- Tracks 2, 5, 6, and 14 are from Satellite (2001)
- Tracks 11 and 12 are from Payable on Death (2003)
- Track 17 is from The Warriors EP, Volume 2 (2005)
- Tracks 4, 9, and 10 are from Testify (2006)

The Warriors EP bonus CD
No.	Title	Original release (year)	Length
1.	"Intro"	The Warriors EP (1998)	1:38
2.	"Southtown"	The Warriors EP (1998)	4:29
3.	"Breathe Babylon" (1998 re-recorded version)	Brown (1996)	6:02
4.	"Rosa Linda"	The Warriors EP (1998)	1:42
5.	"Draw the Line" (1998 re-recorded version)	Snuff the Punk (1994)	3:13
6.	"Full Color" (1998 re-recorded version)	Brown (1996)	5:53
7.	"Sabbath" (instrumental)	The Warriors EP (1998)	4:33
Total length:			27:33

== Chart positions ==
=== Album ===
Chart	Peak position	Year
Billboard Top Christian Albums	8	2006
New Zealand Album Chart	5	2006

=== Songs ===
Song	Chart	Peak position	Year
"Going in Blind"	Billboard Mainstream Rock Tracks	35	2006

== Personnel ==
Album credits adapted from liner notes.

P.O.D.

- Sonny Sandoval – lead vocals
- Marcos Curiel – guitars (tracks 1–2, 4–6, 8, 14–15)
- Jason Truby – guitars (tracks 3–4, 7, 9–13, 16–17), vocals (tracks 3–4, 7, 9–13, 16–17)
- Traa Daniels – vocals (tracks 3–4, 7, 9–13, 16–17), bass guitar
- Wuv Bernardo – vocals (tracks 3–4, 7, 9–13, 16–17), drums

Production

- John Rubeli – compilation producer
- Howard Benson – producer (track 1, 2, 5–8, 11–15, uncredited)
- P.O.D. – producer (track 4, 9–13, 17, uncredited)
- Travis Wyrick – producer (track 17, uncredited)
- Glen Ballard – producer (track 4, 9–10, uncredited)
- Kenny Nemes – product manager
- Andrea Craig, Robin Hurley, Maria McKenna, Steve Woolard – project assistance
- Dorothy Stefanski – editorial supervision
- Masaki Koike – art direction
- Rachael Bickerton – business affairs
- Louie Teran – master compiler for Marcussen Mastering (Hollywood, California)

== Notes ==
^{1.} Various digital releases of Greatest Hits: The Atlantic Years list fourteen of the songs, excluding "Truly Amazing" and the two compilation exclusives, as being "2006 Remaster" versions.
