= Robert Green Brooks =

Bobby Brooks
- Born: Robert Green Brooks; August 19, 1957 (age 69); Minneapolis, Minnesota, U.S.
- Genres: R&B, funk, hip-hop, heavy metal, rock, pop
- Occupations: Record producer, audio engineer
- Years active: 1977–present
- Labels: Universal/Interscope, Atlantic, Warner Bros., Epic, Arista, Motown, MCA

Robert Green "Bobby" Brooks (born August 19, 1957) is an American record producer and audio engineer. He is known for his signature R&B sound as well as shaping 1980s and 1990s hits from artists such as DeBarge, The Temptations, Teena Marie, Whitney Houston, and Michael Jackson.

== Discography ==
=== 1970s ===
- 1979: Sally Moore, Sally Moore—Mixing

=== 1980s ===
- 1982: All This Love, DeBarge—Engineer
- 1982: Reunion, The Temptations—Engineer
- 1982: You've Got the Power, Third World—Engineer
- 1984: Starchild, Teena Marie—Engineer, Mixing
- 1986: Watch Out, Patrice Rushen—Engineer
- 1987: Naked to the World, Teena Marie—Engineer, Mixing
- 1988: Say It Again, Jermaine Stewart—Engineer
- 1988: Pebbles, Pebbles—Engineer
- 1988: Shieldstone, Shieldstone—Engineer, Mixing
- 1988: Tracie Spencer, Tracie Spencer—Mixing, Engineer
- 1989: Come Play with Me, Grady Harrell—Producer, Engineer, Mixing
- 1989: Larger than Life, Jody Watley—Engineer

=== 1990s ===
- 1990: I'm Your Baby Tonight, Whitney Houston—Engineer, Mixing
- 1990: Ivory, Teena Marie—Engineer, Mixing
- 1991: Affairs of the Heart, Jody Watley—Engineer
- 1991: Bandits, Carl King—Engineer
- 1991: Milestone, The Temptations—Engineer, Mixing
- 1991: Mo' Ritmo, Gerardo—Engineer, Mixing
- 1991: Red Hot + Blue: A Tribute to Cole Porter, Various Artists—Engineer
- 1991: Romance Me, Grady Harrell—Mixing
- 1992: All for Love, Timmy T—Engineer
- 1992: Do I Ever Cross Your Mind?, George Howard—Engineer, Mixing
- 1992: Love and Understanding, George Howard—Engineer, Mixing, Saxophone
- 1992: Love Dancin, Rodney Franklin—Engineer, Mixing,
- 1992: M M E Program 1, Force One Network—Engineer, Mixing
- 1992: Make Us One, Jackson Family—Engineer
- 1992: Something Real, Stephanie Mills—Engineer
- 1992: White Men Can't Jump, Original soundtrack—Recorder, Engineer
- 1993: Intimacy, Jody Watley—Engineer, Mixing
- 1993: Love Zone, Mahogany Blue—Mixing
- 1993: Show Me Your Heart, Andrew Logan—Mixing
- 1993: When Summer Comes, George Howard—Engineer, Mixing
- 1994: Born Dead, Body Count—Engineer
- 1994: Continuum (Nine Winds), Continuum—Engineer, Mixing
- 1994: Motown Comes Home, Various Artists—Engineer, Mixing
- 1994: Sonic the Hedgehog 3, Brad Buxer, Cirocco Jones—Composer
- 1994: Turn Yourself Around, A-1 Swift—Engineer, Mixing, Mixing Engineer
- 1995: Attitude Adjustment, George Howard—Mixing
- 1995: Forbidden, Black Sabbath—Recorder, Engineer, Mixing
- 1995: HIStory: Past, Present and Future, Book I, Michael Jackson—Percussion, Drums, Programming
- 1995: In the House, The 5th Dimension—Engineer, Mixing
- 1996: Best of Tyrone Davis: In the Mood, Tyrone Davis—Engineer
- 1996: Hillside, Hillside—Voices, Engineer
- 1996: Kenny Lattimore, Kenny Lattimore—Engineer
- 1996: Life (A New Musical), Original Cast—Engineer
- 1996: O, Glory: The Apostolic Studio Sessions, Rev. Gary Davis—Vocals, Choir, Chorus, Engineer
- 1996: Slang, Def Leppard—Programming, Production
- 1997: 4 Tha Hard Way, Rappin' 4-Tay—Engineer
- 1997: Best New Age, Vol. 6, Various Artists—Performer
- 1997: Betta Listen, Laurneá—Engineer
- 1997: Blood on the Dance Floor: HIStory in the Mix, Michael Jackson—Synthesizer, Percussion, Drums, Programming, Engineer
- 1997: Lovergirl: The Teena Marie Story, Teena Marie—Engineer Mixing
- 1997: Momentum, Jennifer Batten—Producer, Engineer
- 1997: Money Talks, Original soundtrack—Engineer
- 1997: Soul Control, Gerald Veasley—Engineer
- 1997: Soul Network Program II, Force One Network—Engineer, Mixing
- 1997: Urban Rapsody, Rick James—Engineer, Mixing
- 1997: Cellophane, Cellophane—Engineer
- 1997: Violent Demise: The Last Days, Body Count—Engineer, Mixing
- 1998: Dionne Sings Dionne, Dionne Warwick—Engineer
- 1998: Eight Days of Ecstasy, Pamela Williams—Engineer
- 1998: Explore, Various Artists—Engineer
- 1998: Here We Go Again, Dazz Band—Engineer, Mastering, Mixing
- 1998: Midnight Mood, George Howard—Engineer
- 1998: Pass the Dutchie [EP], Buck-O-Nine—Engineer, Mixing
- 1998: Waste of Mind, Zebrahead—Engineer
- 1999: Deck the Halls (I Hate Christmas), Zebrahead—Engineer, Mixing
- 1999: The Fundamental Elements of Southtown, P.O.D.—Engineer, Mixing
- 1999: Meson Ray, The Ernies—Engineer, Mixing
- 1999: Never Give In: A Tribute to Bad Brains, Various Artists—Mixing
- 1999: Real Me, Zebrahead—Engineer
- 1999: Tribus, Sepultura—Mixing
- 1999: Universal Records Rock Sampler [1999], Various Artists—Engineer

=== 2000s ===
- 2000: Any Given Sunday, Original soundtrack—Engineer
- 2000: The Fundamental Elements of Southtown [Import Bonus Track], P.O.D.—Engineer, Mixing
- 2000: Holy Dogs, Stir—Engineer
- 2000: Passages, Continuum—Engineer
- 2000: Playmate of the Year, Zebrahead—Engineer, Loops, Production
- 2000: Ready to Rumble, Original soundtrack—Engineer
- 2000: Shame and Her Sister, Far Too Jones—Engineer
- 2001: Bleed the Sky, Reveille—Engineer, Editing
- 2001: Nullset, Nullset—Engineer
- 2001: Pin the Tail on the Honkey, Dislocated Styles—Engineer
- 2001: Satellite, P.O.D.—Editing, Assistant Engineer
- 2001: Street Songs [Deluxe Edition], Rick James—Engineer, Mixing
- 2001: Stupid Fat Americans, Zebrahead—Engineer, Mixing
- 2001: Throwing the Game, Lucky Boys Confusion—Programming, Vocals (background), Engineer
- 2002: Bleed the Sky [Bonus Track], Reveille—Engineer, Digital Editing
- 2002: Life Force Radio, Afu-Ra—Engineer
- 2002: Plays Duke Ellington [Bonus Tracks], Ben Webster—Engineer, Drums
- 2002: Satellite [Japan Bonus Tracks], P.O.D.—Engineer, Digital Editing, Mixing
- 2002: Street Songs [Bonus Tracks], Rick James—Engineer, Mixing
- 2002: Undisputed, Original soundtrack—Engineer
- 2003: Freddy vs. Jason, Original soundtrack-Mixing
- 2003: Rebirth of the Cool, Rayford Griffin—Engineer
- 2003: Story of My Life, Roez Boyz—Mixing
- 2004: Michael Jackson: The Ultimate Collection, Michael Jackson—Engineer
- 2005: No Boundaries, Ladysmith Black Mambazo—Executive Producer, Art Direction
- 2006: Greatest Hits: The Atlantic Years, P.O.D.—Engineer
- 2008: Against/Nation, Sepultura—Mixing
