= The Fundamental Elements of Southtown =

1999 studio album by P.O.D.

Studio album by P.O.D.
- Released: August 24, 1999
- Studio: Mates Studios (North Hollywood); Sparky Dark Studios (Calabasas); The Gallery (Sherman Oaks)
- Genre: Nu metal; rap metal; Christian metal; rapcore
- Length: 57:40
- Label: Atlantic
- Producer: Howard Benson

P.O.D. chronology
| The Warriors EP (1998) | The Fundamental Elements of Southtown (1999) | Satellite (2001) |

Alternative cover
- Censored cover

Singles from The Fundamental Elements of Southtown
- 1. "Southtown" Released: February 2000; 2. "Rock the Party (Off the Hook)" Released: August 2000

The Fundamental Elements of Southtown is the third studio album and major label debut by American Christian nu metal band P.O.D., released on August 24, 1999, by Atlantic Records. The song "Southtown" was re-recorded from The Warriors EP (1998), a transitional EP from Rescue Records to Atlantic Records. The album includes a cover of U2's 1987 single "Bullet the Blue Sky".

The Fundamental Elements of Southtown went on to become the band's first platinum album, peaking at No. 51 on the Billboard 200 chart in April 2000. It was the 143rd best-selling album of 2000 in the United States. "Southtown" and "Rock the Party (Off the Hook)" became the album's singles in 2000, both of which were accompanied by music videos. An EP, Limited Edition Bonus CD, was given away for free with the purchase of the album and contains six songs.

== Background and recording ==
In 1998, P.O.D. signed a record deal with Atlantic Records. The band stayed with the label for eight years before announcing that they would be splitting from Atlantic Records in August 2006. Prior to signing with Atlantic Records, P.O.D. released their material through Rescue Records, the most notable of which included Snuff the Punk (1994), the band's first studio album, and Brown (1996), their second studio album. The other releases from P.O.D. on Rescue Records include the band's 1993 demo and a live album, Payable on Death Live, in 1997.

The same year the band was signed to Atlantic Records, P.O.D.'s first EP, The Warriors EP, was released on Tooth & Nail Records. Of the included seven songs on the EP, only "Southtown" would be re-recorded for P.O.D.'s third studio album. Only 30,000 units of The Warriors EP were produced. In 1999, P.O.D.'s Demo EP by Atlantic Records contained demos of material that would later be re-recorded for The Fundamental Elements of Southtown, which included "Southtown" and "Lie Down," as well as early versions of the songs "Rock the Party (Off the Hook)" and "Image" titled "Cutz" and "Breathe," respectively.

The Fundamental Elements of Southtown was recorded at three studios in California. The album was mixed at Image Recordings in Los Angeles and The Gallery in Sherman Oaks. According to bassist Traa Daniels during an interview in February 2000, the album was recorded in "about three months". In December 2012, vocalist Sonny Sandoval said the following about working with producer Howard Benson and being signed to a major record label:

He allowed us not only to be ourselves but at the same time we were so stoked to have somebody that actually cared about our music. He gave us this advice and we took it and obviously you're in a real studio and have real instruments. I remember Atlantic Records gave us a budget and we all went out and bought guitars and cabinets just because all our stuff was ghetto. This was big for us.

== Release ==
To promote The Fundamental Elements of Southtown, a cassette tape with the songs "Southtown" and "Rock the Party (Off the Hook)" was released by Atlantic Records in 1999. "Set Your Eyes to Zion" was included on The Mark: A Soundtrack and WOW Hits 2001 in 2000. The album's two singles, "Southtown" and "Rock the Party (Off the Hook)," received music videos that were produced by Angela Jones and directed by Marcos Siega; both music videos would later be included on P.O.D.'s home video release Still Payin' Dues, released on November 12, 2002. The album was certified gold by the RIAA (Recording Industry Association of America) on March 29, 2000, and later certified platinum on November 6, 2000.

=== Cover art ===
When The Fundamental Elements of Southtown was sold in Christian stores, a censored version of the artwork was used for the album's front cover. Retailers complained about the depiction of a cigar and argued that the artwork featured "pagan" imagery according to a Deseret News article from September 2002.

=== Touring ===
P.O.D. was a special guest band on Korn's European tour in 2000. The band also performed at Ozzfest that same year. Later that year, P.O.D. embarked on the "Kings of The Game" tour with special guests Hed PE, Linkin Park, and Project 86. The tour began at Bogart's in Cincinnati, Ohio on October 23, 2000, and ended at Cox Arena in San Diego, California on December 8, 2000; Dogwood and Living Sacrifice would replace Linkin Park and Hed PE as special guests at concerts from November 30 onwards.

== Critical reception ==
Professional ratings
Review scores
| Source | Rating |
|---|---|
| AllMusic | 3.5/5 stars |
| Cross Rhythms | 10/10 squares |
| HM | |
| Jesus Freak Hideout | 4/5 stars |
| PopMatters | 4.8/10 |
| Q | 3/5 stars |
| The Whipping Post | 8/10 stars |

The Fundamental Elements of Southtown received positive reviews from critics. Cross Rhythms gave the album a perfect score, describing it as "a fine exponent of rap-core at it's [sic] finest, and the best album by P.O.D. thus far." In June 2000, Mark Jenkins of The Washington Post said the album "drops Bob Marley refrains and makes common cause with U2 by covering that band's "Bullet the Blue Sky." Mostly, though, P.O.D. raps and rocks in a vigorous but commonplace manner." New Release Today called the album "a pivotal moment for P.O.D." and "simultaneously sludgy and tight in aesthetic from start to finish." In October 2020, Andrew Voigt of HM said he listened to the album "religiously", saying P.O.D. "offered heaviness, passion, and hope in an innovative way that other bands of that era hadn’t figured out and would later frequently try to imitate."

In September 2017, Loudwire ranked The Fundamental Elements of Southtown as the second best P.O.D. album, saying, "The band’s hunger is infectious on the album" and the "Southtown" single "still sounds impactful and exciting." In January 2019, Loudwire also ranked the album at number 14 on their "15 Best Hard Rock Albums of 1999" list, stating that, "Atlantic picked up one of the brightest young bands of the time," and added "at times it worked well in providing variety, other times not as much, but the promise of what was to come was clearly there." In December 2017, "Set Your Eyes to Zion" and "Southtown" were ranked at number 9 and number 5, respectively, on "The 10 best P.O.D. songs" list by Classic Rock.

In January 2025, Loudwire ranked The Fundamental Elements of Southtown at number 21 on their list of "The Top 50 Nu-Metal Albums of All Time (Ranked)", and said it "amplified the 'coolness' factor and brought more reggae stylings to the band's already successful sound" and the songs "read as fully realized and intentioned." In March 2018, Heaven's Metal Magazine ranked The Fundamental Elements of Southtown at number 69 on their "Top 100 Christian Metal Albums of all Time" list, and stated "this breakthrough release was huge. Their streetwise hardcore/hip-hip/reggae-infused agro metal nicely transcended stereotypes and powerfully paved the way for the monumental and timely Satellite."

== Legacy ==
In an article by Cross Rhythms from February 2001, drummer Wuv Bernardo, following the success of The Fundamental Elements of Southtown and the impact it had on the band, said "We've been full time for six years and now it's stepped up to a different level." Vocalist Sonny Sandoval said P.O.D. had been "completely blown away by the success of the album" according to an interview in July 2021. The band "achieved their initial mainstream success" because of the album according to a piece by Jesus Freak Hideout from October 2011. Riff Magazine, during a September 2024 interview with Sonny Sandoval, stated that the album "spawned a pair of hits and its faith-based message got the attention of the gospel music industry".

In May 2011, producer Howard Benson described the album as "one of the very first rock records made in Pro Tools that became huge." On April 23, 2021, P.O.D. announced on their official YouTube channel a series of livestream concerts called "Satellite Over Southtown". During the series of shows, P.O.D. performed the album live in its entirety on May 27, 2021. In August 2024, David Allen, the designer of P.O.D.'s logo, wrote about The Fundamental Elements of Southtown on Instagram, saying the band "supported me and got me hired by Atlantic as a freelance designer. I got to go on the road and contribute some fun images to this album".

A remixed version of "Freestyle" was featured on the soundtrack to the movie Ready to Rumble in 2000. "Lie Down" was featured on the soundtrack to the film Book of Shadows: Blair Witch 2 in 2000. "Southtown" was featured in the trailer for the film Little Nicky in 2000, though the song was not included on the soundtrack album.

In 2025, Rae Lemeshow-Barooshian of Loudwire included the album in her list of "the top 50 nu-metal albums of all time", ranking it twenty-first.

== Track listing ==
All tracks are written by P.O.D. except where noted.

| No. | Title | Lyrics | Music | Length |
|---|---|---|---|---|
| 1. | "Greetings" | | | 1:29 |
| 2. | "Hollywood" | | | 5:22 |
| 3. | "Southtown^{[a]}^{[b]}^{[c]}^{[d]}" | | | 4:08 |
| 4. | "Checkin' Levels" | | | 1:05 |
| 5. | "Rock the Party (Off the Hook)^{[b]}^{[d]}^{1}" (featuring Lisa Papineau) | | | 3:24 |
| 6. | "Lie Down^{[b]}^{[c]}" | | | 5:08 |
| 7. | "Set Your Eyes to Zion^{[d]}^{[e]}" | | | 4:06 |
| 8. | "Lo Siento" (instrumental) | | | 0:33 |
| 9. | "Bullet the Blue Sky" (U2 cover) (featuring Lisa Papineau) | Bono; The Edge | U2 | 5:18 |
| 10. | "Psalm 150" | | | 0:55 |
| 11. | "Image^{[b]}^{2}" | | | 3:32 |
| 12. | "Shouts" | | | 0:55 |
| 13. | "Tribal" | | | 4:26 |
| 14. | "Freestyle" | | | 3:57 |
| 15. | "Follow Me" | | | 3:43 |
| 16. | "Outkast" (ends at 4:17, hidden instrumental track "Tambura" begins at 6:26) | | | 9:32 |
| Total length: | | | | 57:40 |

^{a} Demo recording appears on The Warriors EP (1998)
^{b} Demo recording appears on Demo EP (1999)
^{c} Demo recording appears on Limited Edition Bonus CD (1999)
^{d} Song appears on Greatest Hits: The Atlantic Years compilation (2006)
^{e} Acoustic version appears on SoCal Sessions (2014)

== Awards ==
=== 2000 Billboard Video Music Awards ===
- Best New Artist Clip, Modern Rock – "Rock the Party (Off the Hook)" (Nominated)

=== 2000 GMA Dove Awards ===
- Hard Music Album – The Fundamental Elements of Southtown (Nominated)
- Hard Music Recorded Song – "Southtown" (Nominated)

=== 2000 San Diego Music Awards ===
- Album of the Year – The Fundamental Elements of Southtown (Won)
- Song of the Year – "Rock the Party (Off the Hook)" (Won)

=== 2001 GMA Dove Awards ===
- Modern Rock/Alternative Recorded Song – "Rock the Party (Off the Hook)" (Nominated)
- Rock Recorded Song – "Set Your Eyes to Zion" (Nominated)
- Short Form Music Video of the Year – "Rock the Party (Off the Hook)" (Won)

== Personnel ==
Credits adapted from the album's liner notes.

P.O.D.

- Sonny Sandoval – vocals
- Marcos Curiel – lead guitar
- Traa Daniels – bass guitar
- Wuv Bernardo – drums

Additional musicians

- Howard Benson – keyboards
- Lisa Papineau – background vocals (5, 9)
- Santos – percussion
- Darren "DJ Circa" Tanzella – turntables

Production

- Howard Benson – producer, mixing
- Robert Green Brooks – engineer, mixing
- Chris Lord-Alge – mixing (2, 3, 5, 7, 9)
- Gavin Lurssen – mastering at The Mastering Lab (Hollywood, California)
- Marc Moncrief, Matt Silva, Ernie Vigil – assistant engineers

Additional personnel

- David Nathan Allen – band logo
- Eric Altenburger – band photo retouching
- Chapman Baehler – band photos
- Jean Bastarache – paintings
- John Rubeli – A&R
- P.O.D. – art direction

== Charts ==
=== Weekly charts ===
Weekly chart performance for The Fundamental Elements of Southtown
| Chart (1999–2000) | Peak position |
|---|---|
| New Zealand Albums (RMNZ) | 32 |
| US Billboard 200 | 51 |

=== Year-end charts ===
Year-end chart performance for The Fundamental Elements of Southtown
| Chart (2000) | Position |
|---|---|
| US Billboard 200 | 143 |

== Certifications ==
Certifications for The Fundamental Elements of Southtown
| Region | Certification | Certified units/sales |
|---|---|---|
| United States (RIAA) | Platinum | 1,000,000^{^} |
^{^} Shipments figures based on certification alone.

== Limited Edition Bonus CD ==
Limited Edition Bonus EP

EP by P.O.D.
- Released: August 24, 1999
- Genre: Nu metal; rap metal; Christian metal; rapcore
- Length: 18:51
- Label: Atlantic
- Producer: P.O.D.

The Limited Edition Bonus CD is an EP released on Atlantic Records in 1999. The EP contains six songs, which include "Warriors Come Out to Play...," a new recording of "Draw the Line" (from Snuff the Punk), "It's About Time," a demo version of The Fundamental Elements of Southtown track "Lie Down," the instrumental "Estrella," and a track titled "Messages for Your Answering Machine."

=== Track listing ===
| No. | Title | Length |
|---|---|---|
| 1. | "Warriors Come Out to Play..." | 0:40 |
| 2. | "Draw the Line" (Fundamental version) | 3:16 |
| 3. | "It's About Time" (Demo) | 4:13 |
| 4. | "Lie Down" (Demo) | 4:23 |
| 5. | "Estrella" (Demo) (instrumental) | 4:33 |
| 6. | "Messages for Your Answering Machine" | 1:42 |
| Total length: | | 18:51 |

== Notes ==
^{1.} "Rock the Party (Off the Hook)" demo titled "Cutz" on Demo EP (1999).

^{2.} "Image" demo titled "Breathe" on Demo EP (1999).
