= Rock the Party (Off the Hook) =

Single by P.O.D.

from the album The Fundamental Elements of Southtown
- Released: August 2000 (rock radio)
- Recorded: 1999
- Genre: Nu metal; rap metal
- Length: 3:25
- Label: Atlantic
- Songwriter(s): Noah Bernardo; Marcos Curiel; Traa Daniels; Sonny Sandoval
- Producer(s): Howard Benson

P.O.D. singles chronology
"Southtown" (1999)	"Rock the Party (Off the Hook)" (2000)	"School of Hard Knocks" (2000)

"Rock the Party (Off the Hook)" is a song by American Christian metal band P.O.D. It was released in August 2000 as the second single from their third studio album and major label debut, The Fundamental Elements of Southtown (1999). An early recording of the song titled "Cutz" appeared on the band's Demo EP in 1999. A remixed version of the song, "Rock the Party (RTP Remix)", was included on Satellite: 20th Anniversary Expanded Edition in 2021. In 2008, the music video for "Rock the Party (Off the Hook)" was included at No. 18 on TVU's 50 Best Videos of All Time list.

== Music video ==
The song's music video, directed by Marcos Siega and produced by Angela Jones, consists mainly of P.O.D. driving a tour bus and picking up fans. The video ends with the band performing the song on a stage in front of a crowd. The music video for "Rock the Party (Off the Hook)" was included on P.O.D.'s VHS/DVD Still Payin' Dues, released on November 12, 2002.

== Track listing ==
US promo single

No.	Title	Length
1.	"Rock the Party (Off the Hook)"	3:25

German promo single

No.	Title	Length
1.	"Rock the Party (Off the Hook)"	3:24
2.	"Freestyle (Rock Mix)"	3:52
3.	"Sabbath" (instrumental)	4:32

== Chart and sales ==
Chart (2000)	Peak position
U.S. Billboard Hot Mainstream Rock Tracks	25
U.S. Billboard Hot Modern Rock Tracks	27

== Awards ==
Billboard Video Music Awards

- 2000 – Best New Artist Clip, Modern Rock (Nominated)

San Diego Music Awards

- 2000 – Song of the Year (Won)

Dove Awards

- 2001 – Modern Rock/Alternative Recorded Song (Nominated)
- 2001 – Short Form Music Video of the Year (Won)

== Appearances in media ==
It was featured in the 2000 film Little Nicky. "Rock the Party (Off the Hook)" was included in the PlayStation version of the video game MTV Sports: T.J. Lavin's Ultimate BMX, released on March 21, 2001. The song was included in the comedy television series Pen15 on Hulu.
