= Bleed the Sky =

Bleed the Sky may refer to:

- Bleed the Sky (band), a five-piece metalcore band originating from Mission Viejo, California
  - Bleed the Sky (EP), their 2004 EP
- Bleed the Sky (album), the 2001 studio album by rap metal group Reveille
