= Southtown (song) =

Single by P.O.D.

from the album The Fundamental Elements of Southtown
- Released: February 2000 (rock radio)
- Recorded: November 17, 1998 (The Warriors EP version); February–April 1999
- Genre: Nu metal; rap metal
- Length: 4:08
- Label: Atlantic
- Songwriters: Noah Bernardo; Marcos Curiel; Traa Daniels; Sonny Sandoval
- Producer: Howard Benson

P.O.D. singles chronology
"Southtown" (2000)	"Rock the Party (Off the Hook)" (2000)

Music video
- "Southtown" on YouTube

"Southtown" is a song by American Christian metal band P.O.D. It was released in February 2000 as the first single from the band's third studio album and major label debut, The Fundamental Elements of Southtown (1999). An earlier version of the song originally appeared on The Warriors EP in 1998. A demo version of the song was included on P.O.D.'s Demo EP in 1999. In December 2017, "Southtown" was ranked at #5 on "The 10 best P.O.D. songs" list by Louder Sound, saying, "The guitars are heavy, the vocals are heavy, the lyrics are heavy, the drums are heavy. This is a P.O.D. song that brought honest rap lyrics to Headbanger’s Ball."

== Music video ==
The song's music video was directed by Marcos Siega, produced by Angela Jones, edited by David Mendel, and photographed by cinematographer Steve Gainer, ASC ASK. It features the band performing amongst a crowd. According to an interview with the band in February 2000, the music video was filmed in "two days". The music video for "Southtown" was included on P.O.D.'s VHS/DVD Still Payin' Dues, released on November 12, 2002.

== Track listing ==
US promo single

No.	Title	Length
1.	"Southtown"	4:07
2.	"Southtown" (Intro edit)	3:33

German promo single

No.	Title	Length
1.	"Southtown" (Album version)	4:07

Australian promo single

No.	Title	Length
1.	"Southtown"	4:07

== Chart and sales ==
Chart (2000)	Peak position
U.S. Billboard Hot Mainstream Rock Tracks	31
U.S. Billboard Hot Modern Rock Tracks	28

== Awards ==
Dove Awards

- 2000 – Hard Music Recorded Song (Nominated)

== Covers ==
The song was covered by American metalcore band the Ghost Inside for the 2014 cover compilation album Punk Goes 90s Vol. 2.

== Appearances in media ==
"Southtown" was included in the trailer for the 2000 film Little Nicky; the song, however, was not included on the soundtrack album.
