= Boom (P.O.D. song) =

2002 single by P.O.D.

Single by P.O.D.

from the album Satellite
- Released: April 8, 2002
- Studio: Bay 7 (Valley Village, California); Sparky Dark (Calabasas, California)
- Genre: Rap metal; nu metal; rap rock
- Length: 3:08
- Label: Atlantic
- Songwriters: Noah Bernardo; Marcos Curiel; Traa Daniels; Sonny Sandoval
- Producer: Howard Benson

P.O.D. singles chronology
"Youth of the Nation" (2001)	"Boom" (2002)	"Satellite" (2002)

Music video
- "Boom" on YouTube

"Boom" is a song by American Christian metal band P.O.D. It was released on April 8, 2002, as the third single from their fourth studio album, Satellite (2001). While it did not chart as well as the album's previous singles, the song has appeared significantly in film and television. "Boom (The Crystal Method remix)" was included on the remix album Community Service and as a bonus track on the special edition re-release of Satellite available August 27, 2002. A limited edition, gatefold picture disc of the single was also available in the UK.

The single's release followed a highly successful yet dark, brooding tone in "Youth of the Nation". Guitarist Marcos Curiel stated, "We wanted to go back to the spirit we had with 'Alive' and have a song that encourages people to be happy and thankful that they're alive... We wanted to say, 'Let's not forget how to have fun this time.' 'Boom' is just raw, in your face. When we play it live, the crowd just goes nuts. Fists are in the air and the pit's going."

Following the September 11, 2001 attacks, "Boom" was the only P.O.D. song included on the list of songs deemed inappropriate by Clear Channel Communications. In December 2017, "Boom" was ranked at number four on "The 10 best P.O.D. songs" list by Louder Sound. The same year, Annie Zaleski of Spin named it the eighth-best nu metal track of all time.

== Music and lyrics ==
"Boom" has often served as the opening song at P.O.D.'s concerts. According to Annie Zaleski of Spin, "the song's choruses are powder keg blasts of aggression [and] defiance." The song's lyrics revolve around the band and their San Diego background, describing the group's rise to popularity with lines like "rock the masses, from Madrid to Calabasas." However, the explosive, multitracked "Boom!" of the chorus gives the song its impact and versatility as a soundtrack piece. In contrast to P.O.D.'s more faith-oriented tracks, "Boom" has been described by vocalist Sonny Sandoval as "just a fun rock song."

== Music video ==
The music video for "Boom" was recorded in the first quarter of 2002 and directed by Gavin Bowden, debuting in May with heavy rotation on MTV2 and MMUSA. It revolves around a table tennis (aka: Ping Pong) tournament between the band, dressed in orange jumpsuits, and a Swedish team played by fellow Christian metal group Blindside. The latter group was heavily supported by P.O.D. during this time and signed by them under the Elektra Records subsidiary, 3 Points. The teams are evenly matched until Traa Daniels performs a comically impressive move to win the game, enraging their opponents.

Regarding the video, Curiel stated in 2008, "The funny thing is, people take us really seriously. We are a serious band, but we know that, at times, we don't have to take ourselves so seriously. We have fun. That's why we went ahead and did a video like 'Boom.' We wanted to show people that we could have fun. They have a movie out now called Balls of Fury, but we did that same topic back in the day."

The music video for "Boom" was No. 8 on TVU's 50 Best Videos of All Time list in 2008. In 2018, the staff of Metal Hammer included the music video in the site's list of "the 13 best nu metal videos".

In June 2023, Metal Injection included "Boom" on their "10 Greatest Nü-Metal Music Videos" list, describing it as "So. Much. Fun. Nü-metal took itself too seriously at times, and P.O.D.'s video for "Boom" was the antidote."

== Awards ==
=== 2002 San Diego Music Awards ===
- Song of the Year

=== 2003 GMA Dove Awards ===
- Hard Music Recorded Song of the Year

== Track listing ==
1. "Boom"
2. "Set it Off" (Tweaker Mix)
3. "Hollywood" (Live)

== Charts ==
=== Weekly charts ===
Chart (2002)	Peak position
Australia (ARIA)	43
Germany (GfK)	83
Sweden (Sverigetopplistan)	38
U.S. Bubbling Under Hot 100 Singles (Billboard)	23
U.S. Mainstream Rock Tracks (Billboard)	21
U.S. Modern Rock Tracks (Billboard)	13

=== Year-end charts ===
Chart (2002)	Position
U.S. Modern Rock Tracks (Billboard)	53

== Certifications ==
Region	Certification	Certified units/sales
New Zealand (RMNZ)	Gold	15,000^{‡}
^{‡} Sales+streaming figures based on certification alone.

== Release history ==
Region	Date	Format(s)	Label(s)	Ref.
United States	April 8, 2002	Alternative radio	Atlantic	
United States	April 15, 2002	Mainstream rock; active rock radio	Atlantic	
Australia	June 24, 2002	CD	Atlantic	

== In popular culture ==
- The song appeared in the movies Rollerball, Grind, NASCAR 3D: The IMAX Experience, and Here Comes the Boom, the latter which was named after a lyric from the song.
- The remixed version of the song by The Crystal Method was included on the soundtrack to the 2003 film Biker Boyz.
- It was used by WWE for their Saturday Night's Main Event program from 2006 to 2008.
- It was used in a trailer for the 2011 video game Bulletstorm.
- The song was featured in the third episode of Season 4 of Brooklyn Nine-Nine.
- The song was included in the 2013 video game Rocksmith 2014 as downloadable content in the "P.O.D. Song Pack" on May 14, 2019.
- The song was used in Helldivers 2's Xbox release announcement trailer
