= Daylight Division =

American rock band

- Origin: United States
- Genre: Alternative rock
- Years active: 2009–2011, 2022-present
- Members: Marcos Curiel; Joe Loeffler; Dave Buckner; Lukas Rossi

Daylight Division is an American rock band formed in 2009. The group consists of members from P.O.D., Papa Roach, and Chevelle.

== History ==
Marcos Curiel (P.O.D.) and Dave Buckner (Papa Roach) were introduced to each other by a mutual friend and Marcos then invited Joe Loeffler (Chevelle), a longtime friend, to join. The band's original singer was Lukas Rossi (of Rock Star Supernova fame), who joined in June 2009, but parted ways with the band shortly thereafter. The band took part in charity concerts supporting Chi of Deftones, along with Lit, P.O.D., The Letter Black and many more. Failing to find a permanent lead vocalist, Daylight Division ended in 2011. In 2012 it was announced that Dave Buckner and Lukas Rossi joined forces again to form The Halo Method with Ben Moody of Evanescence and Josh Newell of In This Moment.

In 2022, the band reformed with all original members being retained. They released a teaser for their song "Blue" via Instagram in January, and later released their debut single "Live Again" on March 11. The band later released their debut self-titled EP on February 13, 2026.

== Band members ==
- Marcos Curiel - guitar
- Joe Loeffler - bass
- Dave Buckner - drums
- Lukas Rossi - vocals

== Discography ==
=== EPs ===
Title	Details	Ref
Daylight Divison	Released: February 13, 2026; Formats: Streaming	

=== Singles ===
Title	Year	Album	Ref
"Live Again"	2022	Daylight Division	
