= Laced (album) =

Studio album by Reveille
- Released: June 22, 1999
- Recorded: 1998–1999
- Studio: Long View Studios in North Brookfield, Massachusetts
- Genre: Nu metal, rap metal
- Label: Elektra
- Producer: Steve Thompson

Reveille chronology
Reveille (1998)	Laced (1999)	Bleed the Sky (2001)

Singles from Laced
- 1. "Flesh and Blood" Released: February 4, 1999; 2. "Permanent (Take a Look Around)" Released: August 26, 1999; 3. "The Phoenix" Released: December 20, 1999

Professional ratings
Review scores
Source	Rating
AllMusic	2.5/5 stars

Laced is the debut album by American nu metal band Reveille. It was released on June 22, 1999, through Elektra Records. The album contains the majority of the songs from the six-track demo that initially got the attention of major label Elektra.

The band members were all between the ages of 16 and 19 when the album was recorded.

The album artwork was created by Clive Barker. The album had sold over 100,000 copies before the release of Bleed the Sky.

== Critical reception ==
CMJ New Music Monthly wrote that "Reveille is to Rage Against The Machine what Silverchair was to Nirvana, but the blatant aural similarities don't necessarily mean that Reveille should be pigeonholed as a cheap knockoff."

== Track listing ==
No.	Title	Length
1.	"Butterfly"	4:09
2.	"Perfect World"	5:25
3.	"Permanent (Take a Look Around)"	4:06
4.	"The Phoenix"	3:38
5.	"Untied"	3:02
6.	"Rise and Blind"	3:34
7.	"Judas"	4:44
8.	"Flesh and Blood"	3:39
9.	"Feel"	4:02
10.	"Aftertaste"	4:41
11.	"Splitt (Comin' Out Swingin')" (featuring B-Real)	3:59
12.	"Dark Horizons" (includes hidden track with producer Steve Thompson playing an acoustic version of "Flesh and Blood")	14:33

== Personnel ==
- Drew Simollardes – vocals
- Steve Miloszewski – guitar
- Greg Sullivan – guitar
- Carl Randolph – bass
- Justin Wilson – drums
