= Trickside =

- Origin: New York City
- Genres: Pop, Pop rock
- Years active: 2001-2002
- Labels: Wind-Up Records
- Past members: Jeff Mendelsohn; David Mendelsohn

Trickside was an American pop duo from New York City from 2001 to 2002. The group was most known for their single, "Under You", which was featured in the soundtrack of the film On the Line. The group was composed of brothers Jeff and David Mendelsohn. The group remained inactive after 2002.

== History ==
Trickside was composed of brothers Jeff Mendelsohn and David Mendelsohn of New York City. The band’s name "Trickside" came from a childhood playing card game. The band's single "Under You" was included on the soundtrack to the film On the Line, and reached #27 on the Billboard Adult Top 40 charts in 2001. Marcos Siega shot the music video for the song. Their album, Trickside featured 11 tracks. The group was inactive after 2002.

== Discography ==
- Trickside (Wind-Up Records, 2001)
