= Genuflect (band) =

American nu metal band

Background information
- Origin: Boston, Massachusetts, United States
- Genres: Nu metal; rap metal
- Years active: 2005–2011, 2013–2015
- Label: Unsigned
- Members: Drew Simollardes; Greg Sullivan; Steve Hart

Genuflect was an American nu metal band from Boston, Massachusetts, United States, composed of former members of Reveille. Genuflect's lyrical message lashes out against social, political and economic corruption. The band formed in 2005 and released LPs in 2007 and 2009. They went into hiatus in 2011, however Genuflect reformed in August 2013 and were working on new music before disbanding in 2015.

== History ==
=== The End of the World, The Shadow Side and hiatus (2005-2011) ===
In 2005, former founding Reveille members reunited to form Genuflect. The band was a new project by Drew Simollardes and Greg Sullivan, the vocalist and the guitarist respectively, from the national act Reveille, who previously toured on Ozzfest with Pantera, Soulfly and Disturbed; and also toured nationally with Sevendust, Static-X, Godsmack, Powerman 5000, Kid Rock, and Machine Head.

Genuflect has released two full-length albums to date. Their debut record The End of the World was released in 2007, and was followed by The Shadow Side, released in 2009. Genuflect headlined national tours in 2008 and again in 2009 promoting their two albums to a loyal underground fan following. The band went on hiatus in 2011.

=== Reunion and new album (2013-2015) ===
Genuflect reunited in August 2013, and has begun writing a new album. The new album is set to be released during the summer of 2014. The band stated via Facebook that the new album will be released in October. A Rose From the Dead was released on October 31.

Two live shows occurred:

12/19/2014 - The Middle East - Cambridge, MA - Nullset / Genuflect / Escape To Everything / Carolina Burn

07/17/2015 - The Ruins at The Colosseum - Providence, RI - Black Sheep Presents: GENUFLECT / JOINT DAMAGE / 6 Foot Silence / Fear The Masses

== Musical style and influences ==
Genuflect is described as nu metal and rap metal.

The band is influenced by the likes of Rage Against the Machine, Cypress Hill, Run-DMC, Faith No More, and 24-7 Spyz.

Genuflect is wired for political and social agitation. Song after song (Genuflect) picks a target and unloads. The misleading politicking that set the stage for the war in Iraq, the sex scandals involving members of the clergy, the idea of terrorists killing in the name of God, and the social decay brought on by a culture overfed on celebrity news but starved of meaningful discussion are some of the topics raised on 'The End of the World' ... a relentlessly hard-sounding album.

— The Worcester Telegram and Gazette

Genuflect...is less rap and more metal than Reveille, but stays true to the hardcore sound that gave Reveille its edge. Street-smart songs such as 'Potent' and 'Kill Shot' delve into societal ills like crime and drugs with genuine passion and explosiveness. Could a rap-rock resurgence be upon us?

— The Boston Herald

== Discography ==
=== Rough Mix Demo (2005) ===
1. Revelation
2. Bloody Murder
3. Move
4. Afterlife
5. Masquerade
6. Dark As Night
7. Open Up

=== The End of the World (2007) ===
1. Bloody Murder
2. Potent
3. Masquerade
4. Dead Right
5. Here and Now
6. Epinephrine
7. Insurrection
8. Looking Glass
9. Open Up
10. Dark As Night
11. Kill Shot
12. Afterlife
13. Revelation

=== The Shadow Side (2009) ===
1. Head Hearse
2. Lonely Road
3. Bullet
4. Devil Dance
5. Curtain Call
6. Lavation
7. Ring In The Dead
8. Dying Today
9. SlowlyFallingFaster
10. Long Way Home
11. Nihilist

=== A Rose From the Dead (2014) ===
1. Wither Within
2. Gather In The Streets
3. Laughing As We Fall
4. Riot On The Set
5. No Reason
6. Till We Burn
7. Once In Your Life
8. Fishbowl
9. Futura
10. Identity
11. Today’s The Day

== Band members ==
Referred to as "The Four Horsemen".

Current

- Drew Simollardes - vocals (2005-2011, 2013–2015)
- Greg Sullivan - guitar, vocals (2005-2011, 2013–2015)
- Steve Hart - bass (2005-2007, 2013–2015)
- Bryan Bales - drums (2014-2015)

Former

- Mike Geezil - drums (2005)
- Scott Wilson - drums (2006)
- Jeff Lawn - drums (2007-2011)
- John Boudreau - bass (2007-2008)
- Tim Munroe - bass (2008-2011)
