= Satellite (P.O.D. song) =

2002 single by P.O.D.

Single by P.O.D.

from the album Satellite
- B-side: "Critic"; "Youth of the Nation" (remix)
- Released: August 5, 2002
- Studio: Bay 7 (Valley Village, California); Sparky Dark (Calabasas, California)
- Length: 3:30
- Label: Atlantic
- Songwriters: Noah Bernardo; Marcos Curiel; Traa Daniels; Sonny Sandoval
- Producer: Howard Benson

P.O.D. singles chronology
"Boom" (2002)	"Satellite" (2002)	"Sleeping Awake" (2003)

Music video
- "Satellite" on YouTube

"Satellite" is a song by American Christian metal band P.O.D. and the title track of their fourth studio album, Satellite (2001), released on August 5, 2002, as the fourth and final single from the album. The single's release was accompanied by a music video containing live footage of the band's performance at the Virginia Beach Amphitheater during FM99's Lunatic Luau 6 on July 21, 2002, as well as separate performance footage filmed in the woods.

== Track listing ==
European and Australia CD single

1. "Satellite"
2. "Critic"
3. "Youth of the Nation" (Mike$ki remix)

== Charts ==
Chart (2002)	Peak position
U.S. Mainstream Rock Tracks (Billboard)	15
U.S. Modern Rock Tracks (Billboard)	21

== Release history ==
Region	Date	Format(s)	Label(s)	Ref.
United States	August 5, 2002	Mainstream rock; active rock; alternative radio	Atlantic	
Australia	October 21, 2002	CD	Atlantic	
