= Marcos Siega =

American director

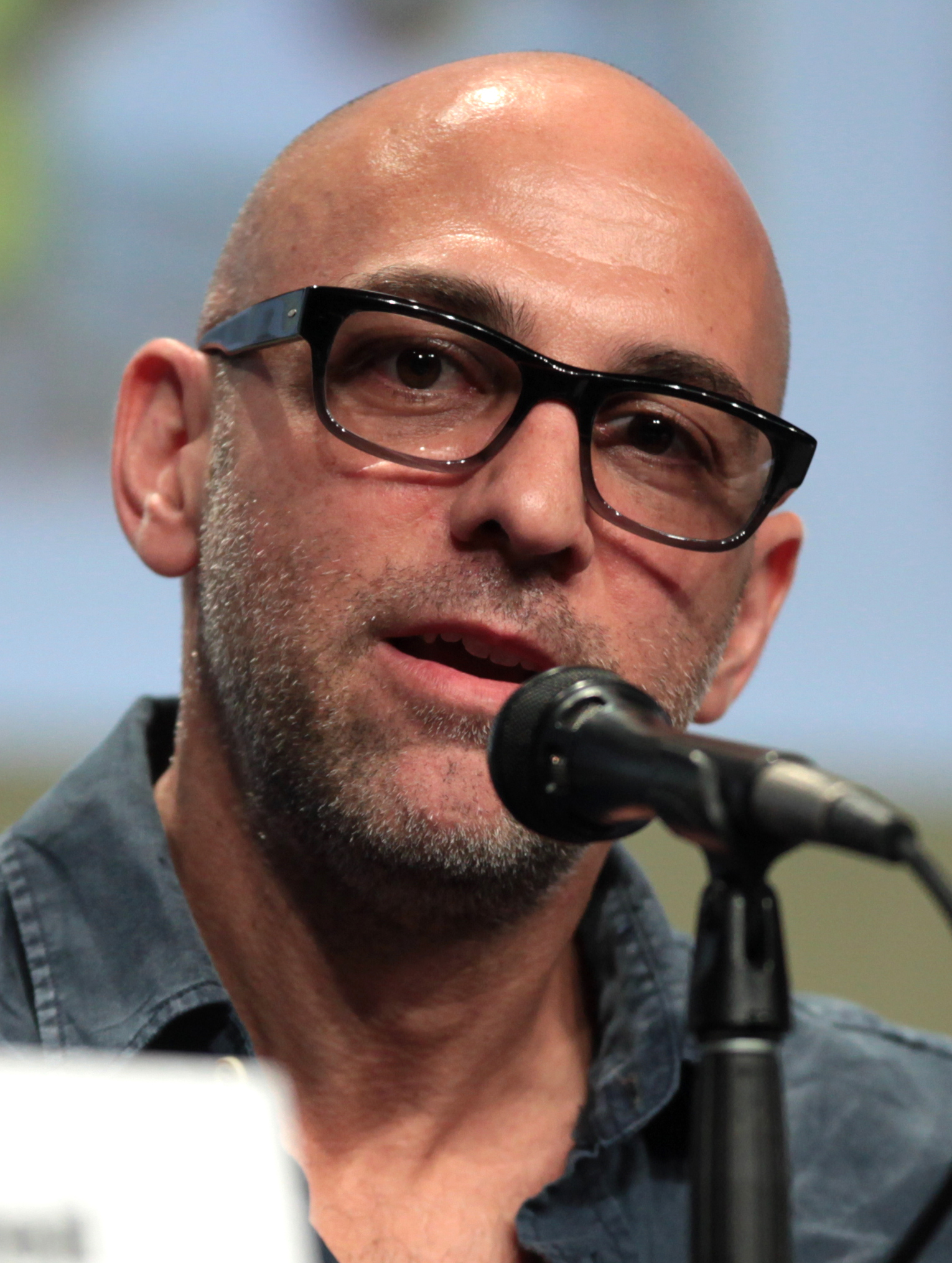
- Siega at the 2014 San Diego Comic-Con
- Born: New York City, New York, U.S.
- Occupations: Director, producer, musician
- Children: 3

Marcos Siega is a film, television, commercial and music video director. He has also worked as a producer, a musician and an artist.

== Career ==
In the late 1980s, he helped to form the New York–based punk band Bad Trip, releasing two full-length records and numerous EPs. He later began directing music videos for Weezer, System of a Down, P.O.D., Papa Roach, Blink-182 and The All-American Rejects. His 2000 video for Blink-182's "All the Small Things" earned three MTV Video Music Award nominations and the Papa Roach video "Broken Home" was nominated for a Grammy. In 2001, he signed with commercial production company Hungry Man.

Siega has directed episodes of television series, including Dexter, True Blood, Cold Case and Veronica Mars. In 2008, he directed the pilot and co-executive produced The Vampire Diaries, which ran for eight seasons on the CW Network. Siega also directed the pilots and was executive producer of The Following, Charlie's Angels, Time after Time, The Passage and God Friended Me.

Pretty Persuasion, his 2005 film, was nominated for a Grand Jury Prize at the Sundance Film Festival and won the German Independence Award at the Oldenburg International Film Festival.

== Filmography ==
- Stung (1999)
- Pretty Persuasion (2005)
- Underclassman (2005)
- Chaos Theory (2008)

=== Television director ===
- Rock the House (2002) – several episodes
- Fastlane (2002) – two episodes
- Oliver Beene (2003)
- Veronica Mars (2004) – three episodes
- Cold Case (2005) – several episodes
- Eyes (2005)
- Life (2007)
- Shark (2007) – several episodes
- The Nine (2007)
- Traveler (2007)
- Dexter (2007–2009) – 9 episodes
- True Blood Episode 7 (2008)
- October Road (2008)
- The Vampire Diaries (2009) – pilot and several episodes
- Outlaw (2010) – multiple episodes
- Charlie's Angels (2011) – pilot and several episodes
- The Following (2012–2015) – Pilot and Multiple episodes
- Blindspot (2015–2016) – several episodes
- Time After Time (2017) – several episodes
- You (2018) – multiple episodes
- God Friended Me (2018–2020) – several episodes
- The Passage (2019) – pilot
- Batwoman (2019) – pilot
- The Lost Boys (2020)
- The Flight Attendant (2020) – several episodes
- Dexter: New Blood (2021–2022) – 6 episodes
- The Girls on the Bus (2024) – several episodes
- Bad Monkey (2023–2024) – several episodes
- YOU (2024) – several episodes
- Dexter: Resurrection (2025-2026) – 8 episodes

== Music videos ==
- 311 – "Flowing"
- 8stops7 – "Question Everything"
- Alien Ant Farm – "Movies"
- Aimee Allen – "Revolution"
- Amanda – "Everybody Doesn't"
- Anastacia – "Boom"
- Anthrax – "Inside Out", "Fueled" and "Nothing"
- BBMak – "Still on Your Side"
- Bif Naked – "Moment of Weakness"
- Birdbrain – "Youth of America"
- Blink-182 – "All the Small Things", "What's My Age Again?" and "Man Overboard"
- Buckcherry – "Ridin'"
- Chantal Kreviazuk – "Before You"
- Chokebore – "A Taste for Bitters"
- CIV – "Can't Wait One Minute More"
- Collective Soul – "Why, Pt. 2"
- Corrosion of Conformity – "Drowning in a Daydream"
- Cypress Hill featuring Roni Size – "Child of the West"
- Disney Channel Circle of Stars featuring Hilary Duff and Raven-Symoné – "Circle of Life"
- Eels – "Mr. E.'s Beautiful Blues"
- Eve 6 – "Promise" and "Here's to the Night"
- Everclear – "Rock Star"
- Goldfinger – "More Today Than Yesterday"
- Hoku – "Perfect Day"
- Hoobastank – "Crawling in the Dark"
- Ill Niño – "What Comes Around"
- Jars of Clay – "Unforgetful You"
- Jurassic 5 – "The Influence"
- Kelly Osbourne – "Papa Don't Preach"
- Kittywider – "Crazy Weed"
- Lifehouse – "Sick Cycle Carousel" and "Breathing"
- Mest – "Cadillac"
- Our Lady Peace – "Life"
- P.O.D. – "Rock the Party (Off the Hook)", "Southtown" and "Satellite"
- Papa Roach – "Last Resort" and "Broken Home"
- Paramore – "That's What You Get"
- Pete Yorn – "Strange Condition"
- Peter Searcy – "Losing Light Fast"
- Quicksand – "Delusional" and "Thorn in My Side"
- Rival Schools – "Used for Glue"
- Rooney – "Blueside" and "Pop Stars"
- Sara Bareilles – "Bottle It Up"
- Scapegoat Wax – "Lost Cause"
- Sevendust – "Waffle"
- Shades Apart – "Tainted Love"
- Shift – "In Honor of Myself"
- Smoother – "East Side"
- SR-71 – "Right Now"
- Stem – "Pinch"
- System of a Down – "Chop Suey!" and "Toxicity"
- The Actual – "Worst Day of My Life"
- The All-American Rejects – "Swing, Swing" and "Dirty Little Secret"
- The Crystal Method – "Name of the Game" and "You Know It's Hard" (featuring Scott Weiland)
- The Suicide Machines – "Sometimes I Don't Mind"
- Tantric – "Breakdown"
- The Living End – "Roll On"
- Third Day – "You Make Me Mad"
- Toad the Wet Sprocket – "Come Down"
- Tracy Bonham – "Sunshine"
- Trickside – "Under You"
- Trik Turner – "Friends & Family"
- Trust Company – "Downfall"
- The Urge – "Too Much Stereo"
- Ünloco – "Facedown"
- Vanessa Carlton – "Pretty Baby"
- Weezer – "Island in the Sun (Version 1)", "Hash Pipe", "Beverly Hills", "Dope Nose" and "Keep Fishin'"
- will.i.am – "I Am"

== Film and television as producer or executive producer ==
- Stung (1999)
- Rock the House (2002)
- Pretty Persuasion (2005)
- Drive-Thru (2007)
- Barry Munday (2008)
- The Vampire Diaries (2009–11)
- Outlaw (2010)
- Charlie's Angels (2011)
- The Following (2013–15)
- Blindspot (2015)
- You (2018)
- God Friended Me (2018)
- The Passage (2019)
- Batwoman (2019)
- Bad Monkey (2024)
- The Girls on the Bus (2024)
