= On the Line (soundtrack) =

Soundtrack album by Various Artists
- Released: October 16, 2001
- Genre: Teen pop Rock
- Length: 53:33
- Label: Jive
- Producer: JC Chasez, Desmond Child, Jules Gondar, Jimmy Harry, Jared Kotler, Stephen Lipson, Kristian Lundin, Andrew Manzano, Richard Marx, Jonathan McHugh, Roy "Royalty" Hamilton, Dan Muckala, Danny Saber, Jake Schulze, Randy Spendlove

On the Line: Original Motion Picture Soundtrack is the soundtrack album to the film of the same name. It was released on October 16, 2001, via Jive Records.

== Critical reception ==
Professional ratings
Review scores
Source	Rating
AllMusic	2.5/5 stars
Entertainment Weekly	D+

AllMusic's Heather Phares was critical of the tracks performed by BBMak, Robyn and Jessica Folkner, and found the production choices on the remake of Al Green's "Let's Stay Together" to be "an insult to his talent." She commended the contributions from both *NSYNC and Britney Spears, along with the songs by Trickside and Melissa Lefton, but said that "these moments are few and far between on On the Line, a soundtrack that seems more concerned with the bottom line than worthwhile music." Kristen Baldwin of Entertainment Weekly remarked that "Kids dissed Lance Bass and Joey Fatone's feature film debut, On the Line, but they'll probably plunk down babysitting dough for this compilation of homogeneous pop."

== Track listing ==
No.	Title	Writer(s)	Performer(s)	Length
1.	"On the Line"	Steve Diamond, Paul Vann, Mark Hammond	Joey Fatone, Lance Bass, Mandy Moore, Christian Burns and True Vibe	3:18
2.	"That Girl (Will Never Be Mine)"	Kristian Lundin, Jake Schulze, Andreas Carlsson	NSYNC	3:25
3.	"Under You"	Jeff Mendelsohn, David Mendelsohn	Trickside	3:26
4.	"Don't Look Down"	Scott Cutler, Anne Preven	BBMak	3:10
5.	"Let's Stay Together"	Al Green, Willie Mitchell, Al Jackson Jr.	Al Green	4:20
6.	"Let Me Be"	Britney Spears, Brian Kieruff, Josh Schwartz	Britney Spears	3:43
7.	"Falling"	Gary Brown, Chris Kirkpatrick, Bryan Popin, Ira Schickman	NSYNC	2:51
8.	"Do You C What I C?"	Jimmy Harry, Colleen Fitzpatrick	Vitamin C	3:48
9.	"Ready to Fall"	Richard Marx	Joey Fatone	3:28
10.	"To Be Able to Love" (Jonathan Peters Radio Mix)	Lundin, Carlsson	Jessica Folker	3:28
11.	"My Hit Song"	Melissa Lefton, Graham Edwards, Lauren Christy, Scott Spock	Melissa Lefton	3:07
12.	"Say You'll Walk the Distance"	Jorgen Elofsson, Terry Cox, Tommy Ekman	Robyn	3:26
13.	"Take Me On"	Richie Sambora, Desmond Child, Mark Hudson, Gary Burr	Richie Sambora	3:45
14.	"Can't Trust Myself"	Rico Lumpkins, Jasper Cameron, Brandi Williams, Shamari Fears	Blaque	4:52
15.	"Ready to Fall"	Marx	Meredith Edwards	3:38

== Charts ==
Year	Chart	Peak position
2001	US Billboard 200 (Billboard)	35
2001	US Top Soundtracks (Billboard)	2
