= Insolence =

American rap metal band

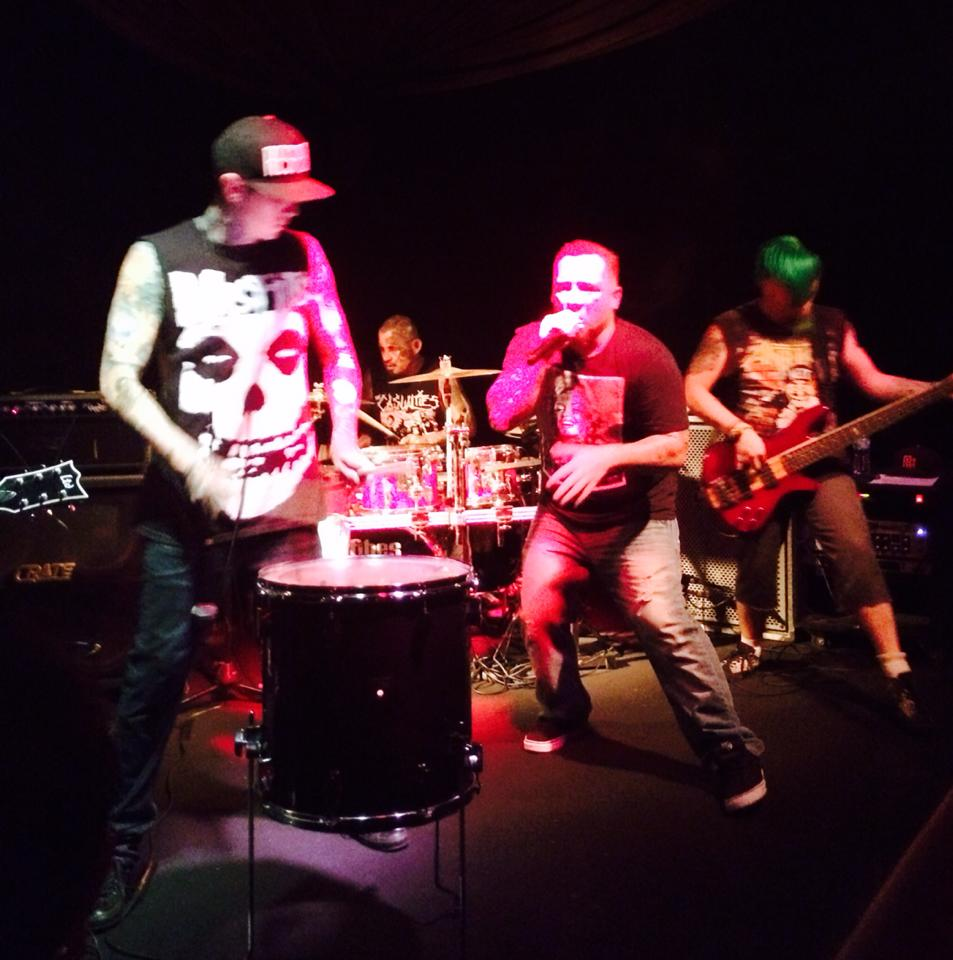
- Insolence performing in 2015

Background information
- Origin: San Jose, California, US
- Genres: Rap metal; nu metal
- Years active: 1995-2010, 2014-present
- Labels: Maverick Records; Warner Records; Powerslave Records
- Members: Marc Herman; Billy "Mecha 1" Rosenthal; Clint Westwood; Michael Rowan; Kevin the Guch; Chris "Ichy" Larson
- Past members: Armando Cardenas; Jerry M. Dalalo; Paul Perry
- Website: insolencemusic.com

Insolence is an American rap metal band from San Jose, California, formed by formed by vocalist Billy "Mecha 1" Rosenthal.

The band toured throughout many countries in Europe in the summers of 1998 and 1999, which has led them to a substantial following in the San Francisco Bay area. The band has toured along with Incubus, System of a Down, Sevendust, Jane's Addiction, Cypress Hill, and much more.

== History ==
Insolence formed in 1995 in San Jose, California, with vocalist Billy Rosenthal, vocalist Mark Herman, bassist Paul Herman, DJ Jerry Dalalo, and drummer Armando Cardenas. The band pursued a thrash metal style with Vicious Circle. It wasn't until 1996 where their rap metal style would be present, with the album Within. They would then release two more albums, with Universal in 1998 and Poisonous Philosophy in 2000. The album's version of the track "Natural High", which would be remade for their next upcoming release, would be used in the soundtrack of the movie Little Nicky.

In 2001, the band would release Revolution. After signing with Maverick Records, this would be their debut to a major label. Two singles were released from this album, with "Poison Well" and "1-2, 1-2", which featured Sen Dog of Cypress Hill.

In 2007, the band hosted a weekly radio show called Audio War Radio on the Japanese radio station InterFM. On the show, they interviewed band members, prank calls, and music by U.S. artists.

Insolence remained to release more albums, with Stand Strong in 2003, Audio War in 2007, (Note: Signed by Powerslave Records) and Project Konflict in 2010, marking a hiatus before 2014, when they eventually returned.

== Musical style ==
Insolence has been mainly described as nu metal and rap metal, with incorporated elements of reggae, hip-hop, punk rock and hardcore.

== Band members ==
Current

- Marc Herman — vocals
- Billy "Mecha 1" Rosenthal — vocals, percussion
- Clint Westwood — bass
- Michael Rowan — guitar
- Kevin the Guch — drums
- Chris "Ichy" Larson — turntables

Former

- Armando Cardenas — drums
- Jerry M. Dalalo — turntables
- Paul Perry — bass

== Discography ==
- Vicious Circle (1995)
- Within (1996)
- Universal (1998)
- Terrorists (1999)
- Poisonous Philosophy (2000)
- Revolution (2001)
- Insolence EP (2003)
- Stand Strong (2003)
- Audio War (2007)
- Rise of the Fallen EP (2016)
- Transition EP (2017)
- Victory EP (2019)
- Truth to Power EP (2021)
