= Satellite (P.O.D. album) =

Studio album by P.O.D.
- Released: September 11, 2001
- Recorded: March – May 2001
- Studios: Bay 7 Studios (Valley Village, California); Sparky Dark Studio (Calabasas)
- Genres: Christian metal; nu metal; rap rock
- Length: 52:57
- Label: Atlantic
- Producer: Howard Benson

P.O.D. chronology
The Fundamental Elements of Southtown (1999)	Satellite (2001)	Payable on Death (2003)

Singles from Satellite
- 1. "Alive" Released: July 31, 2001; 2. "Youth of the Nation" Released: November 27, 2001; 3. "Boom" Released: April 8, 2002; 4. "Satellite" Released: August 5, 2002

Satellite is the fourth studio album by Christian nu metal band P.O.D. It was released by Atlantic Records on September 11, 2001. It was the band's last album with guitarist Marcos Curiel until When Angels and Serpents Dance (2008). According to drummer and backing vocalist Wuv Bernardo, the album is more mature than the band's previous work, and has a unique sound, combining heavy metal with elements of hip-hop and reggae. This, along with the Christian lyrics, made it stand out from other nu metal albums, many of which had themes of misery, pain and sadness.

Satellite debuted at No. 6 on the Billboard 200 chart with over 133,000 copies sold. It spent five consecutive weeks in the top 10 of that chart, and went on to sell over three million copies in the U.S., and over seven million worldwide, making it the band's highest-selling album, and was placed at No. 137 on the Billboard's top 200 albums of the decade (2000–2009). It was the 117th best-selling album of 2001, and the 26th best-selling album of 2002 in the United States.

== Background and release ==
To promote Satellite, a sampler CD with the songs "Alive," "Boom," "Masterpiece Conspiracy," and "Set It Off" was released by Atlantic Records in 2001. In a 2001 interview with Billboard, drummer and backing vocalist Wuv Bernardo described the album as, "just more mature. Some of the music is slowed down a bit. There's more emotion going on." Four singles were released from the album, each with a music video; "Alive", "Youth of the Nation", "Boom", and title track, "Satellite". All four music videos were included on P.O.D.'s VHS/DVD Still Payin' Dues, released on November 12, 2002.

Satellite was certified triple platinum by the RIAA (Recording Industry Association of America) on August 26, 2002. "Alive" was nominated for the 2002 Grammy Award for Best Hard Rock Performance. Although not released as a single, "Portrait" was nominated for Best Metal Performance at the 2003 Grammy Awards. "Youth of the Nation" also earned a nomination in 2003 for "Best Hard Rock Performance". In July 2021, lead vocalist Sonny Sandoval, looking back on the said album, "with Satellite, we wanted to be more universal, and we wanted people to be able to listen, relate and interpret what they get out of it.

== Reissues ==
On July 29, 2002, a Limited Edition reissue of the album was announced. It includes a new front cover, three extra songs on the CD, and a bonus DVD containing video footage of four live songs and a behind the scenes video titled "Into the Satellite". Satellite: Limited Edition was released on August 27, 2002; only 100,000 copies were produced. A CD-exclusive reissue containing both Satellite and The Fundamental Elements of Southtown (1999), the band's third studio album, was released in Europe and South Africa on August 4, 2008. The reissue includes the bonus track "Whatever It Takes".

On June 9, 2021, a remaster of Satellite was announced for the album's 20th anniversary. The 20th Anniversary Expanded Edition includes a second CD with one dozen bonus tracks and remastered audio; it was released physically on CD and digitally on September 3, 2021. The bonus material on the remaster consists of the three extra songs from the 2002 Limited Edition CD, "Rock the Party (RTP Remix)", from the Japanese version of the original Satellite album, "Critic" and "Youth of the Nation (Mike$ki Remix)", both from the Australian and European "Satellite" single, the instrumental song "Sabbath", from The Warriors EP (1998), "School of Hard Knocks," and four previously unavailable demos, which include the songs "Armageddon," "Hold You Again," an alternate recording of "School of Hard Knocks" called "Don't Try to Play Me Out," and a demo recording of "Ridiculous".

A vinyl version of the remaster came out the following month on October 8, 2021. The vinyl reissue of Satellite does not include the extra songs from the CD and digital versions of the 20th Anniversary Expanded Edition. When discussing the inclusion of bonus content on the remastered version of Satellite, Sonny Sandoval stated during an interview in September 2021: "we had demos, we had all kinds of stuff, so we were like, okay. For that real fan that actually cares about that stuff, you know, let's, let's throw it in there and kind of do a double album, double disc."

== Critical reception ==
Professional ratings
Review scores
Source	Rating
AllMusic	4/5 stars
Cross Rhythms	(Original) (Reissue)
Entertainment.ie	4/5 stars
Entertainment Weekly	B+
Jesus Freak Hideout	4/5 stars
Los Angeles Times	3/4 stars
NME	3/5 stars
Rolling Stone	4/5 stars
The Whipping Post	8/10 stars

Jenny Eliscu of Rolling Stone praised the album for expanding past the usual boundaries of nu metal, adding it does so "without resorting to ham-fisted angst," but pushes all the right emotional buttons. Daryl McIntosh of Albumism said the album is "timely with both its distinctive sound and refreshingly positive message." He added "Satellite not only provided the much-needed musical encouragement, but also at times helped me recalibrate spiritually" and added "P.O.D.'s unique fusion of various musical genres provided a sound unlike any other at the time or since." Jason Birchmeier of AllMusic noted that Satellite is more optimistic than other heavy metal albums of the time, helped by Sonny's soaring vocals and a unique sound, combining metal with hip-hop and dub, as well as Rage Against the Machine influences. CMJ, in their October 1, 2001 issue, commented, "[its] honest spiritual subject matter coupled with crack-your-skull riffs work like a well-oiled machine."

In July 2010, HM Magazine ranked Satellite at number 2 on their "Top 100 Christian Rock Albums of all time" list, stating it "had perfect timing... and monster jams." In March 2018, Heaven's Metal Magazine ranked Satellite at number 18 on their "Top 100 Christian Metal Albums of all Time" list, and said "the band's greatness and power gelled on this release, mixing melody with punch." In March 2021, the album was put on their "Christian Metal Albums That Changed the Game" list, saying, "not only did Satellite sell ridiculously well, it was nominated for 3 Grammys in the Hard Rock and Metal categories."

In September 2014, Revolver put Satellite on its "10 Nu-Metal Albums You Need to Own" list. In January 2025, Loudwire ranked Satellite at number 28 on their list of "The Top 50 Nu-Metal Albums of All Time (Ranked)", describing it as "Filled with reggae influenced hooks" and saying the album "blew past the band's previous efforts". In 2021, the staff of Revolver included the album in their list of the "20 Essential Nu-Metal Albums", saying "P.O.D. exchanged the gnarlier hardcore of early albums like 1996's Brown for hook-heavy, reggae-infused rap-rock".

== Legacy ==
P.O.D. announced on their official YouTube channel a series of livestream concerts called "Satellite Over Southtown" on April 23, 2021, with the band performing Satellite live in its entirety on May 13, 2021. A tour for the album's 20th anniversary was announced on June 8, 2021. The tour, which included the bands All Good Things, From Ashes to New, and Sleep Signals as special guests, began August 14 and ended October 7, 2021. Bassist and backing vocalist Traa Daniels said about the significance of Satellite during an interview in February 2023: "you don't realize how much a difference you make until people come up to you and tell you that, you know, that record meant something to them."

A remixed version of "Set It Off" was featured on the soundtrack to the movie The Scorpion King in 2002. "Boom" was featured on the soundtrack to the movies Grind in 2003 and NASCAR 3D: The IMAX Experience in 2005; "The Crystal Method Remix" version of the song was featured on the soundtrack to the film Biker Boyz in 2003. "Youth of the Nation" was featured on the soundtrack to the film Adrenaline in 2003. A remixed version of "Satellite" was featured on the soundtrack to the movie Lara Croft: Tomb Raider – The Cradle of Life in 2003. "Alive," "Boom," and "Youth of the Nation" were released as downloadable content for the video game Rocksmith 2014 in 2019.

== Track listing ==
All tracks are written by Sonny Sandoval, Traa Daniels, Marcos Curiel, and Wuv Bernardo.

No.	Title	Length
1.	"Set It Off"	4:15
2.	"Alive^{[a]}"	3:23
3.	"Boom^{[a]}^{[b]}"	3:08
4.	"Youth of the Nation^{[a]}"	4:18
5.	"Celestial" (instrumental)	1:24
6.	"Satellite^{[a]}"	3:30
7.	"Ridiculous" (featuring Eek-a-Mouse)	4:17
8.	"The Messenjah"	4:18
9.	"Guitarras de Amor" (instrumental)	1:14
10.	"Anything Right" (featuring Christian Lindskog)	4:17
11.	"Ghetto"	3:37
12.	"Masterpiece Conspiracy"	3:11
13.	"Without Jah, Nothin" (featuring H.R.)	3:41
14.	"Thinking About Forever"	3:45
15.	"Portrait"	4:30
Total length:		52:57

^{a} Appears on Greatest Hits: The Atlantic Years compilation (2006)
^{b} Live recording appears on The Warriors EP, Volume 2 (2005)

European bonus track
No.	Title	Length
16.	"Whatever It Takes" (originally featured in the movie Any Given Sunday)	4:02

Japanese bonus track
No.	Title	Length
16.	"Rock the Party (RTP Remix)"	3:58

2002 Limited Edition CD bonus tracks
No.	Title	Length
16.	"Alive (Semi-Acoustic Version)"	3:25
17.	"Youth of the Nation (Conjure One Remix)"	3:55
18.	"Boom (The Crystal Method Remix)"	3:17

Limited Edition bonus DVD
No.	Title	Length
19.	"Set It Off" (live)	4:42
20.	"Without Jah, Nothin'" (live)	2:47
21.	"Youth of the Nation" (live)	4:18
22.	"Outkast" (live)	5:22
23.	"Into the Satellite" (behind-the-scenes documentary)	6:25

20th Anniversary Expanded Edition bonus tracks (Disc 2)
No.	Title	Length
1.	"Ridiculous" (2001 demo)	4:22
2.	"Hold You Again" (2001 demo)	4:11
3.	"Don't Try to Play Me Out" (2001 demo)	4:19
4.	"Armageddon" (2001 demo)	4:21
5.	"Critic"	2:43
6.	"Sabbath" (instrumental (previously released on The Warriors EP))	4:32
7.	"School of Hard Knocks" (originally featured in the film Little Nicky)	4:06
8.	"Alive (Semi-Acoustic Version)"	3:26
9.	"Rock the Party (RTP Remix)"	3:58
10.	"Youth of the Nation (Conjure One Remix)"	3:55
11.	"Youth of the Nation (Mike$ki Remix)"	4:07
12.	"Boom (The Crystal Method Remix)"	3:16
Total length:		47:21

== Personnel ==
Credits adapted from album liner notes.

P.O.D.
- Sonny Sandoval – lead vocals
- Marcos Curiel – guitar, backing vocals
- Traa Daniels – bass guitar, backing vocals
- Wuv Bernardo – drums, backing vocals

Additional musicians

- Jonnie Hall, D.J. Harper, Nils Montan, Healey Moore, Meagan Moore, Colin Sasaki, Laurie Schillinger, Ayanna Williams – children's choir (track 4)
- Eek-A-Mouse – additional vocals (track 7)
- Steve Russell – pre-production assistance (track 7), guitar tech
- Christian Lindskog – additional vocals (track 10)
- Joel Derouin – violin (track 10)
- Larry Corbett – cello (track 10)
- Suzy Katayama – string arrangement and conducting (track 10)
- H.R. – additional vocals (track 13)
- Andres Torres – guitar tech
- Gary Girsh – drum tech
- Howard Benson – keyboards and loops

Production

- Howard Benson – producer
- Martie Kolbl – project coordination
- Craig Rosen – project administration
- Chris Lord-Alge – mixing at Image Recording Studios (Los Angeles, California)
- Randy Staub – engineering
- Ted Jensen – mastering at Sterling Sound (Chelsea, New York)
- Eric Miller – assistant recording engineer
- Steve Kaplan, Matt Silva – assistant mix engineers
- Duane Barron – additional assistant engineer
- Bobby Brooks – additional assistant engineering, Pro Tools editing
- Jim Foster, Chris "Sleepy J" Vaughan-Jones – Pro Tools editing
- Jill Greenberg – photography
- Larry Freemantle, P.O.D. – art direction
- John Rubeli – A&R
- Bobbi Page – contractor (track 4)

2002 Limited Edition

- Sean Beavan – mixing (track 17)
- Rhys Fulber – programming, remix (track 17)
- Jamie Muhoberac – additional keyboards (track 17)
- The Crystal Method – additional production, remix (track 18)
- David Anthony, Gloria Gabriel – DVD producers
- ATV Film – production (live concert footage)
- Paul Hauptmann – director, producer (live concert footage)
- Steve Russell – audio mixing at Bay 7
- Jun Murakawa – assistant engineer
- Mic Thiemann – post-production
- Grünspan (Hamburg, Germany) – concert recording location (January 16, 2002)
- Devin DeHaven – producer, director (behind the scenes footage)
- Sandra Missakian, Ruben Torres – producers (behind the scenes footage)

20th Anniversary Expanded Edition

- Jason Jones – producer
- Kristen Attaway – project supervision
- Anthony Schiller – project assistance
- Liuba Shapiro Ruiz – product manager
- Allison Boron, Sheryl Farber – editorial
- Greg Allen – design (Omnivore Creative)
- P.O.D. – producer (disc two, track 6)
- Steve Russell – engineer, mixing (disc two, track 6)
- Gavin Lurssen – mastering at The Mastering Lab (disc two, track 6)
- Golden Track – recording location (San Diego, California) (disc two, track 6)
- Sean Beavan – mixing (disc two, track 10)
- Rhys Fulber – programming (disc two, track 10), remix (disc two, tracks 9–10)
- Jamie Muhoberac – additional keyboards (disc two, track 10)
- The Crystal Method – additional production, remix (disc two, track 12)
- Dan Hersh, Bill Inglot – remastering at D2 Mastering (Los Angeles, California)

== Charts ==
=== Weekly charts ===
Weekly chart performance for Satellite
Chart (2001–2003)	Peak position
Australian Albums (ARIA)	19
Austrian Albums (Ö3 Austria)	5
Belgian Albums (Ultratop Flanders)	13
Belgian Albums (Ultratop Wallonia)	32
Danish Albums (Hitlisten)	10
Dutch Albums (Album Top 100)	27
European Top 100 Albums (Music & Media)	8
Finnish Albums (Suomen virallinen lista)	10
French Albums (SNEP)	50
German Albums (Offizielle Top 100)	5
Hungarian Albums (MAHASZ)	14
Irish Albums (IRMA)	7
Italian Albums (FIMI)	18
New Zealand Albums (RMNZ)	4
Norwegian Albums (VG-lista)	7
Scottish Albums (Official Charts)	16
Swedish Albums (Sverigetopplistan)	8
Swiss Albums (Schweizer Hitparade)	11
UK Albums (Official Charts)	16
US Billboard 200	6
US Top Christian Albums (Billboard)	1

=== Year-end charts ===
2001 year-end chart performance for Satellite
Chart (2001)	Position
US Billboard 200	117

2002 year-end chart performance for Satellite
Chart (2002)	Position
Australian Albums (ARIA)	53
Austrian Albums (Ö3 Austria)	24
Belgian Albums (Ultratop Flanders)	57
Canadian Albums (Nielsen SoundScan)	90
Canadian Alternative Albums (Nielsen SoundScan)	27
Canadian Metal Albums (Nielsen SoundScan)	12
Danish Albums (Hitlisten)	56
Dutch Albums (Album Top 100)	97
Europe (European Top 100 Albums)	32
German Albums (Offizielle Top 100)	21
New Zealand Albums (RMNZ)	46
Swedish Albums (Sverigetopplistan)	43
Swiss Albums (Schweizer Hitparade)	82
US Billboard 200	26
Worldwide Albums (IFPI)	46

=== Decade-end charts ===
Decade-end chart performance for Satellite
Chart (2000–2009)	Position
US Billboard 200	137
US Christian Albums (Billboard)	1

== Certifications ==
Certifications and sales for Satellite
Region	Certification	Certified units/sales
Australia (ARIA)	Gold	35,000^{^}
Canada (Music Canada)	Platinum	100,000^{^}
Germany (BVMI)	Gold	150,000^{^}
New Zealand (RMNZ)	Gold	7,500^{^}
Sweden (GLF)	Gold	40,000^{^}
Switzerland (IFPI Switzerland)	Gold	20,000^{^}
United Kingdom (BPI)	Gold	100,000^{*}
United States (RIAA)	3× Platinum	3,000,000^{^}
^{*} Sales figures based on certification alone.^{^} Shipments figures based on certification alone.

== Awards ==
=== 2001 Grammy Awards ===
- Grammy Award for Best Hard Rock Performance for "Alive" (nominated)

=== 2002 MTV Video Music Awards ===
- Best Video of the Year for "Alive" (nominated)
- Best Group Video for "Alive" (nominated)
- Best Rock Video for "Youth of the Nation" (nominated)
- Best Direction for "Alive" (nominated)
- Best Special Effects for "Alive" (nominated)
- Viewer's Choice for "Alive" (nominated)

=== 2002 Grammy Awards ===
- Best Hard Rock Performance for "Youth of the Nation" (nomination)

=== 2002 Teen Choice Music Awards ===
- Choice Rock Track for "Youth of the Nation" (nomination)
- Choice Album for "Satellite" (nomination)

=== 2003 Dove Awards ===
- Hard Music Recorded Song of the Year for "Boom" (Won)
- Song of the Year for "Youth of the Nation" (nominated)

=== 2003 Echo Awards ===
- Echo Award for Best International Rock/Alternative Group for Satellite (won)

=== 2003 Grammy Awards ===
- Best Metal Performance for "Portrait" (nomination)
