= Alive (P.O.D. song) =

2001 single by P.O.D.

Single by P.O.D.

from the album Satellite
- B-side: "School of Hard Knocks"; "Lie Down" (demo); "Sabbath"
- Released: July 31, 2001
- Studio: Bay 7 (Valley Village, California); Sparky Dark (Calabasas, California)
- Genre: Nu metal; Christian metal; rap rock
- Length: 3:23
- Label: Atlantic
- Songwriters: Noah Bernardo; Marcos Curiel; Traa Daniels; Sonny Sandoval
- Producer: Howard Benson

P.O.D. singles chronology
"School of Hard Knocks" (2000)	"Alive" (2001)	"Youth of the Nation" (2001)

Music video
- "Alive" on YouTube

"Alive" is a song by American Christian metal band P.O.D. It was released on July 31, 2001, as the lead single from their fourth studio album, Satellite, and is one of the band's most popular songs. The "Alive" CD single was first released in 2001 and then again in 2002 with alternative cover art and tracks. A semi-acoustic remix was included as a bonus track on the special edition re-release of Satellite available August 27, 2002. In December 2017, "Alive" was ranked at No. 7 on "The 10 best P.O.D. songs" list by Metal Hammer.

== Background ==
The lyrics to the track were written by vocalist Sonny Sandoval and were inspired by a moment when he recognized his own features in those of his young daughter for the first time.

The song debuted just prior to the September 11, 2001, attacks and benefited by offering a positive message during hard times. As such, "Alive" went on to become one of MTV's and MTV2's most played videos of 2001 and became a huge pop hit. Guitarist Marcos Curiel mentioned the song's relevance in a 2008 interview: "There's just way too much negativity going on in our everyday lives. When you can hear something that's going to uplift you like 'Alive' or something that's going to bring out knowledge like 'Youth of the Nation,' we've done our jobs as an artist. We're trying to be relevant with the people."

Sonny Sandoval stated, "We didn't have a name for it, but we were calling it 'Beautiful' because it made us feel beautiful. And that drove the direction of the lyrical content, because we wanted people to go, 'Hey, this makes me feel good.' We recorded the chorus I don't know how many times, because it was like, 'Let's take it up a notch. Let's take it higher.'"

== Music video ==
Directed by Francis Lawrence with special effects by Pixel Envy, the "Alive" video made its television debut on August 20, 2001. It boasts a massive car wreck filmed under a freeway intersection in the San Fernando Valley in mid-2001. Lawrence had conceived the idea years prior but was unsuccessful in pitching it to bands. Upon filming "Alive," Lawrence stated "I'm so glad I didn't get those jobs, because this was so perfect." His idea developed further upon shooting the video by focusing on a wild day in the life of a teenager. Lawrence elaborate:

"I've done emotional videos before, but having kid stuff like – surfing, skating, making out – plus the visual punch of the car accident. It packs it all."

Lawrence also modified scenes from his original concept; the boy is shown emerging from the demolished car unscathed rather than not appearing at all, and he makes out with his girlfriend in a train tunnel rather than implying sex in a bedroom as Lawrence previously envisioned. All of the effects and work behind "Alive" were detailed in a retrospective MTV article in August 2002.

"Alive" was nominated for five awards at the 2002 MTV Video Music Awards ceremony, making it one of the most nominated videos of the year. The video won "Best Rock Video" at the 2002 Music Video Production Association (MVPA) Awards. "Alive" was also ranked second on TVU's 50 Best Videos of All Time list.

== Performances ==
When the song became the most requested video on TRL in September 2001, rather than simply having the video aired, P.O.D. performed a live, hour-long set at Battery Park. This was despite Sandoval battling a severe cold. The song was performed on The Tonight Show with Jay Leno on October 5, 2001. It was originally planned for the prior month but rescheduled due to the September 11 attacks. Not including encores, "Alive" typically ends P.O.D.'s concert setlist.

== Awards ==
2001 San Diego Music Awards

- Song of the Year

2002 Grammy Awards

- Best Hard Rock Performance (nomination)

2002 MTV Video Music Awards

- Video of the Year (nomination)
- Best Group Video (nomination)
- Best Direction in a Video – Francis Lawrence (nomination)
- Best Special Effects in a Video – Pixel Envy (nomination)
- Viewer's Choice (nomination)

2002 MVPA Awards

- Rock Video of the Year

== Track listings ==
UK CD single

1. "Alive" (album version) – 3:22
2. "School of Hard Knocks" – 4:04
3. "Lie Down" (demo) – 4:20
4. "Alive" (enhanced video)

UK cassette single

1. "Alive" (album version) – 3:22
2. "School of Hard Knocks" – 4:04
3. "Lie Down" (demo) – 4:20

European CD single

1. "Alive" (album version)
2. "School of Hard Knocks"

Australian CD single

1. "Alive" (album version)
2. "Lie Down" (demo)
3. "Sabbath"

== Charts ==
=== Weekly charts ===
Chart (2001–2002)	Peak position
Australia (ARIA)	18
Austria (Ö3 Austria Top 40)	11
Belgium (Ultratop 50 Flanders)	40
Denmark (Tracklisten)	7
Europe (Eurochart Hot 100)	27
Finland (Suomen virallinen lista)	9
Germany (GfK)	16
Ireland (IRMA)	15
Netherlands (Dutch Top 40)	37
Netherlands (Single Top 100)	41
New Zealand (Recorded Music NZ)	42
Norway (VG-lista)	14
Scotland Singles (OCC)	16
Sweden (Sverigetopplistan)	12
Switzerland (Schweizer Hitparade)	51
UK Singles (OCC)	19
UK Rock & Metal (OCC)	1
US Billboard Hot 100	41
US Mainstream Rock Tracks (Billboard)	4
US Modern Rock Tracks (Billboard)	2

=== Year-end charts ===
Chart (2001)	Position
US Mainstream Rock Tracks (Billboard)	38
US Modern Rock Tracks (Billboard)	36

Chart (2002)	Position
Australia (ARIA)	96
Sweden (Hitlistan)	65
US Modern Rock Tracks (Billboard)	32

== Certifications ==
Region	Certification	Certified units/sales
New Zealand (RMNZ)	Gold	15,000^{‡}
^{‡} Sales+streaming figures based on certification alone.

== Release history ==
Region	Date	Format(s)	Label(s)	Ref.
United States	July 31, 2001	Mainstream rock; active rock; alternative radio	Atlantic	
Australia	October 22, 2001	CD	Atlantic	
United Kingdom	January 21, 2002	CD; cassette	Atlantic	

== Appearances in media ==
"Alive" was included in the 2013 video game Rocksmith 2014 as downloadable content in the "P.O.D. Song Pack" on May 14, 2019.
