= Reveille (band) =

American nu metal band

Background information
- Origin: Massachusetts, U.S.
- Genres: Nu metal; rap metal
- Years active: 1997–2003, 2008
- Label: Elektra
- Past members: Drew Simollardes; Steve Miloszewsk; Greg Sullivan; Chris Turner; Carl Randolph; Justin Wilson

Reveille was an American nu metal/rap metal band from Harvard, Chelmsford, and Shirley, Massachusetts. They released two studio albums, Laced in 1999 and Bleed the Sky in 2001.

== History ==
=== Formation and major label years (1997–2003) ===
The band initially formed in 1997. That year, they recorded a six-track demo that attracted the attention of major labels. After a standout performance at the famous CBGB in Manhattan, New York Reveille signed with Warner Music Group's Elektra Records. They gained nationwide exposure with their debut album, Laced, in 1999. The album featured a guest appearance by Cypress Hill rapper B-Real. The band played Warped Tour 1999, Woodstock 1999, and Ozzfest 2000, and toured with Godsmack, Machine Head, and Powerman 5000.

Reveille's follow-up album, Bleed the Sky was released in 2001. The album featured appearances from Taproot singer Stephen Richards and Cold singer Scooter Ward; the collaboration for which Reveille achieved Billboard success with their song "Inside Out (Can You Feel Me Now)". Also, the group won the "Rising Star" award from the Boston Music Awards in 2001, and then embarked on a tour with Static-X. The following year Bleed the Sky was nominated for Boston Music Award's "Album of the Year".

In 2002, their original guitarist, Greg Sullivan, decided to leave the band citing "creative differences". He was replaced by Chris Turner. Though initially announcing the band would be releasing a third album through Elektra Records, once again enlisting the help of producer Howard Benson, this album never saw release and they soon departed the label. Singer Drew Simollardes claimed Reveille had been pressured to make more accessible radio-oriented music by the label, stating "Our biggest problem was always battling with people at the label. They were kind of trying to market us to 12 year old girls and it didn't work. That was our big problem with them." Reveille did one tour with Sevendust before breaking up in 2003. Their final show was the "3rd Annual Hometown Throwdown" at the Palladium in Worcester, Massachusetts, on December 28, 2002, where they performed two live new songs titled "Your Life" & "Nothing To No One" that was originally supposed to be for their third album.

=== "Reveille Reborn" reunion (2008) ===
On October 20, 2008, it was announced that Reveille would be reuniting for one night in Worcester, Massachusetts, for a show dubbed "Reveille Reborn". Asked about Reveille's reunion in an interview with the Worcester Telegram from December 2008, Simollardes replied:

The biggest reward will be seeing the fans again. We aren't promoting a new album or a new tour, so this isn't about making money or furthering our future as a band. When we broke up, we simply vanished without a trace. This is our chance to pay homage to the couple hundred thousand people who bought our records and believed in what we did. The show itself will be the reward for us … experiencing that personal interaction with our fans.

— Drew Simollardes, Worcester Telegram, December 26, 2008

The concert took place December 26, 2008, with opening bands Nullset, Debris, CrowneVict and ((breathe)). The venue was sold out with over 2,000 people in attendance. Future plans for Reveille are unknown at this point.

== Members ==
- Drew Simollardes – vocals (1997–2003, 2008)
- Greg Sullivan – guitar (1997–2002, 2008)
- Steve Miloszewski – guitar (1997–2003, 2008)
- Carl Randolph – bass (1997–2003, 2008)
- Justin Wilson – drums (1997–2003, 2008)
- Chris Turner – guitar (2002–2003)

== Discography ==
=== Albums ===
- Laced (1999)
- Bleed the Sky (2001)

=== Other albums ===
• Demo (EP) (1997)

- Reveille (EP) (1998)
- Signal for Wakening (EP) (1999)

=== Other appearances ===
- Reveille songs "The Phoenix" and "Untied" were featured in a 2007 commercial for World of Warcraft, starring actor Verne Troyer.
- "What You Got" is featured in EA Sports MMA.

== Other projects ==
- Bassist Carl Randolph briefly joined the alternative rock band Oma in 2003.
- Guitarist Steve Miloszewski was a member of the band City Sleeps from 2005 to 2008.
- Chris Turner is now in a band known as Vera Mesmer with two releases: "The Gypsy Magician [EP]" (2007) and "Orphans – EP" (2012).
- Greg Sullivan has his band called "Truth ending cycle" with two releases: "Motion" (2004) and "The Obvious" (2010)
- Singer Drew Simollardes and original Reveille guitarist Greg Sullivan formed a new band called Genuflect with the old member of 7th rail crew in 2005. The band released two albums : "The End of the World" (2007) and "The Shadow Side" (2009) and broke up in 2011. The band reunited recently with a new line-up and released their latest album "A Rose From The Dead" (2014).
- Drummer Justin Wilson played in "Drum Hall" and is now in the band "Sleep alive" as well as an accomplished GB musician
- Greg Sullivan, Jeff Lawn & Tim Munroe are part of the band "Shadow Therapy" (2012)
