= The Warriors EP =

EP by P.O.D.
- Released: November 17, 1998
- Genre: Nu metal; rap metal
- Length: 27:35
- Label: Tooth & Nail
- Producer: P.O.D.

P.O.D. chronology
| Payable on Death Live (1997) | The Warriors EP (1998) | The Fundamental Elements of Southtown (1999) |

Professional ratings
Review scores
| Source | Rating |
|---|---|
| AllMusic | 3/5 stars |

The Warriors EP is an EP by American Christian nu metal band P.O.D. It was released on November 17, 1998, as a transitional album from Rescue Records to Atlantic Records. The EP contains a message from lead singer Sonny Sandoval thanking the 'warriors', P.O.D.'s following of fans, for supporting them throughout the years before signing with Atlantic Records. Though produced by Atlantic Records, the album was actually released by Tooth & Nail Records. The entire EP is made to sound like the songs are being played through a phonograph, being mixed with a faux vinyl crackling throughout each song.

== Track listing ==
| No. | Title | Originally/later appeared on | Length |
|---|---|---|---|
| 1. | "Intro" | – | 1:37 |
| 2. | "Southtown" | The Fundamental Elements of Southtown (1999) | 4:30 |
| 3. | "Breathe Babylon^{1}" | Brown (1996) | 6:02 |
| 4. | "Rosa Linda" | – | 1:42 |
| 5. | "Draw the Line^{1}" | Snuff the Punk (1994) | 3:14 |
| 6. | "Full Color^{1}" | Brown (1996) | 5:53 |
| 7. | "Sabbath" (instrumental) | Satellite: 20th Anniversary Expanded Edition (2021) | 4:33 |
| Total length: | | | 27:35 |

== Personnel ==
Credits adapted from the EP's liner notes.

P.O.D.

- Sonny Sandoval – vocals
- Marcos Curiel – lead guitar
- Traa Daniels – bass guitar
- Wuv Bernardo – drums

Additional musician

- Sharon Whyte – accordion

Production

- P.O.D. – producer
- Steve Rusell – engineer, mixing at Golden Track Studios (San Diego, California)
- Gavin Lurssen – mastering at The Mastering Lab (Hollywood, California)

Additional personnel

- Suzy Hutchinson – CD layout
- Matt Wingall – band photos

== Notes ==
^{1.} Re-recorded material.
