= Youth of the Nation =

Single by P.O.D.

from the album Satellite
- B-side: "Alive" (semi-acoustic version); "Sabbath"
- Released: November 27, 2001
- Genre: Alternative rock; Christian metal; rap rock; nu metal
- Length: 4:17
- Label: Atlantic
- Songwriters: Noah Bernardo; Marcos Curiel; Traa Daniels; Sonny Sandoval
- Producer: Howard Benson

P.O.D. singles chronology
"Alive" (2001)	"Youth of the Nation" (2001)	"Boom" (2002)

Music video
- "Youth of the Nation" on YouTube

"Youth of the Nation" is a song by American Christian nu metal band P.O.D. released on November 27, 2001, as the second single from their fourth studio album, Satellite (2001). It was inspired in part by the school shootings at Santana High School in 2001 and Columbine High School in 1999. The song became the band's only No. 1 hit on the US Billboard Modern Rock Tracks chart and reached No. 28 on the Billboard Hot 100, their only single to reach the top 40. It was ranked at number one on Classic Rock's list of "The 10 best P.O.D. songs" on December 20, 2017.

== Background ==
The song's inspiration stems from a trip when the band was on their way to record for Satellite on March 5, 2001. They were held up in traffic and discovered that the reason was a mass shooting at Santana High School, where a fifteen-year-old student named Charles Andrew Williams killed two and wounded thirteen. The album was consequently delayed, and the band was inspired to write "Youth of the Nation."

In a 2008 interview, guitarist Marcos Curiel described the event:

"We were rehearsing and writing Satellite a couple of blocks away from the school. One day on the way to the studio, there were all these helicopters and cars speeding by. We really didn't know what was going on. When we got to the studio, this guy had the news on, and he was like, 'This kid just went and started blasting fools.' So we started jamming, and that rhythm just naturally came out, then Wuv [Bernardo, drummer] put that drumbeat on it, and the song was born."

Curiel added, "When you can hear something that's going to uplift you like 'Alive' or something that's going to bring out knowledge like 'Youth of the Nation,' we've done our jobs as an artist."

== Lyrics and song structure ==
"Youth of the Nation" contains three stories of adolescent tragedy in American culture. It begins by describing a teenager skating to school only to be shot by a fellow student. Lyrics go on to speculate whether or not the boy who committed the act felt unloved. Following the chorus, a 12-year-old girl called "little Suzie" is depicted as having been abandoned by her father and subsequently "finding love in all the wrong places." Finally, another teen known as "Johnny boy" fails to fit in with his peers and ultimately commits suicide by firearm, "[telling] the world how he felt with the sound of a gat [handgun]."

== Music video ==
The music video for "Youth of the Nation" has the band performing the song in a room filled with photos of adolescents as seen on the single cover. It revolves around a group of teenagers taking a cross country trip in a car from New York City to Venice Beach in Los Angeles via Western Pennsylvania (New Kensington, Arnold, Cheswick, Harmarville), Carhenge is used as a backdrop for parts of the chorus along with other locales. The book On the Road by Jack Kerouac can be seen on the dashboard of the car. Directed by Paul Fedor, the video found significant airplay on MTV2.

The video features a prefamous Joel David Moore as the teenager driving the car.

Marcos Curiel noted that censorship of the video came into play due to Viacom: "We had a girl sitting on the hood of the car going down the highway trying to be free-spirited, you know? [...] But, Viacom and MTV had us edit that out because kids are so easily influenced."

== Awards ==
2003 Grammy Awards

- Best Hard Rock Performance (nomination)

2002 MTV Video Music Awards

- Best Rock Video (nomination)

== Track listing ==
UK, European, and Australian CD single

1. "Youth of the Nation" (album version) – 4:17
2. "Alive" (semi-acoustic version) – 3:23
3. "Sabbath" – 4:32

== Charts ==
=== Weekly charts ===
Chart (2002)	Peak position
Australia (ARIA)	17
Austria (Ö3 Austria Top 40)	11
Belgium (Ultratop 50 Flanders)	47
Canada (BDS)	20
Denmark (Tracklisten)	10
Europe (Eurochart Hot 100)	16
Finland (Suomen virallinen lista)	15
France (SNEP)	72
Germany (GfK)	5
Hungary (Single Top 40)	16
Ireland (IRMA)	20
Italy (FIMI)	13
Netherlands (Dutch Top 40)	27
Netherlands (Single Top 100)	34
Norway (VG-lista)	5
Scotland Singles (OCC)	35
Sweden (Sverigetopplistan)	7
Switzerland (Schweizer Hitparade)	16
UK Singles (OCC)	36
UK Rock & Metal (OCC)	3
US Billboard Hot 100	28
US Mainstream Rock Tracks (Billboard)	6
US Mainstream Top 40 (Billboard)	18
US Modern Rock Tracks (Billboard)	1

=== Year-end charts ===
Chart (2002)	Position
Canada Radio (Nielsen BDS)	86
Germany (Media Control)	56
Sweden (Hitlistan)	51
US Mainstream Rock Tracks (Billboard)	20
US Mainstream Top 40 (Billboard)	90
US Modern Rock Tracks (Billboard)	10

== Certifications ==
Region	Certification	Certified units/sales
Australia (ARIA)	Gold	35,000^{^}
Germany (BVMI)	Gold	300,000^{‡}
New Zealand (RMNZ)	Platinum	30,000^{‡}
^{^} Shipments figures based on certification alone.^{‡} Sales+streaming figures based on certification alone.

== Release history ==
Region	Date	Format(s)	Label(s)	Ref.
United States	November 27, 2001	Mainstream rock; active rock; alternative radio	Atlantic	
United States	February 11, 2002	Contemporary hit radio	Atlantic	
Australia	March 11, 2002	CD	Atlantic	
United Kingdom	May 6, 2002	CD; cassette	Atlantic	
