= Bleed the Sky (album) =

Studio album by Reveille
- Released: September 18, 2001
- Recorded: 2001
- Genre: Nu metal, rap metal
- Label: Elektra
- Producer: Howard Benson

Reveille chronology
Laced (1999)	Bleed the Sky (2001)

Singles from Bleed the Sky
- 1. "Bleed the Sky" Released: August 26, 2001; 2. "Inside Out" Released: October 17, 2001; 3. "What You Got" Released: November 11, 2001

Professional ratings
Review scores
Source	Rating
AllMusic	2/5 stars
melodic.net	3.5/5 stars
Sputnikmusic	4/5 stars

Bleed the Sky is the second and final album released by the nu metal band Reveille from Harvard, Massachusetts. It was originally released on September 18, 2001, through Elektra Records.

The album's initial 2001 release featured 13 tracks with the track "What You Got" being the first single. In the 2002 re-release a bonus track was added; a remixed version of "Inside Out" which went on to be the second single of this album.

== Background and music ==
In a September 19, 2001 interview, drummer Justin Wilson claimed the band's intention was to create an album with no filler. Wilson said this led to Bleed the Sky having more melody than their previous album Laced, but he still considered it to also be "heavier than ever at times". The artwork features an orange bleeding juice while being picked apart with medical forceps.

A portion of the opening track "Unborn" was censored by Elektra Records. During the album session, there was an intro for the song "Unborn", however, it didn't make the final version. "Down to None" is the shortest track on the album, and was written in the style of a straightforward hip hop song, with no guitars. The single "What You Got" was originally written for their Elektra debut Laced. In a September 19, 2001 interview, singer Drew Simollardes described "What You Got" as a "sarcastic hip-hoppy mosh pit song". The song "Comin' Back" has the lyric "life is what you make it, don't let time take it", which was inspired by a woman Simollardes was dating who got in a car accident. He said on September 19, 2001, "that's really the way I feel. I've been dating a girl who was in a bad car wreck, where the car flipped over, and her friend died in it. We recently got engaged. You never know what's going to happen, so enjoy life while you've got it."

The tracks "Catarax" and "Plastic" feature guest vocals from Taproot singer Stephen Richards. "Plastic" also features singer Aimee Mann, who was a labelmate at Elektra. The members of Reveille became friends with Taproot after playing with them at the 2000 edition of Ozzfest.

== Release and promotion ==
"What You Got" was released as a single in November 2001, and received a music video. It appeared on the 2002 East West Records compilation album Noize 2, while that year, the remixed version of "Inside Out" appeared on the Warner Music compilations The Trip 9 and Spring Madness. On streaming services, Bleed the Sky is listed as being copyrighted to Reveille themselves, unlike Laced which is listed as being copyrighted to Elektra/Warner Music, suggesting that the band possibly control the rights to this album but not Laced.

== Reception ==
In his review, AllMusic's Tom Semioli compared Simollardes to rapper Eminem, and described the album's music as a "relentless brick wall of sound". He wrote that "Bleed the Sky is all about loud guitars and permutations of pentatonic riffs that have kept hard rockers in ecstasy since Black Sabbath botched a few simple blues licks and changed the face of rock music" adding that it is "an album that will please genre fans without fail." Steve Morse of The Boston Globe wrote on September 19, 2001 that Bleed the Sky is a "bruising effort filled with slamming metal-rap." Matthew Sieglar of The Michigan Daily gave the album a C− rating on October 9, 2001. Sieglar considered it to be more musically diverse than Laced and better produced, but criticized the lyrics for being "childish". He noted that it was released at an opportune time, as "popular music seems to be shifting from teen pop to trash rock", adding that "the best way to describe Reveille is a harder version of Limp Bizkit [or] as they like to label their style of music, rapcore."

== Track listing ==
No.	Title	Length
1.	"Unborn"	4:37
2.	"What You Got"	2:26
3.	"Look at Me Now"	3:29
4.	"Modified Lie"	4:37
5.	"Comin Back"	3:37
6.	"Killing Me"	4:13
7.	"Bleed the Sky"	5:53
8.	"Inside Out"	3:28
9.	"Catarax"	4:04
10.	"Down to None"	1:53
11.	"Derelict"	2:49
12.	"Plastic" (featuring Stephen Richards & Aimee Allen)	6:02
13.	"Farewell Fix" (featuring Aimee Allen (includes hidden track of Reveille, 7th Rail Crew and Nullset members freestyling; sometimes referred to as "Hope Wears Away"))	15:06

== Re-release track listing (2002) ==
No.	Title	Length
1.	"Unborn"	4:37
2.	"What You Got"	2:26
3.	"Look at Me Now"	3:29
4.	"Modified Lie"	4:37
5.	"Comin Back"	3:37
6.	"Killing Me"	4:13
7.	"Bleed the Sky"	5:53
8.	"Inside Out"	3:28
9.	"Catarax"	4:04
10.	"Down to None"	1:53
11.	"Derelict"	2:49
12.	"Plastic" (feat. Stephen Richards of Taproot)	6:02
13.	"Farewell Fix"	4:08
14.	"Inside Out (Can You Feel Me Now) (Remix)" (feat. Scooter Ward of Cold. Includes hidden track of Reveille, 7th Rail Crew and Gangsta Bitch Barbie (Nullset) members freestyling; sometimes referred to as "Hope Wears Away")	14:04

== Personnel ==
- Drew Simollardes – Vocals
- Steve Miloszewski – Guitar, Programming
- Greg Sullivan – Guitar, Backing Vocals
- Carl Randolph – Bass
- Justin Wilson – Drums
- Howard Benson – Additional Programming
- Stephen Richards – Vocals (12)
- Scooter Ward – Vocals (14)
- Aimee Allen – Backing Vocals (12, 13)
- Mixed by Mike Plotnikoff (1, 3-14)
- Mixed by Chris Lord-Alge (2)
- Engineered by Mike Plotnikoff
- Engineered by Bobby Brooks
- Additional Engineering by John Ship
- Assistant Engineers: Sam Storey, Ernie Vigil, Jeff Thomas
