= Little Nicky =

2000 film by Steven Brill

- Theatrical release poster
- Directed by: Steven Brill
- Written by: Tim Herlihy; Adam Sandler; Steven Brill
- Produced by: Robert Simonds; Jack Giarraputo
- Starring: Adam Sandler; Patricia Arquette; Harvey Keitel; Rhys Ifans; Tommy Lister Jr.; Rodney Dangerfield
- Cinematography: Theo van de Sande
- Edited by: Jeff Gourson
- Music by: Teddy Castellucci
- Production companies: Happy Madison Productions; RSC Media
- Distributed by: New Line Cinema
- Release date: November 10, 2000
- Running time: 90 minutes
- Country: United States
- Language: English
- Budget: $80—85 million
- Box office: $58 million

Little Nicky is a 2000 American dark fantasy comedy film directed by Steven Brill, written by Tim Herlihy, Adam Sandler, and Brill, and starring Sandler in the title role, Patricia Arquette, Harvey Keitel, Tommy "Tiny" Lister Jr., Rhys Ifans, and Rodney Dangerfield with supporting roles by Allen Covert, Kevin Nealon, Jon Lovitz, Michael McKean, and Quentin Tarantino. The film depicts the son of Satan and an angel who is tasked with returning his two brothers to Hell and preventing them from destroying the boundary between good and evil on Earth. Little Nicky was released by New Line Cinema on November 10, 2000. The film received negative reviews from critics and was a box office bomb, grossing $58 million against an $80–85 million budget.

== Plot ==
With his 10,000-year reign coming to an end, Satan must decide which of his three sons will succeed him as ruler of Hell. Adrian is the most devious, Cassius is the cruelest and Nicky is the kindest. Nicky has had a speech impediment and a disfigured jaw since Cassius hit him in the face with a shovel. Satan assembles his sons to tell them that as they are not yet ready to succeed him, he will continue ruling Hell.

Angered by this decision, Adrian and Cassius travel to Earth to create a new Hell by possessing religious and political leaders in New York City. As they leave, they freeze the entrance to Hell, preventing more evil souls from entering and causing Satan to begin to disintegrate. Stanley the Gatekeeper informs Satan of this and Satan punishes him by growing breasts on his head and giving him to his father Lucifer. Now too weak to stop Adrian and Cassius, he sends Nicky to Earth with a silver flask that traps whoever drinks from it inside.

Nicky has difficulty surviving on Earth and is killed several times, landing in Hell and returning to New York each time. While learning how to eat and sleep, he meets a possessed talking bulldog named Mr. Beefy, rents an apartment with an actor named Todd and falls in love with a design student named Valerie. Nicky encounters Adrian but fails to capture him and scares Valerie away. Nicky then observes Cassius on television possessing the referee of a Harlem Globetrotters game. Nicky arrives at the game and successfully tricks Cassius into the flask. Satanist metalheads John and Peter swear loyalty to Nicky. That evening, Nicky apologizes to Valerie and they begin a relationship after he reveals who he is and why he's on Earth.

The following day, Adrian possesses the Chief of the New York City Police Department and accuses Nicky of mass murder. Nicky has Todd kill him so he can go back to Hell and ask his father for advice. However, Satan has trouble hearing because his ears have fallen off, and his assistants are panicking because the deadline to capture Adrian and Cassius is approaching.

Back on Earth, Nicky and his friends devise a plan to capture Adrian in a subway station. Adrian discovers their trick and in the ensuing fight, he grabs Valerie and dives onto the track as a train approaches, but Nicky throws her aside, leaving himself and Adrian to be killed by the train.

Arriving in Hell just minutes before midnight, Adrian begins taking over Hell by pushing what remains of his father aside, sitting on the throne, rising to Central Park, and starting a riotous party. Meanwhile, Nicky wakes up in Heaven as a reward for sacrificing himself and meets his mother Holly, an angel who tells him that he can defeat Adrian with the "inner light" that he inherited from her.

After she gives him a mysterious orb, he confronts Adrian in Central Park. Adrian appears to win the battle by transforming into a bat and locking Nicky in the flask. However, Nicky escapes from the flask and shatters the orb, causing Ozzy Osbourne to appear, bite off Adrian's head, and spit it into the flask.

With his brothers captured, Nicky prepares to save his father. He and Valerie express their love for each other and she kills him. In Hell, Satan regains his body and suggests Nicky stay with Valerie to maintain things in the middle while stating to Holly that he still loves her. In the presence of Nicky and Satan, Lucifer shoves the flask containing Adrian and Cassius up Adolf Hitler's rump.

One year later, Nicky and Valerie live in New York with their infant son named Zachariah who has demonic powers.

A postscript revealed what happened to everyone:

- Valerie accidentally struck Nicky with a shovel which fixed his jaw disfigurement, believing that he is "still no George Clooney".
- Zachariah was suspended from nursery school after turning another kid's bottle of milk into moose urine.
- Todd started his one-man show on Broadway which only a transvestite named Andrew/Nipples who attended Adrian's riotous party attended.
- Mr. Beefy reunited with his rat girlfriend Heather where they got married last April and had five kids.
- Stanley the Gatekeeper and Gary the Monster also had kids of their own.
- Satan and Holly have been unable to deal with their long-distance relationship after dating for a while. Satan has been romantically linked to both the Blair Witch and Cher. Holly immediately fell in love with her new aerobics instructor Chris Farley.
- Using their $25,000,000.00 reward money, John and Peter purchased Led Zeppelin's old touring airplane, stocked it with cake, beer and great tunes, died in a plane crash soon after takeoff due to a lack of a pilot, and ended up happily in Hell as honored residents who have been given Nicky's old bedroom to party in.

== Cast ==
- Adam Sandler as Nicky Schear, the youngest son of Satan and an angel named Holly.
- Patricia Arquette as Valerie Veran, a design student who Nicky falls for.
- Harvey Keitel as Satan Schear, the ruler of Hell, the father of Nicky, Adrian, and Cassius.
- Rhys Ifans as Adrian Schear, the devious first son of Satan.
- Tommy "Tiny" Lister Jr. as Cassius Schear, the brutish second son of Satan.
- Allen Covert as Todd, a failed actor who takes Nicky in as a roommate.
- Robert Smigel as the voice of Mr. Beefy, a possessed bulldog and an old friend of Satan that Nicky befriends.
- Peter Dante as Peter, a Satanist metalhead and friend of John who befriends Nicky.
- Jonathan Loughran as John, a Satanist metalhead and friend of Peter who befriends Nicky.
- Rodney Dangerfield as Lucifer Schear, Nicky, Adrian, and Cassius's paternal grandfather and Satan's father who created Hell.
- Kevin Nealon as Stanley "Tit-Head", the Gatekeeper of Hell, whose namesake originates from Satan manifesting breasts on top of his head as punishment for failing to stop Adrian and Cassius from leaving Hell.
- Blake Clark as Jimmy, a demon who is one of Satan's advisors.
- Reese Witherspoon as Holly Schear, Nicky's angel mother.
- Quentin Tarantino as a blind deacon who senses Nicky's presence as a sign of the apocalypse.
- Jon Lovitz as The Peeper, a pervert who gets caught spying on Mrs. Dunleavy from a tree. He is killed by Scotty after he slingshots a rock at him, condemning to Hell where he is chased by giant horny birds.
- Michael McKean as the unnamed Chief of Police whom Adrian possesses.
- John Witherspoon as a Street Vendor who briefly steals Nicky's flask.
- Lewis Arquette as a cardinal
- Dana Carvey as Whitey Duvall, the referee. Character credited as "Referee".
- Ellen Cleghorne as a mother at the Globetrotters Game
- John Farley as a Human Dartboard
- Clint Howard as Andrew/Nipples, a transvestite that attended Adrian's riotous party in Central Park
- Leah Lail as Christa
- Dan Marino as himself, he tries to sell his soul to Satan in exchange for a Super Bowl victory, only to be declined when Satan considers himself too good to claim his soul.
- Ozzy Osbourne as himself, he is summoned by Nicky to bite the head off of Adrian's bat form.
- Regis Philbin as himself
- Rob Schneider as a Townie who attends Adrian's riotous party in Central Park and witnesses Nicky's fight with Adrian. Schneider reprises his role from The Waterboy.
- Frank Sivero as an Alumni Hall Announcer
- Jackie Titone as Jenna
- George Wallace as Mayor Randolph, the Mayor of New York City that Cassius possesses.
- Bill Walton as himself
- Carl Weathers as Derick "Chubbs" Peterson, a former pro-golfer who is now a dance instructor in Heaven. Weathers reprises his role from Happy Gilmore where his accidental death occurred.
- Henry Winkler as himself, he gets covered by bees twice in Central Park with the first one caused by Adrian and the second one caused by Nicky.
- Laura Harring as Mrs. Veronique Dunleavy, a woman who is spied upon by the Peeper
- Isaiah Griffin as Scotty Dunleavy, the son of Mrs. Dunleavy.
- Christopher Carroll as Adolf Hitler, head of the Nazi Party, who is condemned to Hell, dressed as a French maid, and routinely has large pineapples forced into his anus by Satan
- Joseph S. Griffo as an Evil Little Person
- Michael Deak as Gary the Monster
  - Jess Harnell as the vocal effects of Gary the Monster
- Fred Wolf as a Harlem Globetrotters fan.
- Radio Man as himself (deleted scene)

== Reception ==
=== Box office ===
It opened at #2 at the North American box office making $16 million in its opening weekend, behind Charlie's Angels, which was on its second consecutive week at the top spot. The film went on to earn $39.5 million domestically and another $18.8 million worldwide, bringing the total to $58 million.

=== Critical response ===
On the review aggregator website Rotten Tomatoes, 22% of 114 critics' reviews are positive. The website's consensus reads: "Despite the presence of a large, talented cast, the jokes in Little Nicky are dumb, tasteless, and not that funny, and Adam Sandler's character is grating to watch." Metacritic, which uses a weighted average, assigned the film a score of 38 out of 100, based on 29 critics, indicating "generally unfavorable" reviews. Audiences polled by CinemaScore gave the film a grade "B−" on a scale of A to F.

Comedian and former Mystery Science Theater 3000 host Michael J. Nelson named the film the worst comedy ever made. Roger Ebert of the Chicago Sun-Times gave the film a score of two-and-a-half stars out of four, describing Little Nicky as "the best Sandler movie to date" and the Nicky character as "intriguing", while at the same time lamenting Sandler's lack of finesse and vocal quirks.

In 2020, Evan Saathoff of /Film argued against the characterization of Little Nicky as being "a blight on [Sandler's] filmography", writing that Sandler "certainly never got this wild again, not in one of his own films at least."

=== Accolades ===
The film was nominated for five awards at the 21st Golden Raspberry Awards, including Worst Picture, Worst Actor (Adam Sandler), Worst Supporting Actress (Patricia Arquette), Worst Director and Worst Screenplay. It lost in all categories to Battlefield Earth starring John Travolta. At the 2000 Stinkers Bad Movie Awards, the film received seven total nominations: Worst Picture (lost to Battlefield Earth), Worst Actor for Sandler (lost to John Travolta), Worst On-Screen Couple for Sandler and that unfunny bulldog (lost to John Travolta and everyone in the galaxy for Battlefield Earth), Most Annoying Fake Accent for Sandler, Worst On-Screen Hairstyle for Sandler (lost to both Travolta and Forest Whitaker for Battlefield Earth), Most Annoying Product Placement for Popeyes Chicken (lost to FedEx and Wilson in Cast Away), and Most Unfunny Comic Relief for the painfully unfunny talking bulldog (lost to Tom Green for Road Trip and Charlie's Angels). As noted, its only win was for Most Annoying Fake Accent.

== Home media ==
Little Nicky was released on DVD and VHS on April 24, 2001, by New Line Home Entertainment. The DVD includes two audio commentaries, a special feature dedicated to rock/metal music, the music video "School of Hard Knocks" by P.O.D., and deleted scenes.

Scream Factory released the film on Blu-ray on August 8, 2023, with all the special features from the DVD (excluding the music video) and a new master from a 2K scan.

== Soundtrack ==
Little Nicky (Music from the Motion Picture)

Soundtrack album by various artists
- Released: October 31, 2000
- Genre: Nu metal
- Length: 48:31
- Label: Maverick
- Producers: Adam Sandler (exec.); Guy Oseary (exec.); Michael Dilbeck (exec.); Ben Grosse; Deftones; Disturbed; DJ Crook; DJ Muggs; Don Gilmore; Incubus; Johnny K; John Leckie; Jonah Matranga; P.O.D.; Powerman 5000; Richard Patrick; Rick Rubin; Scott Litt; Sylvia Massy; Terry Date

Singles from Little Nicky (Music from the Motion Picture)
- 1. "School of Hard Knocks" Released: December 2000

Professional ratings
Review scores
Source	Rating
AllMusic	3/5 stars
Soundtrack.Net	2.5/5 stars

The soundtrack album, Little Nicky (Music from the Motion Picture), was released October 31, 2000, through Maverick Records and featured a lineup that leaned heavily toward Maverick recording artists that included Deftones, Insolence, Muse and Ünloco.

No.	Title	Writer(s)	Producer(s)	Length
1.	"School of Hard Knocks" (performed by P.O.D.)	Paul Joshua Sandoval; Marcos Curiel; Mark Daniels; Noah Bernardo	P.O.D.; Rick Rubin	4:04
2.	"Pardon Me" (performed by Incubus)	Brandon Boyd; Michael Einziger; José Pasillas; Alex Katunich; Chris Kilmore	Incubus; Scott Litt	3:45
3.	"Change (In the House of Flies)" (performed by Deftones)	Chino Moreno; Chi Cheng; Abe Cunningham; Stephen Carpenter	Deftones; Terry Date	4:58
4.	"(Rock) Superstar" (performed by Cypress Hill)	Louis Freese; Senen Reyes; Lawrence Muggerud	DJ Muggs	4:37
5.	"Natural High" (performed by Insolence)	Mark Herman; William Rosenthal; Armando Cardenas; Paul Perry	Sylvia Massy	3:20
6.	"Points of Authority" (performed by Linkin Park)	Chester Bennington; Mike Shinoda; Rob Bourdon; Brad Delson; Joe Hahn	Don Gilmore	3:21
7.	"Stupify (Fu's Forbidden Little Nicky Remix)" (performed by Disturbed)	David Draiman; Dan Donegan; Mike Wengren; Steve Kmak	Disturbed; Johnny K	5:08
8.	"Nothing" (performed by Ünloco)	Joey L. Dueñas; Brian Arthur; Peter Navarrete; Victor Escareño	Johnny K	2:40
9.	"When Worlds Collide" (performed by Powerman 5000)	Michael Cummings; Adam Williams; Mike Tempesta; Dorian Heartsong; Allan Pahanish	Powerman 5000; Sylvia Massy	2:57
10.	"Cave" (performed by Muse)	Matt Bellamy	John Leckie	4:46
11.	"Take a Picture" (performed by Filter)	Richard Patrick	Ben Grosse; Richard Patrick; Geno Lenardo (co.); Rae DiLeo (co.)	4:22
12.	"Be Quiet and Drive (Far Away) (Acoustic)" (performed by Deftones)	Moreno; Cheng; Cunningham; Carpenter	Chino Moreno; DJ Crook; Jonah Matranga	4:33
Total length:				48:31

Notes

- Tracks 8 and 12 were not featured in the film

== Video game ==
A Game Boy Color game based on the film was released on December 15, 2000.

== See also ==
- Dear Santa, another film that featured both Satan and Lucifer
- List of films about angels
