= Marcos Curiel =

American guitarist

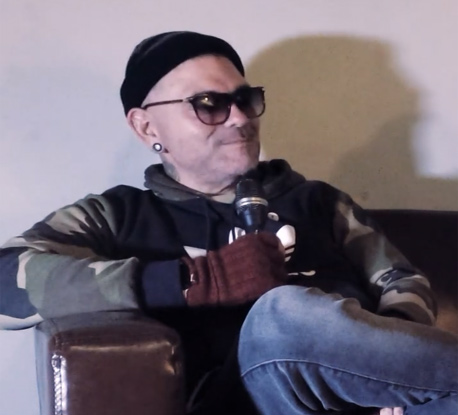
- Curiel in 2019

Background information
- Born: September 9, 1974 (age 51)
- Origin: San Diego, California, U.S.
- Genres: Alternative rock; alternative metal; nu metal; rap metal; progressive rock
- Occupation: Musician
- Instrument: Guitar
- Years active: 1992–present
- Member of: P.O.D.; The Accident Experiment; Daylight Division

Marcos Curiel (born September 9, 1974) is an American musician. He is the lead guitarist of the rock bands P.O.D., The Accident Experiment and Daylight Division. Curiel was born in San Diego, California, in 1974 and is of Mexican descent. He started P.O.D. in 1992 along with friend Noah "Wuv" Bernardo. The band started building a strong local fanbase, releasing several albums independently. In 1998, they were signed to a record deal (Atlantic Records) and released their hit albums The Fundamental Elements of Southtown (1999) and Satellite (2001) including the singles "Alive" and "Youth of the Nation". Both albums have had mainstream success, gaining multi Platinum certifications by the RIAA and three Grammy Award nominations. P.O.D. has also contributed to numerous motion picture soundtracks and toured internationally. Curiel is the youngest member of P.O.D.

== Career ==
=== P.O.D. (1992–2003, 2006–present) ===
In an email sent to fans in 2003, P.O.D. frontman Sonny Sandoval said Curiel left "to pursue his own vision apart from P.O.D." However, Curiel insisted in a phone call from his San Diego home that he was kicked out by Atlantic Records management.

"Because of your loyalty and respect, it saddens me to say that Marcos is no longer with P.O.D.," Sandoval wrote. "Never have we imagined P.O.D. without him, but we now know this vision is bigger than the four of us."

Curiel, who was always an outspoken member of P.O.D., was particularly upset because the band's ex-manager Tim Cook, not his bandmates, called to fire him. He said the group met a few weeks before his removal and everyone acted enthusiastic about his projects. He has been quoted as saying;

"As soon as I was out, they started talking stuff behind my back," he said. "It's very, very shady. I have friends defending me on the Web site, and every time they put something up in defense of me, it gets deleted. I'm like, 'What? This is not fair, dude.' ... Then I found out they had another guitar player already. I was like, 'Whoa, they've been plotting this for a long time.'"

On December 30, 2006, just months after P.O.D. left Atlantic Records and on the same day his replacement Jason Truby left the band, Marcos was asked to rejoin P.O.D. The band announced to their fans via email through their mailing list and via their MySpace page, that Curiel had re-joined. The next day, Curiel played with P.O.D. for the first time since his departure on the Jimmy Kimmel Live! show. Two months later they signed a new deal with INO Records.

=== The Accident Experiment (2002–2007) ===
The Accident Experiment, also known as AeX, is a rock band based in San Diego, California. It was formed in 2002 when co-founder Curiel left the band P.O.D.

The band featured Curiel on guitar, Pete Stewart (Grammatrain) with the vocals, Tony Delocht on bass, and Ernie Longoria on drums (both from Sprung Monkey).

The band's first EP, Arena EP, was released in 2003. In 2005, the band signed to indie label Rock Ridge Music, and their first full-length album, United We Fear, was released in October 2005. A video had been shot and released for the first single Sick Love Letter.

Curiel and Longoria began jamming and they solidly evolved into a steady rock act opening for Foo Fighters, Drowning Pool, Staind, and other known bands.

In December 2006, Curiel re-joined P.O.D. and The Accident Experiment went on hiatus. Their Arena EP was re-released by Rock Ridge Music in May 2007. The EP included some new songs by the group.

- Pete Stewart – vocals
- Marcos Curiel – guitar, producer
- Tony Delocht – bass
- Ernie Longoria – drums

=== Daylight Division ===
In 2009, Curiel formed the band Daylight Division, with Joe Loeffler, formerly of Chevelle, Dave Buckner, of Papa Roach, and Lukas Rossi, of Rock Star Supernova. Rossi left soon after joining. Because the remaining members failed to find a permanent lead vocalist, they disbanded.

== Discography ==
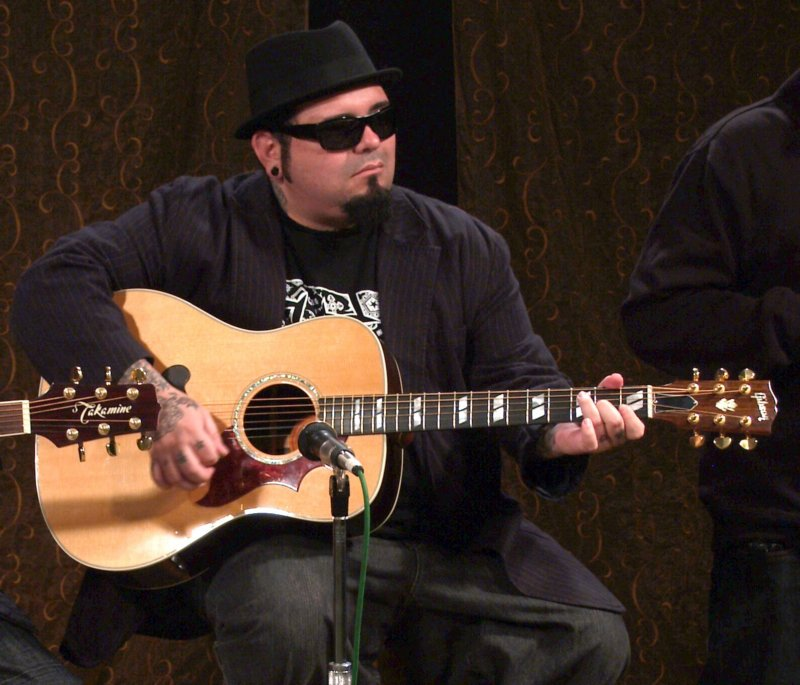
Curiel performing in 2008

=== P.O.D. ===
- Snuff the Punk (1994)
- Brown (1996)
- LIVE at Tomfest (1997)
- The Warriors EP (1998)
- The Fundamental Elements of Southtown (1999)
- Satellite (2001)
- Greatest Hits: The Atlantic Years (2006)
- When Angels & Serpents Dance (2008)
- Murdered Love (2012)
- SoCal Sessions (2014)
- The Awakening (2015)
- Circles (2018)
- Veritas (2024)

=== The Accident Experiment ===
- Arena EP (2003)
- United We Fear (2005)

=== Other appearances ===
- Curiel was featured in, rewrote and produced the Nappy Roots "Awnaw" Rock remix. It also appeared on Madden 2003.
- He worked with Nappy Roots again on track "Right Now" from the soundtrack for Daredevil.
- He played guitar on the Ill Harmonics track "Destiny" from the album Take 2.
- He played guitar on "Quality Junk" from the album Fashion Expo: Round One by various artists.
- He played guest lead guitar on the Silence single remake of "While My Guitar Gently Weeps".
- He played guitar on "Vampire Tactics" from the album Black Eyed Children by rapper Skribbal in 2021.
