= Hoobastank discography =

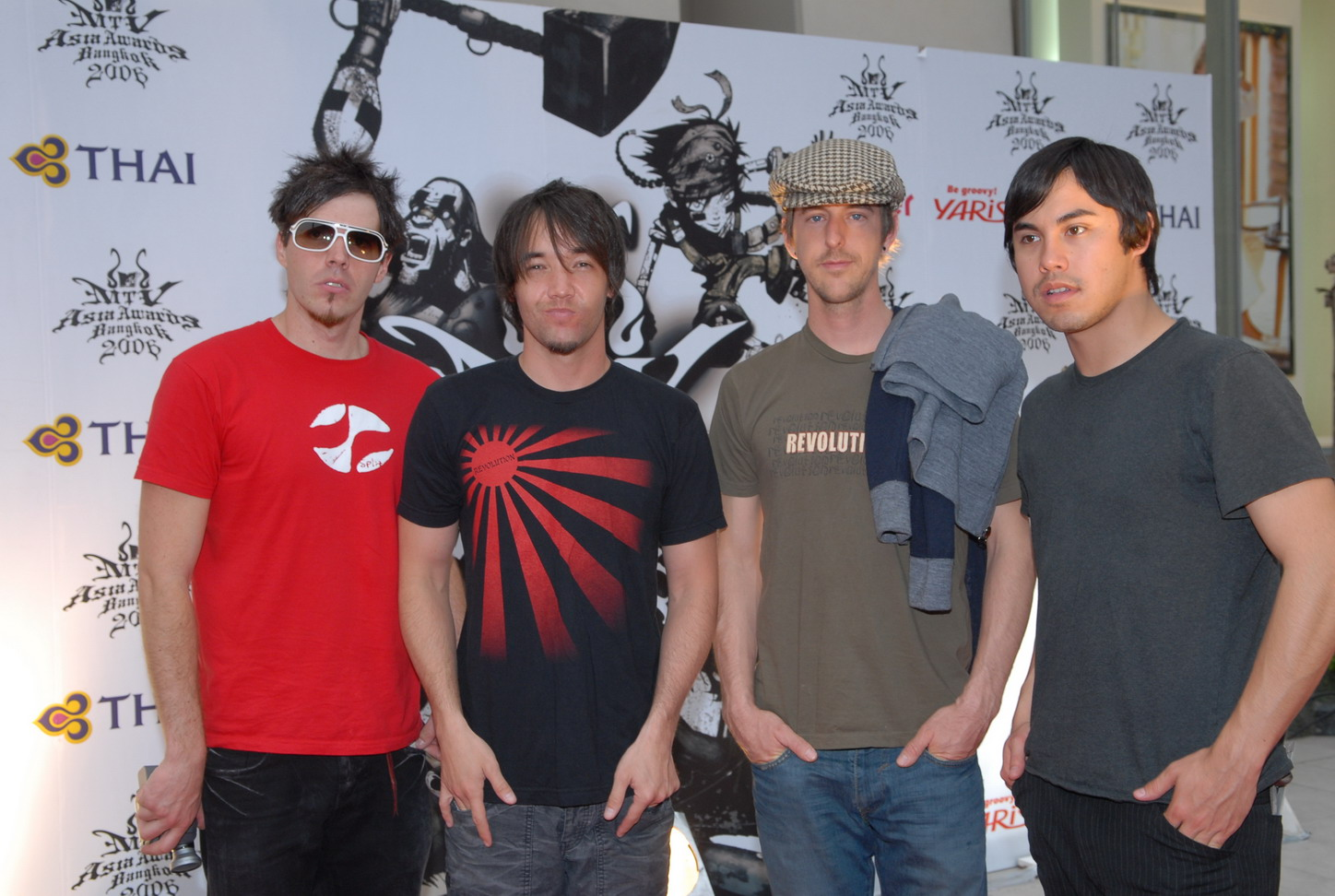
- Hoobastank in 2006
- Studio albums: 6
- Extended plays: 1
- Live albums: 1
- Compilation albums: 3
- Singles: 18
- Video albums: 3
- Music videos: 20

The American rock band Hoobastank has released six studio albums, a live album, three compilation albums, three video albums, one extended play and 20 singles. An unofficial live album, the bootleg Live at Circo Voador, is in circulation among fans.

== Albums ==
=== Studio albums ===
List of studio albums, with selected chart positions and certifications
Title	Album details	Peak chart positions										Certifications
Title	Album details	US	AUS	AUT	CAN	FRA	GER	JPN	SWE	SWI	UK	Certifications
Hoobastank	Released: November 20, 2001; Label: Island; Formats: CD, digital download	25	67	—	84	—	—	—	—	—	96	RIAA: Platinum
The Reason	Released: December 9, 2003; Label: Island; Formats: CD, LP, digital download	3	23	19	9	6	51	79	33	13	41	RIAA: 2× Platinum; ARIA: Gold; BPI: Gold; MC: Platinum; RIAJ: Gold; RMNZ: Gold; SNEP: Gold
Every Man for Himself	Released: May 16, 2006; Label: Island; Formats: CD, digital download	12	—	68	44	73	32	8	—	45	—	RIAA: Gold
For(N)ever	Released: January 27, 2009; Label: Island; Formats: CD, digital download	26	88	—	—	—	—	6	—	—	—	
Fight or Flight	Released: September 11, 2012; Label: Open E; Formats: CD, digital download	66	—	—	—	—	—	18	—	—	—	
Push Pull	Released: May 25, 2018; Label: Napalm; Formats: CD, digital download	—	—	—	—	—	—	—	—	—	—	
"—" denotes a recording that did not chart or was not released in that territory.

=== Independent albums ===
List of independent albums
Title	Album details
They Sure Don't Make Basketball Shorts Like They Used To	Released: July 10, 1998; Format: CD

=== Live albums ===
List of live albums
Title	Album details
Live at Circo Voador	Unofficial bootleg, recorded 2004
Live from the Wiltern	Released: December 8, 2009; Label: Island; Format: Digital download

=== Compilation albums ===
List of compilation albums, with selected chart positions
Title	Album details	Peak chart positions
Title	Album details	JPN
The Greatest Hits: Don't Touch My Moustache	Released: August 5, 2009; Label: Universal International Japan; Formats: CD	24
Is This the Day?	Released: July 30, 2010; Label: Island; Formats: CD	7
Icon	Released: August 31, 2010; Label: Island; Formats: CD	—
"—" denotes a recording that did not chart or was not released in that territory.

=== Video albums ===
List of video albums
Title	Album details
Let It Out	Released: 2004; Label: Island; Formats: DVD
La Cigale	Released: 2006; Label: Island; Formats: DVD
Live from the Wiltern	Released: 2010; Label: Island; Formats: Digital download

== Extended plays ==
List of extended plays
Title	EP details
Untitled Demo #1 (1995)	Released: 1995; Formats: CS
Untitled Demo #2 (1995)	Released: 1995; Formats: CS
Muffins	Released: 1997; Formats: CS
The Target EP	Released: 2002; Label: Island; Formats: CD

== Singles ==
List of singles, with selected chart positions and certifications, showing year released and album name
Title	Year	Peak chart positions										Certifications	Album
Title	Year	US	US Adult	US Alt.	US Main. Rock	AUS	AUT	GER	JPN	SWI	UK	Certifications	Album
"Crawling in the Dark"	2001	68	—	3	7	61	—	—	—	—	47		Hoobastank
"Running Away"	2002	44	31	2	9	83	—	—	—	—	100		Hoobastank
"Remember Me"	2002	—	—	23	28	—	—	—	—	—	—		Hoobastank
"Out of Control"	2003	—	—	9	16	—	—	—	—	—	—		The Reason
"The Reason"	2003	2	1	1	4	7	5	15	79	6	12	RIAA: 4× Platinum; ARIA: Gold; BPI: Platinum; BVMI: Gold; RMNZ: 3× Platinum	The Reason
"Same Direction"	2004	—	—	14	20	—	—	49	—	—	—		The Reason
"Disappear"	2004	—^{[A]}	16	24	—	—	75	99	—	—	—		The Reason
"If I Were You"	2006	—^{[B]}	18	23	—	—	60	58	—	100	—		Every Man for Himself
"Inside of You"	2006	—	—	27	27	—	—	—	—	—	—		Every Man for Himself
"Born to Lead"	2006	—	—	—	25	—	—	—	—	—	—		Every Man for Himself
"My Turn"	2008	—	—	24	23	—	—	—	31	—	—		For(N)ever
"So Close, So Far"	2009	—	24	—	—	—	—	—	—	—	—		For(N)ever
"The Letter" (featuring Vanessa Amorosi)	2009	—	—	—	—	39	—	—	—	—	—		For(N)ever
"Never Be Here Again"	2010	—	—	—	—	—	—	—	—	—	—		AT&T Team USA Olympics soundtrack
"Is This the Day?"	2010	—	—	—	—	—	—	—	74	—	—		Is This the Day?
"This Is Gonna Hurt"	2012	—	—	—	28	—	—	—	70	—	—		Fight or Flight
"Can You Save Me?"	2013	—	—	—	—	—	—	—	—	—	—		Fight or Flight
"Incomplete"	2013	—	—	—	—	—	—	—	—	—	—		Fight or Flight
"More Beautiful"	2018	—	—	—	—	—	—	—	—	—	—		Push Pull
"Push Pull"	2018	—	—	—	—	—	—	—	—	—	—		Push Pull
"How Do You Sleep?"	2026	—	—	—	—	—	—	—	—	—	—		—
"—" denotes a recording that did not chart or was not released in that territory.

== Soundtracks ==
List of non-single guest appearances, showing year released and album name
Title	Year	Album
"Losing My Grip"	2002	The Scorpion King soundtrack
"Right Before Your Eyes"	2003	Daredevil: The Album
"Did You"	2004	Music from and Inspired by Spider-Man 2
"Connected"	2004	Halo 2 soundtrack
"Say the Same"	2009	The Stepfather soundtrack
"I Don't Think I Love You"	2009	Transformers: Revenge of the Fallen – The Album

== Music videos ==
List of music videos, showing year released and director
Title	Year	Director(s)
"Earthsick"	1998	Avi Roffman
"Up and Gone"	2000	Adam Baxter
"Crawling in the Dark"	2002	Marcos Siega
"Running Away"	2002	Paul Fedor
"Remember Me"	2002	VEM & Tony
"Out of Control"	2003	Nathan Cox
"The Reason"	2004	Brett Simon
"Same Direction"	2004	Brett Simon
"Disappear"	2004	Marc Webb
"Let It Out"	2005	—N/a
"If I Were You"	2006	Hype Williams
"Inside of You"	2006	Lex Halaby
"Born to Lead"	2006	—N/a
"My Turn"	2009	P. R. Brown
"The Letter"	2009	P. R. Brown
"So Close, So Far"	2009	—N/a
"Ghostbusters"	2009	—N/a
"This Is Gonna Hurt"	2012	—N/a
"Can You Save Me?"	2013	Dan Estrin
"How Do You Sleep"	2026	Matt Akana

== Notes ==
- A "Disappear" did not enter the Billboard Hot 100, but peaked at number one on the Bubbling Under Hot 100 Singles chart, which acts as a 25-song extension to the Hot 100.
- B "If I Were You" did not enter the Billboard Hot 100, peaked at number 17 on the Bubbling Under Hot 100 Singles chart, which acts as a 25-song extension to the Hot 100.
