= Circo Voador =

Music venue in Rio de Janeiro

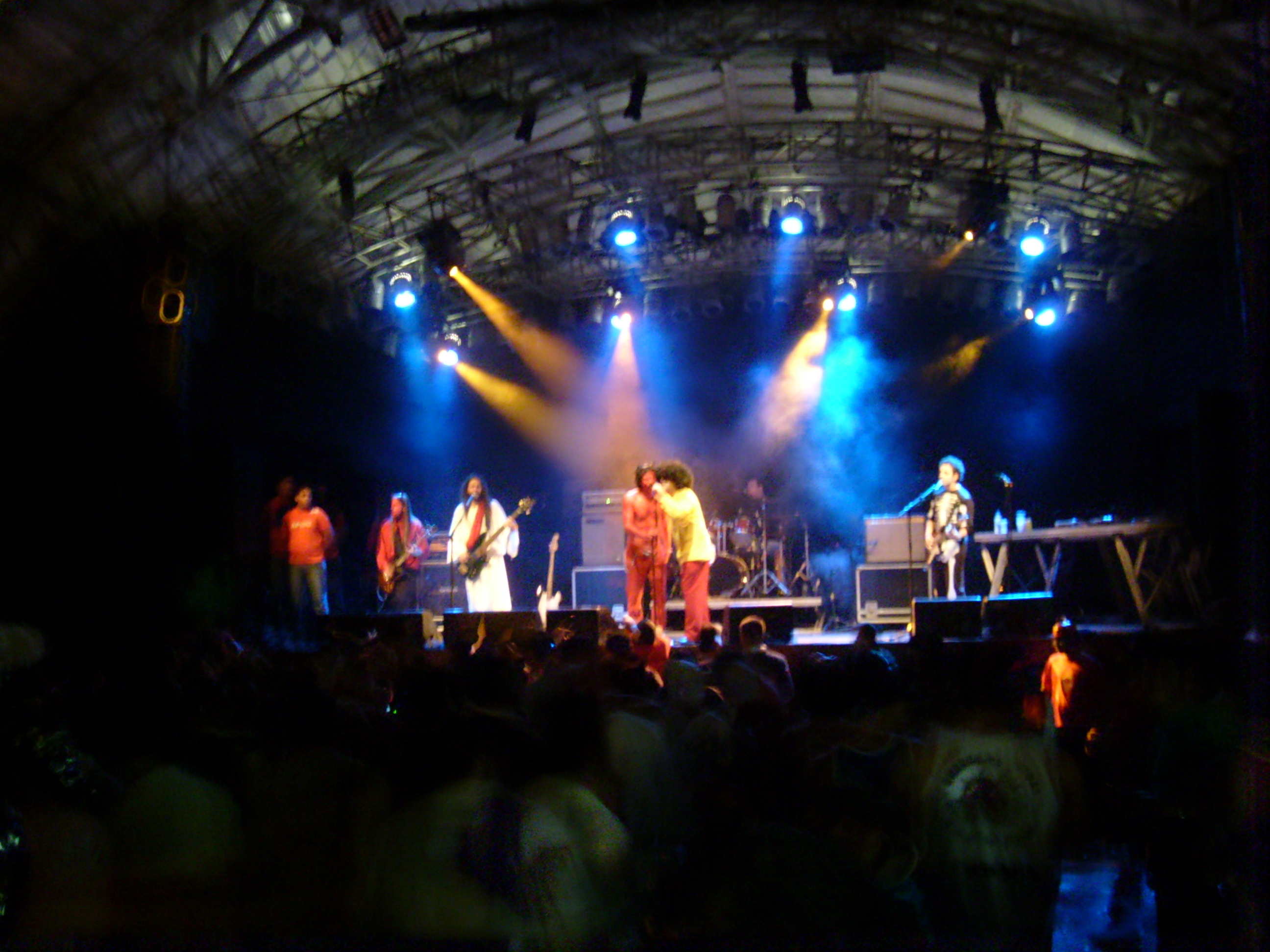
- Brazilian act Palco in 2008
- Interactive map of Circo Voador
- Address: Rua dos Arcos Lapa; Rio de Janeiro, 20230-060 Brazil
- Location: Lapa
- Coordinates: 22.9128°S 43.1803°W
- Capacity: 2200
- Public transit: 7 minutes from Cinelândia Station, Rio de Janeiro Metro

Construction
- Opened: 1982

Website
- Venue Website

Circo Voador (Portuguese for Flying Circus) is a concert venue in Rio de Janeiro, Brazil. Located adjacent to the Carioca Aqueduct in the Lapa neighborhood, it is a large tent-like structure covering the stage and spectator areas, but with open sides. It has weekly concerts by Brazilian bands and artists, with occasional appearances by foreign artists or theme parties.

== History ==
Circo Voador began in 1982 in Arpoador, the peninsula between Ipanema and Copacabana, when local artists erected a circus tent to display their work. The city eventually granted the land where the venue currently sits as a permanent home.

The venue housed concerts by Brazilian rock groups such as Barão Vermelho, Blitz, and Os Paralamas do Sucesso,as well as stage companies such as Asdrúbal Trouxe o Trombone.

Circo Voador was closed from 1996 to 2002 by the mayor César Maia, after an incident where Luiz Paulo Conde, the mayor-elect at the 1996 municipal elections, and his crew were hostilized by the audience and the artists during a concert of punk bands Ratos de Porão and Garotos Podres.

== See also ==
- Live at Circo Voador by Hoobastank, 2004
