= The Reason (Hoobastank song) =

2004 single by Hoobastank

Single by Hoobastank

from the album The Reason
- B-side: "Out of Control" (live)
- Released: January 26, 2004
- Studio: Bay 7 (Valley Village, Los Angeles); Sparky Dark (Calabasas, California)
- Genre: Alternative rock; pop rock
- Length: 3:53
- Label: Island; Mercury
- Composer: Daniel Estrin
- Lyricist: Douglas Robb
- Producer: Howard Benson

Hoobastank singles chronology
"Out of Control" (2003)	"The Reason" (2004)	"Same Direction" (2004)

Music video
- "The Reason" on YouTube

"The Reason" is a song by American rock band Hoobastank. Released on January 26, 2004, as the second single from their second studio album of the same name, the power ballad is Hoobastank's most commercially successful single, peaking at number two on the US Billboard Hot 100 and number one on the US Modern Rock Tracks chart. In 2005, it was nominated for two categories at the 47th Annual Grammy Awards: Song of the Year and Best Pop Performance by a Duo or Group with Vocals. Internationally, "The Reason" reached number one in Bolivia, Canada, Ecuador, and Italy while peaking within the top 10 in 13 additional countries.

== Background and release ==
Following Hoobastank's tour in support of their 2001 self-titled debut album, the band began writing songs again for a follow-up album. Upon playing the opening riff of "The Reason", guitarist Dan Estrin began to flesh out the song and sent a completed instrumental demo to lead singer Douglas Robb. Using pieces of old lyrics and stream-of-thought ideas written in his journal, Robb quickly constructed the song's lyrics.

"The Reason" was first released as part of the band's second studio album The Reason on December 9, 2003. Robb noted how "Out of Control" was chosen as the album's first single due to its more heavy sound, despite their record label's insistence that "The Reason" be released. However, the band eventually decided to release the song as a single, and it was serviced to radio stations starting January 26, 2004.

== Chart performance ==
On March 20, 2004, the song debuted on the US Billboard Hot 100 at number 62, becoming that week's "Hot Shot Debut". It reached its peak of number two after 13 more weeks on the listing, giving the band their highest-charting US single. Though it remained on the chart for 38 issues, it was their last Hot 100 hit. The single peaked atop the Billboard Adult Top 40, Modern Rock Tracks, and Mainstream Top 40 charts. In Canada, it topped Radio & Records' CHR/Pop, Hot AC, and Rock charts. The song was a radio hit in Central and South America, topping the airplay charts of Bolivia and Ecuador and peaking at number three in El Salvador.

In Europe, "The Reason" reached number one on the Italian Singles Chart and the UK Rock & Metal Singles Chart for two weeks each. On the UK Singles Chart, it debuted and peaked at number 12, while on the Scottish Singles Chart, it entered the top 10, peaking at number six. Across the rest of Europe, the track entered the top 10 in Austria, the Czech Republic, Greece, Latvia, the Netherlands, Norway, Sweden, Switzerland, and Wallonia. It was also successful in Oceania, reaching number seven in Australia and number five in New Zealand.

== Music video ==
The music video for the song was directed by Brett Simon. In it, the band members stage a diversion so they can carry out the elaborate theft of "The Chiara Ruby #2" gem from a pawnshop, but those facts are only clear after enough of the action unfolds: nothing is as it seems. At the beginning of the video, a woman (played by Serbian model Nevena Milicevic) gets hit by a car driven by vocalist Doug Robb. After the "accident", while everyone's attention is diverted, Chris Hesse and Dan Estrin execute the heist. The viewer then realizes that she was in on the operation, as she gets up and rides off with an accomplice on a motorcycle at the end. The presumed owner of the pawnshop displays a look of realization, and the song ends with the band admiring their new acquisition, holding it up to the light and projecting red light-rays onto the ceiling. The accident's "victim" is also present. They then hear police sirens from above, and the video fades out.

Their music video "Same Direction" is intended as both a sequel and a prequel to the video for "The Reason" and further details the band members' roles, as well as showing the trouble they bring down on themselves from law enforcement. On August 21, 2023, the music video reached one billion views on YouTube.

== Legacy ==
=== 2021 TikTok trend ===
In February 2021, the song became the subject of a viral trend on the app TikTok, where users, under the hashtag "#NotAPerfectPerson", would post videos featuring the song alongside text describing their embarrassing moments and personal flaws. Ellise Shafer of Variety suggested that the song's sudden resurgence was due to a combination of nostalgia and the song's lyrical relatability. As a result of the trend, Hoobastank created a TikTok account, with lead singer Doug Robb partaking in the challenge by making fun of the band's nonsensical name.

=== Usage in media ===
"The Reason" has been included in various television episodes. On May 6, 2004, the song appeared in "The One Before the Last One", a special episode of the sitcom Friends. The song later appeared on the first episode of the 2023 Netflix show Beef, with lead actor Steven Yeun saying that the band was a "perfect analogy" for the show's theme of "excavating the cringe of our childhood". "The Reason" was also covered in the second season of the British sitcom We Are Lady Parts, with creator Nida Manzoor opting to cover the song instead of writing an original one.

== Track listings ==
UK CD1

1. "The Reason" – 3:52
2. "Crawling in the Dark" (acoustic version) – 3:09

UK CD2

1. "The Reason" – 3:52
2. "Out of Control" (live) – 2:52
3. "Running Away" – 2:59
4. "The Reason" (video) – 3:52

UK 7-inch single

A. "The Reason" – 3:53
B. "Out of Control" (live) – 2:52

European CD single

1. "The Reason" (album version) – 3:52
2. "Meet Hoobastank" – 5:49

Australian CD single

1. "The Reason" (album version) – 3:52
2. "Meet Hoobastank" – 5:49
3. "Crawling in the Dark" (acoustic version) – 3:09
4. "The Reason" (video)

== Credits and personnel ==
Credits are adapted from the US promo CD liner notes and The Reason album booklet.

Studios

- Recorded at Bay 7 Studios (Valley Village, Los Angeles) and Sparky Dark Studios (Calabasas, California)
- Strings recorded at Capitol Studios (Hollywood, California)
- Mixed at Image Recording (Hollywood, California)
- Mastered at Precision Mastering (Los Angeles)

Personnel

- Daniel Estrin – music, guitar
- Douglas Robb – lyrics, vocals
- Markku Lappalainen – bass
- Chris Hesse – drums
- Howard Benson – production, keyboards
- Mike Plotnikoff – recording
- Casey Stone – recording (strings)
- Chris Lord-Alge – mixing
- Deborah Lurie – string arrangement
- Tom Baker – mastering

== Charts ==
=== Weekly charts ===
2004 weekly chart performance for "The Reason"
Chart (2004)	Peak position
Australia (ARIA)	7
Austria (Ö3 Austria Top 40)	5
Belgium (Ultratop 50 Flanders)	12
Belgium (Ultratop 50 Wallonia)	7
Bolivia (Notimex)	1
Canada Radio (Nielsen BDS)	1
Canada AC Top 30 (Radio & Records)	3
Canada CHR/Pop Top 30 (Radio & Records)	1
Canada Hot AC Top 30 (Radio & Records)	1
Canada Rock Top 30 (Radio & Records)	1
Czech Republic (IFPI)	2
Denmark (Tracklisten)	20
Ecuador (Notimex)	1
El Salvador (Notimex)	3
European Airplay (Eurochart Hot 100)	1
Germany (GfK)	15
Greece (IFPI)	8
Hungary (Rádiós Top 40)	20
Ireland (IRMA)	35
Italy (FIMI)	1
Latvia (Latvijas Top 40)	10
Netherlands (Dutch Top 40)	9
Netherlands (Single Top 100)	16
New Zealand (Recorded Music NZ)	5
Norway (VG-lista)	9
Scottish Singles Sales (Official Charts)	6
Sweden (Sverigetopplistan)	8
Switzerland (Schweizer Hitparade)	6
UK Singles (Official Charts)	12
UK Rock & Metal (Official Charts)	1
US Billboard Hot 100	2
US Adult Contemporary (Billboard)	17
US Adult Pop Airplay (Billboard)	1
US Alternative Airplay (Billboard)	1
US Mainstream Rock Airplay (Billboard)	4
US Pop Airplay (Billboard)	1

2021 weekly chart performance for "The Reason"
Chart (2021)	Peak position
US Hot Rock & Alternative Songs (Billboard)	25

2026 weekly chart performance for "The Reason"
Chart (2026)	Peak position
Global 200 (Billboard)	189
Portugal (AFP)	189

=== Year-end charts ===
2004 year-end chart performance for "The Reason"
Chart (2004)	Position
Australia (ARIA)	58
Austria (Ö3 Austria Top 40)	31
Belgium (Ultratop 50 Flanders)	97
Belgium (Ultratop 50 Wallonia)	55
Brazil (Crowley)	11
Germany (Media Control GfK)	75
Italy (FIMI)	48
Netherlands (Dutch Top 40)	28
Netherlands (Single Top 100)	96
New Zealand (RIANZ)	43
Sweden (Hitlistan)	82
Switzerland (Schweizer Hitparade)	44
UK Singles (OCC)	177
US Billboard Hot 100	6
US Adult Contemporary (Billboard)	32
US Adult Top 40 (Billboard)	2
US Mainstream Rock Tracks (Billboard)	23
US Mainstream Top 40 (Billboard)	2
US Modern Rock Tracks (Billboard)	5

2005 year-end chart performance for "The Reason"
Chart (2005)	Position
US Adult Top 40 (Billboard)	36

=== Decade-end charts ===
Decade-end chart performance for "The Reason"
Chart (2000–2009)	Position
US Mainstream Top 40 (Billboard)	25

== Certifications ==
Certifications and sales for "The Reason"
Region	Certification	Certified units/sales
Australia (ARIA)	Gold	35,000^{^}
Brazil (Pro-Música Brasil)	Platinum	60,000^{‡}
Denmark (IFPI Danmark)	Gold	45,000^{‡}
Germany (BVMI)	Gold	150,000^{‡}
Italy (FIMI)	Platinum	100,000^{‡}
New Zealand (RMNZ)	3× Platinum	90,000^{‡}
Spain (Promusicae)	Platinum	60,000^{‡}
United Kingdom (BPI)	Platinum	600,000^{‡}
United States (RIAA)	4× Platinum	4,000,000^{‡}
Ringtone / Mastertone
United States (RIAA) Mastertone	Gold	500,000^{*}
^{*} Sales figures based on certification alone.^{^} Shipments figures based on certification alone.^{‡} Sales+streaming figures based on certification alone.

== Release history ==
Release dates and formats for "The Reason"
Region	Date	Format(s)	Label(s)	Ref.
United States	January 26, 2004	Alternative radio	Island	
United States	February 4, 2004	Mainstream rock; active rock radio	Island	
United States	February 23, 2004	Contemporary hit; hot adult contemporary radio	Island	
Australia	May 17, 2004	CD	Island	
United Kingdom	May 31, 2004	7-inch vinyl	Mercury	
