= Marc Webb =

American filmmaker (born 1974)

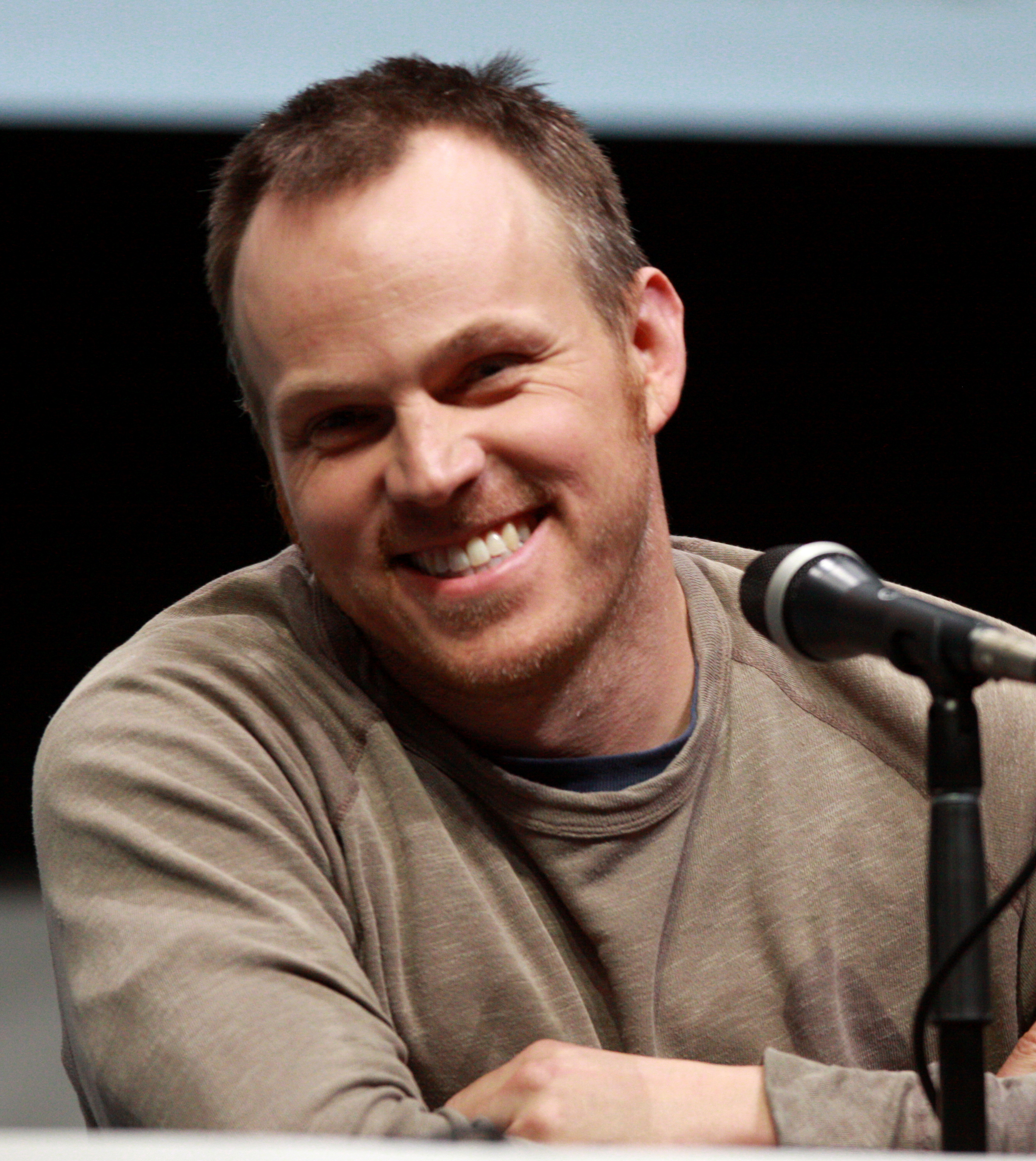
- Webb at the 2013 San Diego Comic-Con
- Born: Marc Preston Webb; August 31, 1974 (age 52); Bloomington, Indiana, U.S.
- Education: Colorado College; University of Wisconsin–Madison
- Occupations: Filmmaker; music video director
- Years active: 1996–present
- Spouse: Jane Herman (m. 2019)
- Children: 2

Marc Preston Webb (born August 31, 1974) is an American filmmaker and music video director. He made his feature film directorial debut in 2009 with the romantic comedy 500 Days of Summer. He then directed The Amazing Spider-Man (2012) and The Amazing Spider-Man 2 (2014), which later were dubbed the "Webb-Verse" by Marvel Studios in 2021. He also directed the 2017 dramas Gifted and The Only Living Boy in New York and the Disney live-action remake of Snow White (2025). His next planned film is Day Drinker (2027).

== Early life ==
Webb was born on 31 August 1974 in Bloomington, Indiana, the son of Margaret Ruth (née Stocker), a scientist, and Norman Lott Webb, who works in math education at the University of Wisconsin in Madison, Wisconsin. When he was eighteen months old, Marc's family moved to Madison and he grew up there. He graduated from Madison West High School in the city in 1992. He attended Colorado College and then the University of Wisconsin in Madison, graduating with an English degree.

== Career ==
Marc Webb began as an editor before turning to directing music videos. He told The Daily Beast: "The very first video I did was for a band called The Shame Idols in Birmingham, Alabama, and I paid for it on a credit card and my mom loaned me about $500 to finish it. It was actually about a superhero—a Catwoman-y type of thing. This woman who sewed the costume together, and we shot it on 16mm film. You can't see it anywhere and it's not on YouTube—and I'm glad it's not. The first video that got shown was a Blues Traveler video called "Canadian Rose," but I just did the concept stuff for it." Between 1999 and 2009, he directed videos for the likes of Good Charlotte, Evanescence, AFI, 3 Doors Down, Green Day, My Chemical Romance, and Snow Patrol.

His feature-length debut, 500 Days of Summer, starring Joseph Gordon-Levitt and Zooey Deschanel, was released in July 2009 to a positive critical reception. In January 2010, Columbia Pictures hired Webb to direct The Amazing Spider-Man, a reboot of the Spider-Man film franchise, released in July 2012 and starring Andrew Garfield and Emma Stone. He returned to direct the sequel, The Amazing Spider-Man 2, which was released on May 2, 2014. Developing the 2021 Marvel Cinematic Universe (MCU) film Spider-Man: No Way Home for Marvel Studios, Chris McKenna and Erik Sommers officially dubbed the fictional universe of Webb's Spider-Man films as the Webb-Verse in his honor. In November 2021, it was revealed that he and Sam Raimi were brought on as creative consultants for the film. In 2015, Webb directed promotional ads for a partnership between Samsung and Avengers: Age of Ultron.

Webb is represented by DNA in Hollywood, California and Academy Productions Ltd in the United Kingdom. In February 2019, he signed on to direct the live-action reimagined version of the 2016 Japanese anime film Your Name before he was replaced on September 18, 2020, by Lee Isaac Chung and a year later by Carlos López Estrada. In May 2019, it was announced that Webb will direct a live-action adaptation of Disney's Snow White and the Seven Dwarfs.

In 2013, Christopher Keyser and Webb pitched the mystery drama The Society to Showtime, but the network later decided to pass on the series. Netflix turned the pitch into a series instead; created by Keyser and executive produced by both Keyser and Webb, The Society premiered on May 19, 2019. In July 2019, it was announced that Webb and Black Lamb Productions, his production company signed a deal with ABC Studios. In March 2022, Webb signed on to direct the supernatural thriller Day Drinker, written by Zach Dean.

== Personal life ==
On June 8, 2018, Webb's girlfriend Jane Herman had a daughter, Georgia. The couple married on October 4, 2019. Their son, Walter, was born on April 5, 2021.

== Webb's lamb ==
Webb's signature is a white lamb, which appears in a few of his videos. In Brand New's "Sic Transit Gloria... Glory Fades" video, the lamb appears on the door before Jesse Lacey enters the bar. It also is on the shirt of a girl in the bar. In Yellowcard's "Ocean Avenue" and "Rough Landing, Holly" videos, the lamb appears on a briefcase Ryan Key carries.

== Filmography ==
=== Film ===
Year	Title	Distribution
2009	500 Days of Summer	Fox Searchlight Pictures
2012	The Amazing Spider-Man	Sony Pictures Releasing
2014	The Amazing Spider-Man 2	Sony Pictures Releasing
2017	Gifted	Fox Searchlight Pictures
2017	The Only Living Boy in New York	Amazon Studios
2025	Snow White	Walt Disney Studios Motion Pictures
2027	Day Drinker	Lionsgate

=== Television ===
Year	Title	Director	Executive producer	Writer	Note
2010	The Office	Yes	No	No	Episode: "The Manager and the Salesman"
2010	Lone Star	Yes	No	No	Episode: "Pilot"
2012	Battleground	No	Yes	No	
2015–2016	Limitless	Yes	Yes	Yes	Directed "Pilot"; Co-wrote and directed "Badge! Gun!"
2015–2019	Crazy Ex-Girlfriend	Yes	Yes	Yes	Directed "Josh Just Happens to Live Here!", Co-wrote and directed "Where Is Josh's Friend?"
2018–2019	Instinct	Yes	Yes	No	Episode: "Pilot"
2019	The Code	Yes	Yes	No	Episode: "Blowed Up"
2019	The Society	Yes	Yes	No	Episodes: "What Happened", "Our Town" and "How it Happens"
2019–2022	Blood & Treasure	No	Yes	No	
2019–2021	Why Women Kill	Yes	Yes	No	Episodes: "Murder Means Never Having To Say You’re Sorry" and "I'd Liked To Kill Ya But I Just Washed My Hair"
2021	Rebel	Yes	Yes	No	Episode: "Pilot"
2021	The Republic of Sarah	No	Yes	No	
2021	Just Beyond	Yes	Yes	No	Episodes: "Leave Them Kids Alone" and "We've Got Spirits, Yes We Do"
2024	Death and Other Details	Yes	Yes	No	Episode: "Chapter One: Rare"
2024	High Potential	Yes	No	No	Episode: "Dancer in the Dark"
TBA	Rose Hill	Yes	Yes	No	Filming; 2 episodes

=== Music videos ===
Year	Title	Artist
1997	"Canadian Rose"	Blues Traveler
1999	"Still After You"	Earth to Andy
2000	"Just Got Wicked"	Cold
2000	"Not That Kind"	Anastacia
2001	"On the Line"	Lance Bass
2001	"Duck and Run"	3 Doors Down
2001	"The Motivation Proclamation"	Good Charlotte
2001	"The Days of the Phoenix"	AFI
2001	"Duke Lion"	Big Dumb Face
2001	"Are You There?"	Oleander
2001	"Waiting"	Green Day
2001	"Festival Song"	Good Charlotte
2001	"Simple Creed"	Live featuring Tricky
2001	"Slow"	Professional Murder Music
2001	"Pain"	Stereomud
2001	"Eleanor Rigby"	Godhead
2001	"Beat the World"	Pressure 4-5
2002	"Seein' Red"	Unwritten Law
2002	"American Girls"	Counting Crows
2002	"Unreal"	SOiL
2002	"She Hates Me"	Puddle of Mudd
2002	"Harder to Breathe"	Maroon 5
2002	"I Will Be Heard"	Hatebreed
2002	"When You’re on Top"	The Wallflowers
2002	"These Are the Days"	O-Town
2002	"Remember Me"	Hoobastank
2002	"Remember"	Disturbed
2003	"Stupid Girl"	Cold
2003	"Sleeping Awake"	P.O.D.
2003	"The Leaving Song Pt. II"	AFI
2003	"Why Don't You & I"	Santana & Alex Band
2003	"Here Without You"	3 Doors Down
2003	"Savior"	Memento
2003	"Say You Will"	Wakefield
2003	"Everything Sucks (When You're Gone)"	MxPx
2003	"Will You"	P.O.D.
2003	"Sic Transit Gloria... Glory Fades"	Brand New
2003	"Nothing at All"	Santana featuring Musiq
2004	"With My Mind"	Cold
2004	"Change the World"	P.O.D.
2004	"I Don't Want to Be"	Gavin DeGraw
2004	"Silhouettes"	Smile Empty Soul
2004	"Heel over Head"	Puddle of Mudd
2004	"Give It Up"	Midtown
2004	"Ocean Avenue"	Yellowcard
2004	"I'm Not Okay (I Promise)"	My Chemical Romance
2004	"Breaking the Broken"	Sparta
2004	"Beautiful Soul"	Jesse McCartney
2004	"Walk into the Sun"	Dirty Vegas
2004	"Blood Red Summer"	Coheed and Cambria
2004	"Dare You to Move" (version 2)	Switchfoot
2004	"Disappear"	Hoobastank
2005	"Work"	Jimmy Eat World
2005	"Bad Day"	Daniel Powter
2005	"All That I've Got"	The Used
2005	"Helena"	My Chemical Romance
2005	"Chocolate"	Snow Patrol
2005	"Eleanor"	Low Millions
2005	"Gotta Make It"	Trey Songz featuring Twista
2005	"Don’t Look Back"	Antigone Rising
2005	"Different"	Acceptance
2005	"Middle of Nowhere"	Hot Hot Heat
2005	"Make a Move"	Incubus
2005	"Wake Up"	Hilary Duff
2005	"The Ghost of You"	My Chemical Romance
2005	"Boyfriend"	Ashlee Simpson
2005	"Free Loop (One Night Stand)"	Daniel Powter
2005	"Lights and Sounds"	Yellowcard
2005	"Perfect Situation"	Weezer
2006	"Move Along"	The All-American Rejects
2006	"Youth"	Matisyahu
2006	"Rush"	Aly & AJ
2006	"Lie to Me"	Daniel Powter
2006	"Rough Landing, Holly"	Yellowcard
2006	"Miss Murder"	AFI
2006	"Invisible"	Ashlee Simpson
2006	"London Bridge"	Fergie
2006	"Fidelity"	Regina Spektor
2006	"Call Me When You're Sober"	Evanescence
2006	"Love Like Winter"	AFI
2006	"Wait a Minute"	The Pussycat Dolls featuring Timbaland
2006	"Rain"	Barefoot
2006	"These Walls" (Version 2)	Teddy Geiger
2007	"The River"	Good Charlotte
2007	"Must Have Done Something Right"	Relient K
2007	"Last Night"	P. Diddy
2007	"I Don't Love You"	My Chemical Romance
2007	"Teenagers"	My Chemical Romance
2007	"Blood"	My Chemical Romance
2007	"Good Enough" (co-directed with Rich Lee)	Evanescence
2007	"Stiff Kittens" (co-directed with Rich Lee)	Blaqk Audio
2007	"Clumsy" (co-directed with Rich Lee)	Fergie
2007	"Better" (Version 2)	Regina Spektor
2007	"Start All Over"	Miley Cyrus
2008	"Goodnight Goodnight"	Maroon 5
2008	"Party People"	Nelly featuring Fergie
2008	"Gives You Hell"	The All-American Rejects
2009	"21 Guns"	Green Day
2009	"Why Do You Let Me Stay Here?" (Version 2)	She and Him
2009	"21st Century Breakdown"	Green Day
2009	"(If You're Wondering If I Want You To) I Want You To"	Weezer
2010	"Last of the American Girls"	Green Day
2017	"Dusk Till Dawn"	Zayn featuring Sia

=== Editor videography ===
- MxPx – "Everything Sucks (When You're Gone)" (November 2003)
- Brand New – "Sic Transit Gloria.... Glory Fades" (December 2003)
