= Without a Fight =

Without a Fight may refer to:

- "Without a Fight" (song), a 2016 song by Brad Paisley, featuring Demi Lovato
- Without a Fight (horse), a Thoroughbred racehorse, winner of the 2023 Caulfield Cup and Melbourne Cup
- "Without a Fight", a song by Hoobastank from the album Every Man for Himself
