= Ready for You =

Ready for You may refer to:

- "Ready for You", a 2001 song by Hoobastank from Hoobastank
- "Ready for You", a 2005 song by Kutless from Strong Tower
- "Ready for You", a 2015 song by Years & Years from Communion
- "Ready for You", a 2017 song by Haim from Something to Tell You
- "Ready for Ya", a 2017 song by Demi Lovato from Tell Me You Love Me
