= So Close, So Far (song) =

Single by Hoobastank

from the album For(n)ever
- Released: January 27, 2009
- Recorded: 2008
- Genre: Post-grunge
- Length: 3:17
- Label: Island
- Songwriters: Jeff Blue; Dan Estrin; Doug Robb

Hoobastank singles chronology
"My Turn" (2008)	"So Close, So Far" (2009)	"The Letter" (2009)

Music video
- "So Close, So Far" on YouTube

"So Close, So Far" is the second single by the post-grunge band Hoobastank from their fourth studio album For(n)ever. In interviews, Doug Robb stated that he "wrote the song about the many men and women across the world fighting to keep peace and fighting for America. It's how I would feel if I was away from them fighting a war".

== Critical reception ==
The song received a positive review from Chuck Taylor of Billboard magazine:

"So Close, So Far" sounds like a better bet to return Hooba to the upper reaches of the charts: It's still credibly post-grunge, but a better display case for lead Doug Robb's fervid vocals, alongside plenty of howling guitars and pealing percussion. The track could take command of not only rock; it's catchy enough to seduce adult top 40, returning the California band to glory.

== Charts ==
Chart (2009)	Peak position
U.S. Billboard Hot Adult Top 40 Tracks	24

== Release history ==
Release dates and formats for "So Close, So Far"
Region	Date	Format	Label(s)	Ref.
United States	March 17, 2009	Mainstream airplay	Island	
