= Payable on Death =

Studio album by P.O.D.
- Released: November 4, 2003
- Recorded: May – July 2003
- Studios: Bay 7, Valley Village, California; Sparky Dark, Calabasas, California
- Genres: Christian metal; alternative metal; reggae rock; nu metal
- Length: 44:22
- Label: Atlantic
- Producers: Howard Benson, P.O.D.

P.O.D. chronology
| Satellite (2001) | Payable on Death (2003) | The Warriors EP, Volume 2 (2005) |

Singles from Payable on Death
- 1. "Will You" Released: September 22, 2003; 2. "Change the World" Released: January 16, 2004; 3. "Freedom Fighters (live) (iTunes exclusive)" Released: 2004

Payable on Death is the fifth studio album by Christian nu metal band P.O.D. It is the group's first album to feature guitarist Jason Truby following the controversial departure of Marcos Curiel, and their last album produced by Howard Benson (until Murdered Love in 2012). Payable on Death was released on November 4, 2003, through Atlantic and marks a notable de-emphasizing of the band's distinctive rap metal style. While a commercial disappointment compared to Satellite, it still managed to sell over 1,300,000 copies worldwide.

== Background and recording ==
Following the triple-platinum success of Satellite, P.O.D. enjoyed abundant radio, television, and concert success. However, on February 19, 2003, guitarist Marcos Curiel left the band under controversial circumstances, with contradictory reasons given from both parties. The remaining members expressed remorse in their friend's departure and considered disbanding until Jason Truby, former member of Christian metal band Living Sacrifice, assisted with the recording of "Sleeping Awake", from The Matrix Reloaded soundtrack. The alliance strengthened the band and allowed them to begin recording a new album in spring 2003.

Yearning for a fresh start, the group rented a practice space in San Diego and started jamming with no expectations and no deadlines. Vocalist Sonny Sandoval explained, "We took it back to the roots. We broke down the walls in this abandoned warehouse and set up shop. The doors were always open to our friends and family and people around San Diego to come through. And it was just more of a home vibe." According to bassist Traa Daniels, "It was innocent and it was natural and fun." Within the first month of recording, P.O.D. had an unprecedented 17 songs to work with. The group also decided on the title Payable on Death both to set the record straight regarding the band's initials and as a symbol of their rebirth.

Daniels stated the two rules in writing their fifth album as "to never have any boundaries musically" and "to be as organic as we could possibly be." The latter meant not relying on ProTools and instead using an "old school" approach to recording. Daniels also explained their desire to "just be a rock band. Period. Not a "nu metal" band, not any of these other categories and clichés that people have been trying to throw on us."

Guitarist Jason Truby expressed satisfaction with his participation in the songwriting process: "Everyone respects each other and they let me be me and also we understand that there are boundaries. You can't redefine P.O.D. and flip the whole page into some new band. It's just P.O.D. and everybody brings something to the pot and puts their ingredient in, which kept it P.O.D. instead of it turning into 'Okay, this is P.O.D. with Jason.'"

== Music and lyrics ==
On Payable on Death, the band chose to head in a more traditional metal sound than the previous album, Satellite. Traa Daniels noted in May 2003 that the album would deal with the upsetting departure of Curiel but that "a lot of these songs are coming out fun. We're not a downer band. We're not trying to get too deep." The sixth track, "Revolution", and the last track, "Eternal", feature Phil Keaggy. Jason Truby personally requested Keaggy's presence on "Eternal". The track features Truby playing acoustic rhythm alongside Keaggy's electric guitar on lead.

== Touring and promotion ==
Payable on Death did not venture heavily in the way of promotional singles. "Will You" served as its lead single which had an accompanying music video. Thematically, the song showcased a lesser known side of P.O.D. with a bitter love story in place of the band's typical spiritual and urban themes. "Change the World" would be the follow-up, but didn't manage to repeat the same level of success.

According to Sandoval, Metallica requested P.O.D. for the 2003 Summer Sanitarium Tour, but this conflicted with their recording schedule. They allegedly received many offers to tour at the beginning of 2004 and had hoped to join Metallica in January. P.O.D. played their first show with Jason Truby on August 30, 2003, in Morrison, Colorado and played various concerts for the remainder of the year, including the Voodoo Music Experience festival in New Orleans on Halloween. They also played at a Spike TV event in Las Vegas on December 2 and the KROQ Almost Acoustic Christmas concert.

In somewhat of a role reversal, P.O.D. co-headlined with Linkin Park on their Meteora US tour in early 2004. This marked their first US tour schedule with Truby. Following this, the band headlined their own theater tour of 40 cities beginning in May. Tour mates included Blindside, Lacuna Coil, and New Found Glory. P.O.D. were forced to cancel a May show in Columbus, Ohio, after Sandoval fell from the stage and bruised his ribs at a show a few days prior. They continued touring shortly after and performed at the Cornerstone Festival that summer. Two songs from the aforementioned concert would appear on the Warriors EP, Volume 2 the following year. P.O.D.'s tour schedule also included the Street Scene festival in August and ran until late 2004 when they began work on a follow-up album.

== Release ==
A few weeks after the official track listing was announced, the album's lead single was posted online for streaming in September 2003. The first million copies of Payable on Death included a bonus PlayStation 2 DVD. This features a 50-minute documentary titled "Inside P.O.D. Culture" as well as an exclusive demo level of the video game Amplitude. The level allows players to remix an exclusive P.O.D. song titled "Space", using its individual tracks. Also included is a key to a website that allowed fans to download "Space".

The additional material prompted the album's retail price to be slightly higher than average CDs and was viewed by New York Times writer Chris Nelson as "a testament to just how desperate music companies are to stoke consumer interest" in the face of free Internet music sharing.

=== DualDisc edition ===
Payable on Death was included among a group of 15 DualDisc releases that were test marketed in two cities: Boston and Seattle. The DualDisc has the standard album on one side, and bonus material on the second side.

The DualDisc version was later reissued in a more widely distributed version. The original test market version differs from this common version in both packaging elements and in the design of the back of the inlay card.

=== Cover art ===
The album cover was designed and painted by Latino artist Daniel Martin Diaz. While Daniel claims he is a devout Catholic, some Christians felt the cover was negatively symbolic, and in a move previously experienced with The Fundamental Elements of Southtown, 85% of Christian music stores refused to carry the album. In response, Sonny Sandoval stated that he "couldn't care less" and that the album was selling well regardless. Diaz was asked to compose the interior layout as well, which he completed in less than a week. All of these illustrations were taken from other paintings he created. When viewed in the original paintings, the symbolic meanings can be observed; most of the paintings contain Catholic imagery, combined with a fair amount of mysticism.

== Reception ==
=== Critical response ===
Professional ratings
Aggregate scores
| Source | Rating |
|---|---|
| Metacritic | 54/100 |
Review scores
| Source | Rating |
| AllMusic | 3/5 stars |
| Blender | 2/5 stars |
| Christianity Today | 3.5/5 stars |
| Cross Rhythms | 10/10 stars |
| Entertainment Weekly | C |
| Mojo | 3.5/5 stars |
| Q | 2/5 stars |
| Rolling Stone | 2/5 stars |
| Spin | (6/10) |

According to the review aggregator Metacritic, Payable on Death received "mixed or average reviews" based on a weighted average score of 54 out of 100 from 7 critic scores. Truby's guitar style gained much attention and was considered more technical and somewhat heavier than that of Curiel's. AllMusic's Matt Collar considered it a "darker album than its predecessor" and found that "Truby unfortunately lacks some of the unexpected spark that Marcos brought to P.O.D. Fans of the band shouldn't find much to complain about here though, even if the overall sound doesn't stand out as distinctly from the nu-metal pack as Satellite did." Neil Drumming of Entertainment Weekly gave a largely scathing review of the album, stating, "On track after formulaic track, perfunctory verses rush into roaring refrains of compressed guitar arrrgh and charmless didacticism." This negativity was largely mirrored by reviews in Blender and Rolling Stone.

=== Commercial success ===
Having sold 106,000 copies in its first week, Payable on Death debuted at No. 9 on the Billboard 200 chart on the strength of the first single and music video for "Will You". The band filmed a video for the next single, "Change the World", but it was never shipped to MTV. However, it did air on the lesser known Fuse TV. The album's relatively poor sales compared to P.O.D.'s mammoth success, Satellite, have been partly attributed to a shakeup at Atlantic Records, leaving P.O.D. with no label support. Atlantic was sold to a private investor resulting in several thousand people, many of whom close to P.O.D., losing their jobs.

According to Soundscan, Payable on Death sold a little under 500,000 copies as of January 2006. However, it has shipped over 500,000 copies in the U.S.; therefore, Payable on Death was certified gold by the RIAA. Not until June 2004 did it pass the one-million sales mark. It has sold over 1,300,000 copies worldwide. It is credited as the last commercially successful album released by P.O.D.

== Track listing ==
All tracks are written by P.O.D..

| No. | Title | Length |
|---|---|---|
| 1. | "Wildfire" | 3:15 |
| 2. | "Will You" | 3:47 |
| 3. | "Change the World" | 3:03 |
| 4. | "Execute the Sounds" | 3:01 |
| 5. | "Find My Way" | 3:09 |
| 6. | "Revolution" (featuring Phil Keaggy) | 3:25 |
| 7. | "The Reasons" | 3:44 |
| 8. | "Freedom Fighters" | 4:12 |
| 9. | "Waiting on Today" | 3:06 |
| 10. | "I and Identify" | 3:15 |
| 11. | "Asthma" | 4:01 |
| 12. | "Eternal" (featuring Phil Keaggy) | 6:19 |
| Total length: | | 44:22 |

Japanese version bonus tracks
| No. | Title | Length |
|---|---|---|
| 13. | "Sleeping Awake" | 3:23 |
| 14. | "Space (The Phatheads Remix)" | 4:49 |
| Total length: | | 52:34 |

Enhanced CD content

- Bonus Video footage
- Link to download "Space"

Limited edition bonus disc for PlayStation 2

- "Amplitude Demo"
- "Inside P.O.D. Culture"
- "Daniel Martin Diaz Featurette"

== Personnel ==
P.O.D.

- Sonny Sandoval – lead vocals
- Jason Truby – guitar, backing vocals
- Traa Daniels – bass, backing vocals
- Wuv Bernardo – drums, backing vocals

Production

- Rich Costey – mixing at Cello Studios, Hollywood, California
- Mike Plotnikoff – engineering, Pro-Tools editing, mixing on "Eternal" at Bay 7 Studios, Valley Village, California
- Tom Baker – mastering at Precision Mastering, Hollywood, California
- Eric Miller – additional engineering
- Darren Mora – assistant mix engineering
- Paul DeCarli and Dan Adam – Pro-Tools editing

Additional musicians

- Phil Keaggy – additional guitars on "Revolution" and "Eternal"

Artwork

- Christina Dittmar – Atlantic Records art director
- Daniel Martin Diaz – art direction, design, paintings and sketches
- Ellie Leacock (Art Stuff) – additional layout
- Charles Peterson – photography

== Charts ==
Weekly chart performance for Payable on Death
| Chart (2003) | Peak position |
|---|---|
| Australian Albums (ARIA) | 47 |
| Austrian Albums (Ö3 Austria) | 47 |
| French Albums (SNEP) | 109 |
| German Albums (Offizielle Top 100) | 30 |
| Italian Albums (FIMI) | 64 |
| New Zealand Albums (RMNZ) | 34 |
| Scottish Albums (Official Charts) | 16 |
| Swedish Albums (Sverigetopplistan) | 45 |
| Swiss Albums (Schweizer Hitparade) | 31 |
| US Billboard 200 | 9 |
| US Top Christian Albums (Billboard) | 1 |

== Certifications ==
Certifications and sales for Payable on Death
| Region | Certification | Certified units/sales |
|---|---|---|
| United States (RIAA) | Gold | 500,000^{^} |
^{^} Shipments figures based on certification alone.
