= The Letter (Hoobastank song) =

Single by Hoobastank featuring Vanessa Amorosi

from the album Fornever
- Released: June 19, 2009
- Recorded: 2008
- Genre: Alternative rock; post-grunge; emo
- Length: 4:00
- Label: Island Def Jam
- Songwriters: Chris Hesse; Daniel Estrin; Doug Robb
- Producer: Howard Benson

Hoobastank singles chronology
"So Close, So Far" (2009)	"The Letter" (2009)	"This Is Gonna Hurt" (2012)

Vanessa Amorosi singles chronology
"The Simple Things (Something Emotional)" (2008)	"The Letter" (2009)	"This Is Who I Am" (2009)

Music video
- "The Letter" on YouTube

"The Letter" is the third single by the American rock band Hoobastank from their fourth studio album, Fornever (2009), released in the United States on January 27, 2009, and on June 19, 2009, in Australia. It is a duet version with Melbourne-based singer Vanessa Amorosi. Hoobastank singer Doug Robb said they want to release "The Letter" in many countries with different female artists. A video for "The Letter", featuring Amorosi, was shot in April 2009 by Grammy nominated director Paul Brown, also featured Jesse Charland as the bassist who eventually became an official member that year.

== History ==
Doug Robb, commented about working with Amorosi, "We were all very excited about how the song 'The Letter' turned out with Vanessa singing on it. She brought a haunting yet powerful quality to the song that we think sounds great. The video was a blast to make as well. She rounded out the story perfectly and I finally got to trash a room. This is one of my favourite videos of ours so far. It looks amazing".

The song and the video went to Australasian media on May 4, 2009. "The Letter" is available for purchase on iTunes since June 5 and the single was released in Australia on June 19, 2009. It debuted at number 44 and peaked at number 39 on the Australian Singles Chart.

Another duet version of the song was released in Japan by Universal International on 5 August 2009 with Japanese singer, lyricist and actress Anna Tsuchiya. "The Letter" featuring Anna Tsuchiya appears on Hoobastank's greatest hits album The Greatest Hits: Don't Touch My Moustache (deluxe edition).

The song is about a bitter relationship where one partner starts to cheat on the other, the obvious sign being a letter from the partner's other lover.

The B-side is incorrectly labelled as "Stay With Me", when, in fact, it's ""Replace You".

== Track listing ==
CD single

#	"The Letter"	Time
1.	"The Letter" (Australasian version – featuring Vanessa Amorosi)	04:00
2.	"Stay With Me"	04:07

== Charts ==
Chart (2009)	Peak position
Australia (ARIA)	39
