= Change the World (P.O.D. song) =

Single by P.O.D.

from the album Payable on Death
- Released: February 2004 (rock radio)
- Recorded: 2003
- Genre: Christian metal, nu metal
- Length: 3:03
- Label: Atlantic
- Songwriters: Noah Bernardo, Traa Daniels, Sonny Sandoval, Jason Truby
- Producer: Howard Benson

P.O.D. singles chronology
"Will You" (2003)	"Change the World" (2004)	"Freedom Fighters" (2004)

Music video
- "Change the World" on YouTube

Change the World is a song by American Christian metal band P.O.D. It was released in February 2004 as the second single from their third major label studio album, Payable on Death. Vocalist Sonny Sandoval described the track as a "good-feeling song" and explained simply that "the song says you can change the world with love. It speaks for itself."

== Music video ==
The video for "Change the World" was directed by Marc Webb, who also directed P.O.D.'s previous three videos. Webb filmed in over 40 different countries to convey the song's message of global peace. Sandoval, who described it as a "serious video" that would "connect," explained the director's shooting process in a December 2003 interview:

He's just traveling around the world ... from Egypt to Israel to Japan, New Zealand ... He's going to run up to somebody on the streets of Jerusalem and [give them a sign to hold] that says, 'Change,' and the next person will be 'The World,' so he's getting a whole global concept. And we did individual shoots from the mountains to the ocean.

The video was never shipped to MTV due to a shake-up at Atlantic Records which left the band with no label support. It did air on Fuse TV however.

== Charts ==
Chart (2004)	Peak position
US Mainstream Rock (Billboard)	32
US Alternative Airplay (Billboard)	38
