= Disappear (Hoobastank song) =

2004 single by Hoobastank

Single by Hoobastank

from the album The Reason
- Released: October 18, 2004
- Studio: Bay 7 (Valley Village, Los Angeles); Sparky Dark (Calabasas, California)
- Genre: Rock; post-grunge
- Length: 5:08 (album version); 4:00 (radio edit)
- Label: Island
- Composer: Daniel Estrin
- Lyricist: Douglas Robb
- Producer: Howard Benson

Hoobastank singles chronology
"Same Direction" (2004)	"Disappear" (2004)	"If I Were You" (2006)

Music video
- "Disappear" on YouTube

"Disappear" is the fourth and final single from the American rock band Hoobastank's second studio album, The Reason (2003). Released as a single on October 18, 2004, "Disappear" reached number 24 on the US Billboard Modern Rock Tracks chart.

== Music video ==
The music video for "Disappear" switches between footage from live Hoobastank shows during their 2004 tour (supporting the release of The Reason), and footage of them performing the song at the Utah State Fairgrounds, in Salt Lake City during a local radio station's music festival. The video was directed by Marc Webb and produced by Hagai Shaham. It is the last music video to feature bassist Markku Lappalainen as he left the band after Hoobastank's 2005 Summer Tour.

== Track listing ==
European and Australian CD single

1. "Disappear" (radio edit) – 4:07
2. "Same Direction" (acoustic version) – 3:29
3. "Just One" (album version) – 3:19
4. "Disappear" (video)

== Credits and personnel ==
Credits are lifted from the European CD single liner notes and The Reason album booklet.

Studios

- Recorded at Bay 7 Studios (Valley Village, Los Angeles) and Sparky Dark Studios (Calabasas, California)
- Strings recorded at Capitol Studios (Hollywood, California)
- Mixed at Image Recording (Hollywood, California)
- Mastered at Precision Mastering (Los Angeles)

Personnel

- Daniel Estrin – music, guitar
- Douglas Robb – lyrics, vocals
- Markku Lappalainen – bass
- Chris Hesse – drums
- Howard Benson – production
- Mike Plotnikoff – recording
- Casey Stone – recording (strings)
- Chris Lord-Alge – mixing
- Deborah Lurie – string arrangement
- Tom Baker – mastering

== Charts ==
=== Weekly charts ===
Chart (2004–2005)	Peak position
Austria (Ö3 Austria Top 40)	75
Canada CHR/Pop Top 30 (Radio & Records)	28
Germany (GfK)	99
US Bubbling Under Hot 100 (Billboard)	1
US Adult Pop Airplay (Billboard)	16
US Alternative Airplay (Billboard)	24
US Pop Airplay (Billboard)	30

=== Year-end charts ===
Chart (2005)	Position
US Adult Top 40 (Billboard)	55

== Release history ==
Region	Date	Format(s)	Label(s)	Ref.
United States	October 18, 2004	Contemporary hit; hot AC; active rock; alternative radio	Island	
Australia	January 31, 2005	CD	Island	
