= Will You (P.O.D. song) =

Single by P.O.D.

from the album Payable on Death
- Released: September 22, 2003 (rock radio); December 2003 (pop radio)
- Recorded: 2003
- Genre: Alternative metal
- Length: 3:47
- Label: Atlantic
- Songwriters: Noah Bernardo, Traa Daniels, Sonny Sandoval, Jason Truby
- Producer: Howard Benson

P.O.D. singles chronology
"Sleeping Awake" (2003)	"Will You" (2003)	"Change the World" (2004)

Music video
- "Will You" on YouTube

"Will You" is a song by American Christian metal band P.O.D. and the lead single from their fifth studio album, Payable on Death. Released on September 22, 2003, the song charted at No. 17 on the Bubbling Under Hot 100 chart on December 2 that year.

== Composition ==
The band chose "Will You" as a lead single to demonstrate a new side both lyrically and musically as noted by MTV's Jon Wiederhorn:

"The surging rhythm and audible tension are instantly familiar, as is the bottom-heavy groove laid down by bassist Traa and drummer Wuv, but the technical guitar fills and rap-free vocals of Sonny Sandoval give the band a new vibe."

"Will You" features lyrics of anxiety and desperation amidst a turbulent and potentially crumbling relationship. Sandoval explained the song's nature in an interview:

"We always said we wanted to do something like that, but it just kinda turned darker than your average 'I love you' type of song. It's about sticking with the one you love and putting up with that person and being there through thick and thin."

== Music video ==
Shot in September 2003 in Los Angeles, the music video was directed by Marc Webb who also directed P.O.D.'s previous video. "Will You" carries the Christian message of turning the other cheek and deals with the problems faced by four adolescents with little in common. A young preppy girl is pressured into sex before being comforted by a punk rock girl; an interracial couple is harassed at a party; and a youth deals with an alcoholic mother. This is accompanied by sped-up footage of P.O.D. performing the song in a vacant lot.

== Track listing ==
1. "Will You (Album version)" - 3:48
2. "Will You (Chris Vrenna remix)" - 3:54
3. "Cain (Instrumental)" - 6:10

== Official versions ==
- "Will You" 3:47
- "Will You (Video/Radio Edit)" 3:44
- "Will You (Chris Vrenna Remix)" 3:56
- "Will You (Tommie Sunshine New Mix)" 6:27
- "Will You (Tommie Sunshine Original Remix) "5:37
- "Will You (Tommie Sunshine Special Original Gigolo Instrumental)" 5:37
- "Will You (Tommie Sunshine Forever Remix)" 5:09

== Charts ==
Chart performance for "Will You"
Chart (2003–2004)	Peak position
Australia (ARIA)	61
Switzerland (Schweizer Hitparade)	68
UK Singles (Official Charts)	68
US Billboard Mainstream Rock Tracks	12
US Billboard Modern Rock Tracks	12
