= Sleeping Awake =

Single by P.O.D.

from the album The Matrix Reloaded: The Album and Payable on Death (Japanese version)
- Released: May 26, 2003
- Recorded: 2003
- Genre: Alternative metal, nu metal
- Length: 3:23
- Label: Warner, Atlantic
- Songwriters: Noah Bernardo, Traa Daniels, Sonny Sandoval
- Producers: Howard Benson, P.O.D.

P.O.D. singles chronology
"Satellite" (2002)	"Sleeping Awake" (2003)	"Will You" (2003)

Music video
- "Sleeping Awake" on YouTube

"Sleeping Awake" (also known as "Sleeping Away") is the lead single by P.O.D. from The Matrix Reloaded: The Album. The film soundtrack was released on May 6, 2003 by Warner Bros. Records/Maverick Records with the single itself available May 26. The US edition only includes the title track while the UK/Australia edition, released June 3, includes the video and two more songs.

"Sleeping Awake" was later released as a bonus track on P.O.D.'s studio album, Payable on Death.

The song's video and lyrics are directly inspired by The Matrix Reloaded. The chorus features the line "dreaming of Zion awake", which refers to the last human city of planet Earth as depicted in the film.

== Video ==
The "Sleeping Awake" radio single, which began playing April 5, and Marc Webb-directed music video garnered significant airplay upon release.

The video shows two versions of the band performing the song. In one room, the band is performing while dressed entirely in black with sunglasses, similar to characters in the Matrix films. This room is a representation of the computer virtual reality, known as the Matrix from the film trilogy. Vocalist Sonny Sandoval is shown demonstrating abilities often used in the film by individuals who are aware of the nature of the Matrix, particularly the character Neo (the ability to warp the reality of the Matrix) to move objects via computerized telekinesis, in this case alphabet nursery blocks and form the word "ONE" from the word "NEO." (Neo is the central character in the Matrix films). The second room is a representation of the "real world" outside of The Matrix, and the band in this room are dressed in similar fashion to the Zionites in the Trilogy, garbed in old, and dirty clothes, although the level of degradation in the garments worn by the Zionites in the film is significantly more apparent than those worn by the band members in the music video. The two realities are shown to be mirror-images of each other, positioned and moving in the same manner as each other - the band in the Matrix are playing their instruments left-handed to further touch on the theme. At the video's end, the song's final note shatters the glass separating the two rooms, thus allowing the two bands to see each other.

"Sleeping Awake" marked the P.O.D. video debut of guitarist Jason Truby. During shooting of the video, Sandoval confessed that while the band had seriously considered breaking up after the departure of Marcos Curiel (who later rejoined the band), "[Jason] did us a favor by helping us out with this song, and then once it was all said and done it kind of confirmed that maybe we should keep doing what we loved—and that's making music ... So now he's helping us do that."

== Track listing ==
=== US edition ===
1. Sleeping Awake

=== UK/Australia edition ===
1. "Sleeping Awake" by P.O.D.
2. "Bruises" (Album version) by Ünloco
3. "The Passportal" (Album version) by Team Sleep

- "Sleeping Awake" (Video)

== Charts ==
Chart performance for "Sleeping Awake"
Chart (2003)	Peak position
Australia (ARIA)	41
France (SNEP)	91
Germany (GfK)	55
Italy (FIMI)	35
Switzerland (Schweizer Hitparade)	30
UK Singles (Official Charts)	42
US Billboard Mainstream Rock Tracks	20
US Billboard Modern Rock Tracks	14
