= Out of Control (Hoobastank song) =

Single by Hoobastank

from the album The Reason
- Released: November 4, 2003
- Genre: Post-grunge; alternative rock; alternative metal
- Length: 2:42
- Label: Island
- Songwriters: Dan Estrin; Chris Hesse; Markku Lappalainen; Doug Robb
- Producer: Howard Benson

Hoobastank singles chronology
"Remember Me" (2002)	"Out of Control" (2003)	"The Reason" (2004)

Music video
- "Out of Control" on YouTube

"Out of Control" is a song by the American rock band Hoobastank, released as the lead single from their second studio album, The Reason (2003). It charted at No. 16 on the US Hot Mainstream Rock Tracks chart and at No. 9 on the US Hot Modern Rock Tracks chart.

The song features guest vocals from Lostprophets' frontman Ian Watkins and turntablist Jamie Oliver.

== Music video ==
The music video was directed by Nathan Cox. It features the group entering a club and performing to dizzying camera shots as crowds cheer them on.

== Charts ==
=== Weekly charts ===
Chart (2003–2004)	Peak position
US Alternative Airplay (Billboard)	9
US Mainstream Rock (Billboard)	16

=== Year-end charts ===
Chart (2004)	Position
US Modern Rock Tracks (Billboard)	57
