= Push Pull (Hoobastank album) =

Studio album by Hoobastank
- Released: May 25, 2018
- Recorded: 2017
- Genre: Pop rock; funk rock
- Length: 41:01
- Label: Napalm
- Producer: Matt Wallace

Hoobastank chronology
Fight or Flight (2012)	Push Pull (2018)

Singles from Push Pull
- 1. "More Beautiful" Released: April 4, 2018

Professional ratings
Review scores
Source	Rating
AllMusic	3.5/5 stars

Push Pull is the sixth studio album by American rock band Hoobastank, released on May 25, 2018, by Napalm Records. The album features a more pop rock sound with funk rock influences, different from the characteristic post-grunge and alternative style of the band.

The album peaked at number 35 on Billboard's Independent Albums chart.

== Track listing ==
All tracks are written by Douglas Robb, Daniel Estrin, Chris Hesse and Jesse Charland, except where noted.

No.	Title	Writer(s)	Length
1.	"Don't Look Away"		3:29
2.	"Push Pull"		3:08
3.	"More Beautiful"		3:53
4.	"Head over Heels" (Tears for Fears cover)	Roland Orzabal; Curt Smith	3:58
5.	"True Believer"		3:21
6.	"Just Let Go (Who Cares If We Fall)"		2:58
7.	"Better Left Unsaid"		3:34
8.	"We Don't Need the World"		3:56
9.	"Buzzkill (Before You Say Goodbye)"		3:58
10.	"Fallen Star"		4:21
11.	"There Will Never Be Another One"		4:25
Total length:			41:01

== Personnel ==
Hoobastank

- Doug Robb – lead vocals, rhythm guitar
- Daniel Estrin – lead guitar
- Chris Hesse – drums
- Jesse Charland – bass, backing vocals

Production

- Matt Wallace – production
- Paul David Hager – mixing
- Chris Hesse – mixing
- Emily Lazar – mastering

== Charts ==
Chart performance for Push Pull
Chart (2018)	Peak position
US Independent Albums (Billboard)	35
