= Inside of You (Hoobastank song) =

Single by Hoobastank

from the album Every Man for Himself
- Released: May 26, 2006
- Genre: Hard rock; post-grunge
- Length: 3:08
- Label: Island
- Songwriters: Doug Robb, Dan Estrin, Chris Hesse

Hoobastank singles chronology
"If I Were You" (2006)	"Inside of You" (2006)	"Born to Lead" (2006)

Music video
- "Inside of You" on YouTube

"Inside of You" is the second single released from the American rock band Hoobastank's third studio album, Every Man for Himself. The song reached number 27 on the Billboard Alternative Songs chart.

== Description ==
The song begins with a short electronic beat, followed by the main guitar riff. Lyrically, the song contains clear sexual references, while evading profanity. The music video for the song, directed by Lex Halaby, contains a well representation of the lyrics. The video shows the band behind various "peep shows", and showing attractive women watching with pleasure.

== Rihanna version ==
Hoobastank recorded an unreleased version of "Inside of You" with the singer Rihanna. Both artists were on Island Def Jam at the time, and the label requested that the band potentially feature a "new artist" on the album; at the time, Rihanna had only released her debut album Music of the Sun and none of the band members were aware of her. The band ultimately decided not to use the Rihanna version for the album. In 2023, Doug Robb said it was a "stunning lack of vision to see what a star Rihanna was going to be." Robb believed that the band should have written the song specifically with a collaboration in mind instead of altering the preexisting arrangement to accompany Rihanna's guest vocals.

== Chart performance ==
Chart (2006)	Peak position
U.S. Alternative Songs	27
