= If I Were You (Hoobastank song) =

Single by Hoobastank

from the album Every Man for Himself
- Released: March 7, 2006
- Genre: Pop rock
- Length: 4:05
- Label: Island
- Songwriters: Dan Estrin, Chris Hesse, Doug Robb

Hoobastank singles chronology
"Disappear" (2004)	"If I Were You" (2006)	"Inside of You" (2006)

Music video
- "If I Were You" on YouTube

"If I Were You" is the first single released from Hoobastank's third studio album, Every Man for Himself. The song reached number 23 on the Modern Rock chart.

== Music video ==
A music video directed by Hype Williams was released for the song and is shot in black and white. It is the first music video without Markku Lappalainen on bass guitar, leaving Josh Moreau as the stand-in member.

== Chart performance ==
Chart (2006)	Peak position
US Modern Rock Tracks	23
US Pop Airplay (Billboard)	40
US Adult Pop Airplay	18
US Pop 100	94
Austrian Singles Chart	60
German Singles Chart	58
Italian Singles Chart	45
Swiss Singles Chart	100
US Pop Songs (Billboard)	40

== Release history ==
Release dates and formats for "If I Were You"
Region	Date	Format	Label(s)	Ref.
United States	March 7, 2006	Mainstream airplay	Island	
