= Cobalt Cafe =

Former music venue in Canoga Park, California, US

Coordinates: 34°12′4″N 118°36′27″W

The Cobalt Cafe was an all-ages music venue in Canoga Park, California. Although the venue always hosted touring artists, it was most known for hosting rock concerts featuring bands local to the Los Angeles area, typically punk, heavy metal, and alternative. The Cobalt, a relatively small venue in the suburban San Fernando Valley, hosted an unusually high number of bands that later established successful careers, including AFI, Less Than Jake, Link 80, Avenged Sevenfold, California Redemption, and Valley locals Strung Out, Second Rate, Linkin Park, Hoobastank, and Incubus. With much of the area's music scene centered in other areas (such as Hollywood and Downtown Los Angeles), the Cobalt was among the primary musical, artistic, and cultural centers of the San Fernando Valley.

== History ==
The Cobalt Cafe was founded by Dave Politi in January 1991. One of the first cafe venues in the sleepy San Fernando Valley, the Cobalt was fashioned after coffee houses featuring live music and poetry more widespread in San Francisco. The Cobalt was originally located on Ventura Boulevard in Woodland Hills where it remained for three years. During this period, Cobalt performances typically included acoustic music, weekly poetry readings, and an open mic night. A cultural oddity in the area, the venue attracted visits from people such as Mick Taylor from the Rolling Stones. Performances ranged from a David Becker Tribune concert to poetry readings from Angelo of Fishbone.

On January 14, 1994, just three days before the Valley-centered Northridge earthquake, the Cobalt moved to a new location in Canoga Park. The Cobalt was most known as a rock venue, having become a regular tour stop for underground and up-and-coming touring artists, including many signed to indie and major labels. Additionally, the Cobalt hosted events including open mics, poetry reading, and a non-denominational youth worship group. The Cobalt was also home to several paintings and murals, with all of the art on display the work of local artists, including many from the San Fernando Valley.

In December 2014, the Cobalt announced plans to close at the end of the year. The announcement cited financial concerns as well as the health of Politi, the Cobalt's owner for its 23-year history. The venue hosted a final concert on December 29 of that year with local rock band The Lifted playing the final set, and a final Cobalt Poets reading the following night, led by longtime host Rick Lupert.

While the Cobalt's announcement that it was closing left open the possibility of reopening in the future, possibly with new ownership, the venue remains closed.

After being dormant nearly six years, the Cobalt Poets group returned for online readings in August 2020. This occurred as the COVID-19 pandemic in the United States made videotelephony software like Zoom a normalized platform for social relations. In 2021, under the banner "The Cobalt Presents," founder Dave Politi, alongside Brian Lacy a long time Cobalt alumni and of the underground music site, Audioeclectica.com and initially Jasan Radford of Onesidezero, began promoting live music showcases again. These events, featuring original music from primarily teenage and young adult bands, were held at venues including Hotel Ziggy in West Hollywood, Bar10 in Tarzana, The Whisky A Go Go, and others.
