= Fornever =

For(N)ever

Studio album by Hoobastank
- Released: January 27, 2009
- Studios: Bay 7 (Valley Village); Henson (Hollywood, California); Sparky Dark (Calabasas)
- Genres: Alternative rock; post-grunge
- Length: 38:35
- Label: Island
- Producer: Howard Benson

Hoobastank chronology
Every Man for Himself (2006)	For(N)ever (2009)	Is This the Day? (2010)

Singles from Fornever
- 1. "My Turn" Released: October 14, 2008; 2. "So Close, So Far" Released: January 27, 2009; 3. "The Letter" Released: June 19, 2009

Fornever (stylized as For(N)ever) is the fourth studio album by the American rock band Hoobastank, released on January 27, 2009. It is their last album released on Island Records. Upon its release, the album peaked at number 26 on the US Billboard 200.

== Pre-release ==
In October 2007, Doug Robb posted on the official Hoobastank message boards and said that they had "Set the bar very very high for this next CD," and that they had "More ideas going into this CD than ever before."

On June 2, 2008, Robb posted an update on their temporary website, announcing that the recording process of their album was almost done and to expect a release date within a couple of weeks.

== Critical reception ==
Professional ratings
Aggregate scores
Source	Rating
Metacritic	(51/100)
Review scores
Source	Rating
AllMusic	3/5 stars
Blender	2/5 stars
Boston Globe	(favorable)
Consequence of Sound	F
NOW	1/5 stars

Fornever garnered mixed reviews from music critics. At Metacritic, which assigns a normalized rating out of 100 to reviews from mainstream critics, it received an average score of 51, based on 4 reviews.

AllMusic's Stephen Thomas Erlewine commended Hoobastank for moving away from the modern rock mechanics to craft a relationship record with sincerity and empathy for its subject matter, concluding that "Prior to this, they seemed more concerned with airplay than emotion, so it's nice to see their human side slip through even if it isn't particularly pleasant to hear." Scott McLennan of the Boston Globe was favorable towards the band for sticking to what made them successful in previous efforts, saying "[F]ormulaic though the album may be, the band musters enough craft and personality to keep it afloat. The band is at its best when mixing pop melancholy with strident guitar rock." Jon Dolan, writing for Blender, criticized the band for attempting to recreate the grunge sound by utilizing their standard musicianship formula ("the sturdy A/B rhyme, the grandly surging chorus, the self-actualized underdog salvo"), concluding that "Album four is especially monochrome gut-check metal, so flourishes of mellow pianos or cargo-shorts funk are as welcome as a bag of Skittles in a pack of combat rations. Even Kurt knew that soldiers need some sweets." Jordan Bimm of NOW heavily panned the album, saying "[T]heir un-evolved post-grunge alt-rock is just another shitty sonic time capsule from 1998. All 11 tracks feature painfully predictable song structures and lethargic chord progressions devoid of anything resembling a hook."

== Track listing ==
All tracks are written by Hoobastank except where noted

No.	Title	Writer(s)	Length
1.	"My Turn"	Hoobastank, Tom Robb	3:09
2.	"I Don't Think I Love You"		3:39
3.	"So Close, So Far"	Hoobastank, Jeff Blue	3:14
4.	"All About You"		2:55
5.	"The Letter" (Duet with Vanessa Amorosi featured in Australian and European versions)		3:54
6.	"Tears of Yesterday"		3:56
7.	"Sick of Hanging On"		3:13
8.	"You're the One"		3:55
9.	"Who the Hell Am I?"		3:59
10.	"You Need to be Here"		3:01
11.	"Gone Gone Gone"		3:36
Total length:			38:31

Japanese and digital reissue bonus tracks
No.	Title	Length
12.	"Replace You"	4:20
13.	"Stay With Me"	4:07
Total length:		8:27

== Personnel ==
Hoobastank

- Doug Robb — vocals, rhythm guitar
- Dan Estrin — lead guitar, keyboards
- Chris Hesse — drums, percussion

Additional musicians

- Vanessa Amorosi — vocals for The Letter (Australian and European versions)
- David Campbell — string arrangements for Tears of Yesterday
- Howard Benson — keyboards, programming
- Paul Bushnell — bass

Production

- Stephen Ferrera — A&R
- Howard Benson — audio production, producer, programming
- Keith Armstrong, Mikey Canzonetta — mixing assistants
- Paul DeCarli — digital editing
- Chris Lord-Alge — mixing
- Mike Plotnikoff — engineer, mixing
- Todd Russell — art direction
- Leah Smith — stylist
- Tom Syrowski, Hatsukazu "Hatch" Inagaki — assistant engineers, audio engineers
- Marc VanGool — guitar technician

== Charts ==
Chart (2009)	Peak position
Australian Albums (ARIA)	88
Japanese Albums (Oricon)	6
US Billboard 200	26

== Release history ==
Region	Date	Catalog #
United States	January 27, 2009	1239902
Japan	January 28, 2009	CD:UICL-1081; CD+DVD:UICL-9070
Australia	June 26, 2009	2708708
France	March 3, 2009	
