= Same Direction =

Single by Hoobastank

from the album The Reason
- B-side: "Never There"
- Released: October 5, 2004
- Genre: Hard rock; post-grunge
- Length: 3:15
- Label: Island
- Songwriters: Dan Estrin; Chris Hesse; Markku Lappalainen; Doug Robb
- Producer: Howard Benson

Hoobastank singles chronology
"The Reason" (2004)	"Same Direction" (2004)	"Disappear" (2004)

Music video
- "Same Direction" on YouTube

"Same Direction" is the third single from the American rock band Hoobastank's second major studio album The Reason. It was released as a single in 2004, a couple of months after the release of "The Reason" as a single. "Same Direction" reached No. 20 on the Billboard Hot Mainstream Rock Tracks chart and No. 14 on the Hot Modern Rock Tracks chart.

== Music video ==
The music video for the song was directed by Brett Simon, and is both a prequel and a sequel to the video for "The Reason". The video starts almost immediately after the end of "The Reason", with the band fleeing the police because of the heist seen in the previous video, with everybody arrested except for lead singer Doug Robb and guitarist Dan Estrin. The video alternates between the past and present. The owner of the robbed pawn shop from the previous video is revealed to be a cop who has been following the band, and seems to be interrogating Robb. Numerous flashbacks show auditions for the band's lead singer (including cameos by Chester Bennington of Linkin Park, Kanye West, and Joel Madden of Good Charlotte), until Robb impresses the band. The band manages to then evade police numerous times. In a plot twist, it is revealed that Robb was actually an undercover cop, with full knowledge that the band was planning the heist, that his "interrogation" was actually him being assigned to join the band, and that he knew when the police were going to find their hideout. At the video's end, Robb apprehends Estrin, who realizes that he set them up, during their supposed escape, and then shows the rest of the band also in custody.

== Charts ==
=== Weekly charts ===
Weekly chart performance for "Same Direction"
Chart (2004)	Peak position
Germany (GfK)	49
US Alternative Airplay (Billboard)	14
US Mainstream Rock (Billboard)	20

=== Year-end charts ===
Year-end chart performance for "Same Direction"
Chart (2004)	Position
US Modern Rock Tracks (Billboard)	71
