= The Reason (Hoobastank album) =

Studio album by Hoobastank
- Released: December 9, 2003
- Recorded: March–August 2003
- Studio: Bay 7 (Valley Village, Los Angeles); Sparky Dark (Calabasas, California)
- Genre: Alternative rock; post-grunge; pop rock; alternative metal
- Length: 41:54
- Label: Island
- Producer: Howard Benson

Hoobastank chronology
Hoobastank (2001)	The Reason (2003)	Every Man for Himself (2006)

Singles from The Reason
- 1. "Out of Control" Released: November 4, 2003; 2. "The Reason" Released: January 26, 2004; 3. "Same Direction" Released: October 5, 2004; 4. "Disappear" Released: October 18, 2004

The Reason is the second studio album by American rock band Hoobastank, released on December 9, 2003 by Island Records. Produced by Howard Benson, it was the band's last album to feature bassist Markku Lappaleinen prior to his departure in 2005.

Despite receiving mixed reviews from critics, The Reason peaked at number three on the US Billboard 200 and was eventually certified double platinum by the Recording Industry Association of America; currently, it has sold over 2.3 million copies in the United States alone. Four singles were released from the album: "Out of Control", the title track, "Same Direction", and "Disappear".

== Writing and recording ==
The band entered the studio in 2003 with producer Howard Benson, who has produced records by P.O.D., Cold and the Crystal Method. However, recording was disrupted for a month when guitarist Dan Estrin was seriously injured in a minibike accident in August. Estrin had recovered by October and the band headed off on a Nokia Unwired Tour with the All-American Rejects and Ozomatli in November.

Lyricist and vocalist Doug Robb said in a biography on the band's website that several songs on the album are about questioning what you are told. "A lot of it is about asking questions or questioning all that people see. It's not all about religion. "Out of Control" is about that and about opening your eyes after being blinded by being devoted to anything".

Prior to the beginning of the recording process, the band had befriended the Welsh band Lostprophets as the two bands shared a recording space in Calabasas. Ian Watkins and Jamie Oliver recorded a guest appearance for the chorus on "Out of Control".

== Release ==
=== Critical reception ===
Professional ratings
Review scores
Source	Rating
AllMusic	3/5 stars
ARTISTdirect	3/5 stars
Entertainment Weekly	C
Rolling Stone	2/5 stars

The Reason received mixed reviews from critics. Johnny Loftus of AllMusic found the album's teenage poetry and soft-sounding instrumentation too similar to the band's self-titled debut, but found their musicianship more expertly done, concluding that "In the end, The Reason is really a better version of Hoobastank, written and played by more mature versions of Hoobastank." Christian Hoard of Rolling Stone saw promise in the album's opener "Same Direction" but felt it was dragged down by middling sentiment and angst, saying that "Fugazi-esque guitars and memorable melodies occasionally poke through on The Reason's overbearing attack, reminding you of Hoobastank's promise." Jim Farber of Entertainment Weekly credited Hoobastank for crafting a radio-ready Incubus album but concluded that "they're still just a crummy Hydrox answer to Incubus' creamy Oreo."

=== Commercial performance ===
The first single "Out of Control" was featured on MX Unleashed, and made available for download on the band's website. The song would reach number nine on the U.S. modern rock chart, and number sixteen on the mainstream rock chart. The Reason eventually reached a peak of number three on the Billboard 200, making it the band's highest-charting album in the United States.

The title track was released as a single in the first half of 2004. It became a massive hit worldwide, reaching number two on the Billboard Hot 100, number one on the U.S. and world modern rock charts and number seven in Australia. The song's success pushed the album back into the charts, reaching number three on the Billboard 200. The Reason was also the twenty-fourth best-selling album of 2004.

== In popular culture ==
"Same Direction" is featured as the main soundtrack for Madden NFL 2005. "Just One" is the title track for Top Spin 2 in the US and the Asahi Super Dry beer commercials of Japan in 2007.

== Track listing ==
All lyrics are written by Doug Robb; all music is composed by Daniel Estrin.

No.	Title	Length
1.	"Same Direction"	3:15
2.	"Out of Control" (featuring Ian Watkins and Jamie Oliver)	2:42
3.	"What Happened to Us?"	4:00
4.	"Escape"	3:44
5.	"Just One"	3:19
6.	"Lucky"	2:59
7.	"From the Heart"	3:03
8.	"The Reason"	3:52
9.	"Let It Out"	3:18
10.	"Unaffected"	3:33
11.	"Never There"	3:03
12.	"Disappear"	5:06
Total length:		41:54

Japanese bonus tracks
No.	Title	Length
13.	"Never Saw It Coming"	3:22
14.	"Open Your Eyes"	3:44
Total length:		49:00

15th anniversary deluxe edition
No.	Title	Length
13.	"The Reason" (acoustic; last song on vinyl edition)	3:54
14.	"Force Feed Me"	3:06
15.	"Connected" (Halo 2 soundtrack)	2:40
16.	"Did You" (Spider-Man 2 soundtrack)	3:18
17.	"Right Before Your Eyes" (Daredevil soundtrack)	3:29
Total length:		58:00

== Personnel ==
Adapted from the album's liner notes.

Hoobastank

- Doug Robb – vocals (all tracks)
- Dan Estrin – guitars (all tracks), acoustic guitar (on "What Happened to Us?", "Lucky", "From the Heart", "The Reason", "Unaffected", and "Disappear")
- Markku Lappalainen – bass (all tracks)
- Chris Hesse – drums (all tracks)

Additional musicians

- Howard Benson – keyboards (on "What Happened to Us?" and "The Reason")
- Sam Fisher – violin (on "Lucky", "The Reason", and "Disappear")
- Victor Lawrence – cello (on "Lucky", "The Reason", and "Disappear")
- David Low – cello on ("Lucky", "The Reason", and "Disappear")
- Deborah Lurie – string arrangements (on "Lucky", "The Reason", and "Disappear")
- Rene Mandel – violin (on "Lucky", "The Reason", and "Disappear")
- David Mergen – cello (on "Lucky", "The Reason", and "Disappear")
- Jamie Oliver – group vocals (on "Out of Control")
- Simon Oswell – viola (on "Lucky", "The Reason", and "Disappear")
- Mark Robertson – string contractor and violin (on "Lucky", "The Reason", and "Disappear")
- Shanti Randall – viola (on "Lucky", "The Reason", and "Disappear")
- Michael Valerio – upright bass (on "Lucky", "The Reason", and "Disappear")
- Ian Watkins – group vocals (on "Out of Control")
- Evan Wilson – viola (on "Lucky", "The Reason", and "Disappear")

Production

- Howard Benson – producer
- Chris Lord-Alge – mixing
- Mike Plotnikoff – mixing (on "Let it Out")

Imagery

- Louis Marino – art direction, design, illustrations
- Danny Clinch – band photography
- RJ Muna – cover photography

== Charts ==
=== Weekly charts ===
Weekly chart performance for The Reason
Chart (2004)	Peak position
Australian Albums (ARIA)	23
Austrian Albums (Ö3 Austria)	19
Belgian Albums (Ultratop Wallonia)	51
Canadian Albums (Billboard)	9
French Albums (SNEP)	6
German Albums (Offizielle Top 100)	51
Italian Albums (FIMI)	15
New Zealand Albums (RMNZ)	31
Scottish Albums (Official Charts)	34
Swedish Albums (Sverigetopplistan)	33
Swiss Albums (Schweizer Hitparade)	13
UK Albums (Official Charts)	41
UK Rock & Metal Albums (Official Charts)	3
US Billboard 200	3

=== Year-end charts ===
Year-end chart performance for The Reason
Chart (2004)	Position
Australian Albums (ARIA)	97
French Albums (SNEP)	66
Swiss Albums (Schweizer Hitparade)	96
US Billboard 200	24
Worldwide Albums (IFPI)	34

== Certifications ==
Certifications and sales for The Reason
Region	Certification	Certified units/sales
Australia (ARIA)	Gold	35,000^{^}
Brazil (Pro-Música Brasil) 20th Anniversary edition	2× Platinum	250,000^{‡}
Canada (Music Canada)	Platinum	100,000^{^}
France (SNEP)	Gold	100,000^{*}
Japan (RIAJ)	Gold	100,000^{^}
New Zealand (RMNZ)	Platinum	15,000^{‡}
Singapore (RIAS)	Gold	5,000^{*}
United Kingdom (BPI)	Gold	100,000^{*}
United States (RIAA)	2× Platinum	2,300,000
^{*} Sales figures based on certification alone.^{^} Shipments figures based on certification alone.^{‡} Sales+streaming figures based on certification alone.
