= Remember Me (Hoobastank song) =

2002 single by Hoobastank

Single by Hoobastank

from the album Hoobastank
- Released: September 3, 2002
- Length: 3:34
- Label: Island
- Songwriter(s): Dan Estrin; Chris Hesse; Markku Lappalainen; Doug Robb

Hoobastank singles chronology
"Running Away" (2002)	"Remember Me" (2002)	"Out of Control" (2003)

Music video
- "Remember Me" on YouTube

"Remember Me" is the third single from American rock band Hoobastank's self-titled debut album. It was released as a single in October 2002. "Remember Me" reached number 23 on the US Billboard Modern Rock Tracks chart and did not chart on the Billboard Hot 100. There are two versions of the song, the album version which includes a long intro and the video version with a short guitar intro.

== Music video and song meaning ==
The music video features Hoobastank performing in front of a group of high school students sitting in desks working in a football field. Throughout the music video, various students are shown in a yearbook. The music video was directed by Vem & Tony.

The song is about a fake friend who Hoobastank's vocalist Doug Robb had during high school. Doug Robb said that he had his own group of friends and also said that if he went back to high school now, his teachers wouldn't recognize him. The song "Remember Me" is about somebody who won't hang out with you, but when you become famous, would definitely hang out with you.

== Charts ==
Chart (2002)	Peak position
US Alternative Airplay (Billboard)	23
US Mainstream Rock (Billboard)	28
