= Crawling in the Dark =

2001 single by Hoobastank

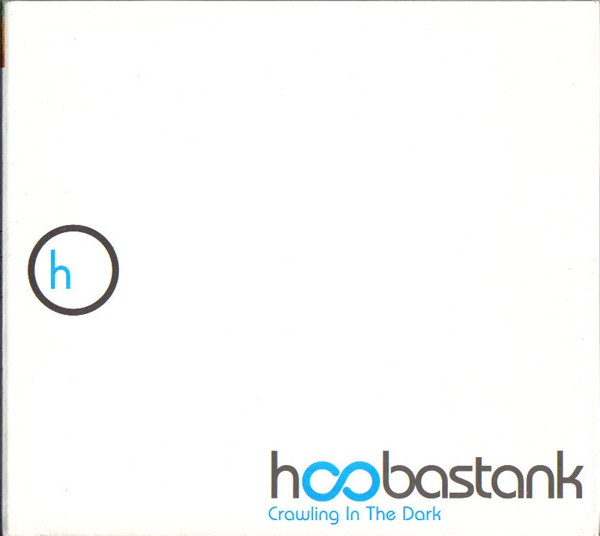
- Cover used for the US CD single release.

Single by Hoobastank

from the album Hoobastank
- Released: October 2, 2001
- Genre: Nu metal; post-grunge
- Length: 2:57
- Label: Island; Mercury
- Songwriters: Dan Estrin; Chris Hesse; Markku Lappalainen; Doug Robb
- Producer: Jim Wirt

Hoobastank singles chronology
"Crawling in the Dark" (2001)	"Running Away" (2002)

Alternate single cover
- Cover used for the UK and Europe CD single release.

Music video
- "Crawling in the Dark" on YouTube

"Crawling in the Dark" is the debut single by American rock band Hoobastank, released from their self-titled second studio album (and their major-label debut). The song was released as a single on October 2, 2001. The single was their breakthrough hit and is their second most successful song from their debut album behind their second hit "Running Away". It reached No. 3 on the Modern Rock Tracks chart and No. 7 on the Mainstream Rock Tracks chart.

In 2024, the staff of Consequence included the song in their list of "50 Kick-Butt Post-Grunge Songs We Can Get Behind".

== Track listing ==
No.	Title	Length
1.	"Crawling in the Dark"	2:57
2.	"Pieces"	3:16
3.	"Losing My Grip"	3:57

Maxi-single
No.	Title	Length
1.	"Crawling in the Dark"	2:57
2.	"Crawling in the Dark" (Acoustic)	3:02
3.	"Pieces"	3:16
4.	"Losing My Grip"	3:57

== Charts ==
=== Weekly charts ===
Chart (2002)	Peak position
Australia (ARIA)	61
Scottish Singles Sales (Official Charts)	46
UK Singles (Official Charts)	47
UK Rock & Metal (Official Charts)	4
US Billboard Hot 100	68
US Alternative Airplay (Billboard)	3
US Mainstream Rock (Billboard)	7

=== Year-end charts ===
Chart (2002)	Position
US Modern Rock Tracks (Billboard)	5

== Release history ==
Region	Date	Format(s)	Label(s)	Ref.
United States	October 2, 2001	Mainstream rock; active rock; alternative radio	Island	
Australia	March 25, 2002	CD	Island	
United Kingdom	April 1, 2002	CD; cassette	Mercury	
