= Hoobastank (album) =

Studio album by Hoobastank
- Released: November 20, 2001
- Recorded: May–July 2001
- Studios: 4th Street Recording (Santa Monica, California); Village Recorder (Los Angeles, California)
- Genres: Alternative rock; alternative metal; post-grunge; nu metal
- Length: 38:59
- Label: Island
- Producer: Jim Wirt

Hoobastank chronology
They Sure Don't Make Basketball Shorts Like They Used To (1998)	Hoobastank (2001)	The Reason (2003)

Singles from Hoobastank
- 1. "Crawling in the Dark" Released: October 2, 2001; 2. "Running Away" Released: April 1, 2002; 3. "Remember Me" Released: September 3, 2002

Professional ratings
Review scores
Source	Rating
AllMusic	4/5 stars
Entertainment Weekly	C
Rolling Stone	(unfavorable)

Hoobastank is the second studio album and major-label debut by American rock band Hoobastank. It was released on November 20, 2001, by Island Records. Three singles were released from the album: "Crawling in the Dark", "Running Away", and "Remember Me". The album went Platinum by the Recording Industry Association of America (RIAA) due to these hit singles and reached No. 25 on the Billboard 200 album charts and No. 1 on the Billboard Heatseeker chart.

== Background ==
The band formed in 1994, and eventually found an audience playing at venues like Cobalt Cafe in Los Angeles with Incubus and Linkin Park. They recorded their first full-length, self-released album in 1998, They Sure Don't Make Basketball Shorts Like They Used To, which features a saxophone section headed by Jeremy Wasser, who recorded the "Summer Romance" saxophone solo on Incubus' S.C.I.E.N.C.E. and executive-produced the album.

By this stage, Hoobastank had developed a reputation in Southern California. This attracted interest from Island Records, who signed the band in 2000. At the time of signing, the group had completed a second full-length album, Forward, also featuring Wasser. However, they felt the direction they were heading would work best without a sax, so Wasser departed the group, and the album was shelved. A few tracks were rerecorded for Hoobastank's self-titled 2001 release. The original recordings from the Forward sessions made their way to the internet via peer-to-peer sites in late 2001.

== Critical reception ==
The album's music and vocals have been compared to the band Incubus, who originated from the same suburban area of Southern California. In a December 2001 MTV interview, guitarist Dan Estrin commented, "we have a lot of people that bash us because they think we sound just like Incubus", adding that "a lot of people don't understand that we're all the same age, we grew up in the same neighborhood and we're influenced by the same bands. Both our singers were heavily influenced by Mike Patton from Faith No More."

Despite garnering heavy comparisons to Incubus, it was met with some positive reviews upon release, with AllMusic's Michael Gallucci awarding it four out of five stars. Joshua T. Cohen of The Pitt News wrote in 2002 that, "their sound and especially their vocals bear a striking similarity to Incubus’ later work", adding that "many categorize Hoobastank as mere 'rip-offs' of Incubus because of these similarities. But for those addicted to the melodic rock sounds of Southern Cali, Hoobastank serves as a great fix."

In a 2002 review of an Incubus and Hoobastank concert, MTV's Leah Greenblatt labelled the sound of the two bands as "sensitive hunk rock [for] teenage girls", and described Hoobastank as having "crunchy, Faith No More-esque riffage." In his book The Encyclopedia of Popular Music, Colin Larkin categorized the band's sound as "melodic metal", also comparing it to Incubus and Faith No More. A negative review came from Rolling Stone's Steve Knopper in November 2001. He critiqued their lack of originality, commenting that "we've heard all Dan Estrin's big-metal guitar riffs before [and] singer Doug Robb has the moany high pitch that's going around metal these days." David Browne of Entertainment Weekly had a similarly mixed review, remarking that the album's lyrical themes "will sound familiar to anyone who’s spent time cranking metal records."

Louder Sound praised the album in 2021, commenting that the band "had the ability to write high-energy, catchy-as-the-plague bangers."

== Track listing ==
No.	Title	Writer(s)	Length
1.	"Crawling in the Dark"	Daniel Estrin; Douglas Robb	2:55
2.	"Remember Me"	Estrin; Robb	3:34
3.	"Running Away"	Estrin; Robb	2:58
4.	"Pieces"	Estrin; Robb; Markku Lappalainen	3:15
5.	"Let You Know"	Estrin; Robb	3:39
6.	"Better"	Lappalainen; Robb	2:53
7.	"Ready for You"	Estrin; Robb	3:07
8.	"Up and Gone"	Lappalainen; Robb	3:21
9.	"Too Little Too Late"	Estrin; Robb	3:15
10.	"Hello Again"	Lappalainen; Robb	3:02
11.	"To Be with You"	Lappalainen; Robb	4:02
12.	"Give It Back"	Estrin; Robb	2:58

Japanese bonus track
No.	Title	Length
13.	"Losing My Grip"	3:55
14.	"The Critic"	4:15

== Personnel ==
Hoobastank

- Doug Robb – lead vocals, rhythm guitar on “Too Little Too Late”
- Dan Estrin – lead guitar
- Markku Lappalainen – bass
- Chris Hesse – drums

Production

- Jim Wirt – producer, engineer
- CJ Eiriksson, Dave Holdredge, Matt Marrin – assistant engineers
- Jay Baumgardner – mixing
- James Murray, Mark Kiczula – mixing assistants

Artwork

- Louis Marino – art direction, design
- Ray Lego – photography
- Rick Patrick – creative director

== Charts ==
=== Weekly charts ===
Weekly chart performance for Hoobastank
Chart (2002)	Peak position
Australian Albums (ARIA)	67
Canadian Albums (Nielsen SoundScan)	84
UK Albums (Official Charts)	96
UK Rock & Metal Albums (Official Charts)	8
US Billboard 200	25
US Heatseekers Albums (Billboard)	1

=== Year-end charts ===
Year-end chart performance for Hoobastank
Chart (2002)	Position
Canadian Albums (Nielsen SoundScan)	192
Canadian Alternative Albums (Nielsen SoundScan)	62
Canadian Metal Albums (Nielsen SoundScan)	32
US Billboard 200	75

== Certifications ==
Certifications for Hoobastank
Region	Certification	Certified units/sales
United States (RIAA)	Platinum	1,000,000^{^}
^{^} Shipments figures based on certification alone.
