= Every Man for Himself (album) =

Studio album by Hoobastank
- Released: May 8, 2006
- Studio: Bay 7 Studios (Valley Village); NRG Recording Studios (North Hollywood); Sparky Dark Studio (Calabasas, California)
- Genre: Alternative rock; post-grunge
- Length: 51:01
- Label: Island
- Producer: Howard Benson

Hoobastank chronology
The Reason (2003)	Every Man for Himself (2006)	Fornever (2009)

Singles from Every Man for Himself
- 1. "If I Were You" Released: March 7, 2006; 2. "Inside of You" Released: May 26, 2006; 3. "Born to Lead" Released: June 18, 2006

Every Man for Himself is the third studio album by the American rock band Hoobastank, released on May 8, 2006, by Island Records. It was the first album not to feature bassist Markku Lappalainen after his departure in 2005; Jane's Addiction bassist Chris Chaney and Paul Bushnell took his place for the album.

== Singles ==
The first single "If I Were You" was released on March 7, 2006.

The second and third singles from Every Man for Himself were "Inside of You" and "Born to Lead" respectively.

Those who pre-ordered the album from Apple's iTunes Music Store, received a bonus track called "Face the Music". Those who purchased the album in Japan received two bonus tracks with their green limited edition CDs titled "Finally Awake" and "Waiting". They also received a DVD with bonus content.

== Promotion ==
Hoobastank announced the "Every Fan for Himself" tour which was billed as a fan appreciation tour, and to help promote the new album.

The song "Without a Fight" was featured in the trailer for the film Stormbreaker. An abridged cover version of the song was composed for the penultimate mission of the Nintendo DS rhythm game Elite Beat Agents in which the titular protagonists first respond to an incursion from hostile alien invaders who outlaw all music.

== Critical reception ==
Professional ratings
Aggregate scores
Source	Rating
Metacritic	53/100
Review scores
Source	Rating
AllMusic	3/5 stars
Billboard	(unfavorable)
Blender	2.5/5 stars
Entertainment Weekly	B−
Los Angeles Times	2/4 stars
PopMatters	4/10
Slant Magazine	1/5 stars

Every Man for Himself was met with "mixed or average" reviews from critics. At Metacritic, which assigns a weighted average rating out of 100 to reviews from mainstream publications, this release received an average score of 53 based on 7 reviews.

In a review for AllMusic, critic reviewer Stephen Thomas Erlewine wrote: "If Every Man for Himself was constructed with the mainstream in mind, it likely won't win any new converts, since at their core Hoobastank remains unchanged: their songs aren't particularly dynamic or catchy, the band doggedly follows alt-rock conventions as if adherence to clichés gives the group legitimacy, and Robb's pedestrian voice alternately disappears into the mix or veers flat when he holds a note."

== Track listing ==
All lyrics are written by Douglas Robb.

Every Man for Himself track listing
No.	Title	Music	Length
1.	"The Rules"		0:52
2.	"Born to Lead"	Daniel Estrin	3:49
3.	"Moving Forward"	Estrin; Robb	4:27
4.	"Inside of You"	Estrin	3:08
5.	"The First of Me"	Estrin; Robb	5:24
6.	"Good Enough"	Estrin	3:21
7.	"If I Were You"	Estrin; Robb	4:18
8.	"Without a Fight"	Estrin; Robb	3:20
9.	"Don't Tell Me"	Estrin; Robb	4:12
10.	"Look Where We Are"	Estrin	3:28
11.	"Say the Same"	Estrin; Robb	4:01
12.	"If Only"	Estrin	3:28
13.	"More Than a Memory"	Estrin	7:15

Japanese and iTunes expanded edition bonus tracks
No.	Title	Length
14.	"Finally Awake"	4:02
15.	"Waiting"	3:05

iTunes pre-order exclusive
No.	Title	Length
1.	"Face the Music"	3:55

== Personnel ==
Hoobastank

- Doug Robb – lead vocals, rhythm guitar, bass (Tracks unknown)
- Daniel Estrin – lead guitar, bass (Tracks unknown)
- Chris Hesse – drums, percussion

Additional musicians

- Howard Benson – ARP 2600, Hammond B3, keyboards, and programming
- Paul Bushnell – bass (tracks 2, 4, 6–8, 11–13)
- Chris Chaney – bass (tracks 3, 5, 9, 10)
- Lenny Castro – percussion
- Deborah Lurie – string arrangements (tracks 7, 12)
- The Heart Attack Horns – horns (tracks 4, 13)
  - Bill Bergman – tenor saxophone, baritone saxophone
  - Les Lovitt – trumpet
- Frank Marocco – accordion (track 13)
- Dale Dye – drill sergeant (tracks 1, 2)

Technical personnel

- Howard Benson – producer
- Mike Plotnikoff – engineer
- Hatsukazu Inagaki – assistant engineer
- Paul Decarli – Pro Tools editing
- Tom Lord-Alge – mixing (tracks 1–11)
- Chris Lord-Alge – mixing (tracks 12, 13)
- Femio Hernandez – mixing assistant (tracks 1–11)
- Keith Armstrong – mixing assistant (tracks 12, 13)
- Ted Jensen – mastering
- Casey Stone – strings engineer (tracks 7, 12)

== Charts ==
Chart performance for Every Man for Himself
Chart (2006)	Peak position
Austrian Albums (Ö3 Austria)	68
Canadian Albums (Nielsen SoundScan)	44
French Albums (SNEP)	73
German Albums (Offizielle Top 100)	32
Japanese Albums (Oricon)	8
Swiss Albums (Schweizer Hitparade)	45
UK Rock & Metal Albums (OCC)	15
US Billboard 200	12
US Top Rock Albums (Billboard)	5

== Certifications ==
Certifications for Every Man for Himself
Region	Certification	Certified units/sales
United States (RIAA)	Gold	500,000^{^}
^{^} Shipments figures based on certification alone.
