= Running Away =

2002 single by Hoobastank

Single by Hoobastank

from the album Hoobastank
- B-side: "Up and Gone" (acoustic); "Open Your Eyes"
- Released: April 1, 2002
- Genre: Nu metal; post-grunge
- Length: 2:58
- Label: Island; Mercury
- Songwriters: Dan Estrin; Chris Hesse; Markku Lappalainen; Doug Robb

Hoobastank singles chronology
"Crawling in the Dark" (2001)	"Running Away" (2002)	"Remember Me" (2002)

Music video
- "Running Away" on YouTube

"Running Away" is a single recorded by the American rock band Hoobastank. It was the second single released from their self-titled debut album on April 1, 2002. The song peaked at number two on the US Billboard Modern Rock Tracks chart.

== Music video ==
In the music video for "Running Away", Hoobastank appears playing on a background depicting a woman who tries to run away from her problems. It was directed by Paul Fedor.

== Track listings ==
UK CD single

1. "Running Away" (album version)
2. "Crawling in the Dark" (acoustic)
3. "Up and Gone" (acoustic)
4. "Running Away" (video)

Australian CD single

1. "Running Away" (album version)
2. "Running Away" (acoustic)
3. "Up and Gone" (acoustic)
4. "Open Your Eyes"

== Charts ==
=== Weekly charts ===
Chart (2002)	Peak position
Australia (ARIA)	83
UK Singles (OCC)	100
UK Rock & Metal (OCC)	13
US Billboard Hot 100	44
US Adult Pop Airplay (Billboard)	31
US Alternative Airplay (Billboard)	2
US Mainstream Rock (Billboard)	9
US Pop Airplay (Billboard)	23

=== Year-end charts ===
Chart (2002)	Position
US Adult Top 40 (Billboard)	92
US Mainstream Top 40 (Billboard)	84
US Modern Rock Tracks (Billboard)	7

== Release history ==
Region	Date	Format(s)	Label(s)	Ref.
United States	April 1, 2002	Mainstream rock; active rock; alternative radio	Island	
United States	June 24, 2002	Contemporary hit radio	Island	
United Kingdom	July 15, 2002	CD; cassette	Mercury	
Australia	July 22, 2002	CD	Island	
