= Fight or Flight (Hoobastank album) =

Studio album by Hoobastank
- Released: September 11, 2012
- Genres: Post-grunge; alternative rock
- Length: 42:20
- Label: Open E Entertainment (EMI)
- Producer: Gavin Brown

Hoobastank chronology
| Is This the Day? (2010) | Fight or Flight (2012) | Push Pull (2018) |

Singles from Fight or Flight
- 1. "This Is Gonna Hurt" Released: May 3, 2012; 2. "Can You Save Me?" Released: January 25, 2013; 3. "Incomplete" Released: July 24, 2013

Alternate covers
- Original cover

Professional ratings
Review scores
| Source | Rating |
|---|---|
| AllMusic | 3.5/5 stars |
| Melodic.net | 3.5/5 stars |
| Under the Gun Review | 6.5/10 |

Fight or Flight, is the fifth studio album by American rock band Hoobastank released on September 11, 2012. Like their previous album, the album deals with relationships and love themes and it follows a more mainstream sound.

== Overview ==
Produced by Gavin Brown, the album features eleven new studio tracks including first single, "This Is Gonna Hurt". On May 3, 2012, the band revealed the first single on their official website. The release of Fight or Flight marks the band's newfound independence and the opportunity to move forward on their own terms. "We've been on this journey for a long time now", says singer Doug Robb. "It's like a clean slate, but not in a bad way—quite the opposite. We're no longer trying to satisfy others, not even on a subconscious level; we're comfortable in our own skin". On July 11, 2012, a tentative cover artwork was revealed in Hoobastank's Facebook page, but on the 19th, it was changed for the definitive cover artwork.

== Track listing ==
All songs written by Douglas Robb, Daniel Estrin, Chris Hesse, Jesse Charland.

| No. | Title | Length |
|---|---|---|
| 1. | "This Is Gonna Hurt" | 3:50 |
| 2. | "You Before Me" | 4:24 |
| 3. | "The Fallen" | 3:16 |
| 4. | "Can You Save Me?" | 3:55 |
| 5. | "No Destination" | 3:43 |
| 6. | "Slow Down" | 4:40 |
| 7. | "No Win Situation" | 3:46 |
| 8. | "Sing What You Can't Say" | 3:23 |
| 9. | "Magnolia" | 4:09 |
| 10. | "Incomplete" | 3:12 |
| 11. | "A Thousand Words" | 4:01 |
| Total length: | | 42:20 |

Japanese bonus track
| No. | Title | Length |
|---|---|---|
| 12. | "The Pressure" | 4:05 |

== Personnel ==
Hoobastank

- Doug Robb – lead vocals, rhythm guitar
- Daniel Estrin – lead guitar, ukulele
- Chris Hesse – drums, percussion
- Jesse Charland – bass, backing vocals, keyboards

Production

- Steve Wood, Paul Geary – management
- Gavin Brown – producer
- Paul David Hager – mixing

== Charts ==
Album

| Chart (2012) | Peak position |
|---|---|
| Japanese Albums (Oricon) | 18 |
| US Billboard 200 | 66 |
| US Independent Albums (Billboard) | 17 |
| US Top Alternative Albums (Billboard) | 16 |
| US Top Rock Albums (Billboard) | 27 |

Singles

| Year | Song | US Main. | JPN |
|---|---|---|---|
| 2012 | "This Is Gonna Hurt" | 28 | 70 |
