= Hoobastank =

American rock band

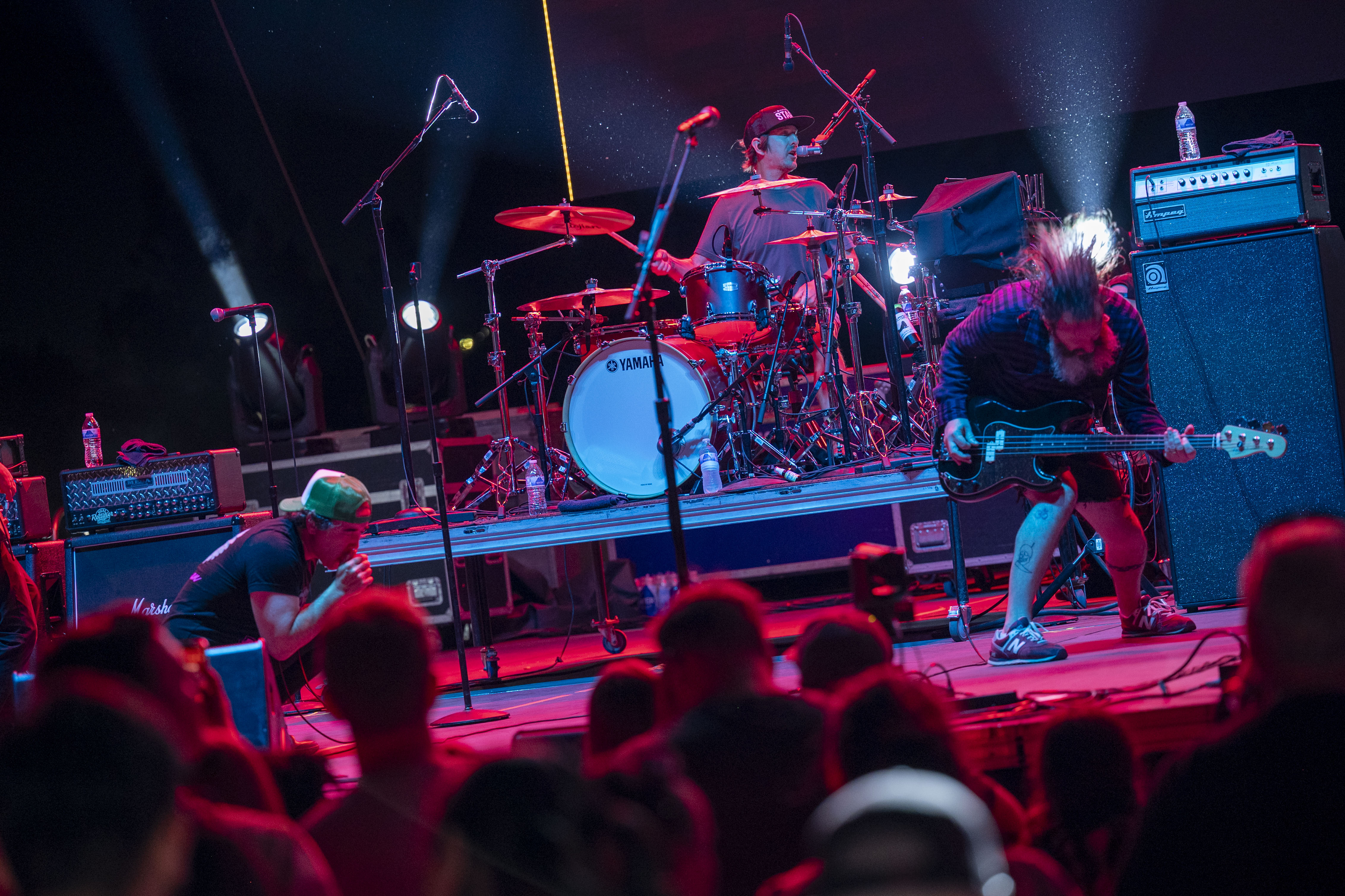
- Hoobastank performing in 2024

Background information
- Also known as: Hoobustank (1994–2001)
- Origin: Agoura Hills, California, U.S.
- Genres: Alternative rock; nu metal; post-grunge; funk metal (early); ska punk (early)
- Years active: 1994–present
- Labels: Island; Open E; EMI; Napalm
- Members: Doug Robb; Dan Estrin; Chris Hesse; Jesse Charland
- Past members: Markku Lappalainen; Jeremy Wasser; Derek Kwan; Matt McKenzie; Josh Moreau; David Amezcua
- Website: hoobastank.com
- Logo

Hoobastank (sometimes stylized as h∞bastank, and originally known as Hoobustank) (Note: /huːbəstænk/) is an American rock band formed in 1994 in Agoura Hills, California, by vocalist Doug Robb, guitarist Dan Estrin, drummer Chris Hesse, and original bassist Markku Lappalainen. They were signed to Island Records from 2001 to 2012 and have released six albums and one EP to date. Their most recent album, Push Pull, came out in May 2018. They are best known for the title track of their second album, The Reason (2003), and they have sold ten million albums worldwide.

== History ==
=== Early career (1994–2000) ===
Vocalist Doug Robb knew guitarist Dan Estrin before competing against him in a high school battle of the bands, and the two decided to form a band, recruiting bassist Markku Lappalainen and drummer Chris Hesse.

The origin of the name "Hoobastank" is not clear, and the band's members have made different statements on the topic. Claims include a mispronunciation of a German street, slang for someone who owns many sneakers, or a word the band invented while "joking around".

Hoobastank started playing at Cobalt Cafe in Los Angeles with Incubus and Linkin Park. They recorded their first full-length, self-released album in 1998, They Sure Don't Make Basketball Shorts Like They Used To, which features a saxophone section headed by Jeremy Wasser, who recorded the "Summer Romance" saxophone solo on Incubus' S.C.I.E.N.C.E. and executive-produced the album.

By this stage, Hoobastank had developed a reputation in Southern California. This attracted interest from Island Records, who signed the band in 2000. At the time of signing, the group had completed a second full-length album, Forward, also featuring Wasser. However, they felt the direction they were heading would work best without a sax, so Wasser departed the group, and the album was shelved. A few tracks were rerecorded for Hoobastank's self-titled 2001 release. The original recordings from the Forward sessions made their way to the internet via peer-to-peer sites in late 2001.

=== Hoobastank (2001–2002) ===
Hoobastank released their self-titled debut album in November 2001. The first single was "Crawling in the Dark", which was a breakthrough hit, reaching No. 68 on the Billboard Hot 100, No. 3 on the Modern Rock chart, and No. 7 on the Mainstream Rock chart. The song was featured in the 2002 inline skating game Aggressive Inline, appearing on the Xbox, PlayStation 2, and GameCube consoles. The second single, "Running Away", was even more successful, reaching No. 44 on the Billboard Hot 100, No. 2 on the Modern Rock chart, and No. 9 on the Mainstream Rock chart. The album went Platinum due to these hit singles and reached No. 25 on the Billboard 200 album charts and No. 1 on the Billboard Heatseeker chart.

Hoobastank achieved international recognition, with the band touring Europe and Asia to support the record. "Remember Me", the third single, was a moderate hit, reaching No. 23 on the Modern Rock chart. The band recorded a song titled "Losing My Grip" for the soundtrack of the 2002 movie The Scorpion King, included as a bonus track on the Japanese edition of the album, along with the song "The Critic".

=== The Reason (2003–2005) ===
In early 2003, Hoobastank contributed the song "Right Before Your Eyes" to Daredevil: The Album and entered the studio with producer Howard Benson. Recording was disrupted for a month when Dan Estrin was injured in a minibike accident in August. Estrin had recovered by October, and the band went on the Nokia Unwired Tour with the All-American Rejects and Ozomatli in November.

Their second album, The Reason, was released in December 2003 and eventually reached No. 3 on the US Billboard 200 album chart.

The first single, "Out of Control", was available for download on their website. The next single, "Same Direction", reached No. 9 on the US Modern Rock chart, No. 16 on the Mainstream Rock chart, and No. 16 on a composite World Modern Rock chart (based on the US, Germany, Sweden, Finland, Canada, and Australia). A year later, the DVD Let It Out collected the band's videos.

The album's title track was released as a single in the first half of 2004 and became a hit, reaching No. 2 on the Billboard Hot 100, No. 1 on the US and World Modern Rock charts, No. 10 in Australia, No. 12 in the United Kingdom, and No. 15 in Germany. In Canada, it spent 21 weeks at the top, setting a new record for most weeks at No. 1.

The band's international profile was increased by a support slot on Linkin Park's Meteora world tour in early 2004.

Bassist Markku Lappalainen left Hoobastank following their 2005 Summer Tour, and Matt McKenzie from Tsunami Bomb took over for the remaining 2005 dates.

=== Every Man for Himself (2006–2007) ===
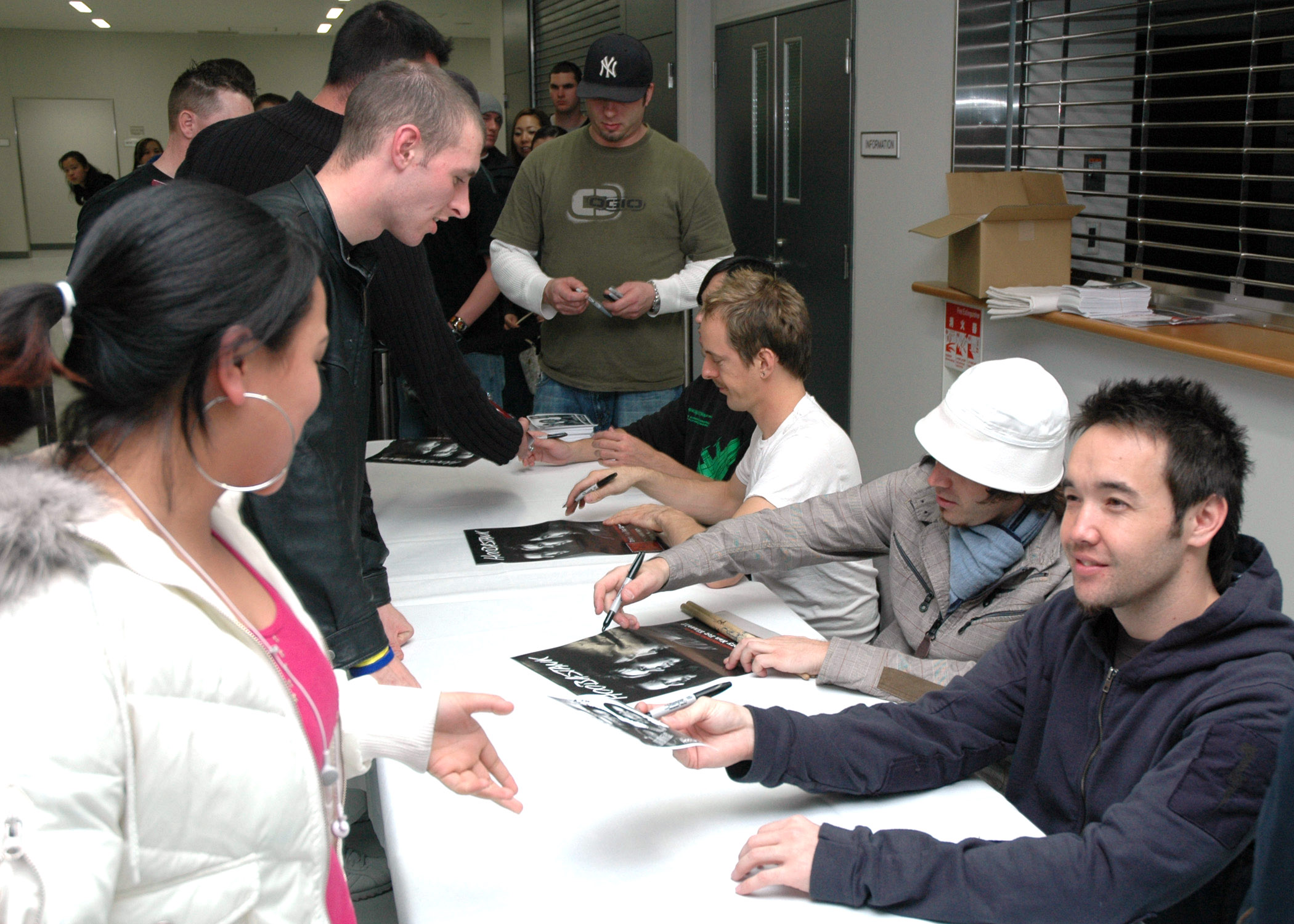
Hoobastank signing autographs for fans in 2007

Hoobastank's third album, Every Man for Himself, was released in May 2006 and debuted at No. 12 on the Billboard chart. It was eventually certified Gold in the US. Three singles, "If I Were You", "Inside of You", and "Born to Lead", were issued. Around this time, bassist Josh Moreau joined the band, replacing McKenzie.

On a 2005 co-headlining tour with Velvet Revolver, Hoobastank received a chilly reception from some audiences, and rumors of a feud between Robb and Velvet Revolver frontman Scott Weiland filled internet message boards. The song "If I Were You" from Every Man for Himself addressed the affair. Robb later said in an interview with MTV News online that he had nothing against Weiland or any other member of Velvet Revolver.

=== For(N)ever and Greatest Hits (2008–2009) ===
In October 2007, Robb posted on the official Hoobastank website that the band had "set the bar very very high for this next CD" and that they had "more ideas going into this CD than ever before". On June 2, 2008, he announced that recording for their then-upcoming album was almost done and to expect a release date within a couple of weeks.

The first single from the album, "My Turn", premiered on October 13, 2008, and the record itself, For(N)ever, was released on January 27, 2009.

On April 20, 2010, a Vanessa Amorosi fan website revealed details of a collaboration between Hoobastank and the Australian singer, a duet version of "The Letter". On August 5, it was confirmed that there was another version of the song on Universal International, this one a duet with Anna Tsuchiya. The track appeared on the deluxe edition of Hoobastank's first compilation album, The Greatest Hits: Don't Touch My Moustache, which came out on August 5.

Hoobastank was a support band on Creed's 2009 reunion tour.

=== Is This the Day? (2009–2010) ===
Hoobastank announced on Twitter that they were recording an acoustic album on September 2, 2009.

On October 30, they covered the song "Ghostbusters" for Halloween, and a music video was released on their official YouTube channel.

The band released Live from the Wiltern in December 8, which was available exclusively through iTunes.

On January 19, 2010, Hoobastank issued a new song, "We Are One", as part of a compilation from Music for Relief in support of the Haiti earthquake crisis. On February 12, they released another new track, "Never Be Here Again", as part of the AT&T Team USA Soundtrack.

In May, the band announced that they would perform an acoustic live tour of Japan. On August 4, they released an acoustic album in Japan only, titled Is This the Day?

=== Fight or Flight (2011–2015) ===
In April 2012, the band announced their fifth studio album, Fight or Flight. On May 3, they revealed the first single, "This Is Gonna Hurt", and the album came out on September 11. To promote it, two more singles, "Can You Save Me?" and "Incomplete", accompanied by a touring music video and a lyric video, respectively, were issued.

=== Push Pull (2016–present) ===
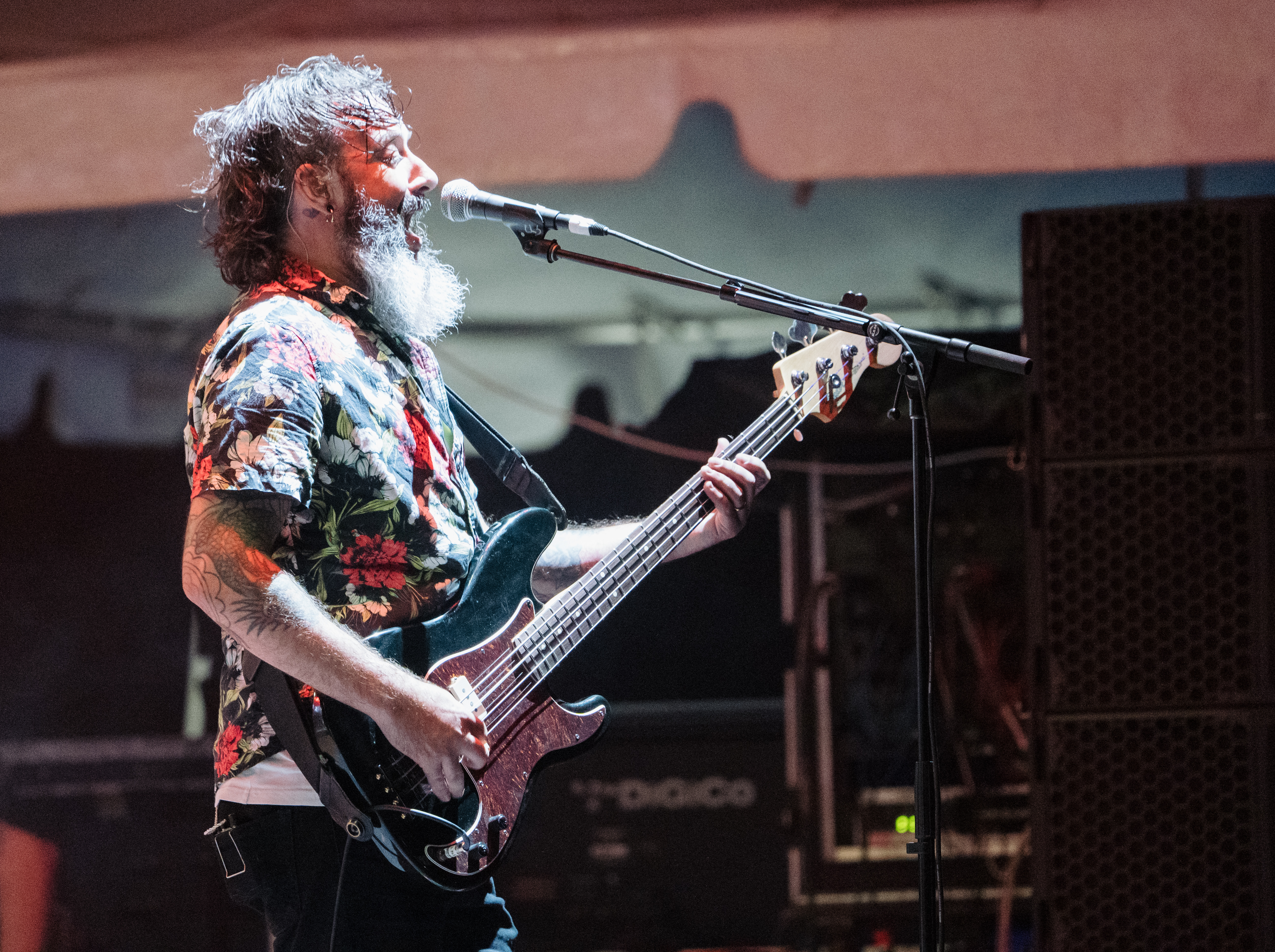
Bassist Jesse Charland in 2023

In November 2016, Hoobastank began recording their sixth studio album with producer Matt Wallace.

In 2017, Robb provided vocals for "Fist Bump", the theme song of the video game Sonic Forces. In October, the band signed with Napalm Records and announced that their sixth studio album was finished and expected to be released in the first half of 2018.

Push Pull was issued worldwide on May 25, along with the first single, "More Beautiful".

Throughout 2018, the band toured to commemorate the 15th anniversary of their 2003 album, The Reason, playing the record in its entirety. On August 16, 2019, the band announced that they would reissue The Reason on October 4 with a vinyl release and a digital version with bonus tracks.

In September 2022, a documentary series about the making of the band's self-titled debut album was uploaded to their official YouTube channel, in commemoration of the record's 20th anniversary.

On June 14, 2026, Hoobastank released "How Do You Sleep?", the band's first new song since their 2018 album, Push Pull. They debuted the song at the Warped Tour in Washington, D.C..

== Musical style and influences ==
Hoobastank have been categorized under genres such as post-grunge, alternative rock, hard rock, and nu metal. On their early independent releases, the band, which included a saxophonist, used a funk metal and ska punk sound. On their major-label, self-titled debut album, their sound changed: they removed their saxophonist and became a four-piece rock band, playing an alternative rock style. Hoobastank's sound matured on their second album, The Reason, and became more melodic. Singer Doug Robb has cited Faith No More vocalist Mike Patton as being one of his main influences. In a 2004 Rolling Stone interview, Robb commented that, "Faith No More is my favorite band of all time. I listen to those records constantly."

== Band members ==
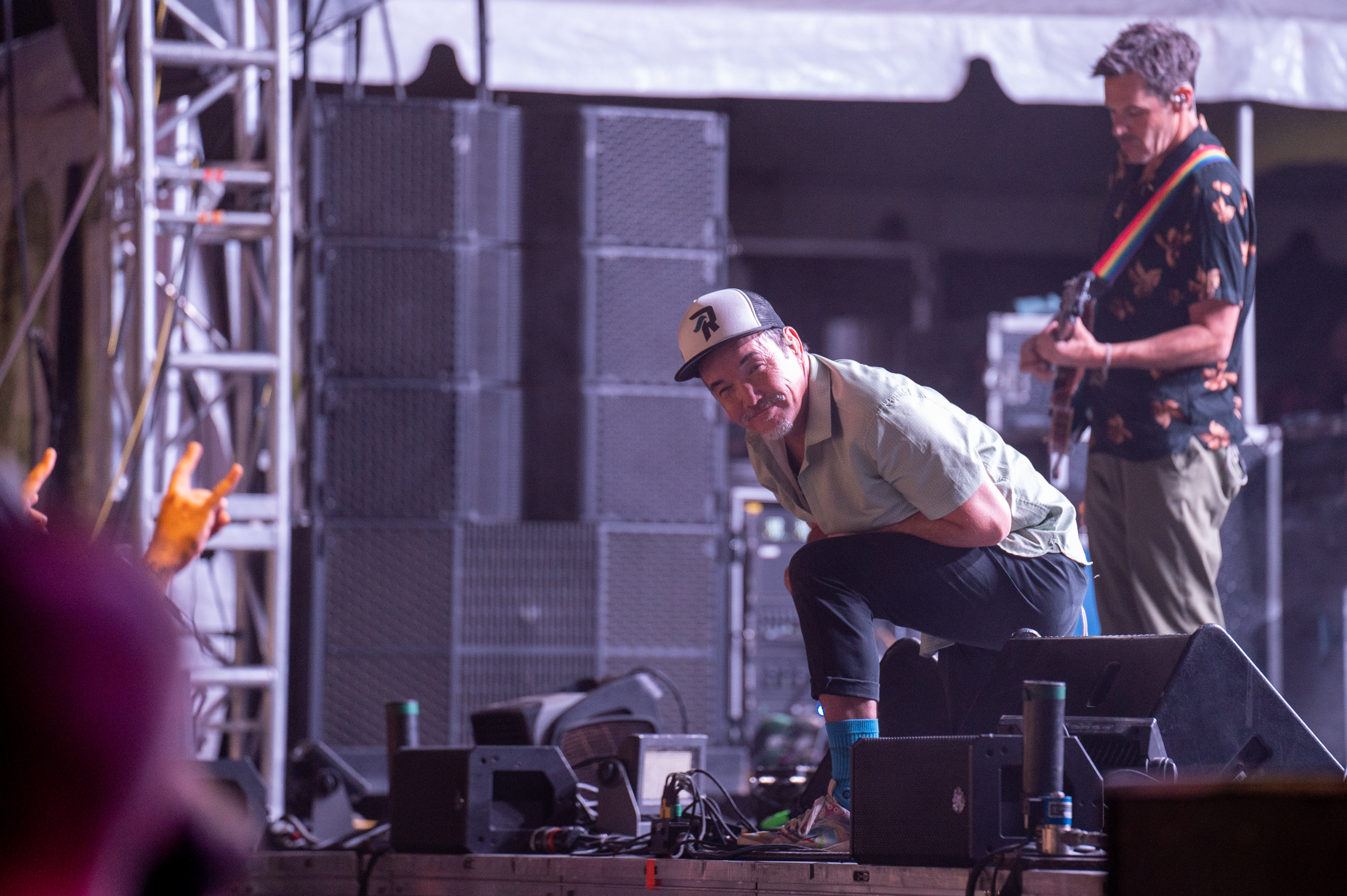
Doug Robb and Dan Estrin performing in 2023

=== Current members ===
- Doug Robb – lead vocals, rhythm guitar (1994–present)
- Dan Estrin – lead guitar, backing vocals (1994–present)
- Chris Hesse – drums, backing vocals (1994–present)
- Jesse Charland – bass, keyboards, backing vocals (2009–present)

=== Studio members ===
- Paul Bushnell – bass (2005–2006, 2008)
- Chris Chaney – bass (2005–2006)

=== Past members ===
- Jeremy Wasser – saxophone (1995–2000)
- Derek Kwan – saxophone (1997–1999)
- Markku Lappalainen – bass (1994–2005)
- Matt McKenzie – bass (2005)
- Josh Moreau – bass, backing vocals (2006–2008)
- David Amezcua – bass, backing vocals (2008–2009, touring substitute for Charland in 2023)

== Awards and nominations ==
=== BDS Spin Awards ===
Year	Nominee / work	Award	Result
2007	"The Reason"	800,000 Spins	Won

=== Billboard Music Awards ===
Year	Nominee / work	Award	Result
2002	Hoobastank	Modern Rock Artist of the Year	Nominated
2004	Hoobastank	Hot 100 Artist Duo/Group of the Year	Nominated
2004	"The Reason"	Mainstream Top 40 Single of the Year	Nominated
2004	"The Reason"	Top Digital Song	Nominated
2004	Hoobastank	Top Duo/Group	Nominated

=== California Music Awards ===
Year	Nominee / work	Award	Result
2003	Hoobastank	Outstanding Debut Album	Nominated

=== Hungarian Music Awards ===
Year	Nominee / work	Award	Result	Ref.
2005	"The Reason"	Best Foreign Modern Rock Recording	Nominated	

=== Grammy Awards ===
Year	Nominee / work	Award	Result
2004	The Reason	Best Rock Album	Nominated
2004	"The Reason"	Best Pop Performance by a Duo or Group with Vocal	Nominated
2004	"The Reason"	Song of the Year	Nominated

=== Groovevolt Music and Fashion Awards ===
Year	Nominee / work	Award	Result
2005	"The Reason"	Best Collaboration, Duo or Group	Nominated

=== Mike Awards ===
Year	Nominee / work	Award	Result
2004	"The Reason"	Video of the Year	Nominated
2004	The Reason	Record of the Year	Nominated

=== MTV Video Music Awards ===
Year	Nominee / work	Award	Result
2004	"The Reason"	Best Group Video	Nominated
2004	"The Reason"	Best Rock Video	Nominated

=== MTV Asia Video Music Awards ===
Year	Nominee / work	Award	Result
2005	Hoobastank	Favorite International Rock Act	Won

=== MTV Video Music Awards Japan ===
Year	Nominee / work	Award	Result
2005	"The Reason"	Best Rock Video	Won

=== MuchMusic Video Awards ===
Year	Nominee / work	Award	Result
2004	"The Reason"	International Video – Group	Nominated

=== NRJ Radio Awards ===
Year	Nominee / work	Award	Result
2005	Hoobastank	Best International Artist	Won

=== Radio Disney Music Awards ===
Year	Nominee / work	Award	Result
2004	Hoobastank	Funniest Band Name	Won

=== Teen Choice Awards ===
Year	Nominee / work	Award	Result	Ref.
2004	"The Reason"	Choice Rock Track	Nominated	
2004	"The Reason"	Choice Love Song	Nominated	
2004	"The Reason"	Choice Summer Song	Nominated	
2004	Hoobastank	Choice Rock Group	Nominated	
2006	Hoobastank	Choice Rock Group	Nominated	

=== Texas Buzz Awards ===
Year	Nominee / work	Award	Result
2005	Hoobastank	Musicians Choice	Won

== Discography ==
Studio albums

- They Sure Don't Make Basketball Shorts Like They Used To (1998)
- Hoobastank (2001)
- The Reason (2003)
- Every Man for Himself (2006)
- Fornever (2009)
- Fight or Flight (2012)
- Push Pull (2018)
