= The Best of Pantera: Far Beyond the Great Southern Cowboys' Vulgar Hits! =

Greatest hits album by Pantera
- Released: September 23, 2003
- Recorded: 1989–2000
- Genre: Groove metal
- Length: 78:03
- Labels: Elektra; Rhino
- Compiler: Kim Davis

Pantera chronology
Reinventing the Steel (2000)	The Best of Pantera: Far Beyond the Great Southern Cowboys' Vulgar Hits! (2003)	Rhino Hi-Five: Pantera (2006)

Professional ratings
Review scores
Source	Rating
AllMusic	4.5/5 stars
The Rolling Stone Album Guide	4/5 stars

The Best of Pantera: Far Beyond the Great Southern Cowboys' Vulgar Hits! is a compilation album by American heavy metal band Pantera, released on September 23, 2003, two months before their breakup. The title of the compilation is a combination of the titles of their first four major label albums.

The compilation includes an audio CD of 15 previously released tracks and one previously unreleased track, plus a DVD with 12 music videos, two of them live. The tracks on the CD include songs from all six major label albums (two from Cowboys from Hell, three from Vulgar Display of Power, four from Far Beyond Driven, one from The Great Southern Trendkill, one from Official Live: 101 Proof, and three from Reinventing the Steel), as well as three cover songs, all in chronological order. The compilation album reached No. 38 on the Billboard 200 chart and was certified Gold by the RIAA in August 2004 and Platinum in January 2006.

The International version of the album, titled Reinventing Hell: The Best of Pantera (combination of the titles of their albums Reinventing the Steel and Cowboys from Hell), is almost identical. It has different artwork and a cardboard slip cover. It also has different tracks than its US counterpart and is available as a standard version or with a DVD.

== Track listing ==
All tracks are written by Pantera except where noted.

No.	Title	Length
1.	"Cowboys from Hell"	4:06
2.	"Cemetery Gates"	7:03
3.	"Mouth for War"	3:57
4.	"Walk"	5:16
5.	"This Love"	6:34
6.	"I'm Broken"	4:24
7.	"Becoming"	3:07
8.	"5 Minutes Alone"	5:51
9.	"Planet Caravan" (Black Sabbath cover) (Ozzy Osbourne, Tony Iommi, Geezer Butler, Bill Ward)	4:04
10.	"Drag the Waters"	4:57
11.	"Where You Come From"	5:13
12.	"Cat Scratch Fever" (Ted Nugent cover) (Ted Nugent)	3:49
13.	"Revolution Is My Name"	5:19
14.	"I'll Cast a Shadow"	5:19
15.	"Goddamn Electric"	4:57
16.	"Hole in the Sky" (Black Sabbath cover) (Osbourne, Iommi, Butler, Ward)	4:16
Total length:		78:07

- Tracks 1–2 from Cowboys from Hell
- Tracks 3–5 from Vulgar Display of Power
- Tracks 6–9 from Far Beyond Driven
- Track 10 from The Great Southern Trendkill
- Track 11 from Official Live: 101 Proof
- Track 12 from the Detroit Rock City soundtrack
- Track 13–15 from Reinventing the Steel
- Track 16 from Revolution Is My Name EP

=== International version (Reinventing Hell) ===
No.	Title	Length
1.	"Cowboys from Hell"	4:06
2.	"Domination"	5:04
3.	"Cemetery Gates"	7:03
4.	"Mouth for War"	3:57
5.	"Walk"	5:16
6.	"This Love"	6:34
7.	"Fucking Hostile"	2:49
8.	"Becoming"	3:07
9.	"I'm Broken"	4:24
10.	"5 Minutes Alone"	5:51
11.	"Planet Caravan" (Black Sabbath cover) (Osbourne, Iommi, Butler, Ward)	4:04
12.	"Drag the Waters"	4:57
13.	"Where You Come From"	5:13
14.	"Revolution Is My Name"	5:19
15.	"Immortally Insane"	5:12
16.	"The Badge" (Poison Idea cover)	3:56

- Tracks 1–3 are found on Cowboys from Hell
- Tracks 4–7 are found on Vulgar Display of Power
- Tracks 8–11 are found on Far Beyond Driven
- Track 12 is found on The Great Southern Trendkill
- Track 13 is found on Official Live: 101 Proof
- Track 14 is found on Reinventing the Steel
- Track 15 is found on Revolution Is My Name or the Heavy Metal 2000 and The Texas Chainsaw Massacre soundtrack
- Track 16 is found on Far Beyond Driven (Japanese and 'Driven Downunder' editions only) or Planet Caravan Part 1 and Planet Caravan Part 2 or The Crow soundtrack

== DVD music videos ==
1. "Cowboys from Hell"
2. "Psycho Holiday"
3. "Cemetery Gates"
4. "Mouth for War"
5. "This Love"
6. "Walk"
7. "5 Minutes Alone"
8. "I'm Broken"
9. "Drag the Waters"
10. "Domination" (live)
11. "Primal Concrete Sledge" (live)
12. "Revolution Is My Name"

== Personnel ==
- Phil Anselmo – vocals
- Dimebag Darrell – guitar, producer, mixing
- Rex Brown – bass
- Vinnie Paul – drums, producer, mixing, engineer
- Matt Lane – mixing assistant
- Ulrich Wild – engineer
- Mark McKenna – art direction
- Sean Beavan – assistant engineer
- Neil Zlozower – photography
- Lamont Hyde – assistant engineer
- Jay Blakesberg – photography
- Sevie Bates – art direction
- Sterling Winfield – producer, engineer, mixing assistant, mixing, assistant engineer
- Steve Woolard – discographical annotation
- Emily Cagan – project assistant
- George Desota – photography
- Kenny Nemes – project assistant
- Steve Pokorny – remastering
- Joe Giron – photography
- Karen Ahmed – compilation producer
- Valerie Valera – project assistant
- Randy Perry – project assistant
- Ginger Dettman – project assistant
- Hiro Arishima – liner notes
- Terence Butler – arranger
- John Atashian – photography
- Dorothy Stefanski – editorial supervision
- Ashely Maile – photography
- Bob King – photography
- Terry Date – producer, engineer, mixing
- Kimberly Davis – compilation producer
- Dan Hersch – remastering
- Tony Iommi – arranger
- Tim Kimsey – mixing assistant
- Ted Nugent – arranger
- Ozzy Osbourne – arranger
- Pantera – arranger, producer, mixing
- John Kirkpatrick – compilation producer

== Charts ==
Chart (2003)	Peak position
Irish Albums (IRMA)	44
New Zealand Albums (RMNZ)	32
UK Albums Chart	116
US Billboard 200	38

Chart (2006)	Peak position
US Top Catalog Albums (Billboard)	12

Chart (2010)	Peak position
Finnish Albums (Suomen virallinen lista)	33

== Certifications ==
Region	Certification	Certified units/sales
Argentina (CAPIF)	Gold	20,000^{^}
United Kingdom (BPI)	Gold	100,000^{^}
United States (RIAA)	Platinum	1,000,000^{^}
^{^} Shipments figures based on certification alone.
