= Hollow (Pantera song) =

Promotional single by Pantera

from the album Vulgar Display of Power
- Released: September 1992
- Recorded: 1991
- Genre: Heavy metal; power ballad
- Length: 5:48 (album version); 4:59 (American single version); 2:58 (German single version)
- Label: Atco
- Songwriters: Dimebag Darrell; Vinnie Paul; Phil Anselmo; Rex Brown
- Producers: Terry Date; Vinnie Paul

Pantera promotional single chronology
"This Love" (1992)	"Hollow" (1992)	"Fucking Hostile" (1992)

"Hollow" is a song by American heavy metal band Pantera that appears as the closing track on their sixth studio album, Vulgar Display of Power (1992). Written by all four members of the band and produced by Terry Date with drummer Vinnie Paul, the power ballad is about a person in a comatose state. It shows a more sad and sensitive side to Pantera's signature groove metal style, that has been described as harsher take on the 1980s heavy metal power ballad.

A promotional single was released by Atco in September 1992, but failed to chart. A live medley with the song and "Domination", is featured on Official Live: 101 Proof as "Dom/Hollow".

== Background and recording ==
"Hollow" is inspired by lead singer Phil Anselmo's rough childhood. He recalled his "mom was great; dad was aloof. They were both terribly young. I was born with mom's heart and dad's diseases. I had a stepfather I resented. I fuckin' split from my house when I was 15. Then I came back and left for good at 16." Around this time, he started getting into relationships, many influencing "This Love", another power ballad on Vulgar Display of Power. He had little connection with his girlfriends, but matured by 2018, when he was interviewed by Revolver, "that's not the way I am anymore, obviously. I've learned some lessons here and there. But that's how I felt then."

Anselmo also experienced many deaths in his youth, such as Mike Hatch, a friend of his and guitarist for punk rock band Shell Shock (that featured future Crowbar frontman and Down guitarist Kirk Windstein and Eyehategod guitarist and Down drummer Jimmy Bower). He committed suicide in 1988, shortly after Anselmo had moved to Texas. He could not attend his funeral because Pantera was playing. He continues "I also had a former high-school friend, named Roman, who had taken his life. I had a friend named Henry, who had taken his life so tragically.

== Composition and lyrics ==
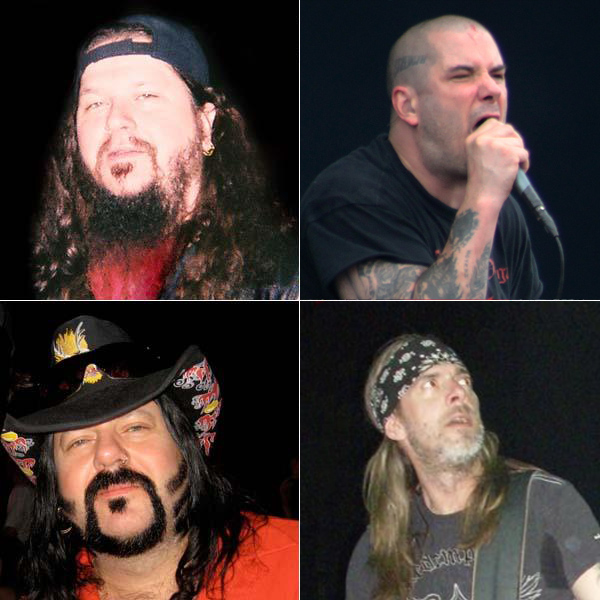
"Hollow" was written by all four members of Pantera

"Hollow" is a power ballad, more aggressive than most in the emotional style of music, but more melodic than most of Pantera's discography, with a traditional heavy metal sound. The song begins in the key of A minor with a harmonized electric guitar phrasing in 6/8, with an electric guitar with a chorus effect in the background. Phil Anselmo's voice is much softer in the beginning of this song as opposed to the rest of the album. It begins with a slow tempo of around 64 beats per minute, which continues until the middle. Preceding a short solo by Dimebag Darrell, there is a short breakdown and the song continues with more intense heavy riffing and drumming, now in 4/4, and aggressive raspy singing and growling from Anselmo.

The lyrics are reminiscent of the band's previous power ballad, "Cemetery Gates", and reflect on a friend in a comatose or vegetative state. Phil Anselmo has confirmed the song is not about a specific person, but a series of losses he suffered. "I knew that people were going to take the lyrics and make them their own. I tried to make it a heart-throttling gut-wrencher for everyone to relate to," he stated. David Slavković of Ultimate Guitar described the song as a "sad," "sensitive" and "depressing" piece from a band who is more associated with heavier music, but turned out to have "a great sense for that as well."

== Release ==
Although "Hollow" is one of Pantera's best-known songs, it failed to chart. Two promotional singles of the song were released by Atco. The German release from September 1992 has cover art and is backed with Vulgar Display of Power album tracks "By Demons Be Driven" and "Mouth for War". The title track was more than halved from five minutes and 48 seconds, to two minutes and 58 seconds. The American release, also from 1992, has a generic cover and the album version of "Hollow" as the B-side, but a longer single version at four minutes and 59 seconds.

"Hollow" was given more exposure in 1994, when it was rereleased on October 10 as the B-side to one of the European singles of "Planet Caravan." The CD-Maxi was released in two versions, both having the title track and "The Badge" as the A-side, but the first single has live recordings of "A New Level" and "Becoming", while the second single has "Domination" and "Hollow", but listed as separate songs and not the medley, "Dom/Hollow".

=== "Dom/Hollow" ===
A live medley with the song and "Domination", known as "Dom/Hollow", "Domination/Hollow" or "Domination & Hollow", is a staple of Pantera's live concerts. The band starts with "Domination", but leads into the ending of "Hollow" (which is roughly the last two minutes and 30 seconds of the album version). The medley was first played on May 31, 1992 at Five Flags Center in Dubuque, Iowa, but gained popularity as the ninth track on the live album, Official Live: 101 Proof (1997). When reviewing the album, Carl Fisher of GAMES, BRRRAAAINS & A HEAD-BANGING LIFE thought "the idea to combine several songs into one was genius." "Dom/Hollow" was also the closing track of Pantera's performance at Mexico's Hell & Heaven Metal Fest on December 2, 2022 as their first performance in 20 years.

== Critical reception ==
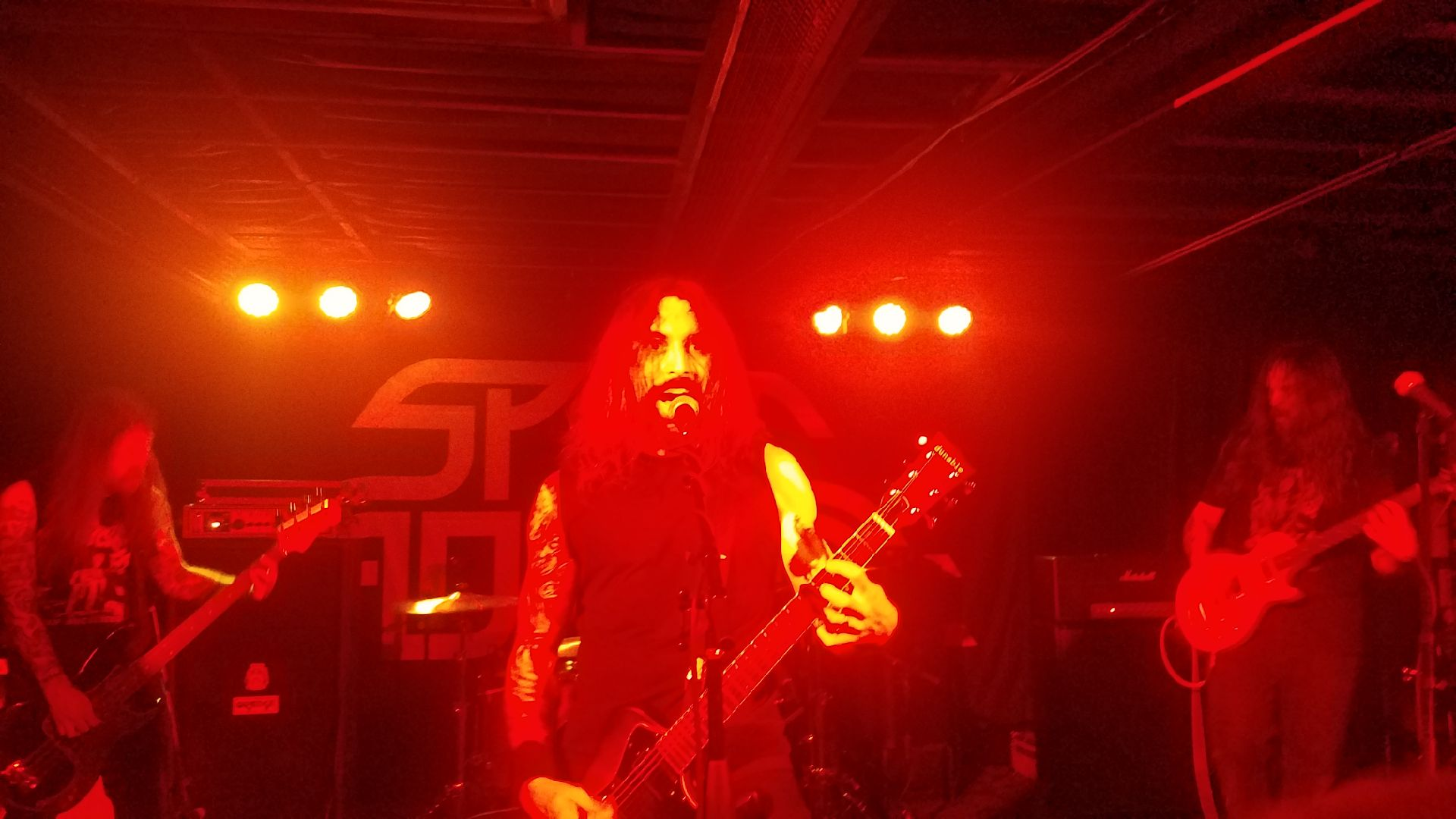
American heavy metal band Spirit Adrift covered the song

Steve Huey of AllMusic praised the song and "This Love" for having "thunderingly loud, aggressive chorus sections", despite being ballads. Greg Pratt of Brave Words & Bloody Knuckles compared the song to "Cemetery Gates, also calling it "amazing" and a "powerful classic." Janiss Garza used the two ballads from Vulgar Display of Power, as proof Pantera "is about much more than macho metal posturing." He adds "Hollow" is "sad but pretty" and the band's "tough edge slashes painfully through deep introspection about personal relationships." Denise Falzon of Exclaim! believes the song "holds new meaning since Dimebag's tragic murder," and sounds a "little cleaner" with "enhanced production quality" on the 20th Anniversary remaster of the album.

Dom Lawson of Classic Rock ranked the song at number 13 on his list of "The 50 best Pantera songs ever" and stated it "brought Vulgar Display… to a close with grandiose audacity. Here, melodic subtleties are many but brutality remains an unerring threat. Jon Hadusek of Consequence called it one of Pantera's "mid-tempo, melodic songs" and that it was a major influence on Nate Garrettm guitarist of American heavy metal band Spirit Adrift, who later covered the song. David Slavković of Ultimate Guitar ranked the song at number 6 on his list of the "Top: 20 Saddest Metal Songs of All Time", and called it a "sad and depressing piece" that contrasts the "serious bangers" on most of Vulgar Display of Power.

== Track listing ==
All tracks are written by Pantera (Phil Anselmo, Diamond Darrell, Rex Brown, Vinnie Paul)

U.S. release
No.	Title	Length
1.	"Hollow" (Edit)	4:59
2.	"Hollow" (LP Version)	5:45
Total length:		10:44

German release
No.	Title	Length
1.	"Hollow" (Radio Edit)	2:58
2.	"By Demons Be Driven"	4:39
3.	"Mouth for War"	3:56
Total length:		11:33

== Personnel ==
Pantera

- Phil Anselmo – vocals
- Diamond Darrell – guitars
- Rex – bass
- Vinnie Paul – drums

Technical

- Terry Date – engineering, mixing, production
- Vinnie Paul – engineering, mixing, production
- Pantera – co-production
- Howie Weinberg – mastering
- Doug Sax – vinyl mastering
- Brad Guice – photography
- Joe Giron – photography
- Bob Defrin – artwork
- Larry Freemantle – design
