= Fucking Hostile =

Promotional single by Pantera

from the album Vulgar Display of Power
- B-side: "Mouth for War"
- Released: 1992
- Recorded: 1991
- Studio: Pantego Sound (Pantego, Texas)
- Genre: Groove metal; thrash metal; hardcore punk
- Length: 2:48
- Label: East West
- Songwriters: Dimebag Darrell; Vinnie Paul; Phil Anselmo; Rex Brown
- Producer: Terry Date

Pantera promotional single chronology
"Hollow" (1992)	"Fucking Hostile" (1992)	"Becoming" (1994)

"Fucking Hostile" is a song by American heavy metal band Pantera that appears as the fourth track on their sixth studio album, Vulgar Display of Power (1992). Written by all four members of the band and produced by Terry Date, the protest song criticizes those who abuse their authority. While the band is often associated with mid-paced groove metal, the song is faster and more punk-influenced, at two minutes and 48 seconds, the shortest on the album.

It was first released as a promotional single by East West in 1992, but failed to chart. It was later released as 12-inch single in the UK. "Fucking Hostile" is considered a live favorite of the band.

== Background and recording ==
In an interview with Revolver, drummer Vinnie Paul stated that recording "Fucking Hostile" flowed "real nice." The distorted vocals were inspired by Nine Inch Nails song "Head Like a Hole" and were achieved with a Tascam 4-track cassette recorder. Producer Terry Date recalled "we were messing around with different techniques to get the right distorted sound," and guitarist Dimebag Darrel got an idea. He went home and returned with the cassette recorder and exclaimed "just run the mic through this and turn the preamp up really high. It distorts really great."

Darrell and Paul's father, Jerry Abbott, who owned Pantego Studio where the band recorded the song, walked in on the band recording the vocals and said "you can't record a vocal like that! They'll never master it." He amended this, also when interviewed by Revolver, "that was the first time I had ever been around the type of music where you recorded something distorted with a purpose. It seemed strange to me, but I guess they proved me wrong."

== Composition and lyrics ==
"Fucking Hostile" is a faster and more punk-influenced take on Pantera's signature groove metal sound. For this reason, and a tempo of 186 beats per minute, the song has also been described as thrash metal and hardcore punk. Chris Chantler of Classic Rock elaborates the song is not "thrash in the 80s sense" but the over the top energy and attitude is "total manic thrash to the max." Jeff Kitts of Revolver compared the song to Black Flag, and noted influences from Ministry and Slayer, while Eli Enis joked it sounded like the word "fuck" transposed into musical form.

"Fucking Hostile" is a protest song that criticizes those who abuse their authority and power, such as political figures, religious leaders and parents. Scott Penfold of Loaded Radio declared that "Anselmo‘s vocals are utterly unhinged, spitting venom against censorship, parental control, and societal restrictions."

== Critical reception ==
Loudwire ranked "Fucking Hostile" the third best Pantera song, and stated it "operates off a punk-rock battery and is one of the band's fastest". Dom Lawson of Metal Hammer ranked the song at number 8 on his list of the 50 best Pantera songs, and writes that it "was so much more extreme than anything else mainstream metal had to offer in 1992 that it took your breath away. Today, it still makes us want to run through a brick wall." Malcolm Dome, also of Metal Hammer, considered it to be among the 10 best Pantera songs of all time.

Billboard included the song on their list "10 of Vinnie Paul's Hardest-Rocking Songs, From Pantera's Picks to Hellyeah's Hits", and declared it proof Paul "was just as great as a straight-ahead thrash drummer, and it's one of the reasons this is one of Pantera's best-known songs." Scott Penfold of Loaded Radio summarized that Pantera "slams the accelerator to the floor" with "Fucking Hostile" after the "mid-tempo stomp" of "Walk".

== Track listing ==
All tracks are written by Pantera (Phil Anselmo, Diamond Darrell, Rex Brown, Vinnie Paul).

No.	Title	Length
1.	"Fucking Hostile"	2:49
2.	"Mouth for War"	3:56
Total length:		6:45

== Personnel ==
- Phil Anselmo – vocals
- Dimebag Darrell – guitar
- Rex Brown – bass
- Vinnie Paul – drums

== Covers ==
The Breeders' guitarist Kelley Deal recorded a solo cover of the song in 2000, which appeared on the benefit compilation Free the West Memphis 3 that same year.

American rock band New Years Day covered "Fucking Hostile" in 2018 on their EP Diary of a Creep. In 2019 the band performed an acoustic cover of the song.

American thrash metal band Slayer performed a cover of the song in Athens, Greece on July 2, 2013 with Anselmo, after he was invited on stage to celebrate his 45th birthday.
