= A New Level =

Song by Pantera

from the album Vulgar Display of Power
- Released: February 25, 1992
- Recorded: 1991
- Genre: Groove metal
- Length: 3:57
- Label: Atco
- Songwriters: Dimebag Darrell; Vinnie Paul; Phil Anselmo; Rex Brown
- Producer: Terry Date

"A New Level" is a song by American heavy metal band Pantera. It is the second track on their 1992 studio album Vulgar Display of Power.

== Background and composition ==
The song is composed in the key of A minor. It was demoed before producer Terry Date came in to work on the album. Pantera's vocalist Phil Anselmo commented about the song: "A New Level was the ultimate chip-on-your-shoulder-type song at the time for me."

Bassist Rex Brown wrote about the song in his book Official Truth, 101 Proof: "Sometimes we'd sit in the studio until four in the morning, just coming up with different ideas... Every single track we recorded had that certain something about it in a way that only the most vital albums can boast. When we did 'A New Level,' there were all these weird chromatic chords that we hadn't even tried before, and as it took shape it was like opening a Christmas present that you never thought you'd get in a million years."

== Reception ==
Metal Hammer ranked "A New Level" #11 on their list of the 50 best Pantera songs. They wrote: "A series of visceral, fidgeting riffs gives way to that immortal chorus: 'A new level of confidence and power...' It pretty much summed up the whole Vulgar Display... album."

Guitar World considered "A New Level" to be the 3rd best Pantera song, writing that it is "arguably as well known as any of the Vulgar Display of Power cuts that were." They also wrote: "Its intro riff, built on a slowly ascending barrage of crushing chromatics, is as iconic as the opening of 'Walk' or 'Mouth for War'".

Guitar World also ranked the song's solo number 5 on their list "The 25 Greatest Wah Solos of All Time".

Revolver Magazine hosted a fan poll on the five best songs from Vulgar Display of Power and "A New Level" came second place.

Spin writer Mike Gitter described the song as "anthemic".

== Madonna performance ==
Pop singer Madonna performed the opening riff from "A New Level" in a medley version of her song "Hung Up" on her Sticky & Sweet Tour; the impetus for including the riff originated from her long-time guitarist, Monte Pittman, who taught her the riff as guitar practice. Anselmo was bemused by this: "She's never reached out to any of us, so I appreciate her homage, but I just don't understand it. But props to her for doing it."

== Personnel ==
- Phil Anselmo – vocals
- Dimebag Darrell – guitar
- Rex Brown – bass
- Vinnie Paul – drums
