= Walk (Pantera EPs) =

1993 extended plays by Pantera

American heavy metal band Pantera released a series of EPs for the song "Walk" in 1993, including Walk Biomechanical, Walk Live Material, and Walk Cervical.

== Walk (EP) ==
Walk

EP by Pantera
- Released: 1993
- Genre: Groove metal
- Length: 29:30
- Label: Atco

Pantera chronology
Vulgar Display of Power (1992)	Walk (1993)	Walk Biomechanical (1993)

Walk was released in Japan only, in 1993 by Atco Records. On May 16, 2012, the EP was made available to purchase digitally in the United States for the first time.

This EP contains six songs. The first four are remixes from the Vulgar Display of Power album, while the last two are live tracks from Cowboys from Hell, recorded live at Foundations Forum in 1990. Those same live tracks were later re-issued in the 2010 reissue of the same album.

Based purely on length, this recording is considered an EP. The parallel releases, Walk Biomechanical and Walk Cervical, are singles, not EPs, owing to their total length.

While this was only a Japanese release, it was also released as disc three in the Driven Downunder Tour '94 Souvenir Collection box set in 1994.

=== Track listing ===
All tracks are written by Pantera.

No.	Title	Length
1.	"Walk (Cervical Edit)"	5:11
2.	"Fucking Hostile (Biomechanical Mix)"	3:58
3.	"By Demons Be Driven (Biomechanical Mix)"	4:17
4.	"Walk (Cervical Dub Extended)"	6:42
5.	"Cowboys from Hell" (live)	4:16
6.	"Heresy" (live)	5:05

== Walk Biomechanical ==
Walk Biomechanical

EP by Pantera
- Released: 1993
- Genre: Groove metal
- Length: 18:20
- Label: Atco

Pantera chronology
Walk (1993)	Walk Biomechanical (1993)	Walk Live Material (1993)

Walk Biomechanical was released in 1993 by Atco Records. It contains four songs from Vulgar Display of Power. The first two are album versions, while the second two have been remixed and renamed by Justin Broadrick of Godflesh.

=== Track listing ===
All tracks are written by Pantera.

No.	Title	Length
1.	"Walk" (album version)	5:16
2.	"No Good (Attack the Radical)"	4:51
3.	"Fucking Hostile (Biomechanical Mix)"	3:57
4.	"By Demons Be Driven (Biomechanical Mix)"	4:16

== Walk Live Material ==
Walk Live Material

EP by Pantera
- Released: 1993
- Recorded: 1991; 1992
- Genre: Groove metal
- Label: Atco
- Producer: Terry Date; Vinnie Paul

Pantera chronology
Walk Biomechanical (1993)	Walk Live Material (1993)	Walk Cervical (1993)

Walk Live Material was released in 1993 by Atco Records. It is a 12" vinyl only release.

This EP contains four songs. The first two are album tracks from Vulgar Display of Power, while the last two are live tracks from Cowboys from Hell.

The tagline on the back of the vinyl is "Recorded September 28th 1991, live at Moscow Monsters of Rock in front of a crowd of 500,000. Definitely no overdubs!"

=== Track listing ===
All tracks are written by Pantera.

Side one
No.	Title	Length
1.	"Walk" (album version)
2.	"No Good (Attack the Radical)"

Side two
No.	Title	Length
1.	"Cowboys from Hell" (live from Moscow)
2.	"Psycho Holiday" (live from Moscow)

== Walk Cervical ==
Walk Cervical

EP by Pantera
- Released: 1993
- Genre: Groove metal
- Length: 21:01
- Label: Atco

Pantera chronology
Walk Live Material (1993)	Walk Cervical (1993)	Hostile Moments (1994)

Walk Cervical was released in 1993 by Atco Records. It contains four songs from Vulgar Display of Power. The first two are album versions, while the second two have been remixed and renamed by JG Thirlwell of Foetus.

=== Track listing ===
All tracks are written by Pantera.

No.	Title	Length
1.	"Walk" (album version)	5:16
2.	"A New Level"	3:59
3.	"Walk (Cervical Dub Extended)"	6:41
4.	"Walk (Cervical Edit)"	5:11

== Personnel ==
Pantera

- Phil Anselmo – vocals
- Dimebag Darrell – guitars
- Rex Brown – bass
- Vinnie Paul – drums

Other

- JG Thirlwell – remixes
- Justin Broadrick – remixes
