= Mouth for War =

1992 single by Pantera

Single by Pantera

from the album Vulgar Display of Power
- Released: September 21, 1992
- Recorded: 1991
- Genre: Groove metal
- Length: 3:56
- Label: Atco
- Songwriters: Dimebag Darrell; Vinnie Paul; Phil Anselmo; Rex Brown
- Producer: Terry Date

Pantera singles chronology
"Psycho Holiday" (1990)	"Mouth for War" (1992)	"This Love" (1992)

Music video
- "Mouth for War" on YouTube

"Mouth for War" is a song by American groove metal band Pantera. It was first released on the band's sixth album Vulgar Display of Power and was the first single off that album. It was later released on the band's compilation album, The Best of Pantera: Far Beyond the Great Southern Cowboys' Vulgar Hits!

The song was released as downloadable content for the music video games Rock Revolution and Rock Band 3, alongside "Walk", "I'm Broken" and "5 Minutes Alone".

== Lyrics and composition ==
Vocalist Phil Anselmo stated in a 1992 interview on Much More Music, that "Mouth for War" is about channeling your hate into something productive. This is evident in the lyrics "When I channel my hate to productive/I don't find it hard to impress". According to Anselmo, the song was written about the then middleweight champion James Toney.

== Music video ==
The video shows the band playing the song to an audience. The majority of the video is shot in black and white, and a screenshot of the video was used as the cover for "Walk". It was directed by Paul Rachman who also directed the videos from the band's previous album, Cowboys from Hell, and the feature documentary film American Hardcore.

== Release and reception ==
"Mouth for War" was the band's first single from their Vulgar Display of Power album. The song is one of Pantera's most popular songs and experienced moderate commercial success, becoming the band's first song to ever chart, reaching number 73 on the UK Singles Chart. It was used as the theme song for MTV's Headbangers Ball.

Metal Hammer ranked the song number 7 on their list of the 50 best Pantera songs.

== Covers ==
In 1993, iD Software composer Bobby Prince created a MIDI rendition of the song for use in their game Doom.

"Mouth for War" has been covered by Italian melodic death metal band Disarmonia Mundi on their third album, Mind Tricks. Another cover version by Biohazard appears in the Metal Hammer tribute to Dimebag Darrell. An instrumental, all-cello version was recorded by The Portland Cello Project on the Kill Rock Stars label. Avenged Sevenfold covered the song live in 2011, featuring Vinnie Paul on drums.

In March 2021, Lzzy Hale of Halestorm, Reba Meyers of Code Orange, Gina Gleason of Baroness, Madi Watkins of Year of the Knife, Ben Koller of All Pigs Must Die and Mutoid Man, and Jordan Olds (aka Gwarsenio Hall) collectively released a cover of the song on the "Two Minutes to Late Night" YouTube channel.

== Personnel ==
- Phil Anselmo – vocals
- Dimebag Darrell – guitar
- Rex Brown – bass
- Vinnie Paul – drums

== Track listing ==
No.	Title	Length
1.	"Mouth for War"	3:57
2.	"Rise"	4:38
3.	"Cowboys from Hell" (live)	4:16
4.	"Heresy" (live)	5:05

== Charts ==
Chart (1992)	Peak position
UK Singles (OCC)	73
