= Domination (song) =

Song by Pantera

from the album Cowboys from Hell
- Released: July 24, 1990
- Recorded: 1989
- Genre: Groove metal; thrash metal
- Length: 5:04
- Label: Atco
- Songwriters: Dimebag Darrell; Vinnie Paul; Phil Anselmo; Rex Brown
- Producer: Terry Date

"Domination" is a song by American heavy metal band Pantera. It is the sixth track on their 1990 studio album Cowboys from Hell. The song is notable for its breakdown, which is widely considered to be the best out of all of Pantera's breakdowns. From 1990 to 1991, it was used as a live set opener.

For the late Dimebag Darrell's birthday in 2022, thrash metal band Anthrax played part of the song at a show.

== Background and composition ==
The song is played in E standard tuning, and has a tempo of 141 beats per minute. According to vocalist Phil Anselmo in an interview with Louder Sound, it was "written in the practice studio"; he also commented, "It was the first time we were gonna actually lay it down after we'd been jamming on it. And we used the first take. It's full of energy and it's very raw."

It was one of the first songs written for the album along with "The Art of Shredding" and "Heresy".

Drummer Vinnie Paul claims to have recorded the entire song in the first take.

== "Dom/Hollow" ==
A live medley with the song and "Hollow", known as "Dom/Hollow", "Domination/Hollow" or "Domination & Hollow", is a staple of Pantera's live concerts. The band starts with "Domination", but leads into the ending of "Hollow" (which is roughly the last two minutes and 30 seconds of the album version). The medley was first played on May 31, 1992 at Five Flags Center in Dubuque, Iowa, but gained popularity as the ninth track on the live album, Official Live: 101 Proof (1997). When reviewing the album, Carl Fisher of GAMES, BRRRAAAINS & A HEAD-BANGING LIFE thought "the idea to combine several songs into one was genius." "Dom/Hollow" was also the closing track of Pantera's performance at Mexico's Hell & Heaven Metal Fest on December 2, 2022 as their first performance in 20 years.

== Reception ==
Loudwire ranked the song number 2 on their 10 Best Pantera Songs list. Loudwire also ranked the song number 1 on their "Five Pantera Breakdowns That Will Seriously F--K You Up" list.

The song was ranked number 12 on Revolver's 25 Greatest Pantera Songs list. They described it as "a frantic Cowboys cut that featured a gargantuan breakdown in the final minute that was clearly intended to tear down the house."

Guitar World ranked the song number 13 on their 25 Greatest Pantera Songs list, describing the song being played live: "as it was guaranteed to immediately whip a crowd into a batshit-crazy frenzy"

ManiacsOnline placed the song at number 2 on their Top 10 Pantera Songs list, describing the breakdown "The star of the show here is the monstrous breakdown at the end of the song that sees Dimebag shred up an absolute storm over a simple, crushing chug pattern."

== Personnel ==
- Phil Anselmo – vocals
- Dimebag Darrell – guitars
- Rex Brown – bass
- Vinnie Paul – drums
