= Drag the Waters =

Single by Pantera

from the album The Great Southern Trendkill
- Released: April 15, 1996
- Recorded: 1995
- Genre: Groove metal; sludge metal
- Length: 4:55
- Label: East West
- Songwriters: Dimebag Darrell; Vinnie Paul; Phil Anselmo; Rex Brown
- Producers: Terry Date; Vinnie Paul

Pantera singles chronology
"Becoming" (1994)	"Drag the Waters" (1996)	"Cat Scratch Fever" (1999)

"Drag the Waters" is a song by the American heavy metal band Pantera. It first appeared on the 1996 album The Great Southern Trendkill, and later on the band's compilation album, The Best of Pantera: Far Beyond the Great Southern Cowboys' Vulgar Hits!.

Pantera guitarist Dimebag Darrell has said that this song "is about a lifetime of dealing with people that you can't tell what they're really comin' at you for, or what their motives really are. You've got to drag the waters to get to the bottom and find out the truth."

== Music video ==
This song is the first single released from the album, and the only one to have a music video. The video was directed by Darrell.

== Reception ==
Metal Hammer ranked "Drag the Waters" No. 18 on their list of the 50 best Pantera songs. Guitar World ranked "Drag the Waters" No. 8 on their ranking of the 25 greatest Pantera songs.
