= Rock Revolution =

2008 video game

- Developers: Zoë Mode; HB Studios
- Publisher: Konami
- Platforms: Nintendo DS, PlayStation 3, Wii, Xbox 360
- Release: NA: 15 October 2008 (DS, PS3, 360); NA: 11 November 2008 (Wii); EU: 15 May 2009 (DS); EU: 22 May 2009 (360)
- Genre: Music video game
- Modes: Single-player, multiplayer

Rock Revolution is a music video game developed by Zoë Mode and HB Studios and published by Konami. The game was released on 15 October 2008 for the Nintendo DS, PlayStation 3, Wii and Xbox 360. As with similar titles, the game uses various controllers to simulate the performance of rock music, primarily using guitar and drum controllers on its PlayStation 3 and Xbox 360 versions.

Rock Revolution received generally negative reviews from critics, who felt that the game was an inferior clone of the Guitar Hero and Rock Band franchises with no distinguishing characteristics to set it apart from its competition; particularly the design of its drum kit controller, the game's interface, and its soundtrack of mostly cover versions as its worst aspects. The game experienced low sales numbers in its first month, selling around 3,000 copies.

== Gameplay ==
Gameplay in Rock Revolution revolves around players attempting to simulate the playing of rock music using special instrument shaped controllers. Scrolling notes onscreen indicate the pattern and timing of buttons that must be pushed on the guitar or pads hit on the drum kit. Songs can feature "fill boxes" and "roll boxes" on drum charts, and hammer-on/pull-off's and "shred boxes" (must be strummed constantly for the duration) on guitar charts. Score multipliers are increased through larger combos, and a temporary bonus period can be activated when the player's lifebar, the "atmosphere meter", is maxed out.

On the Wii version, players instead use the Wii Remote and Nunchuk as air instruments—playing the songs by performing specific gestures and movements. Guitar and drum controllers for the Wii are not usable with the game. The DS version utilizes the touch screen and microphone, utilizing gestured movements for guitar play, playing a virtual drum kit on the touch screen itself with the stylus for drums, and the system's internal microphone for vocals.

Various game modes are featured in Rock Revolution. The game's career mode follows the career of the player's band, recording albums and playing live shows. These stages can feature specific challenges, such as reaching a certain score, performing a song without seeing the notes, avoiding false "poison notes", or completing songs with a limited number of mistakes. Local and online multiplayer is also offered on the console versions, including co-op and battle modes. A "Recording studio" sandbox mode is also available, where players can create their own songs with various options, such as different guitar and drum styles, chords, fills, and beats. Songs created in this mode however, cannot be played as a song in-game.

== Development ==
Konami had been known for their Bemani series of music simulation games in Japan. In particular, Konami's guitar simulation game GuitarFreaks (and its obscurity outside of Asia) influenced the American video game developer Harmonix to produce their own similar game, Guitar Hero. Konami filed for a trademark in the United States on the name "Guitar Revolution" on 29 June 2006. With a name patterned off Konami's own Dance Dance Revolution and Karaoke Revolution franchises, the trademark filing led to speculation that Konami was developing its own competitor to the Guitar Hero series.

Rock Revolution would be officially announced and presented by Konami at a press event in San Francisco on 15 May 2008. An early version of the game was demonstrated at the event, featuring songs by Twisted Sister, Avril Lavigne, The Ramones, and Quiet Riot, among other tracks. The Xbox 360 version was demonstrated with guitar controllers from Guitar Hero, but a newly designed drum controller specifically designed for Rock Revolution was also demonstrated. Associate product manager Mondona Akhazan stated that Rock Revolution would be a more drum-focused game, by contrast to other band games, which developers felt were putting more focus on the role of the guitarists. As such the Rock Revolution drum kit featured a layout containing 6 drum pads (as opposed to the four-pad layout used by Rock Band and Guitar Hero's five-pad layout), the largest being a snare drum located directly in front of the player.

The Wii and Nintendo DS versions would not use guitar and drum controllers; instead, the Wii version uses the Wii Remote and Nunchuck as air instruments, and the Nintendo DS version uses a touchscreen and internal microphone to play instruments and vocals, respectively. The ability to play as a vocalist remained exclusive to the DS version, as Konami felt including this feature in console versions could potentially affect the Karaoke Revolution series.

In September 2008, Konami officially confirmed that there would be no specific guitar controller made for Rock Revolution, and that both guitar and drum peripherals utilized by the Guitar Hero and Rock Band series would be compatible with the game's Xbox 360 and PlayStation 3 versions; drum patterns would automatically be modified based on what controller a player is using. In a June 2008 interview, Konami's associate producer Keith Matejka had felt that there should be better compatibility between the peripherals used by recent music games, believing these different controllers only provided "slightly different" experiences from each other and that they were expensive to manufacture and purchase. Both Sony and Microsoft later announced the controllers for Guitar Hero World Tour and Rock Band 2 would be interchangeable between each other and Rock Revolution.

In the lead-up to the release of Rock Revolution, reports surfaced on 10 July 2008 that Konami filed a lawsuit against Harmonix and Viacom for patent infringement over Rock Band at the United States District Court for the Eastern District of Texas, claiming it infringed on Konami's patents on music simulation games. They also requested cash compensation and an order to stop sales of Rock Band. In February 2009, Harmonix sued Konami for infringing on their patents in Rock Revolution; the patents in question had cited some of Konami's patents as references. The two companies reached a settlement over the dispute in September 2010, the terms of which were not disclosed.

== Soundtrack ==
Rock Revolution contains 41 songs on the Xbox 360, Wii and PlayStation 3 and 20 songs on the Nintendo DS. The majority of the songs are covers of original recordings (the exceptions being "Given Up" by Linkin Park, and "Paralyzer" by Finger Eleven).

=== Console song list ===
Title	Artist
"All My Life"	Foo Fighters
"All The Small Things"	Blink-182
"Am I Evil?"	Metallica
"Are You Gonna Be My Girl"	Jet
"Bad Reputation"	Joan Jett
"Blitzkrieg Bop"	Ramones
"Chop Suey!"	System of a Down
"Cum on Feel the Noize"	Quiet Riot
"Dance, Dance"	Fall Out Boy
"Detroit Rock City"	Kiss
"The Diary of Jane"	Breaking Benjamin
"Dirty Little Secret"	All-American Rejects
"Dr. Feelgood"	Mötley Crüe
"The End of Heartache"	Killswitch Engage
"Falling Away from Me"	Korn
"Given Up"	Linkin Park
"Heading Out to the Highway"	Judas Priest
"Highway Star"	Deep Purple
"Holy Wars...The Punishment Due"	Megadeth
"Joker & the Thief"	Wolfmother
"Kiss Me Deadly"	Lita Ford
"Last Resort"	Papa Roach
"Magic Man"	Heart
"No One Like You"	Scorpions
"Our Truth"	Lacuna Coil
"Pain"	Three Days Grace
"Paralyzer"	Finger Eleven
"Pull Me Under"	Dream Theater
"Round and Round"	Ratt
"Run to the Hills"	Iron Maiden
"Sk8er Boi"	Avril Lavigne
"Somebody Told Me"	The Killers
"The Spirit of Radio"	Rush
"Spoonman"	Soundgarden
"Still of the Night"	Whitesnake
"Stone Cold Crazy"	Queen
"Walk"	Pantera
"We're Not Gonna Take It"	Twisted Sister
"White Room"	Cream
"Won't Get Fooled Again"	The Who
"Youth Gone Wild"	Skid Row

=== Downloadable content ===
In addition to the 41 songs in the main setlist, the PlayStation 3 and Xbox 360 versions of the game also support new songs as downloadable content. Also, all songs in packs can be downloaded individually. All songs were available on both PlayStation Network and Xbox Live unless otherwise noted.

Only two packs have been released, one featuring music by artists from Konami's Bemani music games and one featuring music by heavy metal band Pantera.

Title	Artist	Release date	Single / Pack name
"No Pain, No Gain"	The Rock Revolution Band	24 October 2008	Single
"She's The Bug"	The Rock Revolution Band	24 October 2008	Single
"Death Real"	Des-ROW	13 November 2008	Bemani Track Pack
"My Only Shining Star"	Naoki Maeda remixed by Kuro	13 November 2008	Bemani Track Pack
"Model DD8"	Mutsuhiko Izumi	13 November 2008	Bemani Track Pack
"Progressive Baby"	Daisuke Kurosawa	13 November 2008	Bemani Track Pack
"CHIMERA"	Daisuke Kurosawa	13 November 2008	Bemani Track Pack
"5 Minutes Alone"	Pantera	14 January 2009	Pantera Track Pack
"Mouth for War"	Pantera	14 January 2009	Pantera Track Pack
"Cemetery Gates"	Pantera	14 January 2009	Pantera Track Pack
"This Love"	Pantera	14 January 2009	Pantera Track Pack
"I'm Broken"	Pantera	14 January 2009	Pantera Track Pack

== Reception ==
Reception

Aggregate score
Aggregator	Score
Metacritic	38/100

Review scores
Publication	Score
1Up.com	D
Eurogamer	3/10
G4	2/5
Game Informer	7/10
GameSpot	3.5/10
IGN	3.0/10 (PS3/Xbox 360); 4.1/10 (DS)
Official Xbox Magazine (US)	4.0/10
TeamXbox	4.6/10

The PS3 and Xbox 360 versions of Rock Revolution hold an aggregate score of 38/100 on Metacritic, indicating "generally unfavorable reviews". Critics compared the game to Guitar Hero and Rock Band by acknowledging general shortcomings and differences, such as its on-screen presentation of notes (eschewing the angled "highway" originating from Guitar Hero for a flat, vertical tablature-like display similar to the GuitarFreaks series, and the bass pedal on drums being represented by a separate lane, rather than as a bar stretching across the entire track like on Rock Band), as well as the layout and size of the pads on the game's drum controller. Rock Revolution was also criticized for having a soundtrack smaller than that of its competition and consisting almost entirely of cover versions (in contrast to Guitar Hero World Tour and Rock Band 2, which both featured only master recordings).

GameSpot criticized aspects of Rock Revolution's core gameplay, including the presentation of notes (arguing that it gives less time for players to react), inaccurate song charting, and "unusually small" timing windows. The career mode was also criticized for lacking narrative or character customization and for being the "one redeeming mode" of the game (but noting that songs created in the mode couldn't be played or shared in-game, unlike in Guitar Hero World Tour). In conclusion, it was argued that Rock Revolution did not live up to the expectation of quality associated with Konami's other rhythm games and that "if Rock Revolution came out two or three years ago, it might have been revolutionary, but in 2008, it's not even relevant".

Game Informer acknowledged that while there was a "temptation" to negatively compare the game to the more-established Guitar Hero and Rock Band franchises, Rock Revolution was still "pretty enjoyable at times", and had a "stellar" song list despite its "awful" covers. However, some of its modes (such as the music studio) were described as being "laughably bare bones". A Kotaku writer felt that the setup of the drum controller felt more natural and realistic than that of Rock Band but that the cymbals were hard to hit due to their size and lack of elevation.

IGN felt that Rock Revolution "[failed] on nearly every count" in comparison to the "ubiquitous" Guitar Hero and Rock Band franchises, criticizing its "uninviting" presentation and poorly-animated crowds, the drum controller's awkward layout and unresponsive pads, and the recording studio mode for being "as intuitive as a tax form". The game did, however, receive praise for its compatibility with existing controllers, some of its song selections (such as "Cum On Feel the Noize" and "Kiss Me Deadly"), as well as the "arcade-like" challenges and ability to improvise guitar solos in career mode. In conclusion, Rock Revolution, despite its redeeming qualities, was considered a "step backward" for the genre.

IGN also reviewed the DS version, giving it a 4.1/10, specifically criticizing its low-quality gameplay in comparison to Guitar Hero: On Tour, characters for having limited animation and "looking like rejects from old Hanna-Barbera cartoons", and for its small, low quality, and uncredited soundtrack. RewiredMind.com's Ken Barnes cited inaccurate controls and the limitations of the Nintendo DS hardware in the vocal sections for a low score in his review of the Nintendo DS version, but applauded the game's developers for attempting to implement vocal gameplay on the DS. Barnes also noted that he only reviewed the DS version of the game because of "the prohibitive cost of importing the awful-looking PS3 or Xbox 360 drum 'kit'."

=== Sales ===
The NPD Group reported that Rock Revolution sold fewer than 3,000 copies in October 2008 in the United States across the Xbox 360, PlayStation 3, and Nintendo DS versions in the game's first month of release, as opposed to the 534,000 copies of Guitar Hero World Tour sold within the same period.

== See also ==
- List of music video games
- GuitarFreaks and DrumMania
- Power Gig: Rise of the SixString
