= Dom/Hollow =

Dom/Hollow may refer to:

- "Domination" (song), a 1990 song by Pantera from the album Cowboys from Hell
- "Hollow" (Pantera song), a 1992 song by Pantera from the album Vulgar Display of Power
- "Dom/Hollow", a medley of both songs from the album Official Live: 101 Proof
