= The Art of Shredding =

Song by Pantera

from the album Cowboys from Hell
- Released: July 24, 1990
- Recorded: 1990
- Genre: Groove metal; thrash metal
- Length: 4:20
- Label: Atco
- Songwriter(s): Dimebag Darrell; Vinnie Paul; Phil Anselmo; Rex Brown
- Producer(s): Terry Date

"The Art of Shredding" is a song by the American heavy metal band Pantera. It was released in 1990 on their fifth studio album Cowboys from Hell, and is the twelfth and final song on the album.

== Background ==
The song was composed in the key of D minor. Vocalist Phil Anselmo's voice ranges in pitch from Bb3 to G5. "The Art of Shredding" is an example of Pantera changing sound from their 1980s glam metal style.

It was the first song that Pantera wrote for the album.

== Reception ==
In the book The Rough Guide to Rock, Peter Buckley wrote that the song's riffs gave Metallica "a run for their money".

Metal Hammer ranked "The Art of Shredding" the 23rd best Pantera song. They wrote: "An avalanche of jagged, churning riffs met Anselmo's rallying cry of 'It's only emotion!' and metal was noisily reborn."

Guitar World ranked "The Art of Shredding" the 10th best Pantera song, writing that "with its rollercoaster ride of whiplash riffs and rhythms", it is one of the most enjoyable songs from Cowboys from Hell. They also wrote: "Dimebag tops off the proceedings with a gonzo, whammy-filled solo that ably demonstrates that shredding is, in fact, very much an art."

== Personnel ==
- Phil Anselmo – vocals
- Diamond Darrell – guitars
- Rex Brown – bass
- Vinnie Paul – drums
