= Official Live: 101 Proof =

Live album by Pantera
- Released: July 29, 1997
- Recorded: 1996–1997 (live tracks); May 1997 (original tracks)
- Genre: Groove metal
- Length: 76:23
- Labels: Elektra; East West
- Producers: Vinnie Paul; Dimebag Darrell

Pantera chronology
The Singles 1991–1996 (1996)	Official Live: 101 Proof (1997)	Reinventing the Steel (2000)

Singles from Official Live: 101 Proof
- 1. "Where You Come From" Released: 1997

Official Live: 101 Proof is a live album by American heavy metal band Pantera, released on July 29, 1997.

== Content ==
The first 14 tracks are live recordings of songs from previously released studio albums, starting with Cowboys from Hell. The last two songs ("Where You Come From" and "I Can't Hide") are new studio recordings.

Drummer Vinnie Paul stated:

"We recorded the new material during a break in our tour. We recorded them in 12 days. It was a great feeling to get back in the studio again. Especially when we knew the songs were going to go on an album that is so important for us and our fans. We felt like after 7 years of playing live, that we wanted to put out a record with all our best tunes. Songs that have our own TLC instead of all that foolishness that happens when a band puts out a greatest hits album or some overdubbed live album."

The track "Dom/Hollow" is an amalgamation of parts of "Domination" (originally from Cowboys from Hell) and "Hollow" (originally from Vulgar Display of Power). The band played "Domination" leading into "Hollow" virtually every time they played either song live.

The track "Hostile" is simply a live version of "Fucking Hostile" (from Vulgar Display of Power) with a shortened title.

During the song "Becoming", the band would end the song with the outro of "Throes of Rejection" from their album Far Beyond Driven. Likewise, the band ended "I'm Broken" with the outro of "By Demons Be Driven" from the album Vulgar Display of Power.

Official footage exists of the live portion that was meant for the next home video that has yet to come out.

== Artwork ==
The album cover is a visual reference to the "Jack Daniel's Tennessee Whiskey" bottle label, with "101 Proof" referring to alcohol content the same as that of "Wild Turkey Bourbon" and "No. 5" again referring to the brand (like Jack Daniel's Old No. 7 brand), and the fact that the band considered this their fifth "official" release (starting with Cowboys from Hell and not counting their four earlier independent albums).

== Release and reception ==
Professional ratings
Review scores
Source	Rating
AllMusic	3/5 stars
Chicago Tribune	3.5/4 stars
Chronicles of Chaos	(3/10)
Rolling Stone	3/5 stars

Official Live: 101 Proof reached number 15 on the Billboard 200 chart with the album receiving solid reviews, and stayed on the chart up to 12 weeks.

Writing in the NME, Stephen Dalton said that "it's brutal, uncomfortable and screamingly intense - but sometimes nothing else will do", giving it a ten out of ten "on one level" but "on every other level", a zero.

== Track listing ==
All tracks are written by Pantera.

No.	Title	Length
1.	"A New Level" (listed as "New Level")	4:24
2.	"Walk"	5:50
3.	"Becoming"	3:59
4.	"5 Minutes Alone"	5:36
5.	"Sandblasted Skin"	4:29
6.	"Suicide Note Pt. 2"	4:20
7.	"War Nerve"	5:21
8.	"Strength Beyond Strength"	3:37
9.	"Dom/Hollow"	3:43
10.	"This Love"	6:57
11.	"I'm Broken"	4:27
12.	"Cowboys from Hell"	4:35
13.	"Cemetery Gates"	7:53
14.	"Fucking Hostile" (listed as "Hostile")	3:56
15.	"Where You Come From" (studio recording)	5:11
16.	"I Can't Hide" (studio recording)	2:16
Total length:		76:23

== Personnel ==
- Phil Anselmo – lead vocals
- Dimebag Darrell – guitar, backing vocals, production
- Rex Brown – bass, backing vocals
- Vinnie Paul – drums, production

== Charts ==
Chart (1997)	Peak position
Australian Albums (ARIA)	19
Austrian Albums (Ö3 Austria)	46
Canada Top Albums/CDs (RPM)	42
Dutch Albums (Album Top 100)	59
Finnish Albums (Suomen virallinen lista)	16
French Albums (SNEP)	24
German Albums (Offizielle Top 100)	84
Hungarian Albums (MAHASZ)	28
New Zealand Albums (RMNZ)	19
Norwegian Albums (VG-lista)	36
Scottish Albums (Official Charts)	75
Swedish Albums (Sverigetopplistan)	32
UK Albums (Official Charts)	54
UK Rock & Metal Albums (Official Charts)	3
US Billboard 200	15

== Certifications ==
Region	Certification	Certified units/sales
Australia (ARIA)	Gold	35,000^{^}
United Kingdom (BPI)	Silver	60,000^{‡}
United States (RIAA)	Gold	500,000^{^}
^{^} Shipments figures based on certification alone.^{‡} Sales+streaming figures based on certification alone.
