= This Love (Pantera song) =

Promotional single by Pantera

from the album Vulgar Display of Power
- Released: June 1992
- Recorded: 1991
- Genre: Groove metal
- Length: 6:32
- Label: Atco
- Songwriter(s): Dimebag Darrell; Vinnie Paul; Phil Anselmo; Rex Brown
- Producer(s): Terry Date

Pantera promotional single chronology
"Cemetery Gates" (1990)	"This Love" (1992)	"Hollow" (1992)

"This Love" is a song by American heavy metal band Pantera. A power ballad, it was first released on the band's best-selling album, 1992's Vulgar Display of Power, and later on the band's compilation album, The Best of Pantera: Far Beyond the Great Southern Cowboys' Vulgar Hits! A live version was also included on Official Live: 101 Proof.

== Composition and lyrics ==
The song begins with a chorus guitar riff played, and the song soon becomes heavier occasionally. Drummer Vinnie Paul has said that this song was about a relationship vocalist Phil Anselmo had been in previously. "This Love was pretty much the story of a relationship he had been in, and he was really mad about it!".

== Reception ==
"This Love" is one of the band's most well-known songs.

Metal Hammer ranked the song number 10 on their list of the 50 best Pantera songs, writing that it "starts in pretty, elegant mode before erupting into a mad-eyed bar brawl of a chorus."

Loudwire ranked "This Love" number seven on their list of the 10 best Pantera songs.

Guitar World ranked the song number five on their ranking of the 25 best Pantera songs.

== Music video ==
The music video for "This Love" was directed by Kevin Kerslake and shows the band playing on a rooftop in Los Angeles while smoke drifts over them. The chorus shows the band inside, playing on a stage, cutting between this and the rooftop. Phil Anselmo can be seen wearing a Down T-shirt. In a subplot, prostitution is shown with several prostitutes are doing random activities (such as seducing a man and another taking off a wig). This culminates when a particular prostitute gets into a cab which is occupied by another man, who tries to rape her. From the last moments of the video, it appears that she kills him, because she is seen dragging him from the cab and leaving him by the roadside.

== Track listing ==
No.	Title	Length
1.	"This Love (AOR edit)"	4:44
2.	"This Love (video edit)"	4:54
3.	"This Love" (LP version)	6:36

== Appearances in media ==
- The 1994 computer game Doom II: Hell on Earth rearranges a portion of this song, used on Maps 18 and 27.
- The music video for this song appeared on MTV's Beavis and Butt-Head and is available on The Mike Judge Collection, Volume 1.
- In 1994, comedy punk band the Radioactive Chicken Heads (then known as Joe and the Chicken Heads) recorded a parody cover called "This Lunch".
- The song was released as downloadable content for Rock Revolution and Rocksmith 2014.

== Personnel ==
- Phil Anselmo – vocals
- Dimebag Darrell – guitars
- Rex Brown – bass
- Vinnie Paul – drums
