= Walk (Pantera song) =

1993 single by Pantera

Single by Pantera

from the album Vulgar Display of Power
- Released: February 15, 1993
- Recorded: 1991
- Genre: Groove metal
- Length: 5:15
- Label: East West
- Songwriters: Dimebag Darrell; Vinnie Paul; Phil Anselmo; Rex Brown
- Producer: Terry Date

Pantera singles chronology
"This Love" (1992)	"Walk" (1993)	"I'm Broken" (1994)

Music video
- "Walk" on YouTube

"Walk" is a song by American heavy metal band Pantera from their sixth album Vulgar Display of Power. A live performance of "Walk" is included on Official Live: 101 Proof, and the studio version is also on the band's greatest hits album, The Best of Pantera: Far Beyond the Great Southern Cowboys' Vulgar Hits!.

== Song information ==
The riff for "Walk" is played in a time signature of 12/8. Dimebag Darrell played the riff at a soundcheck during the tour for Cowboys from Hell and the rest of the band loved it.

Vocalist Phil Anselmo said that the message of the song was "Take your fucking attitude and take a fuckin' walk with that. Keep that shit away from me". His message was aimed at friends that treated the band differently when they arrived home after touring for Cowboys from Hell. He said "they thought it had gone to our heads, like we've got this rock-star thing embroidered across our faces".

The music video was shot at the Riviera Theatre in Chicago.

In 2019, the song was prominently featured in the film Triple Frontier.

Wrestler Rob Van Dam used the song as his entrance music during his time in Extreme Championship Wrestling.

"Walk" was included on the soundtrack for the 2022 film Sonic the Hedgehog 2.

== Release ==
The song was released as the fourth and final single from Pantera's Vulgar Display of Power album in 1993. The band also released a number of EPs and remixes for the song in 1993, including:

- Walk
- Walk Biomechanical
- Walk Live Material
- Walk Cervical

== Reception and accolades ==
The song is considered to be one of the band's best tracks and is also one of the band's most well known songs to both Pantera fans and casual listeners. The song is the most viewed Pantera song on YouTube, with over 284 million views as of 2024. In March 2023, Rolling Stone ranked "Walk" at number 29 on their "100 Greatest Heavy Metal Songs of All Time" list. The song ranked number 16 on VH1's 40 Greatest Metal Songs. Guitar World magazine voted the song's solo the 57th greatest of all time. The song peaked at number 35 on the UK Singles Chart, becoming the band's first UK top 40 hit.

== Personnel ==
Pantera

- Phil Anselmo – vocals
- Diamond Darrell – guitars
- Rex Brown – bass
- Vinnie Paul – drums, engineering, mixing, production

Technical

- Terry Date – engineering, mixing, production
- Howie Weinberg – mastering
- Doug Sax – vinyl mastering

== Notable covers ==
"Walk"

Single by Avenged Sevenfold

from the album Live in the LBC & Diamonds in the Rough
- Released: July 17, 2007
- Recorded: 2007
- Genre: Groove metal
- Length: 5:23
- Label: Warner Bros.
- Producers: Avenged Sevenfold; Terry Date

Avenged Sevenfold singles chronology
"Seize the Day" (2006)	"Walk" (2007)	"Critical Acclaim" (2007)

- Sully Erna, singer of Godsmack, performed the song with Pantera members which is found on their DVD Smack This!.
- Avenged Sevenfold's cover of the song was released as a single to promote their live album Live in the LBC & Diamonds in the Rough. It was released as the first single on the album. However, the song was originally recorded for the band's first DVD, All Excess.
- American heavy metal band Kilgore covered the song for American wrestling promotion Extreme Championship Wrestling, since one of their most popular wrestlers, Rob Van Dam used both Pantera's and Kilgore's versions of "Walk".
- Front Line Assembly sampled the main riff in their 1994 single "Surface Patterns".

== Charts ==
Chart (1993)	Peak position
UK Singles (Official Charts)	35

== Certifications ==
Region	Certification	Certified units/sales
New Zealand (RMNZ)	2× Platinum	60,000^{‡}
^{‡} Sales+streaming figures based on certification alone.
