= 5 Minutes Alone =

Single by Pantera

from the album Far Beyond Driven
- Released: 1994
- Recorded: 1993
- Genre: Groove metal
- Length: 5:50
- Label: East West
- Songwriters: Dimebag Darrell; Vinnie Paul; Phil Anselmo; Rex Brown
- Producers: Terry Date; Vinnie Paul

Pantera singles chronology
"Planet Caravan" (1994)	"5 Minutes Alone" (1994)	"Becoming" (1994)

"5 Minutes Alone" is a song by American heavy metal band Pantera from their 1994 album Far Beyond Driven. The song also appears on the band's live album. The song was released as downloadable content for Rock Revolution and Rock Band 3 and can be heard during a cut-scene in Tom Clancy's Ghost Recon: Future Soldier.

== Meaning ==
Speaking about what the song is about, Pantera's drummer Vinnie Paul said:

"The story behind this song is we were opening for Megadeth, and there was a guy that was flipping us off the whole show and so we stopped the show. And I was like, 'Listen, in case you haven't noticed there's 18,000 people who really dig what we're doing. You're the only one doing that stupid shit without even having to egg the crowd on.' Ten guys just jumped the guy and beat the shit out of him. His dad called the manager after all the lawsuits and this and that, and basically said, 'Give me five minutes with that Phil Anselmo guy. I want to whup his ass.' "

Pantera's vocalist Phil Anselmo spoke about what the song is about saying:

"There are always gold-diggers out there. The way I remember it was there was this kid that swore that I jumped off the stage and beat him up. Well, that was bullshit. That did not happen at all. When the father asked for five minutes alone with me, our manager responded aptly and perfectly: 'No, you don't.' [Laughs] 'I really doubt that,' and basically hung up on the guy. But once that story was conveyed to me, it actually made me angry because it wasn't fucking true. I basically plucked out those words from my agitator's mouth and yeah, man, 'five minutes alone,' fucking bring it."

== Reception ==
Upon release, the song had an immediate impact on the band's fanbase, quickly becoming one of Pantera's most popular songs.

Metal Hammer ranked "5 Minutes Alone" number six on their list of the 50 best Pantera songs.

== Covers ==
"5 Minutes Alone" was covered by the bands Lamb of God, Ill Nino, DevilDriver, Soilwork, and Killswitch Engage in Dallas, Texas on December 8, 2007, on the 3rd anniversary of Dimebag Darrell's death. It featured 3 vocalists, 5 guitarists, and 3 drummers.

The song was covered by Nonpoint for the Metal Hammer tribute album Getcha Pull! A Tribute to Dimebag Darrell as a downloadable bonus track. Nonpoint then released the song on their 2010 studio album Miracle.

Texas deathcore band Upon a Burning Body recorded the song as well. It can be heard as another bonus track for Getcha Pull! A Tribute to Dimebag Darrell

Florida deathcore band Traitors covered the song as well, and is posted on their Bandcamp.

Australian Crossover thrash band S.M.D covered the song and released a recording on their 2026 debut studio album.

== Charts ==
Chart performance for "5 Minutes Alone"
Chart (1994)	Peak position
Australia (ARIA)	76
