= Revolution Is My Name =

Single by Pantera

from the album Reinventing the Steel
- Released: January 2000
- Recorded: 1999
- Genre: Groove metal
- Length: 5:19 (album version); 4:09 (radio edit)
- Label: East West
- Songwriters: Phil Anselmo; Vinnie Paul; Dimebag Darrell; Rex Brown
- Producers: Pantera; Sterling Winfield

Pantera singles chronology
"Cat Scratch Fever" (1999)	"Revolution Is My Name" (2000)	"Goddamn Electric" (2000)

Music video
- "Revolution Is My Name" on YouTube

"Revolution Is My Name" is a song by American heavy metal band Pantera. It was the first single from the band's final album, Reinventing the Steel. It was also included on the band's compilation album Far Beyond the Great Southern Cowboys' Vulgar Hits!.

== Release and reception ==
"Revolution Is My Name" reached number 28 on the Billboard's Mainstream Rock Tracks. The song was nominated for Best Metal Performance in the 2001 Grammys, but lost to Deftones' "Elite". However, it won a 2000 Metal Edge Readers' Choice Award for Song of the Year. The song's music video was voted as the 15th Greatest Metal Video of the 21st Century on Headbangers Ball in 2005.

== Music video ==
The music video for the song was directed by Jim Van Bebber and produced by Grant Cihlar for 1171 Production Group. The video is a mix of different elements: between performances by the band and live footage. It also includes comical snippets of a sitcom-like interpretation of the band's childhood, in which the musicians are portrayed as small children (with facial hair) listening to Led Zeppelin and ZZ Top while jumping on the bed and playing oversized instruments. The video also includes flashes of the band's influences, such as Black Sabbath and Kiss.

== Track listing ==
Promo single

No.	Title	Length
1.	"Revolution Is My Name" (radio edit)	4:09
2.	"Revolution Is My Name" (album version)	5:19

Extended play (EP)

All tracks are written by Pantera, except where noted.

No.	Title	Writer(s)	Length
1.	"Revolution Is My Name" (radio edit)		4:09
2.	"Hole in the Sky" (Black Sabbath cover)	Ozzy Osbourne; Tony Iommi; Geezer Butler; Bill Ward	4:17
3.	"Immortally Insane"		5:13
4.	"Cat Scratch Fever" (Ted Nugent cover)	Ted Nugent	3:51

== Charts ==
Chart (2000)	Peak position
US Mainstream Rock (Billboard)	28
