= Dimevision =

Series of videos about Dimebag Darrell

Dimevision is a series of videos that document "Dimebag" Darrell Abbott's career as a musician. The series' first installment, Dimevision Vol. One - "That's The Fun I Have...", was released on May 2, 2006, containing video clips of Darrell during his stints with Pantera and Damageplan, as well as earlier material. The series was produced by his brother, Vinnie Paul. The sequel, Roll with It or Get Rolled Over, was expected to be released in 2008, but would not become available until December 15, 2017.
