= Rebel Meets Rebel =

Studio album by David Allan Coe with Dimebag Darrell, Vinnie Paul and Rex Brown
- Released: May 2, 2006
- Recorded: 1999–2003
- Length: 40:23
- Label: Big Vin
- Producers: Dimebag Darrell, Vinnie Paul

David Allan Coe chronology
All I'll Ever Be (2005)	Rebel Meets Rebel (2006)	DAC's Back (2010)

Professional ratings
Review scores
Source	Rating
AllMusic	4/5 stars

Rebel Meets Rebel is a collaborative album by American country singer David Allan Coe and Dimebag Darrell, Rex Brown, and Vinnie Paul, members of the American heavy metal band Pantera. The music was written and recorded by the band when the musicians had time aside from their other projects, including Pantera's world tour supporting Reinventing the Steel.

The album was released on May 2, 2006, under Vinnie Paul's own label Big Vin Records, posthumously after Darrell's murder in December 2004.

== Background ==
At the close of the decade, Coe met Pantera guitarist Dimebag Darrell in Fort Worth, Texas. The two musicians, struck by the similarity of the approaches between country, hard rock, and heavy metal, agreed to work together. Darrell was the son of Jerry Abbott, a country songwriter and producer. Together with Darrell's brother Vinnie Paul and bassist Rex Brown, they began production of the album which was recorded sporadically between 1999 and 2003. It was released in 2006, two years after Darrell's murder.

Originally, the song "Rebel Meets Rebel" was supposed to be released as a duet with Coe and Pantera's vocalist Phil Anselmo.

Paul took the album to release Rebel Meets Rebel on Atlantic Records, which previously fronted Pantera and Damageplan projects. However, Atlantic refused to release it on their label because they didn't know what to do with it. As a result, Paul fronted an independent label "Big Vin Records", which he inked a distribution deal with Fontana to release it under his name.

== Music and lyrics ==
The album's lyrical content ranges from boisterous songs regarding drinking and getting stoned to more serious subject matter, such as the song "Cherokee Cry", which criticizes the United States government's treatment of Native Americans.

Rebel Meets Rebel features what has been described as a "groundbreaking" mix of country music, hard rock, and heavy metal. AllMusic writer Megan Frye wrote, "On first listen, ["Nothin' to Lose"] sounds awkward—as if someone had spliced a Pantera song together with a David Allan Coe one on their home computer. It doesn't mesh well, and the bass seems too sharp and tinny. But after listening to the album a few times, it starts to make more sense." Dimebag Darrell was praised for his guitar playing, which incorporated elements from thrash metal, as well as dark melodic playing. "Rebel Meets Rebel" features fiddle playing by Joey Floyd.

== Track listing ==
All lyrics are written by David Allan Coe; all music is composed by Dimebag Darrell & Vinnie Paul.

No.	Title	Length
1.	"Nothin' to Lose"	3:40
2.	"Rebel Meets Rebel"	3:10
3.	"Cowboys Do More Dope"	4:48
4.	"Panfilo"	0:34
5.	"Heart Worn Highway"	4:12
6.	"One Nite Stands"	2:28
7.	"Arizona Rivers"	2:28
8.	"Get Outta My Life" (feat. Hank Williams III)	3:33
9.	"Cherokee Cry"	3:50
10.	"Time"	3:35
11.	"No Compromise"	3:52
12.	"N.Y.C. Streets"	4:12
Total length:		40:23

== Personnel ==
- David Allan Coe – lead vocals, rhythm guitar
- Dimebag Darrell – lead guitar, lead & backing vocals
- Rex Brown – bass guitar
- Vinnie Paul – drums
- Joey Floyd – fiddle on "Rebel Meets Rebel"
- Hank Williams III – vocals on "Get Outta My Life"
- Rex Mauney – keyboards

== Charts ==
Chart (2006)	Peak position
US Billboard 200	38
US Top Independent Albums	2
