= Smoke on This... =

Studio album by Rex Brown
- Released: July 28, 2017
- Genre: Hard rock; Southern rock
- Length: 39:37
- Label: Entertainment One
- Producer: Caleb Sherman

Smoke on This... is the debut solo studio album by American musician Rex Brown, released on July 28, 2017 via the label Entertainment One. For the first time in Brown's career, the work features him not only as a bassist but also as lead vocalist and guitarist.

== Track listing ==
| No. | Title | Length |
|---|---|---|
| 1. | "Lone Rider" | 2:39 |
| 2. | "Crossing Lines" | 2:55 |
| 3. | "Buried Alive" | 4:48 |
| 4. | "Train Song" | 2:36 |
| 5. | "Get Yourself Alright" | 4:04 |
| 6. | "Fault Line" | 4:17 |
| 7. | "What Comes Around..." | 4:36 |
| 8. | "Grace" | 3:14 |
| 9. | "So Into You" | 4:01 |
| 10. | "Best of Me" | 5:34 |
| 11. | "One of These Days" | 4:39 |
| Total length: | | 43:22 |

== Personnel ==
- Rex Brown – lead vocals, bass, guitar
- Lance Harvill – lead guitar
- Joe Shadid – rhythm guitar
- Johnny Kelly – drums
