= Drum charts =

Type of musical notation for drummers

Drum charts are musical charts written for drummers. They are used to help guide the drummer through the music. Sometimes they are meant to be read literally and other times they are used as suggestions for what the drummer should play. Drum charts include their own musical vocabulary. The music written for drummers is not the same as, say, a pianist. Drummers use their own symbols and language in their charts. For example, a "middle C" note written on a staff for pianists is equivalent to the "snare drum" for drummers. Or, the note "F" on the piano staff is equal to the "bass drum." There is no set standard for writing drum music. But there is a guide that is usually adhered to. For example, in Steve Houghton's book Studio & Big Band Drumming, p. 9, under "Rock Patterns", Steve writes each drum or cymbal used in a percussion staff and states the assigned "note." The placement of the drum notes is very typical of a drum chart but may not always be the same within the drum community.

== Sources ==
- Houghton, Steve. Studio & Big Band Drumming. Iowa: C.L. Barnhouse Company, 1985

== Links ==
Free drum charts collection
