= Becoming (song) =

Promotional single by Pantera

from the album Far Beyond Driven
- B-side: "5 Minutes Alone"
- Released: 1994
- Recorded: 1993
- Genre: Groove metal
- Length: 3:05
- Label: East West
- Songwriters: Dimebag Darrell; Vinnie Paul; Phil Anselmo; Rex Brown
- Producers: Terry Date; Vinnie Paul

Pantera singles chronology
"5 Minutes Alone" (1994)	"Becoming" (1994)	"Drag the Waters" (1996)

"Becoming" is a song by American heavy metal band Pantera from their seventh album Far Beyond Driven. It was released as a 2-track promotional-only vinyl 12", with "5 Minutes Alone" as its B-side.

== Overview ==
The song was conceived as an extensive series of high-speed double bass drum exercises by Vinnie Paul, and then guitarist Dimebag Darrell added riffs and a solo based on his first whammy pedal, the DigiTech Whammy. It also uses an unusual guitar tuning, as it sits between C# and D-tuning.

Vocalist and lyricist Phil Anselmo described the song as "gloating ... puffing the chest out ... very tongue in cheek, very much me playing around with words, and throwing a bit of a curveball at the listener". He elaborated, "The most popular heavy metal bands in the world at that time were, in my estimate and definitely all of our estimates, playing the game. ... They had reached this pinnacle; now they were kind of tapering off and writing more commercial stuff, whereas we realized our strong point, once again, was sticking to heavy metal and making it as heavy as our style would allow. Therefore, with 'Becoming', it is what it says. We were becoming. Honestly, we had arrived."

== Track listing ==
12" single

1. "Becoming"
2. "5 Minutes Alone"

== Reception ==
Rolling Stone called the "badass" song one of Pantera's most powerful and bluesy, a "rhythmic steam roller", with "next-level guitar pyrotechnics".
