= Vulgar Display of Power =

1992 studio album by Pantera

Studio album by Pantera
- Released: February 24, 1992
- Recorded: 1991
- Studio: Pantego Sound (Pantego, Texas)
- Genre: Groove metal
- Length: 52:48
- Label: Atco
- Producers: Terry Date; Vinnie Paul

Pantera chronology
Cowboys from Hell (1990)	Vulgar Display of Power (1992)	Walk (1993)

Pantera studio album chronology
Cowboys from Hell (1990)	Vulgar Display of Power (1992)	Far Beyond Driven (1994)

Singles from Vulgar Display of Power
- 1. "Mouth for War" Released: September 21, 1992; 2. "Walk" Released: February 15, 1993

Vulgar Display of Power is the sixth studio album by American groove metal band Pantera. Released on February 24, 1992, through Atco Records, it was the band's second collaboration with producer Terry Date, after having worked with him on their breakthrough album Cowboys from Hell (1990). The band sought to make an album heavier than Cowboys from Hell, particularly motivated by the more commercial sound Metallica had adopted on their self-titled album, which was released during the album's recording.

The album was well received by both critics and fans, and is Pantera's highest selling album to date, eventually being certified 2× Platinum while peaking within the top 50 of the Billboard 200, far above their previous album. It is often considered one of the greatest and most influential heavy metal albums of the 1990s, with both the album and its songs appearing in best-of lists for the decade and the genre. Several of its tracks have become among the band's best known, such as "Mouth for War", "A New Level", "Walk", "Fucking Hostile", and "This Love". Vulgar Display of Power received an expanded reissue in 2012, including an unreleased track, "Piss".

== Background and recording ==
Pantera's 1990 major label debut, Cowboys from Hell, demonstrated a change in the band's musical direction, from their 1980s material influenced by hard rock and glam metal bands like Van Halen and Kiss to resembling bands like Slayer, Metallica, and Black Sabbath.

In 1991, Pantera returned to Pantego Sound Studio to record Vulgar Display of Power, their second release under Atco. The album was produced by Terry Date, who specializes in the rock and metal genres and had worked with the band on Cowboys from Hell. Date also went on to produce the band's following two albums, Far Beyond Driven (1994) and The Great Southern Trendkill (1996). Before Date came in to work on the album, the band had demoed three tracks, "A New Level", "Regular People (Conceit)" and "No Good (Attack the Radical)". The rest of the songs were written in the studio with little preproduction or demoing.

After being in the studio for two months, Pantera were invited to open for Metallica and AC/DC at the 1991 Monsters of Rock free concert in Moscow's Tushino airfield on September 28, 1991. The band then returned to the studio to continue work on the album. They traveled to New York City to have it mastered at Masterdisk. Although guitarist Darrell Abbott was credited on the album with nickname "Diamond Darrell", during the recording of the album he had dropped that nickname and assumed "Dimebag Darrell" instead, and bassist Rex Brown dropped the pseudonym "Rexx Rocker".

== Musical style and lyrics ==
Drummer Vinnie Paul said that Cowboys from Hell was really close to the "definitive Pantera sound". When Metallica released their self titled album in 1991, Pantera considered it a letdown to fans because they believed Metallica abandoned the thrash metal sound heard on previous albums. In turn, Pantera felt they had an opportunity to fill a gap; they set out to make the heaviest record of all time.

Darrell had played the riff for "Walk" during a soundcheck while Pantera was touring for Cowboys from Hell and the rest of the band loved it. Following this tour, the band returned home and found that some friends thought that rock stardom had gone to their heads. The lyrics for the song were inspired by these people's attitude toward the band; Phil Anselmo's message to them was, "Take your fucking attitude and take a fuckin' walk with that. Keep that shit away from me."

== Title and artwork ==
The title of the album is taken from a line in the 1973 film The Exorcist. (Priest: "If you're the Devil, why not make the straps disappear?" Girl: "That's much too vulgar a display of power, Karras.") In April 2007, the title was used for the book A Vulgar Display of Power: Courage and Carnage at the Alrosa Villa, which includes many Pantera song titles as chapter headings. The book details the incidents leading up to the murder of Dimebag Darrell in 2004.

The album's cover depicts a man being punched in the face and was shot by photographer Brad Guice, who also shot the cover photo for Cowboys from Hell; Dimebag Darrell originally came up with the idea while playing around with a photocopier, and moving a photo around on the bed of the photocopier as the lamp was moving to get a distorted, smeared look of the face on the photo. The band told their label that they wanted "something vulgar, like a dude getting punched". The first version of the cover that the label brought to the band showed a boxer with a boxing glove, but the band did not like it, so the label produced a second version, with the bare fist. A popular rumor stirred up by Vinnie Paul was that the man on the cover was paid $10 a punch and was hit in the face a total of 31 (Rex Brown claiming 32) times to get the right picture. However, Guice dispelled this when he confirmed that the man, a hired model named Sean Cross, was never actually hit.

== Release ==
Vulgar Display of Power was first released on February 24, 1992 in the UK and one day thereafter worldwide in retail. The original album spawned two singles, "Mouth for War" and "Walk", along with a number of EPs featuring remixes of the song, alongside three additional promo singles, "This Love", "Hollow" and "Fucking Hostile". To further promote the album, the Walk EP was released in a handful of European countries, Australia, and Japan. On May 15, 2012, the EP was released digitally worldwide to coincide with the 20th anniversary reissue.

The band also released music videos for "Mouth for War", "This Love" and "Walk", which were included on Vulgar Video and 3 Vulgar Videos from Hell. The music video for "Walk" was shot at the Riviera Theatre in Chicago, where the band played the song multiple times to capture live video footage in front of fans.

=== Commercial performance ===
Vulgar Display of Power debuted at number 44 on the Billboard 200. It was the longest-charting album in the band's discography, charting for 78 consecutive weeks at that time. On February 9, 1993, the album was certified gold by the Recording Industry Association of America (RIAA), then platinum on November 7, 1997. It then reached double platinum sales on July 7, 2004, denoting 2,000,000 units sold. It has sold 1,770,521 copies in the US in 2002. In the beginning of June 2012, the reissue re-entered the Billboard 200 chart at number 88, selling over 9,000 copies, which it has brought to over 2,177,000 copies sold in the US. It also charted for two weeks, bringing its total to 80 weeks. According to Luminate (formerly SoundScan), it has sold 2,350,000 copies domestically as of the end of 2024.

Internationally, the album initially charted in four countries, including number 64 in the UK, number 69 in Germany, and number 56 in Australia. It charted in two additional countries in later years, peaking at number 54 in Japan and number 196 in Belgium. It was certified platinum in Australia by the Australian Recording Industry Association (ARIA) and Japan by the Recording Industry Association of Japan (RIAJ). The album received gold certifications in Canada, Argentina, New Zealand, and the United Kingdom.

"Mouth for War", became the band's first song to ever chart, debuted on 10 October 1992 on the UK Singles Chart and managed to peak at number 73. The album's second single, "Walk", marked their first top 40 UK hit when it debuted at number 35 for a period of two weeks in the chart.

== Tour and media appearances ==
To promote the album, Pantera toured with Skid Row and Soundgarden giving them the opportunity to perform in front of a mainstream audience in the United States. After touring with Skid Row, the band did a European tour with Megadeth. The band also toured with White Zombie in 1992. The unique sound and the band's explosive live performances helped them gain more popularity.

The music videos for singles from the album were played in relatively heavy rotation on MTV. Also during the 1990s, MTV's Headbangers Ball used excerpts from the album's songs for the show's opening theme, bumpers, and closing theme. "Walk" and "Mouth for War" were available as downloadable tracks for the video game Rock Band 3. "Walk" was also featured on Madden NFL 10, CSI: NY and Monday Night Football.

"By Demons Be Driven" appears in the 2015 Academy Award-nominated film The Big Short; actor Christian Bale is seen performing along to the song on drums, which he learned for that one scene.

== Critical reception ==
Professional ratings
Review scores
Source	Rating
AllMusic	4.5/5 stars
The Austin Chronicle	4/5 stars
Brave Words & Bloody Knuckles	9.5/10
Collector's Guide to Heavy Metal	10/10
Entertainment Weekly	A
Kerrang!	4/5 stars
The Phoenix	3.5/4 stars
Q	4/5 stars
Record Collector	4/5 stars
The Rolling Stone Album Guide	4/5 stars

Vulgar Display of Power received critical acclaim upon release. Many critics have praised Darrell's guitar work on the album and use of heavy riffs to set the tone for the album. Reviewers also pointed out the change in Anselmo's vocals from previous releases, with him using deeper growls and powerful vocals to accompany the catchy riffs and aggressive lyrics.

Kerrang! and Sputnikmusic both gave the album a 4 out of 5. Steve Huey of AllMusic rated the album 4.5 out of 5 stars, describing it as "One of the most influential heavy metal albums of the 1990s". He also said that while the album stacks the best songs at the beginning, the riffs and sonic textures are more consistently interesting than those used in Cowboys from Hell. Janiss Garza writing for Entertainment Weekly said that it was "one of the most satisfying heavy metal records since Metallica's early-80s cult days". She also praised the album's two ballad tracks, "This Love" and "Hollow", stating "their tough edge slashes painfully through deep introspection about personal relationships".

Reviewing the 20th anniversary reissue, Michael Christopher of The Phoenix rated the album 3.5 out of 4 stars, stating that, while the bonus track "Piss" does not match up to the rest of the material, the groove that flows through the original record is the muscle behind what mattered most. Denise Falzon of Exclaim! stated that the reissue sounds a little cleaner from the enhanced production quality. She noted that "Piss" does sound oddly out of place on the reissue, but the release is worthwhile for the DVD showcasing the band's dynamic live performance.

== Legacy and accolades ==
Vulgar Display of Power has been listed as one of the 1001 Albums You Must Hear Before You Die. Chad Bowar of About.com ranked the album at number one in his list of the "Best Heavy Metal Albums of 1992", stating that "Pantera was head and shoulders above the rest of the field." He also ranked the album second in the "Best Heavy Metal Albums of the 1990s" list behind Megadeth's Rust in Peace (1990). In October 2011, the album was ranked number four on Guitar World magazine's list of "The Top 10 Guitar Albums of 1992". The album was ranked number one on Loudwire's "Top 11 Metal Albums of the 1990s" and their "Top 10 Albums of 1992", and the song "Walk" was ranked number seven in their "10 Catchiest Metal Songs". Loudwire also listed four of the album's songs in their list of the "10 Best Pantera songs", placing "This Love" in seventh, "Mouth for War" in fifth, "Fucking Hostile" in third and "Walk" in first. In 2017, Rolling Stone ranked Vulgar Display of Power as 10th on their list of "The 100 Greatest Metal Albums of All Time". In 2022, Guitar World ranked Vulgar Display of Power number one on their list of "The 30 greatest rock guitar albums of 1992". In 2005, Vulgar Display of Power was ranked number 333 in Rock Hard magazine's book The 500 Greatest Rock & Metal Albums of All Time. IGN named Vulgar Display of Power the eleventh most influential heavy metal album ever on their list of the "Top 25 Metal Albums". They wrote the following:

This album makes the list because it took heavy metal and made it heavier. It took darkness and made it darker. It took anger and made it angrier. Never before had a band tuned down its guitars and crunched a heavier riff than on this album. 'Mouth for War' and 'A New Level' and 'No Good (Attack the Radical)' stand out on an album where every track is a classic track. Dimebag Darrell was an innovator and a true godsend for heavy metal. One of the most underrated players in the genre. And this may sound corny, but the way the band was able to turn seemingly negative aspects of the genre – hate, anger, violence and despair – into positive thoughts is somewhat akin to De La Soul dropping a positive message into rap.

The song "Walk" has been covered by a number of bands and artists, including Avenged Sevenfold, Leo Moracchioli, Disturbed, and Breaking Benjamin, among others.

=== 20th anniversary reissue ===
On May 15, 2012, a two-disc deluxe edition of Vulgar Display of Power was released to celebrate its 20th anniversary. Disc one is a remastered version of the original album along with the song "Piss". Disc two is a DVD featuring six songs from Pantera's set at their 1992 Monsters of Rock performance in Reggio Emilia, Italy. Disc two also contains the three music videos for "Mouth for War", "Walk" and "This Love". The song "Piss" had been rediscovered by Drummer Vinnie Paul while looking through old Pantera recordings. He said that at the time of the original release, the band thought that it didn't feel right to go on the record, and claimed it was "the only undiscovered complete Pantera track there ever was" The music video for "Piss" debuted at the Revolver Golden Gods Awards, on April 11, 2012. The main riff from "Piss" was used in the song "Use My Third Arm" on the band's following record Far Beyond Driven.

== Track listing ==
All tracks are written by Pantera (Philip Anselmo, Diamond Darrell, Rex, Vinnie Paul).

No.	Title	Length
1.	"Mouth for War"	3:57
2.	"A New Level"	3:57
3.	"Walk"	5:14
4.	"Fucking Hostile"	2:48
5.	"This Love"	6:32
6.	"Rise"	4:36
7.	"No Good (Attack the Radical)"	4:49
8.	"Live in a Hole"	5:00
9.	"Regular People (Conceit)"	5:27
10.	"By Demons Be Driven"	4:40
11.	"Hollow"	5:48
Total length:		52:48

20th anniversary edition bonus track
No.	Title	Length
12.	"Piss"	5:07
Total length:		57:55

20th anniversary edition bonus DVD
No.	Title	Length
1.	"Mouth for War" (Live in Italy)
2.	"Domination/Hollow" (Live in Italy)
3.	"Rise" (Live in Italy)
4.	"This Love" (Live in Italy)
5.	"Cowboys from Hell" (Live in Italy)
6.	"Mouth for War" (video)
7.	"This Love" (video)
8.	"Walk" (video)

== Personnel ==
Pantera

- Philip Anselmo – vocals
- Diamond Darrell – guitars
- Rex – bass guitar
- Vinnie Paul – drums

Technical

- Terry Date – engineering, mixing, production
- Vinnie Paul – engineering, mixing, production
- Pantera – co-production
- Howie Weinberg – mastering
- Doug Sax – vinyl mastering
- Brad Guice – photography
- Joe Giron – photography
- Bob Defrin – artwork
- Larry Freemantle – design

== Charts ==
1992–1994 weekly chart performance for Vulgar Display of Power
Chart (1992–1994)	Peak position
Australian Albums (ARIA)	56
German Albums (Offizielle Top 100)	69
UK Albums (Official Charts)	64
US Billboard 200	44

1996–1999 weekly chart performance for Vulgar Display of Power
Chart (1996–1999)	Peak position
Japanese Albums (Oricon)	54
UK Rock & Metal Albums (Official Charts)	26

2012 weekly chart performance for Vulgar Display of Power
Chart (2012)	Peak position
Belgian Albums (Ultratop Wallonia)	196
UK Rock & Metal Albums (Official Charts)	17
US Billboard 200	88
US Vinyl Albums (Billboard)	4
US Catalog Albums (Billboard)	7
US Indie Store (Billboard)	21

== Certifications ==
Certifications for Vulgar Display of Power
Region	Certification	Certified units/sales
Argentina (CAPIF)	Gold	30,000^{^}
Australia (ARIA)	Platinum	70,000^{^}
Canada (Music Canada)	Gold	50,000^{^}
Denmark (IFPI Danmark)	Platinum	20,000^{‡}
Ireland (IRMA)	Silver	5,000
Japan (RIAJ)	Platinum	200,000^{^}
New Zealand (RMNZ)	Gold	7,500^{‡}
United Kingdom (BPI)	Gold	100,000^{^}
United States (RIAA)	2× Platinum	2,350,000
^{^} Shipments figures based on certification alone.^{‡} Sales+streaming figures based on certification alone.

== Release history ==
Release dates and formats for "Vulgar Display of Power"
Region	Date	Format(s)	Edition(s)	Label	Ref.
United Kingdom	February 24, 1992	CD; LP; cassette	Standard	Atco/Atlantic	
North America	February 25, 1992	CD; LP; cassette	Standard	Atco/Atlantic	
Japan	March 25, 1992	CD	Standard	EastWest; Atco	
Various	December 16, 2008	Digital download; streaming	Standard	Atco; Rhino	
Various	May 15, 2012	CD; DVD; digital download; streaming	20th Anniversary	Atco; Rhino	
Japan	August 11, 2012	CD; DVD; digital download; streaming	20th Anniversary	Atco; Rhino	
