= Cemetery Gates (Pantera song) =

Promotional single by Pantera

from the album Cowboys from Hell
- Released: July 24, 1990 (album); 1990 (single)
- Recorded: 1989–1990
- Genre: Heavy metal
- Length: 7:02
- Label: Atco
- Songwriters: Dimebag Darrell; Vinnie Paul; Phil Anselmo; Rex Brown
- Producer: Terry Date

"Cemetery Gates" is a power ballad by American heavy metal band Pantera. The song is the fifth track from the 1990 album Cowboys from Hell, the band's fifth record and second with lead singer Phil Anselmo. The song, the longest in Pantera's discography, showcases Anselmo's vocal ability and range, concluding with screaming high notes answered by Dimebag Darrell on guitar in a trade-off.

== Lyrics ==
The lyrics lament the death of a female lover and the prospect of dying or dying by suicide and rejoining her in the afterlife.

Phil Anselmo has credited numerous inspirations for the song. The title comes from the similarly titled "Cemetry Gates" by The Smiths, of whom Anselmo is a big fan. He stated in a 1991 interview that the song was written about his good friends that had committed suicide. He also stated in a Ustream.tv live Q&A that "there was a friend who had died in NOLA and it had a real heavy impact within my group of friends. When I wrote the lyrics I did not want them to be too personal, because that can be cheesy. I also had to make sure that the lyrics would not take away from the song, because that was one of our best songs."

== Release and reception ==
"Cemetery Gates" was the second single released by the band off their Cowboys from Hell album. It received a large amount of airplay by rock stations and has become one of Pantera's most popular songs. Guitar World magazine readers voted the song's solo the 35th-greatest of all time, which was Dimebag's second-highest ranking solo (after "Floods"). A live version of the song from Official Live: 101 Proof was nominated for Best Metal Performance at the 40th Grammy Awards in 1998.

Metal Hammer considered "Cemetery Gates" to be the best Pantera song, writing that it is one of the greatest epic ballads in metal history, and that it is "etched into the hearts and minds of metalheads everywhere".

== Alternative versions ==
A shorter version of "Cemetery Gates" without its acoustic beginning was released into a music video. A shortened, 5:47-second version without the conclusion was included on the soundtrack of the 1995 film Tales from the Crypt Presents Demon Knight. Pantera's live album, Official Live: 101 Proof, includes a six-and-a-half-minute rendition of the song.

== Personnel ==
- Phil Anselmo – vocals
- Dimebag Darrell – guitars, additional bass
- Rex – bass, acoustic guitar, piano, additional rhythm guitar
- Vinnie Paul – drums

== Charts ==
Chart performance for "Cemetery Gates"
| Chart (1995) | Peak position |
|---|---|
| Australia (ARIA) | 99 |
| US Rock Tracks Top 60 (Radio & Records) | 48 |

== Certifications ==
| Region | Certification | Certified units/sales |
|---|---|---|
| New Zealand (RMNZ) | Platinum | 30,000^{‡} |
^{‡} Sales+streaming figures based on certification alone.
