= Cowboys from Hell =

Studio album by Pantera
- Released: July 24, 1990
- Recorded: Late 1989 – April 1990
- Studio: Pantego Sound (Pantego, Texas)
- Genres: Groove metal; thrash metal
- Length: 57:43
- Label: Atco
- Producer: Terry Date

Pantera chronology
Power Metal (1988)	Cowboys from Hell (1990)	Vulgar Display of Power (1992)

Singles from Cowboys from Hell
- 1. "Cowboys from Hell" Released: 1990; 2. "Psycho Holiday" Released: 1990

Cowboys from Hell is the fifth studio album and major label debut by American heavy metal band Pantera, released on July 24, 1990, by Atco Records. It marked the first of many collaborations with producer Terry Date. Cowboys from Hell was also the album where Pantera fully abandoned the glam metal style of their previous albums in favor of a heavier sound. It has been recognized as one of the first ever groove metal albums.

Recorded from late 1989 to April 1990, the album was the band's major label debut after four albums released on independent labels. The album's style was heavily influenced by thrash metal, in particular Overkill and their album The Years of Decay.

Upon its release, the album sold slowly and did not chart until 1992, but has since gone on to be certified double Platinum in the United States. It has received widespread acclaim since its initial release, and is today regarded as one of the most influential metal albums of the 1990s.

== Background ==
Pantera formed in 1981, switching between the names Gemini, Eternity, and finally Pantera. During their early years, the band failed to find much success, despite being popular in the underground in Texas, Oklahoma and Louisiana. The band would release three albums with vocalist Terry Glaze before eventually recruiting Phil Anselmo for their fourth album, Power Metal.

The band began to write what would become their fifth album, Cowboys from Hell, in 1988 and 1989. Seeking a record label to release their album, the group received firm contract offers from both Epic and Roadracer, who had expressed some interest in signing them. However, they were ultimately recommended to music producers with a "more commercial type" of approach, as explained by drummer Vinnie Paul. After being turned down "28 times by every major label on the face of the Earth", Atco Records representative Mark Ross was asked by his boss, Derek Shulman (who was interested in signing Pantera), to see the band perform after Hurricane Hugo stranded him in Texas. Ross was so impressed by the band's performance that he called his boss that night, suggesting that Pantera be signed to the label. Ross would later say this about the performance:

"By the end of the first song, my jaw was on the floor. The sonic power of it all — the attitude and the musicianship — blew me away. Basically, you had to be an idiot to not think they're amazing. I mean, how could you see these guys and not think, 'Holy shit!'?"

Atco Records accepted but the band had to wait a six month period before they commenced recording at Pantego Sound Studio in Pantego, Texas.

== Writing and recording ==
Accounts vary as to how long the recording sessions of Cowboys from Hell lasted. Bassist Rex Brown stated in a 2010 interview with Metal Hammer that the recording sessions took place from February to April 1990; however, vocalist Phil Anselmo has also claimed that the album was recorded in 1989. Pantera's initial choice as the producer for Cowboys from Hell was Max Norman based on his work with Ozzy Osbourne. Norman, who flew to Houston to watch the band perform, initially agreed to work on the album, but right before the recording sessions started, he was offered to produce Lynch Mob's debut album Wicked Sensation instead. Pantera then proposed Terry Date to produce the album on the strength of his work with Soundgarden, Metal Church and Overkill, the latter of whose latest album at the time The Years of Decay had influenced Dimebag Darrell's guitar tone, as well as the band's transition away from glam/traditional heavy metal to thrash/groove metal.

According to Love It Loud, Pantera "adopted a new sound and attitude, the writing of what would become Cowboys from Hell saw the band exploring darker subject matters, whilst the guitar would be notably heavier." RockList.com has noted that, "The riffs owe a debt to thrash, Overkill's The Years of Decay above all, but they lurch and swing with a groove all their own, Dimebag's guitar squealing and Anselmo's roar going for the throat." Influences and inspirations to the making of the album, as well as its musical direction, included Black Sabbath, Judas Priest, ZZ Top, Metallica, Slayer, Megadeth, Anthrax, Testament, Overkill, Faith No More, King's X, Soundgarden, Minor Threat, Mercyful Fate, Savatage, and Voivod. The band recorded a self-produced demo album in 1989 with eleven tracks, ten of which made the album cut ("The Will to Survive" was excluded early in the recording sessions), while the last tracks to be written were "Primal Concrete Sledge" and "Clash with Reality".

During the recording sessions, the band chose an unorthodox method: Paul recorded the drum tracks first, then Darrell recorded the guitar, and Brown recorded the bass with the guitars only. This resulted in a tighter sound; slight inaccuracies were fixed by manually editing the tapes.

Love It Loud noted that "the band were feeling confident about their material and themselves, finally feeling that they were making the kind of album they believed in. One key track to emerge during the writing was "Cemetery Gates", a seven-minute power ballad that would be the first song to show both their diversity and Anselmo's vocal range"; the acoustic intro was written last by Brown. Love It Loud also stated that "although they had already recorded four albums prior to Cowboys from Hell, the members of Pantera have since acknowledged this as their official debut album, working with a professional producer and a major label for the first time and creating music that was not simply stealing from other similar bands in an attempt to attract attention."

== Artwork ==
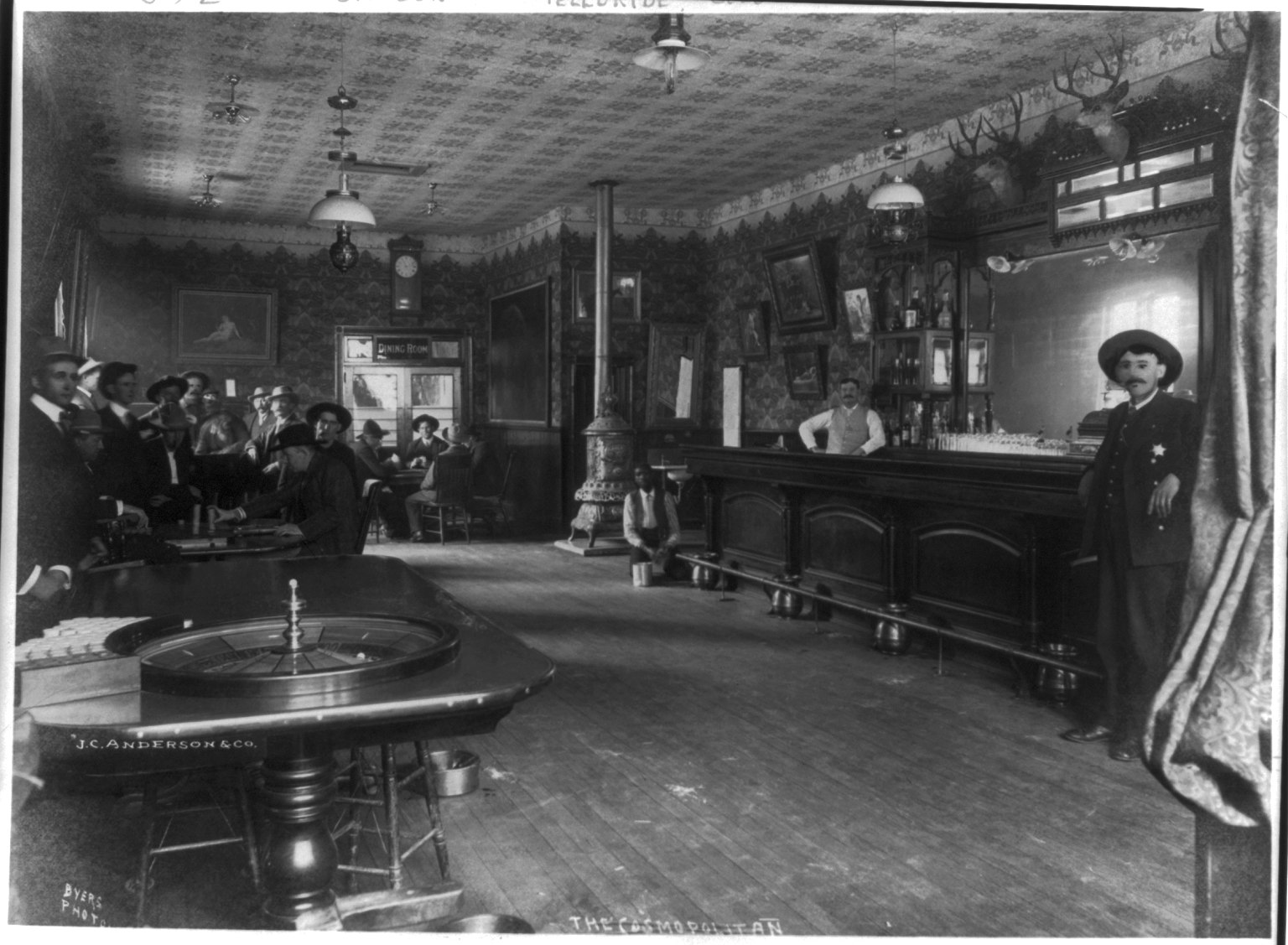
The original, unaltered photo used in the Cowboys from Hell album cover

The cover art depicts the band in a quaint Western saloon. In reality, it is a 1910 photo of the "Cosmopolitan Saloon" in Telluride, Colorado, with the bandmembers pasted over it. Dimebag Darrell is pictured in the center playing guitar, while Vinnie Paul is standing to his right counting money, Rex Brown is leaning against the counter top and Phil Anselmo is shown jumping in the air to Brown's left. Anselmo states that he jumped off a bar stool to get high up in the air and that it took him about ten takes until the cameramen got the shot of the desired style.

== Touring ==
Pantera toured for nearly two years in support of Cowboys from Hell. The band embarked on their first national tour in the summer of 1990, supporting Exodus and Suicidal Tendencies. In 1991, Rob Halford performed with the band onstage, which led Pantera (along with Annihilator) to open for Judas Priest on its first show in Europe. They also opened for bands like Skid Row, Sepultura, Fates Warning, Prong, Mind Over Four, Morbid Angel, White Zombie and Sanctuary, and co-headlined a North American tour with Wrathchild America. The band eventually landed a billing for the Monsters of Rock festival with AC/DC, Mötley Crüe, Metallica and The Black Crowes in September 1991, where they played to a crowd of over 500,000 in celebration of the new freedom of performing Western music in the former Soviet Union shortly before its collapse three months later.

== Release ==
The album was released on July 24, 1990, and was available on tape, CD, vinyl and a limited-edition version (same album but in a long box).

=== Commercial performance ===
Despite being the band's commercial breakthrough, Cowboys from Hell sold slowly and steadily for most of the 1990s, first charting on Billboard in 1992, two years after its release. It was certified Gold in the United States in September 1993, and Platinum in July 1997. Cowboys from Hell has since gone on to attain a double Platinum (2,000,000 units) certification in the U.S. as well as Gold status in the U.K. for sales of 100,000.

As far as specific charting, Cowboys from Hell peaked at number 27 on the Billboard Top Heatseekers chart in 1992; in March 1995, the album entered the Swedish Charts at number 46.

=== Reissue ===
On September 14, 2010, a 20th anniversary edition was released with a remastered mix from the original analog recordings. The expanded edition features a bonus CD of previously unreleased live recordings and the Alive and Hostile EP. The deluxe edition features an additional third CD with the previously unreleased demo track "The Will to Survive" (parts of the song were later used in the song "This Love" from Vulgar Display of Power) along with demo versions of ten songs from the original album.

The third disc of the deluxe set, Cowboys from Hell: The Demos, was released as a separate limited-edition vinyl LP at the same time. It was exclusively available at Metal Club record stores. The 2010 reissue of the album managed to reach number 117 on the Billboard 200 for the first time and number eight on Catalog Albums, selling 4,200.

== Critical reception and legacy ==
Professional ratings
Review scores
Source	Rating
About.com	4.5/5 stars
AllMusic	4/5 stars
BBC Music	(favorable)
Collector's Guide to Heavy Metal	9/10
Exclaim!	(favorable)
Record Collector	4/5 stars
The Rolling Stone Album Guide	3.5/5 stars

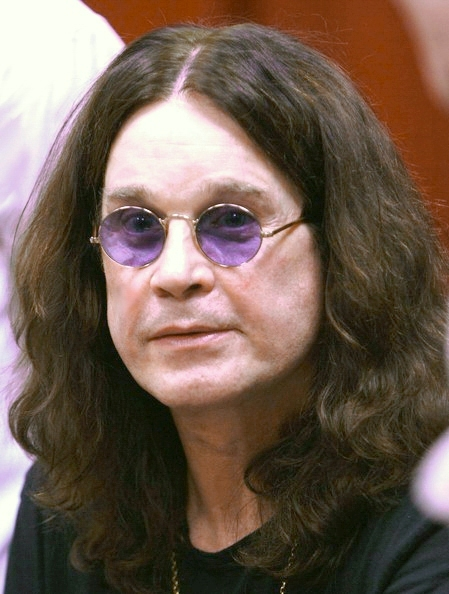
The album was praised by Ozzy Osbourne. In 2017, he listed Cowboys from Hell as one of his ten favorite metal albums.

Cowboys from Hell is widely considered one of Pantera's best albums, as well as one of the greatest metal albums of all time. It has been praised by most critics, as it would prove to be extremely influential in the development of groove metal in the 1990s. The album is also credited for reviving heavy metal music at a time when it was diminishing in relevance. Cowboys from Hell would inspire a generation of musicians, particularly guitarists. IGN named Cowboys from Hell the 19th-most-influential heavy metal album of all time.

They said of the album:

Along with Vulgar Display of Power, Pantera's fifth album is not only considered one of the band's best, but is also one of the defining albums of early '90s metal. The band's chemistry really begins to gel with collective symmetry here, as a pre-Dimebag Darrell (he was known as Diamond Darrell back then) rips the strings of his axe like a rabid weasel, frontman Phil Anselmo following in kind with chaotic vocal utterances, and the rhythm section of Vinnie Paul and Rex Brown keeping the rhythms in check and the whole mess glued together with low end prowess.

AllMusic said of the album:

Pantera's breakthrough album, Cowboys from Hell, is largely driven by the band's powerful rhythm section and guitarist Diamond Darrell's unbelievably forceful riffing, which skittered around the downbeats to produce unexpected rhythmic phrases and accents, as well as his inventive soloing.

The album was ranked number 11 on the October 2006 issue of Guitar World magazine's list of the greatest 100 guitar albums of all time. It was ranked the 85th-best heavy metal album of all time by Metal-Rules.com. IGN named Cowboys from Hell the 19th-most-influential heavy metal album of all time. It is also credited as "defining" groove metal. The album has also been praised by Ozzy Osbourne, who in 2017 listed it among his ten favorite metal albums.

== Track listing ==
All songs written and arranged by Pantera (Phil Anselmo, Diamond Darrell, Rex, Vinnie Paul).

No.	Title	Length
1.	"Cowboys from Hell"	4:06
2.	"Primal Concrete Sledge"	2:13
3.	"Psycho Holiday"	5:19
4.	"Heresy"	4:47
5.	"Cemetery Gates"	7:02
6.	"Domination"	5:04
7.	"Shattered"	3:22
8.	"Clash with Reality"	5:16
9.	"Medicine Man"	5:15
10.	"Message in Blood"	5:10
11.	"The Sleep"	5:47
12.	"The Art of Shredding"	4:18
Total length:		57:43

=== Disc 2: Expanded Edition bonus CD ===
Live: Foundations Forum (1990)
No.	Title	Length
1.	"Domination" (Live at Foundations Forum, 1990)	4:55
2.	"Psycho Holiday" (Live at Foundations Forum, 1990)	5:25
3.	"The Art of Shredding" (Live at Foundations Forum, 1990)	5:47
4.	"Cowboys from Hell" (Live at Foundations Forum, 1990)	5:01
5.	"Cemetery Gates" (Live at Foundations Forum, 1990)	7:05
6.	"Primal Concrete Sledge" (Live at Foundations Forum, 1990)	3:51
7.	"Heresy" (Live at Foundations Forum, 1990)	5:12

Alive and Hostile EP
No.	Title	Length
8.	"Domination" (Live at Monsters in Moscow, 1991)	7:05
9.	"Primal Concrete Sledge" (Live at Monsters in Moscow, 1991)	3:17
10.	"Cowboys from Hell" (Live at Monsters in Moscow, 1991)	4:16
11.	"Heresy" (Live at Monsters in Moscow, 1991)	4:59
12.	"Psycho Holiday" (Live at Monsters in Moscow, 1991)	5:50
Total length:		83:10

=== Disc 3: Cowboys from Hell: The Demos ===
Only available on the 'Deluxe' and 'Ultimate' editions of the album.

No.	Title	Length
1.	"The Will to Survive" (demo)	4:14
2.	"Shattered" (demo)	4:47
3.	"Cowboys from Hell" (demo)	4:06
4.	"Heresy" (demo)	4:42
5.	"Cemetery Gates" (demo)	5:19
6.	"Psycho Holiday" (demo)	5:09
7.	"Medicine Man" (demo)	4:52
8.	"Message in Blood" (demo)	4:57
9.	"Domination" (demo)	4:45
10.	"The Sleep" (demo)	6:15
11.	"The Art of Shredding" (demo)	4:11
Total length:		53:17

== Cowboys from Hell: The Demos ==
The demos were recorded in 1989 and re-released on Black Friday 2010. Copies were limited to 3,000 180-gram pressings, with the vinyl including the custom cover and demos of the original tracks, as well as the previously unreleased demo cut "The Will to Survive".

=== Track listing ===
No.	Title	Length
1.	"The Will to Survive" (demo)	4:14
2.	"Shattered" (demo)	4:47
3.	"Cowboys from Hell" (demo)	4:06
4.	"Heresy" (demo)	4:42
5.	"Cemetery Gates" (demo)	5:19
6.	"Psycho Holiday" (demo)	5:09
7.	"Medicine Man" (demo)	4:52
8.	"Message in Blood" (demo)	4:57
9.	"Domination" (demo)	4:45
10.	"The Sleep" (demo)	6:15
11.	"The Art of Shredding" (demo)	4:11
Total length:		53:17

Note

- Demos of the album's tracks were also released in 2010, in the 20th anniversary edition of Cowboys from Hell, but with a different track listing.

== Personnel ==
All personnel credits for Cowboys From Hell are adapted from the album's liner notes, except where noted.

Pantera

- Phil Anselmo – vocals
- Diamond Darrell – guitars; additional bass ("Cowboys from Hell", "Cemetery Gates"); production (demos)
- Rex – bass; acoustic guitar and piano ("Cemetery Gates"), additional rhythm guitar ("Cowboys from Hell", "Cemetery Gates")
- Vinnie Paul – drums; production, recording, mixing, engineering (demo tracks)

Technical

- Terry Date – production, engineering, mixing
- Pantera – co-production, mixing
- Matt Lane – assistant engineer
- Matt Gililland – assistant engineer
- Howie Weinberg – mastering
- Jerry Abbott – production, recording, mixing, engineering (demo tracks)

Creative

- Beb Derfin – art direction
- Joe Giron – live photos
- Bettman Archive – front cover background photo

== Charts ==
Chart (1992)	Peak position
US Heatseekers Albums (Billboard)	27

Chart (1995)	Peak position
Swedish Albums (Sverigetopplistan)	46
US Top Catalog Albums (Billboard)	8

Chart (2010)	Peak position
UK Rock & Metal Albums (Official Charts)	32
US Billboard 200	117

== Certifications ==
Region	Certification	Certified units/sales
Argentina (CAPIF)	Gold	30,000^{^}
Australia (ARIA)	Gold	35,000^{^}
Japan (RIAJ)	Gold	100,000
United Kingdom (BPI)	Gold	100,000^{^}
United States (RIAA)	2× Platinum	2,000,000^{‡}
^{^} Shipments figures based on certification alone.^{‡} Sales+streaming figures based on certification alone.
