= Rex Brown =

American bassist (born 1964)

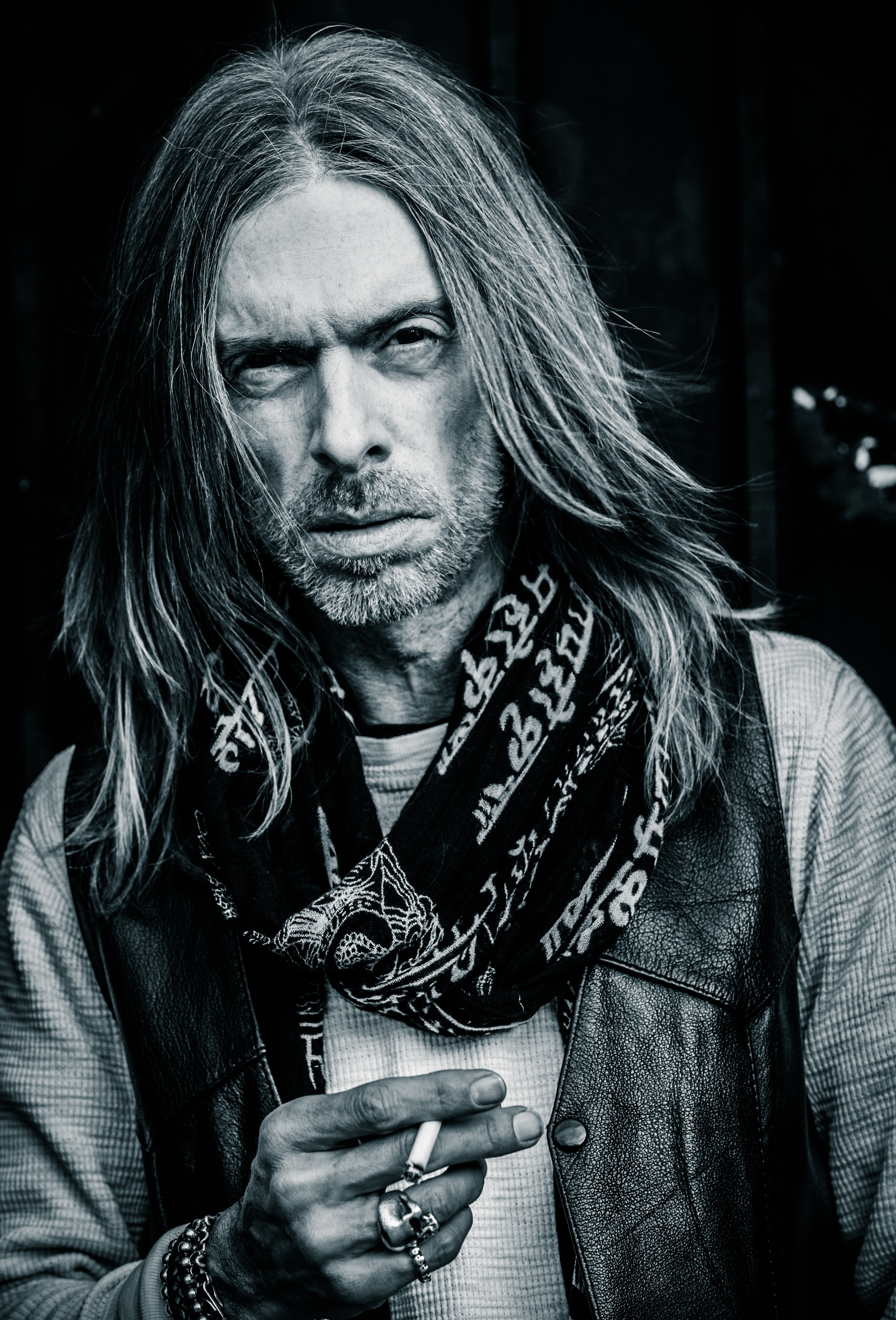
- Brown in 2017

Background information
- Also known as: "Rex Rocker" (pre-1990)
- Born: Rex Robert Brown; July 27, 1964 (age 62); Graham, Texas, U.S.
- Genres: Heavy metal; groove metal; thrash metal; sludge metal; glam metal (early work); hard rock; Southern rock; country rock; blues rock
- Occupation: Bassist
- Years active: 1981–present
- Member of: Pantera
- Formerly of: Down; Kill Devil Hill; Rebel Meets Rebel; Arms of the Sun; Crowbar
- Website: rexbrown.net

Rex Robert Brown (born July 27, 1964) is an American musician and the bassist for heavy metal band Pantera. He joined the band in 1982 and now is the band's longest-serving member, following the death of Abbott brothers (Dimebag Darrell and Vinnie Paul) and the band's reformation.

Brown is also a former member of the supergroup Down (2001–2011) and a former bassist for Kill Devil Hill. He released his debut solo album Smoke on This... in 2017. For the first time in Brown's career, the work features him not only as a bassist but also as lead vocalist and guitarist.

Brown authored a book called Official Truth 101 Proof, which was released in April 2013. The book documents Pantera's formation, career, and disbandment.

== Early life ==
Rex Robert Brown was born in Graham, Texas, on July 27, 1964. His father was 40 when Brown was born, and died in 1971. He was raised by his mother and sister. Brown was first introduced to music through his grandmother, who taught him to play the piano when he was a child, and turned him onto ragtime music and Scott Joplin. Brown was a member of the Boy Scouts of America and achieved the rank of Eagle Scout. Brown became a fan of ZZ Top and Def Leppard as a youth, and started playing bass when he was twelve years old. Other significant influences include Rush, Black Sabbath, Led Zeppelin, and hardcore punk.

== Career ==
=== Pantera ===
Pantera was formed in 1981. Brown joined Pantera on bass in 1982 replacing Tommy D. Bradford and adopting the alias "Rex Rocker". Brown was a classmate of, and played in the high school jazz band with, drummer Vinnie Paul, and guitarist Dimebag Darrell (then known as Diamond Darrell). Brown was credited as "Rex Rocker" on Pantera's first four albums: Metal Magic (1983), Projects in the Jungle (1984), I Am the Night (1985), and Power Metal (1988), he would be credited by his birth name starting with the band's fifth album, Cowboys from Hell, and onwards.

Pantera recruited vocalist Phil Anselmo to replace Terry Glaze in 1986. With Anselmo taking over as the new frontman, the band's fourth album, Power Metal, was released in 1988. In 1989, the band was signed with Atco Records, and released their fifth album, Cowboys from Hell, in the following year, which proved to be the band's turning point to commercial success. Over the course of the band's walkthrough in the 1990s decade, Pantera released four more studio albums, Vulgar Display of Power (1992), Far Beyond Driven (1994), The Great Southern Trendkill (1996), and Reinventing the Steel (2000). After releases of a 1997 live album and a greatest hits compilation, Pantera was nominated for four best metal performance Grammys, for "I'm Broken", "Suicide Note Pt. I", "Cemetery Gates", and "Revolution Is My Name".

In 2001, Pantera went on what at the time was believed to be a temporary hiatus, mainly due to Anselmo's focus on side projects. Pantera would officially disband in 2003.

In July 2022, it was announced that Brown would be joining Anselmo, along with Zakk Wylde and Charlie Benante (as the respective fill-ins of Dimebag Darrell and Vinnie Paul), for Pantera's first world tour in 22 years in 2023.

=== Down ===
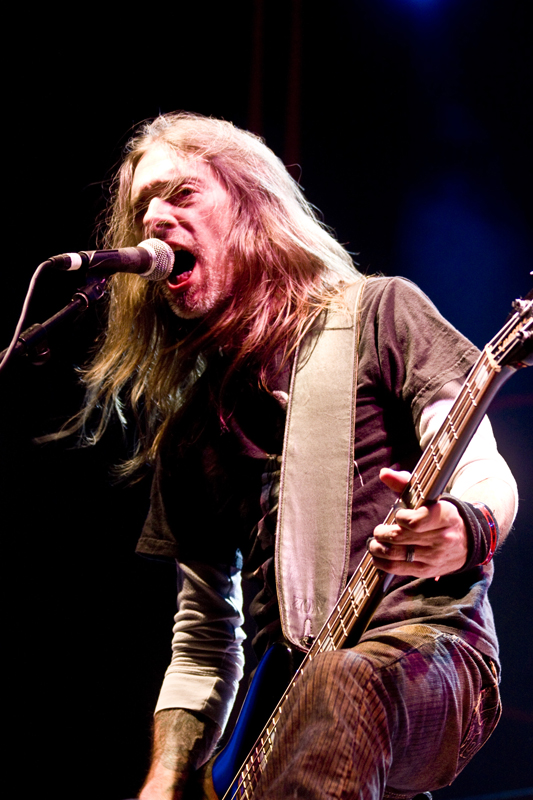
Brown performing with Down in 2010

In 1998, during his stay in Louisiana, he was invited by Phil Anselmo for a jam session that included all the members of Down except their bass player Todd Strange, who left the band. That night they ended up writing several demos for what later became their second album recorded in the fall of 2001 at Anselmo's barn that had been transformed into a professional studio. The album was released on March 26, 2002, and became the first Down release featuring Brown on bass. The band, however, went on hiatus again at the very end of 2002.

In 2006, the band reunited and started writing the material for their third studio album. Down III: Over the Under was released in 2007. The band toured as the opening act for Metallica. During that time, he became good friends with James Hetfield, who—similarly to Brown—completed an alcohol rehabilitation course back in 2002.

Wanting to explore different music, Brown left Down in 2011.

=== Other work ===
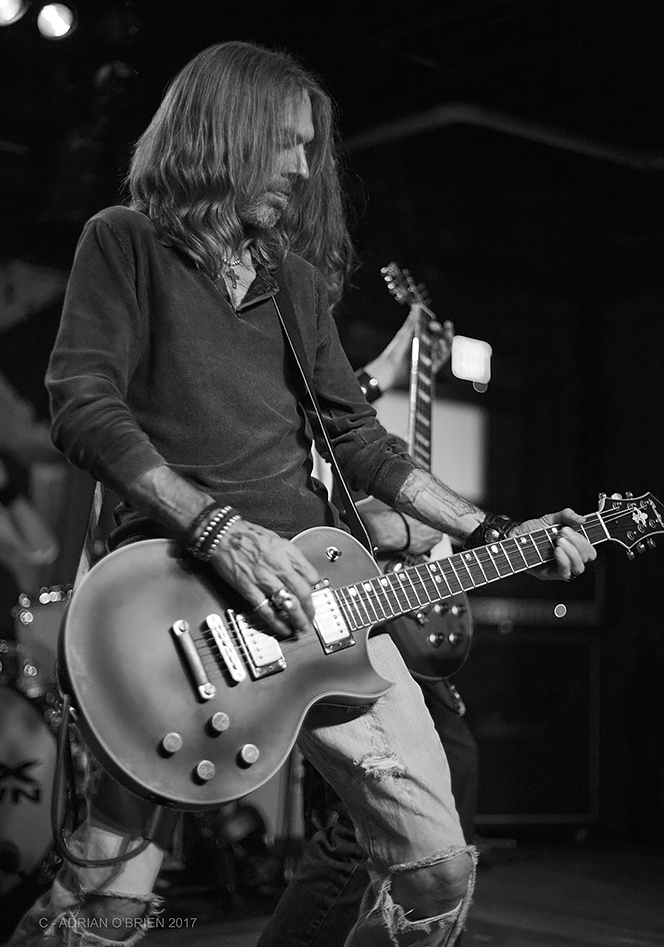
Brown performing in Nashville, Tennessee, 2017

In 1999, Brown, Dimebag Darrell, and Vinnie Paul teamed up with country artist David Allan Coe in a project called Rebel Meets Rebel. This group released an album on May 2, 2006, on Vinnie Paul's Big Vin Records label.

Brown has worked previously with Jerry Cantrell on five tracks included on the album called Boggy Depot as well as eleven tracks with Crowbar on the album Lifesblood for the Downtrodden. He has also provided bass work for Crowbar in 2004 and 2005 and to Cavalera Conspiracy in 2008. Rex revealed his new project Arms of the Sun, a project also featuring John Luke Hebert (of King Diamond) on drums, Lance Harvill on vocals and guitar, and Ben Bunker (of Gryn) on guitar. The group has completed work on thirteen tracks at Willie Nelson's Pedernales Recording Studio in Austin, produced and mixed by Terry Date. In February 2011 it was announced that Brown had amicably left Arms of the Sun. A replacement bassist has not yet been announced.

In March 2011, it was announced that Brown had formed a new band, Kill Devil Hill with Vinny Appice (Heaven & Hell, Black Sabbath, Dio) on drums, Mark Zavon (Ratt, W.A.S.P., 40 Cycle Hum) on guitar and Dewey Bragg (Pissing Razors) on vocals. The group has demoed around 10 songs, which, according to Appice, sound "like a cross between Black Sabbath, Alice in Chains and a little bit of Led Zeppelin thrown in. It's heavy, but with a lot of cool hooks and melodic overtones, too." Kill Devil Hill released their debut album in May 2012 to critical acclaim, and continue to tour in support of their music.

In 2013, Brown released an autobiography, titled Official Truth: 101 Proof, which chronicles his personal life and journey through Pantera, including the events leading to the band's disbandment.

In 2015, Brown penned the foreword to the book Survival of the Fittest: Heavy Metal in the 1990s, by author Greg Prato. Rex was also interviewed for the book (as well as his former bandmate in Pantera, Anselmo, among many others).

Brown's first solo album, Smoke on This…, was released on July 28, 2017, via Entertainment One.

In 2023, he played bass on the debut album of metal supergroup Elegant Weapons.

== Personal life ==
Brown does not "subscribe to any particular organized religion", though he says he believes in God and the Ten Commandments.

In August 2009, Brown was excluded from the Down tour due to acute pancreatitis. He then had his gallbladder and polyps on his pancreas removed. "Rex has been through hell, man", said bandmate Pepper Keenan. "He was cut from rib to rib and they cleaned him out, but he's in top shape again. After twenty-five years on the road – drinking every day and whatnot … well, the old days are over, my friend."

Brown married his longtime girlfriend Elena Henrard in June 2023.

== Playing style ==
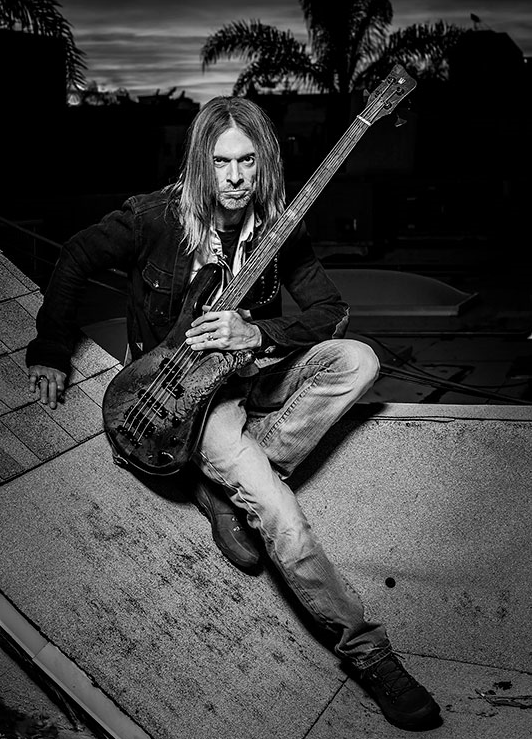
Brown in 2017

Brown was a jazz bassist and was offered a scholarship by the University of North Texas, but declined. He often plays with a pick, and tapes up the tips of the fingers on his fretting hand to avoid skin wearing down due to his use of slides.

Brown was notable for often contributing walking basslines underneath Dimebag Darrell's guitar solos. Standout tracks include "Floods", "Walk", "5 Minutes Alone", "Throes of Rejection", "Cowboys from Hell", "Living Through Me (Hells' Wrath)", "I Can't Hide", "Use My Third Arm", "Where You Come From", "This Love", and "I'm Broken", among others.

== Endorsements ==
Over the years, Brown has used Charvel (used on Cowboys from Hell), Jackson, Fernandes and Music Man basses (used on Vulgar Display of Power); he eventually endorsed Spector bass guitars, and in 2011, a custom RXT prototype was made by Stuart Spector directly for Brown. In 2019, Brown offered this bass for sale on Reverb.com along with 70 other pieces of studio and stage gear he had used.

Gibson introduced a Rex Brown Signature bass model in July 2022, based on the Gibson Thunderbird, but with a more slender neck, and an extender for drop D tuning.

He used Ampeg amps on Vulgar Display of Power.

As of 2025, he uses a Kemper Profiler.

== Discography ==
Solo

- 2017 Smoke on This…

Pantera

- 1983 Metal Magic
- 1984 Projects in the Jungle
- 1985 I Am the Night
- 1988 Power Metal
- 1990 Cowboys from Hell
- 1992 Vulgar Display of Power
- 1994 Far Beyond Driven
- 1996 The Great Southern Trendkill
- 2000 Reinventing the Steel

Down

- 2002 Down II: A Bustle in Your Hedgerow
- 2007 Down III: Over the Under
- 2010 Diary of a Mad Band: Europe in the Year of VI CD/DVD

Crowbar

- 2005 Lifesblood for the Downtrodden

David Allan Coe and Cowboys from Hell

- 2006 Rebel Meets Rebel

Kill Devil Hill

- 2012 Kill Devil Hill
- 2013 Revolution Rise

Elegant Weapons

- 2023 Horns for a Halo

=== Collaborations ===
- 1998 – Jerry Cantrell – Boggy Depot ("Dickeye", "My Song", "Keep the Light On", "Satisfy", and "Hurt a Long Time")
- 2008 – Cavalera Conspiracy – Inflikted ("Ultra-Violent")
