= Vinnie Paul =

American drummer (1964–2018)

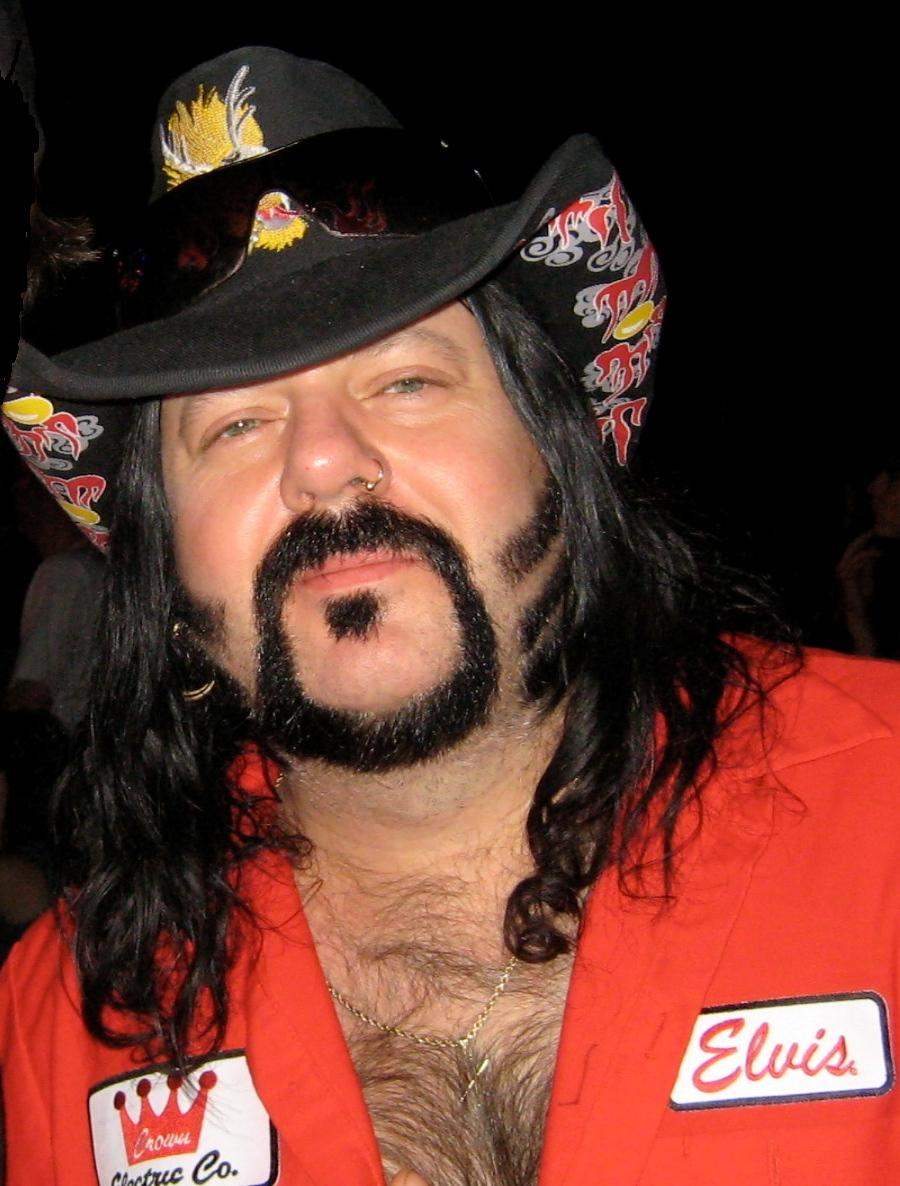
- Vinnie Paul in 2008

Background information
- Born: Vincent Paul Abbott; March 11, 1964; Abilene, Texas, U.S.
- Died: June 22, 2018 (aged 54) Las Vegas, Nevada, U.S.
- Genres: Groove metal; heavy metal; Southern metal; glam metal (early)
- Occupations: Musician; producer
- Instrument: Drums
- Years active: 1976–2018
- Formerly of: Pantera; Damageplan; Hellyeah; Rebel Meets Rebel; Gasoline
- Relatives: Jerry Abbott (father); Dimebag Darrell (brother)

Vincent Paul Abbott (March 11, 1964 – June 22, 2018) was an American musician best known as the drummer of heavy metal band Pantera. He co-founded the band alongside his younger brother, "Dimebag" Darrell Abbott, which has since been regarded as one of the most influential metal bands in history. After Pantera's original disbandment, Abbott also co-founded Damageplan in 2003 and was a member of Hellyeah from 2006 until his death in 2018. Several outlets have ranked Abbott among the greatest metal drummers of all time.

== Early life and influences ==
Vincent Paul Abbott was born in Abilene, Texas, on March 11, 1964. His parents were Jerry, a country music songwriter and producer, and Carolyn Abbott. Abbott originally played the tuba after being assigned to it in school band class, but he was directed towards the drums by his father, who said there were no career prospects for a tuba player. His father bought him his first drum kit. Abbott cited Peter Criss, Alex Van Halen and Tommy Aldridge as his biggest drumming influences.

== Career ==
=== Pantera ===
Abbott formed the heavy metal band Pantera in 1981 with his brother Darrell Abbott and Terry Glaze on guitars, bassist Tommy D. Bradford, and vocalist Donnie Hart. Upon Hart's departure, Terry Glaze assumed vocal duties. Bradford left the band in the summer of 1982 and was replaced by Rex Brown. The band released three albums with this lineup.

Pantera recruited vocalist Phil Anselmo in 1987 and released Power Metal in 1988. In 1990, the band was signed to Atco Records and released Cowboys from Hell, which was a turning point for the band. Over the course of four subsequent studio albums, a live album and a greatest hits compilation, Abbott and Pantera were nominated for four Grammys for Best Metal Performance for the songs "I'm Broken", "Suicide Note Pt. I", "Cemetery Gates", and "Revolution Is My Name".

In 2001, Anselmo put Pantera on hold because of back pain while still touring and recording with his side projects. Pantera officially disbanded in 2003 for several reasons, mainly due to the ongoing dispute between Anselmo and the Abbott brothers, although Rex Brown remained neutral. In the years following, animosity would stir up between Abbott and Anselmo, although Anselmo had publicly stated he wished for Abbott to forgive him and reform their friendship; however, Abbott stated that he was not interested in speaking to Anselmo or Brown.

=== Damageplan ===
After the breakup of Pantera, the Abbott brothers formed the band Damageplan with former tattoo artist Bob Zilla on bass and former Halford guitarist Pat Lachman on lead vocals. Damageplan recorded one album, New Found Power, which was released on February 10, 2004. The song "Ashes to Ashes", a collaboration with Jerry Cantrell, was not completed in time to be featured on the album, but was featured on the soundtrack to the 2004 film The Punisher, and featured as a bonus track on the Japanese version of New Found Power.

On December 8, 2004, while on tour to support Damageplan's album, Darrell was shot and killed along with three others by Nathan Gale at the Alrosa Villa in Columbus, Ohio. Damageplan disbanded shortly thereafter. In a 2016 interview with Loudwire, Abbott revealed that there are five unreleased Damageplan tracks meant for the band's second album (originally set to be released in 2005), which only have him and Darrell playing on them. Abbott said that he considered having some of Darrell's favorite singers like Rob Halford of Judas Priest and Chris Cornell of Soundgarden to record vocals for the songs, but did not have time to do it due to focusing on his band Hellyeah.

=== Hellyeah ===
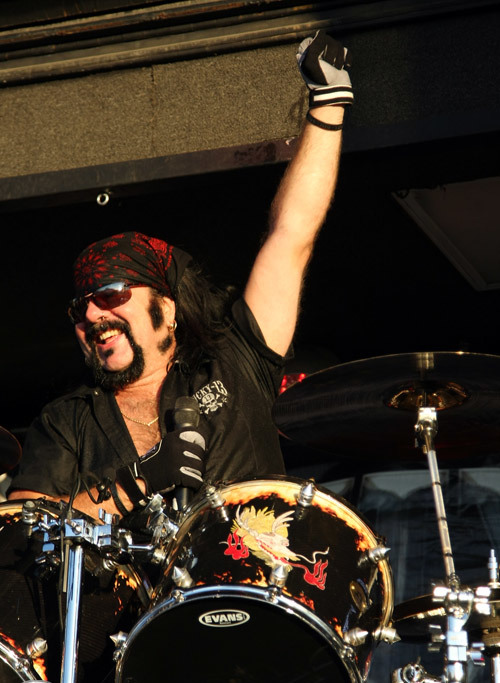
Abbott performing with Hellyeah

After the death of Darrell, Abbott formed Big Vin Records in February 2006 and released Rebel Meets Rebel and a DVD, Dimevision, Volume 1. Abbott, along with Cristina Scabbia (co-lead vocalist of Lacuna Coil), wrote a monthly question-and-answer column in Revolver. Abbott maintained endorsement deals with ddrum, Sabian cymbals, and Vic Firth drumsticks. He previously endorsed Tama Drums, Pearl drums, and Remo drumheads and hardware.

In June 2006, after an 18-month hiatus, Abbott joined the heavy metal supergroup Hellyeah, which featured vocalist Chad Gray and guitarist Greg Tribbett from Mudvayne, guitarist Tom Maxwell from Nothingface, and Damageplan bassist Bob Zilla, who replaced original bassist Jerry Montano. Abbott recorded six studio albums with the band. In May 2019, it was announced that Hellyeah would tour for the first time since Abbott's death to support the final album he recorded with the band, Welcome Home. Stone Sour drummer Roy Mayorga was chosen as Abbott's replacement.

=== Collaborations ===
In 1995, he mixed the songs "Narcissiques anonymes" and "Nits" on Ego, the first album of a Quebec metal band called TSPC.

In November 2008, he picked several of his drum parts to demonstrate in a promotional video for the drum company ddrum: "Use My Third Arm", "Primal Concrete Sledge", "13 Steps to Nowhere", "Domination", and "Becoming". In 2009, he started American Drummer Champions with the aide of friend and influence M. Ludowise, former Downset drummer.

In August 2013, Abbott was featured in a music video for Black Label Society's cover of "Ain't No Sunshine", appearing alongside a horse-masked Zakk Wylde. Wylde and Abbott were close friends, with Wylde also having been particularly close with Abbott's brother Darrell before his death in 2004.

For several years, Abbott tried to publish a cookbook called Drumming up an Appetite with Vinnie Paul; his girlfriend, Chelsey Yeager, initially mentioned potential for a posthumous release in 2020, but it was only eventually released on March 11, 2025.

== Death ==
On June 22, 2018, Abbott died at his Las Vegas home at age 54. It was later revealed that Abbott had died from dilated cardiomyopathy and coronary artery disease. News of his death was initially released on the Pantera Facebook page, stating his association with the bands Pantera, Damageplan, and Hellyeah, along with a statement requesting that the privacy of his family be respected. Five days before his death, Abbott's final performance took place at The Vinyl at the Hard Rock Hotel and Resort in Las Vegas.

Following his death, tributes were made by members of Black Sabbath, Guns N' Roses, Metallica, Megadeth, Alice in Chains, Lamb of God, Periphery, Slipknot, Avenged Sevenfold, the Acacia Strain and In Flames. He is buried beside his mother, Carolyn, and brother, Darrell, at Moore Memorial Gardens Cemetery in Arlington, Texas. In late 2020, a protective fence was installed around the Abbott burial ground in an effort to stop vandalism; years earlier, following the defacing of his brother's grave, Abbott had remarked that the vandalism was "a real disrespectful thing".

== Equipment ==
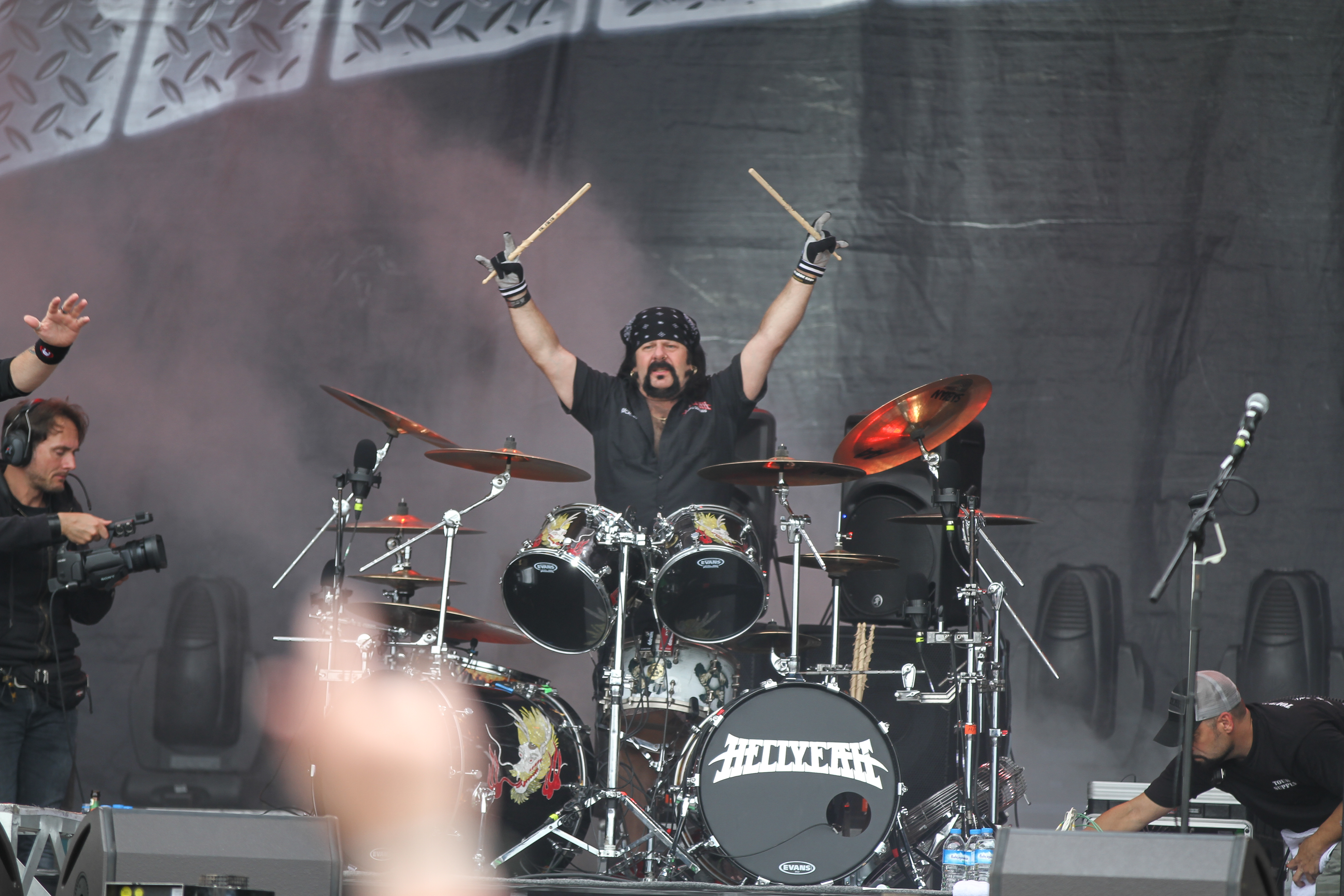
Abbott performing with Hellyeah in 2013

Abbott used Tama drums for Cowboys from Hell and Vulgar Display of Power. On Far Beyond Driven he used Remo drums. Abbott endorsed Remo until The Great Southern Trendkill, when he changed his endorsement to Pearl drums. He endorsed Pearl from 1996 until 2008, when he made his latest change to ddrum. Abbott used Sabian cymbals and Vic Firth drumsticks throughout his career. He played the drumsticks backwards, holding the tapered end of the sticks. The tapered ends were carved to give extra grip. Abbott was also known for using triggered samples mixed with live-miced drums during live shows. Starting in 2010, he used a ddrum Vinnie Paul signature series drum kit, with Evans drum heads, drum hardware, ddrum and Roland electronics, and Danmar red wood beaters and kick pads.

== Discography ==
=== Damageplan ===
- New Found Power (2004)

=== David Allan Coe and Cowboys from Hell ===
- Rebel Meets Rebel (2006)

== Bibliography ==
- Abbott, Vinnie Paul (2025). Drumming Up An Appetite With Vinnie Paul. Z2. ISBN 9798886561234.
