= Terry Date =

American record producer (born 1956)

- Born: January 31, 1956 (age 70); Lansing, Michigan, U.S.
- Genres: Rock; heavy metal; hard rock; thrash metal; alternative metal; groove metal; nu metal
- Occupations: Record producer; audio engineer
- Years active: 1984–present

Terry Date (born January 31, 1956) is an American record producer and audio engineer specializing in rock genres, especially heavy metal. He is well known for his work with Metal Church, Dream Theater, Soundgarden, Overkill, Pantera, Dark Angel, Fishbone, Prong, White Zombie, Deftones, Limp Bizkit and Bring Me the Horizon.

== Works ==
Production/Engineering/Mixing

- Metal Church – Metal Church (1984)
- The Cowboys – How the West Was Rocked (1985)
- Fifth Angel – Fifth Angel (1986)
- Metal Church – The Dark (1986)
- Fifth Angel – Time Will Tell (1986)
- Chastain – The 7th of Never (1987)
- Sir Mix-A-Lot – Swass (1988)
- Liege Lord – Master Control (1988)
- Sanctuary – Refuge Denied (1988)
- The Accüsed – Martha Splatterhead's Maddest Stories Ever Told (1988)
- Chastain – The Voice of the Cult (1988)
- Metal Church – Blessing in Disguise (1989)
- Dream Theater – When Dream and Day Unite (1989)
- Soundgarden – Louder Than Love (1989)
- Overkill – The Years of Decay (1989)
- Mother Love Bone – Apple (1990)
- Pantera – Cowboys from Hell (1990)
- Overkill – Horrorscope (1991)
- Dark Angel – Time Does Not Heal (1991)
- Soundgarden – Badmotorfinger (1991)
- Screaming Trees – Uncle Anesthesia (1991)
- Pantera – Vulgar Display of Power (1992)
- 24-7 Spyz – Strength in Numbers (1992)
- Mantissa - Mossy God (1992)
- Fishbone – Give a Monkey a Brain and He'll Swear He's the Center of the Universe (1993)
- Mind Funk – Dropped (1993)
- Prong – Cleansing (1994)
- Pantera – Far Beyond Driven (1994)
- Deftones – Adrenaline (1995)
- White Zombie – Astro Creep: 2000 - Songs of Love, Destruction and Other Synthetic Delusions of the Electric Head (1995)
- Pantera – The Great Southern Trendkill (1996)
- Prong – Rude Awakening (1996)
- Animal Bag – Image Damage (1996)
- Deftones – Around the Fur (1997)
- Helmet – Aftertaste (1997) (Mixed)
- Soundgarden – A-Sides (1997)
- Handsome – Handsome (1997)
- Incubus – S.C.I.E.N.C.E. (1997)
- Staind – Dysfunction (1999)
- Limp Bizkit – Significant Other (1999)
- Big Daddy Official Soundtrack (1999)
- Deftones – White Pony (2000)
- Limp Bizkit – Chocolate Starfish and the Hot Dog Flavored Water (2000)
- Limp Bizkit – New Old Songs (2001)
- Snoop Dogg – Greatest Hits (2001)
- Otep – Sevas Tra (2002)
- Soulfly – 3 (2002)
- Lito & Polaco – Mundo Frío (2002)
- Deftones – Deftones (2003)
- Limp Bizkit – Results May Vary (2003)
- The Matrix Reloaded Soundtrack (2003)
- Tony Hawk's Pro Skater 3: Official Soundtrack (2003)
- Soulfly – Prophecy (2004)
- 'A' – Teen Dance Ordinance (2005)
- Funeral for a Friend – Hours (2005)
- Ozzy Osbourne – Prince of Darkness (Box Set) (2005)
- Korn – See You on the Other Side (2005)
- Dredg – Catch Without Arms (2005)
- Soulfly – Dark Ages (2005)
- Unearth – III: In the Eyes of Fire (2006)
- EchoGram – EchoGram (2006)
- Smashing Pumpkins – Zeitgeist (2007)
- Emanuel – Black Earth Tiger (2007)
- Fear Nuttin Band – Yardcore (2008)
- The Fall of Troy – In the Unlikely Event (2009)
- Arkaea – Years in Darkness (2009) (Mixed)
- Rev Theory – Justice (2011)
- Loaded – The Taking (2011)
- Arms of the Sun – Arms of the Sun (2011)
- Bring Me the Horizon – Sempiternal (2013)
- Soulfly – Savages (2013)
- After the Burial – Wolves Within (2013)
- Miss May I – Rise of the Lion (2014)
- Havok – Unnatural Selection (2014)
- Insobrio – Under the Surface (2014)
- Slayer – Repentless (2015)
- Centrilia - In the Name of Nothing (2019) (Mixed)
- Deftones – Ohms (2020)
- Pantera – Reinventing the Steel (20th Anniversary Edition) (2020)
- Soundgarden – unnamed album (2026)
