= Call to Arms (C4 album) =

Studio album by C4
- Released: March 2001
- Studio: Monster Mix Studio (Chicago, Illinois)
- Genre: Heavy metal; hard rock
- Length: 40:54
- Label: M.A.C.E.
- Producer: Michael Angelo Batio

Michael Angelo Batio chronology
Lucid Intervals and Moments of Clarity (2000)	Call to Arms (2001)	Holiday Strings (2001)

Call to Arms is the sole album by American heavy metal band C4, a one-off group consisting of guitarist Michael Angelo Batio, vocalist Dan Lenegar, bassist William Kopecky and drummer John Mrozek. Recorded and self-produced by the guitarist at Monster Mix Studio in Chicago, Illinois, it was released in March 2001 on his own label, M.A.C.E. Music. The album contains recordings of songs originally written for Batio's earlier groups, Holland (1984–1986) and Nitro (1988–1993).

== Background ==
The origins of C4 date back to July 2000, when guitarist Michael Angelo Batio and vocalist Dan Lenegar met and performed together for the first time at Summerfest in Milwaukee, Wisconsin. Batio subsequently invited Lenegar to perform vocals on his next solo album, which quickly evolved into a full band with the addition of bassist William Kopecky and drummer John Mrozek. The four-piece recorded their debut album Call to Arms later that year, using songs written by Batio and former bandmates in Holland and Nitro in the 1980s and 1990s. After recording Call to Arms, the band began performing live under the name C4 in December 2000.

Call to Arms was released on Batio's own label M.A.C.E. Music in March 2001 and officially launched at a show at The Brat Stop in Kenosha, Wisconsin on March 24. The band promoted the album at several US tour dates between April and June 2001. Later in the year, the group began working on a second album of original material with new bassist Dan Buckley, as well as continuing to tour in promotion of Call to Arms. In the fall of 2002, it was reported on the M.A.C.E. website that the album had been completed and scheduled for release that October, preceded by lead single "Take Your Bully Down". The album was ultimately never released.

Following its initial release, Call to Arms was issued in Brazil by Rock Brigade and Laser Company Records, featuring "Voices of the Distant Past" from Batio's third solo album Tradition as a bonus track. A later Taiwanese reissue featured two bonus tracks: "Quick Start" and "What I Will and Won't Do". The title track of Call to Arms was later featured on Batio's first greatest hits compilation Shred Force 1: The Essential MAB, released by Rat Pak Records in 2015.

== Critical reception ==
A review published by Guitar Nine praised Call to Arms for featuring "some of the best songs that Angelo has participated in writing", suggesting that "After one listen you will be humming the songs and shaking your head as to how Angelo played so tasteful, yet ripped and didn't hold anything back." The feature praised vocalist Lenegar's "powerful performances" on the album, as well as drummer Mrozek's "first class" playing. Whiplash.net writer Thiago Sarkis also praised the album and highlighted "Basics of the Bullet" as its "masterpiece".

== Track listing ==
No.	Title	Writer(s)	Length
1.	"Gotta Run"	Tommy Holland; Michael Angelo Batio; Joey Cetner; Brad Rohrssen	3:52
2.	"Love In on Time"	Holland; Batio; Cetner; Rohrssen	3:13
3.	"Call to Arms"	Batio; Roan Reynolds	4:37
4.	"All I Want"	Holland; Batio	3:54
5.	"That's When It Hurts"	Holland; Batio; Cetner; Rohrssen	4:28
6.	"Heartbeat"	Holland; Cetner; Rohrssen	4:39
7.	"Basics of the Bullet"	Holland; Batio; Cetner; Rohrssen	4:09
8.	"High Life"	Holland; Batio; Cetner; Rohrssen	4:09
9.	"I Want It"	Holland; Batio; Cetner; Rohrssen	3:43
10.	"Crazy Love"	Jim Gillette; Batio; Howie Hubberman	4:06
Total length:			40:54

Brazilian version bonus track
No.	Title	Writer(s)	Length
11.	"Voices of the Distant Past"	Batio	6:06
Total length:			47:00

2003 Taiwanese reissue bonus tracks
No.	Title	Length
11.	"Quick Start"	5:08
12.	"What I Will and Won't Do"	4:40
Total length:		50:42

Notes

- Tracks 1, 2, 7, 8 and 9 were originally recorded by Holland and released on Little Monsters (1985)
- Track 6 was originally recorded by Holland and released on Heartbeat: The Reunion Project (1993)
- Track 10 was originally recorded by Nitro and released on Nitro II: H.W.D.W.S. (1992)

== Personnel ==
C4

- Michael Angelo Batio – guitar, keyboards, production, engineering
- Dan Lenegar – lead and backing vocals
- William Kopecky – bass
- John Mrozek – drums, backing vocals

Additional personnel

- Chris Djuricic – mixing
- Trevor Sadler – mastering
- Phil Carlson – artwork, design
- Chris Erbach – photography
