= Legacy (The Flyin' Ryan Brothers album) =

Studio album by The Flyin' Ryan Brothers
- Released: 2002
- Recorded: 2002 at The Garage, Streamwood, Illinois
- Genre: Progressive rock, instrumental rock
- Length: 57:46
- Label: M.A.C.E.
- Producer: The Flyin' Ryan Brothers

The Flyin' Ryan Brothers chronology
Colorama (1999)	Legacy (2002)	The Chaos Sampler (2003)

Legacy is the third album by American progressive rock band The Flyin' Ryan Brothers, released in 2002.

== Track listing ==
CD (5-1028)
No.	Title	Length
1.	"Amazing Grace" (instrumental)	0:45
2.	"Legacy" (instrumental)	3:01
3.	"St. Stephen's Green" (instrumental)	1:40
4.	"Maol Mori" (instrumental)	3:47
5.	"First Blood"	4:31
6.	"Leprechaun's Ball" (instrumental)	4:09
7.	"Baja Breeze" (instrumental)	3:57
8.	"Fairehaven" (instrumental)	4:10
9.	"Cliffs of Moher" (instrumental)	5:34
10.	"Lullaby" (instrumental)	0:39
11.	"Red Red Rose" (instrumental)	1:47
12.	"Sweet Virginia"	3:44
13.	"Stevie Dan" (instrumental)	4:52
14.	"Yeah, Man!" (instrumental)	2:00
15.	"Harmony"	4:31
16.	"Legacy Reprise" (instrumental)	1:08
17.	"Dancer"	4:06
18.	"Take 41" (instrumental)	3:17
Total length:		57:46

== Personnel ==
- Jimmy Ryan – guitars, keyboards, percussion programming, lead vocals, backing vocals, production, arrangements, engineering, mixing, mastering, executive production, design
- Johnny Ryan – guitars, keyboards, percussion programming, lead vocals, backing vocals, production, arrangements, engineering, mixing, mastering
- Bob Behnke – drums on "Legacy", "Maol Mori", "First Blood", "Yeah, Man!", "Harmony" and "Legacy Reprise"
- Chacho – bass on "Maol Mori", "First Blood", "Yeah, Man!" and "Harmony"
- Johnny Mrozek – drums on "Baja Breeze", "Cliffs of Moher" and "Stevie Dan", percussion on "Legacy", "Leprechaun's Ball", "Baja Breeze", "Cliss of Moher", "Sweet Virginia" and "Harmony", lead vocals on "First Blood"
- William Kopecky – bass on "Legacy", "Leprechaun's Ball", "Baja Breeze", "Stevie Dan" and "Legacy Reprise", fretless bass on "Amazing Grace" and "Cliffs of Moher"
- Danny Daniels – keyboards on "Red Red Rose" and "Sweet Virginia"
- Jim McClain – vocals on "First Blood"
- Michael Angelo Batio – mixing, mastering
- Dorothy Kosior – typesetting
- Julie Ryan – photography
