= Hands Without Shadows 2 – Voices =

Studio album by Michael Angelo Batio
- Released: September 8, 2009
- Recorded: 2009
- Genre: Progressive metal, neoclassical metal
- Length: 58:22
- Label: M.A.C.E.

Michael Angelo Batio chronology
2 X Again (2007)	Hands Without Shadows 2 – Voices (2009)	Intermezzo (2013)

Hands Without Shadows 2 – Voices (commonly abbreviated as HWS2) is the sixth studio album by American progressive metal musician Michael Angelo Batio, released on September 8, 2009. Unlike the majority of his previous albums, which were almost exclusively instrumental, HWS2 features vocal performances on all tracks. The album features a number of guest musicians, in addition to vocalist Warren Dunlevy, Jr. and drummer Joe Babiak, who previously performed on Batio's 2007 compilation album 2 X Again. The album features a bonus track entitled "MAB Forum Shreddathon", which includes guitar solos by members of the official MAB forum, written by Los Angeles–based metal guitarist and longtime forum member Maxxxwell Carlisle.

== Track listing ==
No.	Title	Writer(s)	Length
1.	"Dial in That Frequency"	Michael Angelo Batio	0:24
2.	"Tribute to Dimebag" (Pantera medley: "Cemetery Gates", "This Love", "Cowboys from Hell")	Phil Anselmo, Dimebag Darrell, Rex Brown, Vinnie Paul	7:37
3.	"Clapton Is God" (Eric Clapton medley: "Layla", "Badge", "Sunshine of Your Love")	Eric Clapton, Jim Gordon, George Harrison, Jack Bruce, Pete Brown	6:05
4.	"Metallica Rules" (Metallica medley: "For Whom the Bell Tolls", "Welcome Home (Sanitarium)", "Master of Puppets", "Enter Sandman" feat. Mark Tremonti and Bill Peck)	James Hetfield, Lars Ulrich, Cliff Burton, Kirk Hammett	8:40
5.	"EVH" (Van Halen medley: "Panama", "Eruption", "Ain't Talkin' 'Bout Love", "Jump", "Unchained", "Runnin' With the Devil")	Eddie Van Halen, Alex Van Halen, Michael Anthony, David Lee Roth	8:00
6.	"Symphony of Destruction" (Megadeth cover feat. Vinnie Moore and George Bellas)	Dave Mustaine	6:43
7.	"For Jimi: All Along the Watchtower" (The Jimi Hendrix Experience cover)	Bob Dylan	5:41
8.	"Tribute to Randy 2: You Can't Kill Rock and Roll" (Ozzy Osbourne cover)	Ozzy Osbourne, Randy Rhoads, Bob Daisley	3:53
9.	"On the Double" (feat. David Shankle)	Batio	3:32
10.	"MAB Forum Shreddathon" (feat. MAB forum members)	Batio	9:47

== Personnel ==
- Michael Angelo Batio – guitars
- Warren Dunlevy, Jr. – vocals
- Joe Babiak – drums
