= Gunnin' for Glory =

Compilation album by Nitro
- Released: 1998
- Genre: Glam metal, heavy metal
- Length: 41:46
- Label: M.A.C.E.
- Producer: Michael Angelo Batio

Nitro chronology
Nitro II: H.W.D.W.S. (1991)	Gunnin' for Glory (1998)

Gunnin' for Glory is a compilation album by American glam metal band Nitro, consisting of older demos from the O.F.R. and H.W.D.W.S. sessions, as well as three tracks by Michael Angelo Batio's former band, the Michael Angelo Band.

== Track listing ==
No.	Title	Writer(s)	Performer	Length
1.	"Freight Train"	Michael Angelo, Jim Gillette	Nitro	3:58
2.	"Shot Heard 'Round the World"	Angelo, Gillette	Nitro	4:05
3.	"Long Way from Home"	Angelo, Gillette	Nitro	4:58
4.	"Prisoner of Paradise"	Angelo, Gillette	Nitro	4:18
5.	"Drivin' Me Crazy"	Allen Hearn, Angelo, Michael Cordet	Michael Angelo Band	4:19
6.	"Love Strikes Back"	Angelo	Michael Angelo Band	4:21
7.	"Victim of Circumstance"	Angelo, Cordet	Michael Angelo Band	3:51
8.	"Nasty Reputation"	Angelo, Gillette	Nitro	4:45
9.	"Heaven's Just a Heartbeat Away"	Angelo, Gillette	Nitro	3:55
10.	"Gunnin' for Glory"	Angelo, Gillette	Nitro	3:36

== Personnel ==
Nitro

- Jim Gillette – vocals
- Michael Angelo – guitars, bass, backing vocals, production, executive production
- T.J. Racer – bass
- Paul Cammarata – drums
- Bobby Rock – drums on "Freight Train"

Michael Angelo Band

- Michael Cordet – vocals
- Michael Angelo – guitars, bass, backing vocals, production, executive production
- Allen Hearn – bass, backing vocals
- Paul Cammarata – drums
