= Intermezzo (album) =

Studio album by Michael Angelo Batio
- Released: November 14, 2013
- Genre: Heavy metal, instrumental rock, progressive metal, neoclassical metal
- Length: 56:06
- Label: M.A.C.E.
- Producer: Michael Angelo Batio, Dan Gonzalez, Maxwell Carlisle

Michael Angelo Batio chronology
Backing Tracks (2010)	Intermezzo (2013)	Shred Force 1: The Essential MAB (2015)

Intermezzo is the seventh studio album by American progressive metal musician Michael Angelo Batio. Self-produced by Batio and featuring a wide range of guest musicians, it was released in November 2013 by M.A.C.E. Music.

== Composition ==
When asked about the writing and recording process of Intermezzo, Batio has claimed that his goal was to create an album which "[had his] signature MAB sound, but not rehash or repeat riffs and solo passages from the past", pointing out that he "used new riffs and new ways of putting solos together that [he hadn't] used before". The guitarist also noted that, in writing the material for the album, he recorded "more than 200 different song parts and ideas" on his phone whilst touring, refining the ideas later. Batio has also claimed that he believes Intermezzo to be his heaviest album released to date.

== Album title ==
Speaking in an interview in 2013, Batio explained the meaning of the title Intermezzo and its relevance to the album:

The term intermezzo is an Italian musical term which denotes a piece of music that is in between two major parts of an opera. During longer operas there would be an intermission and during that time there would be musical pieces that would be played titled intermezzos. Sometimes these works would become more popular than what was being played before and after. I have had an amazing career up [until] now and there are a lot of amazing things going on within music. I consider myself to be in that intermezzo phase with my career.

== Track listing ==
No.	Title	Writer(s)	Length
1.	"Intermezzo"	Michael Angelo Batio	4:57
2.	"Kaleidoscope Images"	Batio	5:24
3.	"Oceans of Time"	Batio	6:33
4.	"I Pray the Lord"	Batio	6:11
5.	"8 Pillars of Steel" (featuring Elliott Dean Rubinson, Dave Reffett, Jeff Loomis, Rusty Cooley, George Lynch, Andrea Martongelli and Craig Goldy)	Batio, Marc McNally	9:06
6.	"The Possession – A Tone Poem"	Batio	4:46
7.	"5 Four Ever" (featuring Alex Stornello and Guthrie Govan)	Batio	5:46
8.	"Juggernaut" (featuring Chris Poland, Dave Reffett, Annie Grunwald, Guthrie Govan, Michael Lepond and Michael Romeo)	Dave Reffett, Jason Glick	4:43
9.	"Overload Intro" (featuring Florent Atem)	Florent Atem	0:46
10.	"Overload" (featuring Tobias Hurwitz, Ken Burridge, Darren Burridge, Bill Peck, Peter Ema, Joe Rose, Joe Stump, Florent Atem and Maxxxwell Carlisle)	Maxwell Carlisle	7:54

== Personnel ==
Primary personnel

- Michael Angelo Batio – guitars, arrangements, production
- Dan Gonzalez – engineering, co-production (track 8)
- Chris Wilco – mixing (tracks 1 to 8), mastering
- Bob St. John – mixing (track 9)

Guest musicians

- Florent Atem – guitar (tracks 9 and 10), acoustic guitar and bass (track 9)
- Dave Reffett – guitar (tracks 5 and 8)
- Guthrie Govan – guitar (tracks 7 and 8)
- Jeff Loomis – guitar (track 5)
- Rusty Cooley – guitar (track 5)
- George Lynch – guitar (track 5)
- Andrea Martongelli – guitar (track 5)
- Craig Goldy – guitar (track 5)
- Elliott Dean Rubinson – bass (track 5)
- Alex Stornello – guitar (track 7)
- Chris Poland – guitar (track 8)
- Annie Grunwald – guitar (track 8)
- Michael Lepond – guitar (track 8)
- Michael Romeo – guitar (track 8)
- Maxxxwell Carlisle – guitar and production (track 10)
- Tobias Hurwitz – guitar (track 10)
- Ken Burridge – guitar (track 10)
- Darren Burridge – guitar (track 10)
- Bill Peck – guitar (track 10)
- Peter Ema – guitar (track 10)
- Joe Rose – guitar (track 10)
- Joe Stump – guitar (track 10)
