= The Flyin' Ryan Brothers =

- Origin: Streamwood, Illinois, USA
- Genres: Progressive rock, instrumental rock
- Years active: 1995–present
- Labels: M.A.C.E., Ryanetics, PMMG, Feedback Records, Grooveyard Records
- Members: Jimmy Ryan; Johnny Ryan
- Website: www.ryanetics.com

The Flyin' Ryan Brothers is an American progressive rock band that formed in Illinois in 1995. It comprises two brothers, Jimmy and Johnny, who between them contribute guitars, bass, drums, keyboards, vocals and many other instruments.

== History ==
Jimmy and Johnny began playing guitar in the late-1960s, at the ages of 14 and 12 respectively. Influenced by their parents—mother Virginia was a pianist, father Edward was a vocalist—they received no formal music training and had joined bands by 1971. After hearing progressive rock band Wishbone Ash (notable for featuring two lead guitarists) on the radio in 1973, the brothers formed a similar band with local musicians by the name of Westfall. They progressed from playing local clubs to having their first studio session and recording their first two tracks, "Everything I Could Ask For" and "Sunshine Daydream", in a short space of time, developing their double lead style along the way. Other bands they played in through the 1970s include Axis, Nutcracker and Freeze, opening for such famous acts as Kiss, Styx, Survivor, Head East and The Beach Boys.

During the 1980s, as the music scene was changing to focus on disco, the brothers began to work separately as session musicians, solo artists and with other bands. It was during this time that Jimmy recorded his solo album Finally and Johnny began building his own studio, known as The Garage, where he also began recording his own music. After some years the brothers reunited, and in 1996 released their debut album, Sibling Revelry, which featured guest appearances from guitarists Michael Angelo Batio and Tommy Dziallo. The Brothers' second album, Colorama, was released in 1999, which featured more guest musicians (in addition to Batio and Dziallo), namely vocalists Jim "Mudpuppy" Wiley, Nick Cortese and Johnny Mrozek. The band's official website was created in February 2000, a process which Johnny values highly, claiming "The internet saved us ... without it, we could have never hoped for more than a regional awareness of our music ... we've established contacts and expanded our fan base across the entire planet." Legacy was released in 2002, followed by Blue Marble and Totality in 2005 and 2008 respectively. Under the Influence, their last album, was released in 2012. In addition to these releases, Jimmy has released a number of solo albums. He released Finally in 1989 (reissued in 1999), Truth Squad – Superkiller in 2003, 21st Century Riffology in 2017, Astral Café in 2021 and The Healing Guitar in 2022.

== Discography ==
- Sibling Revelry (1996)
- Colorama (1999)
- Legacy (2002)
- The Chaos Sampler (2003)
- Blue Marble (2005)
- Totality (2008)
- Under the Influence (2011)

Jimmy Ryan Solo

- Finally (1999)
- Truth Squad – Superkiller (2003)
- 21st Century Riffology (2017)
- Astral Café (2021)
- The Healing Guitar (2022)
