= Hands Without Shadows =

Studio album by Michael Angelo Batio
- Released: October 27, 2005
- Recorded: July 2004–October 2005 at Studio One Racine
- Genre: Instrumental rock, neoclassical metal, progressive metal, shred
- Length: 45:08
- Label: M.A.C.E.
- Producer: Michael Angelo Batio

Michael Angelo Batio chronology
Lucid Intervals and Moments of Clarity Part 2 (2004)	Hands Without Shadows (2005)	2 X Again (2007)

Hands Without Shadows is the fifth studio album by American shred guitarist Michael Angelo Batio. The album consists of four covers, two 'tributes' and two original compositions by Batio. The name refers to the speed at which his hands move when playing guitar, leaving "no shadows".

Batio has said that he wanted the album to be "cohesive" and have "a central theme, sound and continuous atmosphere from beginning to end". He has also said that Hands Without Shadows is "[his] uncompromising vision".

== Track listing ==
No.	Title	Writer(s)	Length
1.	"Burn" (Deep Purple cover)	Ritchie Blackmore, David Coverdale, Jon Lord, Ian Paice	5:29
2.	"Tribute to Randy" (contains elements of "Crazy Train" and "Mr. Crowley")	Ozzy Osbourne, Randy Rhoads, Bob Daisley, Michael Angelo Batio	6:07
3.	"Zeppelin Forever" (contains elements of various Led Zeppelin songs)	Robert Plant, Jimmy Page, John Paul Jones, John Bonham, Batio	7:10
4.	"Hands Without Shadows"	Batio	5:26
5.	"Wherever I May Roam" (Metallica cover)	James Hetfield, Lars Ulrich	5:31
6.	"Dream On" (Aerosmith cover)	Steven Tyler	4:36
7.	"Pray On, Prey"	Batio	5:15
8.	"All Along the Watchtower" (Bob Dylan cover; inspired by Jimi Hendrix)	Bob Dylan	5:34
Total length:			45:08

== Credits ==
- Michael Angelo Batio – lead guitar, rhythm guitars, keyboards, production, arrangements
- William Kopecky – five-string bass, fretless bass
- Bobby Rock – drums
- Mark Tremonti – guitar solo on "Burn"
- Bill Peck – guitar solo on "Zeppelin Forever"
- Doug Marks – guitar solo on "Zeppelin Forever"
- Stuart Bull – guitar solo and jamming on "All Along the Watchtower"
- Rudy Sarzo – bass on "Tribute to Randy"
- Chris Djuricic – engineering, mixing
- Trevor Sadler – mastering
- Stephen Jensen – art direction and design
- Dan Machnik – photography
- Dean Zelinsky – executive production
- Elliot Rubinson – executive production
