= No Boundaries (Michael Angelo Batio album) =

Studio album by Michael Angelo Batio
- Released: April 1994
- Studio: M.A.C.E. Studios (Chicago, Illinois)
- Genre: Heavy metal; instrumental rock; neoclassical metal; speed metal
- Length: 48:17
- Label: M.A.C.E.
- Producer: Michael Angelo Batio

Michael Angelo Batio chronology
No Boundaries (1994)	Planet Gemini (1997)

No Boundaries is the debut solo album by American heavy metal musician Michael Angelo Batio (credited as Michael Angelo). Recorded and self-produced by the guitarist at his own M.A.C.E. Studios in Chicago, Illinois, it was released in April 1994 as the first album on his own label, M.A.C.E. Music. The album consists entirely of instrumental recordings featuring Batio on all instruments, with drummer Rob Ross appearing on three tracks as the only other performer.

== Background ==
Batio began his solo career shortly after the breakup of his previous band Nitro in 1993. That April, he founded his own record label and distribution company, M.A.C.E. Music ("Michael Angelo Creative Enterprise"). Later that year, Batio recorded his debut solo album No Boundaries at his own M.A.C.E. Studios in Chicago, Illinois; he is credited on the album as performing all electric, acoustic and bass guitars, keyboards, programming, drums and percussion, as well as producing, engineering and mixing. The only other performer on the release is Rob Ross, who played drums on the tracks "Rain Forest", "Science Fiction" and "2X Again".

No Boundaries was originally released by M.A.C.E. in April 1994. It was initially reissued by Thermometer Sound Surface in September 1995. A later M.A.C.E. reissue in 2002 featured two bonus tracks, "Dream Up" and "Give Me Jimi", both of which had earlier been featured on the promotional release Jam with Michael Angelo. Several songs (all but "Intro" and "The Finish Line") were remixed and remastered, with additional drums by Joe Babiak, for the 2007 release 2 X Again. The 2 X Again versions of "Rain Forest", "No Boundaries" and "Peace" were later featured on the 2015 compilation Shred Force 1: The Essential MAB.

The title track of No Boundaries was originally composed for Batio's 1991 debut instructional video Speed Kills, in which he plays the piece "to illustrate every neoclassical shred technique known to man". In an interview for Guitar.com, Batio explained that he "didn't even know the song ... would be popular". "No Boundaries" was also the subject of the 2004 video Speed Lives, in which the guitarist instructs how to play the song in 27 individual parts. For his third Speed Lives video in 2009, Batio provided a tutorial on how to play fellow No Boundaries track "The Finish Line", which he claims contains "Basically every modern guitar technique".

== Critical reception ==
In a review published by Guitar Nine, Kevin Prowse claims that No Boundaries is "heralded as one of the top ten instrumental guitar CDs of the 90s", describing it as "a diverse collection of musical styles ranging from rock, metal, blues, neoclassical and funk". Highlighting the songs "Science Fiction", "Rain Forest" and "No Boundaries" in particular, Prowse praised Batio's performances on the album for exhibiting "a mastery of various lead techniques like speed picking, string skipping, arpeggios and cross string tapping".

== Track listing ==
All tracks are written by Michael Angelo Batio.

No.	Title	Length
1.	"Intro: This CD Is Dedicated to You"	1:54
2.	"Rain Forest"	6:29
3.	"Science Fiction"	6:32
4.	"Peace"	6:28
5.	"I Do for You"	5:48
6.	"The Jam Game"	5:34
7.	"2X Again"	5:27
8.	"No Boundaries"	3:43
9.	"The Finish Line"	2:01
10.	"Outsideinside"	4:21
Total length:		48:17

2002 reissue bonus tracks
No.	Title	Length
11.	"Dream Up"	5:26
12.	"Give Me Jimi"	4:51
Total length:		58:34

== Personnel ==
- Michael Angelo Batio – guitars, bass, keyboards, drums, programming, production, engineering, mixing
- Rob Ross – drums on tracks 2, 3 and 7
- Jason Rau – mastering
- Rich Siegle – artwork, design
- Gary Mankus – photography
