= Lucid Intervals and Moments of Clarity =

Studio album by Michael Angelo Batio and Rob Ross
- Released: August 2000
- Studio: Monster Mix Studio (Chicago, Illinois)
- Genre: Heavy metal
- Length: 53:03
- Label: M.A.C.E.
- Producer: Michael Angelo Batio; Rob Ross

Michael Angelo Batio chronology
Tradition (1998)	Lucid Intervals and Moments of Clarity (2000)	Call to Arms (2001)

Lucid Intervals and Moments of Clarity is the fourth solo album by American heavy metal musician Michael Angelo Batio, featuring and co-credited to drummer Rob Ross. Recorded and self-produced by the guitarist at Monster Mix Studio in Chicago, Illinois, it was released in August 2000 on his own label, M.A.C.E. Music. Alongside Batio and Ross, Lucid Intervals... also features bassist William Kopecky, who is credited for performing on four of the album's nine tracks.

== Background ==
Like his previous albums, Michael Angelo Batio recorded Lucid Intervals and Moments of Clarity at his own Monster Mix Studios in Chicago, Illinois; he is credited on the album as performing all guitars, bass and keyboards, while Rob Ross is credited with all drums and percussion. The only other credited performer is William Kopecky, who performs bass on four tracks ("Stop Complaining", "She Doesn't Live Here Anymore", "Diary of an Empty Life" and "Instant Glamour"). The album is Batio's second solo release to feature tracks with vocals, which are performed by Batio himself on "Take a Look Around" and by Ross on "Instant Glamour".

Lucid Intervals and Moments of Clarity was originally released on Batio's own label M.A.C.E. Music in August 2000. It was reissued in 2002 with two additional bonus tracks. Seven of the nine main tracks (all except "Enough Is Enough", "Who Can You Trust?") were later remixed and remastered for the 2004 compilation Lucid Intervals and Moments of Clarity Part 2. "Enough Is Enough" was featured on the 2006 remastered version of Batio's second album, Planet Gemini.

== Critical reception ==
A review published by Guitar Nine praised Lucid Intervals and Moments of Clarity for featuring "memorable verse and chorus melodies highlighted with intense and uncompromising solo sections". The feature suggested that the album was potentially more commercial than its predecessors, highlighting the "majestic and powerful" choruses on "Stop Complaining", as well as the "beautiful and commercial verse melody" on "Take a Look Around", one of two tracks with vocals.

== Track listing ==
All tracks are written by Michael Angelo Batio, except "Instant Glamour" by Frank Miceli.

No.	Title	Length
1.	"Stop Complaining"	6:22
2.	"Avalanche"	5:12
3.	"She Doesn't Live Here Anymore"	6:52
4.	"Take a Look Around"	4:51
5.	"Enough Is Enough"	6:00
6.	"Full Force"	6:40
7.	"Who Can You Trust?"	4:41
8.	"Diary of an Empty Life"	5:59
9.	"Instant Glamour"	6:25
Total length:		53:03

2002 reissue bonus tracks
No.	Title	Length
10.	"Out of Bounds"	5:35
11.	"ZZ's"	5:17
Total length:		63:55

== Personnel ==
- Michael Angelo Batio – guitars, bass, keyboards, vocals on track 4, production, engineering, mixing, arrangement on track 9
- Rob Ross – drums, percussion, vocals on track 9, co-production
- William Kopecky – bass on tracks 1, 3, 8 and 9
- Mark Richardson – mastering
- Phil Carson – artwork, design, layout
- Dan Machnik – photography
