= Sibling Revelry =

Studio album by The Flyin' Ryan Brothers
- Released: 1996
- Recorded: 1995/1996 at The Garage, Streamwood, Illinois and Ryan's Roost, La Valle, Wisconsin
- Genre: Progressive rock, instrumental rock
- Length: 71:12
- Label: M.A.C.E.
- Producer: The Flyin' Ryan Brothers

The Flyin' Ryan Brothers chronology
Sibling Revelry (1996)	Colorama (1999)

Sibling Revelry is the debut album by American progressive rock band The Flyin' Ryan Brothers, released in 1996.

== Track listing ==
CD (1-1028)
No.	Title	Length
1.	"Dreamland"	5:14
2.	"Struttin'" (instrumental)	3:53
3.	"Out of the Blue" (instrumental)	5:04
4.	"Gates of Dawn" (instrumental)	5:33
5.	"In My Mind"	5:38
6.	"Seaside" (instrumental)	1:58
7.	"Mountains of Yore" (instrumental)	5:15
8.	"Blues for You"	4:25
9.	"X Factor" (instrumental)	4:12
10.	"Thank You Dad"	4:36
11.	"Sacred Ground" (instrumental)	3:27
12.	"Gut Wrench Stew" (instrumental)	4:19
13.	"Corporate State of Mind"	5:44
14.	"Waiting for You" (instrumental)	5:32
15.	"Sign of the Times"	5:40
Total length:		71:12

== Personnel ==
- Jimmy Ryan – electric guitars, acoustic guitars, bass, keyboards, EBow, drum programming, sequencers, samplers, sound effects, lead vocals, backing vocals, production, arrangements, mixing, design
- Johnny Ryan – electric guitars, acoustic guitars, bass, keyboards, EBow, drum programming, sequencers, samplers, sound effects, lead vocals, backing vocals, production, arrangements, mixing
- Michael Angelo – lead guitar on "Struttin'" and "X Factor", executive production, mixing
- Tommy Dziallo – lead guitar on "Struttin'" and "Mountains of Yore"
- Pat Lilley – mastering
- Rob Kistner – layout
- Vin Newman – photography
