= OFR (disambiguation) =

The Office of Financial Research (OFR) is a unit of the United States Department of the Treasury.

OFR may also refer to:

- O.F.R. (album), 1989 album by American band Nitro
- Odd Future Records, record label of Los Angeles-based hip hop collective OFWGKTA
- Office of the Federal Register
- Officer of the Order of the Federal Republic (Nigeria)
- On-field review, a practice in VAR assisted matches
- OptimFROG audio codec (uses file extension ".ofr")
