= Holiday Strings =

Studio album by Michael Angelo Batio
- Released: November 2001
- Studio: Monster Mix Studio (Chicago, Illinois)
- Genre: Christmas music; instrumental; acoustic
- Length: 33:13
- Label: M.A.C.E.
- Producer: Michael Angelo Batio

Michael Angelo Batio chronology
Call to Arms (2001)	Holiday Strings (2001)	Lucid Intervals and Moments of Clarity Part 2 (2004)

Holiday Strings is the fifth solo album by American heavy metal musician Michael Angelo Batio (credited as Michael Angelo). Recorded and self-produced by the guitarist at Monster Mix Studio in Chicago, Illinois, it was released in November 2001 on his own label, M.A.C.E. Music. The album features instrumental, primarily acoustic recordings of popular Christmas songs, with all arrangements made and instruments performed by Batio.

== Background ==
Like his previous albums, Michael Angelo Batio recorded Holiday Strings at his own Monster Mix Studio in Chicago, Illinois; he is credited on the album as performing all guitars, piano, keyboards and other instruments, as well as arranging, producing, engineering, mixing and mastering all tracks. In arranging and recording the album, Batio has explained that his intention was "to make a great Christmas, Holiday CD that would be perfect background music for putting up a Christmas tree or having guests and family over for the holidays". He described it as "one of the best experiences I have ever had recording". Holiday Strings was released on Batio's own label M.A.C.E. Music in November 2001. For every sale of the album, M.A.C.E. donated $1 to Joey's Angels, a children's leukemia charity.

== Track listing ==
No.	Title	Writer(s)	Length
1.	"Deck the Halls"	Traditional	2:29
2.	"God Rest Ye Merry, Gentlemen"	Traditional	2:47
3.	"Joy to the World"	George Handel	2:10
4.	"The First Noel"	Traditional	2:47
5.	"Shalom Chaverim"	Traditional	3:15
6.	"O Holy Night"	Adolphe Adam	4:29
7.	"What Child Is This?/We Three Kings of Orient Are"	Traditional/John Hopkins	3:27
8.	"Away in a Manger"	Traditional	2:28
9.	"Do You Hear What I Hear?"	Traditional	3:07
10.	"Silent Night"	Franz Gruber	3:04
11.	"We Wish You a Merry Christmas"	Traditional	3:03
Total length:			33:13

== Personnel ==
- Michael Angelo Batio – guitars, piano, keyboards, other instruments, arrangement, production, engineering, mixing, mastering
- Phil Carlson – artwork design and layout, photography
- Dan Machnik – photography
