= Totality (album) =

Studio album by The Flyin' Ryan Brothers
- Released: June 13, 2008
- Recorded: June 2008
- Genre: Progressive rock, instrumental rock
- Label: Ryanetics
- Producer: The Flyin' Ryan Brothers

The Flyin' Ryan Brothers chronology
Blue Marble (2005)	Totality (2008)

Totality is the sixth album by American progressive rock band The Flyin' Ryan Brothers, released on June 13, 2008.

== Track listing ==
All music is composed by Jimmy Ryan and Johnny Ryan.

No.	Title	Length
1.	"Totality"	1:06
2.	"Escape Velocity"	5:34
3.	"Heritage"	5:29
4.	"The Choir of Eden"	5:30
5.	"The Crosses of Annagh"	3:26
6.	"Aeolian Rhapsody"	6:03
7.	"Big Shotz"	4:54
8.	"Free to Fly"	5:30
9.	"Spirit's Call"	5:34
10.	"Wes Is More"	5:40
11.	"Cosmic Calypso"	4:35
12.	"Now and Forever"	4:02
13.	"Heritage Reprise"	2:53

== Personnel ==
- Jimmy Ryan – electric guitars, lap steel guitar, glockenspiel, sitar, theremin, production
- Johnny Ryan – electric guitars, acoustic guitars, accordion, sitar, keyboards, production
- William Kopecky – bass
- Johnny Mrozek – drums, percussion
- Chris Djuricic – mixing, mastering
