= Flip City =

Flip City may refer to:

- a phrase uttered by Cheech Marin on the 1974 Joni Mitchell album Court and Spark
- a 1974-75 pub rock band featuring Elvis Costello
- a Glenn Frey song from the Ghostbusters II soundtrack
- a song by The Flyin' Ryan Brothers from their 1999 album Colorama
- the fictional hometown of the cartoon RollBots
- an indoor trampoline park located in Palmerston North
