= Shock 'Em Dead =

- Academy Entertainment's original VHS cover
- Directed by: Mark Freed
- Written by: Mark Freed; David Tedder; Andrew Cross
- Produced by: Eric Louzil
- Starring: Stephen Quadros; Traci Lords; Michael Angelo Batio
- Music by: Robert Decker
- Distributed by: Academy Entertainment
- Release date: 1991
- Running time: 94 min.
- Language: English

Shock 'Em Dead, also known as Rock ‘Em Dead, is a 1991 comedy horror film written by Mark Freed, David Tedder and Andrew Cross, and directed by Mark Freed. It stars Stephen Quadros and Traci Lords in one of her first post-adult film roles. The film is a thriller with a music comedy twist, a self-aware take on metal guitarists from the 1980s, and is also notable for featuring Nitro guitarist Michael Angelo Batio as a guitar double. It was Aldo Ray's last film.

== Plot ==
Angel Martin has just made the deal of a lifetime. Fame, fortune and beautiful women will all be his - for a price. To become a rock star Martin must give his soul, and to survive he must feed on the souls of others. But Angel wants to possess more than just the soul of the woman of his dreams.

Lindsay Roberts is the manager of a rising rock band that has a talented new band member. When Angel Martin joined the band she suddenly had her hands full with concerts, contracts—and private meetings with Angel. But success isn't the only new thing in her life: their recent concerts have been marred by a series of brutal killings, which remain unsolved. As Angel lures Lindsay further into his dark mysterious world, the lines are drawn for a terrifying black magic battle against the ultimate evil.

== Cast ==
- Stephen Quadros as Angel Martin
- Michael Angelo Batio as Angel Martin Guitar Double
- Traci Lords as Lindsay Roberts
- Troy Donahue as Record Executive
- Aldo Ray as Tony, The Pizza Shop Owner
- Tim Moffett as Greg
- Jerico DeAngelo as Jake (as Anthony Christian)
- Markus Grupa as Jonny
- Karen Russell as Michelle
- Gina Parks as Marilyn
- Laurel Wiley as Monique
- Tyger Sodipe as Voodoo Woman
- Christopher Maleki as Dustin
- David Homb as Izzy
- Madison Monk as Jimmi Wolf
- Yankee Sulivan as Trailer Manager
- Barne Subaski as Record Executive #2
- Miyako Kirksey as Pizza Girl #1
- Kathleen Kane as Pizza Girl # 2
- Phillip Irwin Cooper as Pizza Boy
- Danny Spear as Officer Corbett
- Mark Richardson as Devin
- Pete Knight as Lead Guitarist #1
- Daniel Sidlow as Lead Guitarist #2
- Ross Hamilton as Peter
- Scott L. Schwartz as Guard
- Dina C. Scott as Groupie #1
- Jackie Moen as Groupie #2
- Jason Adelman as Kid
- Dave Tedder as Cashier
- Frank Callagher as Production Manager
- John Minton as Officer Meak
- Mitch Ford as Officer Reed
- Jan Washburn as Officer Schmidt
- Debra Cross as Receptionist
- Tyler Bowe as Announcer
- Tim Yasui as Spectator
- Richard Strahle as "Porky"

=== Musicians ===
- Rick Livingstone - Lead Vocals
- Michael Angelo Batio - Lead Guitar
- David Celentano - Lead Guitar
- Robert Decker - Producer, Songwriter
- Mark Freed - Songwriter

== Production ==
The band music and guitar solos were pre-recorded except for the final concert scene in which Batio performed live on film. Supplementary solos were pre-recorded and performed live on film by David Celentano. The band cues (except for Purple Haze) were written by Mark Freed and Robert Decker. There was no back-up guitar on the recorded tracks or rhythm guitarist in the film. The lead vocalist on the band tracks is Rick Livingston.

=== Michael Angelo Batio's participation ===
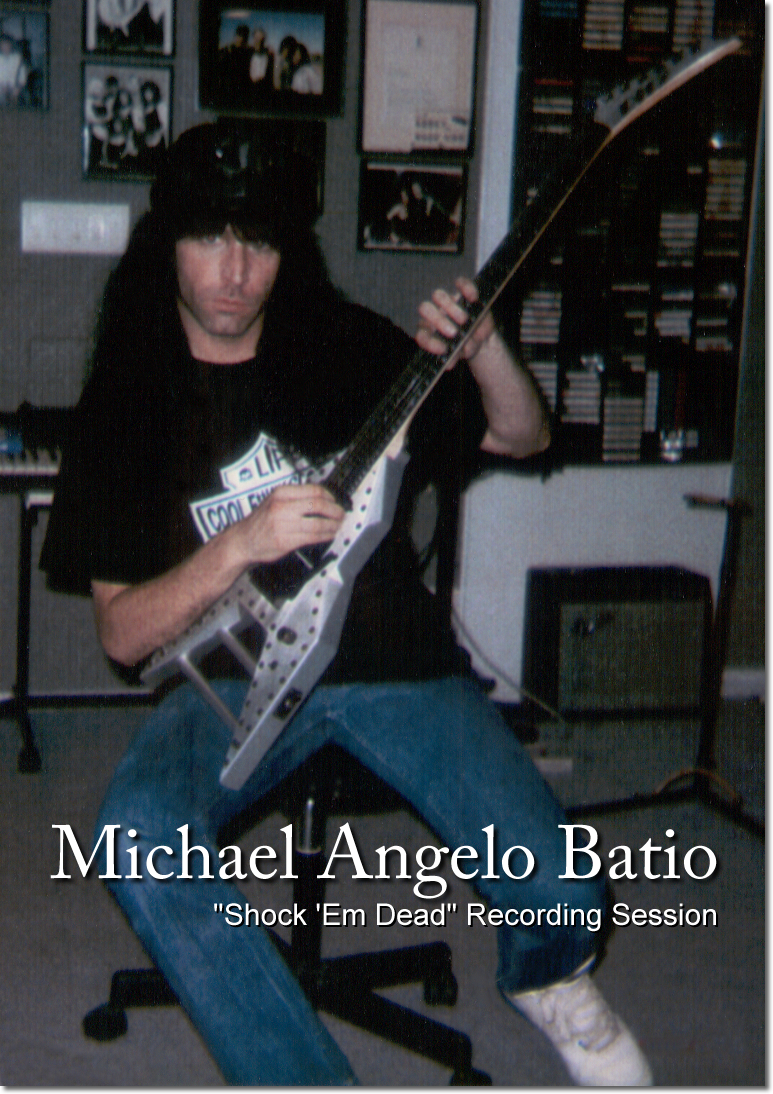
1990 Studio Soundtrack Session

Director Mark Freed recalled: "When we finished writing the script, it was obvious that the movie was going to need more than just an average guitar player to emulate the role of Angel Martin. This ‘character double’ needed to be a heavy metal, highly skillful guitar player with a dynamic stage presence. The producers and myself agreed that the best man for the job would be Michael Angelo Batio. Two years earlier, I produced Michael in a Star Licks Productions instructional guitar video – hence, I knew of his incredible style and technique". "I called Michael to see if he'd be interested in reading the script; he said his schedule was busy but he’d make time for it. Soon afterwards, he said he’d love to get involved – e.g., doubling the guitar shots on film, playing the role of the demon in Martin's dream sequence and overdubbing the guitar tracks for the film’s concert scenes in advance of principal photography". "Many fans have asked me if Michael's guitar parts were sped up in the film. The answer is no, what you see in the film is in fact Michael playing with no special effects".

Producer Robert Decker also recalled: "I recorded the band tracks in my Santa Monica studio utilizing a Korg 01/W workstation, Emax 8-bit sampler, and a Roland R-8 rhythm composer – recorded on a Otari MX one-inch 16-track". "For the session, Michael showed up with a Dean, twin-necked guitar, which I plugged into a Rockman then direct into the board. Preferring a bit more distortion, I patched in a stomp box that Michael brought as well. I don’t believe that he had heard the band tracks prior to the session – so, as a result, Michael took time to work out the main solo and harmony on a single-neck but would refer to the double-neck to verify that the two parts could be performed in a dual-necked fashion. In our quest to get precision solos in one short studio evening, Michael performed his parts on a single-neck for instant accuracy. Overdubs were added for a fatter sound".
