= Freight train (disambiguation) =

A freight train is a railway train that is used to carry cargo.

Freight train may also refer to:

== Media and entertainment ==
- Freight Train (book), a children's book by Donald Crews
- Freight Train (folk song), a song by Elizabeth Cotten
- Freight Train (album), a 2010 album by Alan Jackson
- Freight Train (Nitro song), a song by glam metal band Nitro
- Freight Train Studios, a former recording studio owned by Australian rock singer Jimmy Barnes

== Stage and character names ==
- Freight Train, ring name for wrestler Jimmy Jacobs
- Freight Train (DC Comics), a fictional character from DC Comics
- Freight Train, a character in the TV series Big Time Rush
- Levar "Freight Train" Brown, a minor character in the TV series The Cleveland Show
