= Colorama =

Colorama may refer to:

- Colorama (album), a 1999 album by The Flyin' Ryan Brothers
- Colorama (band), a British psych folk band
- Kodak Colorama, an American photographic display
- Colorama, an American name for the Cinebox
- "Colorama," a segment in the Futurama episode "Reincarnation"
