= Freight Train (Nitro song) =

Single by Nitro

from the album O.F.R.
- Released: 1989
- Recorded: 1988
- Genre: Glam metal
- Length: 3:55
- Label: Rhino
- Songwriter(s): Jim Gillette, Michael Angelo Batio
- Producer(s): Charlie Watts

Nitro singles chronology
"Double Trouble" (1989)	"Freight Train" (1989)	"Long Way from Home" (1989)

"Freight Train" is a song by American heavy metal band Nitro from their 1989 album O.F.R. In the video for the song, Michael Angelo Batio uses the one-of-a-kind quad guitar, which is a guitar with four necks. The top two necks have seven strings and the bottom two have six strings. The guitar was stolen after the second performance of the "Nitro O.F.R" tour in El Paso, Texas. Then, in 2004, a fan showed up to one of Batio's performances with a guitar case. The fan opened up the case to reveal two of the four guitars that had made up the famous quad guitar.

Jim Gillette performs a shriek before the first guitar solo, considered among the highest in popular heavy metal music.

== Music video ==
Howard Johnson writing for Classic Rock ranked the song's video at No. 7 on their list of The Top 10 Best Hair Metal Videos.
