= Tradition (Michael Angelo Batio album) =

1998 American instrumental heavy metal album

Studio album by Michael Angelo Batio
- Released: 1998
- Studio: Monster Mix Studio (Chicago, Illinois)
- Genre: Heavy metal; instrumental rock; neoclassical metal; progressive rock
- Length: 56:22
- Label: M.A.C.E.
- Producer: Michael Angelo Batio

Michael Angelo Batio chronology
Planet Gemini (1997)	Tradition (1998)	Lucid Intervals and Moments of Clarity (2000)

Tradition is the third solo album by American heavy metal musician Michael Angelo Batio (credited as Michael Angelo). Recorded and self-produced by the guitarist at Monster Mix Studio in Chicago, Illinois, it was originally released in 1998 as a companion disc to the instructional video Jam with Angelo, before a standalone release by M.A.C.E. Music followed in 2000. The collection is entirely written and performed by Batio and is entirely instrumental.

== Background ==
Like his previous albums, Michael Angelo Batio recorded Tradition at his own Monster Mix Studios in Chicago, Illinois; he is credited on the album as performing all instruments, as well as producing, engineering and mixing. Prior to its release as Tradition, the album was issued as the companion CD to Jam with Angelo, an instructional video released in late 1998. Alongside seven new songs, the collection features five backing tracks for users of the instructional video.

Following its 1998 release, Tradition was issued as an album in its own right by Batio's label M.A.C.E. Music in 2000. All seven of the main tracks were later remixed and remastered for the 2004 compilation Lucid Intervals and Moments of Clarity Part 2. A number of songs were also featured on instructional videos: "China" and "The Finish Line" on Performance, "Prog" on Speed Kills 3, and "The Finish Line" on Speed Lives 3: The Neo Classical Zone.

== Critical reception ==
A review published by Guitar Nine praised Tradition, with the feature stating that on Batio's "fluid style sends notes gliding and flying all over the fretboard [and] his thick, round sound [makes] the unbelievable passages seem easy and effortless". The review highlighted several tracks in particular, including "Voices of the Distant Past" which the writer called "a progressive rock masterpiece" and "Prog" which they claimed "turns into one of the "coolest" grooves and melodies that Michael has written".

== Track listing ==
All tracks are written by Michael Angelo Batio.

No.	Title	Length
1.	"China"	4:31
2.	"The Finish Line"	5:24
3.	"Prog"	5:27
4.	"I Can't Take It No More"	5:27
5.	"Video Jam"	3:37
6.	"Prog Revisited"	4:21
7.	"Voices of the Distant Past"	6:06
8.	"Video Rhythm Track: Song One" ("Prog" backing track)	5:28
9.	"Video Rhythm Track: Song Two" ("The Finish Line" backing track)	5:25
10.	"Video Rhythm Track: Song Three" ("Jazz Ballad" backing track)	3:23
11.	"Video Rhythm Track: Song Four" ("China" backing track)	4:32
12.	"Video Rhythm Track: Song Five" ("Video Jam" backing track)	2:41
Total length:		56:22

== Personnel ==
- Michael Angelo Batio – guitars, bass, keyboards, drums, percussion, production, engineering, mixing
- Mike Hagler – mastering
- Phil Carlson – artwork, design, layout
- Dan Machnik – photography
