= Colorama (album) =

Studio album by The Flyin' Ryan Brothers
- Released: 1999
- Recorded: 1999 at The Garage, Streamwood, Illinois and Ryan's Roost, La Valle, Wisconsin
- Genre: Progressive rock, instrumental rock
- Length: 65:47
- Label: M.A.C.E.
- Producer: The Flyin' Ryan Brothers

The Flyin' Ryan Brothers chronology
Sibling Revelry (1996)	Colorama (1999)	Legacy (2002)

Colorama is the second album by American progressive rock band The Flyin' Ryan Brothers, released in 1999.

== Track listing ==
CD (2-1028)
No.	Title	Length
1.	"Said and Done"	4:10
2.	"Gotta Get Up"	3:40
3.	"Chordon Bleu'" (instrumental)	4:02
4.	"Flip City"	4:21
5.	"Big Joe's Boogie" (instrumental)	5:11
6.	"What It Is"	4:04
7.	"I Wanna Be a Klingon"	2:12
8.	"Alone Together" (instrumental)	5:19
9.	"Promise of Love"	5:08
10.	"Captain Nemo" (instrumental)	3:53
11.	"Slumberland" (instrumental)	4:00
12.	"Innocent Mind"	5:47
13.	"The Prophet" (instrumental)	1:43
14.	"The Propechy" (instrumental)	6:35
15.	"Guitarmaggedon"	4:41
16.	"Salvation" (instrumental)	0:40
Total length:		65:47

== Personnel ==
- Jimmy Ryan – guitars, vocals, additional instrumentation, production, mixing
- Johnny Ryan – guitars, vocals, additional instrumentation, production, mixing
- Mike Batio – lead guitar on "I Wanna Be a Klingon", "Captain Nemo" and "The Prophecy", mixing
- Tommy Dziallo – rhythm guitar on "Gotta get Up", lead guitar on "The Prophet"
- Jim "Mudpuppy" Wiley – lead vocals on "Flip City"
- Nick Cortese – backing vocals on "Said and Done", "Flip City" and "Innocent Mind", vocals on "Promise of Love"
- Johnny Mrozek – backing vocals on "Said and Done", "Flip City" and "Innocent Mind"
- Mark Richardson – mastering
- John Foss – photography
- Dorothy Kosier – typesetting
- Jim Molick – layout
- Mark Helmke – layout
