= Stephen Quadros =

American television presenter and actor

Personal information
- Born: Stephen Quadros; November 9, 1952 (age 73) Santa Cruz, California, U.S.

Professional wrestling career

Stephen "The Fight Professor" Quadros (born November 9, 1952, in Santa Cruz, California, United States) is an American broadcaster, specializing in play-by-play and color commentary, as well as interviews for the combat sports genre on cable, pay-per-view and DVD. His resume encompasses over 100 international mixed martial arts events since 1997.

A long time martial arts practitioner and devotee, Quadros was the original host and play-by-play commentator for the PRIDE Fighting Championships alongside Bas Rutten (iN Demand PPV, Fox Sports Net, DVD, Japan) and has done play-by-play and color commentary for events such as the International Fight League (Fox Sports Net, USA), Cage Rage (SKY Sports, DVD, England), Hardcore Championship Fighting (BELL ExpressVU, DVD, Canada), World Extreme Cagefighting (HDNet, DVD, USA), K-1 World Grand Prix 2000 (ESPN, DVD, Japan), Rumble on the Rock (iN Demand PPV, USA), Too Hot To Handle (DVD, Netherlands), Kuwait Shidokan Jitsu Warriors War 1 (DVD, Kuwait), APEX Championship Fighting (TSN, DVD, Canada) and King of the Cage (DVD, USA).

From 2007 to 2011, Stephen worked for Showtime Sports (premium cable, USA) where he called the action for Strikeforce, Strikeforce Challengers, as well as ShoXC and EliteXC.

Quadros was reunited with his PRIDE broadcasting partner Bas Rutten as part of the UFC Undisputed 3 video game (PlayStation, Xbox). When the game is played in "PRIDE Mode", Quadros and Rutten provide the commentary duties.

Additionally Quadros was the host, along with San Diego sports radio personality Jeff Dotseth, of Clinch Gear Radio, a mixed martial arts (MMA) related program, that was broadcast weekly on Sirius XM (2010–2012). Clinch Gear Radio was also the voice of mixed martial arts for AFN, American Forces Network.

He was also the host for the 2005 and 2006 Black Belt Hall of Fame Awards at Universal Studios.

Working alongside his longtime Showtime cohort Mauro Ranallo, Quadros served as an analyst-color commentator and interviewer for GLORY World Series on CBS Sports Network, Spike TV, ESPN 2 (2012-2015). GLORY showcased the talents of the world's greatest kickboxers, such as four time K-1 World Grand Prix champion Semmy Schilt, three time K-1 World Grand Prix champion Peter Aerts, three time K-1 World Grand Prix champion Remy Bonjasky and two time K-1 World MAX champion Giorgio Petrosyan.

Quadros also called the action on ShinZo: Fight Sport in Guatemala City, Guatemala with UFC Hall of Famer Stephan Bonnar.

On August 1, 2014, Quadros was inducted into the Masters Hall of Fame for "Outstanding Contributions To The Martial Arts". The award ceremony was held in conjunction with the 50th anniversary of the Long Beach International Karate Championships, Ed Parker's tournament that previously showcased Bruce Lee, Chuck Norris, Joe Lewis, Mike Stone, Benny Urquidez, Bill Wallace and many more. Then on November 16, 2014, Quadros was inducted into the Legends of MMA Hall of Fame along with Art Davie, Big John McCarthy, Pat Miletich, Fedor Emelianenko and Rickson Gracie.

After working practically non-stop for 15 years as a broadcaster-fight commentator, Quadros resumed his acting career in Southern California. He has studied acting with William Alderson, Stella Adler, Milton Justice, Mark Haining (of Peggy Feury's "Loft" studio), Arthur Mendoza, Scott Bernstein's Comedy Plus and Michelle Danner (Larry Moss Studio).

== Music ==
Quadros was the drummer for SNOW (1978–1981), a heavy metal band that included Quiet Riot guitarist Carlos Cavazo. SNOW opened for Iron Butterfly, Quiet Riot and Johnny Winter and headlined musical venues such as The Troubadour, The Starwood, Whisky a Go Go, Pasadena Civic Auditorium and Santa Monica Civic Auditorium. The group independently released its only record in 1980, which included popular SNOW songs "Crack The Whip" and "No Way To Treat A Lady", and received airplay on Southern California radio stations KROQ and KLOS.

Upon the departure of drummer Peter Criss, Gene Simmons spotted Quadros, while he was still a member of SNOW, in "Carmine Appice's 1st Annual Drum-off" video and invited him to audition for Kiss, though Quadros did not land the position.

Quadros also drummed for the Los Angeles-based rock bands Orange (1976–1977) and Dangerface (1982–1983).

In 2004, Quadros appeared as a founding member of Sacred Cowboys, performing with the group at Los Angeles-area clubs such as the Knitting Factory, House of Blues (Hollywood) and the Cat Club. Fronted by W. Earl Brown of the HBO series Deadwood, Sacred Cowboys’ single, "Gear Grinding Daddy", is featured on the soundtrack of Dunsmore, an independent film in which Brown starred.

Quadros is also a member of 7th Sun, along with JT Curtis (lead guitar, vocals), Adam Kury (bass, vocals) and Mike Russeck (keyboards, vocals), who released their debut album "From The Beginning" in 2008 (iTunes, Amazon, Rhapsody). Quadros, Curtis and Kury also compose the trio that is Whipped Cream, a Los Angeles-based Cream tribute band.

Quadros and the Cavazo brothers, Carlos and Tony, have reformed SNOW, along with vocalist Andrew Freeman. The group played its first live gig in over three decades at The Key Club on the Sunset Strip on December 10, 2011.

== Film and television ==
When tendonitis interrupted Quadros’ musical career in the early 1980s, he transitioned into acting, broadcasting and journalism.

Quadros has either starred, guest-starred or co-starred in more than 75 films and TV shows since 1988. His on-screen credits include Dr Caligari (1989), Never Back Down: No Surrender (2016) which was directed by action star Michael Jai White; Demon Wind (1990) as Chuck, The Kung Fu Magician; Cradle 2 the Grave (Jet Li, DMX) (2003); The Last Run (2004); Sworn to Justice (Cynthia Rothrock) (1996); CSI: Miami; Numb3rs; Without a Trace; Pacific Blue; Murder, She Wrote; and Walker, Texas Ranger (versus Chuck Norris). Quadros also played "Angel Martin" alongside Traci Lords in the (1991) movie Shock 'Em Dead. He was in CIA Code Name: Alexa (1993) as Max Mahler, where he went toe-to-toe in a fight scene with O. J. Simpson.

Combining his theatrical training with an extensive martial arts background in Tae Kwon Do, Shotokan, WingTsun, boxing, kickboxing and submission grappling, Quadros also became a Hollywood fight choreographer. He served as fight coordinator for The Perfect Sleep (2006) and Skeleton Man (2004); fight technical advisor for Cradle 2 the Grave and Exit Wounds (Steven Seagal) (2001); and fight choreographer and 2nd unit director for Pit Fighter (2005).

== Journalism ==
Quadros contributed to Bas Rutten's Big Books of Combat and to UFC's Ultimate Warriors: The Top Ten and The Ultimate Martial Arts Q&A Book. He also served as a judge for the Ultimate Fighting Championship 8.

Stephen was the founding editor of Black Belt Presents: FIGHTSPORT with Stephen Quadros (2001–2002), a full-color glossy magazine with newsstand distribution published by Black Belt Magazine. Prior to that, Quadros was a contributing editor/columnist for Black Belt (1998–2001) and Fighters Only (2005–2006), editor-in-chief of Kickboxing Ring Report (1993–1998) and was published in popular combat sport publications such as Inside Kung Fu, Karate/Kung Fu Illustrated, Grappling Magazine and Full Contact Fighter.

Quadros was the host of the eponymously titled Stephen Quadros Show on the Sherdog Radio Network, which debuted on June 12, 2007. It was a weekly, one-hour program that aired live on Tuesdays at 12:00 PM PST, featuring commentary by Quadros and co-host Aaron Crecy, listener calls and interviews. The show featured live segments with mixed martial arts stars such as Dan Henderson, Randy Couture, Quinton Jackson, Renzo Gracie, Frank Shamrock, Ken Shamrock, Bas Rutten, B.J. Penn, Rashad Evans, Matt Lindland, Matt Serra, Ian Freeman and Don Frye. Quadros left Sherdog Radio Network in 2008, citing his schedule could no longer accommodate it.

During Quadros' career as a broadcaster, he has been known for his creative descriptions of fighters and fights, occasionally giving nicknames, or coining terms or phrases. Case is point is "lay and pray," a frequently used mixed martial arts (MMA) term coined by Quadros during the televised broadcast of the PRIDE Fighting Championships event titled "Cold Fury", which was held at the Saitama Super Arena in Japan on December 9, 2000.

The phrase (‘lay and pray’) refers to a situation where a wrestler or grappler keeps another fighter, who is perceived to have the better striking skills, pinned or controlled on the mat to avoid a stand up, boxing, kickboxing or Muay Thai style fight, yet exhibiting little or no urgency to finish the grounded opponent with a knockout or a submission. The inference is that the wrestler/grappler takes the striker down, lies on him to neutralize the opponent's striking weapons, and prays that they don't return to the standing position.

At the PRIDE "Cold Fury" show in 2000, in the 7th fight of the evening, former Japan national Greco-Roman wrestling champion Kazuyuki Fujita faced Dutch Muay Thai stylist Gilbert Yvel, in a classic wrestler versus striker mixed martial arts (MMA) matchup. The result a relatively slow-paced fight that ended in a decision, where Fujita took Yvel to the floor repeatedly and mostly just held him in the downed position, which lead PRIDE play-by-play announcer Stephen Quadros to utter the following passage in the final round during the broadcast:

"There’s ground and pound, that’s when a wrestler, primarily, is on top and throws punches downward. But there’s also Bas (Rutten, Quadros's PRIDE broadcasting partner), can I coin a phrase tonight? Can you call it ‘lay and pray’ that they don’t stand up?"
