= Nitro II: H.W.D.W.S. =

Studio album by Nitro
- Released: March 21, 1992
- Studio: Platinum Post Full Sail Center for Recording Arts (Orlando, Florida)
- Genre: Glam metal; heavy metal
- Length: 39:31
- Label: Rampage
- Producer: Jim Gillette; Gary Platt

Nitro chronology
O.F.R. (1989)	Nitro II: H.W.D.W.S. (1992)	Gunnin' for Glory (1999)

Singles from Nitro II: H.W.D.W.S.
- 1. "Cat Scratch Fever" Released: 1992

Nitro II: H.W.D.W.S. (Hot, Wet, Drippin' with Sweat) is the second and final studio album by American heavy metal band Nitro. It was released on March 21, 1992, by Rampage Records, a division of Rhino Entertainment. The band's cover of Ted Nugent's "Cat Scratch Fever" was issued as the album's only single.

== Background ==
Nitro II: H.W.D.W.S. was recorded at the Platinum Post Full Sail Center for Recording Arts in Orlando, Florida, with Nitro vocalist Jim Gillette leading its production alongside recording and mixing engineer Gary Platt. The album features bassist Ralph Carter and drummer Johnny Thunder, both of whom joined the band after the promotional concert tour for the 1989 album O.F.R. H.W.D.W.S. was the last album Nitro released before breaking up in 1993.

== Track listing ==
All tracks are written by Jim Gillette and Michael Angelo Batio, except where noted

No.	Title	Length
1.	"I Want U" (written by Gillette, Batio and Howie Hubberman)	4:11
2.	"Cat Scratch Fever" (written and originally recorded by Ted Nugent)	3:35
3.	"Crazy Love" (written by Gillette, Batio and Hubberman)	3:42
4.	"Hot, Wet, Drippin' with Sweat"	3:27
5.	"Boyz Will B Boyz"	3:28
6.	"Turnin' Me On"	3:47
7.	"Don't Go"	4:04
8.	"Makin' Love"	4:32
9.	"Take Me"	4:00
10.	"Johnny Died on Christmas"	3:47
11.	"Hey Mike"	0:52

== Personnel ==
- Jim Gillette – vocals, production
- Michael Angelo Batio – guitars, keyboards
- Ralph Carter – bass
- Johnny Thunder – drums
- Gary Platt – co-production, engineering, mixing, programming
- Dan Mockensturm – programming
- Joe Phillips – programming
- Sean Worrell – programming
- Doug Smith – engineering assistance
- Mark Mason – engineering assistance
- Bob Ludwig – mastering
- Geoff Gans – art direction
- Jack White – photography
