= Blue River, Kentucky =

Unincorporated community in Kentucky, United States

- Unincorporated community
- Location within the state of Kentucky Blue River (the United States)
- Coordinates: 37°37′9″N 82°50′38″W
- Country: United States
- State: Kentucky
- County: Floyd
- Elevation: 666 ft (203 m)
- Time zone: UTC-5 (Eastern (EST))
  - Summer (DST): UTC-4 (EST)
- ZIP codes: 41607
- GNIS feature ID: 507534

Blue River is an unincorporated community in Floyd County, Kentucky, United States.

== Geography ==
Blue River is located on Kentucky Route 404, with a northern terminus on Kentucky Route 1210.

== Notable person ==
- Dave Reffett, rock musician.
