= 2 X Again =

Compilation album by Michael Angelo Batio
- Released: November 5, 2007
- Recorded: 2007 at Monster Mix Studio, Gurnee, Illinois and Studio One, Racine, Wisconsin
- Genre: Progressive metal, neoclassical metal, instrumental rock
- Length: 66:11
- Label: M.A.C.E.
- Producer: Michael Angelo Batio

Michael Angelo Batio chronology
| Hands Without Shadows (2005) | 2 X Again (2007) | Hands Without Shadows 2 – Voices (2009) |

2 X Again is a compilation album by American shred guitarist Michael Angelo Batio released on November 5, 2007. It features songs from Batio's first two studio albums – No Boundaries and Planet Gemini – remixed and remastered, with additional drums from Joe Babiak. Also included are two demo tracks from the No Boundaries sessions: "Acoustic" and "Allegory of the Cave".

== Track listing ==
All music is composed by Michael Angelo Batio.

| No. | Title | Original album | Length |
|---|---|---|---|
| 1. | "Intro: The Forest Primeval" | Previously unreleased | 0:21 |
| 2. | "Rain Forest" | No Boundaries (1995) | 6:26 |
| 3. | "2 X Again" | No Boundaries (1995) | 5:32 |
| 4. | "No Boundaries Intro" | Planet Gemini (1997) | 1:15 |
| 5. | "No Boundaries" | No Boundaries (1995) | 3:45 |
| 6. | "Time Traveler" | Planet Gemini (1997) | 6:40 |
| 7. | "Peace" | No Boundaries (1995) | 6:27 |
| 8. | "Acoustic" (demo) | Previously unreleased | 1:10 |
| 9. | "I Do for You" | No Boundaries (1995) | 6:36 |
| 10. | "Science Fiction" | No Boundaries (1995) | 6:32 |
| 11. | "Planet Gemini" | Planet Gemini (1997) | 4:53 |
| 12. | "The Jam Game" | Planet Gemini (1997) | 5:33 |
| 13. | "Outsideinside" | No Boundaries (1995) | 4:33 |
| 14. | "Allegory of the Cave" (demo) | Previously unreleased | 6:28 |

== Personnel ==
- Michael Angelo Batio – electric guitars, acoustic guitars, bass, keyboards, production, engineering
- Joe Babiak – drums
- Chris Djuricic – mixing, drum engineering
- James Murphy – mastering
- Paul Kuhr – design, concept, layout
- Stephen Jensen – photography
