= Demon Wind =

1990 American horror film

- VHS cover
- Directed by: Charles Philip Moore
- Written by: Charles Philip Moore
- Produced by: Michael Bennett; Peter Collins; Sandy Horowitz; Paul Hunt
- Starring: Eric Larson; Francine Lapensée; Rufus Norris; Jack Forcinito; Stephen Quadros; Mark David Fritsche; Sherry Leigh
- Cinematography: Thomas L. Callaway
- Edited by: Christopher Roth
- Music by: Bruce Wallenstein
- Distributed by: Demon Wind Productions Ltd.; United Filmmakers
- Release date: July 20, 1990
- Running time: 96 minutes
- Country: United States
- Language: English
- Budget: $500,000

Demon Wind is a 1990 American horror film directed by Charles Philip Moore. The film concerns a group of friends who travel to an old farm, and soon find they cannot leave as a mysterious fog sets in.

== Synopsis ==
In 1931, a body is burned on a cross. On a farm, a woman named Regina attempts to barricade a door, from where beyond, demons try to enter. Her husband George transforms into a demon instead and kills her.

Sixty years later, after the suicide of his father, a young man named Cory, the grandson of Regina and George, and his girlfriend Elaine, along with a group of their friends, travel up to the farm, so that Cory can figure out what happened to his grandparents. They are attacked by a band of vicious demons. When the kids try to escape, a mysterious fog brings them back to the farm, protected by a shield that prevents the demons from entering the house. One by one, the kids become possessed by the demons, but manage to fight them off with a pair of daggers they find, which is the only thing that will kill them. Eventually only Cory and his girlfriend Elaine remain alive. The two discover that Cory is able to defeat the evil by transforming into a higher being. The battle nearly ends them both, but they are able to win. As they flee and return to civilization a possessed townsperson watches them from the hills, implying that they did not completely defeat the evil.

== Cast ==
- Eric Larson as Cory
- Francine Lapensée as Elaine
- Rufus Norris as Harcourt
- Jack Forcinito as Stacey (credited as Jack Vogel)
- Stephen Quadros as Chuck
- Mark David Fritsche as Jack
- Sherry Leigh as Bonnie (credited as Sherry Bendorf)
- Bobby Johnston as Dell
- Lynn Clark as Terri
- Richard Gabai - Willy
- Mia Ruiz as Reena
- Kym Santelle as Harriet
- Stella Kastner as Grandmother Regina
- Axel Toowey as George
- C.D.J. Koko as Grand Demon (credited as D. Koko)

== Production ==
While Demon Wind was the directorial debut of Charles Philip Moore, Moore had previously gotten some uncredited directing experience serving as a second assistant to director Paul Hunt on Twisted Nightmare. Hunt and producing partner Michael Bennett were impressed enough by Moore to ask if he had any viable concepts for a horror film that would use the same sets and locations from Twisted Nightmare only for the team to find out the price of those locations had increased to the point they were no longer affordable. With no location secured and the start of filming approaching Moore came up with a workaround where instead of having a farmhouse as initially planned, they would instead used the ruins of a farmhouse with only a standing door and explain that the interior of the house still existed by way of magic when going through the door.

Demon Wind was filmed in 1989 in Thousand Oaks, California.

== Release ==
Demon Wind premiered in Germany on July 20, 1990, followed by a VHS release in the United States by Prism Entertainment in conjunction with Paramount Home Video on September 13, 1990. The release featured a 3D lenticular video cover.

In October 2017, Vinegar Syndrome released a 2K restoration of the film on DVD and Blu-ray.

Demon Wind can be watched in its entirety in the video game High on Life, featuring a full-length commentary by Red Letter Media.

=== Reception ===
A writer for the Fort Worth Star-Telegram gave the film a score of one star. Matt Donato reviewed the film for SlashFilm, calling it "an impossibly rewarding, continuous grab bag of genre absurdity that is as flummoxing as it is utterly transcendent". Joe Bob Briggs screened the movie as part of The Last Drive-In on Shudder, calling it "the only haunted house, time-travel, vomit-spewing demon zombie apocalypse, multi-generational satan worship martial arts film."

== Sequel ==
Due to strong sales at Cannes Film Festival, it was reported that Charles Philip Moore was scripting Demon Wind II which had acquired $3 million through pre-sales.
