= Planet Gemini (album) =

Studio album by Michael Angelo Batio
- Released: 1997
- Studio: M.A.C.E. Court Studios (Chicago, Illinois)
- Genre: Heavy metal; instrumental rock; progressive metal; speed metal
- Length: 42:22
- Label: M.A.C.E.
- Producer: Michael Angelo Batio

Michael Angelo Batio chronology
| No Boundaries (1994) | Planet Gemini (1997) | Tradition (1998) |

Planet Gemini is the second solo album by American heavy metal musician Michael Angelo Batio (credited as Angelo). Recorded and self-produced by the guitarist at M.A.C.E. Court Studios in Chicago, Illinois, it was released in 1997 on his own label, M.A.C.E. Music. Batio performs all instruments and vocals on the album, with drummer Chuck White and keyboardist Frank Lucas the only other performers, both on the two parts of "No Boundaries Part II".

== Background ==
Like on his first solo album, 1994's No Boundaries, Michael Angelo Batio recorded Planet Gemini at his own M.A.C.E. Court Studios in Chicago, Illinois; he is credited on the album as performing all electric, acoustic and bass guitars, keyboards, drums and percussion, as well as producing, engineering and mixing. The only other performers on the release are Chuck White and Frank Lucas, who play drums/percussion and keyboards, respectively, on "No Boundaries Part II: Intro" and "The Jam Game". Although mostly instrumental, Planet Gemini is Batio's first solo album to feature vocals, which he performs on "So Much to Live For" and "These Four Walls".

Planet Gemini was originally released on Batio's own label M.A.C.E. Music in 1997. It was later remastered and reissued in 2006, with the previously unreleased instrumental versions of "So Much to Live For" and "These Four Walls" replacing the original tracks, as well as the addition of "Enough Is Enough" from the 2000 album Lucid Intervals and Moments of Clarity. Three songs – "Planet Gemini", "No Boundaries Part II: The Jam Game" and "Time Traveler" – were remixed and remastered, with additional drums by Joe Babiak, for the 2007 release 2 X Again. A tutorial for "Time Traveler" was featured on the instructional video Speed Kills 2010.

== Critical reception ==
A review published by Guitar Nine describes Planet Gemini as "the incredible follow-up to Michael Angelo's No Boundaries CD". In the review, the writer outlines that the album features "a very progressive, hard edged sound from beginning to end", and suggests that "One of the best reasons to get Planet Gemini is the last song 'Time Traveler'. There is a lead solo section that is so outside and fast that it is incomprehensible that a human could even play it!"

== Track listing ==
All tracks are written by Michael Angelo Batio.

| No. | Title | Length |
|---|---|---|
| 1. | "All Systems Go..." | 1:39 |
| 2. | "Planet Gemini" | 4:41 |
| 3. | "Far Reaches of Space" | 4:15 |
| 4. | "Across Our Universe" | 5:13 |
| 5. | "No Boundaries Part II: Intro" | 1:32 |
| 6. | "No Boundaries Part II: The Jam Game" | 7:27 |
| 7. | "To Alpha Sector 2" | 2:21 |
| 8. | "So Much to Live For" | 3:51 |
| 9. | "These Four Walls" | 4:43 |
| 10. | "Time Traveler" | 6:40 |
| Total length: | | 42:22 |

Japanese version bonus tracks
| No. | Title | Length |
|---|---|---|
| 11. | "Show Time" | 5:10 |
| 12. | "Off and Running" | 5:27 |
| Total length: | | 52:59 |

2006 remastered version
| No. | Title | Length |
|---|---|---|
| 1. | "All Systems Go..." | 1:39 |
| 2. | "Planet Gemini" | 4:41 |
| 3. | "Far Reaches of Space" | 4:15 |
| 4. | "Across Our Universe" | 5:13 |
| 5. | "Time Traveler" | 6:46 |
| 6. | "No Boundaries Part 2" | 8:59 |
| 7. | "To Alpha Sector 2" | 2:22 |
| 8. | "So Much to Live For" (instrumental version) | 5:21 |
| 9. | "These Four Walls" (instrumental version) | 4:23 |
| 10. | "Enough Is Enough" | 6:00 |
| Total length: | | 49:39 |

== Personnel ==
- Michael Angelo Batio – guitars, bass, keyboards, drums, percussion, vocals on tracks 8 and 9, production, engineering, mixing
- Chuck White – drums and percussion on tracks 5 and 6
- Frank Lucas – keyboards on tracks 5 and 6
- Rob Ross – drums and percussion on "Enough Is Enough"
- Pat Lilley – mastering
- Watericolor Group – artwork, design
- Dan Machnik – photography
