= Mike Lipe =

Master guitar luthier

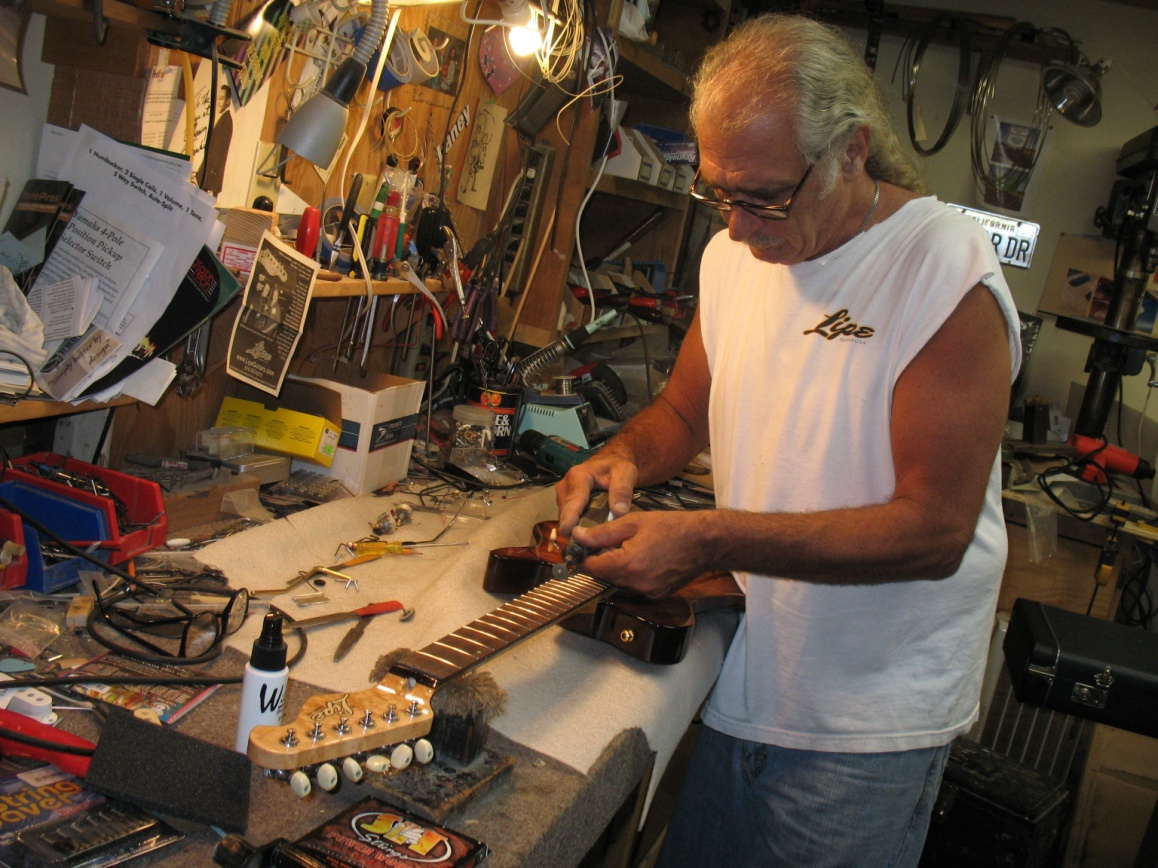
- Born: November 8, 1948; Burbank, California, U.S.
- Died: December 27, 2018 (aged 70); Burbank, California, U.S.
- Occupation: Guitar luthier
- Children: 1
- Website: Official website

Mike Lipe was a master guitar luthier known for his custom electric guitar company, Lipe Guitars U.S.A, based in Los Angeles, California. During a career spanning more than thirty-five years, he constructed guitars for many notable performers, including Brian May, Steve Vai, Joe Satriani, Michael Angelo Batio, and Carlos Santana. According to his business page on Facebook, he passed away in 2019.

Mike Lipe began building guitars in the mid-1970s while working at Killeen Music, a music store in Burbank, California. Eight years later, Lipe left to work for guitar manufacturer Mighty Mite. In 1983, he started his own business and became L.A.'s original Guitar Doctor. After six years of building and customizing guitars for some of the most respected musicians in Los Angeles, Lipe's business was purchased by Ibanez in 1989. While with Ibanez, Lipe was chosen among many other expert luthiers to create a custom guitar shop on the West Coast of the United States, for which he was the master builder of electric guitars for several prominent guitarists such as Joe Satriani and Steve Vai. After leaving Ibanez, Mike began working for Yamaha, where he stayed for two years. Over the next several years, Lipe worked for several prominent guitar manufacturers including Hofner and Fender. During this time, Lipe created and customized guitars for various internationally renowned electric guitarists and bassists.

== Lipe Guitars ==
Mike Lipe was the Owner and Master Luthier of "Lipe Guitars USA" – founded in 2000. Located in Los Angeles County, California.
