= Lucid Intervals and Moments of Clarity Part 2 =

Compilation album by Michael Angelo Batio
- Released: 2004
- Recorded: Monster Mix Studio, Chicago, Illinois
- Genre: Heavy metal, instrumental rock, neoclassical metal
- Length: 69:08
- Label: M.A.C.E.
- Producer: Michael Angelo Batio

Michael Angelo Batio chronology
| Lucid Intervals and Moments of Clarity (2000) | Lucid Intervals and Moments of Clarity Part 2 (2004) | Hands Without Shadows (2005) |

Lucid Intervals and Moments of Clarity Part 2 is the first compilation album by American heavy metal musician Michael Angelo Batio. It contains remastered tracks from Batio's third and fourth studio albums, Tradition (1998) and Lucid Intervals and Moments of Clarity (2000), and was released in 2004 by M.A.C.E. Music. Three songs from Lucid Intervals and Moments of Clarity 2 have also been included on instructional video albums released by Metal Method – "China" on Performance (2006), "Prog" on Speed Kills 3 (2007), and "The Finish Line" on Performance (2006) and Speed Lives 3: The Neo Classical Zone (2009).

== Track listing ==
All tracks are written by Michael Angelo Batio, except "Instant Glamour" by Frank Miceli.

| No. | Title | Original album | Length |
|---|---|---|---|
| 1. | "China" | Tradition (1998) | 4:30 |
| 2. | "The Finish Line" | Tradition (1998) | 5:23 |
| 3. | "Prog" | Tradition (1998) | 5:27 |
| 4. | "Stop Complaining" | Lucid Intervals and Moments of Clarity (2000) | 5:59 |
| 5. | "She Doesn't Live Here Anymore" | Lucid Intervals and Moments of Clarity (2000) | 5:52 |
| 6. | "Lucid Intervals and Moments of Clarity" | Previously "Voices of the Distant Past" Tradition (1998) | 6:04 |
| 7. | "Full Force" | Lucid Intervals and Moments of Clarity (2000) | 4:45 |
| 8. | "Diary of an Empty Life" | Lucid Intervals and Moments of Clarity (2000) | 5:01 |
| 9. | "Prog Revisited" | Tradition (1998) | 4:21 |
| 10. | "East Side Story" | Previously "I Can't Take It No More" Lucid Intervals and Moments of Clarity (2000) | 5:27 |
| 11. | "Instant Glamour" | Lucid Intervals and Moments of Clarity (2000) | 6:25 |
| 12. | "Video Jam" | Tradition (1998) | 3:38 |
| 13. | "Avalanche" | Lucid Intervals and Moments of Clarity (2000) | 4:52 |
| 14. | "Take a Look Around" | Lucid Intervals and Moments of Clarity (2000) | 1:24 |

== Personnel ==
Musicians

- Michael Angelo Batio – guitars, bass, keyboards, drums on tracks 1, 2, 3, 9 and 12, arrangements, programming, production, engineering, mixing
- Rob Ross – drums on tracks 4, 5, 7, 8, 11, 13 and 14, vocals on track 11
- William Kopecky – bass on tracks 4, 5, 8 and 11

Additional personnel

- Mark Richardson – mastering
- Dan Machnik – photography
- Paul Kuhr – graphic design
