= Shred Force 1: The Essential MAB =

Compilation album by Michael Angelo Batio
- Released: April 14, 2015
- Genre: Heavy metal; neoclassical metal; progressive metal; hard rock
- Length: 70:12
- Label: Rat Pak
- Producer: Michael Angelo Batio

Michael Angelo Batio chronology
Intermezzo (2013)	Shred Force 1: The Essential MAB (2015)

Shred Force 1: The Essential MAB is a compilation album by American heavy metal musician Michael Angelo Batio. Released on April 14, 2015, by Rat Pak Records, it is a career retrospective featuring songs from many of Batio's previously released studio albums. Shred Force 1 was produced by Batio and features a wide range of guest musicians. The album registered on several Billboard charts.

== Recording and production ==
Shred Force 1: The Essential MAB features tracks from many of Batio's previously released albums, as well as some previously unreleased tracks and re-recordings. The songs feature numerous musical guests, including vocalist Todd La Torre, guitarists Dave Reffett and Mark Tremonti, bassists Chuck Garric and Rudy Sarzo, and drummer Bobby Rock. Rat Pak Records selected the tracks to include on the collection, of which Batio has said he approved because "a lot of times artists can't even tell what's going to be the hit song". The album was mixed and mastered by Chris Wisco at Belle City Sound in Racine, Wisconsin.

== Promotion and release ==
The release of Shred Force 1: The Essential MAB was first announced in March 2015, described in a press release as a "career retrospective" which "highlights Michael's best work to date". The previously unreleased recording of Rush's "What You're Doing" included on the album was made available for streaming upon its announcement, as was the Intermezzo track "8 Pillars of Steel". Speaking about the release, Batio described it as "the culmination of [his] best musical work". As a promotion for Shred Force 1, Dean Guitars entered customers who pre-ordered the album into a prize draw to win an MAB1 Armored Flame guitar.

== Reception ==
=== Commercial ===
Shred Force 1: The Essential MAB charted on several Billboard charts, reaching number 2 on the Top Heatseekers chart, number 11 on the Hard Rock Albums chart, number 21 on the Independent Albums chart, and number 39 on the Top Rock Albums chart.

=== Critical ===
Media response to Shred Force 1: The Essential MAB was generally positive. Jeb Wright of the website Classic Rock Revisited described the album as "a pure slab of electric guitar mastery" and "a must have for all fans of the shred guitar genre". Target Audience Magazine's Tillman Cooper praised it as "polished, beautiful, [and] awe-inspiring", highlighting the tribute tracks "Slowhand", "Diamond" and "R R R".

== Track listing ==
No.	Title	Writer(s)	Length
1.	"Hands Without Shadows"	Michael Angelo Batio	5:27
2.	"Burn" (Deep Purple cover)	Ritchie Blackmore; Jon Lord; Ian Paice; David Coverdale	5:31
3.	"Juggernaut"	Dave Reffett; Jason Glick	4:38
4.	"What You're Doing" (Rush cover)	Geddy Lee; Alex Lifeson	4:32
5.	"8 Pillars of Steel"	Batio; Marc McNally	9:11
6.	"Call to Arms"	Batio; Roan Reynolds	4:37
7.	"2X Again"	Batio	5:43
8.	"Slow Hand" (tribute to Eric Clapton)	Eric Clapton; Jim Gordon; George Harrison; Jack Bruce; Pete Brown	6:10
9.	"Diamond" (tribute to Dimebag Darrell)	Phil Anselmo; Dimebag Darrell; Rex Brown; Vinnie Paul	5:08
10.	"Rainforest"	Batio	5:25
11.	"Gotta Run"	Tommy Holland; Batio; Joey Cetner; Brad Rohrssen	3:53
12.	"No Boundaries"	Batio	3:50
13.	"R R R" (tribute to Randy Rhoads)	Ozzy Osbourne; Randy Rhoads; Bob Daisley	6:06
Total length:			70:12

Digital edition bonus tracks
No.	Title	Writer(s)	Length
14.	"I Pray the Lord"	Batio	6:14
15.	"Peace"	Batio	6:35
Total length:			83:01

Notes

- "Slow Hand" contains elements of "Layla", "Badge" and "Sunshine of Your Love".
- "Diamond" contains elements of "Cemetery Gates", "This Love" and "Cowboys from Hell".
- "R R R" contains elements of "Crazy Train" and "Mr. Crowley".

== Personnel ==
- Michael Angelo Batio – lead and rhythm guitars, acoustic guitar, bass, keyboards, drums, arrangements, production
- Joe Babiak – drums (tracks 8, 9, 10, 12 and 15)
- William Kopecky – bass (tracks 1, 2, 6 and 11)
- Bobby Rock – drums (tracks 1, 2 and 13)
- Todd La Torre – vocals (tracks 2 and 4)
- Dave Reffett – guitar (tracks 3 and 5)
- Elliott Dean Rubinson – bass (tracks 5 and 9)
- Dan Lenegar – vocals (tracks 6 and 11)
- John Mrozek – drums (tracks 6 and 11)
- Mark Tremonti – guitar (track 2)
- Chris Poland – guitar (track 3)
- Annie Grunwald – guitar (track 3)
- Guthrie Govan – guitar (track 3)
- Michael Romeo – guitar (track 3)
- Michael Lepond – bass (track 3)
- Kurdt Vanderhoof – guitar (track 4)
- Craig Blackwell – guitar (track 4)
- Chuck Garric – bass (track 4)
- Jeff Plate – drums (track 4)
- Jeff Loomis – guitar (track 5)
- Rusty Cooley – guitar (track 5)
- George Lynch – guitar (track 5)
- Andrea Martongelli – guitar (track 5)
- Craig Goldy – guitar (track 5)
- Warren Dunlevy Jr. – vocals (track 8)
- Michael Wilton – guitar (track 9)
- Rudy Sarzo – bass (track 13)
- Chris Wisco – mixing (all tracks except 4), mastering
- Dan Machnik – photography
