= Bill Peck =

American musician

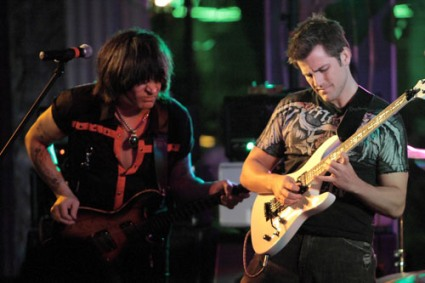

Background information
- Born: April 1, 1979 (age 47); Orlando, Florida U.S.
- Genres: Hard rock, instrumental rock, metal
- Instruments: Guitar
- Years active: 1998–present

William Peck (born April 1, 1979) is a guitarist from Orlando, Florida. Peck is best known for being a close friend with musician Mark Tremonti and for being featured in Guitar One Magazine several times.

== Background ==
Bill Peck released his first instrumental album, 'Internal Flames' in 2000, at the age of 21 years old. He performed and recorded with the band Exit The Ride from 2005-2013. Exit The Ride released their full-length album 'Even the Darkest Light Shines' on Downeast Records in 2019. This album featured his songwriting partnership with vocalist Sam Stone and many memorable guitar solos.

Bill Peck has performed live over 20 times with guitar legend Michael Angelo Batio. Many of these performances were at guitar clinics for Dean Guitars. He also has appeared as a guest soloist on 3 of Michael's albums. Michael's classic album 'Hands Without Shadows' saw Bill's debut on the National Stage with his guest solo on the cover of the Led Zeppelin song 'Rock and Roll'.

Bill appeared as a guest instructor on the nationally recognized DVD 'Mark Tremonti, The Sound and the Story'. This lesson showcased his unique fretboard tapping approach. Concepts including his 8 finger harmonized tapping technique. This involves performing complex legato patterns in harmony with both hands on different strings.

Bill has been named in the top 100 technical guitar players of all time by AI. He recently was ranked #82 of all time.

== Tours ==
He toured nationally in 2001 with Gotti 13 on the 'N Sync Pop Odessey tour and in 2002 with electronica group Prophecy Collective. Peck is sponsored by Dean Guitars, Morley Pedals, and Dean Markley Strings.

Bill Peck performed on the Michael Angelo Batio Hands Without Shadows clinic tour in Orlando, Tampa, Clearwater, Sarasota and several times at the Dean Owners of America annual party.

== Style ==
His signature 8 finger legato harmony technique was first published in Guitar One's September 2006 issue.

Peck has performed with Vinnie Moore as well as performing with Trivium. He also appeared as a guest on Mark Tremonti's guitar instructional DVD The Sound and the Story.

== Appearances ==
Peck appeared on Mark Treomoni's Sound And The Story dvd which was released in 2008. In addition to Peck's giving lessons on the dvd, there were others by Myles Kennedy, Michael Angelo Batio, Troy Stetina, and Rusty Cooley.

Peck appeared on Troy Stetina's 2011 dvd release Troy Stetina: The Sound and the Story which also featured Mark Tremonti, Michael Angelo Batio, and Eric Friedman.

== Discography ==
- Internal Flames (2000) The Orchard
- Hands Without Shadows (2005) M.A.C.E. Music
- Guitar One (Sept. 2006) Lesson DVD
- Even the Darkest Light Shines (2019) Exit The Ride
