= Dave Reffett =

American singer- World Class Music Teacher

- Born: June 6, 1983 (age 43); Blue River, Kentucky, US
- Genres: Heavy metal, speed metal, rock and roll, hard rock
- Occupations: Musician, songwriter
- Instruments: Guitar, vocals, bass guitar
- Years active: 1995–present
- Member of: Shredding The Envelope
- Website: davereffet.com

Dave Reffett (born June 6, 1983) is an American hard rock and heavy metal guitarist, singer, producer, and bassist.

Reffett is best known as the singer, lead guitarist, and producer of the album The Call of the Flames from his project Shredding The Envelope, as well as being a noted player, performer and columnist in the guitar community. His music mixes thrash metal and hard rock with very technical and bluesy guitar playing.

Some of his favorite artists include Kiss, Megadeth, Pantera, Van Halen, Motorhead, Metallica, David Allan Coe, Willie Nelson, Hank Williams Jr, Anthrax, Ronnie James Dio, Judas Priest and Ozzy Osbourne. In an interview with Estonia's Metal Storm, Reffett named Kiss Unplugged by Kiss, And Justice For All by Metallica, Rust in Peace by Megadeth, Holy Diver by Dio, and Powerslave by Iron Maiden as some of his all-time favorite albums.

He is also an in-demand guitar teacher. He gives lessons in person and online via Skype and films teaching products for companies like Guitar World, Dangerous Guitar, and Lecture Land. In 2012, Reffett appeared on the cover of the May issue of Asia's Gitar Plus Magazine and was on the cover again in 2014. 2014 also found Reffett giving clinics all over the world in places like China, Mexico, Chile, and the world-famous Musicians Institute in Hollywood, California. He also appeared on the cover of Mexico's Heavy Riff magazine in 2014.

== Childhood and early life ==
Dave Reffett, the son of a coal miner, grew up in the hills of the Appalachian Mountains in Eastern Kentucky and began playing trumpet, tuba, baritone, and French horn at age 11. At age 13 he was inspired to pick up the guitar after seeing video for Metallica's "The Unforgiven". In 1999 at age 16 he released one album with the short-lived band Graveyard Earth, called Warning Shot. Reffett was forced out of the group after he voiced his distaste of the band's overall direction. Upon leaving Kentucky and moving to Denver, Colorado, Reffett joined the band Moore, playing many live shows but releasing no records with the band. He quit during the recording of what would have been their first album together.

While finishing high school in Denver, Reffett was contemplating taking the Berklee College of Music up on the scholarship they had offered him during a summer program there the previous year. He decided to take advantage of the scholarship after he had a chance meeting with one of his childhood heroes, Megadeth frontman and thrash metal pioneer Dave Mustaine. In 2001 Reffett won a KBPI radio contest to meet Mustaine and asked him if he should take the scholarship or hit the road in a band. Mustaine told him "don't look a gift horse in the mouth, if you've got the chance to do something like that for free go get as many weapons in your arsenal as you can and make your army as tough as it can be".

Reffett took Mustaine's advice and studied hard, eventually earning a degree in Music Business Management from the Berklee College of Music. He then went on to work in the business and legal affairs department at the now defunct Sanctuary Records Group, and at Virgin Records, a division of EMI Music, in the radio promotions and marketing departments. During his time at Virgin Records, Reffett helped market and promote acts as diverse as The Rolling Stones, Korn, Meat Loaf, KT Tunstall, The Red Jumpsuit Apparatus, Janet Jackson and 30 Seconds To Mars.

He got the idea for Shredding The Envelope in 2009. Reffett has been quoted in interviews saying, "I really wanted to make an album that I would be the first in line to buy".

== Style ==
Reffett was a primarily self-taught player from age 13–18, taking very few lessons, but ended up studying music and business at the world-renowned Berklee College of Music in Boston, Massachusetts from 2003 to 2007. He was a recipient of the Berklee World Scholarship Tour award and the Berklee Best award.

He has been noted for his articulate right-hand picking technique and palm muting style. Guitar International Magazine's Matt Warnock wrote about Reffett, "while he can solo with the best of them, what really stands out is his incredible right hand chord work. I have seen and heard a lot of guys speed pick solos over the years at blistering tempos, but few, if any, can match the speed and rhythmic variation that Reffett possesses with his chords."

Reffett is also known for his use of wide vibrato string bending, fretboard tapping, legato articulation, whammy bar dive bombs, artificial harmonics, and chromatic passing tones. He often uses the blues scale, pentatonic scale and harmonic minor scale with many random chromatic passing tones when soloing. In an interview with They Will Rock You, he noted "Tornado of Souls" by Megadeth, "Flying High Again" by Ozzy Osbourne, "Tooth and Nail" by Dokken, and "I Just Don't Want To Say Goodbye" by Shredding The Envelope as some of his all-time favorite guitar solos.

== Recordings ==
=== The Call Of The Flames ===
2009's The Call Of The Flames featured performances from famous musicians George Lynch, Michael Angelo Batio, Chris Poland, Glen Drover, Joe Stump, and Mike Mangini. It featured studio mixing from acclaimed producer Andrew "Mudrock" Murdock (Godsmack, Alice Cooper, Avenged Sevenfold) engineering by Steve Catizone, and was mastered by legendary engineer George Marino (Metallica, Kiss, AC/DC, Guns N' Roses). Producer Joe Clapp (Sully Erna of Godsmack) was the primary engineer during the recording of the album.

In 2010 Bruce Dickinson, the singer of the legendary heavy metal band Iron Maiden, called the album a "must-have" on his BBC radio program Friday Rock Show and called Reffett's guitar playing "fantastic." Nationally syndicated radio show Hard Rock Nights named The Call Of The Flames the #5 album of the year in its "Best Hard Rock of 2010" list.

The album was also in the running for a Grammy nomination during the 53rd annual Grammy Awards voting season in many categories, including "Best Hard Rock Performance" for the song "Caravan of Cannibals" and "Best Metal Performance" for "Devils Roadmap".

In 2015 Michael Angelo Batio released the album Shred Force 1: The Essential MAB via Rat Pak Records, which contained Reffett's composition "Juggernaut". Reffett also appeared on "8 Pillars Of Steel" from the album. Shred Force 1 reached #11 on the Billboard Top Hard Rock Albums chart, #2 on the Heatseekers chart, #121 on the Top Current Albums chart, #39 on the Rock Albums chart, and #21 on the Independent Albums chart.

=== Discography ===
- The Call of the Flames – 2009
- Intermezzo - 2013 - Michael Angelo Batio (Reffett wrote the song "Juggernaut" and performed a guest solo on "8 Pillars Of *Steel")
- Songs Of Future Past - Andrew Bordoni 2013
- Spiral Motion - 2014- Andy Martongelli
- Metal and Thrash Rhythm Guitar: Learn The Secret Techniques of Metal's Greatest Riffmasters - 2014- Guitar World/Alfred Publishing
- Guitar Wizards: Book 1 Versailles Records Compilation
- Shred Force One - 2015 - Michael Angelo Batio - Rat Pak Records (Reffett wrote the song "Juggernaut" and performs a guest solo on "8 Pillars Of Steel")

== Equipment ==
=== Guitars ===
At various stages of his career, Reffett was an artist endorsee of Gibson, Legator and Esoterik Guitars. He is now signed to the Dean Guitars artist roster, and plays their Dean #11 Custom V and 450 Custom from Dean's Graphyte series. He has been seen playing Gibson Flying V's in Guitar World magazine video shoots and has used both Gibson guitars and Esoterik guitars for Guitar World's "lick of the day" iPhone application videos. In the pages of Guitar World he was seen playing a Dean MAB1 Armorflame Michael Angelo Batio signature guitar in the October and November 2010 issues respectively. He has also been seen in Indonesia's Gitar Plus magazine and Poland's Hard Rocker magazine playing a mix of Gibson and Dean guitars. For the recording of "The Call of the Flames", Dave primarily used his Gibson Flying V guitars. For a couple of songs that had whammy bar dive bombs he used a BC Rich Bich, and on the clean intro to "I Just Don't Want To Say Goodbye" he used a Yamaha nylon string classical guitar.

At the 2011 NAMM Show, San Luis Obisbo, California-based company Esoterik guitars unveiled a Dave Reffett signature model guitar known as the DR-1. The guitar featured all of Reffett's favorite specifications such as a Floyd Rose tremolo system and Seymour Duncan Blackout Pickups. It also featured a five-piece walnut neck with figured maple strips, a Honduras mahogany body and ebony overlays, volume knobs and fretboard .

Reffett made headlines on popular heavy metal news sites for his jams with Chris Poland and George Lynch at the 2011 NAMM event. Guitar World Magazine tweeted photos of Reffett performing at the Eminence speakers booth and Premier Guitar magazine filmed Reffett and George Lynch jamming together at the Mr. Scary guitars booth.

=== Pick-ups ===
In Guitar World video appearances Dave can be seen using a Seymour Duncan Dimebag Darrell Abbott signature "Dimebucker" pickup, a personal favorite of his in the bridge position. For the neck position he often uses a Seymour Duncan "59" Model Humbucker. In his Dave Reffett signature model guitar, he had Seymour Duncan blackouts. He now uses DMT (Dean Magnetic Technology) pickups as well as the Duncan Jazz and El Diablo.

=== Effects ===
On Shredding The Envelope, Reffett uses a vintage 1978 Morley Power Fuzz Wah pedal that he has mentioned in many interviews. The pedal is the same model that Cliff Burton used on the first three Metallica albums, Kill 'Em All, Ride the Lightning, and Master of Puppets. He occasionally uses a Crybaby Wah pedal and uses various effects when producing in the studio.

=== Amplification ===
Reffett typically uses a Peavey 6505+ amp head. When recording The Call of the Flames, Reffett ran his amps through a 4x12 Marshall cabinet loaded with Celestion vintage 1930s and Greenbacks in mono and stereo. Now he endorses Eminence speakers and favors their Red Fang, Cannabis Rex and Wizard models. In the studio for some of his rhythm guitar parts he uses a Mesa Boogie dual rectifier amp. On Batio's Intermezzo record, Reffett used an Axe FX II for all of the recording.

=== Microphones ===
For recording vocals Reffett uses a combination of Shure and Manley Gold Reference microphones. For drum recording he uses Blue Ribbon Condenser mics and on his guitar parts he uses a combination of Shure, Sennheiser and Manley mics.

=== Strings ===
Reffett uses D'Addario guitar strings, favoring the .009 to .042 models for soloing and most rhythm guitar parts, while sometimes using thicker gauges for alternate tunings and rhythm. Reffett's favorite acoustic strings are Martin Lifespan SP gauge 0.12 to .054. He has also been known to use Elixir brand strings.

=== Picks ===
Dave uses black and red Dunlop Jazz IIIs and pure titanium Jazz III style picks from Timber Tone. For bass guitar he alternates between using finger style and Jazz III guitar picks.

=== Straps ===
Dave uses a Planet Waves locking strap as well as various Levy straps.
