= Kopecky =

Kopecky are an American progressive rock instrumental band of three brothers, who combine a number of elements including metal, classical, pop, eastern music and fusion together to create a unique sound. Since their inception in 1997, their intense music is characterized by virtuoso musicianship, soaring melodies, and dark-tinged experimentation.

The band members (brothers) are:

- William Kopecky, 4 string fretless and 6 string fretted basses, keyboards, and sitar
- Joe Kopecky, 6 and 7 string electric guitars
- Paul Kopecky (d. June 22, 2009), acoustic and electronic percussion

== Discography ==
- Kopecky (Mellow Records/Italy, Self-released/USA 1999)
- Serpentine Kaleidoscope (Cyclops Records/England 2000)
- Orion A Live Performance (M.A.C.E. Music 2001)
- Sunset Gun (Musea Records 2003)
- Blood (Unicorn Digital 2006)
