= O.F.R. (album) =

Studio album by Nitro
- Released: May 30, 1989
- Studio: Front Page Productions (Costa Mesa, California)
- Genre: Glam metal; heavy metal; speed metal
- Length: 41:01
- Label: Rampage
- Producer: Jim Gillette; Michael Angelo Batio; Charlie Watts; Bob Cahill

Nitro chronology
O.F.R. (1989)	Nitro II: H.W.D.W.S. (1992)

Singles from O.F.R.
- 1. "Freight Train" Released: 1989; 2. "Long Way from Home" Released: 1989

O.F.R. (Out-Fucking-Rageous) is the debut studio album by American heavy metal band Nitro. Recorded at Front Page Productions in Costa Mesa, California, it was produced by the band's vocalist Jim Gillette and guitarist Michael Angelo Batio alongside engineer Charlie Watts and executive producer Bob Cahill. The album was released on May 30, 1989, by Rampage Records, a division of Rhino Entertainment, and peaked at number 140 on the US Billboard 200.

Following the release of his debut solo album Proud to Be Loud the previous year, Gillette formed Nitro in 1988 with Angelo, bassist T. J. Racer (both of whom had performed on the release) and drummer Bobby Rock. All songwriting on O.F.R. is credited solely to Gillette and Angelo, although Racer claims that he also contributed. The album was supported by the release of "Freight Train" and "Long Way from Home" as singles with accompanying music videos.

== Background ==
O.F.R. was recorded at Front Page Productions in Costa Mesa, California, with Nitro vocalist Jim Gillette and guitarist Michael Angelo Batio leading its production alongside engineer Charlie Watts and executive producer Bob Cahill. Gillette and Batio were also credited solely for the album's songwriting, although bassist T. J. Racer has claimed that he contributed to the writing without credit. In a promotional video for the band's third studio album, Gillette and Batio claimed that they had "never been happy with the sound" of O.F.R., blaming the lack of control the band had over the album's direction. The album was supported by two singles and music videos, for the songs "Freight Train" and "Long Way from Home", and promoted on a concert tour for which K. C. Comet replaced departed drummer Bobby Rock.

== Reception ==
O.F.R. was released on May 30, 1989, by Rampage Records, a division of Rhino Entertainment. The album debuted at number 164 on the US Billboard 200 for the week of August 12, 1989, before later peaking at number 140 and spending a total of nine weeks on the chart. AllMusic's Jason Ankeny claimed that the album serves primarily as "a showcase for Gillette's over the top vocal prowess", which he notes is most prominent on "a 32-second scream" and a passage "reaching an amplifier-exploding soprano high D note". Noisecreep's Carlos Ramirez included Gillette in a feature titled "Top 10 High-Pitched Metal Singers", highlighting his "penetrating" and "high-pitched attack" on lead single "Freight Train". "Machine Gunn Eddie" was later featured on the 2009 video game Brütal Legend.

== Track listing ==
All tracks are written by Jim Gillette and Michael Angelo Batio.

No.	Title	Length
1.	"Freight Train"	3:55
2.	"Double Trouble"	3:55
3.	"Machine Gunn Eddie"	6:48
4.	"Long Way from Home"	5:29
5.	"Bring It Down"	3:11
6.	"Nasty Reputation"	4:45
7.	"Fighting Mad"	3:45
8.	"Shot Heard 'Round the World"	4:07
9.	"O.F.R."	5:06

== Personnel ==
- Jim Gillette – vocals, production
- Michael Angelo Batio – guitars, production
- T. J. Racer – bass
- Bobby Rock – drums
- Charlie Watts – co-production, engineering, mixing
- Bob Cahill – co-production
- Geoff Gans – art direction
- The Illusion Factory – package design
- John Dismukes – logo design
- Mark Leivdal – photography
