= Jim Gillette =

American singer

- Also known as: Jimmy Jill
- Born: James Gillette; November 10, 1967 (age 58)
- Origin: Beatrice, Nebraska, U.S.
- Genres: Glam metal, heavy metal, hard rock
- Occupation: Singer
- Years active: 1986–present
- Formerly of: Nitro, Tuff, Organ Donor, Slut
- Spouse: Lita Ford (m. 1994; div. 2011)

James Gillette (born November 10, 1967) is an American singer who was the frontman of the glam metal band Nitro. Originally a member of Tuff, Gillette released a solo album in 1987 and then formed Nitro with guitarist Michael Angelo Batio. They released two albums before breaking up in 1993.

== Biography ==
Gillette began singing as a teen, having been exposed to heavy metal through a local skating rink. His goal was to have a higher range than Rob Halford. He went through extensive opera training and developed his own method. He started his career in Phoenix, Arizona with a band called Slut, singing on their demo tape titled "Perversion for a Price". Gillette heard about a band called Tuff that needed a singer, so he immediately auditioned and then joined the band. Tuff released two demos, "Knock Yourself Out", and "J'lamour Demo". It was during this time that Gillette also dabbled at guitar and harmonica, though he never pursued them seriously, rather working on improving his singing.

Gillette left Tuff to go to Hollywood. At a beach party, he met guitar virtuoso Michael Angelo Batio and they soon formed the band Nitro. They recorded Proud To Be Loud in 1987. Nitro's first live show led to their record deal with Rhino Records.

In 2001, Gillette formed Organ Donor with Chris Campise, James Johnson, and Jesse Mendez. Their first album, The Ultra-Violent, featured Gillette on vocals with guest appearances by Lita Ford, who was then his wife, guitarist Michael Angelo Batio, and David Ezrin. Following the release of The Ultra-Violent in 2001, Gillette left the band. Chris Campise took over on vocals and the band recorded Better Off Dead in 2003.

In 2009, Gillette appeared as a back-up vocalist and producer on Lita Ford's new album, Wicked Wonderland.

== Selected discography ==
=== with Slut ===
- 1986: Demo (EP)
1. "Car Sex" – 1:57
2. "Back to the City" – 2:17
3. "Dolls of Lust" – 2:22
4. "Don't Touch My Hat" – 4:13
5. "Dr. Monster" – 2:23
6. "He's a Whore" – 2:40
7. "Lipstick Lover" – 2:29
8. "Perversion for a Price" – 2:14

Jimmy Jill – Lead Singer Rich Kid – Guitarist Ttam Silver – Bassist Guy Dolly – Drummer

=== with Tuff ===
- 1986: Knock Yourself Out (EP)
1. "Candy Coated" – 2:45
2. "Dressed for Dancing" – 2:41
3. "Forever Yours" – 2:28
4. "Glamour Girls" – 3:38
- 1986: J'lamour Demo (EP)
1. "Bang Bang" – 2:52
2. "Candy Coated" – 2:45
3. "Dressed for Dancing" – 2:41
4. "Forever Yours" – 2:28
5. "Glamour Girls" – 3:38
6. "Ooh Aah" – 2:51

=== Solo ===
- 1987: Proud to Be Loud
1. "When the Clock Strikes 12" – 4:31
2. "Head On" – 4:10
3. "Angel in White" – 4:29
4. "Flash of Lightning" – 5:00
5. "Proud to Be Loud" – 4:40
6. "Never Say Never" – 3:13
7. "Nitro (Guitar Solo)" – 1:31
8. "Red Hot Rocket Ride" – 3:55
9. "Make Me Crazy" – 2:41
10. "Show Down" – 4:02
11. "Mirror Mirror" – 5:33

=== 2003 bonus tracks ===
12. "Bitch on My Back" – 2:54
13. "Organ Donor" – 3:35
14. "Out of Time" – 3:30
15. "Six Feet Deep" – 2:51
16. "Dr. Monster" – 2:22

=== with Nitro ===
- 1988: 1988 Demo Tape
1. "Freight Train" – 4:45
2. "Prisoner of Paradise" – 4:21
3. "Heaven's Just a Heartbeat Away" – 3:59
4. "Nasty Reputation" – 4:36
- 1989: Long Way from Home Single Promo
1. "Long Way from Home LP" – 5:20
2. "Long Way from Home Single" – 3:52
- 1989: Freight Train Single Promo
1. "Freight Train Single" – 3:55
- 1989: O.F.R.
1. "Freight Train" – 3:56
2. "Double Trouble" – 3:59
3. "Machine Gunn Eddie" – 6:44
4. "Long Way from Home" – 5:27
5. "Bring It Down" – 3:10
6. "Nasty Reputation" – 4:44
7. "Fighting Mad" – 3:45
8. "Shot Heard 'Round the World" – 4:07
9. "O.F.R." – 5:06
- 1991: Nitro II: H.W.D.W.S.
1. "I Want U" – 4:11
2. "Cat Scratch Fever" (Ted Nugent) – 3:36
3. "Crazy Love" – 3:42
4. "Hot, Wet, Drippin' with Sweat" – 3:28
5. "Boyz Will B Boyz" – 3:28
6. "Turnin' Me On" – 3:47
7. "Don't Go" – 4:05
8. "Makin' Love" – 4:33
9. "Take Me" – 4:00
10. "Johnny Died on Christmas" – 3:47
11. "Hey Mike" – 0:53
- 1999: Gunnin' for Glory

No.	Title	Writer(s)	Performer	Length
1.	"Freight Train"	Michael Angelo, Jim Gillette	Nitro	3:58
2.	"Shot Heard 'Round the World"	Angelo, Gillette	Nitro	4:05
3.	"Long Way from Home"	Angelo, Gillette	Nitro	4:58
4.	"Prisoner of Paradise"	Angelo, Gillette	Nitro	4:18
8.	"Nasty Reputation"	Angelo, Gillette	Nitro	4:45
9.	"Heaven's Just a Heartbeat Away"	Angelo, Gillette	Nitro	3:55
10.	"Gunnin' for Glory"	Angelo, Gillette	Nitro	3:36

- 2001: Carnivore Soundtrack
1. "Freight Train Demo" – 4:27
- 2003: Hollywood Hairspray Volume 2
1. "B.O.M.B. Also Called (Do You Wanna)" – 3:20

=== with Organ Donor ===
- 2001: The Ultra Violent
1. "Organ Donor" – 3:36
2. "Ultra Violent" – 5:55
3. "Bone Saw" – 3:36
4. "Six Feet Deep" – 2:57
5. "Breathless" – 4:02
6. "Hypnotized" – 4:30
7. "Guilty" – 4:24
8. "Bed Of Nails" – 4:08
9. "Last Rites" – 3:04
10. "My Fist" – 4:12

=== Released music videos ===
1. "Freight Train (1989)" – 3:55
2. "Long Way From Home (1989)" – 5:20
3. "Cat Scratch Fever (1992)" – 3:36

=== Unreleased music videos ===
1. "Boyz Will B Boyz (1993)" – 3:30
