= William Kopecky =

- Also known as: Bill Kopecky
- Origin: Racine, Wisconsin, U.S.
- Genres: progressive rock, progressive metal, Heavy metal
- Instruments: Bass guitar, keyboard, sitar
- Years active: 1999–present
- Labels: Musea, M.A.C.E., Cyclops, Mellow, Unicorn Digital

William Kopecky (born November 17, 1969) is an American musician from Racine, Wisconsin, United States. He currently resides in France and, in 2011, work with Haiku Funeral featured his spoken-word delivery of dark poetry. He is known for playing bass, keyboards and sitar in the band Kopecky with his two brothers, Joe and Paul. He also contributed to numerous progressive rock acts, including Far Corner, Parallel Mind, Pär Lindh Project. Kopecky has put forward that the dark, moody at times oppressive atmosphere of the Yeti Rain project is influenced by storms. The heavy prog rock of Kopecky's Snarling Adjective Convention projects features group improvisation. In a 10-April 2011 interview, Kopecky stated that a new Far Corner album is underway, but may not come out on Cuneiform due to the label's already set release schedule.
