= Michael Angelo Batio =

American guitarist (born 1956)

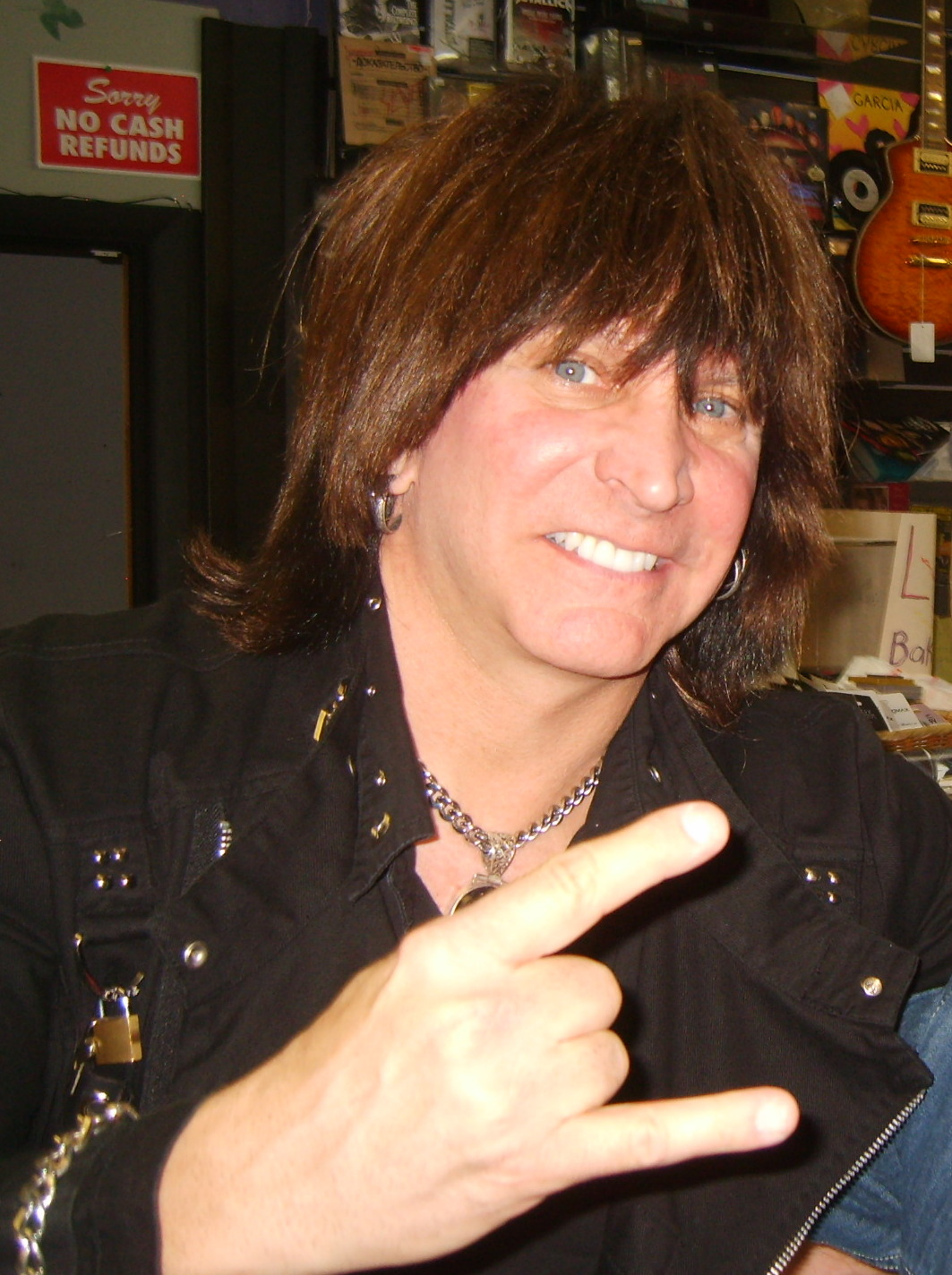
- Batio in 2010

Background information
- Also known as: Mike Batio, MAB
- Born: June 12, 1956 (age 69); Chicago, Illinois, U.S.
- Genres: Instrumental rock; neoclassical metal; heavy metal; glam metal; speed metal; progressive metal
- Occupations: Musician, songwriter, producer, columnist, guitar teacher
- Instrument: Guitar
- Years active: 1984–present
- Label: M.A.C.E.
- Member of: Manowar
- Formerly of: Nitro
- Website: michaelangelobatio.com

Michael Angelo Batio (/ˈbeɪtioʊ/ BAY-tee-oh; born June 12, 1956), also known as Michael Angelo, Mike Batio or MAB, is an American heavy metal guitarist. He was the lead guitarist for the glam metal band Nitro in the late 1980s and early 1990s. He is currently the permanent guitarist for the band Manowar.

He is best known for playing heavy metal and its subgenres such as neoclassical metal and speed metal.

== Biography ==
=== Early life and career ===
Batio was born and raised in Chicago, Illinois, to an Italian father and a German mother. He started playing the piano and composing music at the age of five, and first played guitar at the age of ten. By twelve he was playing in bands in youth clubs, churches, and shows, playing for 10–12 hours on the weekends. He started listening to and watching professionals and sitting down and trying to work out riffs and tunes.

He attended Northeastern Illinois University and achieved a Bachelor of Arts degree in Music Theory and Composition. After he had graduated, Batio looked to become a session guitarist in his hometown. When he asked for a job at a nearby studio, he was given a piece of music and simply asked to play it. He managed to play it adding his own improvisations and fills, making him the studio's primary call-out guitarist.

=== Holland, the Michael Angelo Band and Nitro (1984–1993) ===
Batio began his recording career in 1984 when he joined new Chicago-based heavy metal band Holland, an eponymous project set up by ex-Steppenwolf singer Tommy Holland. With major label Atlantic Records, the band released their debut studio album in 1985 entitled Little Monsters, which saw moderate success in the United States. The band split up soon after, and a compilation of material from the Little Monsters sessions, Wake Up the Neighborhood, was released in 1999 through Batio's label M.A.C.E. Music.

In 1987, after the breakup of Holland, Batio joined glam metal artist Jim Gillette on his solo album "Proud to Be Loud", before founding the band Nitro with bassist T.J. Racer and drummer Bobby Rock. In 1989 Nitro released their first studio album, O.F.R., from which they released two singles, "Freight Train" and "Long Way From Home". The music video for "Freight Train", which received much airplay on MTV, was notable for featuring Batio playing his now famous 'Quad Guitar', a notion which FHM magazine voted one of the "50 most outrageous moments in rock history".

=== Solo career (1993–present) ===
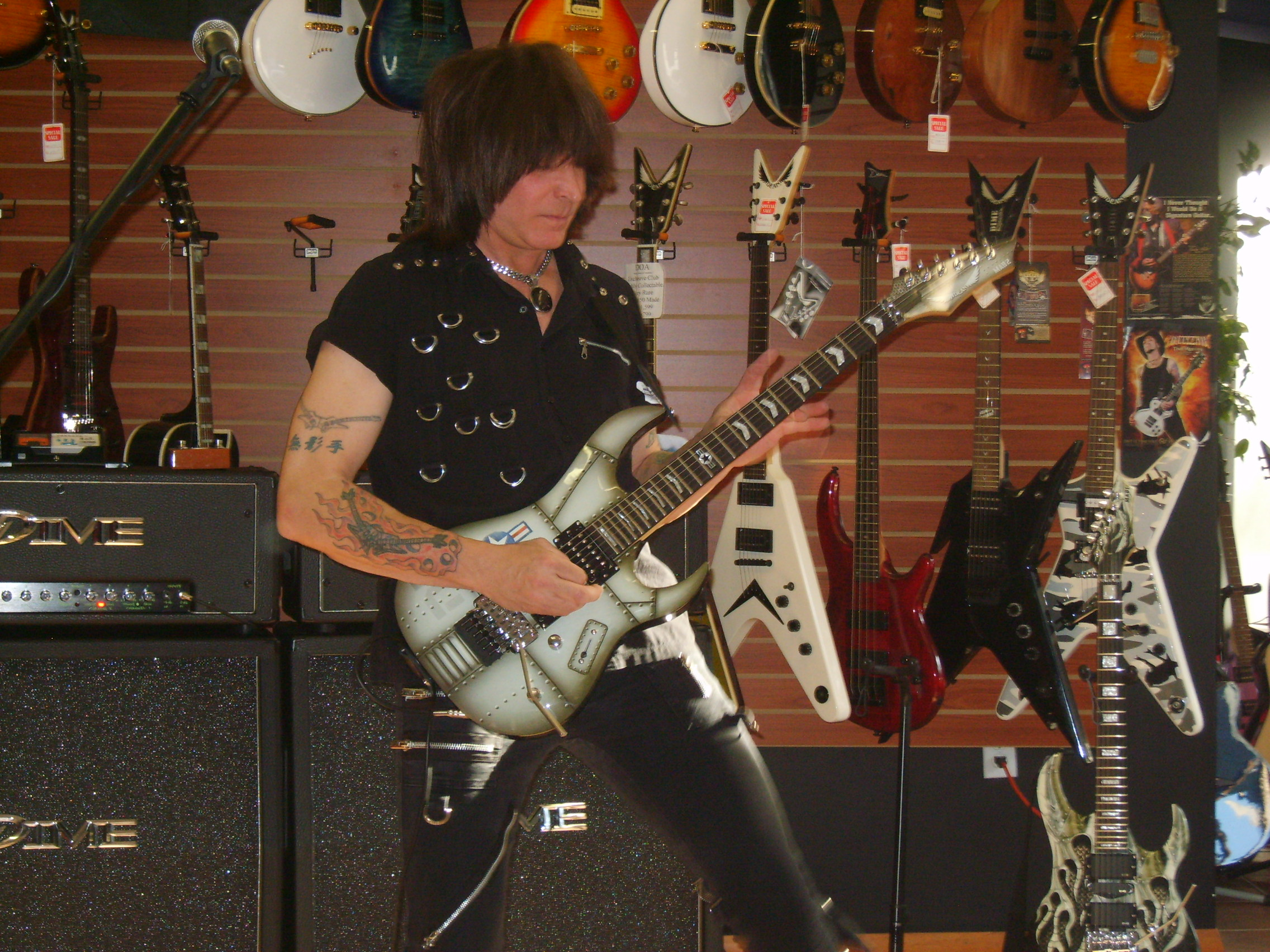
Batio in 2010

In April 1993, Batio founded his own record label, M.A.C.E. Music, which became one of the first labels online in 1996. He used this label when he began recording his first album, No Boundaries, which he released in 1995. Batio's second studio release was Planet Gemini in 1997, which showed a very progressive, experimental side to his playing. In 1999, Batio released his second instructional video, Jam With Angelo, which came with his third studio album as a companion CD: Tradition. This was quickly followed by a fourth full-length album in 2000, Lucid Intervals and Moments of Clarity, which was credited to "Mike Batio and Rob Ross", the latter being the drummer.

In 2001, Batio released a CD with his band "C4," covering songs from his Holland years and including the original "Call to Arms." It was his 1st all vocal CD since recording with Nitro. Batio and C4 were featured on "Rock My Ass", a TV show self-described as "Chicago's live music venue from your couch". This was not Batio's first appearance on the show, having also appeared in 1999 with a band called No Remorse.

In 2004, Batio released a compilation album, Lucid Intervals and Moments of Clarity Part 2.

In 2005, Batio released Hands Without Shadows, which featured guest appearances from such musicians as Mark Tremonti, Rudy Sarzo and Bill Peck.

On September 2, 2022, Manowar announced that Batio will join the band for their 2023 world tour.

=== Film appearance ===
In 1991, Batio's guitar work appeared in the low budget horror film Shock 'Em Dead.

== Style ==
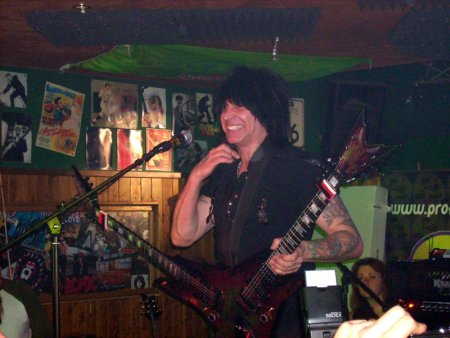
Michael Angelo Batio

Batio was voted the "No. 1 Fastest Guitar Shredder of All Time" by Guitar One Magazine in 2003.

He is ambidextrous.

== Equipment ==
=== Guitars ===
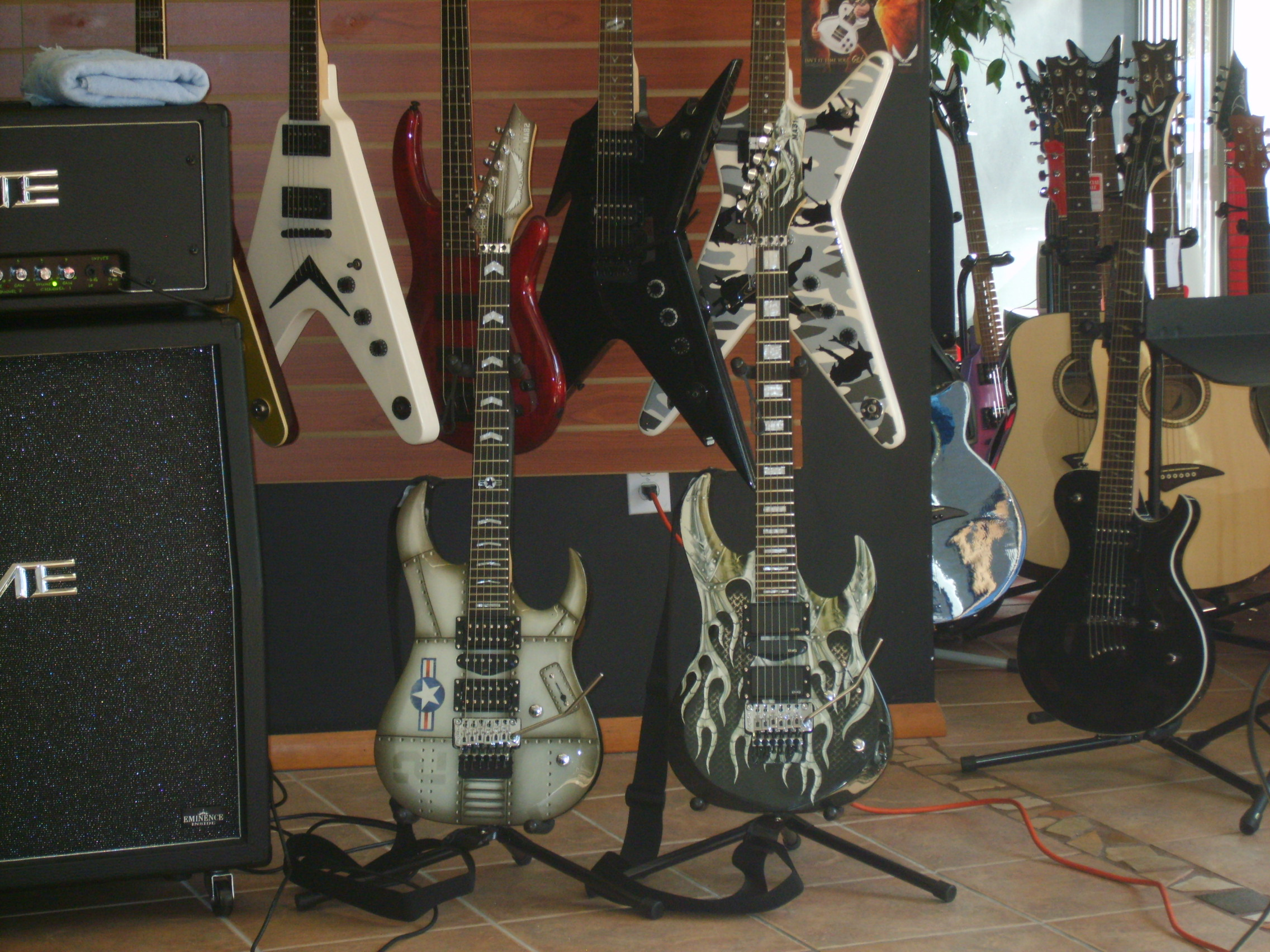
Two of Batio's signature guitars: The MAB 2 Aviator, and the MAB 1 Armorflame

Batio has an extensive collection of around 170 guitars, which he has accumulated since the 1980s. Among his instruments are a Dave Bunker "Touch guitar" (double neck with both bass and guitar, similar to the Chapman Stick), a 1986 Fender Stratocaster 1962 re-issue and several other vintage and custom-built guitars. Among his custom-made guitars is a 29-fret guitar made of military-grade aluminum, which makes the guitar very light. For live performances Batio is an exclusive user of Dean Guitars, both electric and acoustic. In 2007 he designed and developed a signature guitar with Dean, known as the MAB1 Armor Flame.

Earlier in his career when he was first endorsed by Dean guitars, he also supported Dean's campaign for DiMarzio pickups and used DiMarzios in his guitars. These include the DiMarzio PAF, Super Distortion (sometimes using the Super Distortion both in the neck and bridge position, as he did in his Gibson Charvel Circuit Board double guitar. This was the main setup during the recording of No Boundaries). Batio has also used pickups of other brands including Seymour Duncan, namely the Pearly Gates and JB models and also Bill Lawrence pickups. Currently other than using EMGs in his signature guitar he also has a collection of the other brand pickups in his Dean limited edition collectors' models, such as DiMarzio Custom Super Distortions (based on the Super 2 and Super Distortion) in his USA Dean Time capsule Blue Burst ML and the Seymour Duncan pair he used (refer to above) in his USA Dean Collectors edition Hardtail.

==== Double Guitar ====
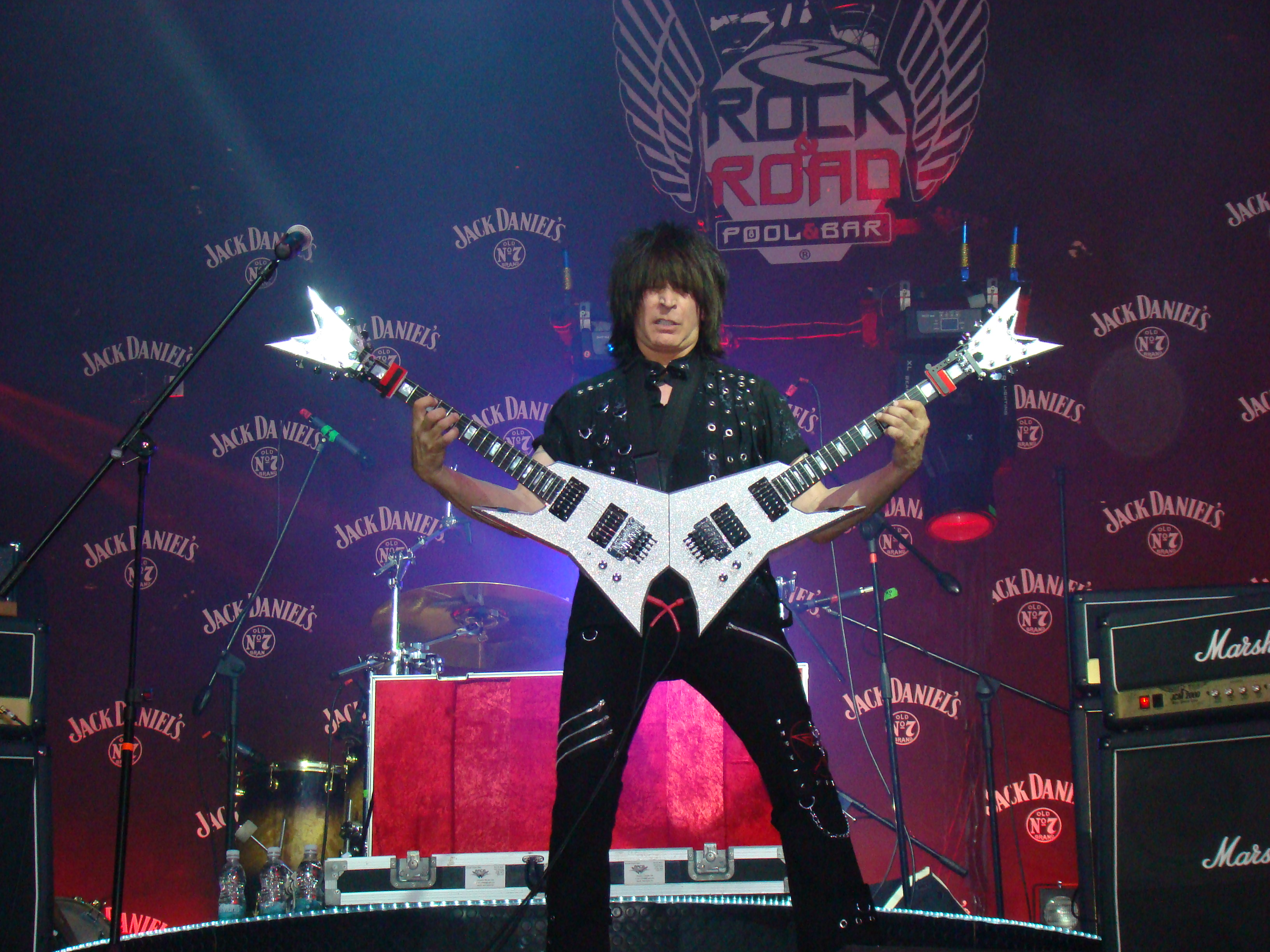
Batio with his double guitar

Batio plays a Double Guitar, a V-shaped, twin-neck guitar which can be played both right- and left-handed. The first version of this instrument was actually two separate guitars simply played together, as opposed to being one entity. A Flying V was fastened to a snare drum in a left-handed position, while another one was strapped around his shoulder. The next version of the guitar, as designed by Batio and guitar technician Kenny Breit, featured a flight case latch attached to the back of each guitar, which could reportedly be assembled in five seconds. By far his most famous and definitely his most photographed double guitar is his USA Dean Mach 7 Jet Double Guitar along with its custom Anvil flight case. One of his inspirations for the radical design was jazz saxophonist Rahsaan Roland Kirk, who was known for playing two or three instruments simultaneously. Batio saw Kirk in concert during his teens, and said the jazz musician "blew his mind."

When the Double Guitar was first used in concert, Batio noticed that the guitars created a lot of feedback when played together. He decided that he needed to invent a way to dampen the strings when both guitars were played at the same time, hence the invention of the "MAB String Dampener", which is now available to buy from M.A.C.E. Music.

The Double Guitar was named as the 8th "coolest guitar in rock" by online music magazine Gigwise.

==== Quad Guitar ====
As well as the Double Guitar, Michael Angelo also invented and designed the Quad Guitar. The guitar was originally built in conjunction with Gibson, and built by Wayne Charvel in California. The top two guitars have seven strings, while the bottom two have the regular six. The first Quad, as used in the video for Nitro's "Freight Train", was stolen in El Paso, Texas, after the second show of Nitro's O.F.R. tour. When Batio was performing in November 2004, a young fan named Simon Jones and his father turned up with a guitar case which held inside the two top guitars of the Quad, as found by Mick Seymour. Dean designed and had Mike Lipe build a new Quad Guitar in 2008.

The Quad Guitar was recently named as the second-"coolest guitar in rock" by online music magazine Gigwise.

Some of the mentioned guitars appears on Rob Scallon's video with Michael Angelo Batio on his Youtube Channel.

== Discography ==
=== Studio albums ===
List of studio albums
Title	Album details
No Boundaries (credited to Michael Angelo)	Released: April 1994; Label: M.A.C.E.; Formats: CD, cassette
Planet Gemini (credited to Angelo)	Released: 1997; Label: M.A.C.E.; Format: CD
Tradition (credited to Michael Angelo)	Released: 2000; Label: M.A.C.E.; Format: CD
Lucid Intervals and Moments of Clarity (credited to Mike Batio & Rob Ross)	Released: August 2000; Label: M.A.C.E.; Format: CD
Call to Arms (credited to C4 featuring Michael Angel)	Released: March 2001; Label: M.A.C.E.; Format: CD
Holiday Strings (credited to Michael Angelo)	Released: November 2001; Label: M.A.C.E.; Format: CD
Hands Without Shadows	Released: October 27, 2005; Label: M.A.C.E.; Formats: CD, digital
Hands Without Shadows 2 – Voices	Released: September 8, 2009; Label: M.A.C.E.; Formats: CD, digital
Intermezzo	Released: November 14, 2013; Label: M.A.C.E.; Formats: CD, digital
Soul in Sight (credited to Michael Angelo Batio and Black Hornets)	Released: January 16, 2016; Label: M.A.C.E.; Formats: CD, digital
More Machine Than Man	Released: June 12, 2020; Label: Rat Pak; Formats: CD, LP, digital

=== Compilations ===
List of compilation albums
Title	Album details
Lucid Intervals and Moments of Clarity Part 2	Released: 2004; Label: M.A.C.E.; Format: CD
2 X Again	Released: November 5, 2007; Label: M.A.C.E.; Formats: CD, digital
Shred Force 1: The Essential MAB	Released: April 14, 2015; Label: Rat Pak; Formats: CD, digital

=== Singles ===
==== As lead artist ====
List of singles as lead artist, showing year released and album name
Title	Year	Album
"The Badlands"	2020	More Machine Than Man
"More Machine Than Man"	2020	More Machine Than Man
"Unbroken" (with Vinnie Moore, Andy James and Cait Devin)	2020	non-album singles
"Hurt"	2022	non-album singles
"No Boundaries" (live)	2022	non-album singles
"Idiot" (featuring the Schneider Ross Band)	2022	non-album singles
"White Room/Layla" (featuring the Schneider Ross Band)	2022	non-album singles
"Freight Train" (acoustic version)	2023	non-album singles

==== As featured artist ====
List of singles as featured artist, showing year released and album name
Title	Year	Album
"Meet the Master" (with Tobias Hurwitz and Dave Martone)	2011	non-album singles
"Foxy Lady" (with Aeraco)	2018	non-album singles
"Hayabusa" (with Paco Ventura and Stuart Hamm)	2019	Madre Tierra
"Spoils of War" (with Savage Bliss, Michael Fath and Michael Troy)	2020	non-album singles
"Instant Glamour" (with the Schneider Ross Band and Jamie Rose Schneider)	2020	non-album singles
"Little Wing" (with the Schneider Ross Band)	2021	non-album singles
"Read It and Weep" (with Freeze)	2021	non-album singles
"Superstition" (with Jamie Rose Schneider)	2021	non-album singles
"Pharaoh's Canticle" (with AM Dandy, Charlie Parra del Riego and Joe Stump)	2021	non-album singles
"IV: Death" (with Anthony Carty)	2022	IV Horsemen
"Fingers of Fury" (with McRocklin & Hutch)	2022	Press Start
"Badge" (with the Schneider Ross Band)	2022	non-album singles
"After the End of Art" (with Carlos Lobo)	2022	non-album singles
"Forgotten" (with Sinful Betty's Band)	2023	non-album singles
"Pulsar" (with Charlie Parra del Riego)	2023	non-album singles
"In My Sleep" (with the Schneider Ross Band)	2024	non-album singles

=== Other appearances ===
List of other appearances, showing year released, other artist(s) and album name
Title	Year	Other artist(s)	Album
"The Haunted House"	1982	none	Mister Varney Presents U.S. Metal: Unsung Guitar Heroes, Vol. II
	2011	Troy Stetina, Mark Tremonti, Bill Peck, Eric Friedman	Troy Stetina: The Sound and the Story
"Power Exalted"	2012	Monkeysoop	Experimetal II
"Scream at the Stars"	2012	Sylencer, Roland Grapow	A Lethal Dose of Truth
"Star X Speed"	2013	Jacky Vincent	Star X Speed Story
"Southern Cross"	2014	Michael Cerna	Starbound
"Bad Breath"	2015	Mr. Fastfinger	Spirit Rising
"The Guitar Battle for Peace"	2015	Christian Russo, William Stravato	The Guitar Battle for Peace
"Simple but Effective"	2015	Christian Russo, Carlo Fimiani, William Stravato, Patrick Abbate	The Guitar Battle for Peace
"Phantomania"	2017	Dark Trilogy	Invictus
"Eruption"	2018	none	Deep Cuts & Rarities
"It Came from Outer Space"	2019	Andrew Bordoni	Andrew Bordoni
"Shredding of the Cosmos"	2021	The Beast of Nod, Matias Quiroz, Sanjay Kumar	Multiversal
"Avalanche"	2022	Rob Silverman, Casey Grillo, John Spinelli, Michael Silverman, Larry Kornfeld	Drumology, Vol. II
