= M.A.C.E. Music =

- Founded: April 1993
- Founder: Michael Angelo Batio
- Genre: Heavy metal Progressive metal Instrumental rock Neo-classical metal
- Country of origin: United States
- Location: Gurnee, Illinois

M.A.C.E. Music, Inc. is an American record label founded by Michael Angelo Batio in April 1993. Currently based in Gurnee, Illinois, the label's main job is that of selling material and merchandise of Batio's, including his albums, videos and accessories such as the "MAB String Dampener". The label also releases material by other artists, including Batio's side-project C4, T. D. Clark, Tom Kopyto and The Flyin' Ryan Brothers. M.A.C.E. distributes material both directly and through other labels, to over 40 countries worldwide including the United States, the United Kingdom, all throughout Europe, Canada, Japan, Qatar, South Africa, Australia, Mexico and Brazil.

M.A.C.E. has its own recording studio in Gurnee called Monster Mix, which has been the location of the recording of some of the later Batio material, most notably Lucid Intervals and Moments of Clarity Part 2 and 2 X Again.

== Artists and releases ==
- C4
  - 108: Call to Arms
- The Flyin' Ryan Brothers
  - 261: Sibling Revelry
  - 262: Colorama
  - 264: The Chaos Sampler
  - 265: Legacy
- Francesco Fareri
  - 281: Suspension
- Holland
  - Wake Up the Neighbourhood
- Jimmy Ryan
  - 263: Finally
- Katrina Johansson
  - Guitarsongs Volume 1
- Kiloton
  - 243: The Seeds of Genocide
  - 244: Knock the Box
- Kopecky
  - 222: Serpentine Kaleidoscope
  - 223: Orion
- Lyden Moon
  - 202: Supersonic Musical Voyage
  - 203: In the Groove
  - 204: Fire It Up
- Michael Angelo Batio
  - 101: No Boundaries
  - 102: Planet Gemini
  - 103: Lucid Intervals and Moments of Clarity Part 2
  - 109: Holiday Strings
  - 110: Hands Without Shadows
  - 111: 2 X Again
  - 601: Performance
  - 602: 25 Jazz Progressions
  - 603: MAB Jam Session
  - 701: Speed Kills
  - 702: Speed Lives
  - 703: Speed Kills 2
  - 704: Speed Kills 3
- Michael Fath
  - 301: Sonic Tapestries
  - 302: Suspended Animation
  - 303: Baptism By Desire
  - 304: Shake
  - 305: Country Squire
  - 306: Flick of the Wrist
  - 307: Profile
  - 308: Songs for Marie
  - 309: The Early Years
  - 310: Yesterday's Child
- Nitro
  - 107: Gunnin' for Glory
- Richard Jessee Project
  - 282: INTRO-P
  - 283: Ostinato
- Ross Butterfield
  - 241: A Major Nuisance
  - 242: Post Traumatic Shred Disorder
- T.D. Clark
  - 251: Personalities
  - 252: Perspective
- The Tobias Hurwitz Band
  - 291: Zen Shred Zone
- Tom Kopyto
  - 272: YTK

== See also ==
- List of record labels
