= Pantera discography =

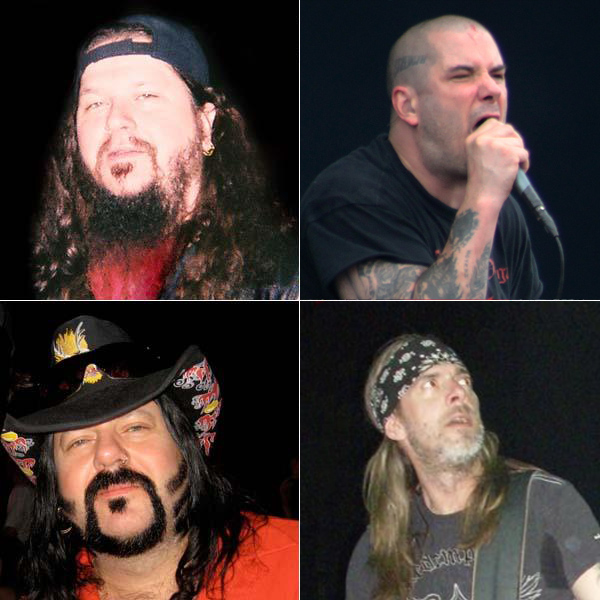
- Top left: Dimebag Darrell, top right: Phil Anselmo, bottom left: Vinnie Paul, bottom right: Rex Brown
- Studio albums: 9
- Extended plays: 4
- Live albums: 2
- Compilation albums: 4
- Singles: 12
- Promotional singles: 11
- Video albums: 4
- Music videos: 18

The following is the discography of Pantera, an American heavy metal band. Pantera formed in the early 1980s and released four studio albums in their early years through their own record label, Metal Magic Records. The band's major-label debut, Cowboys from Hell (1990), peaked at number 27 on the Billboard Heatseekers chart in the United States, and was certified platinum by the Recording Industry Association of America (RIAA). The following year, Cowboys from Hell: The Videos was released; it included video clips produced for Cowboys from Hell. The video was certified gold by the RIAA.

Pantera's second major-label album, Vulgar Display of Power (1992), reached number 44 on the Billboard 200, and was later certified platinum by the Australian Recording Industry Association and the RIAA. Vulgar Display of Power produced two singles, "Mouth for War" and "Walk"; both songs have accompanying music videos included on 1993's Vulgar Video. This video was certified platinum by the RIAA. After touring for two years, the group released Far Beyond Driven (1994), which debuted at #1 on the US Billboard 200 and Australian ARIA charts, reached the top five in Sweden and the United Kingdom, and was certified platinum in Canada and the U.S. The album produced three singles: "5 Minutes Alone", "I'm Broken", and the Black Sabbath cover, "Planet Caravan"; which reached the top 30 in the U.S. Mainstream Rock Tracks and UK singles chart. The Great Southern Trendkill (1996) peaked at numbers two and four on the US Billboard 200 and Australian ARIA charts respectively, and reached the top five on the Finland YLE lista and New Zealand RIANZ charts.

Official Live: 101 Proof (1997) reached the top 20 in four countries, and was certified gold by the RIAA. Later that year, the band issued 3 Watch It Go, which features music videos for all singles of Far Beyond Driven, and another for the song "Drag the Waters" from The Great Southern Trendkill. It was certified platinum by the RIAA. 3 Vulgar Videos from Hell (1999) combines the band's previous home videos into a DVD. It was certified platinum in the US and Australia. Pantera's final studio album, Reinventing the Steel (2000), became their second release to peak at numbers two and four on the US Billboard 200 and Australian ARIA charts, respectively. The best-of album Far Beyond the Great Southern Cowboys' Vulgar Hits! , which combined the titles of the band's four major-label albums, was released in the US on September 23, 2003. Although it only reached number 38 on the Billboard 200, the album was certified platinum by the RIAA. The international version of the compilation features a different track list; both albums include a bonus DVD with their music videos. Later in that year, Pantera broke up, and members Vinnie Paul and Dimebag Darrell subsequently formed the group Damageplan.

== Albums ==
=== Studio albums ===
List of albums, with selected chart positions
Title	Details	Peak chart positions										Sales	Certifications
Title	Details	US	AUS	AUT	FIN	GER	JPN	NZ	NOR	SWE	UK	Sales	Certifications
Metal Magic	Released: June 10, 1983; Label: Metal Magic; Formats: LP, CS	—	—	—	—	—	—	—	—	—	—	US: 5,000+	
Projects in the Jungle	Released: July 27, 1984; Label: Metal Magic; Formats: LP, CS	—	—	—	—	—	—	—	—	—	—	US: 15,000+	
I Am the Night	Released: August 16, 1985; Label: Metal Magic; Formats: LP, CS	—	—	—	—	—	—	—	—	—	—	US: 25,000+	
Power Metal	Released: June 24, 1988; Label: Metal Magic; Formats: CD, LP, CS	—	—	—	—	—	—	—	—	—	—	US: 30,000+	
Cowboys from Hell	Released: July 24, 1990; Label: Atco; Formats: CD, LP, CS	117 (Note: Cowboys from Hell charted in the US upon the 20th anniversary reissue in 2010.)	—	29 (Note: Cowboys from Hell charted in Austria upon the 20th anniversary reissue in 2010.)	—	—	—	—	81 (Note: Cowboys from Hell charted in Norway upon the 20th anniversary reissue in 2010.)	46	—	US: 1,280,000 (Note: United States sales figures for Cowboys from Hell as of February 2002. This does not include copies sold before Nielsen SoundScan began tracking sales data on May 25, 1991.)	RIAA: 2× Platinum; ARIA: Gold; BPI: Gold; RIAJ: Gold
Vulgar Display of Power	Released: February 25, 1992; Label: Atco; Formats: CD, LP, CS	44	56	12 (Note: Vulgar Display of Power charted in Austria upon the 20th anniversary reissue in 2012.)	5 (Note: Vulgar Display of Power charted in Finland upon the 20th anniversary reissue in 2012.)	69	54	71 (Note: Vulgar Display of Power charted in New Zealand upon the 20th anniversary reissue in 2012.)	21 (Note: Vulgar Display of Power charted in Norway upon the 20th anniversary reissue in 2012.)	65 (Note: Vulgar Display of Power charted in Sweden upon the 20th anniversary reissue in 2012.)	64	US: 2,350,000	RIAA: 2× Platinum; ARIA: Platinum; BPI: Gold; MC: Gold; RIAJ: Gold; RMNZ: Gold
Far Beyond Driven	Released: March 22, 1994; Label: East West, Atlantic; Formats: CD, LP, CS	1	1	8	15	7	8	14	14	2	3	US: 1,530,000	RIAA: Platinum; ARIA: Platinum; BPI: Gold; MC: Platinum; RIAJ: Gold
The Great Southern Trendkill	Released: May 7, 1996; Label: Elektra, East West; Formats: CD, LP, CS	4	2	14	4	29	43	5	14	7	17	US: 754,000	RIAA: Platinum; ARIA: Gold; BPI: Silver
Reinventing the Steel	Released: March 21, 2000; Label: Elektra, East West; Formats: CD, LP, CS	4	2	26	3	18	40	10	14	27	33	US: 593,000	RIAA: Gold
"—" denotes a recording that did not chart or was not released in that territory.

=== Live albums ===
List of live albums, with selected chart positions
Title	Details	Peak chart positions										Sales	Certifications
Title	Details	US	AUS	AUT	FIN	GER	JPN	NZ	NOR	SWE	UK	Sales	Certifications
Official Live: 101 Proof	Released: July 29, 1997; Label: East West; Formats: CD, 2LP, CS	15	19	46	16	84	66	19	36	32	54	US: 565,978	RIAA: Gold; ARIA: Gold; BPI: Silver
Far Beyond Bootleg: Live from Donington '94	Released: June 2, 2014; Label: Rhino/East West; Formats: LP, DL	—	—	—	—	—	—	—	—	—	—		
"—" denotes a recording that did not chart or was not released in that territory.

=== Compilation albums ===
List of compilation albums, with selected chart positions
Title	Details	Peak chart positions			Certifications
Title	Details	US	AUS	UK	Certifications
Driven Downunder Tour '94	Released: 1994; Label: WEA; Format: 3CD	—	—	—	
The Singles 1991–1996	Released: 1996; Label: WEA; Format: 6CD	—	40	—	
The Best of Pantera: Far Beyond the Great Southern Cowboys' Vulgar Hits!	Released: September 23, 2003; Label: Rhino; Formats: CD, CD+DVD	38	—	116	RIAA: Platinum; BPI: Gold
1990–2000: A Decade of Domination	Released: March 30, 2010; Label: Rhino; Formats: CD, 2LP, DL	—	—	—	
History of Hostility	Released: October 30, 2015; Label: Rhino; Formats: CD, LP, DL	—	—	—	
"—" denotes a recording that did not chart or was not released in that territory.

=== Video albums ===
List of video albums
Title	Album details	Certifications
Cowboys from Hell: The Videos	Released: April 2, 1991; Label: Atlantic; Format: VHS	RIAA: Gold
Vulgar Video	Released: November 16, 1993; Label: Atlantic; Format: VHS	RIAA: Platinum
3 Watch It Go	Released: November 11, 1997; Label: Elektra; Formats: VHS, VCD	RIAA: Platinum; ARIA: Gold
3 Vulgar Videos from Hell	Released: November 23, 1999; Label: Elektra; Format: DVD	RIAA: Platinum; ARIA: Platinum

== Extended plays ==
List of extended plays
Title	Details
Walk	Released: 1993; Label: Atco; Format: CD
Alive and Hostile E.P.	Released: 1994; Label: Elektra; Format: CD
Hostile Moments	Released: 1994; Label: Atco; Format: 12" vinyl
Rhino Hi-Five: Pantera	Released: 2006; Label: Rhino; Format: DL

== Singles ==
List of singles, with selected chart positions and certifications
Title	Year	Peak chart positions					Certifications	Album
Title	Year	US Active Rock	US Main.	AUS	SWE	UK	Certifications	Album
"Cowboys from Hell"	1990	—	—	—	—	—	RMNZ: Gold; BPI: Silver	Cowboys from Hell
"Psycho Holiday"	1990	—	—	—	—	—		Cowboys from Hell
"Mouth for War"	1992	—	—	—	—	73		Vulgar Display of Power
"Walk"	1993	—	—	—	—	35	RMNZ: Platinum	Vulgar Display of Power
"I'm Broken"	1994	—	—	49	32	19	RMNZ: Gold	Far Beyond Driven
"Planet Caravan"	1994	—	21	90	—	26		Far Beyond Driven
"5 Minutes Alone"	1994	—	—	76	—	—		Far Beyond Driven
"Drag the Waters"	1996	—	—	—	—	—		The Great Southern Trendkill
"Revolution Is My Name"	2000	20	28	—	—	—		Reinventing the Steel
"Hole in the Sky" (Note: "Hole in the Sky" was issued as a promotional single in early 1999 but did not appear on any releases until 2000.)	2000	39	—	—	—	—		Non-album single
"Piss" (Note: "Piss" only appeared on the 20th anniversary edition of Vulgar Display of Power in 2012.)	2012	21	23	—	—	—		Vulgar Display of Power
"—" denotes a recording that did not chart or was not released in that territory.

=== Promotional singles ===
List of promotional singles, with selected chart positions and certifications
Title	Year	Peak chart positions					Certifications	Album
Title	Year	US Active Rock	US Main.	AUS	SWE	UK	Certifications	Album
"Hot & Heavy"	1985	—	—	—	—	—		I Am the Night
"Cemetery Gates" (Note: "Cemetery Gates" charted in the U.S. upon its inclusion on the 1997 live album Official Live: 101 Proof.)	1990	32	—	99	—	—	RMNZ: Gold	Cowboys from Hell
"This Love"	1992	—	—	—	—	—		Vulgar Display of Power
"Hollow"	1992	—	—	—	—	—		Vulgar Display of Power
"Fucking Hostile"	1992	—	—	—	—	—		Vulgar Display of Power
"Becoming"	1994	—	—	—	—	—		Far Beyond Driven
"Suicide Note Pt. 1"	1996	—	—	—	—	—		The Great Southern Trendkill
"Floods"	1996	—	—	—	—	—		The Great Southern Trendkill
"Where You Come From"	1997	—	—	—	—	—		Official Live: 101 Proof
"Cat Scratch Fever"	1999	28	40	—	—	—		Detroit Rock City soundtrack
"Goddamn Electric"	2000	—	—	—	—	—		Reinventing the Steel
"I'll Cast a Shadow"	2000	—	—	—	—	—		Reinventing the Steel
"—" denotes a recording that did not chart or was not released in that territory.

== Guest appearances ==
List of appearances in other artists' works
Title	Year	Album
"Light Comes Out of Black"	1992	Buffy the Vampire Slayer: Original Motion Picture Soundtrack
"The Badge"	1994	The Crow - Original Motion Picture Soundtrack
"Cemetery Gates (Demon Knight Edit)"	1995	Tales from the Crypt: Demon Knight - Original Motion Picture Soundtrack
"Where You Come From"	1998	Strangeland - Original Motion Picture Soundtrack
"Cat Scratch Fever"	1999	Detroit Rock City - Original Motion Picture Soundtrack
"Immortally Insane"	2000	Heavy Metal 2000 - Original Soundtrack
"Electric Funeral"	2000	Nativity in Black II: A Tribute to Black Sabbath
"Avoid the Light"	2000	Dracula 2000 - Music from the Dimension Motion Picture
"Pre-Hibernation"	2001	SpongeBob SquarePants: Original Theme Highlights
"Puck Off"	2003	Dallas Stars: Greatest Hits

== Music videos ==
List of music videos
Title	Year	Director
"All Over Tonight"	1984	
"Hot and Heavy"	1985	
"Cowboys from Hell"	1990	Paul Rachman
"Psycho Holiday"	1990	Paul Rachman
"Cemetery Gates"	1990	Paul Rachman
"Primal Concrete Sledge (Live)"	1991	
"Domination (Live)"	1991	
"Mouth for War"	1992	Paul Rachman
"This Love"	1992	Kevin Kerslake
"Walk"	1992	Paul Anderson
"I'm Broken"	1994	Wayne Isham
"5 Minutes Alone"	1994	Wayne Isham
"Planet Caravan"	1994	Michael Boydstun
"Cemetery Gates (Demon Knight Version)"	1995	Wayne Isham
"Drag the Waters"	1996	Dimebag Darrell
"Revolution Is My Name"	2000	Jim Van Bebber
"Nothing to Lose" (with David Allan Coe)	2006	Videobob Moseley
"Piss"	2012	Zach Merck
