= Dimebag Darrell performances =

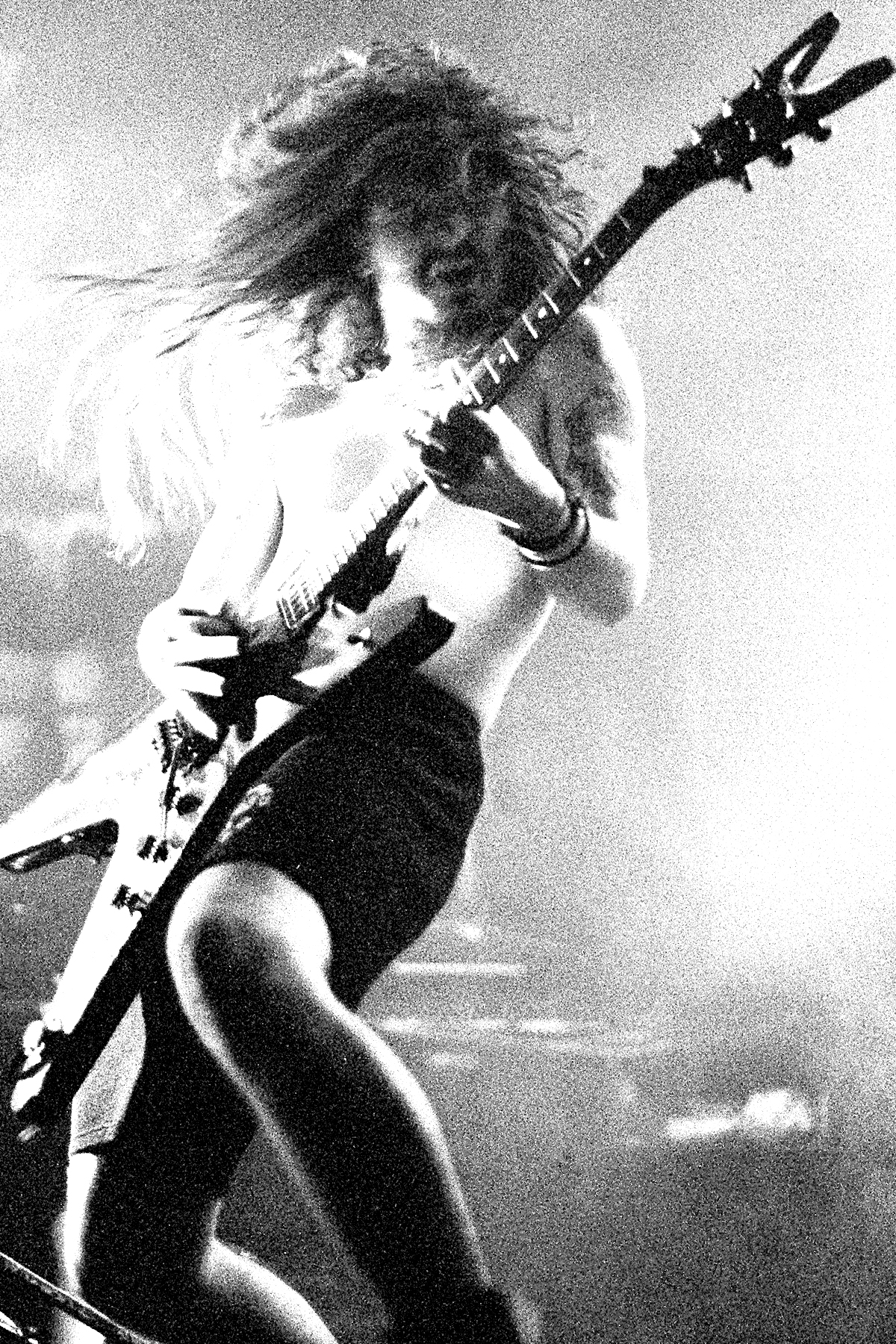
Dimebag Darrell performing in 1991

Darrell Lance Abbott, best known as Dimebag Darrell, was an American guitarist. He was a founding member of the heavy metal bands Pantera and Damageplan. His musical recordings and film appearances include:

== Under his name ==
- 1996: Supercop Soundtrack – "Caged in a Rage" (lead vocals and guitars)
- 2006: DimeVision Vol.1: That's the Fun I Have (DVD, footage compiled posthumously by Vinnie Paul Abbott)
- 2010: Metal Hammer CD May 2010 – "Dime's Blackout Society" (lead vocals and guitars, previously unreleased track released on the free CD with the May 2010's issue of Metal Hammer magazine)
- 2012: "Twisted" (lead vocals and guitars, previously unreleased track released with the introduction of Elephant Brand Skateboards' Dimebag tribute skateboard)
- 2014: "Whiskey Road" (all instruments and vocals, previously unreleased song tracked in 2001 on the Reinventing the Steel Tour in the US)
- 2017: Dimevision Vol. 2: Roll with It or Get Rolled Over
- 2017: The Hitz (EP)

== Pantera ==
- 1983: Metal Magic (first independent full album)
- 1984: Projects in the Jungle (second independent full album)
- 1985: The Hot 'n Heavy Home Vid (first independent home video with original lineup)
- 1985: I Am the Night (third independent full album)
- 1988: Power Metal (fourth independent full album)
- 1989: Cowboys from Hell Demos (demo tape for the first major label release Cowboys from Hell)
- 1990: Cowboys from Hell (first major label full album)
- 1991: Cowboys from Hell: The Videos (first home video)
- 1992: A Not So Vulgar Display of Power (seven-track in-store sampler CD)
- 1992: Hostile Mixes (four-track promo CD and 12" vinyl)
- 1992: For Those About to Rock: Monsters in Moscow (film)
- 1992: Vulgar Display of Power (second major label full album)
- 1992: Buffy the Vampire Slayer: Original Motion Picture Soundtrack – "Light Comes Out of Black" (with Rob Halford)
- 1993: Vulgar Video (second home video)
- 1993: Walk, Walk Biomechanical, Walk Cervical, and Walk Live Material (EPs)
- 1994: Driven Downunder Tour '94 Souvenir Collection (box set of three CD's and a booklet)
- 1994: Hostile Moments (EP)
- 1994: Far Beyond Driven (third major label full album)
- 1994: Alive and Hostile EP (five-track live CD)
- 1994: The Crow: Original Motion Picture Soundtrack – "The Badge" (Poison Idea cover)
- 1995: Demon Knight: Original Motion Picture Soundtrack – "Cemetery Gates (Demon Knight Edit)"
- 1996: The Great Southern Trendkill (fourth major label full album)
- 1996: The Singles 1991–1996 (six-CD box set)
- 1996: Becoming (six-track live EP; Japanese title 'Nosatsu Live')
- 1997: 3 Watch It Go (third home video)
- 1997: Official Live: 101 Proof (first live album)
- 1998: Live (three-track promo CD)
- 1998: Strangeland: Original Motion Picture Soundtrack – "Where You Come From"
- 1999: Detroit Rock City: Original Motion Picture Soundtrack – "Cat Scratch Fever" (Ted Nugent cover)
- 1999: 3 for One (box set of the first three major label albums)
- 2000: Heavy Metal 2000 – "Immortally Insane"
- 2000: Nativity in Black II: A Tribute to Black Sabbath – "Electric Funeral" (Black Sabbath cover)
- 2000: 3 Vulgar Videos from Hell (all three home videos released together on DVD)
- 2000: Sampler (three-track sampler CD)
- 2000: Unofficial Hits (sampler CD)
- 2000: Reinventing the Steel (fifth major label full album)
- 2000: Dracula 2000 soundtrack – "Avoid the Light"
- 2001: Extreme Steel Plus (seven-track EP)
- 2001: Revolution Is My Name (single/EP)
- 2001: SpongeBob SquarePants: Original Theme Highlights – "Pre-Hibernation" (instrumental)
- 2003: Dallas Stars: Greatest Hits – "Puck Off" (short song recorded for the Dallas Stars icehockey team)
- 2003: The Best of Pantera: Far Beyond the Great Southern Cowboys' Vulgar Hits! (first best-of CD including DVD)
- 2006: HiFive (five-track EP)
- 2008: 2in1 Pantera (second and third major albums released as a double CD)
- 2010: 1990–2000: A Decade of Domination (second best-of CD)

== Damageplan ==
- 2004: New Found Power

== Rebel Meets Rebel ==
- 2006: Rebel Meets Rebel (lead guitar and backing vocals)

== Hellyeah ==
- 2016: Unden!able – "I Don't Care Anymore" (Phil Collins cover; guitar parts)

== With Vinnie Paul ==
- 1996: Spacewalk: A Tribute to Ace Frehley – "Fractured Mirror" (Ace Frehley cover; lead guitars)
- 1997: Return of the Comet: A Tribute to Ace Frehley – "Snowblind" (Ace Frehley cover; lead vocals and guitars)

== With Philip Anselmo and Sean Yseult ==
- 1992: "Dawn of the Horrible Gorilla" (lead guitar and drum machine)

== Anthrax ==
- 1995: Stomp 442 – "Kingsize" (guitar solo) and "Riding Shotgun" (guitar solo)
- 1998: Volume 8: The Threat Is Real – "Inside Out" (guitar solo) and "Born Again Idiot" (guitar solo)
- 2003: We've Come for You All – "Strap It On" (guitar solo) and "Cadillac Rock Box" (spoken word intro and guitar solo)

== Drowning Pool ==
- 2002: Sinema (DVD, 2002, interview and footage compiler)

== Godsmack ==
- 2002: Smack This! (DVD, 2002; backstage footage and live material; cut from final DVD)

== King Diamond ==
- 1998: Voodoo – "Voodoo" (guitar solo)

== Nickelback ==
- 2003: The Long Road international edition – "Saturday Night's Alright for Fighting" (Elton John cover)
- 2003: Charlie's Angels: Full Throttle – "Saturday Night's Alright for Fighting" (Elton John cover)
- 2005: All the Right Reasons – "Side of a Bullet" (guitar solo composed posthumously from Vulgar Display of Power and Far Beyond Driven outtakes)
- 2008: Gotta Be Somebody (single) – "Saturday Night's Alright for Fighting" (Elton John cover)

== Scum Scunge ==
- 2003: Five Bucks Ain't Shit – "Believe" (guitar solo), "How Many Times" (guitar solo), and "Abuse" (guitar solo)
- 2005: Just a Taste EP – "Abuse" (guitar solo)

== Tres Diablos ==
- 1998: ECW: Extreme Music – "Heard It on the X" (ZZ Top cover; lead vocals and guitar)

== With Doug Pinnick ==
- "Born Under a Bad Sign" (Cream cover; lead guitar)

== With Throbbin' Donnie Rodd ==
- "Country Western Transvestite Whore" (lead vocals and guitar)

== With Sebastian Bach ==
- 2000: Randy Rhoads Tribute – "Believer" (Ozzy Osbourne cover; lead guitar)

== Gasoline ==
- 2002: Gasoline
- 2002: Goin' with the Gut
- 2002: This Ain't a Beer Belly, it's a Gas Tank For My Love Machine
- 2002: Get Drunk Now

== With Pumpjack ==
- 1996: Harvest (guitar solo)
