= 3 Watch It Go =

Video (VHS) by Pantera
- Released: November 11, 1997
- Genre: Groove metal
- Length: 120:56
- Label: Elektra
- Director: Dimebag Darrell; Daryl Arnberger
- Producer: Alyson Careaga

Pantera chronology
Vulgar Video (1993)	3 Watch It Go (1997)	3 Vulgar Videos from Hell (1999)

3 Watch It Go is the third home video by American heavy metal band Pantera. It was released on VHS through Elektra Records on November 11, 1997. The video features band footage and includes music videos for "Planet Caravan", "I'm Broken" and "5 Minutes Alone" from the studio album Far Beyond Driven (1994), and for "Drag the Waters" from The Great Southern Trendkill (1996). It won a 1997 Metal Edge Readers' Choice Award for Best Video Cassette.

3 Watch It Go was re-released on DVD, along with the two previous home videos of the band (Cowboys from Hell: The Videos and Vulgar Video), in the form of 3 Vulgar Videos from Hell.

== Track listing ==
1. "I'm Broken"
2. "5 Minutes Alone"
3. "Drag the Waters"
4. "Planet Caravan"

== Personnel ==
- Phil Anselmo – vocals
- Dimebag Darrell – guitar, director, film, footage
- Rex Brown – bass
- Vinnie Paul – drums
- Daryl "Bobby Tongs" Arnberger – director, film, footage
- David Lockard – assistant director
- Alyson Careaga – producer
- Erinn Williams – executive producer
- Brian Hicks – editor
- Ronny Gordon – editor
- Arnold Branch – online editor
- Rob Toscano – assistant online editor
- Daniel Ricci – audio mix, sound design
- Chris Floberg – additional audio engineering
- Aaron Barnes – additional footage
- Jeff Judd – additional footage

== Certifications ==
Region	Certification	Certified units/sales
Australia (ARIA)	Gold	7,500^{^}
United States (RIAA)	Platinum	100,000^{^}
^{^} Shipments figures based on certification alone.

== See also ==
- Pantera video albums
