= 3 Vulgar Videos from Hell =

- Original release

Video by Pantera
- Released: October 5, 1999
- Recorded: 1989–1997
- Genre: Groove metal
- Length: 245 minutes
- Label: East West

Pantera chronology
3 Watch It Go (1997)	3 Vulgar Videos from Hell (1999)

2006 re-release

Professional ratings
Review scores
Source	Rating
IGN	(7/10)

3 Vulgar Videos from Hell is a DVD by American heavy metal band Pantera, released in 1999 and re-released in 2006. It combines all three of the band's previous home videos (Cowboys from Hell: The Videos, Vulgar Video, and 3 Watch It Go) and features music videos, live performances, appearances, interviews, and footage of the band on tour and in the studio from mid-1989 to early 1997.

In 2018, there have been several teasers on the band's official Instagram page for the release of home video number 4. There has been no indication so far as to the date of release.

== Track listing ==
=== Disc 1 ===
Covers the Cowboys from Hell and Vulgar Display of Power eras (roughly 1990–1993). There are brief clips, in the beginning of the film, of a 1989 show during the band's Power Metal tour. The original version contains only one disc.

Cowboys from Hell: The Videos

- "Cowboys from Hell"
- "Psycho Holiday"
- "Cemetery Gates"
- "Mouth for War"
- "Heresy" (live at the 1990 Foundations Forum Convention in Los Angeles)
- "The Art of Shredding" (live at the 1990 Foundations Forum Convention in Los Angeles)

=== Disc 2 ===
3: Watch It Go

Covers primarily the Far Beyond Driven era and also partially The Great Southern Trendkill (roughly 1994–1997).

- "I'm Broken"
- "5 Minutes Alone"
- "Drag the Waters"
- "Planet Caravan"
- (Crazy Train 'Dimebag Darell Guitar medley solo')
- (HellRaiser MedlEY-Cowboys From Hell/Fucking Hostile/Shattered/Domination)

Monsters in Moscow

Part of the band's set at the 1991 "Monsters in Moscow" festival.

- "Cowboys from Hell"
- "Primal Concrete Sledge"
- "Psycho Holiday"

== Celebrity cameos ==
Several famous bands and musicians appear in the video. Among those who can be seen performing with Pantera are:

- Rob Halford (of Judas Priest)
- Kerry King (of Slayer)
- Exodus
- Tommy Victor (of Prong)
- Skid Row
- White Zombie
- Sacred Reich
- Suicidal Tendencies
- Alice in Chains
- Scott Ian (of Anthrax)
- Jason Newsted (of Metallica)
- Crowbar
- Marilyn Manson
- Kiss
- Sepultura
- Black Sabbath

Other celebrities who make guest appearances in the video include:

- Jerry Cantrell, Mike Starr and Layne Staley of Alice in Chains
- Mike Muir of Suicidal Tendencies
- Barry Stern of Trouble
- Kirk Windstein of Crowbar
- Ace Frehley and Gene Simmons of Kiss
- Tommy Lee of Mötley Crüe
- Sara Lee Lucas, Pogo, Twiggy Ramirez, and Marilyn Manson of Marilyn Manson
- Trent Reznor of Nine Inch Nails
- Billy Corgan of The Smashing Pumpkins
- Yngwie Malmsteen of Alcatrazz
- Robert Trujillo of Suicidal Tendencies and Metallica
- Nick Menza of Megadeth
- Jeff Hanneman of Slayer
- Tony Iommi of Black Sabbath

== Certifications ==
Region	Certification	Certified units/sales
Australia (ARIA)	Platinum	15,000^{^}
United States (RIAA)	Platinum	100,000^{^}
^{^} Shipments figures based on certification alone.
