= Vice (2018 soundtrack) =

Vice (Original Motion Picture Score)

Film score by Nicholas Britell
- Released: December 7, 2018
- Genre: Film score
- Length: 58:13
- Label: Decca
- Producer: Nicholas Britell

Nicholas Britell chronology
If Beale Street Could Talk (2018)	Vice (2018)	The King (2019)

Vice (Original Motion Picture Score) is the score album composed by Nicholas Britell to the 2018 American biographical political satire black comedy-drama film Vice, directed, written, and co-produced by Adam McKay. Based on the life of former U.S. Vice President Dick Cheney, the film stars Christian Bale in the title role with Amy Adams, Steve Carell, Sam Rockwell, Justin Kirk, Tyler Perry, Alison Pill, Lily Rabe, and Jesse Plemons in supporting roles. The film marked Britell's second collaboration with McKay after The Big Short (2015). The original score album was released in digital and physical formats on December 7, 2018 by Decca Records and a double vinyl edition released on August 30, 2019.

== Development ==
The score was composed using a 90-piece orchestra ranging from solo piano to classically styled orchestral music to big-band jazz, as "The film explores the story of his life and the story of America in parallel, and the music explores different genres as it all evolves over the decades of the story." He felt the idea of how a "typical American-symphonic sound is" and how Cheney's journey progresses. In the structure of the film's music, there is also certain dissonance woven into the score, as "Cheney worked in the shadows, there is also this question of what is true and what is false that has become such a big part of our daily conversation." The theme cue "The Lineman" follows Cheney's journey in politics from younger age, has the shape of a "trumpet theme" suggesting the idea of the West and Americana, and consciously include notes that do not fit the theme. A "power motif" was also created in the score which was meant for "crazy big bands" or "hip hop tracks", but occurs in different places in the film.

Britell had written a musical number, featuring Steve Carell as Donald Rumsfeld teaching Cheney on how power works around Washington D.C. and in the White House of Richard Nixon. The song was sung by Alabama Shakes' frontman Brittany Howard and choreographed by Andy Blankenbuehler. McKay mentioned the score as "breathtaking" and "incredible", but however could not include in the film's test screenings. He mentioned about the number, "It was kind of when Rumsfeld is teaching Cheney about Washington D.C. and how to get ahead. It's sort of like 'neither a borrower nor a lender be,' he's kind of giving him that speech. But the speech is about, 'Who cares about anything? You've got to just get ahead of people, making your moves.' I think there was a line in it, 'The means justify the ends,' which I always loved." He further had possibilities of that scene being included in the Blu-ray version of the film.

== Track listing ==
No.	Title	Length
1.	"The Lineman – Prelude And Development"	2:10
2.	"He Saw an Opportunity – Counterpoint in C Minor"	2:19
3.	"Vice – Main Title Piano Suite"	1:51
4.	"Master of the Switchblade"	1:56
5.	"Flipping Cards"	1:22
6.	"B-Flat Prelude"	1:13
7.	"The Lineman in E-Flat Minor"	1:49
8.	"Taking Over the Damn Place"	3:26
9.	"Scalia"	0:19
10.	"James Earl Carter Jr."	1:14
11.	"The Wyoming Campaign"	3:23
12.	"The Other Half Fears Us"	2:08
13.	"Dick's Heart Is Healthier Than Ever"	1:51
14.	"He Wants to Impress His Father"	2:00
15.	"My Friend, My Running Mate"	0:53
16.	"The Washington Game Board"	2:42
17.	"The Many Offices of The VP"	1:56
18.	"The War in Afghanistan / His Magnum Opus"	2:34
19.	"The Iraq War Symphony"	2:48
20.	"Major Combat Operations Have Ended"	1:53
21.	"At Death's Door"	2:40
22.	"Conclusion – The Transplant"	7:07
23.	"Vice – Main Title Orchestra Suite"	1:52
24.	"Imperium"	1:45
25.	"G Minor Prelude"	2:59
26.	"Parade Music (Bonus Track)"	2:03
Total length:		58:13

== Additional music ==
- "Send Me the Pillow You Dream On" – Hank Locklin (songwriter, performer)
- "Big Dipper" – Nicholas Britell (writer)
- "Va Va Voom" – Levi Brown and Junior Mintz
- "Dear Okie" – Rudy Sooter (songwriter) and Doye O'Dell (songwriter, performer)
- "Rock Me Baby" – James Clency (songwriter) and Jimmy Haggett (performer)
- "Manhattan Calling" – Werner Tautz
- "SpongeBob SquarePants Theme" – Derek Drymon, Mark Harrison, Stephen Hillenburg, Blaise Smith (songwriters) and Patrick Pinney (performer)
- "O Come, All Ye Faithful" – Nicholas Britell (arrangement)
- "Nighthawks" – Nicholas Britell (writer)
- "NBC News Theme" – John Williams
- "La Grande Valse" – Nicholas Britell (writer)
- "America" – Leonard Bernstein, Stephen Sondheim (songwriters), Angelina Réaux, Louise Edeiken, Stella Zambalis, Tatiana Troyanos and Orchestra (performers)

== Reception ==
James Southall of Movie Wave wrote "Writing a film score that is both satirical and sincere at the same time is one of the most difficult balancing acts a composer can undertake. You have to key the audience in to the joke while not overselling it to the point of obviousness, but then also use that same music to score scenes that are intended to be viewed un-ironically; finding that line can be a key element in whether a film is successful or not. Nicholas Britell not only found that line in Vice, but he also made his score genuinely interesting and appealing from a musical point of view – something that many composers fail to do." and called "Vice is his standout score of the year, and it confirms that this is a composer whose voice will continue to be heard for many years to come." David Edelstein of Vulture wrote that Britell's score is "deadly serious even when the film is at its zaniest". LATF USA-based critic felt that Britell's score "nicely complements the film's comic and dramatic elements". Alci Rengifo of Riot Material wrote "The music by Nicholas Britell is fittingly imperial, emphasizing the story with grand trumpets both somber and martial." It has been complimented by film critics as "one of the best scores of 2018" by publications such as IndieWire, Vulture, and Film School Rejects along with Britell's If Beale Street Could Talk.

== Accolades ==
Vice was shortlisted at the 91st Academy Awards for Best Original Score category, along with Nicholas Britell's score for If Beale Street Could Talk. However, the latter was officially nominated for the category, and was similarly included in other major ceremonies and nominations. Britell however, won the World Soundtrack Awards for Soundtrack Composer of the Year in 2019, for both the films.
