= Plankton: The Movie (soundtrack) =

Plankton: The Movie (Original Motion Picture Soundtrack)

Soundtrack album by Mahuia Bridgman-Cooper and various artists
- Released: March 7, 2025
- Recorded: 2023–2025
- Studios: Roundhead Studios, Auckland
- Length: 30:12
- Label: Lakeshore Records
- Producers: Mahuia Bridgman-Cooper; Karyn Rachtman; Otis Ratchman

Plankton: The Movie (Original Motion Picture Soundtrack) is the soundtrack to the 2025 musical comedy film Plankton: The Movie based on the television series SpongeBob SquarePants, created by Stephen Hillenburg. It was released on March 7, 2025, the same day as the film's release through Netflix. The album accompanied the film's original score composed by Mahuia Bridgman-Cooper and original songs written by Bret McKenzie, Linda Perry, Mark Mothersbaugh, and Bob Mothersbaugh, and performed by the voice actors.

== Background ==
Mahuia Bridgman-Cooper was announced as the composer, with Karyn Rachtman and Otis Ratchman as music supervisors. Additionally, the film features original songs written by Bret McKenzie, Linda Perry, Mark Mothersbaugh, and Bob Mothersbaugh. Waller said that as production progressed, the film "sneakily" became a musical project, which he felt to be unusual for them. He noted that series creator, Stephen Hillenburg, tried to incorporate a selection of eclectic bands to provide music for the series, and felt the musical diversity of Plankton: The Movie was their way of honoring that. Ceccarelli described working with McKenzie, Perry, and Mark and Bob Mothersbaugh as a dream come true for the crew. The film's musical nature allowed Lawrence and Talley to tinker with their vocal performances for Plankton and Karen in ways they have never before. Talley said on voicing her character: "Being a villain is a blast, I played this character for so long, but Karen isn't confined to one box. She's bigger than that and to shake it up has been fun." The songs and score were recorded at the Roundhead Studios in Auckland, with the Auckland Philharmonia performing the score.

== Release ==
The soundtrack album was released by Lakeshore Records on March 7, 2025, the same day as the film.

== Track listing ==
Plankton: The Movie (Original Motion Picture Soundtrack) track listing
No.	Title	Artist(s)	Length
1.	"Welcome to Bikini Bottom"	SpongeBob SquarePants	1:18
2.	"I'm Plankton"	Plankton and Karen	1:50
3.	"Going Up"	Mahuia Bridgman-Cooper	1:19
4.	"Say My Name, Karen"	Karen and SpongeBob SquarePants	2:20
5.	"I Made a New Friend"	Plankton	2:07
6.	"Bad Trip"	Bridgman-Cooper	1:50
7.	"I'm a Jerky Jerk"	Plankton	1:59
8.	"You and Me"	Princess Chelsea and Jonathan Bree	2:40
9.	"Taking Over"	Boots	2:19
10.	"You Do Care"	Bridgman-Cooper	2:06
11.	"80's Baby"	Bridgman-Cooper	1:18
12.	"Hydra"	Bridgman-Cooper	1:41
13.	"Gal Pals"	Bridgman-Cooper	1:52
14.	"Shaggy"	Bridgman-Cooper	1:18
15.	"Welcome Back to Bikini Bottom"	SpongeBob SquarePants	2:08
16.	"Say My Name, Karen (Demo Version)"	Bret McKenzie and Linda Perry	2:07

== Reception ==
Julian Roman of MovieWeb wrote "Plankton: The Movie has a better soundtrack than the previous films [...] The songs are fantastic and will definitely have children singing along. Composer Mahuia Bridgman-Cooper and the film's music supervisors also deserve recognition for raising the musical game." Jesse Hassenger of The Guardian, while noted the musical numbers being "potentially extraneous" it added to "what make Plankton fun while simultaneously creating the impression that the story at hand is on the static side."

Ferdosa Abdi of Screen Rant wrote "The music is engaging, helping bolster the storytelling while including a great deal of fun jokes. The music and the overall writing blend well, creating a very energetic atmosphere [...] Mahuia Bridgman-Cooper creates the ideal roadmap for the endearingly convoluted animated adventure and is noticeably more enmeshed with the material than other previous scores. The music in the SpongeBob universe has always been essential, but here, it is noticeably more involved."

Bill Goodykontz of The Arizona Republic noted "some of the songs are fun, as always", as did Aidan Kelley of Collider who added "the songs in Plankton: The Movie are quite excellent." Max Vetter and Dani Biondi of Washington Square News criticised the musical numbers being "stitled".
