= The SpongeBob SquarePants Movie – Music from the Movie and More... =

2004 soundtrack album

The SpongeBob SquarePants Movie: Music from the Movie and More...

Soundtrack album by various artists
- Released: November 9, 2004
- Recorded: 1992; 1997; July 1–16, 2004 in New Orleans
- Genres: Surf; alternative rock; pop rock; hard rock; hip hop; heavy metal
- Length: 40:16
- Labels: Nickelodeon; Sire
- Producers: Stephen Hillenburg (exec.); Karyn Rachtman

SpongeBob SquarePants chronology
SpongeBob SquarePants: Original Theme Highlights (2001)	The SpongeBob SquarePants Movie: Music from the Movie and More... (2004)	The Yellow Album (2005)

Professional ratings
Review scores
Source	Rating
AllMusic	4/5 stars
Empire	2/5 stars
Entertainment Weekly	(positive)
IGN	(8.9/10.0)
Pitchfork Media	(3.9/10)

The SpongeBob SquarePants Movie – Music from the Movie and More... is the soundtrack to the 2004 animated film The SpongeBob SquarePants Movie, and the second soundtrack album focused on the American animated series SpongeBob SquarePants. It was released on November 9, 2004, by Sire Records and Nick Records.

== Background ==
The album is an example of the crew of SpongeBob SquarePants' musical tastes. When The Flaming Lips member Wayne Coyne suggested a duet with Justin Timberlake, series creator Stephen Hillenburg refused, not wanting "any of those sort of commercial weirdos" on the soundtrack, and instead sticking to his preferred musical taste. The Flaming Lips performed "SpongeBob & Patrick Confront the Psychic Wall of Energy" on Late Night with Conan O'Brien the night before the film's release on November 19, 2004. During the performance, Wayne Coyne was encased in a giant bubble (similar to zorbs). A music video for the song was filmed as well.

The song "Goofy Goober Rock" is a parody of "I Wanna Rock" by Twisted Sister, and Motörhead's "You Better Swim" is a rewritten version of "You Better Run" from their 1992 album March ör Die.

== Track listing ==
No.	Title	Writer(s)	Length
1.	"SpongeBob SquarePants Theme" (Avril Lavigne)	Derek Drymon, Stephen Hillenburg, Mark Harrison, Blaise Smith	0:46
2.	"SpongeBob & Patrick Confront the Psychic Wall of Energy" (The Flaming Lips)	Wayne Coyne, Steven Drozd, Michael Ivins	3:39
3.	"Just a Kid" (Wilco)	Jeff Tweedy	2:51
4.	"The Goofy Goober Song" (Mike Simpson with SpongeBob, Patrick, and Goofy Goober)	Eban Schletter, Mike Simpson, Hillenburg, Derek Drymon, Tim Hill, Kent Osborne, Paul Tibbitt, Aaron Springer	2:41
5.	"Prince Paul's Bubble Party" (The Waikikis, Prince Paul, & Wordsworth)	Setsuo Ohashi, Yasuteru Miura, Wordsworth, Drymon, Hill, Hillenburg, Osborne, Springer, Tibbitt, Ennio Torresan, Eric Weise	2:29
6.	"Bikini Bottom" (Electrocute)	Nicole Morier, Ghazi Barakart	3:40
7.	"The Best Day Ever" (SpongeBob SquarePants (End Credits))	Andy Paley, Tom Kenny	3:02
8.	"They'll Soon Discover" (The Shins)	James Mercer	3:24
9.	"Ocean Man" (Ween)	Michael Melchiondo, Aaron Freeman	2:07
10.	"Under My Rock" (Patrick)	Paley, Kenny	3:17
11.	"Now That We're Men" (SpongeBob, Patrick, and The Monsters with the London Metropolitan Orchestra)	Will Schaefer, Hillenburg, Drymon, Hill, Osborne, Tibbitt, Springer	1:50
12.	"Goofy Goober Rock" (Tom Rothrock with Jim Wise)	Dee Snider, Drymon, Hill, Hillenburg, Osborne, Springer, Tibbitt	2:54
13.	"You Better Swim" (Motörhead)	Ian Fraser Kilmister	5:14
14.	"The Jellyfish Song by The Jellyfish Band" (Plus-Tech Squeeze Box (featuring SpongeBob SquarePants))	Tomonori Hayashibe	1:15
15.	"SpongeBob SquarePants Theme (Movie Version)" (The Pirates)	Drymon, Hillenburg, Harrison, Smith	1:01

== Personnel ==
All information is derived from the booklet enclosed with the album.
Production

- Stephen Hillenburg – Producer
- Karyn Rachtman – Producer
- Andrew Weiss – Producer (uncredited)
- Andy Paley – Producer, vocals, instrumentation
- Gina Shay – Co-producer
- Tom Whalley – Executive album producer for Sire/Warner Bros. Records
- Seymour Stein – Executive album producer for Sire/Warner Bros. Records
- Craig Aaronson – Executive album producer for Sire/Warner Bros. Records
- Sessing Music Services – Music clearance
- Eban Schletter – Music consultant
- Pat Kraus – Mastering
- Michael Hately – Mastering
- Andrew Scheps – Engineer
- Heavy Iron Studios - Developer for Sire/Warner Bros. Records

== Score ==
The SpongeBob SquarePants Movie (Original Motion Picture Score)
No.	Title	Length
1.	"Opening Titles: Treasure Chest"	1:01
2.	"SpongeBob Opening Theme Song"	1:08
3.	"Bring the Prisoner Forward"	0:37
4.	"Mindy & King Neptune"	0:44
5.	"King Neptune and Eugene Krabs"	1:11
6.	"Eugene Krabs on Fire"	1:03
7.	"I Have a Crab to Cook"	1:22
8.	"The Road to Shell City""	1:24
9.	"The Two Heroes"	1:08
10.	"Plankton Steals the Formula"	0:38
11.	"Evil Dennis"	1:17
12.	"Squidward's Good Morning"	0:58
13.	"Brain Control Devices"	1:20
14.	"Patrick and SpongeBob Driving"	1:06
15.	"Ice Cream Monster"	1:02
16.	"I Am Going Home"	0:56
17.	"Planktopolis"	0:31
18.	"Bigger Boot"	0:46
19.	"The Cyclopes"	0:59
20.	"Those Fish Are Dead"	2:02
21.	"The Two Friends End"	2:57
22.	"Let's Get That Crown Part 1"	0:45
23.	"Let's Get That Crown Part 2"	1:07
24.	"Fight With Dennis"	1:43
25.	"The Hasselhoff Catapult"	1:00
26.	"Just In Time"	0:33
27.	"SpongeBob Theme Song Reprise"	1:01
Total length:		30:46

== Chart positions ==
Chart (2004)	Peak position
Canadian Albums (Billboard)	79
U.S. Billboard 200	76
U.S. Top Soundtracks (Billboard)	4

Chart (2025)	Peak position
Hungarian Physical Albums (MAHASZ)	10
