= For Those About to Rock: Monsters in Moscow =

1992 film by Wayne Isham

Monsters Of Rock Moscow 91'
- Directed by: Wayne Isham
- Starring: AC/DC; Metallica; The Black Crowes; Pantera; E.S.T.
- Release date: 1992
- Running time: 84 minutes
- Language: English

For Those About to Rock: Monsters in Moscow is a 1992 film featuring live performances by rock and heavy metal bands AC/DC, Metallica, The Black Crowes, Pantera, and E.S.T. in the Tushino Airfield in Moscow, during the dissolution of the Soviet Union.

On September 28, 1991, only a month after the August Putsch failed, 500,000 (the figure stated in the notes of the original VHS and subsequent DVD release) rock and metal music fans converged in Moscow at Tushino Airfield for the first open-air rock concert, as part of the Monsters of Rock series. The concert was completely free, causing many people to flock to the concert. The versions of "Whole Lotta Rosie" and "The Jack" that AC/DC performed at this concert were released on two of AC/DC's live albums, AC/DC Live and AC/DC Live: 2 CD Collector's Edition.

== Track listing ==
Pantera

1. ”Cowboys from Hell" (Anselmo, D. Abbott, V. Abbott, Brown)
2. "Primal Concrete Sledge" (Anselmo, D. Abbott, V. Abbott, Brown)
3. "Psycho Holiday" (Anselmo, D. Abbott, V. Abbott, Brown)
4. "Domination" (Anselmo, D. Abbott, V. Abbott, Brown)

E.S.T.

1. "Bully"

The Black Crowes

1. "Stare It Cold" (Robinson, Robinson, Cease, Colt, Gorman)
2. "Rainy Day Women#12 & 35" (Dylan)

Metallica

1. "The Ecstasy of Gold"
2. "Enter Sandman" (Hammett, Hetfield, Ulrich)
3. "Creeping Death" (Hammett, Hetfield, Ulrich, Burton)
4. "Harvester of Sorrow" (Hetfield, Ulrich)
5. "Fade to Black" (Hammett, Hetfield, Ulrich, Burton)
6. "Sad But True" (Hetfield, Ulrich)
7. "Master of Puppets" (Hammett, Hetfield, Ulrich, Burton)
8. "Seek and Destroy" (Hetfield, Ulrich)
9. "For Whom The Bell Tolls" (Hetfield, Ulrich, Burton)
10. "Whiplash" (Hetfield, Ulrich)
11. "Encore Jam" (Hammett, Hetfield, Ulrich, Newsted)
12. "Last Caress" (Danzig)
13. "Am I Evil?" (Tatler, Harris)

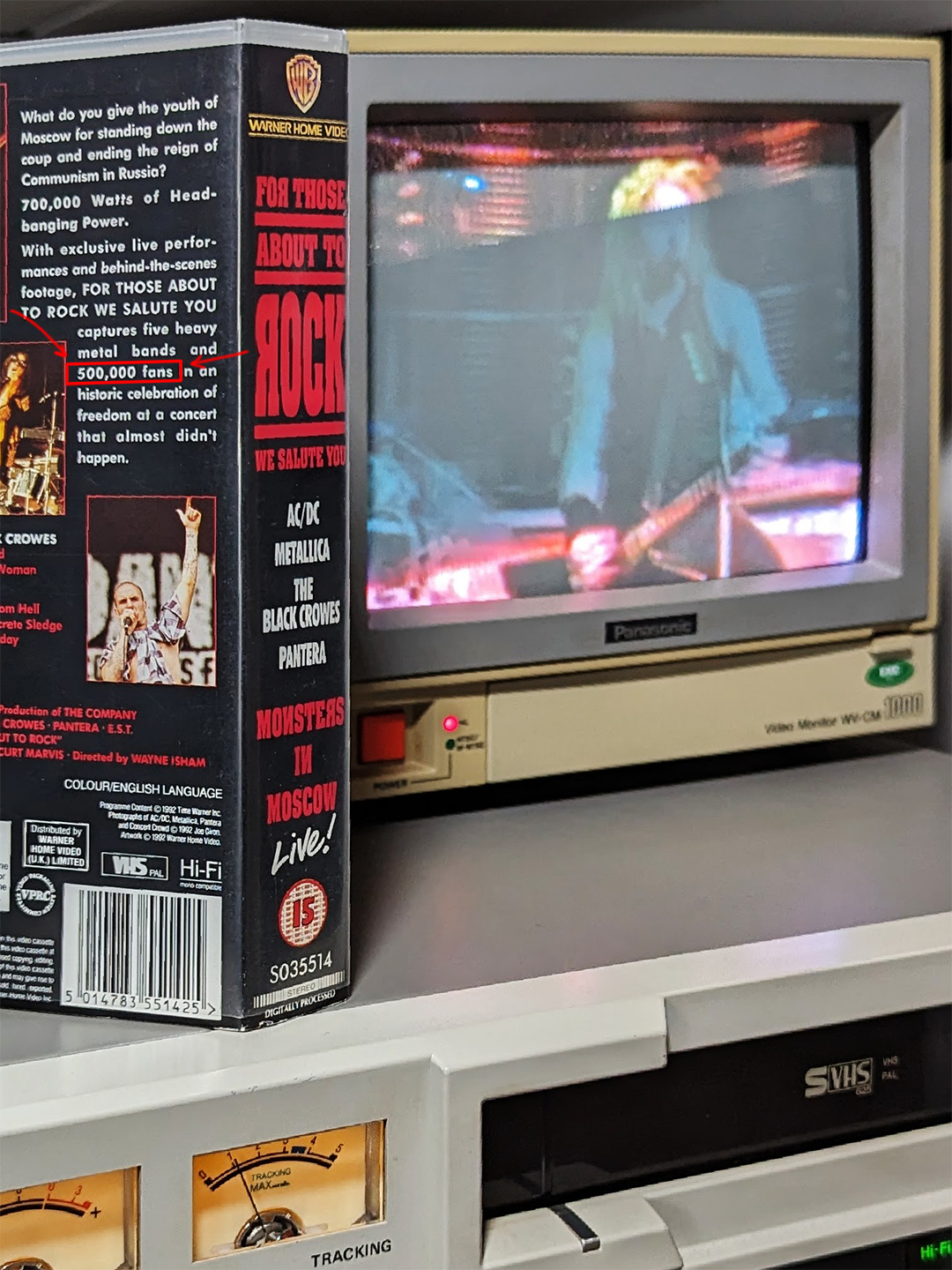
Back cover of the VHS cassette stating 500,000 fans - a figure that has been constantly inflated later without any proof

AC/DC

1. "Back in Black" (A. Young, M. Young, Johnson)
2. "Highway to Hell" (A. Young, M. Young, Scott)
3. "Whole Lotta Rosie" (A. Young, M. Young, Scott)
4. "For Those About to Rock (We Salute You)" (A. Young, M. Young, Johnson)
