= Saving Bikini Bottom: The Sandy Cheeks Movie (soundtrack) =

2024 movie soundtrack album

Saving Bikini Bottom: The Sandy Cheeks Movie (Original Motion Picture Soundtrack)

Soundtrack album by Moniker and the cast of Saving Bikini Bottom: The Sandy Cheeks Movie
- Released: August 2, 2024
- Recorded: 2021–2024
- Studio: Massey Studios, Massey University, Palmerston North, New Zealand
- Length: 21:27
- Label: Lakeshore Records
- Producer: Moniker; Karyn Rachtman

Saving Bikini Bottom: The Sandy Cheeks Movie (Original Motion Picture Soundtrack) is the soundtrack to the 2024 adventure comedy film Saving Bikini Bottom: The Sandy Cheeks Movie based on the animated television series SpongeBob SquarePants, created by Stephen Hillenburg. The soundtrack was released through Lakeshore Records on August 2, 2024, the same day as the film's premiere through Netflix and featured original score composed by the band Moniker, along with original songs performed by the voice actors.

== Development ==
The film score is composed by the New Zealand-based musical trio Moniker, consisting of film and television composers Lukasz Buda, Conrad Wedde and Samuel Scott. Karyn Rachtman served as the music supervisor. Tami Neilson performed the Sandy Cheeks Theme based on the SpongeBob SquarePants theme and further wrote few original songs with Linda Perry, Kaz, Jacques Brautbar, and Chantal Claret. Having grew up watching SpongeBob SquarePants and considered it as the favorite show for her kids, she found enthusiastic to be involved in the project. Initially, her vocals were noted for being sounded like "very motherly and school teacherish" and the composers wanted it to "sound like an unhinged cowgirl", which led to her adapting the vocal styles.

The songs were recorded three years prior to the start of the film's production, and the overall composition and recording took them two years. Scott added "In animation you have to work to these unfinished sketched animatics, so you need to imagine the finished film. We wanted to be true to the freewheeling spirit of the original SpongeBob cartoon but also tap into the 80s kids films we grew up with. There is no way we could have achieved that without working with a real orchestra. It was a huge project, but deeply rewarding."

The score and songs were recorded at the newly built Massey Studios located at the Massey University in Palmerston North, New Zealand. The venue was chosen in order to record 60 minutes of music and can accompany a larger orchestra. The venue had two control rooms, where he would discuss with Rachtman and editors Billy Weber and Matthew Feinman about the use of cues in the final edit, while the other control room had the orchestrators, conductors and studio personnel supervise the orchestra recording. The New Zealand Symphony Orchestra (NZSO) performed the score which was conducted by Brent Stewart and Hamish Mckeitch, orchestrated by Claire Cowan and engineered by Graham Kennedy.

== Release ==
The film's soundtrack album was released by Lakeshore Records on August 2, 2024, the same day as the film.

== Track listing ==
Saving Bikini Bottom: The Sandy Cheeks Movie (Original Motion Picture Soundtrack) track listing
No.	Title	Artist(s)	Length
1.	"Sandy Cheeks Theme"	Tami Neilson	1:41
2.	"My Name Is Sandy Cheeks"	Saving Bikini Bottom: The Sandy Cheeks Movie cast	2:06
3.	"The Amazing Flying Cheeks"	Linda Perry & Rhodes Gilbert-Perry	0:35
4.	"She Makes Waves"	Chantal Claret	3:11
5.	"This Squirrel's Done Good"	Cast	1:41
6.	"Squidward Breathes"	Cast	1:50
7.	"Focus Group"	Moniker	1:05
8.	"Digger Claw Attack"	Moniker	2:35
9.	"Blast Off"	Moniker	1:31
10.	"Memories"	Moniker	2:38
11.	"Rattlesnakes"	Moniker	2:34

== Reception ==
Dhruv Sharma of Screen Rant noted that the soundtrack "perfectly couples some of its pivotal moments with relevant songs that add even more heft to its portrayal of Sandy and SpongeBob's adventure." Tara Bennett of Paste wrote "The Sandy Cheeks Movie continues the series tradition of including musical numbers, the best being Sandy's opening number (penned by Linda Perry of 4 Non Blondes fame)". Catherine Bray of The Guardian and Peter Debruge of Variety found the music to be "cheesy" and "passable".
