= Rachtman =

Rachtman is a surname. Notable people with the surname include:

- Karyn Rachtman (born 1964), American music supervisor and film producer
- Riki Rachtman (born 1965), American television and radio personality
