= The King (soundtrack) =

The King (Original Score from the Netflix Film)

Film score by Nicholas Britell
- Released: 1 November 2019
- Recorded: 2019
- Studio: British Grove Studios; Air Studios
- Genre: Film score
- Length: 43:31
- Label: Lakeshore
- Producer: Nicholas Britell

Nicholas Britell chronology
Vice (2018)	The King (2019)	Cruella (2021)

The King (Original Score from the Netflix Film) is the score album to the 2019 film of the same name, directed by David Michôd and starring Timothée Chalamet, Joel Edgerton, Sean Harris, Tom Glynn-Carney, Lily-Rose Depp, Thomasin McKenzie, Robert Pattinson, and Ben Mendelsohn. The original score to the film is composed by Nicholas Britell who approached a futuristic music set in the 25th century, despite being the film set in the medieval period. He called it as the most "dark and sombre" music, he had composed, reflecting the setting and soundscape.

The score album was released on 1 November 2019 by Lakeshore Records, coinciding with the Netflix release and received positive critical response. On 8 July 2022, the score was released into a double LP vinyl.

== Development ==
One of the producers from Plan B Entertainment which produced the film, Dede Gardner had approached Britell in January 2019, and watched rough cuts of the film without music and felt it "right away like this amazing canvas to imagine a musical landscape", appreciating the film's script, cinematography and performances, and agreed to be a part of the film as he did not score for a period film. His instinct on scoring for the film was to imagine that the film was set not in the 15th century but in the 25th century, and had thought of a set of sounds that could work in either the past or the future.

"... I think it's related to the idea that Hal feels so captive to this new office of King; he's, himself, unsure of his own feelings, at times [...] before the events of the film have taken place, he's leading a very different life, and I think the idea of being uncertain of your fate, and at the same time having so much responsibility for others, is such an interesting dynamic. I think virtually everyone goes through a real complex period of life when they're coming of age, when you're learning about how the world works, and shedding some of your ideas, and to have that be happening concurrently with becoming the leader of a nation is kind of a mind-blowing idea."

— Nicholas Britell, referring to Hal's mindset while scoring the film.

He started working on the score during that March 2019 and explored with various sounds and instruments, including bass clarinets played outside the range and used in tape filters to create a "human, yet strange feeling". A theme called "Tetrachord" where the motif goes from the first to the fifth descend of the scale, was the "ancient motif used for thousand years", and Britell felt that "there's something about the downward scale that has this darkness and sadness" as the film is "dark and sombre". Britell recalled on what director David Michôd had said that "the zone that he was hoping for, feeling wise, was the idea that this is almost like a hell on earth. The land is sick under Henry IV, and there's already a darkness there in the landscape. So, it's a combination of factors that I think led to a dark score."

In addition to bass clarinets, he used a sound of metal and distorted it throughout the score, so that it "felt musical and wove the sound into a lot of the pieces. At times, it's more noticeable and more subtle, but there's literally just the sound of clanging metal in some of these pieces." The strings were felt like "something that could represent the story across the ages, in a way" and spent a lot of time with Michôd on the use of strings as there are multiple ways it can be played, as the sound can be emotional, or can have vibrato or non-vibrato. They experimented with multiple variations of strings, as they wanted it to have a sense of "emotion and richness" and had to represent the time period.

He orchestrated the string music, so that there are more violas, celli and basses, proportionally to have a "lower, richer sound". The violins in the orchestra were recorded at the British Grove Studios in London and had the Trinity Boys Choir performing chorals. The inclusion of Trinity choir is to provide a "wordless choir" and "resonates musically and symbolically" with the film. The cues were titled as "ballade", "canticle" and "hymn" as Britell wanted to "deep dive into late medieval music and early renaissance music". He further researched with John Dunstaple's works on the same, as the research itself had an interesting impact and tried to channel with some of the names, such as ballade or hymn, as they imply certain ideas and feelings.

== Track listing ==
No.	Title	Length
1.	"Ballade in C# Minor: Coronation"	2:28
2.	"Estampie – Eastcheap"	1:16
3.	"Song of Hal: Strings in C# Minor"	5:12
4.	"Tetrachord – War and Fate"	2:14
5.	"Canticle in E Minor"	1:58
6.	"Hymn – Mvmt 1: Prelude"	3:53
7.	"Ballade in F# Minor: Trebuchets"	1:56
8.	"Song of Hal: Strings in B Minor"	4:20
9.	"Ballade in B-flat Minor: Descent"	2:23
10.	"Antiphon"	2:16
11.	"Marche – Agincourt"	2:46
12.	"Hymn – Mvmt 2: Lament"	3:41
13.	"Tetrachord – Rex"	1:26
14.	"Hymn – Mvmt 3: Elegy"	2:46
15.	"Song of Hal: Conclusio in C Minor"	4:50
Total length:		43:31

== Reception ==
Britell's score received critical acclaim. James Southall of Movie Wave wrote: "The album is resolutely not an easy listen – it's frequently as black as coal, in parts really rather difficult – don't expect anything like the two famous earlier Henry V scores. But really, it's great that there is a place today for a film score like this – Britell is a smart, impressive composer who's surely got a wonderful career ahead of him. The King is so dramatically potent and the emotion runs deep – it's subtle and that's becoming so much less common, it's actually really enriching hearing something where you have to put the effort in to get the reward." In her review for GQ, Iana Murray said that Britell's score "is a delicate mood-setter until it explodes in bellowing horns and a roaring choir". Isaac Butler of Slate Magazine called it "one of his most indifferent scores". Commercially, the score album was streamed over eighteen million times on the music streaming platform Spotify.

== Release history ==
Release dates and formats for The King (Original Score from the Netflix Film)
Region	Date	Format(s)	Label	Ref.
Various	November 1, 2019	CD; digital download; streaming	Lakeshore	
Various	July 8, 2022	Vinyl	Lakeshore	

== Accolades ==
Award	Date of ceremony	Category	Nominee(s)	Result	Ref.
Hollywood Music in Media Awards	20 November 2019	Best Original Score in a Feature Film	Nicholas Britell	Nominated	
