= Electrocute (band) =

American-German rock group

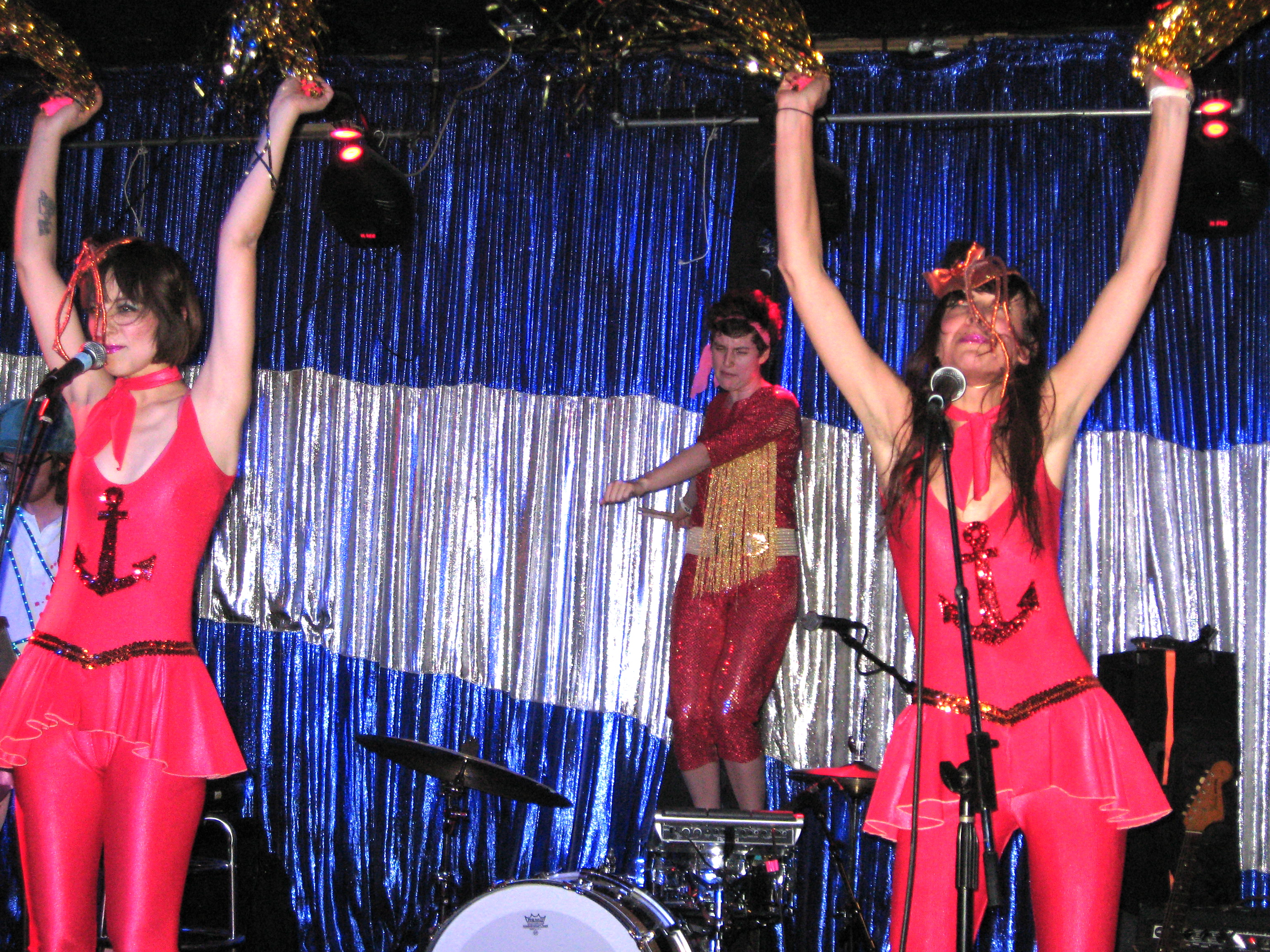
- Electrocute performing at the Los Angeles club "Spaceland," February 2008.

Background information
- Origin: Berlin, Germany
- Genres: Alternative rock, electroclash
- Years active: 2002 - present
- Members: Nicole Morier; Legs Le Brock
- Past members: Mia Dime; Holly Doll

Electrocute is an American-German rock group. It was founded by Nicole Morier, a singer from Albuquerque New Mexico, and former member Mia Dime in Berlin, Germany in 2002. The formation was motivated by the explosive electropop/electroclash music scene happening in Berlin at the time.

After releasing one EP and one LP on the now defunct Emperor Norton records, Dime left the band and Morier continued touring, hiring Holly Herndon aka Holly Doll to fill in. The two toured extensively throughout Europe, America, and Australia, where they played the Big Day Out festival in 2005 and met Sydney-based DJ Mindy, a.k.a. "Legs Le Brock," who was DJing an afterparty.

Morier eventually moved to Los Angeles and temporarily disbanded the band to pursue her songwriting career. Later, she met up once again with Legs Le Brock, who had also recently relocated to LA. The duo began doing DJ nights, and when Morier was asked by Mexican arts and culture magazine Celeste to tour in Mexico with Electrocute, she invited Le Brock to join her.

The duo have since toured Europe, returned to Mexico several times and played the Infest in Santiago, Chile. They also have incorporated other members into their live act, including Bram Inscore (keyboards, samples, programming), Bobby Gruska (drums), Jesse Wood (guitars) and John Kirby (keyboards).

In 2004, the band contributed the track "Bikini Bottom" to The SpongeBob SquarePants Movie soundtrack.

Their song "Kleiner dicker Junge" was prominently featured in the 2005 film The Beat That My Heart Skipped.

In 2008, they released the EP On the Beat featuring the Dutch artist Junkie XL.

Their album Double Diamond was exclusively released in Japan during the summer of 2009. It features all the tracks from the On The Beat EP as well as six new songs and three instrumentals.

== Discography ==
Full-length albums and EPs

- 2003 – A Tribute to Your Taste
- 2005 – Troublesome Bubblegum
- 2008 – On the Beat
- 2009 – Double Diamond
- 2016 – Xmas
- 2021 – Make Some Noise

Singles

- 2003 – "Sugar Buzz"
- 2005 – "Shag Ball"
- 2005 – "Cops Copulating"
- 2008 – "Bad Legs"
- 2008 – "On the Beat"
- 2008 – "Mad Pursuit" (with Junkie XL)

Other appearances

- 2004 – "Bikini Bottom" (on The SpongeBob SquarePants Movie soundtrack)
- 2008 – "Mad Pursuit" (Junkie XL featuring Electrocute) (on 21 soundtrack & FIFA 09)
- 2021 – "Celebrate Tonight" (in season 1, episode 2 of the Netflix show Guida astrologica per cuori infranti)
- 2022 – "I Don't Wanna Grow Up" (in season 2, episode 2 of the Netflix show Guida astrologica per cuori infranti)
