= ECW: Extreme Music =

Compilation album by various artists
- Released: October 27, 1998
- Genre: Heavy metal
- Length: 48:33
- Labels: CMC International; Sanctuary

ECW: Extreme Music is a compilation album of songs related to Extreme Championship Wrestling during the mid-late 1990s. The album was released in 1998 through CMC International. The executive producer was Bob Chiappardi of Concrete Marketing.

All songs were performed by professional musicians. Additionally, many of the songs were covers.

The album cover features professional wrestler James Fullington, known by his ring name, The Sandman. Each track also had a short introduction in the CD booklet by a different selected wrestler, some who had the tracks specially selected for them.

== Track listing ==
No.	Title	Artist	Length
1.	"This Is Extreme!" (ECW Theme)	Harry Slash & The Slashtones	2:30
2.	"El Phantasmo and the Chicken-Run Blast-O-Rama" (Wine, Women & Song Mix; Lance Storm Theme)	White Zombie	3:58
3.	"Walk" (Rob Van Dam Theme)	Kilgore (originally performed by Pantera)	4:58
4.	"Trust" (ECW Instrumental Mix; Jerry Lynn Theme)	Megadeth	5:28
5.	"The Zoo" (Bam Bam Bigelow Theme)	Bruce Dickinson and Roy Z (originally performed by Scorpions)	6:07
6.	"Enter Sandman" (The Sandman Theme)	Motörhead and Zebrahead (originally performed by Metallica)	5:14
7.	"Snap Your Fingers, Snap Your Neck" (Justin Credible Theme)	Grinspoon (originally performed by Prong)	4:27
8.	"Phantom Lord" (Mike Awesome Theme)	Anthrax (originally performed by Metallica)	4:30
9.	"Heard It on the X" (Francine Theme)	Tres Diablos featuring Dimebag Darrell, Rex, and Vinnie Paul (originally performed by ZZ Top)	2:54
10.	"Kick Out the Jams" (clean edit; Axl Rotten Theme)	Monster Magnet (originally performed by MC5)	2:35
11.	"Big Balls" (Balls Mahoney Theme)	Muscadine (originally performed by AC/DC)	2:56
12.	"Huka Blues" (Sabu Theme)	Harry Slash & The Slashtones	2:51

== Personnel ==
- Executive producer: Bob Chiappardi
- Associate producers: Jeff Sipler and Eric Pascal
- Project manager: Russ Gerroir
- Project attorney: Joe Serling and Wayne Rooks
- Mastered at: Sterling Sound
- Art direction: Randy Roberts and Ofer Ravid
- Photographer: Mark Weiss

== See also ==
- Music in professional wrestling
