= Will Schaefer =

American musician (1928–2007)

Willis H. Schaefer (November 23, 1928 – June 30, 2007) was an American composer nominated for an Emmy Award for his work. He wrote background music for a number of popular television shows and composed over 700 commercials. His most famous track, “Fight! Fight! Fight!” was used in The SpongeBob SquarePants Movie as the backing track to "Now That We're Men."

== Early life and career ==
Schaefer was born in Kenosha, Wisconsin in 1928. His father, Helmut Schaefer, was a founder of the Kenosha Symphony Orchestra. Schaefer was educated at Mary D. Bradford High School in Kenosha, De Paul University (B.M.), and Northwestern University (M.A. and some work toward a Doctor of Music degree).

His first credits as a film and television composer date from 1948. He served during the Korean War with the United States Fifth Army Band as an arranger and assistant conductor writing music for Radio Free Europe and the Voice of America.

== Composer and arranger ==
Schaefer returned to composing themes for television after the Korean War with Gunsmoke and The Phil Silvers Show. In following decades, he would compose background music for many popular television programs including I Dream of Jeannie, The Flintstones, The Flying Nun, Hogan's Heroes, The Jetsons and The Tonight Show Starring Johnny Carson.

Schaefer arranged and recorded music for over 700 commercials winning three Clio Awards. He also helped arrange music for the It's a Small World ride for Disney. In 1978, his work on the Disney TV movie The Skytrap was nominated for an Emmy for best score.

His last credited work was the track "Now That We're Men" on The SpongeBob SquarePants Movie soundtrack of 2004. (The music is his APM cue "Fight! Fight! Fight! (a)"). He died of cancer in a nursing home in Cathedral City near Palm Springs, California.
