= Vulgar Video =

Video (VHS) by Pantera
- Released: November 16, 1993
- Recorded: 1990–1993
- Genre: Groove metal
- Length: 72 minutes
- Label: Warner Music Vision
- Director: Graham Dent
- Producer: Pantera

Pantera chronology
Cowboys from Hell: The Videos (1991)	Vulgar Video (1993)	3 Watch It Go (1997)

Vulgar Video is the second home video (not counting the self released Hot 'n Heavy Home Vid) by American heavy metal band Pantera. It was released on VHS on November 16, 1993.

== Content ==
Vulgar Video is a chronicle of Pantera's 1992 tour, behind the Vulgar Display of Power studio album, that shows all of the band's excesses with groupies, drinking and drugs, as well as backstage footage. It also contains a total of six music videos. Members of Alice in Chains, White Zombie, Megadeth, and Metallica make guest appearances.

Vulgar Video, along with the two other home video releases of the band, was included on the 3 Vulgar Videos from Hell DVD in 2000 and then re-released in 2006 with better DVD features.

=== Track listing ===
- "Walk"
- "Domination" (live at the 1991 Monsters in Moscow festival)
- "Primal Concrete Sledge" (live at the 1991 Monsters in Moscow festival)
- "Cold Gin" (KISS cover, performed live with Skid Row)
- "This Love"
- "Mouth for War"

== Personnel ==
- Phil Anselmo – vocals
- Rex Brown – bass
- Dimebag Darrell – guitar
- Vinnie Paul – drums

== Certifications ==
Region	Certification	Certified units/sales
United States (RIAA)	Platinum	100,000^{^}
^{^} Shipments figures based on certification alone.

== See also ==
- Pantera video albums
