= Hostile Moments =

EP by Pantera
- Released: 1994
- Genre: Groove metal
- Label: Atco
- Producers: Terry Date; Vinnie Paul

Pantera chronology
Walk Cervical (1993)	Hostile Moments (1994)	Far Beyond Driven (1994)

Hostile Moments is the third EP by American heavy metal band Pantera, released in 1994. It is a 12" vinyl-only release.

== Content ==
The EP contains four tracks, including "I'm Broken", "Mouth for War"", Walk (Cervical Mix)", and "Fucking Hostile (Biomechanical Mix)".

Track one is from the (then) forthcoming album Far Beyond Driven, track two is from Vulgar Display of Power, and tracks three and four are remixes.

The gatefold vinyl contains a large black and white picture of Phil Anselmo's 'Unscarred' stomach tattoo, with the lyrics from "I'm Broken" in silver writing covering the picture.

== Track listing ==
All tracks written by Pantera.

1. "I'm Broken"
2. "Mouth for War"
3. "Walk (Cervical Mix)"
4. "Fucking Hostile (Biomechanical Mix)"

== Personnel ==
Pantera

- Phil Anselmo – vocals
- Rex Brown – bass
- "Dimebag" Darrell – guitar
- Vinnie Paul – drums

Other

- JG Thirlwell – remix (track 3)
- Justin Broadrick – remix (track 4)
- Produced, engineered and mixed by Terry Date and Vinnie Paul.
- Co-produced by Pantera
- "Walk (Cervical Mix)" remixed at 'Powerplay'. Remix engineer: Rob Sutton. Assistant: Alex Armitage.
- "Fucking Hostile (Biomechanical Mix)" remixed at 'Avalanche Studios', Birmingham, England.
- Front cover photo by Joe Giron.
