= SpongeBob SquarePants: Original Theme Highlights =

EP by SpongeBob SquarePants
- Released: August 14, 2001
- Recorded: 1998–2001
- Genre: Bubblegum pop; country; surf rock; garage rock; soundtrack; groove metal
- Length: 9:09
- Label: Nick Records, Jive Records

SpongeBob SquarePants chronology
SpongeBob SquarePants: Original Theme Highlights (2001)	The SpongeBob SquarePants Movie – Music from the Movie and More... (2004)

Professional ratings
Review scores
Source	Rating
AllMusic	3/5 stars

SpongeBob SquarePants: Original Theme Highlights is the debut album of songs played on the Nickelodeon TV series SpongeBob SquarePants. It includes tracks sung by the cartoon's characters: SpongeBob SquarePants, Sandy Cheeks, Patrick Star, Squidward Tentacles, and Plankton. Its total running time is 9 minutes and 12 seconds, spanning seven tracks. This soundtrack was released on August 14, 2001 on CD by Nick Records, and Jive Records in the US.

The track "Pre-Hibernation" is an edited version of "Death Rattle" which was featured on Pantera's album, Reinventing the Steel.

== Track listing ==
No.	Title	Length
1.	"SpongeBob SquarePants Theme" (Painty the Pirate & Kids)	0:46
2.	"Loop de Loop" (Ween)	1:01
3.	"Texas Song" (Junior Brown and Sandy Cheeks)	1:58
4.	"Pre-Hibernation (Instrumental)" (Pantera)	1:29
5.	"Ripped Pants" (SpongeBob and the Losers)	1:17
6.	"F.U.N. Song" (SpongeBob and Plankton)	1:41
7.	"SpongeBob ScaredyPants" (The Ghastly Ones)	1:00
Total length:		9:12
