= Cowboys from Hell: The Videos =

Video (VHS) by Pantera
- Released: April 2, 1991
- Recorded: 1990–?
- Genre: Groove metal
- Length: 45 minutes
- Label: Warner Music Vision
- Director: Pantera
- Producer: Pantera

Pantera chronology
| Cowboys from Hell: The Videos (1991) | Vulgar Video (1993) |

Cowboys from Hell: The Videos is the first home video (not counting the self released Hot 'n Heavy Home Vid) by American heavy metal band Pantera. It was released on VHS on April 2, 1991.

== Content ==
Cowboys from Hell: The Videos is a documentary of Pantera's Cowboys from Hell tour, that shows the group drinking and partying, as well as backstage footage. It also contains a total of six music videos. Members from bands like Alice in Chains, Judas Priest, and Slayer make guest appearances.

Cowboys from Hell: The Videos, along with the two other home videos by the band, was released on the 3 Vulgar Videos from Hell DVD in 2000 and then re-released in 2006 with better DVD features.

=== Track listing ===
(Source:)

- "Cowboys from Hell"
- "Psycho Holiday"
- "Cemetery Gates"
- "Mouth for War"
- "Heresy"^{1}
- "The Art of Shredding"^{1}

1. Live at the 1990 Foundations Forum convention in Los Angeles.

== Personnel ==
- Phil Anselmo – vocals
- Rex Brown – bass
- Dimebag Darrell – guitar
- Vinnie Paul – drums

== Certifications ==
| Region | Certification | Certified units/sales |
|---|---|---|
| United States (RIAA) | Gold | 50,000^{^} |
^{^} Shipments figures based on certification alone.

== See also ==
- Pantera video albums
