= Where You Come From =

Where You Come From may refer to:

- "Where You Come From", a 2018 song by Disclosure
- "Where You Come From", a song by DJ Khaled from his 2021 album Khaled Khaled
- "Where You Come From", a song by Pantera from their 1997 album Official Live: 101 Proof
