= I'll Cast a Shadow =

2000 single by Pantera

Promotional single by Pantera

from the album Reinventing the Steel
- Released: June 16, 2000
- Recorded: 2000
- Genre: Groove metal
- Length: 5:22
- Label: East West
- Songwriter(s): Dimebag Darrell; Vinnie Paul; Phil Anselmo; Rex Brown
- Producer(s): Pantera; Mark Whitfield

Pantera singles chronology
"Goddamn Electric" (2000)	"I'll Cast a Shadow" (2000)	"Piss" (2012)

"I'll Cast a Shadow" is a song by American heavy metal band Pantera from their 2000 album Reinventing the Steel, and is the final track on the album. The song is the final single to be released by the group before their breakup until their reformation in 2022, and also the last single to feature guitarist Dimebag Darrell and drummer Vinnie Paul before their deaths in 2004 and 2018 respectively. The song is about the influence the band had on the heavy metal genre.

== Reception ==
Metal Hammer ranked "I'll Cast a Shadow" No. 43 on their list of the 50 best Pantera songs, writing: "A grand and belligerent way for Pantera to bow out, this brooding paean to rising from the ashes now seems unbearably poignant: 'When I die, I cast a shadow / And I'll rise, I cast a shadow'. For all their fire and fury, this band had the souls of poets, too."

== Charts ==
Chart (2000)	Peak position
UK Rock Songs	15
