= The Singles 1991–1996 =

Box set by Pantera
- Released: September 23, 1996
- Genre: Groove metal
- Length: 109:32
- Label: WEA Australia
- Producer: Terry Date; Vinnie Paul

Pantera chronology
The Great Southern Trendkill (1996)	The Singles 1991–1996 (1996)	Official Live: 101 Proof (1997)

The Singles 1991–1996 is a box set containing six CD singles by the band Pantera that was released on September 23, 1996, in Australia only.

== Content ==
The box set contains six CDs, all presented in a cardboard box.

As this was only released in Australia and was limited edition, this set has become out of print and sought after among Pantera fans worldwide. The collection typically sells for $50–$100 on sites like eBay and Amazon.

== Track listing ==
=== "I'm Broken" ===
- All tracks by Pantera unless noted otherwise.
1. "I'm Broken" – 04:25
2. "Slaughtered" – 03:57
3. "Domination" (live) – 06:34
4. "Primal Concrete Sledge" (live) – 03:57
- NOTE: Tracks three and four were recorded live in Moscow on September 28, 1991, at Monsters of Rock.

=== "5 Minutes Alone" ===
1. "5 Minutes Alone" – 05:49
2. "The Badge" (Poison Idea cover) – 03:56
3. "Cemetery Gates" – 07:02

=== "Mouth for War" ===
1. "Mouth for War" – 03:57
2. "Rise" – 04:37
3. "Cowboys from Hell" (live) – 04:16
4. "Heresy" (live) – 05:05

=== "Walk" ===
1. "Walk" – 05:16
2. "A New Level" – 03:59
3. "Walk" (Cervical dub extended) – 06:41
4. "Walk" (Cervical edit) – 05:10

=== "Planet Caravan" part one ===
1. "Planet Caravan" (Ozzy Osbourne, Tony Iommi, Geezer Butler, Bill Ward) – 4:03
2. "The Badge" (Poison Idea cover) – 03:57
3. "A New Level" (live) – 05:43
4. "Becoming" (live) – 04:05
- NOTE: Tracks three and four were recorded live at the Brixton Academy in London, England on September 12, 1994.

=== "Planet Caravan" part two ===
1. "Planet Caravan" (Ozzy Osbourne, Tony Iommi, Geezer Butler, Bill Ward) – 4:03
2. "By Demons Be Driven" (Biomechanical mix) – 04:18
3. "Heresy" (live) – 05:00
4. "Cowboys from Hell" (live) – 05:08

== Personnel ==
- Phil Anselmo – vocals
- Rex Brown – bass
- "Dimebag" Darrell – guitar
- Vinnie Paul – drums

== Chart positions ==
Chart (1996)	Peak position
Australian Albums Chart	40
