= Reinventing the Steel =

Studio album by Pantera
- Released: March 21, 2000
- Recorded: 1999–2000
- Studios: Chasin Jason Studios, Arlington, Texas
- Genre: Groove metal
- Length: 43:53
- Labels: Elektra; East West
- Producers: Dimebag Darrell; Vinnie Paul; Sterling Winfield

Pantera chronology
Official Live: 101 Proof (1997)	Reinventing the Steel (2000)	The Best of Pantera: Far Beyond the Great Southern Cowboys' Vulgar Hits! (2003)

Pantera studio album chronology
The Great Southern Trendkill (1996)	Reinventing the Steel (2000)

Singles from Reinventing the Steel
- 1. "Revolution Is My Name" Released: January 23, 2000; 2. "Hole in the Sky" Released: November 21, 2000 (Japan)

Reinventing the Steel is the ninth and final studio album by American heavy metal band Pantera, released on March 21, 2000, March 27 in the UK and April 5 in Japan, through Elektra Records and East West Records. This was the last studio album Pantera released before their 19 year breakup from November 2003 to July 2022. Further, it is the band's final album to feature the Abbott brothers Dimebag Darrell and Vinnie Paul before their deaths in 2004 and 2018, respectively.

The album was released at a time of intense strife for the band, especially as Phil Anselmo's heroin addiction escalated into a near-fatal overdose in 1996. After the release of this album, the band would fracture and eventually split due to these tensions and Anselmo's pursuance of side projects.

Reinventing the Steel received positive reviews, although critically and commercially, it was not as successful as their previous albums, becoming Pantera's only major label album to not be certified platinum.

== Background ==
After the release of The Great Southern Trendkill, Pantera was experiencing an intense period of strife between its members. Singer Phil Anselmo had developed a heroin addiction to cope with back pain, which eventually escalated into an overdose while on tour with Eyehategod and White Zombie, which would leave him legally dead for 5 minutes before being revived. Additionally, by this point he was pursuing more side projects and Pantera became less of a focus for Anselmo.

Reinventing the Steel was produced by the Abbott brothers in addition to Sterling Winfield, making it Pantera's first studio album since 1988's Power Metal not to be produced by Terry Date.

Unlike other Pantera releases, two B-sides were recorded during the Reinventing the Steel sessions. The B-sides are "Avoid the Light" and "Immortally Insane", found on the Dracula 2000 and Heavy Metal 2000, and the Texas Chainsaw Massacre soundtracks, respectively.

== Musical style ==
Reinventing the Steel contains lyrics mostly about the band itself, as on "We'll Grind that Axe for a Long Time" (where the band members tell about how they have kept it "true" throughout the years, while many of their peers "sucked up for the fame") and "I'll Cast a Shadow" (about Pantera's influence on the genre). There are also songs about their fans, like "Goddamn Electric" and "You've Got to Belong to It". "Goddamn Electric" mentions Black Sabbath and Slayer, two of Pantera's main influences. The solo for "Goddamn Electric" was recorded by Kerry King in a bathroom after Slayer performed at Ozzfest in Dallas on July 13, 1999. The band members dedicated Reinventing the Steel to their fans who they viewed as their "brothers and sisters".

== Artwork ==
The cover art is by Scott Caliva (1967–2003), a friend of Pantera lead singer Phil Anselmo. Caliva took the photo of a partygoer at Anselmo's house jumping through a bonfire clutching a bottle of Wild Turkey bourbon whiskey. The bottle is pixelated on the cover so the label would not be visible, to avoid trademark infringement.

The 20th Anniversary Edition cover art was only made with the steel marking background, along with the logo and the album name similar to their 1990 album, Cowboys from Hell.

== Release ==
The album was released on March 21, 2000 by Elektra Records and East West Records. In Australia, a two-disc "Tour Edition" of the album was released as well. The first disc consists of the album proper while the second is an unofficial hits compilation.

The album was reissued on October 20, 2020, with extra discs including a new mix by Date and unreleased tracks to honor the album's 20th anniversary.

=== Commercial performance ===
Reinventing the Steel debuted at number four on the Billboard 200 and number five on the Top Internet Albums, selling 161,105 copies in its first week of release according to Nielsen Soundscan. On its second week, it fell to number 24, selling only 59,962 copies, a 62.8% drop in sales. In total, the album only appeared on that chart for 12 weeks. On May 2, the album was certified gold by the Recording Industry Association of America (RIAA), denoting 500,000 units sold. However, it has yet to reach platinum status, making it Pantera's only major-label studio album not to reach sales of 1,000,000. According to Nielsen SoundScan, the album has sold 593,000 copies domestically as of October 2003. It also debuted at number eight on the Top Canadian Albums chart.

In a 2022 interview with Gibson TV, Rex Brown blamed the album's lacklustre success compared to the band's previous albums on the dominance of the nu metal genre at the time of its release.

== Reception ==
Professional ratings
Review scores
Source	Rating
AllMusic	3/5 stars
Alternative Press	5/5 stars
The Austin Chronicle	2/5 stars
Blabbermouth.net	8/10
Chronicles of Chaos	7/10
Entertainment Weekly	B+
NME	6/10
Q	3/5 stars
Robert Christgau	(dud)
Rolling Stone	3.5/5 stars

The album was generally well received upon release, though reviews were less enthusiastic than on their previous albums. Rolling Stone gave the album a score of 3.5/5, and called it "Metal-revivalist....relying on the genre's primal elements of rage and analog noise...chopped up with squealing dissonance....brutal enough to please underground purists and familiar enough for weekend headbangers." Entertainment Weekly stated that it "...resumes their scorched-earth policy with vigor....dropping aural anvils [along] with a dash of inventiveness..."

Q magazine gave it 3 out of 5 stars and said it was "Pantera's attempt to upgrade [Judas Priest's] British Steel-era pure metal spirit." Alternative Press echoed this sentiment, calling it "An undiluted, unvarnished slab of riffs paying distinct homage to Judas Priest's British Steel, and not just in a titular sense, but in basic song construction." AllMusic reviewer Steve Huey gave the album 3 out of 5 stars, and stated "Reinventing the Steel is a nonstop assault on the senses, offering no respite from the intensity until the album has stopped playing. Yet somehow, it comes off as a cut below their best albums; perhaps it's that the band's sound lacks the sense of freshness that sparked Cowboys from Hell, Vulgar Display of Power, and Far Beyond Driven."

Singer Phil Anselmo named Reinventing the Steel as his favorite Pantera album.

=== Accolades ===
In the 2000 Metal Edge Readers' Choice Awards, the album was voted "Album of the Year" and "Album Cover of the Year" (tying with Iron Maiden's Brave New World for the latter), while the single "Revolution Is My Name" won "Song of the Year".

"Revolution Is My Name" was nominated for a Grammy Award for Best Metal Performance in 2001, but lost to Deftones' "Elite".

The album was ranked at No. 2 on Guitar World's Readers Poll for "The Top 10 Guitar Albums of 2000".

== 20th anniversary edition ==
A three-disc 20th anniversary set was released on October 20, 2020. It features remixes of the original tracklist by longtime Pantera producer Terry Date, singles that were previously not released on any studio album, radio edits of album tracks, and instrumental rough mixes of the album's original tracks.

== In other media ==
A section of "Death Rattle" was re-recorded and renamed to "Pre-Hibernation" for the SpongeBob SquarePants episode "Pre-Hibernation Week". The song appears in the SpongeBob SquarePants: Original Theme Highlights album.

== Track listing ==
All credits adapted from the original CD issue.

All tracks are written by Pantera.

No.	Title	Length
1.	"Hellbound"	2:41
2.	"Goddamn Electric" (featuring Kerry King)	4:56
3.	"Yesterday Don't Mean Shit"	4:19
4.	"You've Got to Belong to It"	4:13
5.	"Revolution Is My Name"	5:15
6.	"Death Rattle"	3:17
7.	"We'll Grind That Axe for a Long Time"	3:44
8.	"Uplift"	3:45
9.	"It Makes Them Disappear"	6:21
10.	"I'll Cast a Shadow"	5:22
Total length:		43:53

Japanese edition bonus track
No.	Title	Length
11.	"Hole in the Sky" (Black Sabbath cover)	4:17
Total length:		48:10

=== 20th anniversary edition ===
All tracks are written by Pantera (except where noted).

Disc one
No.	Title	Length
1.	"Hellbound (2020 Terry Date Mix)"	2:41
2.	"Goddamn Electric (2020 Terry Date Mix)"	4:56
3.	"Yesterday Don't Mean Shit (2020 Terry Date Mix)"	4:19
4.	"You've Got to Belong to It (2020 Terry Date Mix)"	4:13
5.	"Revolution Is My Name (2020 Terry Date Mix)"	5:15
6.	"Death Rattle (2020 Terry Date Mix)"	3:17
7.	"We'll Grind That Axe for a Long Time (2020 Terry Date Mix)"	3:44
8.	"Uplift (2020 Terry Date Mix)"	3:45
9.	"It Makes Them Disappear (2020 Terry Date Mix)"	6:21
10.	"I'll Cast a Shadow (2020 Terry Date Mix)"	5:22

Disc two
No.	Title	Length
1.	"Hellbound (2020 Remaster)"	2:41
2.	"Goddamn Electric (2020 Remaster)"	4:56
3.	"Yesterday Don't Mean Shit (2020 Remaster)"	4:19
4.	"You've Got to Belong to It (2020 Remaster)"	4:13
5.	"Revolution Is My Name (2020 Remaster)"	5:15
6.	"Death Rattle (2020 Remaster)"	3:17
7.	"We'll Grind That Axe for a Long Time (2020 Remaster)"	3:44
8.	"Uplift (2020 Remaster)"	3:45
9.	"It Makes Them Disappear (2020 Remaster)"	6:21
10.	"I'll Cast a Shadow (2020 Remaster)"	5:22
11.	"Goddamn Electric (Radio Mix)"	4:57
12.	"Revolution Is My Name (Radio Edit) (2020 Remaster)"	4:10
13.	"I'll Cast a Shadow (Radio Edit)"	3:55
14.	"Goddamn Electric (Radio Edit)"	4:14

Disc three
No.	Title	Music	Length
1.	"Avoid the Light"		6:27
2.	"Immortally Insane"		5:11
3.	"Cat Scratch Fever"	Ted Nugent	3:49
4.	"Hole in the Sky"	Black Sabbath	4:13
5.	"Electric Funeral"	Black Sabbath	5:43
6.	"Hellbound (Instrumental Rough Mix)"		2:41
7.	"Goddamn Electric (Instrumental Rough Mix)"		4:56
8.	"Yesterday Don't Mean Shit (Instrumental Rough Mix)"		4:19
9.	"You've Got to Belong to It (Instrumental Rough Mix)"		4:13
10.	"Revolution Is My Name (Instrumental Rough Mix)"		5:15
11.	"Death Rattle (Instrumental Rough Mix)"		3:17
12.	"We'll Grind That Axe for a Long Time (Instrumental Rough Mix)"		3:44
13.	"Uplift (Instrumental Rough Mix)"		3:45
14.	"It Makes Them Disappear (Instrumental Rough Mix)"		6:21
15.	"I'll Cast a Shadow (Instrumental Rough Mix)"		5:22
Total length:			172:56

== Personnel ==
Pantera

- Phil Anselmo – vocals
- Dimebag Darrell – guitars
- Rex Brown – bass guitar
- Vinnie Paul – drums

Additional personnel

- Kerry King – outro guitar on "Goddamn Electric"

Technical personnel

- Sterling Winfield – production, engineering, mixing
- Vinnie Paul – production, engineering, mixing
- Dimebag Darrell – production
- Howie Weinberg – mastering at Masterdisk, New York
- Recorded at Chasin Jason Studios, Arlington, Texas

== Charts ==
Chart (2000)	Peak position
Australian Albums (ARIA)	2
Austrian Albums (Ö3 Austria)	26
Canadian Albums (Billboard)	8
Dutch Albums (Album Top 100)	55
Finnish Albums (Suomen virallinen lista)	3
French Albums (SNEP)	21
German Albums (Offizielle Top 100)	18
Hungarian Albums (MAHASZ)	12
Irish Albums (IRMA)	31
Italian Albums (Musica e Dischi)	33
Japanese Albums (Oricon)	40
New Zealand Albums (RMNZ)	10
Norwegian Albums (VG-lista)	14
Scottish Albums (Official Charts)	43
Swedish Albums (Sverigetopplistan)	27
Swiss Albums (Schweizer Hitparade)	84
UK Albums (Official Charts)	33
UK Rock & Metal Albums (Official Charts)	1
US Billboard 200	4

== Certifications ==
Region	Certification	Certified units/sales
United States (RIAA)	Gold	593,000
