= Psycho Holiday =

Single by Pantera

from the album Cowboys from Hell
- Released: July 24, 1990
- Recorded: 1990
- Genre: Groove metal
- Length: 5:19
- Label: Atco
- Songwriters: Dimebag Darrell; Vinnie Paul; Phil Anselmo; Rex Brown
- Producer: Terry Date

Pantera singles chronology
"Cowboys from Hell" (1990)	"Psycho Holiday" (1990)	"Mouth for War" (1992)

"Psycho Holiday" is a song by the American heavy metal band Pantera, released as the second and final single their fifth studio album, Cowboys from Hell (1990).

== Composition ==
"Psycho Holiday" is an early example of Pantera's groove metal sound, but also features the last traces of the band's glam metal past, including high-pitched vocals, squealing guitars and big choruses. Written in the key of F-sharp major, the song has a moderate tempo of 102 beats per minute. Phil Anselmo's voice ranges in pitch from G4 to F6.

== Music video ==
A video was made for the song, released on the 1991 VHS Cowboys from Hell: The Videos. It was later re-released on the 1999 DVD 3 Vulgar Videos from Hell. The video was directed by Paul Rachman.

== Reception ==
Malcolm Dome of Metal Hammer considered "Psycho Holiday" to be one of the ten best Pantera songs, writing that the band proved they could be melodic, nasty and musically simple but creative. Dom Lawson, also of Metal Hammer, ranked it the 26th-best Pantera song, calling it an "unhinged classic".

AllMusic writer Eduardo Rivadavia considered "Psycho Holiday" to be one of the three highlights from the album.

== Track listing ==
1. "Psycho Holiday" – 5:19
2. "Cowboys from Hell" (live) – 4:07
3. "Heresy" (live) – 4:48

== Personnel ==
- Phil Anselmo – vocals
- Diamond Darrell – guitar
- Rex Brown – bass
- Vinnie Paul – drums

== In popular culture ==
"Psycho Holiday" was mentioned in the Cherrie Lynn book Unleashed. In the video game WWF WrestleMania 2000, the menu theme seems to emulate the song.
