= SpongeBob SquarePants Theme =

Theme to SpongeBob SquarePants by Mark Harrison and Blaise Smith

Song by Painty the Pirate and SpongeBob SquarePants chorus
- Released: May 1, 1999
- Genre: Sea shanty
- Length: 0:44
- Composers: Blaise Smith; Mark Harrison
- Lyricists: Derek Drymon; Stephen Hillenburg

Audio sample
- file; help

"SpongeBob SquarePants Theme" is the theme song to the animated television series SpongeBob SquarePants. It was composed by musicians Blaise Smith and Mark Harrison, with lyrics by the series' creator, Stephen Hillenburg, and creative director, Derek Drymon. It is performed by Painty the Pirate—a painting of a pirate with a superimposed mouth voiced by Patrick Pinney—and a chorus of children. The song is a sea shanty, inspired by "Blow the Man Down", and it features a call and response between Painty and the chorus. The series has gained popularity since its debut in 1999, and its theme song became widely recognized among Millennials and Generation Z.

The SpongeBob SquarePants franchise has featured cover versions of the theme song by Avril Lavigne in The SpongeBob SquarePants Movie (2004) and by CeeLo Green in Truth or Square (2009). Artists who have performed the song in concerts include Tom Kenny, who plays the show's titular character, and Corey Taylor. The song has inspired multiple viral phenomena and been used as the walk-up music for baseball player Oscar González.

== Background and composition ==
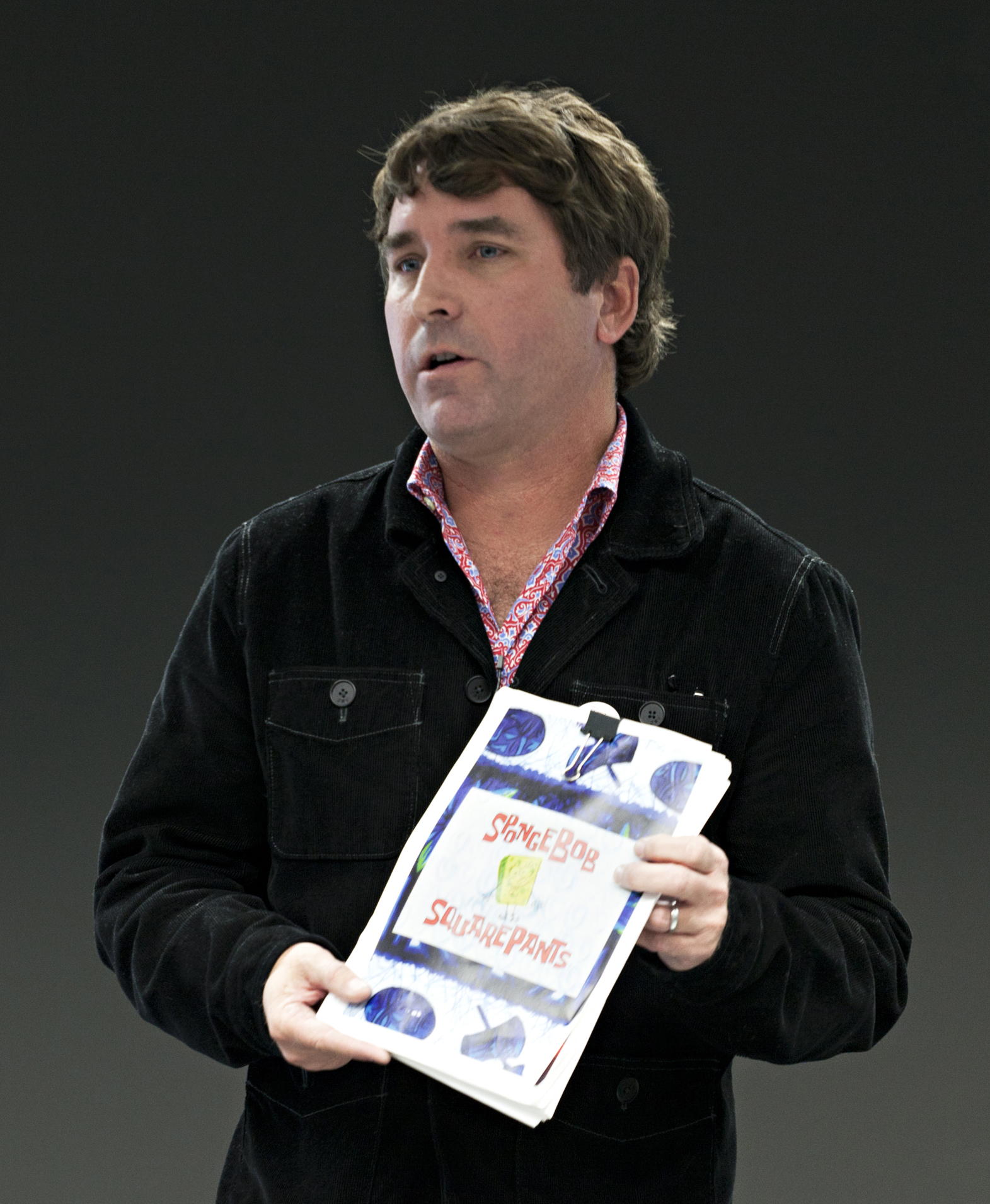
Stephen Hillenburg co-wrote the theme song.

SpongeBob SquarePants is an animated television series that debuted on Nickelodeon on May 1, 1999. It was created by Stephen Hillenburg, an animator and former marine biologist. The series is about the titular character, a sponge, and other marine animals who inhabit Bikini Bottom. SpongeBob SquarePants became Nickelodeon's longest-running series and sparked a franchise that includes multiple movies.

The theme song was composed by Mark Harrison and Blaise Smith, with the melody adapted from a sea shanty titled "Blow the Man Down". Its lyrics were written by Hillenburg and Derek Drymon, the series's creative director, who had previously worked as an animator on Hillenburg's series Rocko's Modern Life. Drymon later said in a DVD commentary, "Steve's idea was to try to make the most annoying song you can, to—so when Saturday morning, [sic?] when kids turn the TV on and parents are trying to sleep, you have this pirate screaming in the other room for the kids to jump on the floor."

== Music and opening sequence ==
Painty the Pirate as he appears at the start of the opening sequence

Stylistically, the SpongeBob SquarePants theme song is a sea shanty. It is performed by the character of Painty the Pirate, voiced by Patrick Pinney, and a chorus of children. Pinney had no other roles in the series. Several people have claimed to voice the children, including the child of animator Tuck Tucker.

The pirate introduces the song by saying, "Are ya ready, kids?" before starting a lyrical call and response with the children, and it ends with the chorus repeatedly singing the show's title. The first lyrics describe the titular character:

Who lives in a pineapple under the sea?
SpongeBob SquarePants!
Absorbent and yellow and porous is he!
SpongeBob SquarePants!

The opening sequence shows Painty the Pirate as an oil painting of a pirate, inspired by an item Hillenburg had found at a thrift store. Hillenburg's mouth is superimposed on the painting, lip syncing to the opening words. This is followed by a live action image above the water before transitioning to animation. This was filmed in a pool owned by Genndy Tartakovsky.

== In official media ==
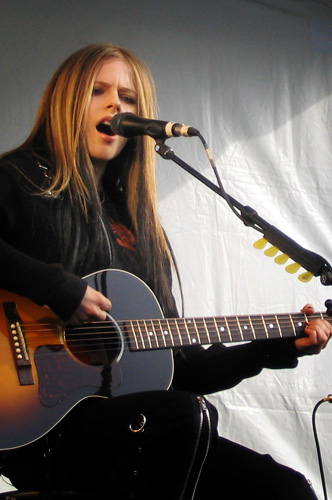
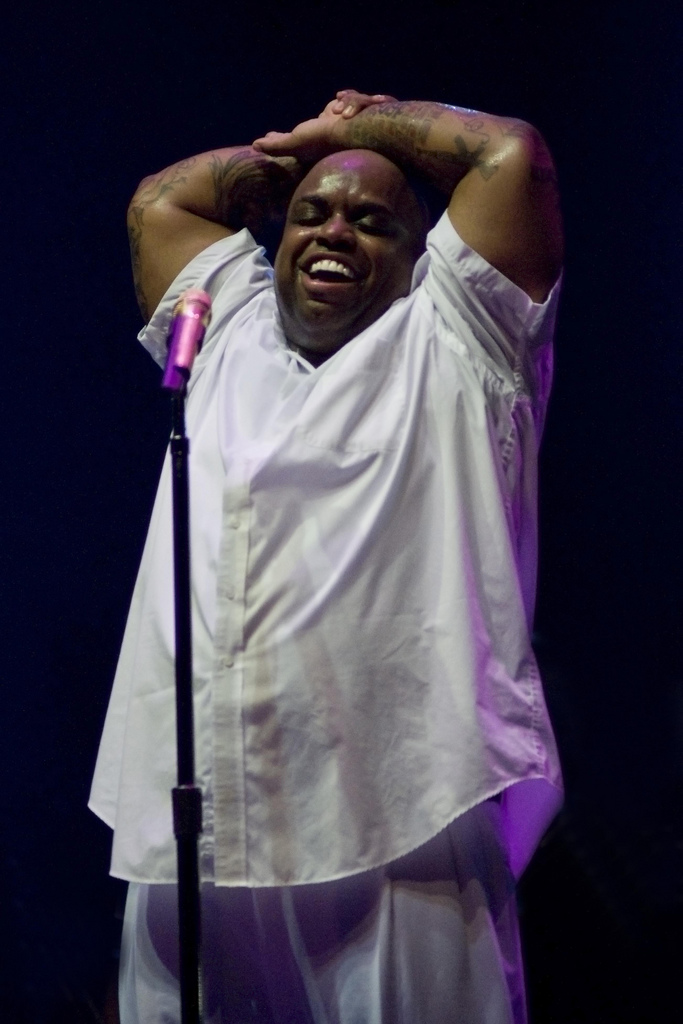
Avril Lavigne (left) and CeeLo Green have covered the theme song in official media.

A cover of the song by Avril Lavigne was the first song in the soundtrack album of The SpongeBob SquarePants Movie, released in 2004. An album review by Pitchfork's David Moore called her version "pretty excruciating". The series's tenth anniversary special, Truth or Square, released in 2009, featured a cover by CeeLo Green over a stop-motion opening sequence. SpongeBob SquarePants: The Broadway Musical includes the theme song as its final number. The 2020 film The SpongeBob Movie: Sponge on the Run featured the song "Agua" by Tainy and J Balvin, which interpolates the theme song, including the part in which SpongeBob plays his nose as a flute. The cast of the series recorded a version of the song ahead of a virtual table read the same year.

== Reception and legacy ==
The song became popular alongside its series. It was described by Ultimate Guitar's Justin Beckner as "perhaps the most famous part of the show" and by American Songwriter's Tina Benitez-Eves as "one of the most iconic animated openings". Rolling Stone listed it as number 42 on its list of "Best TV Theme Songs of All Time", with Tatiana Krisztina calling it a "perfect introduction". Krisztina, as well as Reactor Magazine's Cole Rush, wrote that the line "Are ya ready, kids?" universally elicited a response among millennials. Rapper T-Pain negatively reviewed the song in a TikTok video, saying that the chorus's amelodic screaming "[ruined] the song".

Tom Kenny, who voices SpongeBob, has performed the theme song at several concerts with his band Tom Kenny and the Hi-Seas. Heavy metal vocalist Corey Taylor has performed the song at solo shows, first performing it as an encore in 2011 in Orlando. He said in 2020, "It drives me nuts that it's one of the most requested songs at my acoustic shows, and yet the whole reason I learned that song was so me and my son could connect on music." He performed it with Tom Kenny and the Hi-Seas at the 2023 Huntington Comic and Toy Convention, in Huntington, West Virginia. Kenny introduced Taylor, who said it was "the most nervous I've ever been in my whole career" before starting the improvised duet. Rolling Stone said it was Taylor's "peak". Rapper Machine Gun Kelly performed a live vocal version of the song in 2021, which Exclaim! called "unspeakably bad".

In a 2013 interview with The New York Times, Hillenburg mentioned a video of Russian Ground Forces members marching to the song. Viral phenomena that use the song include a 2019 halftime show by the Ohio State University Marching Band, a Yiddish translation by Judaic scholar Eddy Portnoy in 2022, and a 2022 metalcore version by TikTok musician Neil Schneider that mashed up the song with "Mistakes Like Fractures" by Knocked Loose. Baseball player Oscar González began using the song as his walk-up music playing for the Columbus Clippers in 2022, and continued after joining the Cleveland Guardians later that year. He explained that "kids love that song and this is a kid's game after all". His use of the song became popular among fans, and he gained the nickname "SpongeBob".

== Personnel ==
- Patrick Pinney – lead vocals
- Devin Johnson, Sara Paxton, Camryn Walling – vocals
- Stephen Hillenburg, Derek Drymon, Mark Harrison, Blaise Smith – songwriting
- Mike Crehore, Al Houghton – mastering
