= Far Beyond Driven =

Studio album by Pantera
- Released: March 21, 1994
- Recorded: 1993
- Studio: Abtrax Recording (Nashville, Tennessee)
- Genre: Groove metal
- Length: 56:19
- Labels: East West; Atlantic
- Producers: Terry Date; Vinnie Paul

Pantera chronology
Hostile Moments (1994)	Far Beyond Driven (1994)	The Great Southern Trendkill (1996)

Pantera studio album chronology
Vulgar Display of Power (1992)	Far Beyond Driven (1994)	The Great Southern Trendkill (1996)

Alternative cover
- Far Beyond Driven cover originally rejected by the record label. The cover was used for vinyl record releases.

Singles from Far Beyond Driven
- 1. "I'm Broken" Released: March 7, 1994; 2. "5 Minutes Alone" Released: May 29, 1994; 3. "Planet Caravan" Released: October 10, 1994

Far Beyond Driven is the seventh studio album by American heavy metal band Pantera, released on March 21, 1994 in the UK and March 22 internationally as the band's first album on East West Records. Far Beyond Driven is the first album by Pantera where the band's guitarist Darrell Abbott is credited as "Dimebag Darrell", having changed his nickname from "Diamond Darrell" soon after Vulgar Display of Power was released. The Japanese and the Driven Downunder Tour '94 Souvenir Collection editions contain a bonus thirteenth track, "The Badge", a Poison Idea cover. This cover was also featured on The Crow soundtrack.

Pantera's fastest-selling album, it peaked at number 1 on the Billboard 200 and was certified Platinum by the RIAA. The album was also certified Platinum by the Canadian Recording Industry Association. While not as acclaimed as their prior albums, it has still received widespread critical acclaim, and its first two singles, I'm Broken and 5 Minutes Alone are among the band's most popular and acclaimed songs.

== Background ==
In 1992, Pantera released their breakthrough album, Vulgar Display of Power. Despite the success of the album, the band experienced turmoil in the two years following its release. Vocalist Phil Anselmo was injured with ruptured discs in his back and suffered from chronic pain from degenerative disc disease. Anselmo began drinking heavily, abusing painkillers and muscle relaxants, and using heroin to alleviate the pain. Reflecting on that period during a 2014 interview, Anselmo recalled, "I think this is one of the first times in my life, man, that I had this thing called 'vulnerability' kick in, and that was a very uncomfortable feeling."

== Music and lyrics ==
The band tuned lower on the album than on previous efforts, with the song “Hard Lines, Sunken Cheeks” going as low as C♯ standard. Unlike the band's previous major-label albums, many of the songs, such as "5 Minutes Alone", feature double-tracked and layered vocals from singer Phil Anselmo. Several lyrical topics appear on Far Beyond Driven. The track "Good Friends and a Bottle of Pills" seems to be a reference to the song "Good Friends and a Bottle of Wine" on the Ted Nugent album Weekend Warriors. Anselmo said about the track:

"The lyrical content was me probably giving a nod to my fascination at the time with Nick Cave's Birthday Party. Nick Cave was a genius. I will say the lyrics tell a true story. I made a lot of mistakes as a youngster, and to reveal to this particular person who it was about, why it was about, what happened that particular night, would not be very kosher. I can't do it. To this day, I won't do it. It would just be in bad taste. At this point, I don't think that person would want five minutes alone with me, unless we have a sip of white wine."

Pantera's bassist Rex Brown said about "Good Friends and a Bottle of Pills":

"It was just kind of fucking around – Vinnie had a drumbeat, Dime was just fucking around with that pedal, and I had the five-string bass. ... We listened to it and at first, we went, 'What the fuck is that?' Then when Phil put the vocals on it, it just blew everybody's fucking minds. I don't know what the fuck he was thinking with the lyrics."

Phil Anselmo said about the song "Strength Beyond Strength":

"I was a rambunctious child. None of it is regrettable, lyrically. You can look back at your lyrics and snicker. I'll always do, whether I'm embarrassed over it, or whether I'm embarrassed over it, or whether I'm embarrassed over it. You can tell growing spurts and pains and where you were in life, so I don't know. Strength fucking Beyond Strength is the old puffin' the chest up, 'look at us now,' we're as cute as [we're] fucking extreme."

Speaking about the song "5 Minutes Alone", drummer Vinnie Paul said:

"The story behind this song is we were opening for Megadeth, and there was a guy that was flipping us off the whole show and so we stopped the show. And I was like, 'Listen, in case you haven't noticed there's 18,000 people who really dig what we're doing. You're the only one doing that stupid shit without even having to egg the crowd on.' Ten guys just jumped the guy and beat the shit out of him. His dad called the manager after all the lawsuits and this and that, and basically said, 'Give me five minutes with that Phil Anselmo guy. I want to whup his ass.'"

Anselmo explained the meaning behind the song "Becoming":

"The most popular heavy metal bands in the world at that time were, in my estimate and definitely all of our estimates, playing the game. ... They had reached this pinnacle; now they were kind of tapering off and writing more commercial stuff, whereas we realized our strong point, once again, was sticking to heavy metal and making it as heavy as our style would allow. Therefore, with 'Becoming,' it is what it says. We were becoming. Honestly, we had arrived."

Anselmo said about the song "Shedding Skin":

"'Shedding Skin' was about me being in my 20s and any girlfriend, lady-friend of mine trying to tie me down at that age, at that particular time. Basically, 'lay off, right now.' A relationship with me? A serious relationship with me at that age? Forget it, fuck off. Really, it's impossible."

Anselmo said about the song "Slaughtered":

"I've always had a distorted view of organized religion and I was never more confused than when I was in my 20s and whatnot. And still I like to use a fusion, if you will, of religions and fuck with them, so to speak. And then tear them down and piss all over them or build them up only to tip over."

Anselmo said about the song "Hard Lines, Sunken Cheeks":

"I think it was a foreshadowing of the fear that I felt of not being the same. ... I know for a fact, I guess, that I dabbled in pain pills and stuff like that because I was miserable, and that's always a friggin' dead end, dead road, a terrible path to take. But at the time, I didn't have any other answers."

The song "25 Years" is about Phil Anselmo's father. Anselmo later said:

"'25 Years' was written about my father. At the time [I] had a gigantic falling-out with him and I resented the fuck out of him and wrote a beautiful song about it. It was a time capsule of how far he and I had not come, and I think a lot of fans could relate with the dysfunctional family vibe. I think I put in some pretty clever wording here and there, and it might be that wording that they had been searching for themselves for quite a while when it comes to anger."

In the liner notes of the album, all the songs' lyrics are printed apart from the cover of "Planet Caravan". The liner note reads:

"This is a Black Sabbath song off of the Paranoid album. So don't freak out on us. We did the song because we wanted to. It has nothing to do with the integrity of our direction. It's a tripped out song. We think you'll dig it. If you don't, don't fucking listen to it. Thanks. On behalf of the rest of Pantera, Phil Anselmo '94."

== Artwork ==
The original album cover shows a drill going into someone's anus. However, the record label rejected it, worrying it would harm sales and would be rejected by stores like Walmart and Target. The band changed it to a drill put in the frontal lobe of a human skull. Both covers were created by photographer Dean Karr.

== Release ==
At midnight on March 22, 1994, Pantera launched Far Beyond Driven with an extensive record-store campaign. They traveled to 12 cities in almost five days with MTV documenting their progress. Band members signed autographs, met fans, and promoted the album. The band released "I'm Broken" as the album's first single, which reached No. 19 on the UK Singles Chart, making it the band's highest-charting single worldwide. The LP also contained the first cover song on one of their major-label releases—Black Sabbath's "Planet Caravan", which served as the album's closing track and reached No. 21 on Billboard's Mainstream Rock Tracks and No. 26 on the UK Singles Chart. By March, the LP had sold over 185,000 copies and had reached No. 1 on the U.S. Billboard 200 album charts and Australian charts upon release. It remained on the Billboard 200 for 29 weeks. Shane Mehling of Decibel, commenting on Far Beyond Driven topping the Billboard 200 chart, called it "the first extreme metal record to reach that level of popularity and, in maybe a more perfect world, would have opened the doors for other extreme bands to gain a foothold."

=== Reissue ===
On March 24, 2014, a two-disc deluxe edition of Far Beyond Driven was released to celebrate its 20th anniversary. Disc one is a remastered version of the original album. Disc two is a live album featuring Pantera's set at the 1994 Monsters of Rock festival.

== Critical reception ==
Professional ratings
Review scores
Source	Rating
AllMusic	3/5 stars
Collector's Guide to Heavy Metal	10/10
NME	7/10
Entertainment Weekly	B+
Rolling Stone	4/5 stars

The album received positive reviews. Rolling Stone gave the album four out of five stars. Rolling Stone would eventually rank Far Beyond Driven No. 39 on their list "The 100 Greatest Metal Albums of All Time". Spin wrote in April 1994 that the "quartet has successfully transformed itself into a cross between the older, faster Metallica and today's Rollins Band", adding that "at times, Phil Anselmo is every bit as charismatic as Henry Rollins." AllMusic reviewer Eduardo Rivadavia had a more negative take on the album, stating "Far Beyond Driven may have been Pantera's fastest selling album upon release, but it's hardly their best. In fact, although it shot straight to the number one spot on the Billboard sales chart in its first week (arguably the most extreme album ever to do so), this incredible feat doesn't so much reflect its own qualities as those of its predecessor, 1992's Vulgar Display of Power."

In November 2011, Far Beyond Driven was ranked number six on Guitar World magazine's top ten list of guitar albums of 1994. The album was also ranked at number twenty in Guitar World's "Superunknown: 50 Iconic Albums That Defined 1994" list.

== Tour ==
Pantera toured South America, and were accepted into another Monsters of Rock billing. At that festival on June 4, 1994, the Abbott brothers got into a scuffle with journalists from the music magazine Kerrang! over unflattering cartoon depictions of drummer Vinnie Paul. Then in late June, Anselmo was charged with assault for hitting a security guard after he prevented fans from getting on stage, Anselmo was released on $5,000 bail the next day. The trial was delayed three times. In May 1995, he apologized in court and pleaded guilty to attempted assault and was sentenced to 100 hours of community service. Pantera continued their tour of the United Kingdom and eventually the United States in mid to late 1994, where the band was opened for by fellow heavy metal bands Sepultura and Prong. The tour of Far Beyond Driven also took Pantera to Australia and New Zealand for the first time in November–December 1994. The tour ended in March 1995 with another run through the United States, this time with Type O Negative opening.

== Track listing ==
All tracks are written by Dimebag Darrell, Vinnie Paul, Phil Anselmo and Rex Brown except where noted.

No.	Title	Writer(s)	Length
1.	"Strength Beyond Strength"		3:38
2.	"Becoming"		3:05
3.	"5 Minutes Alone"		5:47
4.	"I'm Broken"		4:24
5.	"Good Friends and a Bottle of Pills"		2:52
6.	"Hard Lines, Sunken Cheeks"		7:01
7.	"Slaughtered"		3:56
8.	"25 Years"		6:05
9.	"Shedding Skin"		5:36
10.	"Use My Third Arm"		4:51
11.	"Throes of Rejection"		5:01
12.	"Planet Caravan" (Black Sabbath cover)	Geezer Butler; Tony Iommi; Ozzy Osbourne; Bill Ward	4:03
Total length:			56:19

Japanese edition bonus track
No.	Title	Writer(s)	Length
13.	"The Badge" (Poison Idea cover)	Jerry A	3:55
Total length:			60:14

20th anniversary edition bonus disc – Live from Donington '94
No.	Title	Length
1.	"Use My Third Arm"	4:04
2.	"Walk"	5:15
3.	"Strength Beyond Strength"	4:01
4.	"Domination / Hollow"	6:54
5.	"Slaughtered"	3:57
6.	"Fucking Hostile"	2:57
7.	"This Love"	7:16
8.	"Mouth for War"	4:01
9.	"Cowboys from Hell"	4:49

== Personnel ==
Pantera

- Phil Anselmo – vocals
- Dimebag Darrell – guitars
- Rex Brown – bass guitar
- Vinnie Paul – drums, congas on "Planet Caravan"

Production

- Terry Date – production, engineering, mixing
- Vinnie Paul – production, engineering, mixing
- Pantera – co-production, arranging
- Ted Jensen – mastering

== Charts ==
=== Weekly charts ===
Chart (1994)	Peak position
Australian Albums (ARIA)	1
Austrian Albums (Ö3 Austria)	8
Canada Top Albums/CDs (RPM)	18
Dutch Albums (Album Top 100)	47
European Albums (European Top 100 Albums)	6
Finnish Albums (The Official Finnish Charts)	3
German Albums (Offizielle Top 100)	7
Japanese Albums (Oricon)	8
New Zealand Albums (RMNZ)	14
Norwegian Albums (VG-lista)	14
Scottish Albums (Official Charts)	8
Swedish Albums (Sverigetopplistan)	2
Swiss Albums (Schweizer Hitparade)	21
UK Albums (Official Charts)	3
UK Rock & Metal Albums (Official Charts)	19
US Billboard 200	1

Chart (2014)	Peak position
Hungarian Albums (MAHASZ)	7

Chart (2024)	Peak position
Croatian International Albums (HDU)	18

=== Year-end charts ===
Chart (1994)	Position
Australian Albums (ARIA)	64
Austrian Albums (Ö3 Austria)	27
European Albums (European Top 100 Albums)	59
German Albums (Offizielle Top 100)	41
Swedish Albums (Sverigetopplistan)	67
US Billboard 200	82

== Certifications ==
Region	Certification	Certified units/sales
Australia (ARIA)	Platinum	70,000^{^}
Canada (Music Canada)	Platinum	100,000^{^}
Japan (RIAJ)	Platinum	200,000^{^}
United Kingdom (BPI)	Gold	100,000^{^}
United States (RIAA)	Platinum	1,530,000
^{^} Shipments figures based on certification alone.
