= Karyn Rachtman =

American music supervisor and film producer

- Born: February 19, 1964 (age 62); Van Nuys, California, U.S.
- Occupations: Music supervisor, film producer, soundtrack executive producer
- Years active: 1989-present
- Employer(s): Mind Your Music (US), Mind Your Music NZ LTD. (Founder and CEO)
- Known for: Pulp Fiction; Reservoir Dogs; Clueless; Romeo + Juliet
- Spouse: Lloyd Levin (m. 1995; div. 2001)
- Children: 2
- Relatives: Riki Rachtman (brother)
- Website: www.mindyourmusic.com

Karyn Rachtman (born February 19, 1964) is an American music supervisor and film producer. One of the "most influential music supervisors of all time," she has music supervised and/or served as the executive soundtrack producer on albums that have sold over 75 million copies worldwide.

With Pras Michael and Ben Patterson, Rachtman produced the 2015 film Sweet Micky for President, a documentary about Michel Martelly's path to the Haitian presidency. She executive produced Archie's Final Project, a film about a teenage student who decides to kill himself on-camera as his final high school project, and created the children's "read and rap-along" book series Hip Kid Hop.

== Early life ==
Karyn Rachtman was born in Los Angeles, California, to Peter Rachtman, a music manager, and Sheila Watson, an educator. Her parents divorced when she was a child, and she and her brother Riki lived mainly with their mother. Growing up, she was "obsessed" with music, and would go to her father's house on weekends and listen to his records. Rachtman was first exposed to the film industry through the actress Karen Black, who her father dated in the 1970s.

At 15, Rachtman—a "wayward" teenager—was sent to live with her father, who had moved to New Zealand. She dropped out of high school, and remained in New Zealand for a year. She attended cosmetology school when she returned to Los Angeles.

== Career ==
=== Cannon Films,Texasville, Reservoir Dogs ===
Rachtman moved to New York in 1982. She worked at a clothing store, where she met Paula Erickson, then the head of music for Cannon Films in LA. Learning that Erickson "got paid to put cool old songs in movies," she begged to be her assistant, and moved back to Los Angeles. At Cannon, Rachtman learned how to prepare cue sheets, clear music, and negotiate music rights, and worked on films including Rappin' and Texas Chainsaw Massacre 2. She left Cannon to work as a plugger for Island Music, and then cleared music for established music supervisors, working independently. In 1990, she was hired by Peter Bogdanovich to music supervise Texasville, and received her first credit as a music supervisor on a major film. She founded her company, Mind Your Music, later that year.

In 1992, producer Stacey Sher introduced Rachtman to Quentin Tarantino, who was working on his feature-length debut, Reservoir Dogs. He was determined to use the Stealers Wheel song "Stuck in the Middle With You" for a pivotal scene, and the music supervisor on the film had been unable to secure the necessary rights. After a complicated negotiation, Rachtman acquired the song, and Tarantino hired her as the music supervisor for Reservoir Dogs. Rachtman brought the soundtrack album to MCA, and the resulting record deal paid for the music that was ultimately used in the film. The music used in Reservoir Dogs—particularly "Stuck in the Middle with You" -- "would change cinema thereafter."

=== Reality Bites, Pulp Fiction, Clueless, Capitol and Interscope Records ===
In 1994, Rachtman worked on 15 films, including two, simultaneously: Reality Bites, with director Ben Stiller, and Pulp Fiction with Tarantino. The Reality Bites soundtrack was one of the biggest records of the year; its lead single, Lisa Loeb's "Stay (I Missed You)," was the first song by an independent artist to hit #1 on the Billboard Pop Charts. The use of music in Pulp Fiction was a "milestone in creative music supervision" that "dramatically changed how most movie producers thought about the music that accompanied their films." The Pulp Fiction soundtrack has sold four million copies since its release.

By the end of the 1990s, Rachtman had music supervised or executive produced soundtracks for Clueless, Get Shorty, The Basketball Diaries, Romeo + Juliet, Grace of My Heart, Boogie Nights, Bulworth and The Rugrats Movie, among others. She had worked closely with Amy Heckerling, Baz Luhrmann, Paul Thomas Anderson, Warren Beatty, Allison Anders and Robert Rodriguez, and become one of the most sought-after music supervisors in the film industry.

In the mid-1990s, as the relationship between the film and music industries became more synergistic, the role of the music supervisor "became far more important as the potential economic benefits of soundtrack albums continued to grow," and Rachtman was pursued both by filmmakers and record companies. In 1994, she was named vice president of soundtracks and A&R for Capitol Records, and in 1997—engineered in part by Beatty—she was appointed head of soundtracks for Interscope Records. At Interscope, she music supervised and/or executive soundtrack produced Moulin Rouge!, Office Space, the Rugrats Movie, Bulworth, and Mystery Men (the latter of which help put Smash Mouth’s All Star as the lead single to the soundtrack, and on the map). She was also given her own imprint, Gazillion Records. After leaving Interscope, Rachtman once again worked independently, subsequently music supervising films including Laurel Canyon, North Country, Holes and The SpongeBob SquarePants Movie.

=== Hip Kid Hop, Archie's Final Project, Sweet Micky for President, Mind Your Music NZ LTD ===
In 2002, Rachtman went to Scholastic with an idea for a series of children's picture books called Hip Kid Hop. Inspired by the read-along books of her childhood, as well as the similarities between hip-hop's language and the language of books for children, Hip Kid Hop was geared toward readers aged 4–10. The first books in the series, by LL Cool J and Doug E. Fresh, were "morality tales and stories about developing personal strength." Each book came with a read-along CD.

She music supervised and executive produced Archie's Final Project (originally released as My Suicide) in 2009, a dark comedy about a teenager who becomes the most popular kid in his high school when he announces he is going to kill himself on camera for his final video class project. The film won the 2009 Best Feature at the Berlin Film Festival, in addition to other awards. She produced Sweet Mickey for President with Pras Michael, who she first met while working on Bulworth. She began the project as an executive producer, and became a producer as she got more involved in the hands-on production of the film. A documentary about Michael Martely, a colorful musician who ran for president of Haiti in the wake of the 2010 earthquake that devastated the country, it was a selection for film festivals including the Los Angeles Film Festival and the Slamdance Film Festival where it won the juried award for Best Documentary as well as the audience award.

Rachtman began to split her time between New Zealand and Los Angeles in 2016. In addition to the US-based Mind Your Music, she is the founder and CEO of Mind Your Music NZ LTD, a resource for filmmakers, advertisers, and brands to assist with spotting, pre-recording, on camera performances, composer selection/negotiation, song creation and selection, licensing, marketing tie-ins, and soundtrack release. Mind Your Music's clients have included Anonymous Content, Hasbro, Levi Strauss & Co., Activision, CNN and Vice Media. In 2023, she music supervised her first major studio film in many years. The movie Ruby Gillman, Teenage Kraken got her an uncredited role as a supervisor for the music.

Rachtman was appointed to the board of the New Zealand Symphony Orchestra in 2024.

== Personal life ==
Rachtman lives in Los Angeles and Waiheke Island, near Auckland. She was married to film producer Lloyd Levin. She has two sons.

== Filmography ==
Year	Project	Credit	Notes
1989	Warm Summer Rain	Musical director	
1989	Big Man on Campus	Music coordinator	
1990	A Girl to Kill For	Music supervisor	
1990	Texasville	Music supervisor	
1991	Shout	Music supervisor	
1991	Dutch	Music coordinator	
1992	Used People	Music supervisor	
1992	Dr. Giggles	Music supervisor	
1992	Ladybugs	Music supervisor	
1992	Reservoir Dogs	Music supervisor	
1993	Judgment Night	Music supervisor	
1993	Bakersfield P.D.	Music supervisor	"The Imposter" episode
1993	Freaked	Music supervisor	
1993	Gunmen'	Music supervisor	
1993	Bodies, Rest & Motion	Music supervisor	
1994	Reform School Girl	Music supervisor	
1994	Cool and the Crazy	Music supervisor	
1994	Timecop	Music supervisor	
1994	Shake, Rattle and Rock!	Executive music producer	
1994	Girls in Prison	Music supervisor	
1994	In the Army Now	Music supervisor	
1994	Rebel Highway	Music supervisor	"Runaway Daughters" episode
1994	Motorcycle Gang	Music supervisor	
1994	Confessions of a Sorority Girl	Music supervisor	
1994	Roadracers	Music supervisor	
1994	Pulp Fiction	Music supervisor	
1994	The Last Seduction	Music Supervisor	
1994	Fresh	Music consultant	
1994	Reality Bites	Music supervisor	Lead single by Lisa; Loeb hit #1
1994	Trevor	Music supervisor	
1995	Fallen Angels	Music supervisor	6 episodes
1995	Get Shorty	Music supervisor	
1995	Four Rooms	Music supervisor	
1995	Clueless	Music supervisor	43 weeks on the Billboard charts, reissued on vinyl in 2015
1995	Desperado	Music supervisor	
1995	The Basketball Diaries	Music supervisor	
1996	Romeo + Juliet	Executive soundtrack producer	5× platinum
1996	Grace of My Heart	Executive music producer	
1996	Boys	Music supervisor	
1997	Boogie Nights	Music supervisor	
1997	Good Burger	Music supervisor	
1998	The Rugrats Movie	Music supervisor	Soundtrack included Beck; Patti Smith, Iggy Pop
1998	Bulworth	Executive soundtrack producer	
1999	Mystery Men	Music supervisor	
1999	Office Space	Music supervisor	
2000	What Planet Are You From?	Music supervisor	
2001	Moulin Rouge!	Executive soundtrack producer	4.5× platinum worldwide
2003	Holes	Music supervisor	
2003	Laurel Canyon	Executive soundtrack album producer/music supervisor	
2004	The SpongeBob SquarePants Movie	Executive music producer	
2005	Stay	Music consultant	
2005	North Country	Music supervisor	
2006	Barnyard	Executive music producer/music supervisor	
2008	An American Affair	Music supervisor	
2009	Archie's Final Project	Executive producer Executive music producer	Best feature and Golden Bear; Berlin Film Festival
2015	Sweet Micky for President	Film producer, executive soundtrack producer	Audience Award and Jury Award; Slamdance Film Festival
2017	Skylanders Academy (TV Series)	Music supervisor	25 episodes
2024	Bookworm	Music supervisor	
2025	A Minecraft Movie	Music supervisor	
2025	Plankton: The Movie	Music supervisor	
