= I'm Broken =

1994 single by Pantera

Single by Pantera

from the album Far Beyond Driven
- B-side: "Slaughtered"
- Released: March 7, 1994
- Recorded: 1993
- Genre: Groove metal
- Length: 4:25
- Label: East West; Atco
- Songwriters: Dimebag Darrell; Vinnie Paul; Phil Anselmo; Rex Brown
- Producers: Terry Date; Vinnie Paul

Pantera singles chronology
"Walk" (1993)	"I'm Broken" (1994)	"Planet Caravan" (1994)

"I'm Broken" is a song by American heavy metal band Pantera, released on their 1994 studio album, Far Beyond Driven. It was the first single released from the album.

== Meaning ==
The song is about the back pain that Pantera's vocalist Phil Anselmo felt. Phil Anselmo said "This is right when I started feeling the pain in my lower back, and it felt scary," says Anselmo. "I think this is one of the first times in my life, man, that I had this thing called 'vulnerability' kick in, and that was a very uncomfortable feeling." Anselmo adds, "I think that was really my first glimpse into kind of screaming to the world, 'Fucking... I am broken! Somebody fucking help me here!'"

== Origin ==
Pantera's guitarist Dimebag Darrell spoke about the song saying:

""I'm Broken" was a sound check riff – one of them ones where I'd walk in with a hangover from ripping it up night after night with everyone in every town. That's where a lot of the best riffs I ever wrote came from. I just played the first riff I thought of, Vinnie started kickin' in on it, Rex joined in – we didn't write the entire song on the spot, but we kept toying with it and finally worked on it once we got into the studio."

== Release and reception ==
"I'm Broken" was released as the band's first single for Far Beyond Driven. Two versions of the single were released. Both contained the B-side "Slaughtered", but each version included a differing pair of live tracks. All live tracks were recorded in Moscow, USSR at the Monsters of Rock concert in 1991. The single garnered the band its second top 40 UK hit, reaching number 19 on the UK Singles Chart, making it the band's highest charting single worldwide. It also reached number 49 on the Australian Singles Chart and number 32 on the Swedish Singles Chart. The song was also nominated for Best Metal Performance at the 1995 Grammy Awards. AllMusic reviewer Eduardo Rivadavia called "I'm Broken" a "wisely chosen first single".

== Live performance ==
A live version of the song can be found on the band's live album Official Live: 101 Proof. During live performances of the song, the band would have Dimebag Darrell performing backup vocals and would end the song with the outro of "By Demons Be Driven".

== Cover art ==
The covers for parts one and two each show a little over half of Pantera vocalist Phil Anselmo's face, with part two rendered as the negative image of part one. When compared, it can be seen that the two are mirror images of one side (the same side) of the face, rather than each showing a different half.

== Track listing ==
CD single one ("I'm Broken/Slaughtered" part one)

- All tracks written by Pantera
1. "I'm Broken" – 4:25
2. "Slaughtered" – 3:57
3. "Domination" (live) – 6:33
4. "Primal Concrete Sledge" (live) – 3:56

CD single two ("I'm Broken/Slaughtered" part two)

- All tracks written by Pantera
1. "I'm Broken" – 4:25
2. "Slaughtered" – 3:57
3. "Cowboys from Hell" (live) – 5:10
4. "Psycho Holiday" (live) – 5:49

== Personnel ==
=== Pantera ===
- Phil Anselmo – vocals
- Dimebag Darrell – guitar
- Rex Brown – bass
- Vinnie Paul – drums

=== Production ===
- Terry Date – producer

== Covers ==
- "I'm Broken" was covered by Malefice for Metal Hammer's Dimebag Darrell tribute album, Getcha' Pull: A tribute to Dimebag Darrell.
- "I'm Broken" was covered by Trepalium on their fourth album, H.N.P.

== Uses in media ==
- The song was released as downloadable content for Rock Revolution and Rock Band 3.
- It is a playable track in Guitar Hero: Warriors of Rock.
- The music video was featured on Beavis and Butt-Head on the episode "The Pipe of Doom", where it received a rave response from the duo.
- The song was featured in a Carl's Jr. and Hardee's television commercial, starting in December 2015. The commercial features a burger flying through the air after the song's opening riff.
- As of February 4, 2020, the song is used as the opening theme for the National Wrestling Alliance digital series NWA Power.
- The song is revealed to be part of the radio station “The Chamber 106.6” within the video game Grand Theft Auto VI.

== Charts ==
Chart (1994)	Peak position
Australia (ARIA)	49
Finland (Suomen virallinen lista)	12
Scottish Singles Sales (Official Charts)	20
Sweden (Sverigetopplistan)	32
UK Singles (Official Charts)	19
UK Rock & Metal Singles (ERA)	1

== Certifications ==
Certifications for "I'm Broken"
Region	Certification	Certified units/sales
New Zealand (RMNZ)	Gold	15,000^{‡}
^{‡} Sales+streaming figures based on certification alone.
