= Planet Caravan =

1970 song by Black Sabbath

Song by Black Sabbath

from the album Paranoid
- Released: 18 September 1970
- Recorded: 16–21 June 1970
- Genre: Psychedelic rock; space rock
- Length: 4:29
- Label: Vertigo; Warner Bros.
- Songwriters: Tony Iommi; Bill Ward; Geezer Butler; Ozzy Osbourne
- Producer: Rodger Bain

"Planet Caravan" is a song by the English heavy metal band Black Sabbath. It was originally released on their 1970 album Paranoid.

== Overview ==
Black Sabbath's Geezer Butler – who composed the song's lyrics – said the song is about floating through the universe with one's lover. Black Sabbath lead vocalist Ozzy Osbourne uses a Leslie speaker to achieve the vocals' treble and vibration effects. The piano parts on the track were played by album engineer Tom Allom. Iommi overdubbed flute to the reversed multitrack master which was then re-forwarded and treated with stereo delay.

On 31 May 2020, "Planet Caravan" was used as wake-up music for the crew of a SpaceX Crew Dragon before the craft's launch later that day. It was the first time music was used to wake astronauts since the last shuttle mission in July 2011. The craft was bound for the International Space Station.

== Legacy ==
Nigel Williamson of Uncut considers it a "curveball" on Paranoid as it finds the band as "unlikely psychedelic dreamers with flute, bongo, cosmic guitar and a dreamy, far-away vocal from Osbourne as he sings about floating through space. It's about as close to Pink Floyd as Sabbath ever got." Also writing for Uncut in 2000, David Stubbs describes "Planet Caravan" as "a dubby, pastoral piece haunted by Ozzy's treated vocals which could sit alongside any of today's post-Massive Attack trip hop offerings." He cites it as evidence of the group's capability for subtlety, deeming it "a glimmer of something else in the Sabs' black pool of noise, something that, sadly, got washed away along the way." Grayson Haver Currin Pitchfork, noting the song's "circular bass and hand-drum patter", cites it alongside Miles Davis' contemporary 'electric' period as a "clear precedent for metal's exploratory psychedelic side", citing Om as an example. AllMusic biographer describes it as a "trippy, mellow doom anthem" that revealed Black Sabbath "had far more creative gas in the tank than their detractors would have cared to admit." Morgana Robinson has cited it as the song she wants played at a funeral, praising it as "so otherworldly."

== Personnel ==
- Ozzy Osbourne – vocals
- Tony Iommi – guitars, flute
- Geezer Butler – bass guitar
- Bill Ward – congas
- Tom Allom – piano

== Pantera cover ==
"Planet Caravan"

Single by Pantera

from the album Far Beyond Driven
- Released: 1994
- Recorded: 1994
- Length: 4:03
- Label: East West
- Songwriters: Tony Iommi; Bill Ward; Geezer Butler; Ozzy Osbourne
- Producers: Terry Date; Vinnie Paul

Pantera singles chronology
"I'm Broken" (1994)	"Planet Caravan" (1994)	"5 Minutes Alone" (1994)

"Planet Caravan" was covered by American heavy metal band Pantera for their 1994 album Far Beyond Driven.

=== Release and reception ===
The song was released as the second single from the Far Beyond Driven album, and the follow-up single to their hit single "I'm Broken" in 1994 on East West Records as a 12" single. It became Pantera's highest-charting single, peaking on the UK Singles Chart at number 26. Metal Hammer magazine ranked the cover of "Planet Caravan" number 31 on their list of the 50 best Pantera songs. Reaching 21 on the Mainstream Rock Chart, it was their first hit single, accompanied by a music video that was among the first to tell a story via computer graphics. The song was performed by Pantera at the 2025 Back to the Beginning concert in support of Black Sabbath and Ozzy Osbourne.

=== Track listing ===
American single

No.	Title	Length
1.	"Planet Caravan" (Album Version)	4:03
2.	"Cowboys from Hell" (Live)	5:08
3.	"Primal Concrete Sledge" (Live)	3:57
4.	"By Demons Be Driven" (Biomechanical Mix)	4:16

European single 1

No.	Title	Length
1.	"Planet Caravan" (Black Sabbath cover)	4:03
2.	"The Badge" (Poison Idea cover)	3:56
3.	"A New Level" (Live)	5:43
4.	"Becoming" (Live)	4:04

European single 2

No.	Title	Length
1.	"Planet Caravan" (Black Sabbath cover)	4:03
2.	"The Badge" (Poison Idea cover)	3:56
3.	"Domination" (Live)	4:55
4.	"Hollow" (Live)	2:27

=== Charts ===
Chart (1994–1995)	Peak position
Australia (ARIA)	90
UK Singles (OCC)	26
UK Rock & Metal (OCC)	2
US Mainstream Rock (Billboard)	21
