= Cowboys from Hell (song) =

Single by Pantera

from the album Cowboys from Hell
- Released: 1990
- Genre: Groove metal; thrash metal
- Length: 4:07
- Label: Atlantic
- Songwriters: Dimebag Darrell; Vinnie Paul; Phil Anselmo; Rex Brown
- Producer: Terry Date

Pantera singles chronology
"Cowboys from Hell" (1990)	"Psycho Holiday" (1990)

"Cowboys from Hell" is a song by American heavy metal band Pantera. First appearing on the band's 1989 demo album, the song is the band's first single. It was released later on the major label debut album Cowboys from Hell, and on the band's compilation album.

Pantera used the phrase "Cowboys from Hell" (or its abbreviation, CFH) liberally in its image and merchandise.

In 2021, Eli Enis of Revolver included the song in his list of the "15 Greatest Album-Opening Songs in Metal".

== Production ==
Pantera's vocalist Phil Anselmo recalled on an episode of That Metal Show that during a 1989 house party in Fort Worth, Texas, guitarist Dimebag Darrell (Darrell Abbott) arrived late and ran towards Anselmo and said he had a new riff to show him. The two of them went into Abbott's car where he played the intro to Anselmo, who said afterward to Abbott, "Yes, this must be an anthem."

Drummer Vinnie Paul described the concept:

Cowboys is where everybody came into their own, along with the full-blown Pantera sound", "That was actually the first song we wrote for the record. Basically it was about us coming out of Texas and being out of place. People don't think of Texas as being a hot spot for heavy metal, they think of New York or L.A. or something like that, so it just seemed like an obvious concept for us.

Bassist Rex Brown remembered the designing of the introduction:

The crazy noise at the beginning was just a Dime thing, that's what he was hearing in his head so he made a loop of that to play over. I just remember it was fucking very repetitious and very fucking annoying for a long while. And that "Cowboys From Hell" intro is a little form of in-the-box scaling. We were always down the street watching all these great blues guys come through because Vinnie and Darrell's dad [Jerry Abbott] was an engineer at Pantego studio. We'd sneak down there and sit way underneath the board listening to all this great stuff. And I think that's where Dime got the idea for that intro to "Cowboys". He started it as a kind of modal exercise because he would practice it forwards and backwards.

The song was recorded for the band's 1989 demo album, Cowboys from Hell: The Demos. After the band got signed to Atco Records, the band rerecorded the song and put it on the major label debut album Cowboys from Hell. It was written predominantly in the E minor blues scale.

== Reception ==
The song ranked #25 on VH1's 40 Greatest Metal Songs.

Guitar World considered "Cowboys from Hell" to be the best Pantera song, writing: "Dimebag Darrell's delicious solo boldly announced that a new guitar hero was in town and loaded for bear".

Metal Hammer ranked the song #3 on its list of the 50 best Pantera songs.

== Music video ==
The music videos for this song and for "Psycho Holiday" were recorded in a Dallas club that the band frequented called "The Basement" and were directed by Paul Rachman. The video simply shows the band playing the song live to an audience.

== Personnel ==
- Phil Anselmo – vocals
- Diamond Darrell – guitars, additional bass
- Rex – bass, additional rhythm guitar
- Vinnie Paul – drums

== Certifications ==
Region	Certification	Certified units/sales
New Zealand (RMNZ)	Gold	15,000^{‡}
United Kingdom (BPI)	Silver	200,000^{‡}
^{‡} Sales+streaming figures based on certification alone.
