= Deletion (music industry) =

Term for removing a record from a label's catalog

In the music industry, deletion is the removal of a record or records from a label's official catalog, so that it is out of print. This is usually done when a title becomes unprofitable to manufacture, but it may also occur at a record artist's request.

== Process ==
Deletion can be for a variety of reasons, but usually reflects a decline in sales so that distributing the record is no longer profitable. Singles are routinely deleted after a period of weeks, but an album by a major artist may remain in the catalog indefinitely.

When titles are deleted in the US, the remaining stock would be defaced with a cut-out through the sleeve or case. Cut-out records formed a grey market outside the major distribution channels. In the 1993 book Stiffed: A True Story of MCA, the Music Business, and the Mafia Bill, Knoedelseder wrote of how MCA Records became the subject of a federal investigation of its cut-out sales practices after a deal allegedly involving organized crime.

== Effects ==
Deletion in the music industry differs from print publishing in that recording contracts generally do not return the rights to the artist when a title ceases to be manufactured. When PolyGram took over JMT Records, a small jazz label, in 1995, it was understood to have announced that the entire JMT catalogue would be deleted, shocking dozens of artists. According to Tim Berne, "this means that the majority of my work simply vanishes."

According to Louis Barfe, "many deleted gems are locked in archives, unheard and quite possibly deteriorating." Although he recommends that they digitize this music and offer it for download, he notes that "niche labels have sprung up specialising in reissuing out-of-copyright recordings". Some bootlegs have been issued just so fans can obtain deleted recordings without having to search the second hand market for them.

== Digital media ==
More recently, the rise of digital media has eliminated much of the cost of music distribution, and companies have begun to see deleted records for their long tail potential, selling via iTunes and other online means. A single company, ArkivMusic, has struck deals with all four major publishers (and numerous minor ones) of classical music recordings to make their deleted records available via a burn-on-demand service.

== Exceptions ==
A prominent exception to the practice was the label Folkways Records, whose founder Moe Asch "never deleted a single title from the ... catalogue". According to Asch, "Just because the letter J is less popular than the letter S, you don't take it out of the dictionary." When the label was disbanded, Asch enlisted the Smithsonian Institution to maintain the catalogue "in perpetuity".

== Examples ==
In July 1972, the British music paper Melody Maker reported that a cut-price LP issued by Virgin Records was facing deletion because, ironically, it was too popular. Faust's The Faust Tapes, then at number 18 in Melody Maker's chart, actually cost more to produce than its selling price (49p) and so Virgin lost supposedly £2,000 on sales of 60,000. It has since been argued that this move was merely a publicity stunt by Virgin's owner, Richard Branson.

On November 16, 1990, Arista Records deleted Milli Vanilli's album Girl You Know It's True very quickly after Frank Farian admitted that Rob Pilatus and Fab Morvan did not sing on the record. In addition to this, the duo's Grammy Award was revoked a few days later.

American heavy metal band Pantera's first four albums were deleted through the band's own independent label, Metal Magic Records: Metal Magic, Projects in the Jungle, I Am the Night, and Power Metal. The largely glam metal-oriented albums are not favorites of the band, who transitioned to groove and thrash metal from the release of Cowboys From Hell onward. They are only available in bootleg form. Rex Brown himself said that there will never be a reissue of them, citing every member of the band's most well-known lineup having been against it.

The British duo The KLF summarily deleted their entire back catalogue when they 'retired' from the music industry in 1992.

Manic Street Preachers' 2000 single "The Masses Against The Classes" was deleted on the day of release as a promotional gimmick. However, copies of the single continued to be available until supplies ran out, which allowed it to reach Number 1, and remain in the charts for 7 weeks.

The 2006 Gnarls Barkley single "Crazy" was deleted by Warner Music after six weeks at #1 in the UK as a deliberate move to protect it from overexposure. Deleted singles could not then remain on the UK Singles Chart, so the physical single no longer charted after two weeks. However, it remained as a high-selling download single and has continued to receive heavy airplay well after the single was deleted.

On 20 April 2013, Dutch composer John Ewbank deleted his song "Koningslied" ("The King's Song") only two days after its initial release, citing an overload of criticism aimed at him personally and at the song itself from the general public and the media. The song had been commissioned to act as the official song of Willem Alexander, Prince of Orange's upcoming investiture as the new King of the Netherlands on 30 April 2013. The song, already at number one in the iTunes download charts on the day of its release, was performed by a large number of well known Dutch artists.

== See also ==
- Out of print
