= Down Below =

Down Below may refer to:

- Down Below (The Cruel Sea album), 1989, and its title track
- Down Below (Tribulation album), 2018
- Down Below, a 2004 album by Steve Zing
- "Down Below", a song by Pantera from the 1985 album I Am the Night
  - "Down Below", a song by Pantera from the 1988 album Power Metal
- "Down Below", a song about London's sewers, written by Sydney Carter

== See also ==
- Downbelow (disambiguation)
- Fire Down Below (disambiguation)
