= Pantego =

Pantego may refer to several United States locations:

- Pantego, Texas
- Pantego, North Carolina
- Pantego Christian Academy, a school with campuses in Tarrant County, Texas
