= Lori Glaze =

American scientist

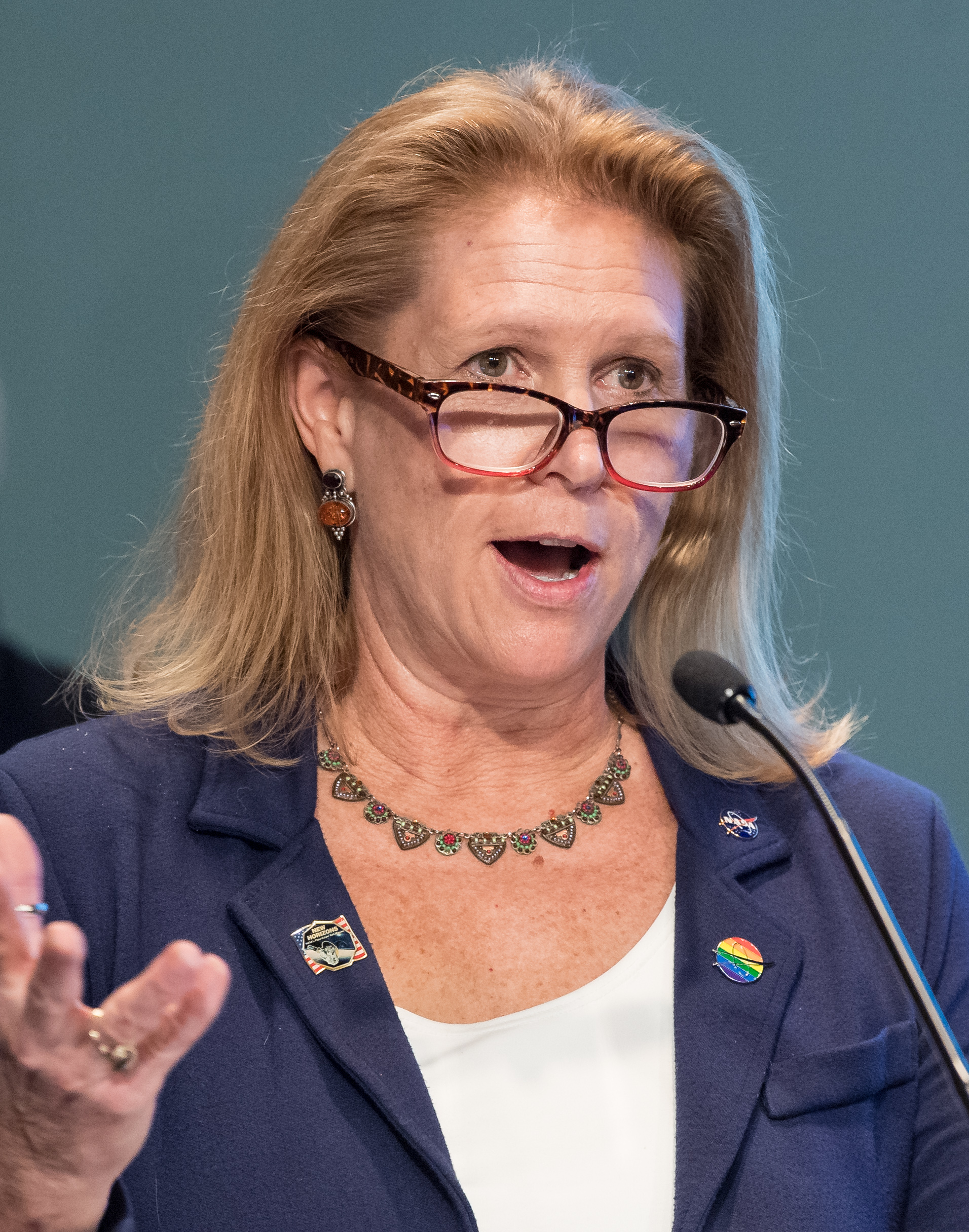
- Glaze in 2019
- Born: April 8, 1964 (age 62); Dallas, Texas, U.S.
- Other name: Dr. Lori Glaze
- Occupation: NASA scientist
- Known for: Venus exploration
- Spouse: Terrence Lee Glaze
- Children: 2

Academic background
- Education: PhD in environmental science; BS and MS in physics
- Alma mater: Lancaster University; University of Texas at Arlington

Lori Glaze (April 8, 1964) is an American scientist and is the associate administrator for NASA's Human Spaceflight Mission Directorate.

She was previously the director of NASA's Science Mission Directorate's Planetary Science Division and deputy associate administrator for the Exploration Systems Development Mission Directorate.

She was a member of the Inner Planets Panel during the most recent Planetary Science Decadal Survey, and has had a role on the Executive Committee of NASA's Venus Exploration Analysis Group (VEXAG) for several years, serving as the group's Chair from 2013–2017.

Glaze has been involved with many NASA-sponsored Venus mission concept formulation studies, including as a member of the Venus Flagship Science and Technology Definition Team (2009), as Science Champion for the Venus Mobile Explorer (2010), and Co-Science Champion for the Venus Intrepid Tessera Lander (2010).

== Career ==
She graduated from University of Texas at Arlington, and Lancaster University.

Glaze has been an advocate for women in science and for the importance of understanding Venus in our quest to better understand Earth.

Glaze has more than 15 years of scientific management experience, including over ten years as the Vice President of Proxemy Research, Inc. She also spent three years as Associate Laboratory Chief and three years as Deputy Director in the Solar System Exploration Division at NASA's Goddard Space Flight Center.

Glaze was the Principal Investigator for a proposed NASA Discovery mission to Venus, Deep Atmosphere Venus Investigation of Noble gases, Chemistry, and Imaging (DAVINCI). This mission would send a probe on a journey through Venus' atmosphere, descending over the planet's roughest and most geologically complex terrain. The DAVINCI probe would explore the planet's atmosphere from top to bottom, including the deep atmospheric layers largely hidden from Earth-based instruments and orbiting spacecraft. DAVINCI would be the first U.S. probe in nearly four decades to target Venus' atmosphere.

After a period of being the Acting Director from May 2018 to mid-2019, Glaze became the full Director of NASA's Science Mission Directorate's Planetary Science Division.

In November 2024 Glaze was appointed Deputy Associate Administrator for NASA's Exploration Systems Development Mission Directorate (ESDMD).

In February 2025 Glaze was appointed as Acting Associate Administrator for NASA's Exploration Systems Development Mission Directorate (ESDMD). She oversees the cancellation of a large number of programs of her Directorate: e.g. SLS, Orion, Gateway.

== Personal life ==
Glaze is married to former Pantera and Lord Tracy singer and frontman Terry Glaze. They have two daughters.

== Professional achievements and awards ==
- 2026–present: Acting Associate Administrator for NASA's Human Spaceflight Mission Directorate (HSMD)
- 2025–2026: Acting Associate Administrator for NASA's Exploration Systems Development Mission Directorate (ESDMD)
- 2024–2025: Deputy Associate Administrator for NASA's Exploration Systems Development Mission Directorate (ESDMD)
- 2019–2024: Director of Planetary Science Division at NASA's Science Mission Directorate
- May 2018–2019: Acting Director, NASA's Science Mission Directorate's Planetary Science Division
- 2013–present: Member, Planetary Science Subcommittee of the NASA Advisory Council
- 2013–2017: Chair, Venus Exploration Analysis Group (VEXAG)
- 2009–2010: Special Act Award for Leadership (Science Champion) of two Planetary Decadal Mission Concept Studies (Venus Mobile Explorer, Venus Intrepid Tessera Lander)
- 2009–2010: Member of National Academy of Science Decadal Survey, Inner Planets Panel
- 2009–2013: Venus Exploration Analysis Group (VEXAG) Steering Committee Member
- 2008–2009: Member of NASA's Venus Flagship Science and Technology Development Team
- 2007–2012: Associate Editor for the Journal of Geophysical Research, Solid Earth
