= Jerry Abbott =

American songwriter and record producer (1942–2024)

- Born: Jerry Bob Abbott; April 8, 1942; Abilene, Texas, U.S.
- Died: April 2, 2024 (aged 81) Denton, Texas, U.S.
- Genres: Country; heavy metal; glam metal
- Occupations: Songwriter; record producer
- Label: Metal Magic

Jerry Bob Abbott (April 8, 1942 – April 2, 2024) was an American country music songwriter and record producer. He was the father of heavy metal musicians Vinnie Paul and Dimebag Darrell, both formerly of Pantera and Damageplan.

== Biography ==
Abbott was born in Abilene, Texas, on April 8, 1942. He began playing the piano at age eight and took up the guitar aged 15. He joined a local band at the age of 18 and spent a few years touring Texas, then began working as a member of resident bands in numerous nightclubs. During this time, he attended college and obtained a business degree. In 1973, Abbott was hired as a sound engineer by the owner of a local recording studio.

Abbott married Norma Carolyn Adkisson in 1962. They divorced in 1979. The marriage produced two sons: Vincent Paul (1964–2018) and Darrell Lance (1966–2004). His sons co-founded the heavy metal band Pantera in 1981, and Abbott was the band's first manager. He also produced the group's early albums Metal Magic (1983), Projects in the Jungle (1984), I Am the Night (1985) and Power Metal (1988), at his recording studio Pantego Sound. All of these albums were released by Metal Magic Records, a label that Abbott had created under the alias Jerry Eld'n.

After Pantera agreed to a major-label deal with Atco Records in 1989, Abbott left his role as the band's producer, though Cowboys from Hell (1990) and Vulgar Display of Power (1992) were both recorded at Pantego Sound. In Texas, Abbott also served as a producer for Texas blues artist Bugs Henderson.

Abbott then moved to Nashville to become a country songwriter and founded a new studio, Abtrax Recording. Pantera's album Far Beyond Driven (1994) was recorded at Abtrax. Abbott was successful as a songwriter with his works recorded by Country artists including Don Gibson ("Let's Get Together", 1975), Freddy Fender ("If You're ever in Texas", 1976, and others), and Buck Owens' duet with Emmylou Harris ("Play Together Again, Again", 1979).

Abbott's former wife Carolyn died from lung cancer in 1999. His younger son Darrell was murdered in 2004 and his elder son Vincent died from a heart attack in 2018. All three are buried at the Moore Memorial Gardens cemetery in Arlington, Texas.

Abbott died at a caregiving facility in Denton, Texas, on April 2, 2024, at the age of 81.
