= Downbelow =

Downbelow can refer to:

- Downbelow, also known as Pell's World, a fictional planet in C. J. Cherryh's Alliance-Union universe
  - Downbelow Station, a 1981 science fiction novel by C. J. Cherryh
- Downbelow, an unused portion of Babylon 5 (fictional space station)

== See also ==
- Down Below (disambiguation)
