= Power Metal (album) =

Studio album by Pantera
- Released: May 1988 (Note: Different publications may contradict its May release date, such as the group's official website claiming its release on June 24, 1988.)
- Studio: Pantego Sound (Pantego, Texas)
- Genre: Heavy metal
- Length: 38:10
- Label: Metal Magic
- Producers: Pantera; Jerry Abbott; Marc Ferrari

Pantera chronology
I Am the Night (1985)	Power Metal (1988)	Cowboys from Hell (1990)

Power Metal is the fourth album by the American heavy metal band Pantera, released in May 1988 through Metal Magic.

The album signaled a shift in a heavier direction and has been described as a "bridge" between the band's original glam metal style and the heavier groove metal sound of their subsequent work. Power Metal contains influences from speed and thrash metal amid the band's previous pop metal style. The album's sound, particularly in Phil Anselmo's vocal performance, has been compared to that of Judas Priest.

== Background ==
In November 1985, tensions arose between singer Terry Glaze and the band members. He was given a two-week notice, which they hoped would resolve the tension, but left the group. After this, the band held auditions for a replacement singer. Matt L'Amour (a David Coverdale lookalike) joined in July 1986, who stayed with the band until October. The original singer Donny Hart returned in November.

Still looking for a singer that would fit the group's intended heavier style, New Orleans native Phil Anselmo, who the band had met on the road, replaced Hart; Power Metal marks Anselmo's first appearance with the band.

== Writing ==
"Proud to Be Loud" was written and produced by Keel guitarist Marc Ferrari and was originally intended to appear on their 1987 album Keel; however, Keel would not record their own version until Keel VI: Back in Action in 1998.

Glaze had originally written some of the band's lyrics. However, Anselmo changed most of them except "Down Below", with an earlier recording of the song appearing on Pantera's third album I Am the Night (1985) crediting Glaze.

== Promotion ==
As the record was close to being finished with Anselmo on the vocals, the band signed a contract with Gold Mountain Records, one of the distributors with MCA, primarily based on the band's relationship with Marc Ferrari of Keel.

Gold Mountain Records executive Danny Goldberg felt that the record was "too heavy". Drummer Vinnie Paul stated that the label wanted to "change our style and make us sound like Bon Jovi", which the band refused. As a result, the band was forced to release the album through Metal Magic. With limited promotion, the album did not chart.

Atco Records were considering re-issuing the album, "if we sell three million of [Cowboys from Hell]", Paul stated. Furthermore, right after its release, the group still kept their Power Metal album in circulation for their fans, but not on a major scale.

In a Blabbermouth interview with Phil Anselmo in 2013, when asked about possibly reissuing the album, he replied:

"No, I've never thought about that. As far as catalogues or re-releases and whatnot, I'm not against it. I think it's an interesting thing to bring up. Matter of fact, I think you're the first guy to ever really ask if that was going to be a re-release, so thumbs up for you. Honestly, if people got past the image and whatnot of the bar-band hair bullshit that was going on in the late '80s, you would pretty much realize that it's a pretty solid metal record all around in the vein of Judas Priest ..."

In a UK Eonmusic interview with Rex Brown in 2021, he stated that the band, including himself, was against reissuing the album, alongside the earlier albums with Glaze. Brown asserted that he did not "want to give any credit where it's fuckin' undue," referring to Glaze.

The past four glam albums were not considered a part of their history, and do not appear on any digital streaming service, except the song "Proud to be Loud", was only distributed by Universal Music Group, due to its presence on movie titles.

== Critical reception ==
Professional ratings
Review scores
Source	Rating
AllMusic	2.5/5 stars
Loudwire	no rating
Revolver	no rating
Rock Hard	8/10

In a retrospective review, Bradley Torreano at AllMusic awarded Power Metal 2.5 stars out of 5, noting it as being the culmination of the band's first four albums of hair metal. He described it as "an interesting and transitional early effort from one of the most important metal bands of the '90s." He criticized the lyrics, remarking that they are "the biggest problem, showing none of the gutter poetry that [Phil] Anselmo would develop through time and instead reflecting a bland interest in all things 'rock'". He went on to highlight Dimebag Darrell's guitar work, calling it "one of the more charming elements of the band's early sound" and that "he was obviously a very talented guitarist even then".

Asking how Anselmo recalled the album's impressions, he said to Revolver:

To say I'm proud of it, no, I'm not. But to say that we as a band were still trying discover who the fuck we were and what we could do, that's very evident. I did the best I could, and I think the songs were heavier overall, more attacking.

LA Weekly called it one of Pantera's best albums, "a solid album of 1980s speed metal".

== Track listing ==
All credits adapted from the original LP.

All tracks are written by Pantera (Phil Anselmo, Diamond Darrell, Vinnie Paul, Rex Rocker), except where noted.

Side one
No.	Title	Writer(s)	Length
1.	"Rock the World"		3:34
2.	"Power Metal"		3:53
3.	"We'll Meet Again"		3:54
4.	"Over and Out"		5:06
5.	"Proud to Be Loud"	Marc Ferrari	4:02

Side two
No.	Title	Writer(s)	Length
6.	"Down Below"	Darrell, Terry Glaze, Paul, Rocker	2:49
7.	"Death Trap"		4:07
8.	"Hard Ride"		4:16
9.	"Burnnn!"		3:35
10.	"P*S*T* 88"	Darrell, Paul, Rocker	2:51
Total length:			38:10

== Personnel ==
All credits adapted from the original LP.

Pantera

- Phil Anselmo – lead vocals (except "P*S*T* 88"), backing vocals
- Diamond Darrell – guitar, backing vocals, lead vocals on "P*S*T* 88"
- Rex Rocker – bass guitar, tubular bells, backing vocals
- Vinnie Paul – drums, backing vocals

Additional performers

- Marc Ferrari – rhythm guitar on "Proud to Be Loud", lead guitar on "We'll Meet Again" (fadeout), backing vocals
- The Eld'n – keyboards

Technical personnel

- Jerry "The Eld'n" Abbott – engineering, remixing, production (except "Proud to Be Loud")
- Phil Anselmo – production (except "Proud to Be Loud")
- Diamond Darrell – remixing, production (except "Proud to Be Loud")
- Rex Rocker – production (except "Proud to Be Loud")
- Vinnie Paul – engineering, remixing, production (except "Proud to Be Loud")
- Marc Ferrari – production on "Proud to Be Loud"
- Tom Coyne – mastering at Frankford/Wayne Mastering Labs, New York City
- Joe Giron – photography
- Recorded and mixed at Pantego Sound, Pantego, Texas
