= Projects in the Jungle =

Studio album by Pantera
- Released: July 27, 1984
- Recorded: December 1983—April 1984
- Studio: Pantego Sound (Pantego, Texas)
- Genre: Glam metal; heavy metal
- Length: 35:47
- Label: Metal Magic
- Producer: Jerry Abbott; Pantera

Pantera chronology
Metal Magic (1983)	Projects in the Jungle (1984)	I Am the Night (1985)

Projects in the Jungle is the second studio album by American heavy metal band Pantera, released on July 27, 1984, through Metal Magic Records.

The band would make their first music video for the track "All Over Tonight". Though the album, particularly Glaze's vocals, shares many similarities with Def Leppard's pre-Hysteria sound (Pyromania had been released the year before), the album also contains influences from bands like Judas Priest and, in addition to Van Halen-inspired guitar solos, features many speed metal-oriented guitar riffs.

== Reception ==
Professional ratings
Review scores
Source	Rating
AllMusic	2.5/5 stars
Collector's Guide to Heavy Metal	7/10
The Encyclopedia of Popular Music	3/5 stars
Sputnikmusic	2/5 stars

In a retrospective review for AllMusic, Eduardo Rivadavia described Terry Glaze's vocal style as "ear assaulting" and the lyrics as "frequently moronic" examples of glam metal cliches of the era. Nonetheless, Projects in the Jungle was "a major improvement over the band's tentative performance on debut album Metal Magic, and its much improved production clarity and musicianship spoke volumes of Pantera's growing professionalism and maturity."

Metal Hammer included the album cover on their list of "50 most hilariously ugly rock and metal album covers ever".

According to Vinnie Paul in 1990, the album sold 15,000+ copies.

== Track listing ==
All credits adapted from the original LP.

All tracks are written by Pantera.

Side one
No.	Title	Length
1.	"All Over Tonight"	3:36
2.	"Out for Blood"	3:09
3.	"Blue Light Turnin' Red"	1:38
4.	"Like Fire"	4:01
5.	"In Over My Head"	3:58

Side two
No.	Title	Length
6.	"Projects in the Jungle"	3:05
7.	"Heavy Metal Rules!"	4:18
8.	"Only a Heartbeat Away"	4:01
9.	"Killers"	3:30
10.	"Takin' My Life"	4:31
Total length:		35:47

== Personnel ==
All credits adapted from the original LP.

Pantera

- Terrence Lee – vocals, additional keyboards
- Diamond Darrell – guitars
- Rex Rocker – bass guitar
- Vinnie Paul – drums

Production

- Jerry Abbott – production, engineering, mixing
- M.C. Rather – mastering
- Recorded and mixed at Pantego Sound, Pantego, Texas
