= Lord Tracy =

American hard rock band

- Origin: Memphis, Tennessee, U.S.
- Genres: Hard rock; heavy metal
- Years active: 1985–1991; 2004–present
- Labels: UNI; MCA
- Members: Chris Craig; Kinley "Barney" Wolfe; Terry Glaze; Jimmy "R" Rusidoff
- Past members: Brian Harris

Lord Tracy is an American hard rock band formed in 1985.

== History ==
Lord Tracy originally consisted of former Black Oak Arkansas bassist Kinley "Barney" Wolfe, drummer Chris Craig and guitarist Jimmy "R" Rusidoff. Terry Glaze, formerly of Pantera, joined in 1986 as lead vocalist. Their first album, Deaf Godz of Babylon, was released in the fall of 1989 on UNI Records / MCA. The album's lead single, "Out with the Boys", reached No. 40 on the Billboard Mainstream Rock Chart. A ballad, "Foolish Love", was the album's follow-up single. Although the Deaf Gods of Babylon album failed to sell many copies, it remains a notable release for its use of humor and its diverse influences, ranging from Beastie Boys to Motörhead. Following the release of Deaf Gods, the band toured extensively from 1989 to 1991 and broke apart while on the road in the summer of 1991.

Bassist Kinley Wolfe would go on to join The Cult as a touring member from 1991 to 1994 and then teamed up with guitarist Mark Christian from The Big F in the band Milk The Cow whose eponymous debut was issued in 1996. After moving back to Texas, he formed Dallas trio The American Fuse, releasing One Fell Swoop in 1997. More recently Wolfe has been playing with The Javelinas.

In 2004, Lord Tracy reunited and has since played a limited number of shows per year in Texas, Arizona, Mexico, Brazil and Spain. Guitar player Brian Harris replaced Jimmy Rusidoff in 2006 with Jimmy Rusidoff returning in 2013. Lord Tracy continues to be creatively active and released the album Porn Again in 2008.

Between 2008 and 2010, Lord Tracy would play off and on throughout the south and mid west. In 2010, Patrick "Taz" Bentley, a founding member of Burden Bros., filled in for drummer Chris Craig for a hometown show at the House of Blues in Dallas. Craig was unable to play the show because of prior commitments. Instead of replacing Craig with Taz, the other members decided to form a new band with Taz playing drums. This band would initially be named Pinches Bolillos, but the name was changed to 76 early on. 76 does not play any Lord Tracy songs, writing and playing original songs instead.

On Saturday, April 6, 2013, the original lineup of Lord Tracy reunited to perform as the headline act at the Basement Reunion #5 at Trees in Dallas, Texas. On April 13, 2013, the band played a show at The Stage Stop in Memphis, Tennessee. Lord Tracy returned to The Stage Stop to play consecutive nights on February 2 and 3, 2018. The owner of The Stage Stop, Nita Makris, supported the band from their early days onwards, and requested they play two of the final shows at the venue before it closed. The final show was reserved for Seeing Red.

== Members ==
Current

- Kinley "Barney" Wolfe – bass, backing vocals (1985–1991, 2004–present)
- Chris Craig – drums, percussion (1985–1991, 2004–present)
- Terry Glaze – lead vocals, rhythm guitar, piano (1986–1991, 2004–present)
- Jimmy "R" Rusidoff – lead guitar, backing vocals (1985–1991, 2004–2006, 2013-present)

Former

- Brian Harris – lead guitar, backing vocals (2006–2013)

== Discography ==
DEAF GODS OF BABYLON (1989 © UNI Records, Inc.)
1 – Out With The Boys (3:53)
2 – East Coast Rose (5:50)
3 – She's A Bitch (4:33)
4 – Barney's Wank (0:36)
5 – Whatchadoin' (4:14)
6 – Chosen Ones (5:49)
7 – In Your Eyes (4:11)
8 – Rats Motel (3:39)
9 – Foolish Love (3:54)
10 – She Man Blues (0:21)
11 – King Of The Nighttime Cowboys (3:12)
12 – 3 H. C. (1:25)
13 – Submission (2:35)
14 – Pirahna (2:09)
15 – Ivory Lover (0:24)

- All track names and times taken from CD label* UNID-606

Produced by: Mark Dodson

LIVE (Recorded at The Basement in Dallas, TX, in 1989 and released in 2004)

- Transsexual
- Rats Motel
- Deserai
- Me and The King
- King of the Nighttime Cowboys
- She's A Bitch
- In Your Eyes
- Whatchadoin'
- Foolish Love
- Barney's Bass Solo
- East Coast Rose
- Pirahna
- 3HC
- I Want You
- (Let's Go) Rodeo
- Out With The Boys
- Don't Give Up On Love

This is a live mix for the ZRock Concert series mixed by Danny Brown.

CULL NONE (2004)

- Intro
- Devil Song
- Don't Give Up On Love
- Fella Sho' Dance
- Big Surprise
- 17 Year
- Come Back To Me
- Heart In Your Hands
- Jes Like You
- Drum Thang
- Woman Is Wood
- Beverly Hills
- Yo Love
- Big Black Cadillac
- Can't Be Serious
- Eat Them
- Moby Dixie Head
- Burning Love
- Fleetwood Mac
- Choo Choo

4 (2004)

- Rip It Up (Paper Love)
- Kick It Out
- Saxophone
- Wrong All The Right Outta Me
- Drive All Night
- Transsexual
- Wind Me Up
- Let's Go Rodeo
- Debbie's Got A Chainsaw
- Party At The Motel
- Barney's Chained Melody
- No More Tears
- Back Again
- Nobody's Business
- Everything Sounds Allright
- Paula's
- Morning Light
- If You Break My Heart (I'll Break Your Neck)

Un-release demo and live recordings recorded and mixed by Danny Brown

Porn Again (2008)

- I Should've Known
- Jinx
- Too Much
- Know Me
- Everything
- Friends
- Long Way To Go
- Wondermilk
- Man In Japan
- Number One Fan
- Can't Be Wrong
- Outasite
- Wank 2000
- Messin' Around
