= Metal Magic =

Studio album by Pantera
- Released: June 10, 1983
- Studios: Pantego Sound, Pantego, Texas
- Genres: Glam metal; heavy metal; hard rock
- Length: 39:37
- Label: Metal Magic
- Producers: Jerry Abbott & Pantera

Pantera chronology
Metal Magic (1983)	Projects in the Jungle (1984)

Metal Magic is the debut studio album by American heavy metal band Pantera, released on June 10, 1983, through Metal Magic Records. Like the band's next three releases, it is musically oriented toward a glam/heavy metal sound influenced by Kiss and Van Halen. The album was released on the band's own label (also called Metal Magic) and produced by Jerry Abbott (under the alias "The Eld'n"), a country music songwriter and producer and the father of Vinnie Paul and Dimebag Darrell (then known as Diamond Darrell), who were 19 and 16 years old, respectively, at the time of release.

== Background ==
Pantera was formed in Arlington, Texas in 1981. The band was originally named Gemini, then Eternity, before finally settling on Pantera.

== Reception and legacy ==
Professional ratings
Review scores
Source	Rating
AllMusic	1.5/5 stars
Collector's Guide to Heavy Metal	6/10
The Daily Vault	C+
Metal Forces	8/10

In a retrospective review for AllMusic, Eduardo Rivadavia gave Metal Magic a largely negative ranking of 1.5 stars out of a possible 5. He described the album as "exceedingly average hard rock and metal misfires" with only two promising songs in "I'll Be Alright" and "Widowmaker". Furthermore, the album's "strongest asset" even in these early years was Diamond Darrell's guitar playing.

Drummer Vinnie Paul said the album sold around 5,000 copies by 1990.

In 2024, Joe DaVita of Loudwire included the album in his list of "60 Hilariously Awful Metal Album Covers", where he was quoted saying: "There is NO magic happening here."

== Track listing ==
All credits adapted from the original LP.

Side one
No.	Title	Writer(s)	Length
1.	"Ride My Rocket"	Vince Abbott; Darrell Abbott	4:55
2.	"I'll Be Alright"	V. Abbott; D. Abbott	3:13
3.	"Tell Me If You Want It"	Terry Glaze	3:44
4.	"Latest Lover"	V. Abbott; D. Abbott; Glaze	2:54
5.	"Biggest Part of Me"	Glaze	4:49

Side two
No.	Title	Writer(s)	Length
6.	"Metal Magic"	V. Abbott; D. Abbott	4:17
7.	"Widowmaker"	V. Abbott; D. Abbott	3:03
8.	"Nothin' On (But the Radio)"	Glaze	3:30
9.	"Sad Lover"	V. Abbott; D. Abbott	3:27
10.	"Rock Out!"	Glaze	5:45
Total length:			39:37

== Personnel ==
Pantera

- Terry Glaze – vocals, guitars
- Darrell Abbott – guitars
- Rex Rocker – bass guitar
- Vince Abbott – drums

Production

- Jerry Abbott – production, engineering, mixing
- M.C. Rather – mastering
- Recorded at Pantego Sound, Pantego, Texas
