= I Am the Night (album) =

Studio album by Pantera
- Released: August 16, 1985
- Recorded: November 1984
- Studio: Pantego Sound (Pantego, Texas)
- Genres: Glam metal; heavy metal
- Length: 37:51
- Label: Metal Magic
- Producers: Jerry Abbott; Pantera

Pantera chronology
Projects in the Jungle (1984)	I Am the Night (1985)	Power Metal (1988)

Singles from I Am the Night
- 1. "Hot 'N' Heavy" Released: July 12, 1985

I Am the Night is the third studio album by American heavy metal band Pantera, released on August 16, 1985, through Metal Magic Records. It was the last Pantera album to feature lead singer Terry Glaze.

I Am the Night was made available only on vinyl and cassette, with any subsequent CD releases being bootlegs transferred from the vinyl or tape originals. The track "Hot and Heavy" was released as a single and promoted with the band's second music video.

The album sold 25,000+ copies, which was considered high for an independent release.

== Artwork ==
Simon Young of Metal Hammer gave his assessment on the figure present on the album's cover artwork: "We've been up late and that is definitely not 'the night', no matter how many Black Tooth Grins were imbibed during the ideas meeting for this... whatever this is."

== Reception and legacy ==
Professional ratings
Review scores
Source	Rating
AllMusic	2.5/5 stars
Collector's Guide to Heavy Metal	7/10
The Encyclopedia of Popular Music	3/5 stars
Rock Hard	8.5/10

I Am the Night is generally not held at the same level of esteem as some of Pantera's later releases. Eduardo Rivadavia of AllMusic gave the album two and a half stars out of five, and wrote:

"As with all of Pantera's 'forgotten' albums, it is invariably Darrell's playing that makes these growing pains more tolerable, and also helps to make sense of how they became one of the only heavy metal bands in history to grow more commercially successful by becoming more extreme."

Metal Hammer included the album cover on their list of "50 most hilariously ugly rock and metal album covers ever".

== Track listing ==
All credits adapted from the original LP.

All tracks are written by Pantera.

Side one
No.	Title	Length
1.	"Hot and Heavy"	4:06
2.	"I Am the Night"	4:27
3.	"Onward We Rock!"	3:56
4.	"D*G*T*T*M" ("Darrell Goes to the Movies") (instrumental)	1:43
5.	"Daughters of the Queen"	4:16

Side two
No.	Title	Length
6.	"Down Below"	2:49
7.	"Come-On Eyes"	4:13
8.	"Right on the Edge"	4:06
9.	"Valhalla"	4:05
10.	"Forever Tonight"	4:10
Total length:		37:51

== Personnel ==
All credits adapted from the original LP.

Pantera

- Terrence Lee – vocals
- Diamond Darrell – guitars
- Rex Rocker – bass guitar
- Vinnie Paul – drums

Production

- Jerry Abbott – production, engineering, mixing
- Tom Coyne – mastering
- Recorded and mixed at Pantego Sound, Pantego, Texas
