= Fire Down Below =

Fire Down Below may refer to:

== Books ==
- Fire Down Below (novel), a novel by William Golding and final part of the trilogy To the Ends of the Earth
- Fire Down Below, an unwritten science fiction story in Robert Heinlein's Future History

== Film and television ==
- Fire Down Below (1957 film), starring Robert Mitchum, Jack Lemmon, and Rita Hayworth
- Fire Down Below (1997 film), starring Steven Seagal
- "Fire Down Below" (Man About the House), a 1976 TV episode
- "The Fire Down Below", an episode of Hercules: The Legendary Journeys

== Music ==
- "Fire Down Below", a 1957 Top 30 Jeri Southern song
- "The Fire Down Below", a song on the 1976 Bob Seger & the Silver Bullet Band album Night Moves
- "Fire Down Below", a song written by bassist Jerry Scheff for Elvis Presley; the backing track was recorded in 1976, but vocals by Presley or any other backing singers were never overdubbed.
- "Fire Down Below", a song by Alkaline Trio on the album Agony & Irony
- "Fire Down Below", a song by Tina Charles on the soundtrack album of the film The Stud
