= Pantego Christian Academy =

Private Christian school

Coordinates: 32.722026°N 97.141651°W

Pantego Christian Academy (PCA) is a private Christian school in Tarrant County, Texas, United States. Its main campus, the Arlington Campus, has a building at 2201 West Park Row Drive in Arlington and a 57,000-square-foot (5,300 m^{2}) high school building at 2221 West Park Row Drive in Pantego. The Arlington Campus has 670 students in grades pre-kindergarten through grade 12. The system also operates the Mansfield Campus at 2351 Country Club Drive in Mansfield which teaches 143 students from age 3 through grade 5. The Mansfield campus closed its doors in 2020 and now all students attend the Arlington campus.

== History ==
Pantego Bible Church opened the school in 1963 (63 years ago) on a 7-acre (2.8 ha) site between Arlington and Pantego. In 1996 the church and school began separate financial operations, and in 1997 (29 years ago) the school became an independent school, purchasing the Pantego Bible Church facilities for its use, while the church built facilities at a new location. In 2008 (18 years ago), PCA continued to expand its facilities by purchasing the adjacent Stripling & Cox building to use as a high school. PCA recently celebrated its 50th anniversary.

== Athletics and fine arts ==
Pantego Christian Academy high school students participate in several sports, including football, basketball, baseball, volleyball, golf, swimming, tennis, and cheerleading. Pantego Christian Academy students compete with other schools in the Texas Association of Private and Parochial Schools in the 4A division. The Pantego Christian Academy Band and the Pantego Christian Academy Art Team have won TAPPS state championships in recent years: the band program in 2008 and 2009 and the art team in both 2007 and 2009. The Panther Pride Dance Team, has also won several contests over the past few years. The band acts as a Concert, Jazz, and Marching band. The Pantego football team recently won the district championship for Tapps 3A football, as well as the Theatre department moving onto state after winning the district championship for their one act play.
