= Terry Glaze =

American singer (born 1964)

- Born: Terrence Lee Glaze; November 29, 1964 (age 61); Columbus, Ohio, U.S.
- Genres: Glam metal; hard rock
- Occupation: Musician
- Instruments: Vocals; guitar; keyboards
- Years active: 1981–present
- Member of: Lord Tracy
- Formerly of: Pantera

Terrence Lee Glaze (born November 29, 1964) is an American singer and musician best known for his work with heavy metal band Pantera from 1981 to 1986. He appeared on the band's first three albums during their "glam metal" era as the band's lead vocalist before being replaced by Phil Anselmo in 1986. He subsequently joined Lord Tracy as their lead vocalist.

== Pantera ==
Glaze was the lead singer of Pantera from 1982 to 1986, although he originally joined the band as a second guitarist in 1981, when the band was still rehearsing with original lead singer Donnie Hart. Glaze took over vocal duties in 1982 after Hart left the band, while still contributing some additional guitar parts on some of the band's songs.

His vocal range caught the attention of many record label A&Rs and he was credited for bringing Pantera to the forefront of heavy metal music. However, a dispute with the band's musical direction ultimately led to Glaze leaving Pantera in 1986 with Glaze wanting to keep the glam metal style and the rest of the band wanting to have a heavier sound.

== Post-Pantera ==
In 1986, Glaze joined three rock musicians from Tennessee to form the band Lord Tracy, releasing one LP (Deaf Gods of Babylon) in 1989 through Uni Records. The band broke up in 1991 and Glaze formed another band, Blowphish, which included Mike Malinin (Goo Goo Dolls). When Blowphish failed to land a major record deal, Glaze moved to Prince George's County, Maryland, where he plays locally with his party band The Crayfish, and occasionally gets together with other local musicians.

In May 2006, Glaze appeared throughout VH1's Behind the Music: Pantera. Notable moments include him talking about Dimebag Darrell being buried with the famous guitar of Eddie Van Halen, used around the Van Halen II era.

In April 2010, Rex Brown invited Glaze onstage during an Arms of the Sun gig in Dallas to perform a couple of old Pantera tracks, "All Over Tonight" and "Come-On Eyes". It was the first time since 1986 that Glaze had played with a former Pantera bandmate.

Glaze currently lives in Bowie, Maryland with his wife, NASA associate administrator Lori Glaze, and their two children.

== Discography ==
=== With Pantera ===
- Metal Magic (1983)
- Projects in the Jungle (1984)
- I Am the Night (1985)

=== With Lord Tracy ===
- Deaf Gods of Babylon (1989)
- Live (2004)
- Cull None (2005)
- 4 (2006)
- Porn Again (2008)
