= Pantego, Texas =

Town of Pantego
- Town
- Location of Pantego in Tarrant County, Texas
- Coordinates: 32°42′55″N 97°09′17″W
- Country: United States
- State: Texas
- County: Tarrant
- Incorporated (city): May 22, 1952

Area
  - Total: 1.04 sq mi (2.70 km^{2})
  - Land: 1.04 sq mi (2.70 km^{2})
  - Water: 0 sq mi (0.00 km^{2})
- Elevation: 587 ft (179 m)

Population (2020)
  - Total: 2,568
  - Estimate (2021): 2,528
  - Density: 2,460/sq mi (951/km^{2})
- Time zone: UTC-6 (CST)
  - Summer (DST): UTC-5 (CDT)
- ZIP code: 76013
- Area code: 817
- FIPS code: 48-55020
- GNIS feature ID: 2413106
- Website: http://www.townofpantego.com

Pantego is a town in Tarrant County, Texas, United States. Its population was 2,568 at the 2020 census. It is entirely surrounded by the cities of Arlington and Dalworthington Gardens. It is in the middle of the Dallas–Fort Worth metroplex, a metropolitan area spanning several counties.

== History ==
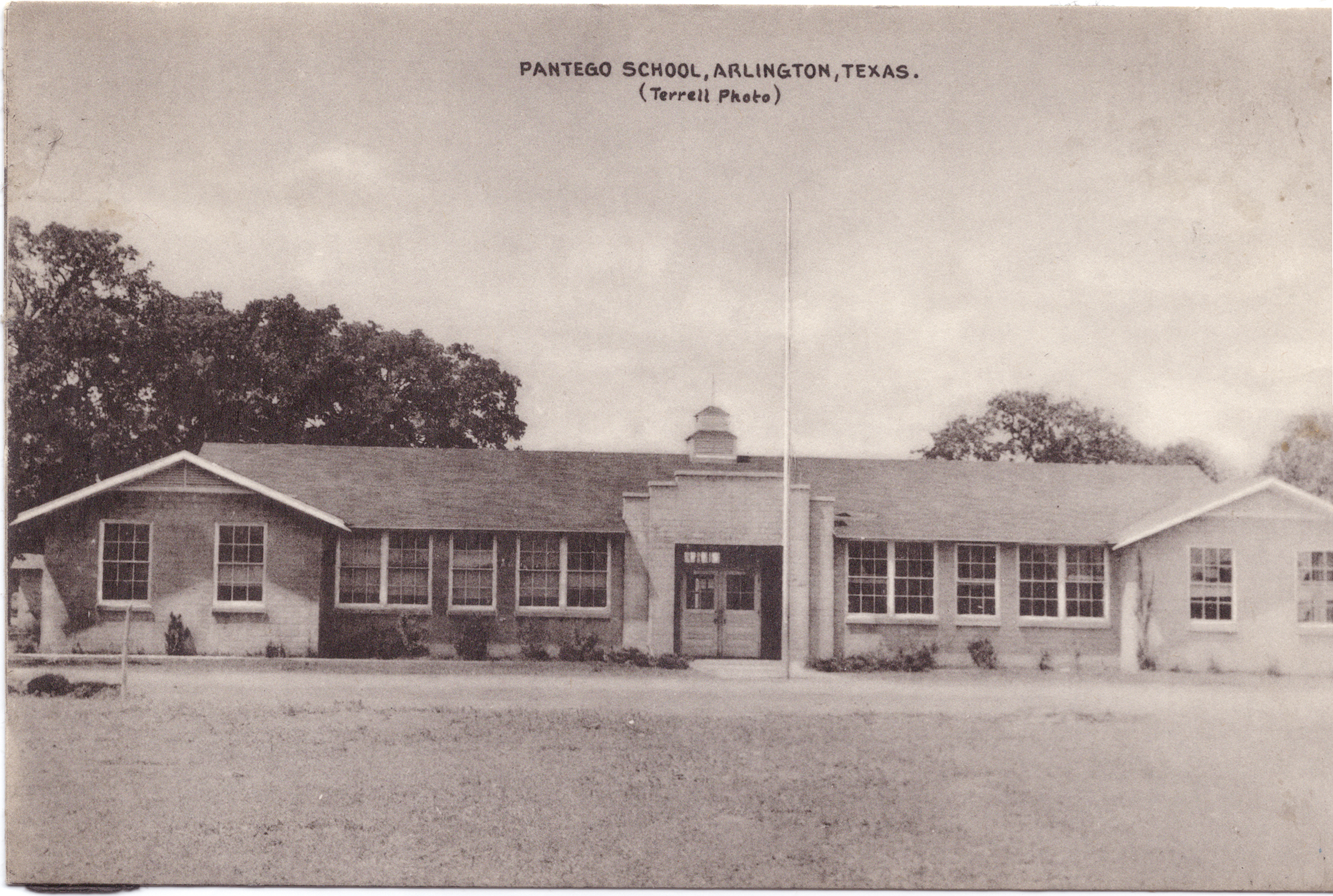
Postcard of Pantego School, at the time in Arlington, undated

The earliest Europeans in the area are thought to be the members of the De Soto expedition under Luis de Moscoso, in 1542. The expedition is thought to have camped near what is now Village Creek. European settlement in the Pantego area dates back at least to the 1840s. After the May 24, 1841, battle between Texas General Edward H. Tarrant and Native Americans of the Village Creek settlement, a trading post was established at Marrow Bone Spring in present-day Arlington. The rich soil of the area attracted farmers, and several agriculture-related businesses were well established by the late 19th century.

Settler and state representative Frederick Forney Foscue acquired the land that is now Pantego after the Civil War. He bought land, sold and rented it to other settlers in the area, and can be considered the first land developer of Pantego. According to local tradition, Colonel Foscue had a Native American friend named Pantego. In 1883, Colonel Foscue donated land for a school. Tradition holds the school was named Pantego in honor of Colonel Foscue's friend. The town took form shortly after and took the name Pantego, reflected now in the feathered Town of Pantego logo.

Originally incorporated in 1949, the town dissolved in February 1952 and reincorporated on May 22, 1952.

== Geography ==
According to the United States Census Bureau, the town has a total area of 1.0 square mile (2.6 km^{2}), all land.

The town's southern border adjoins Dalworthington Gardens; both towns are completely surrounded by the city of Arlington.

== Demographics ==
Historical population
Census	Pop.	Note	%±
1950	646		—
1960	238		−63.2%
1970	1,779		647.5%
1980	2,431		36.6%
1990	2,371		−2.5%
2000	2,318		−2.2%
2010	2,394		3.3%
2020	2,568		7.3%
2021 (est.)	2,528	▼	−1.6%
U.S. Decennial Census

Pantego racial composition as of 2020 (NH = Non-Hispanic) (Note: Note: the US Census treats Hispanic/Latino as an ethnic category. This table excludes Latinos from the racial categories and assigns them to a separate category. Hispanics/Latinos can be of any race.)
Race	Number	Percentage
White (NH)	1,927	75.04%
Black or African American (NH)	144	5.61%
Native American or Alaska Native (NH)	14	0.55%
Asian (NH)	47	1.83%
Some other race (NH)	18	0.7%
Mixed/multiracial (NH)	123	4.79%
Hispanic or Latino	295	11.49%
Total	2,568	

As of the 2020 United States census, 2,568 people, 1,064 households, and 672 families were residing in the town.

== Education ==
No colleges or universities are present in this small community, but the town lies within driving distance to Arlington and the rest of the Dallas/Fort Worth metropolitan area, which contains a number of colleges and universities, including the University of Texas at Arlington, the Southeast Campus of the Tarrant County College system, and Arlington Baptist University.

Pantego lies within the Arlington Independent School District. Pantego is zoned to Hill Elementary School, Bailey Junior High School, and Arlington High School.

In Texas, school district boundaries do not always follow city and county boundaries because all aspects of the school district government apparatus, including school district boundaries, are separated from the city and county government. In the case of Pantego, no independent school district (ISD) was ever established. The proximity of the already established Arlington ISD led to the entirety of Pantego being served by the AISD since the middle of the 20th century.

Pantego Christian Academy has facilities within the city limits of Pantego and Arlington. Around 2008, the school bought a 57,000-square-foot (5,300 m^{2}) building at 2221 West Park Row Drive to use as a high school campus.

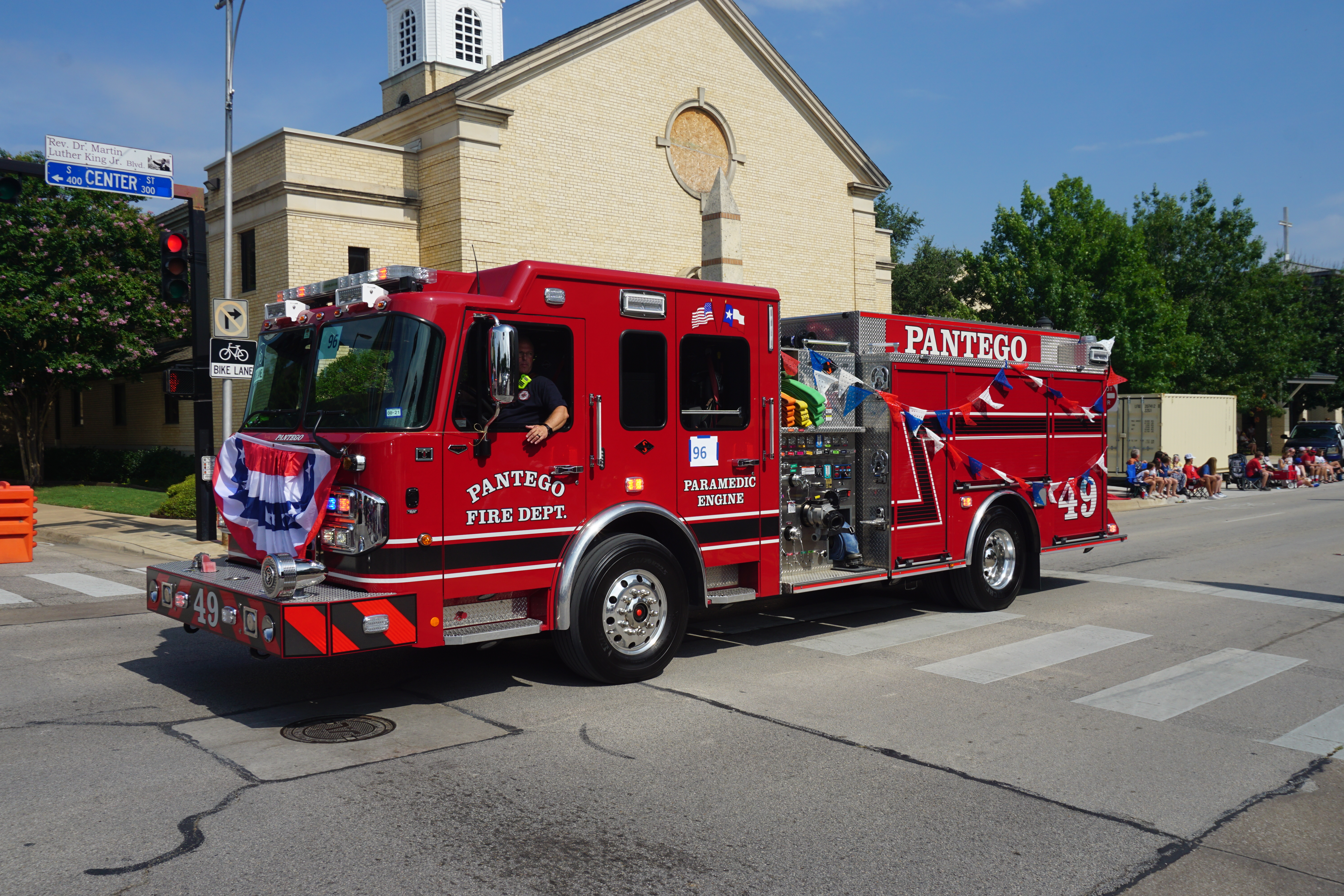
Pantego Fire Department fire engine in the 2021 Arlington Independence Day Parade

== Law and government ==
Pantego is a general law city. It has a city council consisting of five members elected at large for staggered two-year terms and a mayor elected for a two-year term.

Pantego has a council-manager form of government. It has full-time police and fire departments and several citizen committees.

Residents can obtain a library card from Arlington's library system.

The United States Postal Service operates the Pantego Post Office in Arlington.
