= Stone Temple Pilots discography =

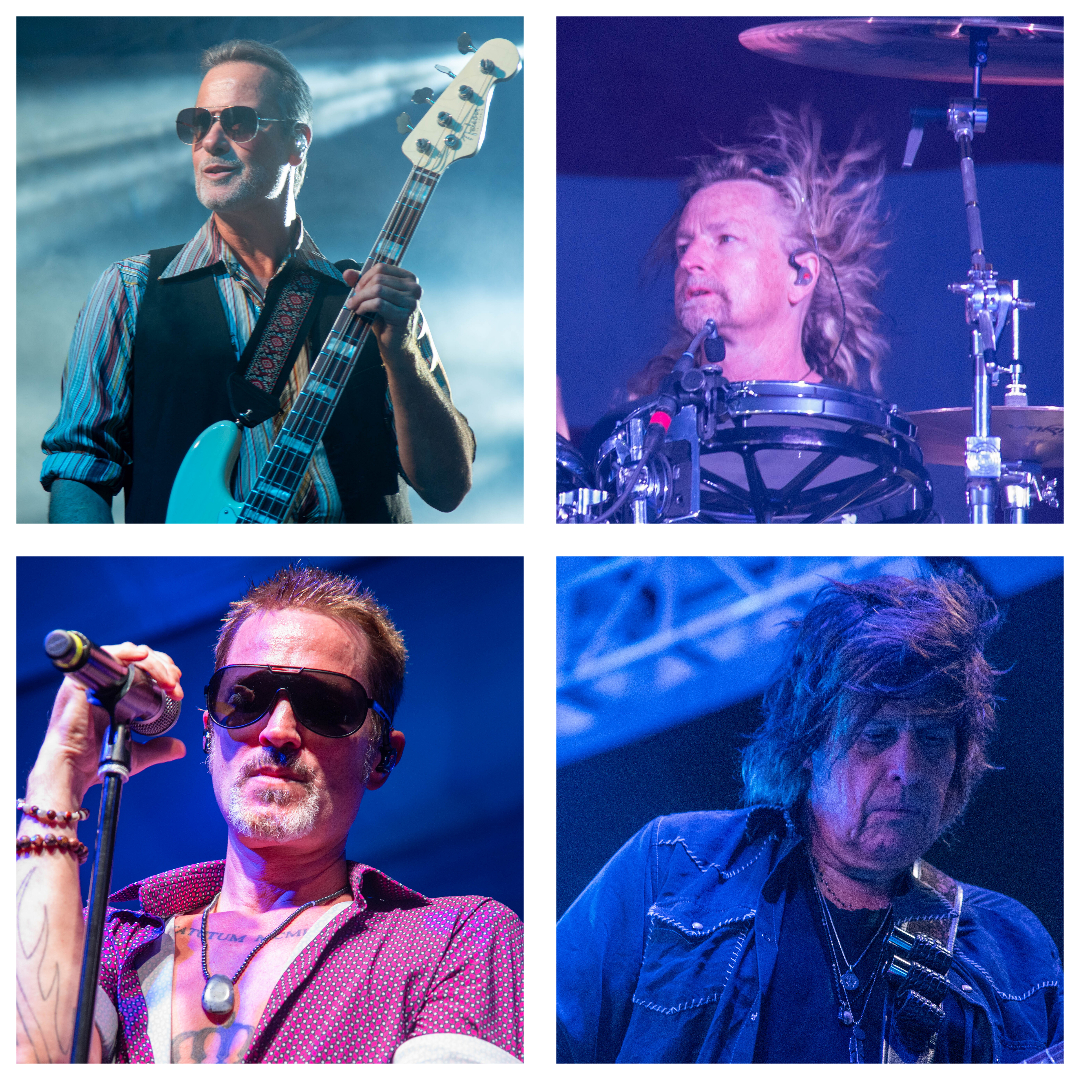
- Stone Temple Pilots' lineup since 2017
- Studio albums: 8
- Extended plays: 1
- Live albums: 2
- Compilation albums: 3
- Singles: 34
- Music videos: 22

The discography of Stone Temple Pilots, an American rock band, consists of 8 studio albums, 3 compilation albums, 2 live albums, 1 extended play, 34 singles and 22 music videos.

== Albums ==
=== Studio albums ===
Title	Album details	Peak chart positions										Certifications
Title	Album details	US	AUS	AUT	CAN	GER	NOR	NZ	SWE	SWI	UK	Certifications
Core	Released: September 29, 1992; Label: Atlantic; Formats: CD, CS, LP, digital download	3	29	21	8	53	20	11	9	36	27	RIAA: 8× Platinum; ARIA: Platinum; BPI: Silver; MC: 2× Platinum; RMNZ: Platinum
Purple	Released: June 7, 1994; Label: Atlantic; Formats: CD, CS, LP, digital download	1	1	18	2	15	11	3	6	25	10	RIAA: 6× Platinum; ARIA: 2× Platinum; BPI: Gold; MC: 3× Platinum; RMNZ: Platinum
Tiny Music... Songs from the Vatican Gift Shop	Released: March 26, 1996; Label: Atlantic; Formats: CD, CS, LP	4	3	37	5	47	27	4	27	41	31	RIAA: 2× Platinum; ARIA: Gold; MC: Platinum; RMNZ: Gold
No. 4	Released: October 26, 1999; Label: Atlantic; Formats: CD, LP	6	21	—	5	41	—	33	—	—	101	RIAA: Platinum; MC: Platinum
Shangri-La Dee Da	Released: June 19, 2001; Label: Atlantic; Formats: CD, LP	9	35	—	5	72	—	—	—	—	105	RIAA: Gold; MC: Gold
Stone Temple Pilots	Released: May 25, 2010; Label: Atlantic; Formats: CD, LP	2	21	54	2	52	—	6	—	36	80	
Stone Temple Pilots	Released: March 16, 2018; Label: Rhino; Formats: CD, LP, digital download	24	38	—	36	94	—	—	—	44	—	
Perdida	Released: February 7, 2020; Label: Rhino; Formats: CD, LP, digital download	—	— (Note: Perdida did not enter the ARIA Albums Chart, but peaked at number 18 on the ARIA Digital Album Chart.)	—	—	—	—	—	—	70	—	
"—" denotes a recording that did not chart or was not released in that territory.

=== Compilation albums ===
Title	Album details	Peak chart positions		Certifications
Title	Album details	US	CAN	Certifications
Thank You	Released: November 11, 2003; Label: Atlantic; Formats: CD, LP	26	40	ARIA: Gold; RMNZ: Gold
Buy This	Released: November 25, 2008; Label: Atlantic; Formats: CD	—	—	
Original Album Series	Released: September 17, 2012; Label: Rhino; Formats: CD box set	—	—	
"—" denotes a recording that did not chart or was not released in that territory.

=== Live albums ===
Title	Album details
Alive in the Windy City	Released: June 26, 2012; Label: Eagle Rock; Formats: DVD, Blu-ray
Live 2018	Released: November 23, 2018; Label: Rhino; Formats: LP

== EPs ==
Title	EP details	Peak chart positions
Title	EP details	US
High Rise (with Chester Bennington)	Released: October 8, 2013; Label: Play Pen, LLC; Formats: CD, digital download	21

== Singles ==
Title	Year	Peak chart positions										Certifications	Album
Title	Year	US	US Alt.	US Main. Rock	US Rock	AUS	CAN	NLD	NZ	SWE	UK	Certifications	Album
"Sex Type Thing"	1992	—	—	23	— (Note: "Sex Type Thing" did not enter the Hot Rock Songs chart, but peaked at number 28 on the Rock Digital Song Sales chart.)	138	—	—	—	—	55		Core
"Plush"	1993	— (Note: "Plush" did not enter the Billboard Hot 100, but peaked at number 39 on the Hot 100 Airplay chart.)	9	1	7	47	21	15	23	18	23	BPI: Silver; RMNZ: 2× Platinum	Core
"Creep"	1993	— (Note: "Creep" did not enter the Billboard Hot 100, but peaked at number 59 on the Hot 100 Airplay chart.)	12	2	12	76	45	—	24	—	—	RMNZ: Platinum	Core
"Vasoline"	1994	— (Note: "Vasoline" did not enter the Billboard Hot 100, but peaked at number 38 on the Hot 100 Airplay chart.)	2	1	— (Note: "Vasoline" did not enter the Hot Rock Songs chart, but peaked at number 20 on the Rock Digital Song Sales chart.)	24	21	—	28	—	48	RMNZ: Gold	Purple
"Interstate Love Song"	1994	— (Note: "Interstate Love Song" did not enter the Billboard Hot 100, but peaked at number 18 on the Hot 100 Airplay chart.)	2	1	9	50	20	—	47	—	53	BPI: Silver; RMNZ: 2× Platinum	Purple
"Big Empty"	1995	— (Note: "Big Empty" did not enter the Billboard Hot 100, but peaked at number 50 on the Hot 100 Airplay chart.)	7	3	— (Note: "Big Empty" did not enter the Hot Rock Songs chart, but peaked at number 24 on the Rock Digital Song Sales chart.)	63	—	—	47	—	—		Purple
"Big Bang Baby"	1996	— (Note: "Big Bang Baby did not enter the Billboard Hot 100, but peaked at number 28 on the Hot 100 Airplay chart.)	2	1	—	37	18	—	—	—	154		Tiny Music...
"Trippin' on a Hole in a Paper Heart"	1996	— (Note: "Trippin' on a Hole in a Paper Heart" did not enter the Billboard Hot 100, but peaked at number 36 on the Hot 100 Airplay chart.)	3	1	— (Note: "Trippin' on a Hole in a Paper Heart" did not enter the Hot Rock Songs chart, but peaked at number 16 on the Hard Rock Digital Song Sales chart.)	—	—	—	—	—	—		Tiny Music...
"Lady Picture Show"	1996	— (Note: "Lady Picture Show" did not enter the Billboard Hot 100, but peaked at number 53 on the Hot 100 Airplay chart.)	6	1	—	—	—	—	—	—	—		Tiny Music...
"Down"	1999	— (Note: "Down" did not enter the Billboard Hot 100, but peaked at number seven on the Bubbling Under Hot 100 Singles chart.)	9	5	—	—	—	—	33	—	—		No. 4
"Sour Girl"	2000	78	3	4	— (Note: "Sour Girl" did not enter the Hot Rock Songs chart, but peaked at number 36 on the Rock Digital Song Sales chart.)	66	—	—	—	—	—		No. 4
"Break on Through (To the Other Side)"	2000	—	—	35	—	—	—	—	—	—	—		Stoned Immaculate: The Music of The Doors
"Days of the Week"	2001	— (Note: "Days of the Week" did not enter the Billboard Hot 100, but peaked at number one on the Bubbling Under Hot 100 Singles chart.)	5	4	—	—	20	—	—	—	—		Shangri-La Dee Da
"Hollywood Bitch"	2001	—	29	25	—	—	—	—	—	—	—		Shangri-La Dee Da
"Revolution"	2001	—	—	30	—	—	3	—	—	—	—		Non-album single
"All in the Suit That You Wear"	2003	— (Note: "All in the Suit That You Wear" did not enter the Billboard Hot 100, but peaked at number 18 on the Bubbling Under Hot 100 Singles chart.)	19	5	—	—	—	—	—	—	—		Thank You
"Between the Lines"	2010	— (Note: "Between the Lines" did not enter the Billboard Hot 100, but peaked at number three on the Bubbling Under Hot 100 Singles chart.)	1	2	1	—	50	—	—	—	—		Stone Temple Pilots (2010)
"Take a Load Off"	2010	—	24	23	24	—	—	—	—	—	—		Stone Temple Pilots (2010)
"Meadow"	2017	—	—	6	— (Note: "Meadow" did not enter the Hot Rock Songs chart, but peaked at number 21 on the Rock Airplay chart.)	—	—	—	—	—	—		Stone Temple Pilots (2018)
"Roll Me Under"	2018	—	—	16	— (Note: "Roll Me Under" did not enter the Hot Rock Songs chart, but peaked at number 40 on the Rock Airplay chart.)	—	—	—	—	—	—		Stone Temple Pilots (2018)
"Fare Thee Well"	2019	—	—	34	—	—	—	—	—	—	—		Perdida
"—" denotes a recording that did not chart or was not released in that territory.

=== Promotional singles ===
Title	Year	Peak chart positions					Album
Title	Year	US Alt.	US Main. Rock	US Rock	CAN	MEX	Album
"Dead & Bloated"	1992	—	—	— (Note: "Dead & Bloated" did not enter the Hot Rock Songs chart, but peaked at number 49 on the Rock Digital Song Sales chart.)	—	—	Core
"Crackerman"	1992	—	—	—	—	—	Core
"Wicked Garden"	1992	—	11	— (Note: "Wicked Garden" did not enter the Hot Rock Songs chart, but peaked at number 14 on the Hard Rock Digital Song Sales chart.)	—	—	Core
"Unglued"	1994	16	8	—	64	—	Purple
"Pretty Penny"	1995	—	12	—	—	—	Purple
"Dancing Days"	1995	— (Note: "Dancing Days" did not enter the Billboard Hot 100, but peaked at number 63 on the Hot 100 Airplay chart.)	11	3	46	—	Encomium: A Tribute to Led Zeppelin
"Tumble in the Rough"	1996	36	9	—	60	—	Tiny Music...
"Art School Girl"	1997	—	—	—	—	—	Tiny Music...
"Heaven & Hot Rods"	1999	30	17	—	—	—	No. 4
"No Way Out"	2000	24	17	—	—	—	No. 4
"Wonderful" (featuring Chester Bennington)	2002	—	—	—	—	—	The Family Values Tour 2001
"Plush" (Acoustic)	2003	—	—	—	—	—	Thank You
"Cinnamon"	2010	—	—	—	—	—	Stone Temple Pilots (2010)
"Out of Time"	2013	—	1	—	—	—	High Rise
"Black Heart"	2013	—	13	—	—	—	High Rise
"The Art of Letting Go"	2018	—	—	—	—	—	Stone Temple Pilots (2018)
"Never Enough"	2018	—	—	—	—	36	Stone Temple Pilots (2018)
"Three Wishes"	2020	—	—	—	—	—	Perdida
"Perdida"	2020	—	—	—	—	—	Perdida
"—" denotes a recording that did not chart or was not released in that territory.

== Music videos ==
Year	Song	Director(s)
1992	"Sex Type Thing"	Josh Taft
1993	"Plush"	Josh Taft
1993	"Wicked Garden"	Graeme Joyce
1993	"Creep"	Graeme Joyce
1994	"Vasoline"	Kevin Kerslake
1994	"Interstate Love Song"	Kevin Kerslake
1996	"Big Bang Baby"	John Eder
1996	"Trippin' on a Hole in a Paper Heart"	Bernardo Santini
1996	"Lady Picture Show"	Josh Taft
1999	"Down"	Robert Hales & Mark Racco
2000	"Sour Girl"	David Slade
2000	"No Way Out"	Bart Lipton
2001	"Days of the Week"	Kevin Kerslake
2001	"Hello, It's Late"	Chapman Baehler
2001	"Revolution"	Chapman Baehler
2010	"Between the Lines"	Christopher Sims
2010	"Take a Load Off"	
2011	"Cinnamon" (Version 1)	Aggressive
2011	"Cinnamon" (Version 2)	Dennis Roberts
2014	"Black Heart"	Glendon and Isabella
2020	"Fare Thee Well"	P. R. Brown
2020	"Thought She'd Be Mine"	
2021	"And So I Know"	Stone Temple Pilots
