= Perdida (album) =

Studio album by Stone Temple Pilots
- Released: February 7, 2020
- Recorded: 2019
- Genres: Acoustic rock; soft rock; country; folk; orchestral pop
- Length: 45:26
- Label: Rhino
- Producer: Stone Temple Pilots

Stone Temple Pilots chronology
Live 2018 (2018)	Perdida (2020)

Singles from Perdida
- 1. "Fare Thee Well" Released: December 2, 2019

Perdida is the eighth studio album by the American rock band Stone Temple Pilots, released through Rhino on February 7, 2020. It is the band's second album with Jeff Gutt as lead singer and is "an acoustic record largely recorded on vintage instruments." The first single "Fare Thee Well" was released on December 2, 2019.

== Critical reception ==
Professional ratings
Aggregate scores
Source	Rating
Metacritic	70/100
Review scores
Source	Rating
AllMusic	4/5 stars
Ghost Cult	9/10
Louder Sound	4/5 stars
Metal Hammer (de)	5.5/7
Paste	8.5/10
Rolling Stone	2/5 stars

Perdida received "generally favorable reviews" according to Metacritic. Paste described the album as "the sound of a band stretching beyond its own self-imposed limits to challenge what a so-called 'acoustic album' can be", commenting on its "seamless blend of country, British and Mariachi folk, orchestral pop and soft rock."

Spin surmised that "this could be the start of a new career path for STP" in a positive review of the album. AllMusic critic Neil Z. Yeung described the album's music as "weathered, weary, and surprisingly beautiful" but "does its best to find hope in the darkness."

Rolling Stone was less enthusiastic about the album, giving it two out of five stars and noted that "unfortunately, by going acoustic—even with a wide palate of instruments like the keyboard, Marxophone, and, of course, flute—Stone Temple Pilots have made an album that's generic."

== Track listing ==
Perdida track listing
No.	Title	Writer(s)	Length
1.	"Fare Thee Well"	Robert DeLeo, Jeff Gutt	4:21
2.	"Three Wishes"	Dean DeLeo, Gutt	4:51
3.	"Perdida"	R. DeLeo, Gutt	3:29
4.	"I Didn't Know the Time"	D. DeLeo, Gutt	5:31
5.	"Years"	R. DeLeo	3:30
6.	"She's My Queen"	R. DeLeo, Gutt	4:41
7.	"Miles Away"	R. DeLeo, Gutt	4:56
8.	"You Found Yourself While Losing Your Heart"	D. DeLeo, Gutt	5:43
9.	"I Once Sat at Your Table" (Instrumental)	D. DeLeo	1:56
10.	"Sunburst"	D. DeLeo, Gutt	6:28
Total length:			45:26

Japanese edition (bonus tracks)
No.	Title	Lyrics	Music	Length
11.	"Big Empty" (Acoustic Live, 2018)	Scott Weiland	D. DeLeo	3:53
12.	"Interstate Love Song" (Acoustic Live, 2018)	Weiland	R. DeLeo	3:35
13.	"Pretty Penny" (Acoustic Live, 2018)	Weiland	D. DeLeo	3:34
Total length:				56:35

== Personnel ==
=== Stone Temple Pilots ===
- Jeff Gutt – lead vocals (1–4, 6–8, 10)
- Dean DeLeo – guitars (2, 9), acoustic guitar (3, 4, 7, 8, 10), electric guitars (1, 4, 8, 10), percussion (4, 8, 10)
- Robert DeLeo – bass (1–8, 10), acoustic guitar (1, 6), nylon-string acoustic guitar (3, 5, 7), 6-string bass (3), keyboards (3, 7), marxophone (6, 7), percussion (1, 3, 6), lead vocals (5)
- Eric Kretz – drums (1, 4, 5, 7, 8, 10), percussion (2, 3, 6, 7)

=== Additional musicians ===
- Bill Appleberry – keyboards (1, 3–5, 7, 8, 10)
- Tiffany Brown – background vocals (1, 6, 8)
- Adrienne 'Aeb' Byrne – flute (4, 6)
- Erin Breene – cello (3)
- Yutong Sharpe – violin (3, 7)
- Joy Simpson – background vocals (1, 6, 8)
- Chris Speed – alto saxophone (5)
- Julle Staudhamaer – viola (3)

=== Technical personnel and design ===
- Stone Temple Pilots – producers
- Ryan Williams – engineering, mixing
- Bruce Nelson – guitar technician
- JJ Golden – mastering
- Dean DeLeo – art direction, design
- Rory Wilson – art direction, design
- Charles Leutwiler – cover photo

== Charts ==
Chart performance for Perdida
Chart (2020)	Peak position
Australian Digital Albums (ARIA)	18
Belgian Albums (Ultratop Flanders)	181
Japanese Albums (Oricon)	156
Scottish Albums (Official Charts)	62
Swiss Albums (Schweizer Hitparade)	70
US Top Alternative Albums (Billboard)	21
US Top Album Sales (Billboard)	13
US Top Rock Albums (Billboard)	37
