= Unglued (song) =

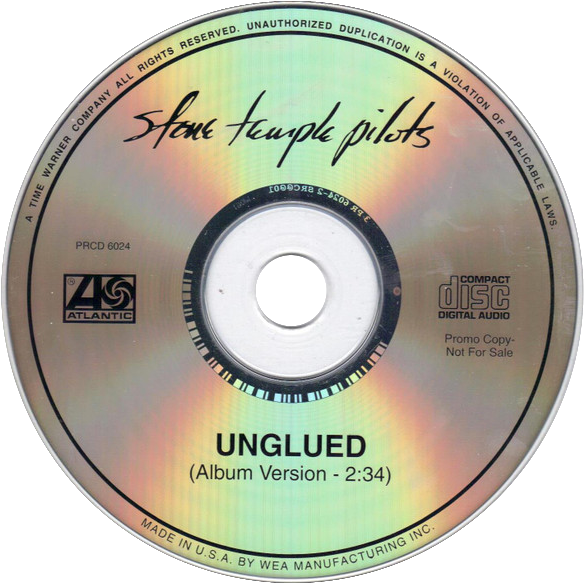
- US promotional CD single

Promotional single by Stone Temple Pilots

from the album Purple
- Released: 1994
- Recorded: 1994
- Genre: Grunge; garage rock
- Length: 2:35
- Label: Atlantic
- Composers: Scott Weiland; Robert DeLeo
- Lyricist: Scott Weiland

Stone Temple Pilots promotional single chronology
| "Wicked Garden" (1992) | "Unglued" (1994) | "Pretty Penny" (1995) |

Audio sample
- "Unglued": file; help

"Unglued" is a song by the American rock band Stone Temple Pilots from their second studio album, Purple (1994). It was performed live on the Late Show with David Letterman in December 1994. STP had appeared on Letterman twice before, to perform their songs "Wicked Garden" and "Vasoline", and would appear four more times. The song, like "Vasoline", is known for its highly distorted guitar intro and prominent bass. "Unglued" was only a minor hit for the band, but can still be heard on radio stations in the United States and remains a staple in their live shows. This is the last song Scott Weiland performed before he died.

== Charts ==
| Chart (1995) | Peak position |
|---|---|
| Canada Top Singles (RPM) | 64 |
| US Mainstream Rock (Billboard) | 8 |
| US Alternative Airplay (Billboard) | 16 |
