= The Family Values Tour 2001 =

Live album by Various Artists
- Released: May 7, 2002
- Recorded: 2001
- Genre: Nu metal; grunge
- Length: 52:31
- Label: Elektra
- Producer: Josh Abraham

Various Artists chronology
The Family Values Tour 1999 (2000)	The Family Values Tour 2001 (2002)	Family Values Tour 2006 (2006)

The Family Values Tour 2001 is the third live album with various artists performing on stage during The Family Values Tour in fall 2001. It is released on May 7, 2002. The album includes various artists performing at the Family Values Tour in 2001, such as Linkin Park, Staind, Deadsy, Stone Temple Pilots, Static-X, and Staind frontman Aaron Lewis. The hit song "Wonderful", the only single from the album, is performed live during the Family Values 2001 Tour by American rock band Stone Temple Pilots, which features additional vocals from Chester Bennington of Linkin Park who would eventually become the band's vocalist in 2013 until 2015.

== Background ==
The Family Values 2001 Tour was recorded live at assorted dates on the annual alt-metal tour. While it's heavy on the rock of Stone Temple Pilots, the album does include some other strong performances. Staind vocalist Aaron Lewis, who made his name with some standout performances during the 1999 Family Values Tour outing, returns here with an acoustic version of Pearl Jam's "Black." He also assists Linkin Park with a take on "One Step Closer," and fronts his own band for two songs.

The album was produced by Josh Abraham, before his collaboration with Linkin Park on Reanimation (2002) and Live in Texas (2003), while executive production was handled by American nu metal band Korn and Jeff Kwatinetz. The tracks by various artists in the album were recorded live on The Family Values Tour, in the fall of 2001.

== Track listing ==
No.	Title	Writer(s)	Performer(s)	Length
1.	"Vasoline"	Stone Temple Pilots (music), Scott Weiland (lyrics)	Stone Temple Pilots	3:13
2.	"Runaway"	Linkin Park, Mark Wakefield	Linkin Park	3:03
3.	"Fade"	Aaron Lewis, Mike Mushok, Johnny April, Jon Wysocki	Staind	4:32
4.	"Wonderful" (featuring Chester Bennington)	Robert DeLeo, Scott Weiland	Stone Temple Pilots	4:15
5.	"Push It" (featuring P. Exeter Blue)	Static-X	Static-X	3:41
6.	"It's Been Awhile"	Aaron Lewis, Mike Mushok, Johnny April, Jon Wysocki	Staind	4:33
7.	"Wicked Garden"	Robert DeLeo & Dean DeLeo (music), Scott Weiland (lyrics)	Stone Temple Pilots	5:13
8.	"Cold"	Static-X	Static-X	4:21
9.	"Black" (Pearl Jam cover)	Stone Gossard, Eddie Vedder	Aaron Lewis	5:12
10.	"Creep" (featuring Aaron Lewis)	Robert DeLeo (music & lyrics), Scott Weiland (lyrics)	Stone Temple Pilots	6:51
11.	"Tom Sawyer" (Rush cover)	Geddy Lee, Alex Lifeson, Neil Peart, Pye Dubois	Deadsy	4:11
12.	"One Step Closer" (featuring Aaron Lewis)	Linkin Park	Linkin Park	3:50
Total length:				50:95

== Reception ==
- AllMusic
