= Meadow (song) =

Single by Stone Temple Pilots

from the album Stone Temple Pilots
- Released: November 15, 2017
- Recorded: 2016–2017
- Genre: Hard rock
- Length: 3:29
- Label: Atlantic, Rhino
- Songwriter(s): Dean DeLeo; Robert DeLeo; Eric Kretz; Jeff Gutt

Stone Temple Pilots singles chronology
"Take a Load Off" (2010)	"Meadow" (2017)	"Roll Me Under" (2018)

"Meadow" is a song by American rock band Stone Temple Pilots. It is their debut single off their eponymous seventh studio album. The song is the first released by the band to feature new singer Jeff Gutt after the departure and deaths of prior vocalists Scott Weiland and Chester Bennington. It peaked at number 6 on the Billboard Mainstream Rock Songs chart in 2018.

== Background ==
"Meadow" is the first Stone Temple Pilots song to feature new singer Jeff Gutt, who was chosen by the band out of 15,000 applicants after the year spanning search for a new singer after the departures and deaths of prior vocalists Scott Weiland and Chester Bennington. The song was debuted live, at Gutt's first concert with the band, on November 14, 2017, at a private, invite-only show, with the studio recording of the song being released the following day. The song is the lead single from the band's seventh studio album, which was released on March 16, 2018. A lyric video was released a month later, on December 15, 2017.

The song's instrumental track was originally written by the band's remaining original members - guitarist Dean DeLeo, bassist Robert DeLeo, and drummer Eric Kretz - prior to Gutt's audition for the band in September 2016. The song was presented to Gutt as part of the auditioning process; the band played him the song, and he was tasked, on the spot, to see what he would do with the song. Gutt was able to come up with the vocal melody on the spot, and was able to write the songs later down the road. Gutt's ability to write the lyrics and melody of the song, alongside a few other songs, is what made the band decide that he should be the new lead singer.

== Themes and composition ==
Gutt's vocals are described as having a deep, nasal-toned quality to them, sounding similar to Weiland without sounding like an exact clone. Rolling Stone described the track as a "churning hard rocker. Kretz stated that the band aimed to capture a more modern take on Stone Temple Pilots music while retaining the elements of their prior work at the same time.

== Personnel ==
- Jeff Gutt – lead vocals
- Dean DeLeo – guitar
- Robert DeLeo – bass
- Eric Kretz – drums

== Charts ==
Chart (2017–18)	Peak position
Canada Rock (Billboard)	10
US Rock & Alternative Airplay (Billboard)	21
