= Vaseline (disambiguation) =

Vaseline is a trademarked brand of petroleum jelly.

Vaseline may also refer to:

- Petroleum jelly, called by the brand name Vaseline due to trademark genericization
- "Vaseline", a song by Elastica from Elastica
- The Vaselines, a Scottish rock band

== See also ==
- Uranium glass or Vaseline glass
- "Vasoline", a 1994 song by Stone Temple Pilots
