= Big Empty =

- Australian CD picture sleeve

Single by Stone Temple Pilots

from the album The Crow: Original Motion Picture Soundtrack and Purple
- B-side: "Lounge Fly"
- Released: March 20, 1995
- Recorded: May 25, 1993
- Studio: Record Plant (Los Angels)
- Genre: Grunge; alternative rock; hard rock; blues rock
- Length: 4:55
- Label: Atlantic
- Composer: Dean DeLeo
- Lyricist: Scott Weiland
- Producer: Brendan O'Brien

Stone Temple Pilots singles chronology
"Interstate Love Song" (1994)	"Big Empty" (1995)	"Big Bang Baby" (1996)

Audio sample
- file; help

"Big Empty" is a song by American rock band Stone Temple Pilots that first appeared in 1994 on the soundtrack of the film The Crow. The band later included the song on their second album, Purple (1994), and was released as the album's final single only in Australia on March 20, 1995. The song reached No. 3 and No. 7 on the Billboard Mainstream Rock Tracks and Modern Rock Tracks charts, respectively. The song won an MTV Movie Award for best song featured in a movie in 1995.

Musically, the song has a similar format to one of the band's previous singles "Creep", beginning with a slow, soft acoustic verse that leads into a loud and distorted chorus with a heavy guitar similar to "Plush". "Big Empty" appears on the greatest hits compilation albums Thank You and Buy This.

== Critical reception ==
"Big Empty" received positive responses in reviews of The Crow: Original Motion Picture Soundtrack (1994). Upon the soundtrack's release, The Hard Report described the song as a "newest gem" and predicted that "many more of you will be quickly following to play" it after its big first week. In the subsequent week's issue, the publication reported strong radio response, with KDJK's Beaver Brown calling the tune "a really great song…the gem of the soundtrack", while WKLQ's Dave Wellington said, "The phones have been real positive…Can't go wrong. Smash." While Michael Saunders of The Boston Globe referred to "Big Empty" as the soundtrack's "anthem", Todd Jirousek of The Plain Dealer, however, wrote that the song "is not as representative of the movie as most of the other tunes", even if it "has won the most radio play of all the songs on the soundtrack".

Retrospective commentary on "Big Empty" in reviews of Purple has remained positive, with some critics identifying it as a highlight of the album. In the All Music Guide: The Definitive Guide to Popular Music (2001), Stephen Thomas Erlewine identified it as one of Purple's "two masterpieces", alongside "Interstate Love Song", writing that "mainstream hard rock didn't get better than these two cuts". Similarly, Jack Mancuso of Sputnikmusic described it as the best song on the album, calling it "perhaps Weiland's shining moment as a vocalist; grandiose, uplifting and just all-out bombastic". He added that it is "written masterfully" and "one of the best songs of the nineties". Mancuso concluded: "Songs like 'Big Empty' are why I feel STP don't get enough recognition, you'd never see other bands from this time period write something so unflinchingly ambitious while still appealing to and marketing toward a mainstream audience."

"Big Empty" is regarded as one of Stone Temple Pilots' best songs by both fans and critics. In a Revolver fan poll, the song was voted number one among the band's tracks, with Gregory Adams commenting that its release "had fans positively salivating for whatever was next" ahead of Purple. It has also ranked high on lists of the band's best songs, including number three on Loudwire's and number six on American Songwriter's top ten. Shawn Christ of Paste placed "Big Empty" at number 27 on a list of the 50 best grunge songs, writing that "with Weiland crooning lines like 'Too much trippin' and my soul's worn thin' and Dean DeLeo's slithering guitar work, the track is easily one of the band's best." The song also reached number three in Rolling Stone's readers' poll of the best Scott Weiland songs and was included in Rolling Stone's list of his 20 essential tracks.

== Live performances ==
The song was performed live for the first time during a taping of MTV Unplugged on November 17, 1993, seven months before Purple was released. "Big Empty" was not included when their Unplugged episode debuted in January 1994. However, in May to help promote The Crow soundtrack, MTV placed the Unplugged performance of "Big Empty" into their heavy video rotation, as there was never an official promo video for the song. On STP's 2008 reunion tour, "Big Empty" was the opening song for every show except for the band's performance at the Virgin Mobile Festival in Baltimore on August 10.

== Charts ==
=== Weekly charts ===
Chart (1994–1995)	Peak position
Australia (ARIA)	63
New Zealand (Recorded Music NZ)	47
US Radio Songs (Billboard)	50
US Alternative Airplay (Billboard)	7
US Mainstream Rock (Billboard)	3

=== Year-end charts ===
Chart (1994)	Position
US Album Rock Tracks (Billboard)	10
US Modern Rock Tracks (Billboard)	36

== Release history ==
Release dates and formats for "Big Empty"
Region	Date	Format(s)	Label(s)	Ref.
Australia	March 20, 1995	CD; cassette	Atlantic	
