= Creep (Stone Temple Pilots song) =

1993 single by Stone Temple Pilots

- European commercial CD release

Single by Stone Temple Pilots

from the album Core
- B-side: "Crackerman"; "Where the River Goes"
- Released: November 1, 1993
- Genre: Alternative rock; folk; grunge
- Length: 5:33 (album version); 4:31 (radio edit); 5:01 (music video edit)
- Label: Atlantic
- Composer: Robert DeLeo
- Lyricists: Scott Weiland; Robert DeLeo
- Producer: Brendan O'Brien

Stone Temple Pilots singles chronology
"Plush" (1993)	"Creep" (1993)	"Vasoline" (1994)

Music video
- "Creep" on YouTube

"Creep" is a song by the American rock band Stone Temple Pilots, appearing as the seventh track off the band's debut album, Core (1992), and later released as the third and final single. The song also appears on the band's greatest hits album, Thank You. A live version featuring Aaron Lewis is included on The Family Values 2001 Tour release.

== Composition ==
"Creep" has been described as a ballad. In a November 2014 interview with Songfacts, Scott Weiland said, "That's just the idea of being a young person somewhere, caught between still being a kid and becoming a young man. It's that youth apathy, that second-guessing yourself, not feeling like you fit in."

== Track listing ==
1. "Creep" [New Radio Version] - 4:31
2. "Crackerman" - 3:12
3. "Where the River Goes" - 8:20

=== German track listing ===
1. Creep
2. Dead and Bloated
3. Piece of Pie

== Charts ==
=== Weekly charts ===
Chart (1994)	Peak position
Australia (ARIA)	76
Canada Top Singles (RPM)	45
New Zealand (Recorded Music NZ)	24
US Radio Songs (Billboard)	59
US Alternative Airplay (Billboard)	12
US Mainstream Rock (Billboard)	2

Chart (2015)	Peak position
US Hot Rock & Alternative Songs (Billboard)	12

=== Year-end charts ===
Chart (1994)	Position
US Album Rock Tracks (Billboard)	16

== Certifications ==
Region	Certification	Certified units/sales
New Zealand (RMNZ)	Platinum	30,000^{‡}
^{‡} Sales+streaming figures based on certification alone.

== Release history ==
Region	Date	Format(s)	Label(s)	Ref.
United States	November 1, 1993	Radio	Atlantic	
Australia	January 10, 1994	CD; cassette	Atlantic	
