= Wicked Garden =

- US promotional single release

Promotional single by Stone Temple Pilots

from the album Core
- Released: July 19, 1993
- Recorded: May 1992
- Studio: Rumbo Recorders (Los Angeles)
- Genre: Grunge; acid rock; alternative metal; alternative rock; psychedelic rock
- Length: 4:06
- Label: Atlantic
- Composers: Robert DeLeo; Dean DeLeo
- Lyricist: Scott Weiland
- Producer: Brendan O'Brien

Stone Temple Pilots promotional singles chronology
"Crackerman" (1992)	"Wicked Garden" (1993)	"Unglued" (1994)

Audio sample
- "Wicked Garden": file; help

Music video
- "Wicked Garden" on YouTube

"Wicked Garden" is a song by American rock band Stone Temple Pilots from their debut studio album, Core (1992). The lyrics are about lost innocence and longing for youth. Despite the song never being released as a commercial single, it is still considered to be one of the band's biggest hits and is performed at their live shows. The song's lyrics were written by Scott Weiland and the music was written by brothers Robert and Dean DeLeo. A promotional video also received regular rotation on MTV.

== Release ==
"Wicked Garden" was released to US radio by Atlantic Records on July 19, 1993. The label also planned to release a five-track extended play (EP) of the song in stores on August 17. However, Rhino noted that "Wicked Garden" was never commercially released as a single.

== Music video ==
Despite the song never seeing a commercial release, a promotional music video for "Wicked Garden" was shot in 1993 as a follow-up to "Plush" and received heavy rotation on MTV during the grunge era. Filmed at the SOMA in San Diego, it features the band performing the song at a club and also serves as a visual interpretation of the lyrics, as shown with a young impoverished girl living in a barn.

== Other versions ==
- An original version of "Wicked Garden" appeared on the Mighty Joe Young Demo in 1990.
- Stone Temple Pilots performed an acoustic version of "Wicked Garden" on MTV Unplugged in 1993, which aired in January 1994. The video of this version appears on Thank You DVD and the Unplugged sessions would be released as part of the 25th Anniversary Deluxe Edition of Core in 2017.
- The band also performed the song on the Late Show with David Letterman on September 17, 1993.
- A live version of the song appears on the soundtrack for the 2001 Family Values Tour.

== Chart positions ==
Chart (1993)	Peak Position
US Mainstream Rock Airplay (Billboard)	11
US Alternative Airplay (Billboard)	21

== Release history ==
Release dates and formats for "Wicked Garden"
Region	Date	Format(s)	Label(s)	Ref.
United States	July 19, 1993	Radio	Atlantic	
