= Purple (Stone Temple Pilots album) =

Studio album by Stone Temple Pilots
- Released: June 7, 1994
- Recorded: May 25, 1993 (Note: "Big Empty"); July 12, 1993 (Note: "Lounge Fly"); March 1994
- Studios: Southern Tracks (Atlanta); Record Plant (Los Angeles); Paisley Park (Chanhassen); Harptone (Note: According to the album's liner notes, "Pretty Penny" was recorded at Harptone Studios. The drummer Eric Kretz has also recalled recording the song at the home of Clay Harper, though he did not refer to it by name.)
- Genres: Grunge; alternative rock; hard rock; psychedelic rock
- Length: 46:59
- Label: Atlantic
- Producer: Brendan O'Brien

Stone Temple Pilots chronology
Core (1992)	Purple (1994)	Tiny Music... Songs from the Vatican Gift Shop (1996)

Singles from Purple
- 1. "Vasoline" Released: May 25, 1994; 2. "Interstate Love Song" Released: August 1994; 3. "Big Empty" Released: March 20, 1995 (AUS)

Purple (stylized on the cover art in its Chinese character 紫) is the second studio album by the American rock band Stone Temple Pilots, released on June 7, 1994, by Atlantic Records. Expanding on the band's grunge roots, the album incorporates more genres, such as psychedelic rock, blues rock, and country. The band started work on the album while touring for their debut, Core (1992). The song "Big Empty" was recorded on May 25, 1993 and appeared in the 1994 film The Crow, while the rest of the album was recorded in March 1994.

Purple was a major commercial success, debuting at number 1 on the Billboard 200, and remaining at the top of the chart for three weeks, with 252,000 copies sold in its first week. The album spawned a number of successful singles; "Vasoline" and "Interstate Love Song" both topped the Mainstream Rock Tracks chart and reached number 2 on the Modern Rock Tracks chart, while "Big Empty" also reached the top ten on both charts. Lesser-known album cuts "Pretty Penny" and "Unglued" were released as promotional singles to success on rock charts.

While receiving mixed-to-negative reviews on release, Purple is retrospectively seen as one of the best albums of the 1990s, with Ultimate Classic Rock declaring it a "psychedelic grunge opus." The album has since been certified 6× Platinum by the Recording Industry Association of America (RIAA). In 2019, to celebrate its 25th anniversary, a Super Deluxe Edition with remasters, demos and live performances was released. A summer tour to celebrate the album's 30th anniversary started on August 16, 2024, and ended on September 15, with the band performing the entire album each night.

== Recording ==
The recording of Purple began in the wake of Stone Temple Pilots' extensive touring behind their 1992 debut album, Core. Material for the follow-up had already started to take shape while the band was still on the road. On May 25, 1993, the band recorded "Big Empty" for the 1994 film The Crow at the Record Plant in Los Angeles. On July 12 they recorded "Lounge Fly" at Paisley Park Studios in Chanhassen with the producer Brendan O'Brien. Following a short break after touring, the band reconvened in Los Angeles in early 1994, spending time in a rehearsal space where they worked out song structures and arrangements. After this period of preparation, they traveled to Atlanta for pre-production with O'Brien. Recording began shortly afterward at Southern Tracks Recording Studio, located on the outskirts of the city.

According to Blender, upon arriving in Atlanta, the singer, Scott Weiland's first priority was finding a drug dealer. At this stage, his drug use did not affect his performances, but it contributed to a growing distance between him and the other members. "It was creatively the best experience we could have had... but on a communication level, it wasn't the greatest," Weiland later said, adding that "the camaraderie wasn't there the way it had been on the first record". Despite this, the sessions were marked by efficiency and a fast pace. The album was recorded, mixed, and mastered in approximately three and a half weeks during March 1994, with basic tracking completed in the first ten days and mixing taking an additional five. The band entered the studio with the material well-rehearsed and used a process that involved tracking with a public address system to simulate a live environment. This method was encouraged by O'Brien, who aimed to capture performances quickly and with minimal second-guessing. The recording environment was relatively informal. The band stayed near the studio to avoid travel delays, and downtime often included recreational activities like basketball and wiffle ball in the parking lot. These breaks served as a way to decompress between sessions.

In at least one case, the band moved outside the formal studio setting to record. For "Pretty Penny", O'Brien arranged for them to record at Harptone Studios using a two-inch eight-track tape machine. The informal space made the group feel at ease, especially after their MTV Unplugged performance. The session took place in a living room, where the band recorded the track live with minimal overdubs in a short time. As the drummer Eric Kretz put it, "And that's how that song should be, and this is where Brendan shines extra bright with his ideas." During the main sessions, Weiland often joined after the instrumental work had been completed. He recorded his vocals in the evenings, after the rest of the band had finished their parts for the day. O'Brien handled these vocal sessions with Weiland separately from the group's daytime tracking. Despite this split schedule, Weiland completed all of his vocals in just one week.

The band worked with minimal oversight from their record label. According to the members, Atlantic Records gave them considerable creative latitude during the process. O'Brien also preferred to keep industry personnel out of the studio, a practice the label respected. Despite some interpersonal strain during the sessions, partly attributed to fatigue after over a year of touring, the band completed the album as planned. At one point, members briefly considered halting the process, but ultimately regrouped and finished the recording. In retrospect, the group described these tensions as typical of their circumstances at the time, rather than as signs of lasting conflict. Shortly afterward, Weiland entered treatment, officially described as "psychological fatigue", though he later acknowledged it was his first attempt at drug detoxification.

== Composition ==
"Core came out and it took off. I don’t think we were really prepared for that. We went out on the road and supported that record for 14 months. During that time, we were writing. I wrote 'Interstate Love Song' in the back of an RV on a little 20 dollar nylon string guitar. There were some lyrical things that Scott [Weiland] got into. 'Meatplow' and songs like that, which were his reaction to what the business was trying to do to the band. You know, there is that thing called the 'business' to the music business. When you put that together with music, it doesn’t always work. But we were quickly and rapidly discovering what the business side of the music was."

— Robert DeLeo on the album's composition

Purple has been described as the album that "put grunge out of its misery," combining the alternative rock and hard rock of Core, with a wider range of musical influences. This includes: acoustic, blues rock, country, folk, funk, jazz, psychedelic rock and Southern rock. According to Jack Mancuso of Sputnikmusic, the album is characterized by a balance between melodic accessibility and genre variation. Although the compositional techniques used on the album are described as conventional, employing basic song structures and a production style that is "glossy and clean", the band's emphasis on melody remains a consistent feature. The ability to integrate melodic elements across varying stylistic contexts allows the band to explore heavier musical passages without sounding overtly abrasive. The structure of the album reflects a division in stylistic emphasis. The first half primarily consists of rock-oriented tracks with a heavier sound, while the second half introduces more experimental material.

The guitar work on Purple has been described as central to the album's sound. Mancuso comments that the guitarist Dean DeLeo employs a tonal approach that is among "the fullest and most rewarding" within the alternative rock genre. His playing is characterized by clarity, melodic construction, and the use of alternate tunings. The album's opening track, "Meatplow", features a prominent guitar riff noted for its forceful and melodic qualities, establishing a dynamic interplay with the bass. On "Vasoline", Dean DeLeo uses a three-over-four rhythmic pattern based on two notes, creating an initial impression of minimalism. This is contrasted by what's referred to as "crystal-clear" guitar tones that, alongside Weiland's vocal harmonies, enhance the track's sonic intensity during the chorus. Dean DeLeo's acoustic guitar work also plays a significant role in shaping the album's dynamics. Tracks such as "Pretty Penny" and "Kitchenware & Candybars" incorporate acoustic passages that facilitate key changes and support softer verse sections. The bassist, Robert DeLeo, contributes bass lines that reflect a similarly melodic sensibility. His playing is characterized by tonal contrast and adaptability. Mancuso highlights the difference between the "light, floaty" bass line on "Interstate Love Song" and the more aggressive, distorted approach on "Army Ants" as evidence of his dynamic range.

Weiland's vocal performance on Purple has been charactered as equally important to its musical impact. Mancuso describes his vocals as "soaring" with a delivery that is both emotionally resonant and technically precise. Despite public attention surrounding his personal struggles at the time, particularly with heroin addiction, he emphasizes the clarity and consistency of his voice, noting that it remains "unwavering and extremely clear" throughout the record. Weiland's vocal range is identified as notably expansive, allowing for a dynamic performance style that shifts fluidly between restrained melodies and more forceful expressions. His harmonies with Robert DeLeo contribute to the album's sound, particularly on the first two tracks, though similar moments are noted elsewhere on the album. Mancuso also highlights Weiland's capacity to carry songs through single vocal tracks without relying on overdubbing or harmonization. Songs such as "Meatplow" and "Interstate Love Song" are cited as examples of his ability to "belt out powerful melodic howls", while "Big Empty" showcases what is referred to as his "incredibly technical tenor". Described as "grandiose, uplifting and just all-out bombastic", it highlights both the song's quiet-loud dynamic structure and Weiland's ability to alternate between a light, airy tenor and more intense, melodic bursts. These performances combine clarity with expressive force, resulting in what Mancuso describes as "vocal euphoria" on tracks like "Kitchenware & Candybars".

== Artwork ==
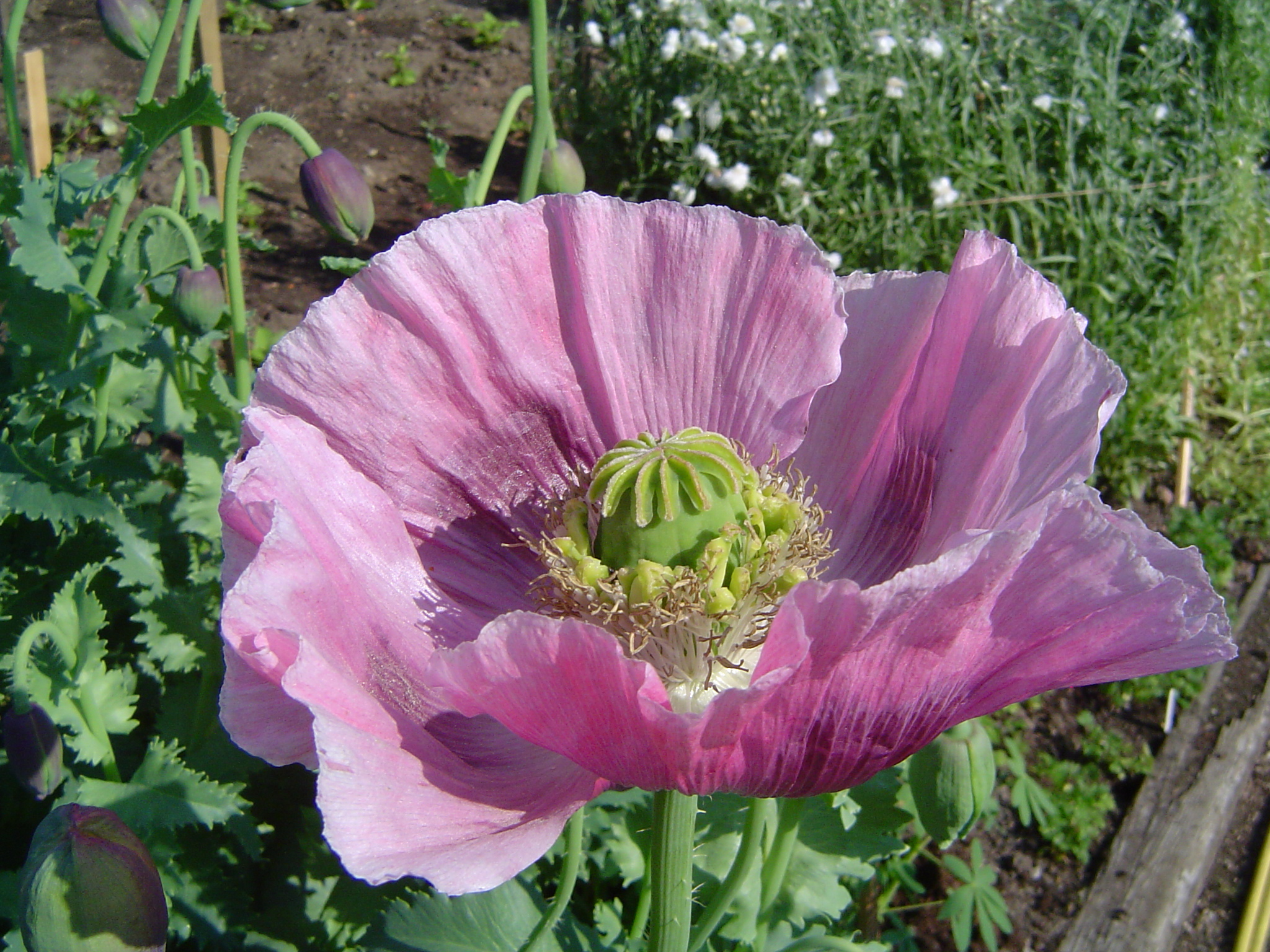
Dale Sizer replicated old Chinese opium labels on Purple's artwork

The cover art for the album features a painting of a child riding on a Qilin accompanied by a quintet of fairies above the creature and the child, taking place on a cloudy background. The album title is written as a Chinese character, zǐ (紫), on the cover, and nowhere else on the packaging (with exception of the UK and European limited edition vinyl release). Early pressings featured the Chinese character and band name printed on the CD jewel case cover itself.

The artwork for Purple was somewhat of a mystery, but Justin Beckner of Ultimate Guitar reached out to its illustrator, Dale Sizer, who explained: "As I remember... I was hired by designer John Heiden, to replicate an old Chinese opium label that one of the band members had. Before I got started, they ran out of time and got a retoucher to clean up the original image and used that. I added background clouds and sky to the image to fill out the package." Beckner also speculates the title of the album is a reference to a certain strain of opium. Opium poppies come in a variety of colors, depending on what area of the world they come from, and the strains used. One of the more common strains is purple.

On analogue formats (LP and cassette) of the original release, the album title is shown as simply Stone Temple Pilots on the tape shells and LP labels. No track listing appears on the back cover, which instead displays the image of a decorated cake with the phrase "12 Gracious Melodies", which is a clue to a hidden track as song twelve. On the cover of the cassette version of Purple, the child is holding the Chinese character in his hand, rather than positioned in the corner. There are two pressings of the actual disc art of Purple. One version has a close-up of the frosted flowers from the cake on the rear panel on it and another has dragon scales. The vinyl LP release is made from colored vinyl – transparent purple in the US and UK release and a limited edition opaque marbled vinyl in a softer shade of purple available only in the UK and Europe.

== Critical reception ==
=== Contemporary ===
Professional ratings
Review scores
Source	Rating
Chicago Tribune	2/4 stars
Entertainment Weekly	B−
Rolling Stone	3/5 stars
Select	2/5 medals
Spin Alternative Record Guide	5/10

Purple received mixed-to-negative reviews on release, with critics perceiving a lack of originality. Greg Kot of the Chicago Tribune called it a "hollow, superficial" follow-up to Core, finding that it recycles the sound of "Plush" and relies on overproduced grunge formulas. In The Village Voice, Robert Christgau dismissed Purple as a "dud". Writing for Entertainment Weekly, David Browne noted multiple musical influences from contemporary bands at the time and remarked that they "pull off these copycat melodies with supreme skill". Rolling Stone's Lorraine Ali also acknowledged the band's derivative tendencies but praised the album's confidence, emotional range, and musical diversity. Despite the continued comparisons to other bands, Ali suggested that "Purple will blow your skirt up – if you let it". Mick Wall for Raw Magazine praised the songs, writing, "That they can come up with something like the jaw-grinding 'Vasoline' and lay it four-square next to the bleary-eyed beauty of, say, 'Kitchen Ware & Candy Bars', or combine elements of both, as on the swanky new single, 'Interstate Love Song', may have worked against them in terms of their noise cred, but it is a gift which has propelled their music beyond the snare of catch-names like Grunge and into the realms of the truly timeless." Raw ranked it number 7 on their list of best albums of 1994.

=== Retrospective ===
Professional ratings
Review scores
Source	Rating
AllMusic	4/5 stars
Christgau's Consumer Guide	(dud)
Collector's Guide to Heavy Metal	9/10
Encyclopedia of Popular Music	4/5 stars
The Rolling Stone Album Guide	3.5/5 stars
Sputnikmusic	4/5

Retrospective reviews have been generally positive. In the New Rolling Stone Album Guide, Steve Appleford stated that Purple's "playing is better, more confident, and looser" than Core. Stephen Thomas Erlewine of AllMusic reviewed the album positively, describing it as a "quantum leap" over Core and a sign of the band coming into its own. He acknowledged that the album still contained filler, but felt it had more character than the debut. Sputnikmusic staff Jack Mancuso offers high praise for Purple, calling it Stone Temple Pilots' best album and a major step forward from Core. While noting that none of the techniques are groundbreaking, he commends the band's melodic instincts, the fullness of Dean DeLeo's guitar work, Robert DeLeo's dynamic basslines, and Weiland's expressive and technically strong vocals.

== Legacy ==
In 2005, Purple was ranked number 438 in Rock Hard magazine's book of The 500 Greatest Rock & Metal Albums of All Time. In 2006, the album was ranked number 73 on Guitar World magazine's list of the 100 greatest guitar albums of all time. In May 2014, Loudwire placed Purple at number six on its "10 Best Hard Rock Albums of 1994" list. In July 2014, Guitar World ranked Purple at number 24 in their "Superunknown: 50 Iconic Albums That Defined 1994" list. In 2019, Rolling Stone ranked the album at No. 24 on its list of the "50 Greatest Grunge Albums." In 2022, Pitchfork named Purple one of the 25 Best Grunge Albums of the '90s.

A 25th anniversary edition of the album was released on October 18, 2019, in several formats including a 1LP/3CD/7 inch super deluxe box set much like the deluxe version of Core released in 2017.

== Track listing ==
All lyrics are written by Scott Weiland.

Purple track listing
No.	Title	Music	Length
1.	"Meatplow"	Robert DeLeo; Dean DeLeo	3:37
2.	"Vasoline"	R. DeLeo; D. DeLeo; Weiland; Eric Kretz	2:56
3.	"Lounge Fly"	R. DeLeo	5:18
4.	"Interstate Love Song"	R. DeLeo	3:14
5.	"Still Remains"	R. DeLeo; D. DeLeo	3:33
6.	"Pretty Penny"	D. DeLeo	3:42
7.	"Silvergun Superman"	R. DeLeo; D. DeLeo	5:16
8.	"Big Empty"	D. DeLeo	4:54
9.	"Unglued"	Weiland; R. DeLeo	2:34
10.	"Army Ants"	D. DeLeo	3:46
11.	"Kitchenware & Candybars" (includes hidden track (Note: "Kitchenware & Candybars" ends at 4:27. A hidden track, "Second Album", starts at 4:54. The lounge song was written by Richard Peterson, a Seattle street musician. It was sung by Eric McKaig, and engineered and produced in Seattle by Peter Barnes in 1985.))	R. DeLeo	8:06
Total length:			46:59

All lyrics are written by Scott Weiland, except where noted; all music is composed by Robert DeLeo, except where noted.

Purple Rarities track listing
No.	Title	Lyrics	Music	Length
1.	"Meatplow" (Early Version)		D. DeLeo, R. DeLeo	3:33
2.	"Interstate Love Song" (Early Version)			3:19
3.	"Big Empty" (Acoustic Version)			5:40
4.	"Army Ants" (Demo)			3:59
5.	"Unglued" (Demo)		Weiland, R. DeLeo	2:37
6.	"Dancing Days" (Demo)	Robert Plant, Jimmy Page	Page, Plant, John Paul Jones, John Bonham	3:56
7.	"She Knows Me Too Well" (Demo)	Brian Wilson, Mike Love	Wilson	3:03
8.	"Interstate Love Song" (Acoustic Version)			3:59

Notes

- A cover of Led Zeppelin's "Dancing Days" on the 2019 remastered re-release first appeared on 1995's Encomium: A Tribute to Led Zeppelin.

== Personnel ==
Stone Temple Pilots

- Scott Weiland – vocals, guitar on "Silvergun Superman", percussion on "Pretty Penny"
- Dean DeLeo – electric, acoustic, and slide guitars, percussion on "Pretty Penny", drum ending on "Silvergun Superman"
- Robert DeLeo – bass, guitar on "Vasoline", "Lounge Fly", "Pretty Penny", "Silvergun Superman", and "Kitchenware & Candybars", percussion on "Pretty Penny"
- Eric Kretz – drums, percussion on "Vasoline", "Lounge Fly", "Pretty Penny", and "Big Empty"

Additional personnel

- Brendan O'Brien – producer, recording, mixing, percussion on "Meatplow", "Interstate Love Song", "Silvergun Superman", "Army Ants" and "Kitchenware & Candybars", guitar on "Kitchenware & Candybars", Mellotron on "Army Ants"
- Nick DiDia – engineer
- Caram Costanzo – assistant engineer
- Bob Ludwig – mastering
- Paul Leary – ending guitar solo on "Lounge Fly"
- John Heiden – design
- Dale Sizer – illustrations

== Charts ==
=== Weekly charts ===
Chart (1994)	Peak position
Australian Albums (ARIA)	1
Austrian Albums (Ö3 Austria)	18
Canadian Albums (RPM)	2
Dutch Albums (Album Top 100)	32
German Albums (Offizielle Top 100)	15
New Zealand Albums (RMNZ)	3
Norwegian Albums (VG-lista)	11
Swedish Albums (Sverigetopplistan)	6
Swiss Albums (Schweizer Hitparade)	25
UK Albums (Official Charts)	10
US Billboard 200	1

Chart (2019)	Peak position
Hungarian Albums (MAHASZ)	20

=== Year-end charts ===
Chart (1994)	Position
Australian Albums (ARIA)	58
German Albums (Offizielle Top 100)	87
US Billboard 200	13
Chart (1995)	Position
New Zealand Albums (RMNZ)	25
US Billboard 200	49

=== Decade-end charts ===
Chart (1990–1999)	Position
US Billboard 200	99

== Certifications ==
Region	Certification	Certified units/sales
Australia (ARIA)	2× Platinum	140,000^{^}
Canada (Music Canada)	3× Platinum	300,000^{^}
New Zealand (RMNZ)	Platinum	15,000^{^}
United Kingdom (BPI)	Silver	60,000^{^}
United States (RIAA)	6× Platinum	6,000,000^{^}
^{^} Shipments figures based on certification alone.

== Notes and references ==
Notes
