= Jeff Gutt =

American singer (born 1976)

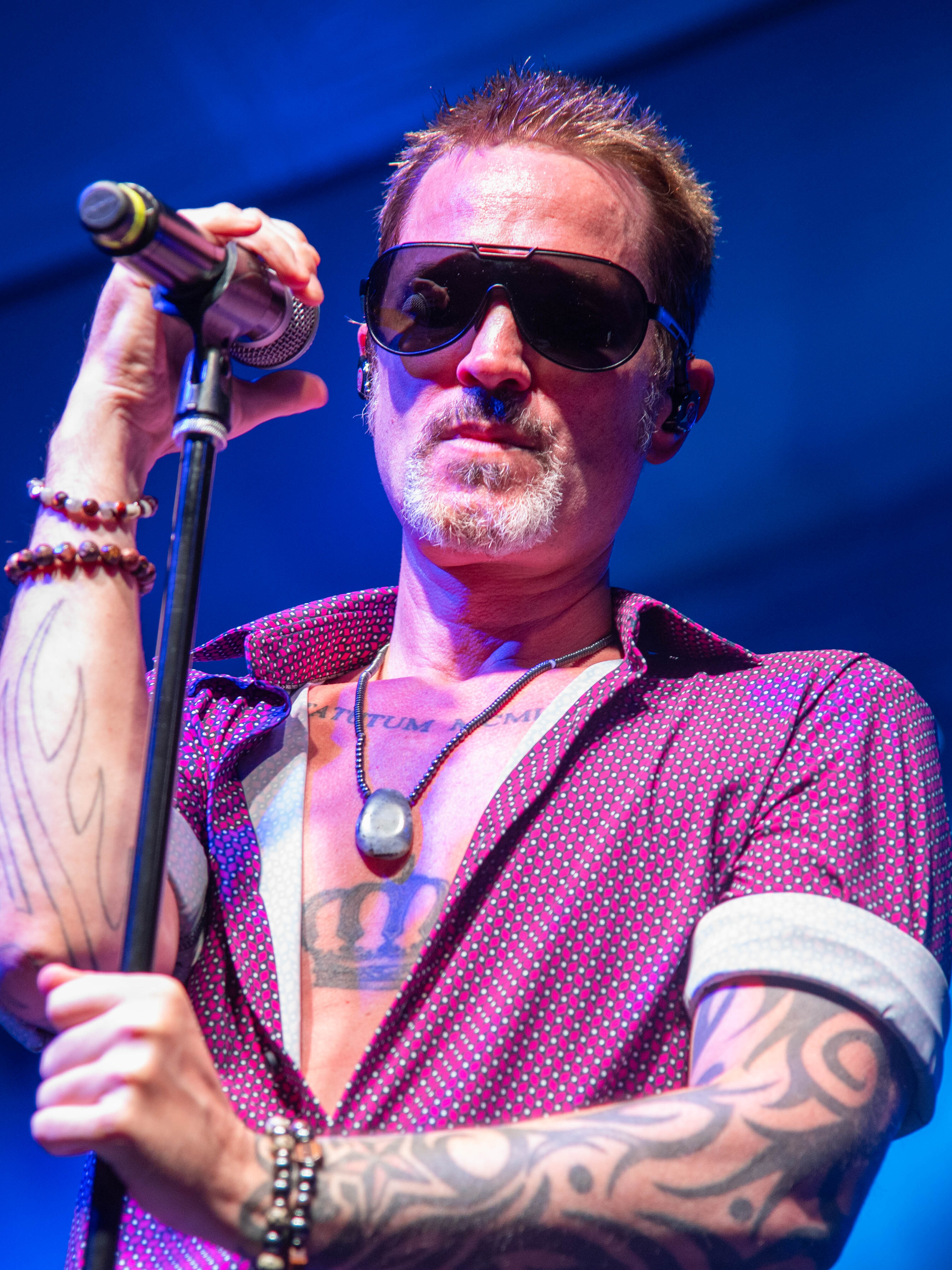
- Gutt performing with Stone Temple Pilots in 2024

Background information
- Born: Jeffrey Adam Gutt; May 2, 1976 (age 50)
- Origin: Marine City, Michigan, U.S.
- Genres: Alternative rock; hard rock; alternative metal; nu metal; post-grunge
- Occupations: Singer; songwriter
- Instruments: Vocals; guitar
- Years active: 1992–present
- Member of: Stone Temple Pilots
- Formerly of: Dry Cell, The Band With No Name, Acrylic, Punch, Innerfaith

Jeffrey Adam Gutt (born May 2, 1976) is an American singer and songwriter who has been the lead vocalist for Stone Temple Pilots since November 2017. He is also the former lead vocalist for the nu metal band Dry Cell.

Gutt has appeared in two seasons of the American reality television series The X Factor. He first appeared in season 2 (2012) when he drew international acclaim for his rendition of Leonard Cohen's "Hallelujah", before being eliminated in the following "Boot Camp" episode. Gutt competed in season 3 (2013) of The X Factor USA, finishing in second place. In 2014, he was dubbed as one of the most "influential" X Factor USA contestants of all time by FoxWeekly.

== Early life and career ==
Gutt's family resided in St. Clair County, located in southeast Michigan, throughout most of his childhood years. He attended schools in both Algonac and Marine City, graduating from Marine City High School in 1994.

Gutt's prominent band during his high school years was Innerfaith. He was the frontman of Innerfaith, which he formed with friends Matt Brooks on bass, Jeff Sankuer on drums, and guitarist Patrick Sankuer. Innerfaith wrote and performed original songs, ultimately winning the "Blue Water Area Battle of the Bands" in Marysville, Michigan.

In 2012, two early extended plays featuring Gutt on vocals were made downloadable for free through his official site: a three-track 1992–1995 compilation (named Nautical Star by fans for its cover) and a four-track Dragonfly (1997). The latter was recorded by Gutt with the band of the same name which featured Steve Mazur of Our Lady Peace on guitar. Lyrics from the Dragonfly song "Sugarpill" were later used for a Dry Cell song "New Revolution".

=== Dry Cell ===
Gutt became the lead vocalist for Dry Cell by joining the rock band Beyond Control which consisted of members Danny Hartwell, Judd Gruenbaum, and Brandon Brown. The band released a studio album titled Disconnected in 2002. Gutt left the band in 2004 and Dave Wasierski replaced him as lead vocalist. Gutt rejoined Dry Cell in 2005.

The band went on a brief hiatus from 2005 to 2007, but in 2008 reunited with same members. In 2009 Gutt left Dry Cell for good.

In early 2010 a compilation The Dry Cell Collection was released. It contains previously released demos from 2003, 2005 and 2008, B-sides from Disconnected and one previously unreleased song, "So Alive". The band have had no news on their MySpace page since 2010. In 2012, it was said on Gutt's official website that Dry Cell is now defunct.

=== In Acrylic, Band with No Name, and Punch ===
After parting ways with Dry Cell in 2004, Gutt recorded eight demo songs with a band named Acrylic.

In 2005 (when Dry Cell went on hiatus), Gutt and his friend, guitarist Gary Pittel, formed Band with No Name (abbreviated as BWNN). The band also included Aaron Hutchinson (drums), Justin "Antic" Hackman (keyboards), Mike Guy and later Ben Lula (bass). In 2007, BWNN released a five-track self-titled EP. In 2008, they won 89X & TNTs Battle of the Bands in Michigan and received $10,000 and studio time to record a new EP. Seven new songs were recorded, and a full-length album named Humanity was released in 2009. In 2013, it was re-released under Gutt's name on iTunes and included the song "Stay", which was previously known as the album's B-side.

Gutt, Pittel, and Hutchinson also perform live as a cover band, Punch.

Gutt also appears on Solystic's songs "Carry On", "Open Letter" and "Almost Dead".

=== Rival City ===
In January 2014, Gutt revealed members of his new alternative rock band Rival City Heights: BWNN/Punch bandmate Gary Pittel (guitar), ex-Dry Cell bandmate Brandon Brown (drums), Cyamak Ashtiani (guitar) and KC Jenkins (bass).

On May 3, 2014, Rival City Heights played the debut show at the Masonic Temple in Detroit.

In December 2014, Gutt released "A Detroit Christmas" as a solo artist.

In late 2015, Rival City Heights toured the Middle East (Jordan, Turkey, Egypt, Lebanon) and India for a series of concerts in association with the Princess Alia Foundation.

On February 19, 2016, Rival City Heights released the debut single "Take It Back" and from February to March 2016, played a tour with Trapt to promote it. Before the tour Brandon Brown left the band and was replaced with Evanescence's Will Hunt on drums. On November 29, 2016, it was announced that Gary Pittel and Cyamak Ashtiani had left the band, Gene Lenardo (ex-Filter, Device) was to take guitar duties, and that Rival City Heights had been renamed to Rival City.

On October 31, 2016, Rival City released "Fading Out / What's Going On", a double single produced by Kevin Churko.

== The X Factor ==
=== Season 2 ===
In 2012, Gutt auditioned for the second season of the American singing competition series The X Factor. In an episode broadcast on September 20, 2012, Gutt sang "Hallelujah", a cover of Leonard Cohen, getting unanimous four "yes"es from the judges Simon Cowell, Britney Spears, Demi Lovato and L.A. Reid. However, he could not make it past the "boot camp" stage and was eliminated before the live shows. Several weeks later, Cowell stated to Access Hollywood that one regret he had was sending Gutt home early.

On March 29, 2013, Gutt released a music video for his debut solo single "Hallelujah" through vimeo. Gutt's bandmates from BWNN are also shown in the video. On April 28, 2013, the single was released on iTunes.

Gutt's performances included:

Show	Theme	Song	Original artist	Order	Result
Audition	Free choice	"Hallelujah"	Leonard Cohen	—N/a	Through to bootcamp
Bootcamp 1	Solo performance	Not aired		—N/a	Through to bootcamp 2
Bootcamp 2	Group performance	Not aired		—N/a	Through to bootcamp 3
Bootcamp 3	Duet performance	"If I Die Young"	The Band Perry	—N/a	Eliminated

=== Season 3 ===
In 2013, he returned once again with the third season of the competition. He auditioned with the song "I Don't Want to Miss a Thing" from Aerosmith. After the judges objected, he was offered a second song, "Creep" from Radiohead. Based on that performance, he was put in the Final 40, and one of ten finalists in the "Over 25" category mentored by Kelly Rowland.

In the newly introduced "four-chair challenge", Gutt sang "Amazing Grace" and was selected as a Final 16 candidate and one of four in the "Over 25" category.

Ultimately, Gutt was the runner-up for The X Factor season 3, finishing second place to Alex & Sierra in a razor-thin margin of votes from American viewers.

Gutt's performances include:

Day of broadcast	Show	Theme	Song	Original artist	Result
September 18	Audition	Free choice	"I Don't Want to Miss a Thing" "Creep"	Aerosmith; Radiohead	Through to Four-Chair challenge
October 2	Four-Chair Challenge	Solo performance	"Amazing Grace"	John Newton	Advanced
October 29	Live show 1 (Top 16)	Mentor's choice	"Try"	Pink	Saved by Kelly Rowland
November 6	Live show 2 (Top 13)	Motown Night	"Say You, Say Me"	Lionel Richie	N/A
November 7	Live show 3 (Top 13 Get Another Chance)	Free choice	"In the Air Tonight"	Phil Collins	Safe
November 13	Live show 4 (Top 12)	80's Night	"(I Just) Died in Your Arms"	Cutting Crew	Safe
November 20	Live show 5 (Top 10)	British Invasion	"Bohemian Rhapsody"	Queen	Safe
November 27	Live show 6 (Top 8)	Big Band Night	"Feeling Good"	Anthony Newley and Leslie Bricusse	Safe
December 4	Live show 7 (Top 6)	Diva Night; Unplugged	"Without You" "Daniel"	Badfinger; Elton John	Safe
December 11	Live show 8 (Top 4)	Viewers' choice	"Hallelujah"	Leonard Cohen	Safe
December 11	Live show 8 (Top 4)	Duet (with Restless Road)	"Every Breath You Take"	The Police	Safe
December 11	Live show 8 (Top 4)	No Theme	"Demons"	Imagine Dragons	Safe
December 12	Live show 8 (Top 4)	Victory song	"Open Arms"	Journey	Safe
December 18	Live show 9 (Finale)	Winner's song	"Dream On"	Aerosmith	Runner-up
December 18	Live show 9 (Finale)	Celebrity duet	"Iris" (with John Rzeznik)	Goo Goo Dolls	Runner-up
December 18	Live show 9 (Finale)	Favorite performance	"Creep"	Radiohead	Runner-up
December 19	Live show 9 (Finale)	Christmas songs	"O Holy Night"	Adolphe Adam	Runner-up

- Gutt also performed Queen's "We Will Rock You" with Alex & Sierra and Carlito Olivero and John Newman's "Love Me Again" with Alex & Sierra in Finale.

== Stone Temple Pilots ==
On November 16, 2016, Entertainment Tonight reported that Stone Temple Pilots had recruited Gutt to be their new lead singer, replacing Chester Bennington, who had left the band one year earlier. The following day, however, a representative for the band denied this rumor, saying that "the band has been rehearsing with several singers over the past few weeks" and "they haven't made a decision yet." A year later, on November 14, 2017, Stone Temple Pilots officially announced Gutt as their new lead singer and played their first concert with him that same night at the Troubadour in Los Angeles. Gutt's first single with the band is "Meadow". Founding member Dean DeLeo said: "We wanted someone who would not only do our earlier songs justice, but would also write new songs and carve out a different path forward with us. It took some time, but we found our guy."

Stone Temple Pilots have since released two albums with Gutt on vocals: their second self-titled album in 2018 and eighth studio album, Perdida, in 2020.

== Discography ==
=== With Stone Temple Pilots ===
- 2018 – Stone Temple Pilots
- 2020 – Perdida

=== With Rival City ===
- 2016 – Take It Back (Single) (under the name Rival City Heights)
- 2016 – Fading Out / What's Going On (Single)
- 2016 - Everlost and Nowhere Found
- 2016 - Nothing Left Anymore

=== With Band with No Name (BWNN) ===
- 2007 – BWNN EP
- 2009 – Humanity (re-released in 2013 as Gutt's solo album on most music streaming platforms)

=== Solo ===
- 1992–1995 – "Nautical Star"
- 2013 – Hallelujah (Single)
- 2013 – The X Factor USA Season 3 Live Performances
- 2014 – A Detroit Christmas (Single)

=== With Dry Cell ===
- 2001 – Demo EP (as Impür)
- 2002 – Disconnected
- 2010 – The Dry Cell Collection

=== With Dragonfly ===
- 1997 – Dragonfly

=== With Acrylic ===
- 2004 - Demos

=== Other ===
==== Solystic ====
- Almost Dead
- Carry On
- Open Letter
