= Pretty Penny =

- US promotional single release

Promotional single by Stone Temple Pilots

from the album Purple
- Released: March 5, 1995
- Recorded: 1994
- Genre: Acoustic rock
- Length: 3:42
- Label: Atlantic
- Composer: Dean DeLeo
- Lyricist: Scott Weiland
- Producer: Brendan O'Brien

Stone Temple Pilots promotional single chronology
"Unglued" (1994)	"Pretty Penny" (1995)	"Dancing Days" (1995)

Audio sample
- file; help

"Pretty Penny" is a song by the American rock band Stone Temple Pilots from their second studio album, Purple (1994). It differs greatly in style from the rest of the songs on the album, and serves as a calm, acoustic interlude between the distorted and delirious "Still Remains" and the aggressive, sinister "Silvergun Superman".

According to lead vocalist Scott Weiland, this song was his last desperate attempt to prove to himself that he was not a drug addict. His drug addiction later became a huge problem for the band and led to two hiatuses and, ultimately, his death.

Weiland stated the following in a RIP magazine interview in 1994:

We were in our rehearsal room and Robert and Dean were playing acoustic guitar with each other, playing this line, and Eric grabbed a couple microphones and started tapping in some kind of rhythmic pattern. It was coming through the monitor, and there was a single Indian drum made out of stretched leather, and we just started a little interplay between us. We recorded onto cassette tape, I took it home, and the melody came into my head for the verse, and it became a song. It's a special song, personally, one of those songs you write because of some form of defense mechanism that's subconscious. I wrote it third person and I only realized a couple weeks ago when I finally listened to the whole album that it was actually an introspective thing. It's easier to write in an allegorical sense third-person when it's something you have a hard time looking at. It's probably one of my favorite songs on the album. I think people are going to either love it or hate it.

In 2013 without Weiland, the song was performed again by the three remaining members of the band with their new lead vocalist Chester Bennington of Linkin Park and Dead by Sunrise. The song can be heard on KROQ, and a video of their performance at a different location to where it's played can be seen on YouTube, which was uploaded by its user.

== Charts ==
Chart (1995)	Peak position
US Mainstream Rock (Billboard)	12
