= Interstate Love Song =

1994 single by Stone Temple Pilots

Single by Stone Temple Pilots

from the album Purple
- B-side: "Lounge Fly"
- Released: August 1994
- Genre: Grunge; alternative rock; hard rock; country rock
- Length: 3:14
- Label: Atlantic
- Composer: Robert DeLeo
- Lyricist: Scott Weiland
- Producer: Brendan O'Brien

Stone Temple Pilots singles chronology
"Vasoline" (1994)	"Interstate Love Song" (1994)	"Big Empty" (1995)

Audio sample
- "Interstate Love Song": file; help

Music video
- "Interstate Love Song" on YouTube

"Interstate Love Song" is a song by the American rock band Stone Temple Pilots from their second studio album, Purple (1994). The song was released as the second single from the album in August 1994. One of the band's biggest hits, "Interstate Love Song" reached number one on the US Billboard Album Rock Tracks chart on September 17, 1994, replacing the band's previous single "Vasoline". The song stayed at number one for 15 weeks, a record at the time, and gave Stone Temple Pilots 17 consecutive weeks at number one. It also peaked at number two on the Billboard Modern Rock Tracks chart and in Iceland as well as number 20 in Canada.

"Interstate Love Song" has been hailed as one of the best songs of the 1990s and was included on STP's greatest hits compilation Thank You in 2003. In 2009, it was named the 58th best hard rock song of all time by VH1. The song was ranked at number 17 on Australian alternative music station Triple J's Hottest 100 countdown of 1994, and Pitchfork ranked it at number 175 on its list of "The Top 200 Tracks of the 1990s."

== Background, recording and release ==
Bassist Robert DeLeo brought in a song he had been working on when Stone Temple Pilots convened at Cole Rehearsal Studios in Hollywood, California, in March 1992. His brother, guitarist Dean DeLeo, said, "We were in Atlanta touring Core, and Robert was playing around with the chords and the melody in a hotel room. I had a feeling about that song immediately." Robert DeLeo stated it was originally a bossa nova song when he began writing it. When he played it for singer Scott Weiland, the vocalist started humming along and turned what was originally the melody for the song's intro into a chorus melody. Stone Temple Pilots recorded the song during sessions for Purple at the Southern Tracks studio in Atlanta, Georgia. Weiland was able to complete his vocals for the song in one take.

Upon its release as a single, "Interstate Love Song" reached number 18 on the Billboard Hot 100 Airplay and number one on the Mainstream Rock Tracks chart, where it stayed for fifteen weeks. The song also reached number two on the Modern Rock Tracks chart and number 22 on the Top 40 Mainstream. In 2015, Loudwire and Stereogum ranked the song number one and number two, respectively, on their lists of the 10 greatest Stone Temple Pilots songs.

== Composition ==
"Interstate Love Song" has been described as grunge, alternative rock, hard rock and country rock. In an interview in 2019, bassist Robert DeLeo said that the composition was initially a bossa nova style song that he played on a cheap nylon string guitar during touring.

According to Weiland, the lyrics are about the troubles he was having with his girlfriend, Janina, at the time, saying, "The words are about the lies I was trying to conceal while making the Purple record". "She'd ask how I was doing, and I'd lie, say I was doing fine," he wrote in his autobiography Not Dead and Not For Sale. "I imagined what was going through her mind when I wrote, 'Waiting on a Sunday afternoon for what I read between the lines, your lies, feelin' like a hand in rusted shame, so do you laugh or does it cry? Reply?'"

== Music video ==
The music video, directed by Kevin Kerslake, has a washed-out color effect throughout the majority of the video and features a long-nosed protagonist escaping from an unseen pursuer. The protagonist's nose grows longer throughout the video (similar to Pinocchio), to symbolize the theme of lying in the song lyrics. At the beginning of the video, an early 1900s silent film-esque clip of the protagonist is shown.

== Track listings ==
UK and European CD single

1. "Interstate Love Song"
2. "Lounge Fly"
3. "Vasoline" (live)
4. "Interstate Love Song" (live)

UK 7-inch and cassette single

1. "Interstate Love Song"
2. "Lounge Fly"

German and Australian CD single

1. "Interstate Love Song" – 3:13
2. "Silvergun Superman" – 5:16
3. "Army Ants" – 3:46

== Charts ==
=== Weekly charts ===
1994–1995 weekly chart performance for "Interstate Love Song"
Chart (1994–1995)	Peak position
Australia (ARIA)	50
Canada Top Singles (RPM)	20
Iceland (Íslenski Listinn Topp 40)	2
New Zealand (Recorded Music NZ)	47
Scottish Singles Sales (Official Charts)	52
UK Singles (Official Charts)	53
UK Rock & Metal (Official Charts)	9
US Alternative Airplay (Billboard)	2
US Mainstream Rock (Billboard)	1
US Pop Airplay (Billboard)	22
US Radio Songs (Billboard)	18

2015 weekly chart performance for "Interstate Love Song"
Chart (2015)	Peak position
US Hot Rock & Alternative Songs (Billboard)	9

=== Year-end charts ===
1994 year-end chart performance for "Interstate Love Song"
Chart (1994)	Position
Iceland (Íslenski Listinn Topp 40)	69
US Album Rock Tracks (Billboard)	12
US Modern Rock Tracks (Billboard)	9

1995 year-end chart performance for "Interstate Love Song"
Chart (1995)	Position
US Album Rock Tracks (Billboard)	19
US Hot 100 Airplay (Billboard)	73

== Certifications ==
Certifications for "Interstate Love Song"
Region	Certification	Certified units/sales
New Zealand (RMNZ)	2× Platinum	60,000^{‡}
United Kingdom (BPI)	Silver	200,000^{‡}
^{‡} Sales+streaming figures based on certification alone.

== Release history ==
Release dates and formats for "Interstate Love Song"
Region	Date	Format(s)	Label(s)	Ref.
United States	August 1994	Radio	Atlantic	
Australia	October 3, 1994	CD	Atlantic	
United Kingdom	December 5, 1994	7-inch vinyl; CD; cassette	Atlantic	
