= Vasoline =

1994 single by Stone Temple Pilots

Single by Stone Temple Pilots

from the album Purple
- B-side: "Meatplow"; "Andy Warhol" (live); "Crackerman" (live)
- Released: May 25, 1994
- Genre: Grunge; alternative rock; hard rock; psychedelic rock
- Length: 2:56
- Label: Atlantic
- Composers: Robert DeLeo; Dean DeLeo; Eric Kretz
- Lyricist: Scott Weiland
- Producer: Brendan O'Brien

Stone Temple Pilots singles chronology
"Creep" (1993)	"Vasoline" (1994)	"Interstate Love Song" (1994)

Audio sample
- "Vasoline": file; help

Music video
- "Vasoline" on YouTube

"Vasoline" is a song by American rock band Stone Temple Pilots from their second album, Purple (1994). The song was serviced to US radio on May 25, 1994, through Atlantic Records. It reached number one on the US Billboard Album Rock Tracks chart for two weeks. The song's odd-sounding intro was created by Robert DeLeo, who ran his bass through a wah-wah pedal to get the said effect. The song's lyrics were written by vocalist Scott Weiland. "Vasoline" also appears on the greatest hits compilation album Thank You. A live version also appears on The Family Values 2001 Tour compilation.

== Composition and meaning ==
During STP's performance of "Vasoline" on VH1 Storytellers, Weiland says that the song is about "feeling like an insect under a magnifying glass." During an interview with Greg Prato from SongFacts.com on October 14, 2014, Scott Weiland confirmed that the key line in this song came from a misheard lyric: His parents put on the Eagles song "Life in the Fast Lane", and Weiland thought they were singing, "Flies in the Vaseline."

In his autobiography Not Dead and Not for Sale, he adds that it "is about being stuck in the same situation over and over again. It's about me becoming a junkie. It's about lying to [my first wife] Jannina [sic] (Castaneda) and lying to the band about my heroin addiction."

== Music videos ==
The music videos (directed by Kevin Kerslake) were in heavy rotation on MTV. There are at least three different versions of the video, labeled "X Version", "Y Version", and "Z Version". All versions are similar, using parts of the same footage with some minor differences and shown in different orders. The single album art is taken directly from the music video.

=== Differentiation ===
- X Version – begins with a shot of flypaper and then a laughing clown [Robert DeLeo]
- Y Version – begins with a butterfly-catching girl [Deanna Stevens] skipping up to the camera
- Z Version – begins with a man using a sharpening stone wheel

== Track listings ==
UK, European, and Australian CD single

1. "Vasoline" – 2:56
2. "Meatplow" – 3:38
3. "Andy Warhol" (David Bowie cover live from MTV Unplugged) – 3:05
4. "Crackerman" (live from MTV Unplugged) – 4:03

German CD single

1. "Vasoline" – 2:56
2. "Meatplow" – 3:38

== Charts ==
=== Weekly charts ===
Weekly chart performance for "Vasoline"
Chart (1994)	Peak position
Australia (ARIA)	24
Canada Top Singles (RPM)	21
New Zealand (Recorded Music NZ)	28
Scottish Singles Sales (Official Charts)	42
UK Singles (Official Charts)	48
UK Rock & Metal (Official Charts)	23
US Radio Songs (Billboard)	38
US Alternative Airplay (Billboard)	2
US Mainstream Rock (Billboard)	1

=== Year-end charts ===
Year-end chart performance for "Vasoline"
Chart (1994)	Position
US Album Rock Tracks (Billboard)	6
US Modern Rock Tracks (Billboard)	7

== Release history ==
Release dates and formats for "Vasoline"
Region	Date	Format(s)	Label(s)	Ref.
United States	May 25, 1994	Radio	Atlantic	
Australia	July 25, 1994	CD; cassette	Atlantic	
