= Stone Temple Pilots =

American rock band

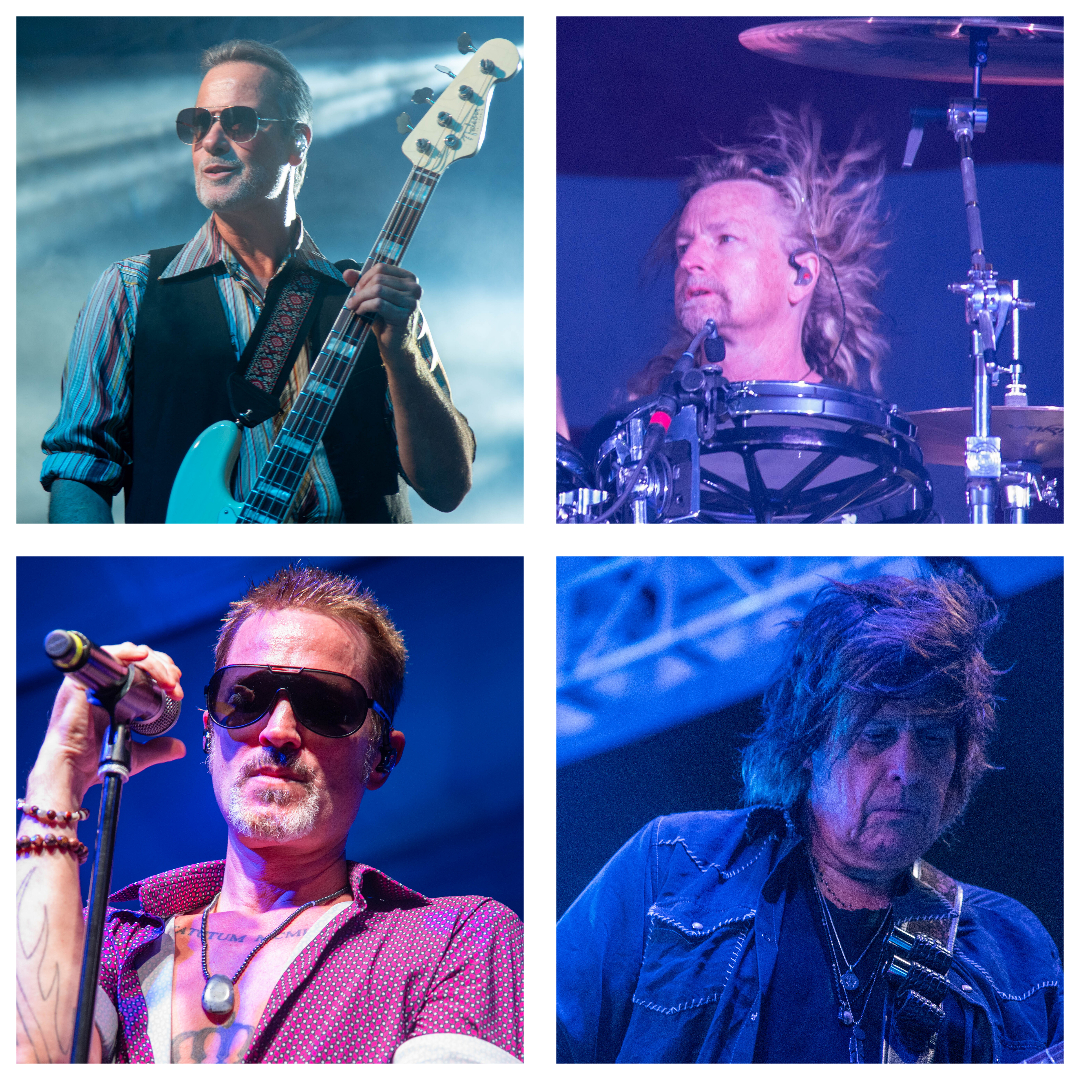
- Stone Temple Pilots performing at the Schofield Barracks in 2024. Clockwise from top left: Robert DeLeo, Eric Kretz, Dean DeLeo and Jeff Gutt.

Background information
- Also known as: Mighty Joe Young (1989–1992); Shirley Temple's Pussy (1992); STP
- Origin: San Diego, California, U.S.
- Genres: Alternative rock; grunge; hard rock; alternative metal; psychedelic rock
- Works: Discography
- Years active: 1989–2003; 2008–present
- Labels: Atlantic; Play Pen; Rhino
- Spinoffs: Talk Show; Army of Anyone
- Spinoff of: Swing
- Members: Robert DeLeo; Eric Kretz; Dean DeLeo; Jeff Gutt
- Past members: Scott Weiland; Chester Bennington
- Website: stonetemplepilots.com

Stone Temple Pilots, commonly abbreviated as STP, are an American rock band formed in San Diego, California, in 1989. Originally consisting of lead vocalist Scott Weiland, drummer Eric Kretz, and brothers Dean (guitar) and Robert DeLeo (bass), the band's lineup remained unchanged from its formation until the firing of Weiland in February 2013. Linkin Park vocalist Chester Bennington joined the band in May 2013 but left amicably in November 2015. Weiland died that December, while Bennington died two years later. In 2016, the band launched an online audition for a new lead vocalist; Jeff Gutt was ultimately announced as their new lead singer on November 14, 2017.

After forming under the name Swing (later Mighty Joe Young), the band signed with Atlantic Records and changed its name to Stone Temple Pilots. Their debut album, Core, released in 1992, was a major commercial hit and proved instrumental in the popularization of grunge in the early 1990s. STP released four more studio albums – Purple (1994), Tiny Music... Songs from the Vatican Gift Shop (1996), No. 4 (1999), and Shangri-La Dee Da (2001) – before separating acrimoniously in 2003. The band members then partook in various projects, most notably Velvet Revolver and Army of Anyone, before reconvening in 2008 for a reunion tour. They then released their self-titled sixth album in 2010. In 2013, the band released the EP High Rise, which was their only release ever recorded with Bennington as lead vocalist. STP has since released two albums with Gutt on vocals: a second self-titled album in 2018, and Perdida in 2020.

While initially rising to fame as part of the grunge movement of the early 1990s, further releases from the band have explored a variety of styles, including psychedelic rock, bossa nova, and country. Stone Temple Pilots are regarded as one of the most successful rock bands of the 1990s, having sold more than 18 million albums in the United States and 40 million worldwide that decade.

== History ==
=== 1985–1992: Formation and early years as Mighty Joe Young ===
In 1985, Scott Weiland and his friends in their band Soi-Disant — guitarist Corey Hickok and drummer David Allin — first encountered Robert DeLeo playing live at various gigs, deciding to track him down after witnessing his shows. Weiland, DeLeo, Hickok and Allin would eventually form a band called Swing. Allin left after a few years. The remaining members saw drummer Eric Kretz play in a Long Beach club and convinced him to join them. Guitarist Hickok eventually left the band in 1989; in need of a replacement and auditioning many guitarists, Robert suggested his older brother, Dean. At the time, Dean was a successful businessman who had left behind his previous musical career but still played guitar as a hobby. The band managed to convince Dean to play for Swing, completing the original lineup. Shortly afterwards, the band changed its name to Mighty Joe Young. They recorded a demo tape around 1990. The Mighty Joe Young demo features tracks that would go on to be re-recorded for the band's first studio album, as well as some musical styles that would not be featured on any of the band's studio albums, such as funk and yodeling.

Mighty Joe Young played several gigs in the San Diego area, building up a fanbase. Their first show was supporting Henry Rollins at the Whisky a Go Go in West Hollywood. The group then began to work on their debut album with Brendan O'Brien. During the recording, they received a call from their lawyer who informed them that there was a bluesman who had already claimed the name Mighty Joe Young. Inspired by the STP Motor Oil stickers that the band members were fans of in their youth, various ideas on the initials "STP" were shared by the band before they settled on the name "Stone Temple Pilots".

=== 1992–1995: Core and Purple ===
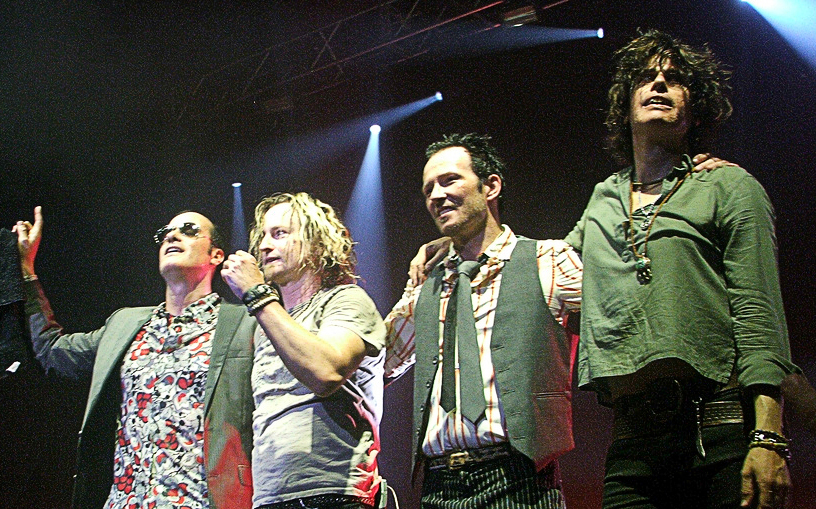
Stone Temple Pilots on stage in 2010

Stone Temple Pilots developed a fan base in San Diego clubs and in 1992 signed with Atlantic Records. Their first album, Core, was released on September 29, 1992, and peaked at No. 3 on the Billboard Albums Chart. Core was a big success, producing hits "Sex Type Thing", "Plush", "Creep", and "Wicked Garden". While the album was a major commercial success, some in the music press criticized the band as "grunge imitators". The same year, Scott Weiland and Dean DeLeo played an acoustic version of "Plush" on the MTV show Headbangers Ball. This is considered one of Weiland's greatest vocal performances. Despite negative reviews from some critics, Stone Temple Pilots continued to gain fans and toured, opening for bands such as Rage Against the Machine and Megadeth. 1993 brought continued success on the road, with the band headlining a two-and-a-half-month American tour.

In 1993, the band filmed an episode of MTV Unplugged, where they debuted the song "Big Empty". In a January 1994 Rolling Stone poll, the band was simultaneously voted Best New Band by Rolling Stone's readers and Worst New Band by the magazine's music critics. The following month the group won Favorite Pop/Rock New Artist and Heavy Metal/Hard Rock New Artist at the American Music Awards. In March 1994, the group won a Grammy Award for Best Hard Rock Performance for the song "Plush". In the spring of 1994, Stone Temple Pilots returned to the studio to work on their second album, Purple. Completed in less than a month, Purple debuted at number one in the United States upon its release on June 7, 1994. The radio-friendly "Interstate Love Song" quickly became a big hit, spending a record-setting fifteen weeks atop the album rock tracks chart. Other hits from the album included "Vasoline" and "Big Empty" (the latter also being featured on the soundtrack to the film The Crow). By October, just four months after its release, Purple had sold three million copies.

=== 1995–2003: Tiny Music, No. 4, and Shangri-La Dee Da ===
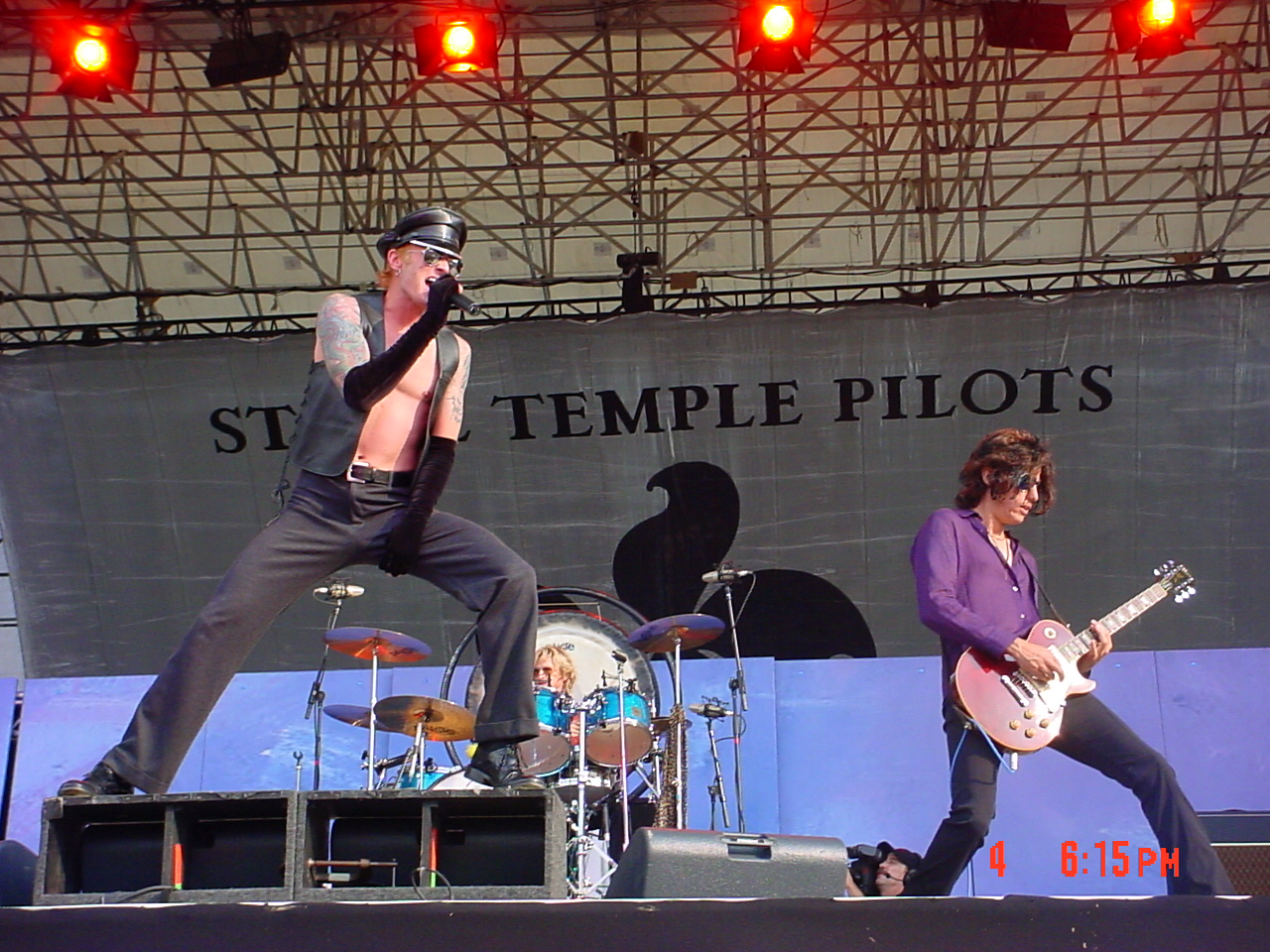
Stone Temple Pilots performing at the Rolling Rock Town Fair in August 2001.

In October 1995, the band regrouped to begin recording its third album, renting out a mansion in Santa Barbara, California, for the band to live together during the recording process. Stone Temple Pilots released the album Tiny Music... Songs from the Vatican Gift Shop on March 5, 1996. The album's sound marked a drastic change from their previous outings, oriented more in the direction of glam rock and psychedelic music than that of the hard rock/grunge sound that propelled them to popularity; critical reception, at the time, was mixed. Rolling Stone, a magazine known for its initial dismissal of the band's music, held a favorable opinion of the album, regarding the release as the group's best effort to date. They expressed surprise, however, at "the clattering, upbeat character of the music" given Weiland's much-publicized run-ins with drugs and the law. Stone Temple Pilots were also featured on the cover of issue No. 753 in February 1997.

The band was only partially successful in being able to tour in support of Tiny Music... and pulled out of a support slot on Kiss' reunion tour. A short tour in the fall of 1996 ensued in the U.S. but final dates at the end of December in Hawaii and some dates in 1997 had to be cancelled in order for Weiland to go to rehab. The band then decided to take a break to work on other projects. Kiss drummer Peter Criss remarked, "I can't call the kettle black. I just pray for the guy and hope that he gets himself better because they really are a great band." With Weiland absent, the band recruited Dave Coutts, frontman of Ten Inch Men, and performed under the moniker Talk Show. Talk Show released one eponymous album in 1997 before dissolving. Meanwhile, pursuing his own musical interests, Weiland released his first solo album, 12 Bar Blues, in 1998. Although both albums received moderate critical praise, neither was commercially successful.

In late 1998, the band regrouped and began work on a fourth Stone Temple Pilots album. Released in 1999, No. 4 was conceived as a "back-to-basics" rock album in the vein of Core or Purple. Stephen Thomas Erlewine of AllMusic compared the album's sound to contemporary alternative metal bands and wrote in his review "it's as if STP decided to compete directly with the new generation of alt-metal bands who prize aggression over hooks or riffs." STP scored one of its biggest hits since the success of Core and Purple with the single "Sour Girl", fueled by a popular music video starring Sarah Michelle Gellar of Buffy the Vampire Slayer fame. The band also recorded an episode of VH1 Storytellers, and went on a summer tour with the Red Hot Chili Peppers. No. 4 would eventually be certified platinum by the RIAA.

During the summer of 2001, the band released its fifth album, Shangri-La Dee Da, which produced one modest rock radio hit in "Days of the Week". Despite promotion of the album by going on tour with Linkin Park on the Family Values Tour, Shangri-La Dee Da was a commercial disappointment. The band recorded "All in the Suit That You Wear", a song intended to be the lead single on the soundtrack for the 2002 film Spider-Man. However, Chad Kroeger's song "Hero" was ultimately chosen as the lead single.

=== 2003–2008: Separation and members' other projects ===
Despite reports that the band had begun work on a sixth studio album in 2002, the band went quiet by the end of that year after reports of an altercation between Dean DeLeo and Weiland after the last show of Stone Temple Pilots' fall 2002 tour. As a capstone to the band's career, Atlantic Records released a greatest hits album, Thank You, with a bonus DVD of archive material and music videos, in 2003. Five days after Thank You was released, the DeLeo brothers revealed in an interview with Guitar One that the band was officially done. Following the band's dissolution, Weiland was recruited to join Velvet Revolver—a successful supergroup—where they released two albums, Contraband in 2004 and Libertad in 2007 before breaking up in 2008. Likewise, the DeLeo brothers formed the supergroup Army of Anyone with vocalist Richard Patrick of the industrial rock band Filter and session drummer Ray Luzier. The band released its self-titled album in 2006 before going on "indefinite hiatus" in 2007. Eric Kretz kept a lower profile during this time, operating his own studio, Bomb Shelter Studios, and drumming for the band Spiralarms.

=== 2008–2011: Reunion and self-titled album ===
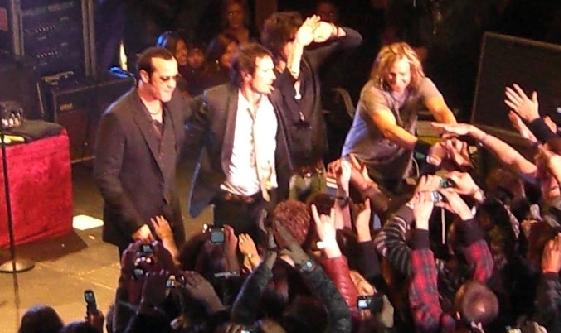
The band greets fans after its first show since 2002 at the Houdini Mansion on April 7, 2008.

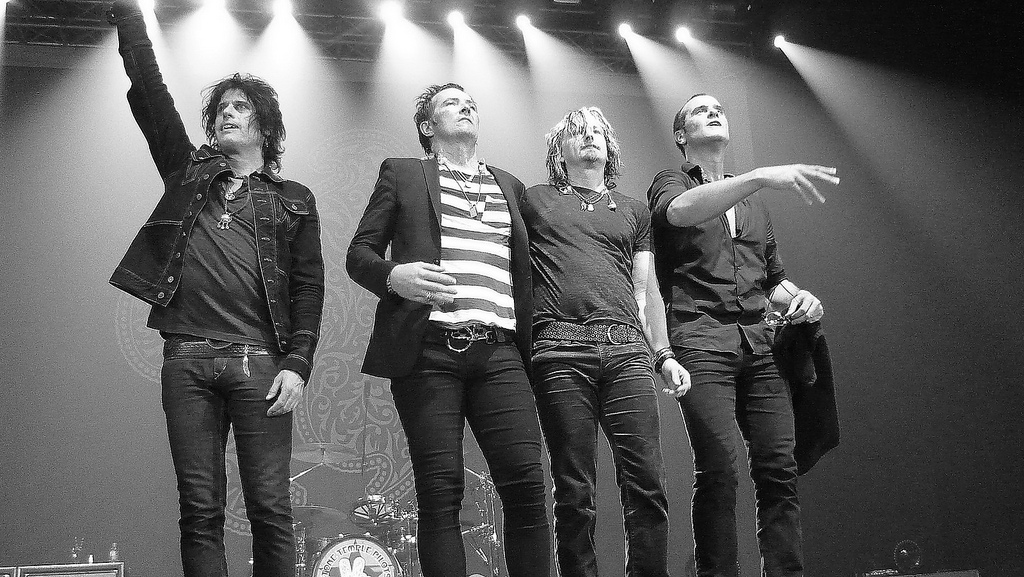
Stone Temple Pilots in Manila, Philippines, in March 2011

According to Dean DeLeo, steps toward a Stone Temple Pilots reformation started with a phone call from Weiland's wife, Mary Forsberg. She invited the DeLeo brothers to play at a private beach party, which led to the reconciliation of Weiland and the DeLeo brothers. In 2007, Dean DeLeo and Weiland discussed a concert promoter's offer to headline several summer festivals. Weiland subsequently left Velvet Revolver in April 2008 and the following month, Stone Temple Pilots announced they were reuniting for a 65-date North American tour. The group officially reunited for a private gig at the Houdini Mansion and held their first public show on Jimmy Kimmel Live! on May 1. Stone Temple Pilots toured throughout the summer and fall, headlining the Virgin Mobile Festival in Baltimore in August of that year as well as the 10th annual Voodoo Experience in New Orleans. The band's six-month reunion tour wrapped up on Halloween 2008 in Pelham, Alabama.

After taking a short break to allow Weiland to support his second solo album, "Happy" in Galoshes, the band began producing their sixth studio album in mid-2009. The band also went on the road for a 13-date North American summer tour in 2009, taking place in-between the tours for Weiland's second solo album. The band showcased new material at South by Southwest in 2010, and also appeared at England's Download Festival 2010 in June, as well as at the Hurricane Festival and Southside Festival in Germany. The band appeared on the Late Show with David Letterman for the first time in ten years on May 19, performing the song "Between the Lines". The band's self-titled sixth album was released on May 25, 2010, debuting at number two on the Billboard 200.

Towards the end of 2010, STP announced they were rescheduling several U.S. tour dates so that the band could take a "short break". They toured Southeast Asia for the first time in 2011, playing in the Philippines (Manila), Singapore, and Indonesia (Jakarta). Following this, the band played successful shows in Australia, including sold-out performances in Sydney and Melbourne.

=== 2012–2013: Split with Weiland and legal proceedings ===
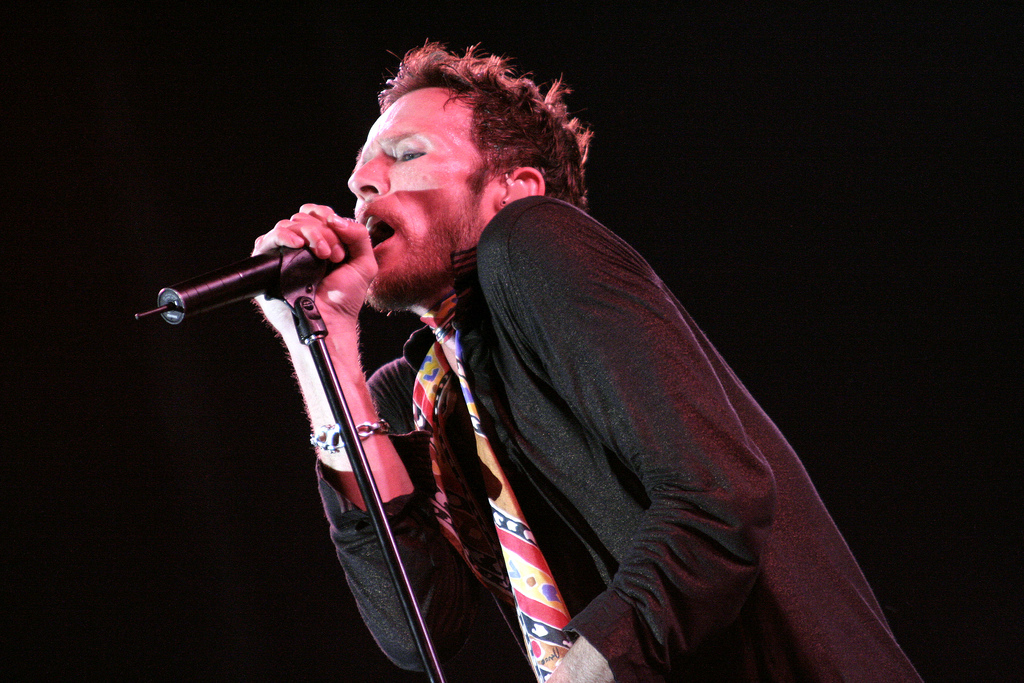
Scott Weiland in 2007

On June 26, 2012, STP released its first-ever concert film, Alive in the Windy City, on DVD and Blu-ray. The performance was filmed at a sold-out show in March 2010 at the Riviera Theatre in Chicago.

During the tour launched to celebrate the 20th anniversary of Core, the band began to experience issues, and suspicions were raised that problems within the band had arisen once again. On September 17, at a show in Abbotsford, British Columbia, the band arrived nearly two hours late and cut their set 30 minutes short, angering many fans. The following day, the band released a brief statement announcing that that night's show in Lethbridge, Alberta was cancelled due to Weiland being ordered to go on "48 hours complete vocal rest due to strained vocal cords." On December 7, in response to a public declaration from Weiland that he was "completely open" to returning to Velvet Revolver and a radio DJ's questions about the state of that band, Slash (Weiland's former bandmate with Velvet Revolver) told Minneapolis/St. Paul radio station 93X that he had heard rumors Weiland had been fired from Stone Temple Pilots, citing this as a possible reason for Weiland's eagerness to return to Velvet Revolver, something that he quickly dismissed. On February 27, 2013, Stone Temple Pilots fired Weiland, marking the band's first lineup change. The firing was officially announced as Weiland left on tour with his solo band. Both parties issued lawsuits over the right to perform with the Stone Temple Pilots name; both were settled out of court, with the DeLeo brothers and Kretz retaining the rights to perform under the name.

=== 2013–2015: Chester Bennington era and Weiland's death ===
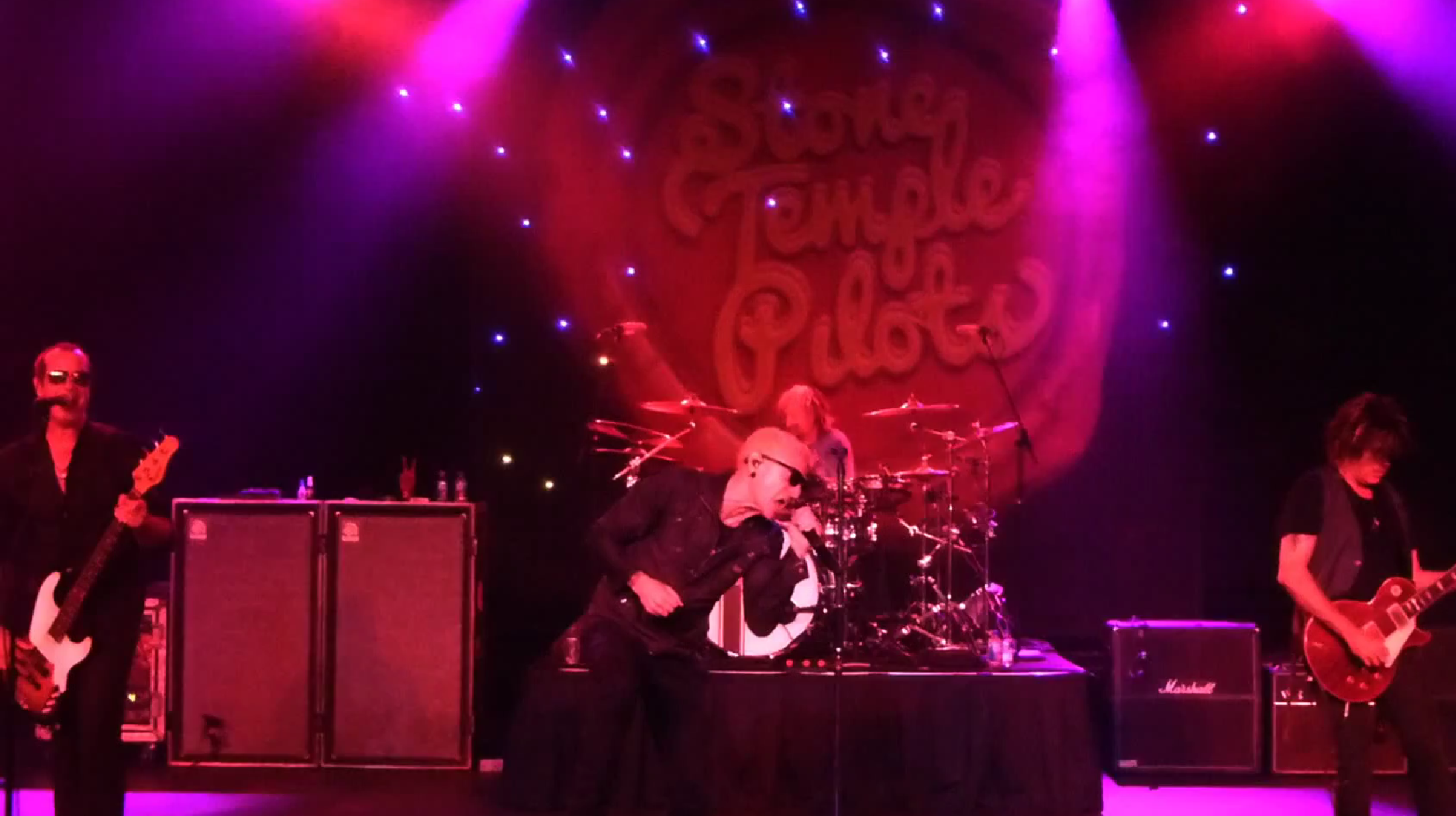
Chester Bennington (center) performing with STP in San Antonio in 2015

On May 18, 2013, the three remaining members of Stone Temple Pilots performed with Chester Bennington of Linkin Park, appearing as special guests at the 21st Annual KROQ Weenie Roast, and the May 19, 2013 Live 105 BFD festival near San Francisco, where they performed a new song, "Out of Time". On May 19, 2013, STP released a free download of their new single "Out of Time" with Bennington now an official member. Bennington had exclaimed years before in interviews that being in Stone Temple Pilots was his lifelong dream. The new lineup performed again on May 30, 2013, at the MusiCares MAP Fund Benefit Concert in Los Angeles, California, and were joined by Weiland's former bandmates Slash and Duff McKagan on stage to perform "All the Young Dudes".

On July 15, 2013, STP announced that it would embark on a small tour in September with Filter as the opening act. Stone Temple Pilots released a five-track EP titled High Rise on October 8, 2013, through Play Pen, LLC, credited as Stone Temple Pilots with Chester Bennington. The album's second single, "Black Heart", was released through iHeartRadio on September 18, 2013. They officially dropped "with Chester Bennington" from their name in March 2015. On November 9, 2015, Bennington announced he was amicably leaving Stone Temple Pilots to focus more on Linkin Park. On December 3, 2015, Scott Weiland was found dead of an accidental overdose of alcohol, pills, and cocaine on his tour bus in Minnesota. Stone Temple Pilots released a statement noting his death in which they thanked him for his time with them and said he was "gifted beyond words".

=== 2016–2018: New singer Jeff Gutt and second self-titled album ===
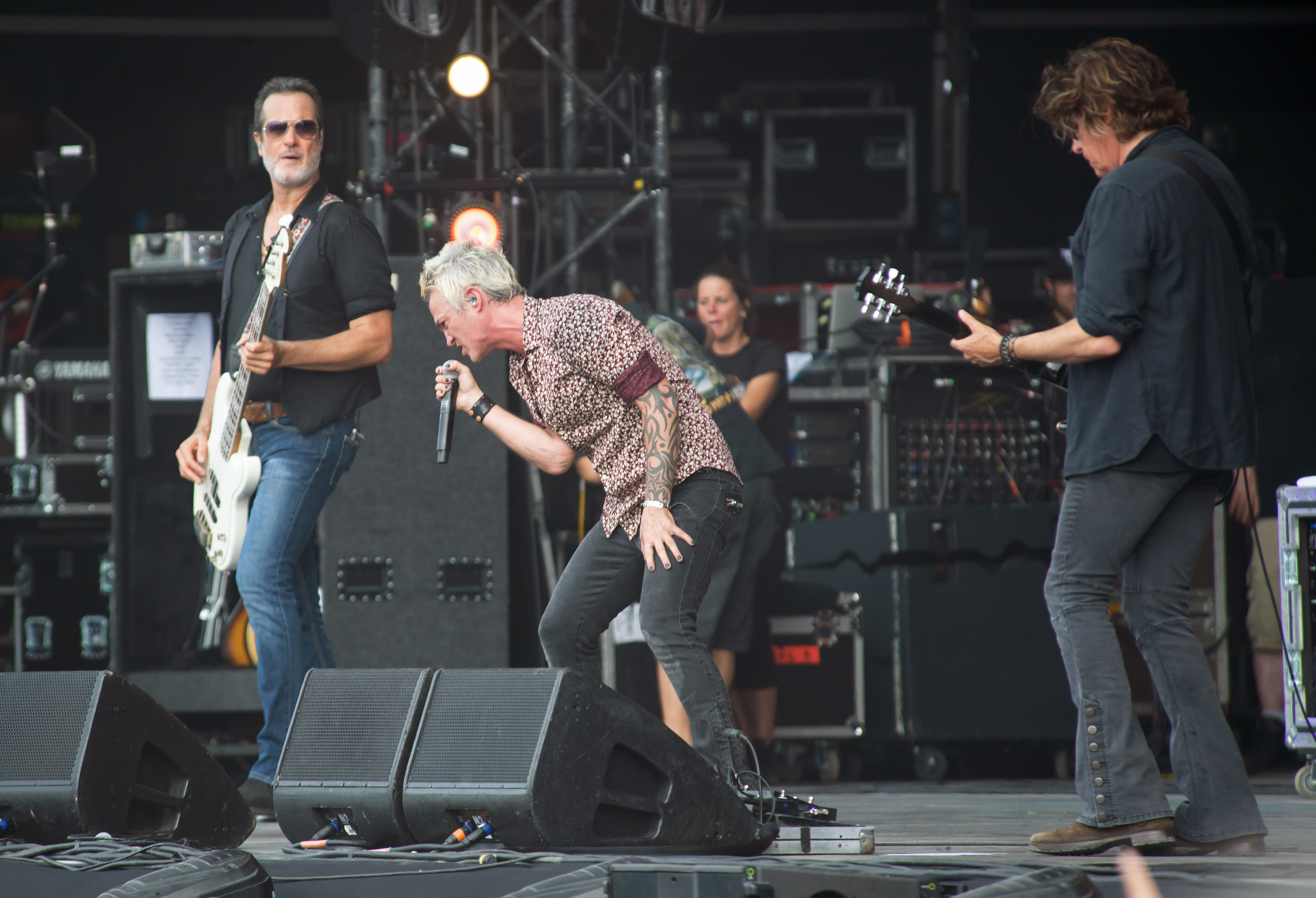
Jeff Gutt (center) with Stone Temple Pilots at Hellfest 2019.

In February 2016, Stone Temple Pilots launched an online audition for a new vocalist, stating, "If you think you have what it takes to front this band, record with this band, and tour with this band, we would dig hearing from you."

On July 26, 2017, the band announced that a 25th anniversary edition of Core would be released on September 29, 2017. The reissue includes a 25th Anniversary box set, a remastered version of the album, previously unreleased demos and b-sides, and parts of three live performances from 1993 (Castaic Lake Natural Amphitheater, Reading Festival, and MTV Unplugged). In October 2017, Dean DeLeo said that the band's search for a new vocalist was "going great", and that the band is "working on new material". On November 14, the band revealed that Jeff Gutt had been chosen as their new lead singer. On November 15, 2017, the band released the song, "Meadow". On January 31, 2018, the band released a second single, "Roll Me Under", and announced the release date of the album. The band's second self-titled album was released on March 16, 2018. In mid-2018, the band embarked on a co-headlining tour with Bush and the Cult.

=== 2019–present: Perdida and continued touring with Gutt ===
On October 4, 2019, Eric Kretz told Loudwire that a new album was complete and includes a flute solo. On December 2, the band announced that their eighth studio album, Perdida, would be released on February 7, 2020, and would be "an acoustic record largely recorded on vintage instruments". They continued to tour throughout the 2020s and co-headlined a summer U.S. tour with the band Live in 2024.

== Artistry ==
=== Musical style ===
Stone Temple Pilots' musical style is a blend of alternative rock and grunge of the 1990s, with the hard rock and psychedelic rock of the 1970s. The band is known for making each of their albums possess a unique sound, despite all having the "sonic blueprint" of the band, as Robert DeLeo describes. Stone Temple Pilots, while considered part of the first wave of alternative metal and ranked as one of the heaviest grunge bands, alongside Alice in Chains, have a softer side. Steven Hyden of UPROXX described them as a "melodic power-pop band in hard-rock clothing," inspired by glam rock, psychedelia and soft rock, as opposed to the punk and indie influences of most alternative bands.

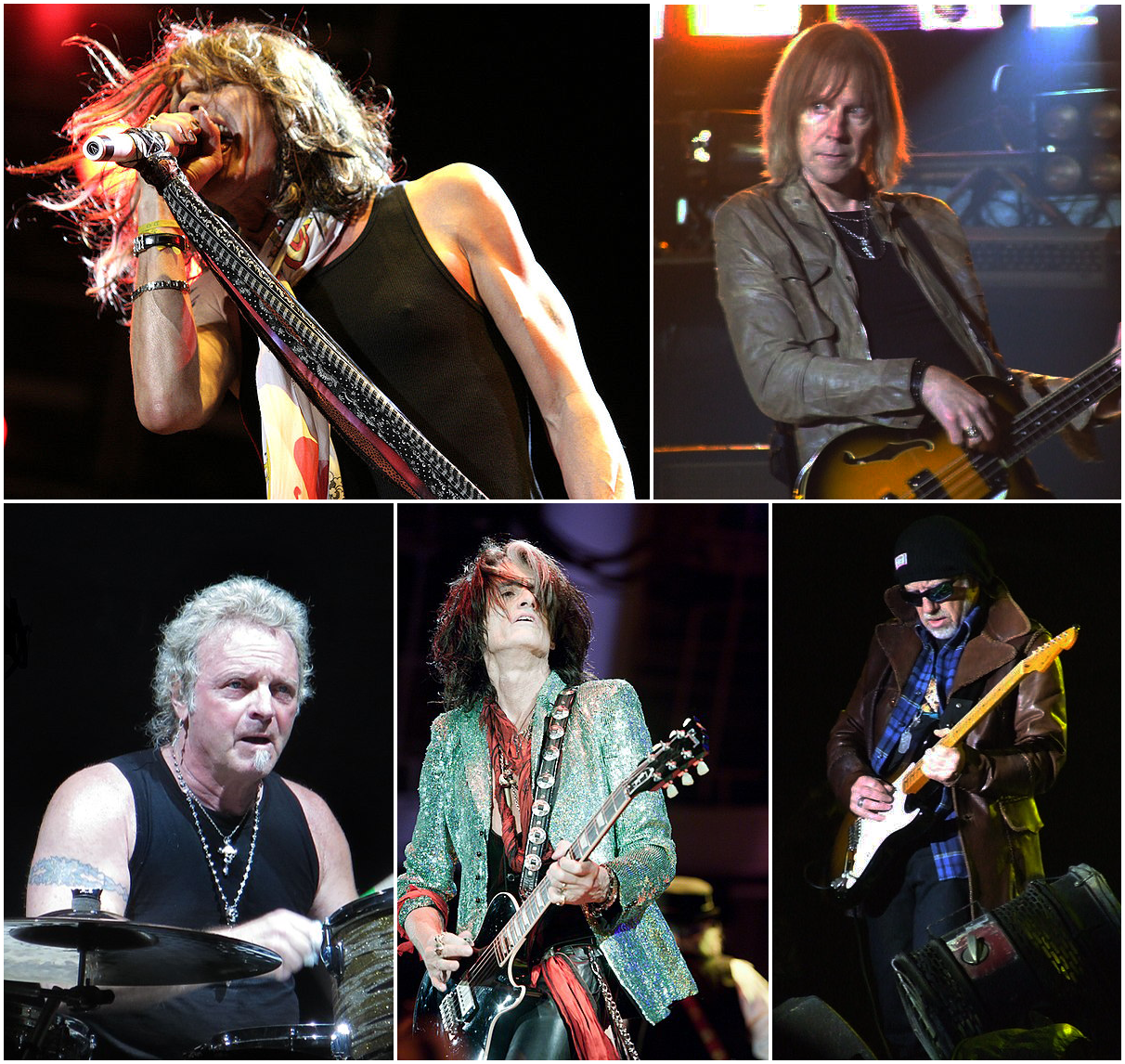
Aerosmith was a major influence on Stone Temple Pilots

Aerosmith was a large influence on the band, with Dean DeLeo acknowledging the band's influence on songs such as "Huckleberry Crumble" off their 2010 self-titled record. Steven Tyler and Joe Perry joined the band onstage at a 1996 show in Madison Square Garden for renditions of the Aerosmith songs "Sweet Emotion" and "Lick and a Promise". All of the band members were Kiss fans during their childhood, and played shows at the Roseland Ballroom in 1993 in Kiss-style makeup.

During the taping of their VH1 Storytellers performance in 2000, Weiland acknowledged artists such as the Rolling Stones, Neil Young, and Robert Plant as their musical heroes. The band has covered songs by artists such as the Beatles, Led Zeppelin, the Doors, Pink Floyd, James Brown, David Bowie, and Bob Marley both live and in the studio.

Weiland stated that his vocal style was influenced by Jim Morrison and David Bowie, who also served as his main fashion influence. Weiland has been called a chameleon due to his ability to change his vocal and fashion style. Other influences the band cited include Jane's Addiction, Soundgarden, Black Flag, Big Star, Iron Butterfly, Cheap Trick, Thin Lizzy, Aerosmith, Kiss, T. Rex, Mott the Hoople, Jethro Tull, Pink Floyd, Burt Bacharach, the Beach Boys, Astrud Gilberto, Bernie Worrell, Stevie Wonder, Sex Pistols, Genesis, Jonathan Richman and R.E.M.. In their early career, Stone Temple Pilots were frequently compared to grunge bands such as Pearl Jam. When asked about grunge in an interview, Corey Hickok stated "Scott had never heard of a band called Pearl Jam when he was writing Core. We were fans though of Alice In Chains when they came out." Weiland continued by stating:

I was a member of Sub Pop, and used to get singles every month. I saw Nirvana in 1990 I believe it was, at Raji's... In the early days, [the comparisons of STP to Grunge bands] didn’t matter to me so much, because I felt it was the first real movement in rock and roll since punk rock. It tapped into sociopolitical connotations, and pop culture. It just had a vibe. It influenced fashion, I mean it was a huge, huge movement.

After reconvening in the studio for their second album, Purple, the band's style developed, taking influence from psychedelic rock, country music, and jangle pop. The band continued to diverge into various genres and influences; for example, songs like "And So I Know" on Tiny Music... have a distinct bossa nova sound. Regarding the evolution of the band's sound, Weiland commented that "the transformation from Core to where we ended up before we took that time off, when I started with Velvet Revolver, was enormous."

Regarding the band's musical evolution, Weiland commented in 2014 that "with STP, we never stuck to it. We saw that even great movements only last a certain period of time and you don't want to be pigeonholed, so we got into other things, like the Beatles were a big influence, glam was a big influence, and it morphed along the way. I'm proud of the legacy we created and where we stand among those other peers at the time."

=== Band members ===
Dean DeLeo uses heavily layered and distorted guitar playing, while bassist Robert DeLeo draws influence from genres such as rhythm and blues, lounge music, and ragtime. Eric Kretz, known for his funk-inflected style, evolved from strictly heel-up drumming, to a heel-down approach in order to get more power.

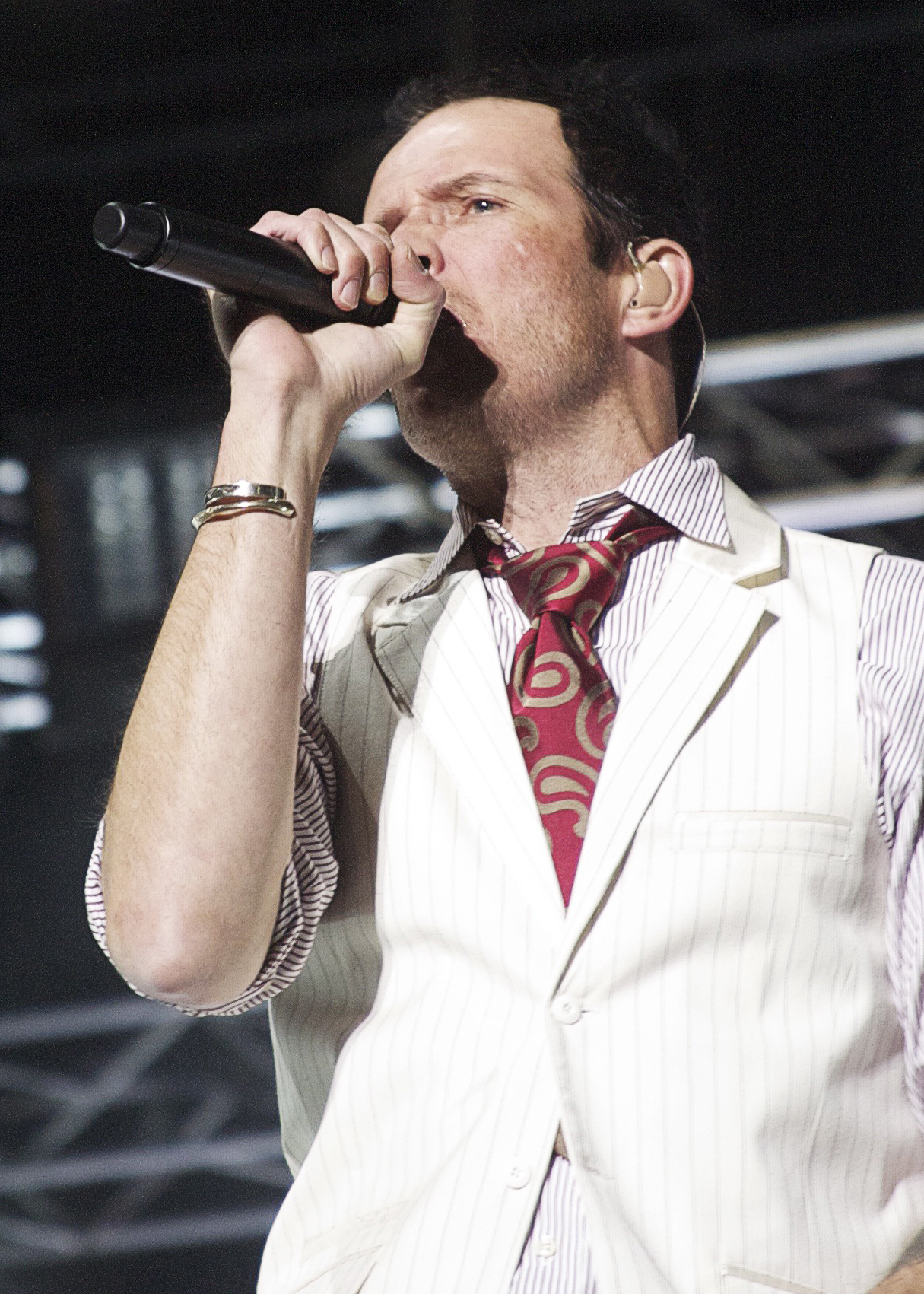
Scott Weiland, known for his versatile vocal style

Weiland was the band's primary lyricist. His style changed with the band's evolution; much of the lyrics on Core were written about societal issues such as religion, abuse of power, and isolation. The band's breakthrough single "Sex Type Thing" polarized critics with its lyrics, some interpreting it as advocacy of date rape. Weiland intended it as a feminist anthem, with its lyrics written in mockery of the narrator. As Weiland began to deal with substance abuse, his lyrics became more personal and intricate; songs like "Interstate Love Song" deal with his addiction's tolls on his relationship with his then-wife, Janina. The lyrics of the band's fourth album were written to provide closure to his marriage and addiction to heroin.

Following the band's reunion in 2008, Weiland once again evolved as a songwriter, explaining: "[In] the '90s, I was so overwhelmed with my heroin addiction, and so a lot of the stuff was just from my point of view. Now, I tend to look at some of the greats like Leonard Cohen and Bob Dylan. I look at their storytelling [and] I try to tell stories. Every song doesn't have to be narcissistically written about how I feel on that day."

== Legacy ==
Core, certified 8× platinum by the RIAA, drove the band to popularity. Stone Temple Pilots went on to become one of the most commercially successful rock bands of the 1990s, selling 40 million records worldwide, including 17.5 million units in the United States, before their dissolution in 2003. The band has had 16 top ten singles on the Billboard rock charts, eight of which peaked at No. 1, and one No. 1 album for Purple in 1994. That same year, the band won a Grammy for "Best Hard Rock Performance" for the song "Plush" from the album Core. Stone Temple Pilots were also ranked No. 40 on VH1's The 100 Greatest Artists of Hard Rock.

Despite being unpopular with critics in their heyday, Stone Temple Pilots have proven to be a popular and influential act. In retrospect, MTV writer James Montgomery published an article questioning the validity of music critics' opinions of the band during the 90s, saying, "All I'm suggesting is that perhaps it's time to admit that we were wrong about them from the get-go—that we treated them unfairly." In a review of the band's 2003 greatest hits collection Thank You, AllMusic critic Stephen Erlewine wrote that "STP made music that sounded great at the time and even better now", and that "this music has stood the test of time", calling Thank You "nearly perfect". Erlewine also wrote that "STP was the best straight-ahead rock singles outfit of their time."

After the death of Scott Weiland, Smashing Pumpkins singer Billy Corgan paid official tribute to the band and musician, calling him one of the greatest voices of their generation:

"It was, I'd guess you'd say, my way of apology for having been so critical of STP when they appeared on the scene like some crazy, man-fueled rocket. And not only was the knight up front freshly handsome to a fault, but he could sing too! As any supreme actor gives a real and different voice to each character played. It was STP's 3rd album that had got me hooked, a wizardly mix of glam and post-punk, and I confessed to Scott, as well as the band many times, how wrong I'd been in assessing their native brilliance. And like Bowie can and does, it was Scott's phrasing that pushed his music into a unique, and hard to pin down, aesthetic sonicsphere. Lastly, I'd like to share a thought which though clumsy, I hope would please Scott In Hominum. And that is if you asked me who I truly believed were the great voices of our generation, I'd say it were he, Layne, and Kurt."

Media outlets reported on Weiland's death stating he was a "powerful voice" with a "mercurial vocal style" during his time with Stone Temple Pilots.

On December 3, 2016, STP posted a tribute on their website to mark the first anniversary of Weiland's death. In 2017, Metal Injection ranked Stone Temple Pilots at number 9 on their list of "10 Heaviest Grunge Bands".

== Band members ==
Current members

- Robert DeLeo – bass, backing vocals, occasional guitar (1989–2003, 2008–present)
- Eric Kretz – drums, percussion (1989–2003, 2008–present)
- Dean DeLeo – guitars (1989–2003, 2008–present)
- Jeff Gutt – lead vocals (2017–present)

Former members

- Scott Weiland – lead vocals (1989–2003, 2008–2013); died 2015
- Chester Bennington – lead vocals (2013–2015); died 2017

Timeline

== Discography ==
Studio albums

- Core (1992)
- Purple (1994)
- Tiny Music... Songs from the Vatican Gift Shop (1996)
- No. 4 (1999)
- Shangri-La Dee Da (2001)
- Stone Temple Pilots (2010)
- Stone Temple Pilots (2018)
- Perdida (2020)

== Awards ==
Year	Nominee / work	Award	Result
1993	"Plush"	MTV Video Music Award for Best New Artist	Won
1993	"Plush"	MTV Video Music Award for Best Alternative Video	Nominated
1993	"Plush"	Billboard Music Award for #1 Rock Song of the Year	Won
1994	-	American Music Award for Favorite Pop/Rock New Artist	Won
1994	-	Billboard Music Award for Top Modern Rock Act of the Year	Won
1994	"Plush"	Grammy Award for Best Hard Rock Performance	Won
1994	-	Concert Industry Awards for Best New Rock Artist Tour	Won
1995	-	American Music Award for Favorite Heavy Metal/Hard Rock Artist	Nominated
1995	-	American Music Award for Favorite Pop/Rock Band/Duo/Group	Nominated
1995	"Interstate Love Song"	MTV Video Music Award for Best Alternative Video	Nominated
1995	"Interstate Love Song"	MTV Video Music Award for Best Metal/Hard Rock Video	Nominated
1995	"Interstate Love Song"	MTV Video Music Award for Best Group Video	Nominated
1995	"Interstate Love Song"	MTV Video Music Award for Best Cinematography	Nominated
1995	"Big Empty"	MTV Movie Award for Best Song From a Movie	Won
1996	"Interstate Love Song"	ASCAP Pop Music Award for Most Performed Song	Won
1997	"Trippin' on a Hole in a Paper Heart"	Grammy Award for Best Hard Rock Performance	Nominated
1997	-	American Music Award for Favorite Metal/Hard Rock Artist	Nominated
1997	-	American Music Award for Favorite Alternative Artist	Nominated
2000	"Sour Girl"	MTV Video Music Award for Best Cinematography	Nominated
2001	"Down"	Grammy Award for Best Hard Rock Performance	Nominated
2010	-	Guys Choice for Ballsiest Band	Won
2011	"Between the Lines"	Grammy Award for Best Hard Rock Performance	Nominated
