= Robert DeLeo =

American rock musician

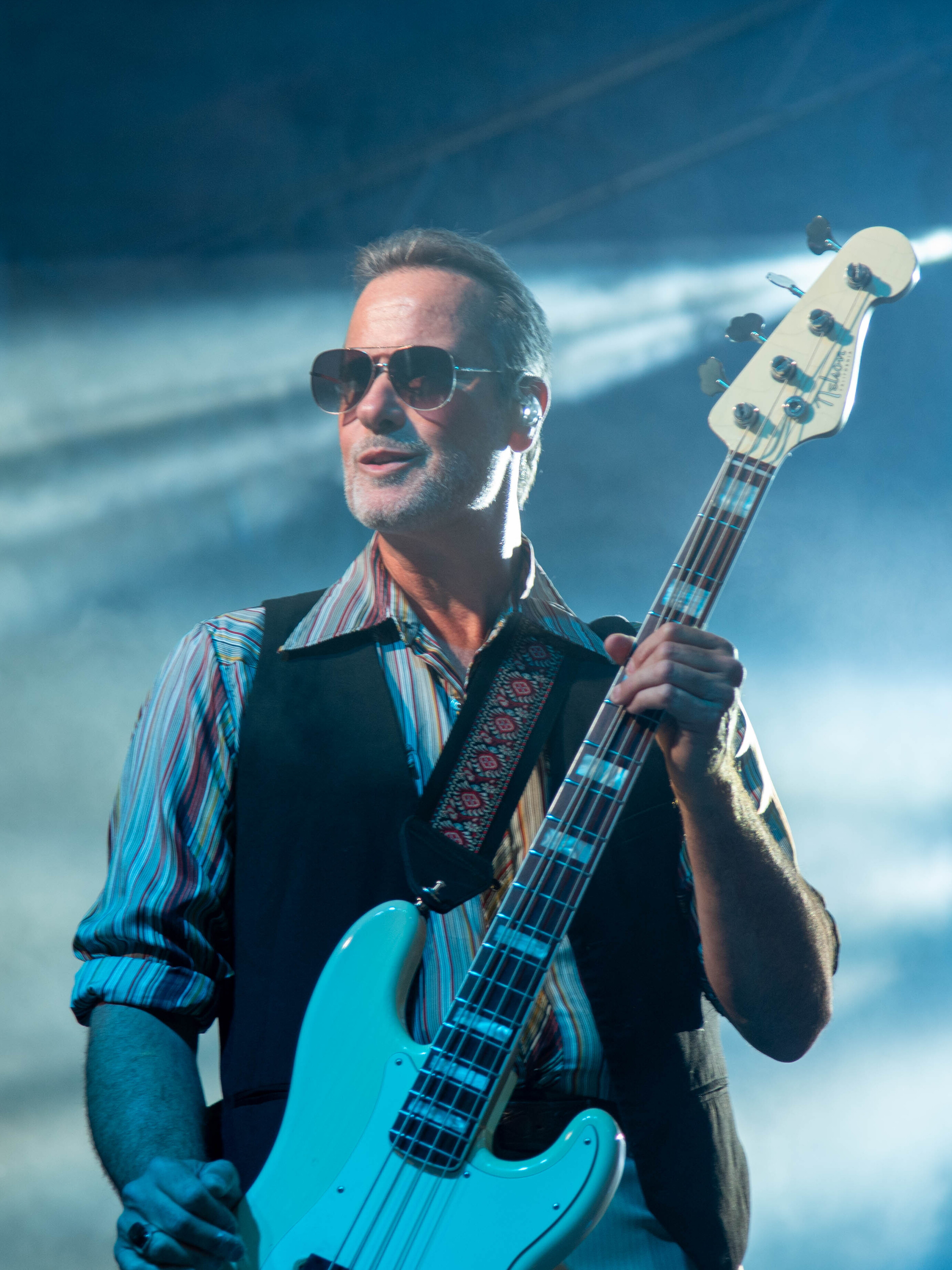
- DeLeo performing in 2024

Background information
- Also known as: Robert De Leo
- Born: Robert Emile DeLeo; February 2, 1966 (age 60); Montclair, New Jersey, U.S.
- Genres: Alternative rock, grunge, hard rock
- Occupations: Musician, songwriter, producer
- Instruments: Bass guitar, guitar
- Years active: 1985–present
- Label: Atlantic

Robert Emile DeLeo (born February 2, 1966) is an American musician, best known as the bassist for rock band Stone Temple Pilots. He is part of Delta Deep and he has also played in Talk Show and Army of Anyone. He is the younger brother of Stone Temple Pilots guitarist Dean DeLeo. He is also the former bass player for the supergroup Hollywood Vampires.

== Early life ==
DeLeo and his older brother Dean were both born in Montclair, New Jersey, and raised in the Jersey Shore community of Point Pleasant Beach. He graduated from Point Pleasant Borough High School in 1984. He is of Italian, Irish and Swedish ancestry.

Their older half-brother is actor Scott Marlowe.

== Career ==
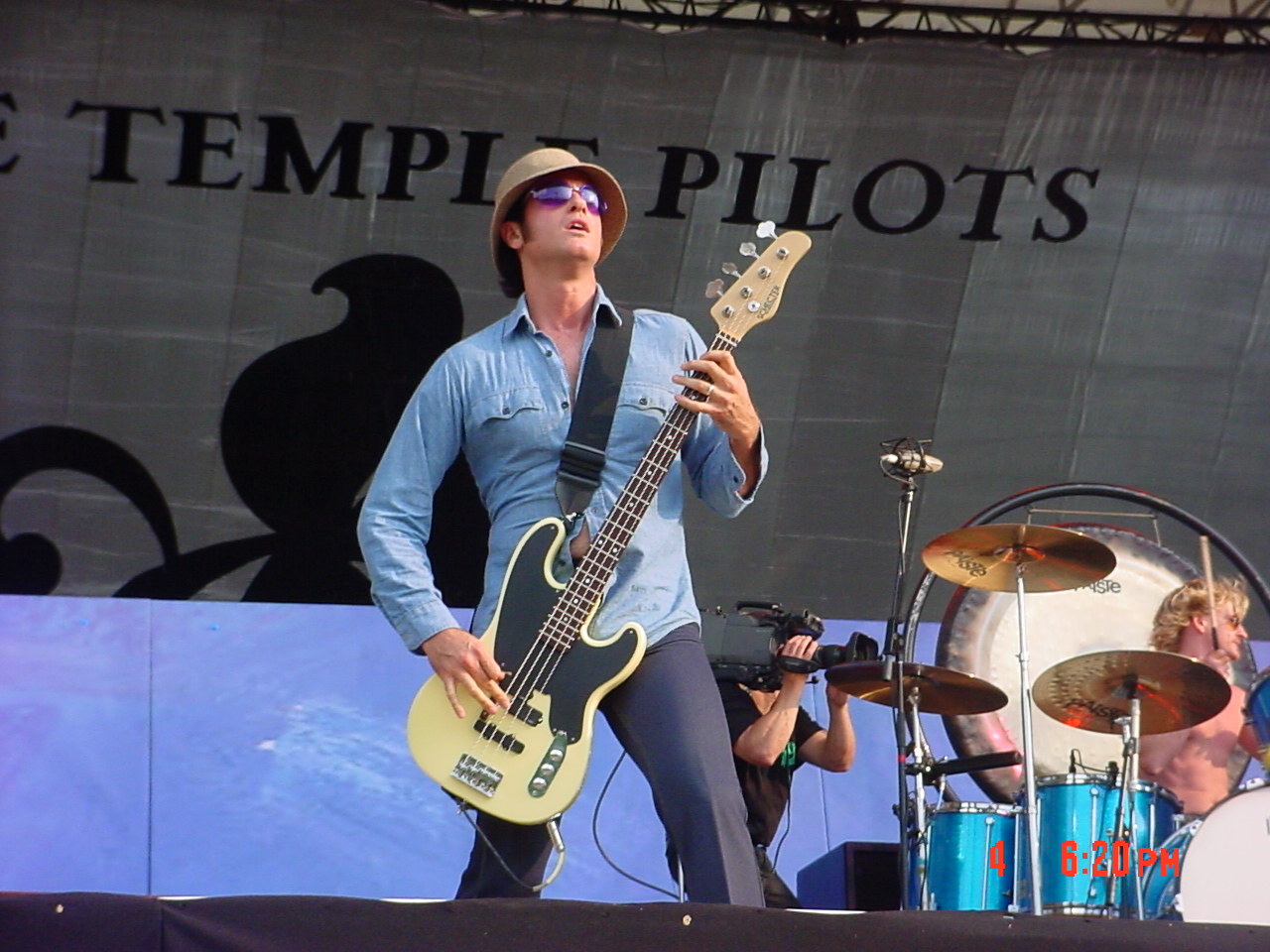
DeLeo performing at the Rolling Rock Town Fair in 2001

=== Stone Temple Pilots (1985–2003, 2008–present) ===
In 1985, Scott Weiland and his friends in their band Soi Disant – guitarist Corey Hicock and drummer David Allin – first encountered DeLeo playing live at various gigs, deciding to track him down after witnessing his shows. Their newly formed band, who would eventually be joined by Eric Kretz and Robert's older brother Dean, played many gigs in Los Angeles bars, and were eventually signed onto Atlantic Records in 1992. However, the name "Mighty Joe Young" had already been taken, so the band was forced to change their name and tossed around ideas like "Shirley Temple's Pussy" and "Sticky Toilet Paper" before changing it to "Stone Temple Pilots", which, according to Weiland, has no specific meaning, other than that it retained the STP initials.

During their years of greatest success in the 1990s, Stone Temple Pilots came to be one of the most successful bands of the decade. DeLeo is credited with much of the band's music, including the famous intros for the songs "Plush" and "Interstate Love Song". Although sales of their records exceeded over 30 million, the band disbanded due to Weiland's ongoing problems with drug abuse.

Stone Temple Pilots reunited in early 2008 and released their self-titled sixth studio album on May 25, 2010. On October 8, 2013, they released an EP entitled High Rise with new lead singer Chester Bennington of Linkin Park fame.

=== Later collaborations, 1997–present ===
During Stone Temple Pilots' hiatus in 1997 due to Weiland's run-ins with the law, DeLeo, his brother Dean, and Kretz joined with singer Dave Coutts of Ten Inch Men and formed Talk Show. Released in 1997 on Atlantic Records, their eponymous debut album peaked at #131 on the Billboard 200 and was considered a commercial flop. Coutts was eventually fired and the band disbanded. Weiland went into rehab and released a solo album during this time.

After Stone Temple Pilots' break-up in 2003, DeLeo and his brother Dean joined Filter frontman Richard Patrick and drummer Ray Luzier to form the band Army of Anyone. The group met after Patrick contacted the DeLeos about writing material for Filter's fourth album. The band eventually called in Luzier in for an audition, found the formula worked, and the band was formed. The band's self-titled debut album was released in November 2006. The album became a critical success; some went as far to label the album as one of the best of the year. DeLeo summed up his sound on the album as follows;

I kind of combined bass stuff with some guitar stuff to achieve my sound—I've really been going nuts on eBay! I'm still trying to achieve this one bass sound I keep hearing in my head—kind of taking James Jamerson's feel and mixing that with John Entwistle's or Chris Squire's sound. So it's a funky bottom, with a really aggressive top. The sound on this record is the closest I've gotten to that.

However, Army of Anyone ended up going on "indefinite hiatus" in 2007 after low album sales and Patrick's return to Filter.

In 2007, DeLeo played bass on songs for Japanese rock band B'z, including two on their album Action. He also contributes bass to five songs on their 2019 album New Love, including "Rain & Dream" which also features Joe Perry.

In 2016, DeLeo appeared with Kings of Chaos.

In 2025, DeLeo performed with The Joe Perry Project during a short tour in August and September.

=== Solo career (2022–present) ===
On September 29, 2022, DeLeo announced his debut solo album Lessons Learned and released its lead single "Love is Not Made of Gold", featuring Jimmy Gnecco, the same day.

=== Equipment and style ===
DeLeo is known for his smooth style of playing, with infusions of jazz, '60s rhythm and blues, and hard rock creating a distinctive tone. His primary influence is Motown bassist James Jamerson. Other influences include John Entwistle of the Who, Rocco Prestia of Tower of Power, Chris Squire of Yes, and John Paul Jones of Led Zeppelin.

Although he primarily uses the Schecter bass live, for recording purposes he has used a wide variety of basses, and has a fondness for oddball off-brand basses from the 1960s, particularly short-scale hollowbody basses which he strung with flat wound strings.

Stone Temple Pilots' debut album Core was recorded with a Jazz-type bass prototype version of his Schecter Model-T bass, a G&L L2000, and an Ampeg SVT amplifier with an 8x10 cabinet. Purple, their second album, was recorded with his live rig. DeLeo's usual studio rig for most of Tiny Music... Songs from the Vatican Gift Shop, all of No. 4, and all of Shangri-La Dee Da, all by Stone Temple Pilots, was more complicated; he split his signal, bi-amping it to a '67 50-watt Marshall Plexi guitar head with '69 Marshall keyboard 8x10 cabinet, and a '59 Fender Bassman amplifier with a custom 1x15 cabinet. This configuration, which DeLeo noted in a Bass Player Magazine article as being an idea he lifted from Chris Squire of Yes, allowed him to use distorted and clean sounds simultaneously and produce more workable sounds on tape by blending the signals to taste.

== Personal life ==
DeLeo is married to Kristen and has two sons. He lives in Palos Verdes, California.

== Discography ==
- Lessons Learned (2022)
