= Filter discography =

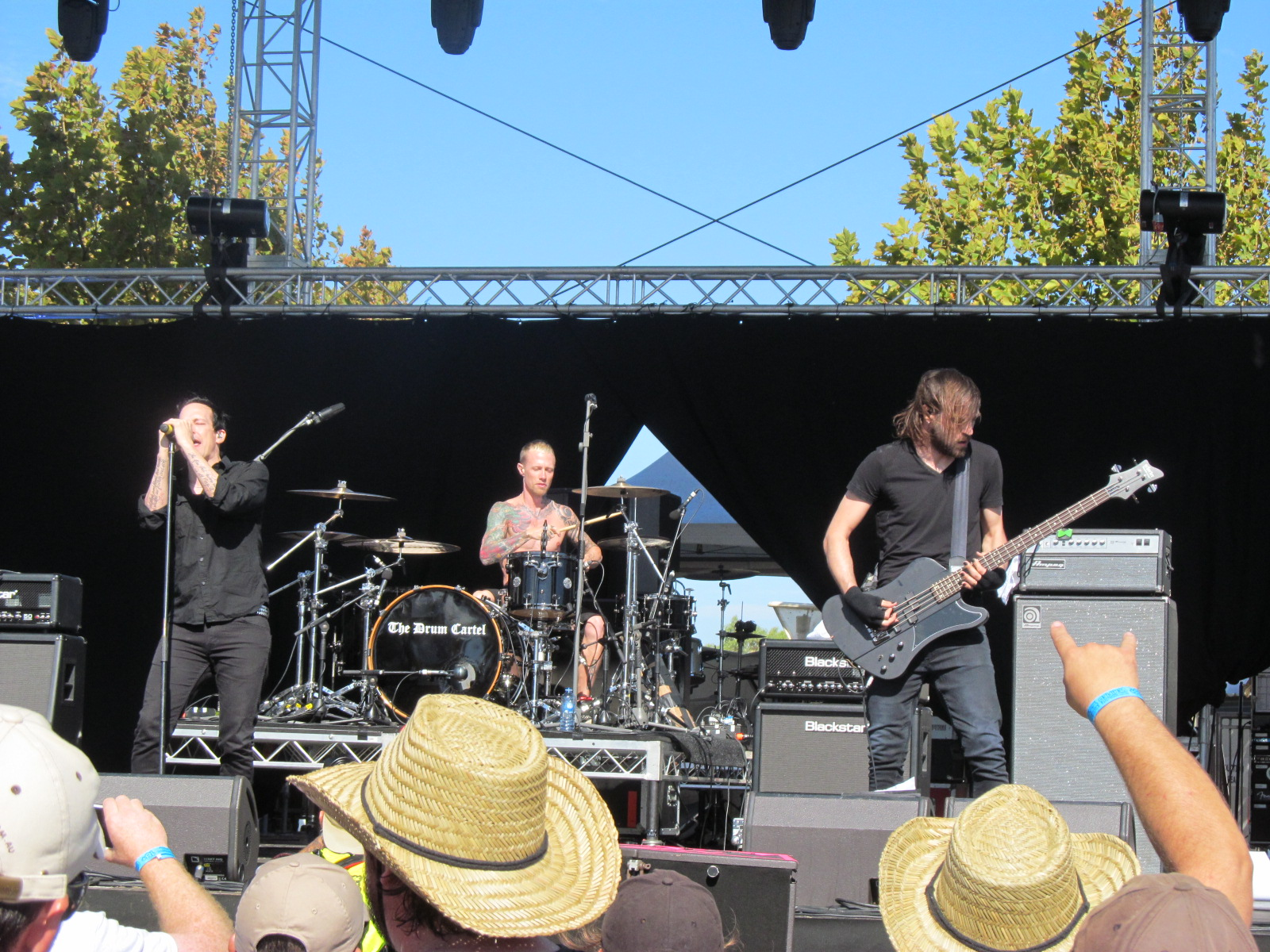
- Filter in 2014
- Studio albums: 8
- Extended plays: 2
- Compilation albums: 1
- Singles: 20
- Video albums: 2
- Music videos: 11
- Remix albums: 1
- Promotional singles: 3

The discography of Filter, an American rock band, consists of eight studio albums, one compilation album, one remix album, two video albums, two extended plays, 20 singles and 11 music videos.

== Albums ==
=== Studio albums ===
List of studio albums, with selected chart positions and certifications
Title	Album details	Peak chart positions										Certifications
Title	Album details	US	US Alt.	US Hard Rock	AUS	AUT	CAN	GER	NZ	SWI	UK	Certifications
Short Bus	Released: April 25, 1995 (US); Label: Reprise, Warner Bros.; Formats: CD, digital download, LP, MC	59	—	—	—	—	65	—	—	—	—	RIAA: Platinum
Title of Record	Released: August 24, 1999 (US); Label: Reprise, Warner Bros.; Formats: CD, digital download, LP, MC	30	—	—	41	34	40	20	12	—	75	RIAA: Platinum; MC: Gold
The Amalgamut	Released: July 30, 2002 (US); Label: Reprise, Warner Bros.; Formats: CD, digital download, MC	32	—	—	43	12	24	17	—	78	68	
Anthems for the Damned	Released: May 13, 2008 (US); Label: Pulse; Formats: CD, digital download	60	12	6	—	—	—	—	—	—	—	
The Trouble with Angels	Released: August 17, 2010 (US); Label: Rocket Science Ventures; Formats: CD, digital download, LP	64	12	7	—	—	—	—	—	—	—	
The Sun Comes Out Tonight	Released: June 4, 2013 (US); Label: Wind-up; Formats: CD, digital download, LP	52	16	5	—	—	—	—	—	—	—	
Crazy Eyes	Released: April 8, 2016 (US); Label: Wind-up; Formats: CD, digital download, LP	151	14	4	—	—	—	—	—	—	—	
The Algorithm	Released: August 25, 2023 (US); Label: Golden Robot; Formats: CD, digital download, LP	—	—	—	—	—	—	—	—	—	—	
"—" denotes a recording that did not chart or was not released in that territory.

=== Compilation albums ===
List of compilation albums
Title	Album details
The Very Best Things (1995–2008)	Released: March 31, 2009 (US); Label: Rhino; Formats: CD, digital download

=== Remix albums ===
List of remix albums
Title	Album details
Remixes for the Damned	Released: November 4, 2008 (US); Label: Pulse; Formats: Digital download

=== Video albums ===
List of video albums
Title	Album details
Phenomenology	Released: October 22, 1996 (US); Label: Reprise, Warner Bros.; Formats: VHS
Title of DVD	Released: 1999 (US); Label: Warner Bros.; Formats: DVD

== Extended plays ==
List of extended plays
Title	Details
Erkenntnistheorie	Released: 1994 (US); Label: Reprise; Formats: MC
Title of EP	Released: 2000 (US); Label: Reprise; Formats: CD

== Singles ==
List of singles, with selected chart positions, showing year released, certifications, and album name
Title	Year	Peak chart positions										Certifications	Album
Title	Year	US	US Alt.	US Main. Rock	US Rock Air.	AUS	CAN	CAN Alt.	GER	NZ	UK	Certifications	Album
"Hey Man Nice Shot"	1995	76	10	19	—	—	—	14	—	—	—		Short Bus
"Dose"	1995	—	— (Note: "Dose" peaked number 48 on the US Alternative 50 Radio & Records chart in 1995, but did not enter the Billboard Alternative Airplay chart.)	—	—	—	—	16	—	—	—		Short Bus
"Jurassitol"	1996	—	—	—	—	—	—	23	—	—	—		The Crow: City of Angels soundtrack
"(Can't You) Trip Like I Do" (with The Crystal Method)	1997	—	29	—	—	79	—	—	—	—	39		Spawn: The Album
"One"	1998	—	—	—	—	—	—	—	—	—	—		The X-Files: The Album
"Welcome to the Fold"	1999	—	17	8	—	—	—	—	—	42	85		Title of Record
"Take a Picture"	1999	12	3	4	—	32	3	1	98	8	25	RMNZ: Gold	Title of Record
"The Best Things"	2000	—	18	31	—	—	—	25	—	—	—		Title of Record
"Where Do We Go from Here"	2002	94	11	12	—	83	—	—	—	—	80		The Amalgamut
"American Cliché"	2002	—	—	40	—	—	—	—	—	—	—		The Amalgamut
"Soldiers of Misfortune"	2008	—	—	27	—	—	—	—	—	—	—		Anthems for the Damned
"What's Next"	2008	—	—	—	—	—	—	—	—	—	—		Anthems for the Damned
"Happy Together"	2009	—	—	—	—	—	—	—	—	—	—		The Stepfather soundtrack
"Fades Like a Photograph"	2009	—	—	—	—	—	—	—	—	—	—		2012 soundtrack/The Trouble with Angels
"The Inevitable Relapse"	2010	—	—	—	—	—	—	—	—	—	—		The Trouble with Angels
"No Love"	2010	—	—	—	—	—	—	—	—	—	—		The Trouble with Angels
"Gimme All Your Lovin'"	2011	—	—	—	—	—	—	—	—	—	—		ZZ Top: A Tribute from Friends
"What Do You Say"	2013	—	—	16	40	—	—	—	—	—	—		The Sun Comes Out Tonight
"Surprise"	2013	—	—	37	—	—	—	—	—	—	—		The Sun Comes Out Tonight
"We Hate It When You Get What You Want"	2014	—	—	—	—	—	—	—	—	—	—		The Sun Comes Out Tonight
"Take Me to Heaven"	2016	—	—	—	—	—	—	—	—	—	—		Crazy Eyes
"Nothing in My Hands"	2016	—	—	—	—	—	—	—	—	—	—		Crazy Eyes
"Thoughts and Prayers"	2020	—	—	—	—	—	—	—	—	—	—		The Algorithm: Ultra Edition
"Murica"	2020	—	—	—	—	—	—	—	—	—	—		The Algorithm: Ultra Edition
"For the Beaten"	2022	—	—	—	—	—	—	—	—	—	—		The Algorithm
"Face Down"	2023	—	—	—	—	—	—	—	—	—	—		The Algorithm
"Obliteration"	2023	—	—	—	—	—	—	—	—	—	—		The Algorithm
"The Gunslingers of Redemption"	2025	—	—	—	—	—	—	—	—	—	—		Gunslingers soundtrack
"All the Good"	2025	—	—	—	—	—	—	—	—	—	—		The Algorithm: Ultra Edition
"—" denotes a recording that did not chart or was not released in that territory.

=== Promotional singles ===
List of promotional singles, showing year released and album name
Title	Year	Album
"Under"	1995	Short Bus
"Kill the Day"	2008	Anthems for the Damned
"The Hand That's Dealt"	2014	The Sun Comes Out Tonight
"Mother E"	2016	Crazy Eyes

=== Collaboration singles ===
List of singles with other artists, with selected chart positions, showing year released and album name
Title	Year	Peak chart positions			Album
Title	Year	US Alt.	AUS	UK	Album
"(Can't You) Trip Like I Do" (with The Crystal Method)	1997	29	79	39	Spawn: The Album
"Free to Die" (with Health)	2024	—	—	—	Rat Wars Ultra Edition
"Volatile" (with Deadly Apples)	2025	—	—	—	Distress
"Blue Sky Mystery" (with Finger Eleven)	2025	—	—	—	Last Night on Earth
"—" denotes a recording that did not chart or was not released in that territory.

== Soundtrack appearances ==
List of non-single guest appearances, showing year released and album name
Title	Year	Album
"Thanks Bro"	1996	Songs in the Key of X
"Take a Picture"	2000	Totally Hits, Vol. 2
"It's Gonna Kill Me"	2001	3000 Miles to Graceland soundtrack
"The Only Way (Is the Wrong Way)"	2003	Lara Croft Tomb Raider: The Cradle of Life soundtrack
"Take a Picture" (Hybrid Mix)	2004	The Girl Next Door soundtrack
"What's Next" (The Blood & Sand Mix)	2008	Saw V soundtrack

== Music videos ==
Year	Song	Director(s)
1995	"Hey Man, Nice Shot"	Kevin Kerslake
1995	"Dose"	Kevin Kerslake
1996	"Stuck in Here"	John Cook
1996	"Jurassitol"	Dean Karr
1997	"(Can't You) Trip Like I Do" (with The Crystal Method)	Floria Sigismondi
1998	"One"	Martin Weisz
1999	"Welcome to the Fold"	Peter Christopherson
1999	"Take a Picture"	David Meyers
2000	"The Best Things"	Peter Christopherson and Richard Patrick
2002	"Where Do We Go from Here?"	Alexander Kosta
2002	"American Cliché"	
2008	"Soldiers of Misfortune"	Evan Lane
2010	"The Inevitable Relapse"	Jesus M. Rodriguez
2010	"Fades Like a Photograph"	Mark Racco
2010	"No Love"	Mark Racco
2011	"Gimme All Your Lovin'"	
2013	"What Do You Say"	Kyle Thrash
2014	"Surprise"	Gus Black
2015	"We Hate It When You Get What You Want"	David Kinsler
2015	"Happy Together"	David Kinsler
2016	"Take Me To Heaven"	David Kinsler
2017	"Mother E"	Lukasz Pytlik
2020	"Thoughts and Prayers"	Richard Patrick
2020	"Murica"	Vicente Cordero
2023	"Face Down"	Vicente Cordero
2023	"Obliteration"	Atanas Shopski
2024	"Burn Out the Sun"	Mark Lupo
2025	"All the Good"	Mark Lupo
