= The Very Best Things (1995–2008) =

Greatest hits album by Filter
- Released: March 31, 2009
- Recorded: 1995–2008
- Genre: Industrial rock; alternative rock; alternative metal; industrial metal; post-grunge
- Length: 65:55
- Label: Rhino
- Producer: Richard Patrick; Brian Liesegang; Jeff Most; David Was; The Crystal Method; Ben Grosse; Rae DiLeo; Geno Lenardo; Josh Abraham

Filter chronology
Anthems for the Damned (2008)	The Very Best Things (1995–2008) (2009)	The Trouble with Angels (2010)

Professional ratings
Review scores
Source	Rating
AllMusic	4/5 stars
Sound Sphere	3/5

The Very Best Things (1995–2008) is a greatest hits compilation album by American rock band Filter. It was released on March 31, 2009, through Rhino Records.

== Overview ==
The album contains songs from Filter's first four studio albums: Short Bus, Title of Record, The Amalgamut, and Anthems for the Damned. Additionally, the compilation features songs from The Crow: City of Angels Soundtrack, Spawn: The Album, The X-Files: The Album, and Songs in the Key of X. All of the songs were remastered for the compilation.

== Track listing ==
All tracks are written by Richard Patrick, except where noted.

The Very Best Things (1995–2008) track listing
No.	Title	Writer(s)	Album	Length
1.	"Hey Man Nice Shot"		Short Bus	5:15
2.	"Welcome to the Fold" (single edit)		Title of Record	4:42
3.	"Jurassitol"		The Crow: City of Angels Soundtrack	5:13
4.	"(Can't You) Trip Like I Do" (featuring The Crystal Method)	Scott Kirkland, Ken D. Jordan	Spawn: The Album	4:27
5.	"Take a Picture" (radio edit)		Title of Record	3:41
6.	"Soldiers of Misfortune"		Anthems for the Damned	4:25
7.	"Where Do We Go from Here" (single edit)	Patrick, Geno Lenardo	The Amalgamut	4:04
8.	"Dose"		Short Bus	3:54
9.	"I'm Not the Only One"		Title of Record	5:52
10.	"Skinny"	Patrick, Lenardo	Title of Record	5:44
11.	"One" (Harry Nilsson cover)	Nilsson	The X-Files: The Album	4:40
12.	"The Best Things"		Title of Record	4:26
13.	"The Only Way (Is the Wrong Way)"	Patrick, Lenardo	The Amalgamut	5:15
14.	"Thanks Bro"		Songs in the Key of X	4:10
Total length:				65:55

== Personnel ==
Filter

- Richard Patrick – lead vocals, guitar, programming, keyboards, bass, drums
- Brian Liesegang – guitar, programming, keyboards, drums (tracks 1, 3, 4, 8, 14)
- Geno Lenardo – guitar, bass, programming (tracks 2, 3, 5, 7, 9, 10, 12, 13)
- John 5 – guitar (track 6)
- Frank Cavanagh – bass (tracks 2, 3, 5, 7, 9, 10, 12, 13)
- Steven Gillis – drums (tracks 2, 5, 7, 9, 10, 12, 13)
- Matt Walker – drums (track 3)
- Josh Freese – drums (track 6)
