= The Amalgamut =

Studio album by Filter
- Released: July 30, 2002
- Recorded: 2001–2002
- Genres: Industrial rock; hard rock; industrial metal
- Length: 57:35
- Label: Reprise
- Producers: Ben Grosse; Richard Patrick; Rae DiLeo; Geno Lenardo

Filter chronology
Title of Record (1999)	The Amalgamut (2002)	Anthems for the Damned (2008)

Singles from The Amalgamut
- 1. "Where Do We Go from Here" Released: June 20, 2002; 2. "American Cliché" Released: 2002

The Amalgamut is the third studio album by the American rock band Filter, released on July 30, 2002, by Reprise Records. Unlike their first two albums Short Bus (1995) and Title of Record (1999), which were both certified platinum, the album stalled prior to hitting 100,000 copies sold, in part due to frontman Richard Patrick cancelling its main tour in order to enter a rehab facility. The album still had two singles released in its promotion: "Where Do We Go from Here" and "American Cliché". The Amalgamut was the last album to feature band members Geno Lenardo, Frank Cavanagh, and Steve Gillis, with Patrick starting up the band Army of Anyone upon getting out of rehab. It was the last Filter album to be released until six years later, when Patrick reformed the band with new members and released 2008's Anthems for the Damned.

== Background ==
In 1995, Filter found great success with their debut album Short Bus, which went platinum in the United States, based on the strength of their single "Hey Man, Nice Shot". However, many complications arose upon attempting to create a follow-up in the late 1990s. The first album had been written and recorded by the band's two sole members frontman Richard Patrick and band member Brian Liesegang. When the two attempted to record a follow-up, they found they had wanted to take the band in different directions; Liesesgang wanted to go into a more electronic direction, whereas Patrick wanted to pursue a more rock-oriented direction. Liesegang eventually left, leaving Patrick as the sole member of the band. He attempted to create an album by himself with producer Rae Dileo, but after some unsuccessful sessions, Patrick decided he did not want to create an album alone, and proceeded to attempt to recruit Short Bus touring members Geno Lenardo, Frank Cavanaugh, and Matt Walker. Lenardo and Cavanaugh joined up, but Walker had temporarily joined the Smashing Pumpkins, so they recruited a new drummer, Steven Gillis.

Despite many complications and an extended four-year wait between albums, the band managed to find success once again, as the follow-up, Title of Record, went platinum, largely off of the success of the band's single "Take a Picture". The band, feeling pressure from the record label to maintain this momentum, and without any of the hurdles that prevented progress in the last album cycle, commenced work on a third album.

== Writing and themes ==
Inspiration and influences for the creation process was largely influenced by three main factors. The first was a 2 month cross-country road trip Patrick took prior to recording. Patrick found himself disgusted with the commercialization and homogenization of American culture, stating that he found himself "sick and tired of seeing McDonald's, Burger King, Subway, on every single street." The reaction even led to the naming of the album; with The Amalgamut being a neologism of a portmanteau of "amalgam" and "gamut", with Patrick feeling that ultimately there should be "more focus on abstract thought and individualism, as opposed to everybody trying to be the same." Conversely, Patrick stated the album title had more positive connotations as well, with Patrick stating that he saw, through interacting with actual people, that America was, in fact, a melting pot of different races and origins, and that the term Amalgamut was also "a celebration of freedom".

Secondly, Patrick was influenced by worldly issues, especially violence, towards the turn of the century. "The Missing", while technically written prior to the 9/11 Attacks, became all the more meaningful to Patrick after said events, as it captured many of his emotions and reactions to it. The track "Columind" was written in response to the Columbine High School massacre, whereas "American Cliché" was more of a response to "how commonplace school violence has become".

The Amalgamut was more insane because I was really, really pushing the envelope. It was the most Hunter S. Thompson four years of my life. It was fear and loathing in Chicago for four years. I hit bottom in '98 and scraped bottom from 1998 until 2002. In 1998 I was staying up for three or four days at a time. I was just crazy, crazy, crazy—totally pushing the envelope of human addiction. And succeeding.

— Richard Patrick on his drug use during the Amalgamut sessions.

Thirdly, the writing sessions were affected by Patrick's struggles with addiction, concerning alcohol, cigarettes, and drugs. While Patrick had struggled with it in the past, it became particularly bad upon dealing with the pressure of recording a follow-up to the platinum selling Title of Record. Patrick would stay up for multiple days at a time without sleep, spending entire days indulging in his addictions instead of working on the album. The album's first single, "Where Do We Go From Here" addressed said struggles; the track was self-referential in Patrick's struggles to create the album in the face of his addiction, knowing that the money being spent in the prolonged period, and the drugs being taken, were not sustainable activities. The track "God Damn Me" was written in between Patrick's blackouts one night when he was so heavily intoxictated that a friend kept on stopping in to wake him up to make sure he was still alive. In 2013, Patrick would reflect on the writing sessions, stating

"I went through a music phase where I was writing as I experienced my life within drugs and alcohol....I cringe when I hear some of it because a lot of the lyrics I feel like ugh what was I thinking. There's a lot of stuff I would have changed if I had been a little bit more clear headed."

== Recording and production ==
The recording sessions were prolonged and extensive due to many complications, many stemming from Patrick's struggle's with addiction. Patrick recalled "almost being in tears" after recording vocals for the track "Where Do We Go From Here", as he was typically smoking three to four packs of cigarettes a day, making it difficult for him to hit his higher notes, and even breathe at times. Delays also occurred upon Patrick breaking his wrist after completing a new song, celebrating it, and then slipping and falling on the ice while refusing to go to the hospital. Patrick was still able to play guitar, though his movements were limited. Patrick also would lash out at others, ranging from insulting members of the band's official messageboard for posts he didn't approve of, leading to its ultimate removal, and temporarily kicking band members out of the studio to work on music alone. As such, progress was continually delayed; with Patrick's timetable for a release date shifting from June 2001, to July 2001, to early 2002, to "mid to late summer".

In recording the album, the band worked with music producers Ben Grosse and Rae DiLeo, both of which they had worked with on Title of Record. Patrick aimed to make the album "more metallic and mainstream" than Title of Record, but also wrote several songs using acoustic guitar. The heavier songs were recorded in "drop A" and "drop D" guitar tunings. The band entered the final phases of recording the album in December 2001, with plans to start mixing the album at the beginning of 2002. In March 2002, the band released a tentative track list that ultimately containing all of the tracks that would be make the final album, albeit with an alternate order, and "The 4th" going by the tentative title "Reservation". Other tentative names for tracks during the recording process included "I Like the World Today" for the track "World Today" and "It Feels Like You're With Me and Against Me" for "The Only Way (Is the Wrong Way)". The album entered the mixing stage, done by Grosse, and mastering phase, done by Bob Ludwig in April 2002, and was fully completed by the end of the month, after 18 months of recording, but pushed back to mid-2002 by the record label.

=== Unreleased material ===
Patrick has alluded to several songs that were not released on the album's final release. In January 2001, he alluded to the song title "It Will Always Remain In My Head". In October 2001, Patrick alluded to a song by the title "Don't Give an Inch", which he described as sounding similar to past Filter tracks "Stuck in Here" and "Take a Picture". He stated the track's lyrics were about not being afraid of who he was, and "kind of a message to all people to focus on being an individual, and less on being a spoke in a wheel." In 2010, Patrick revealed that the track "Drug Boy", off of their 2010 release The Trouble With Angels, had actually been written in the Amalgamut sessions.

== Release, promotion, and aftermath ==
After some minor shuffling around with the release date from August 6, to July 23, to July 30, The Amalgamut was finally released on July 30, 2002. The album's release was preceded by the first single, "Where Do We Go from Here", released on June 20. The album saw initial success, with the album charting at no. 32 on the Billboard 200 charts, only two place below their prior album, Title of Record. Additionally, "Where Do We Go From Here" charted on several music charts, including no. 11 on the Hot Modern Rock Tracks, no. 12 on the Hot Mainstream Rock Tracks, and no. 94 on the all-format Billboard Hot 100 chart. Prior to touring in support of the album, Patrick and Lenardo recruited a second guitarist, Alan Bailey, as a live member, to fully flesh out the band's sound for live shows. The band played live shows promoting the album in the five weeks leading up to the album's release. However, shortly after, the band would lose momentum. The band was able to perform a handful of headlining concerts around the time of the album's release, and made an appearance on Late Night with Conan O'Brien, to play the track "My Long Walk to Jail", but on the eve of September 30, just before starting up a major tour to promote the album, Patrick cancelled all tour dates in order to enter drug rehabilitation. Additionally, prior to entering, Patrick indicated that music piracy may have hurt the album's sales, with him stating that figures showed that the album had been downloaded illegally at least 80,000 times in its first month, which is more than the album's official sales, which only amounted to 76,000 copies sold in the same timeframe. A second single, "American Cliché", was later released, but failed to leave much of a mark, only charting at no. 40 on the Mainstream Rock chart. The track appeared on the game ATV Offroad Fury 2. The song "The Only Way (Is the Wrong Way)" was later licensed for use in a Hummer commercial, something Patrick later remarked was used to help finance his rehab. The track was later released on the Tomb Raider: Cradle of Life film soundtrack as well.

While Patrick's initial announcement was that he hoped the touring would resume in 2003, these plans never surfaced. With band members gone and pressure from the record label, he forwent his touring plans in lieu of entering the recording studio to record another album. Patrick enlisted the help of Stone Temple Pilots members Robert DeLeo and Dean DeLeo to work on the album, but upon their writing and jam sessions, Patrick opted to start a new band with them instead, called Army of Anyone. This pushed off any further activity from Filter until 2008, when Patrick recorded and released a follow-up called Anthems for the Damned, largely by himself but with some from guest appearances and drummer Josh Freese.

== Critical reception ==
Professional ratings
Aggregate scores
Source	Rating
Metacritic	68/100
Review scores
Source	Rating
AllMusic	3.5/5 stars
Alternative Press	3.5/5 stars
Blender	3/5 stars
Entertainment Weekly	B+
Melodic	4/5 stars
Now	5/5
Q	3/5 stars
Rolling Stone	3/5 stars
Spin	6/10

The album has commonly been considered a critical and commercial flop, although review aggregator Metacritic assigned the album a score of 68 out of 100, based on eight reviews, indicating "generally favorable reviews". Allmusic critic Don Kline praised the album for offering "the album cleverly incorporates the best of what Short Bus and Title of Record each had to offer", and ultimately concluded that "the resulting sound is that of an updated and improved Filter, with The Amalgamut proving that there's much more to the band than "Hey Man, Nice Shot." Ben Mitchell of Blender thought that the record adheres to the blueprint laid down by the breakthrough power ballad "Take a Picture", while also featuring heavier tracks. Mitchell further wrote: "The ballads are for dough, and damned catchy they are, too." Entertainment Weekly's Robert Cherry, who remarked the mixture of "skyscraping melodies, tonsil-shredding screams, electronic textures, and acoustic and metal guitars", stated: "Richard Patrick's unfocused lyrics don't offer much insight into the album's reported subject: America's cultural diversity. But the music is more honed than ever."

Matt Ashare of Spin thought that the best tracks on The Amalgamut "sweep ringing, acoustic-guitar verses into anthemic power-chord choruses", while concluding that "the only tradition Filter answers to is that of consummate rock professionalism." In a negative review, Andrew Shaffer of The Huffington Post criticized the album for being "a mess mirroring Patrick's own downward spiral into drug and alcohol abuse." Rolling Stone critic Barry Walters criticized the heavier tracks of The Amalgamut for weighing the record down; nevertheless, Walters praised the "standout" track "The Only Way (Is the Wrong Way)", further stating: "If Filter can repeatedly attain such pure beauty, why can't they elsewhere filter out their own sludge?"

== Track listing ==
No.	Title	Writer(s)	Length
1.	"You Walk Away"	Richard Patrick, Geno Lenardo	4:36
2.	"American Cliché"	Patrick	3:37
3.	"Where Do We Go from Here"	Patrick, Lenardo	5:34
4.	"Columind"	Patrick	3:36
5.	"The Missing"	Patrick	4:46
6.	"The Only Way (Is the Wrong Way)"	Patrick, Lenardo	5:13
7.	"My Long Walk to Jail"	Patrick, Lenardo	4:07
8.	"So I Quit"	Patrick, Lenardo, Frank Cavanagh, Steve Gillis	3:23
9.	"God Damn Me"	Patrick	4:15
10.	"It Can Never Be the Same"	Patrick, Lenardo, Cavanagh, Gillis	4:32
11.	"World Today"	Patrick, Rae DiLeo	5:50
12.	"The 4th"	Patrick, DiLeo	8:07

20th anniversary Expanded edition bonus digital tracks
No.	Title	Writer(s)	Length
13.	"Where Do We Go from Here" (X-ecutioner's remix)	Patrick, Lenardo	4:37
14.	"Where Do We Go from Here" (Richard Vission's Vocal Ejection Mix)	Patrick, Lenardo	5:43
15.	"Where Do We Go from Here" (Richard Vission's Pink Noise Vocal Mix)	Patrick, Lenardo	8:17
16.	"Where Do We Go from Here" (DJ Hyper Mix)	Patrick, Lenardo	7:11
17.	"Where Do We Go from Here" (X-ecutioner's Bonus Beats)	Patrick, Lenardo	4:35
18.	"Where Do We Go from Here" (Richard Vission's Dub Injection Mix)	Patrick, Lenardo	5:20
19.	"Where Do We Go from Here" (Richard Morel's Pink Noise Dub)	Patrick, Lenardo	7:06
20.	"Where Do We Go from Here" (DJ Hyper Dub)	Patrick, Lenardo	7:11
21.	"Where Do We Go from Here" (Single Edit)	Patrick, Lenardo	4:02

== Personnel ==
Credits per AllMusic, unless otherwise sourced.

Band

- Richard Patrick – lead vocals, guitar, programming, drum loop on "World Today"
- Geno Lenardo – guitar, bass guitar, programming
- Frank Cavanaugh – bass
- Steven Gillis – drums

Production

- Ben Grosse – production, engineer, mix engineer
- Rae DiLeo – production, engineer, digital editing
- Jeff Mol – assistant engineer
- Darrell Thorp – assistant engineer
- Chuck Bailey – assistant engineer
- Rick Behrens – assistant engineer
- Blumpy – digital editing
- Bob Ludwig – mastering

== Charts ==
=== Weekly charts ===
Weekly chart performance for The Amalgamut
Charts (2002)	Peak position
Australian Albums (ARIA)	43
Austrian Albums (Ö3 Austria)	12
German Albums (Offizielle Top 100)	17
Scottish Albums (Official Charts)	66
Swiss Albums (Schweizer Hitparade)	78
UK Albums (Official Charts)	68
UK Rock & Metal Albums (Official Charts)	9
US Billboard 200	32

=== Year-end charts ===
Year-end chart performance for The Amalgamut
Chart (2002)	Position
Canadian Alternative Albums (Nielsen SoundScan)	160
Canadian Metal Albums (Nielsen SoundScan)	80
