= The Algorithm (Filter album) =

Studio album by Filter
- Released: August 25, 2023
- Recorded: 2018–2022
- Genre: Industrial rock; alternative rock; hard rock
- Length: 43:39
- Label: Golden Robot
- Producer: Richard Patrick; Brian Virtue

Filter chronology
Crazy Eyes (2016)	The Algorithm (2023)

Singles from The Algorithm
- 1. "For the Beaten" Released: October 13, 2022; 2. "Face Down" Released: May 5, 2023; 3. "Obliteration" Released: July 11, 2023

Professional ratings
Review scores
Source	Rating
AllMusic	4/5 stars
New Noise	4/5 stars
Sputnikmusic	3.5/5

The Algorithm is the eighth studio album by American rock band Filter. It was released on August 25, 2023. Originally conceived in 2018 as a follow-up to the band's first album, Short Bus (1995), titled Rebus, the project changed course due to the collapse of the PledgeMusic crowd funding platform. Despite this, some material from the sessions still appears in the final release, while two other tracks were released in 2020 as singles. The Algorithm is the band's first album in seven years since Crazy Eyes (2016). The Algorithm album cover and package artwork was created by British artist Sam Shearon a.k.a: 'Mister Sam Shearon'

== Background and recording ==
After releasing their seventh studio album, Crazy Eyes (2016), and touring in support of it in 2017, frontman Richard Patrick turned to making new music in 2018. The start of the project was spurred by a particular event; Patrick was attending a Veruca Salt concert which also was being attended by original Filter member Brian Liesegang, who had left the band shortly after the release of their first album, the platinum selling Short Bus (1995), due to creative differences with Patrick. Knowing both were there, Veruca Salt member Louise Post stopped mid-concert to call both out, stating that they need to "bury any bullshit, forget the crap, and get their shit together" in regards to making new music together. The two took the message to heart, and decided to work on a new album together. By October 2018, they had announced the concept; the two decided on calling the album Rebus—an allusion to the only Filter album the two had worked together on—and centered the album's conception around the idea of recording a follow-up to that album, but with more modern sounds and concepts.

The band had planned to procure funding for the album creation process through crowd sourcing platform PledgeMusic. However, the band had gone quiet on the progress of the project through the mid-part of 2019, until July 2019, when Patrick announced that the collaboration with Liesegang had been cancelled due to the bankruptcy of the PledgeMusic company and "a variety of other reasons". He announced that the scope of the album would be changing - Liesegang would not be working on the album moving forward, and that it had changed names to They've Got Us Right Where They Want Us, at Each Other's Throats. Despite this, Patrick noted that he still hoped to include three of the songs that he had written with Liesegang on the album, titled "Murica", "Thoughts and Prayers", and "(Command-Z) High as a Muv Fucka".

Patrick once again went silent on the project until the release of the single "Thoughts and Prayers" in June 2020, where he announced it had been retitled again, to Murica, and that it was scheduled for release by the end of 2020. On October 29, the title track was released as a single along with its music video and album cover art. The video depicts Patrick as a far right wing Republican party supporter, causing tension among the band's fan base.

In 2022, Patrick announced in interviews on his Facebook page that he had changed the name back to They've Got Us Right Where They Want Us, at Each Other's Throats, that the album was now scheduled for a 2023 release on Golden Robot Records, and the two singles released in 2020 would not be on the album. In October 2022, the single "For the Beaten" was released, which Patrick now described as the album's first single.

May 5, 2023 saw the release of the second single, "Face Down", along with a reveal of the album's title.

A new single, "All The Good" was released to streaming platforms on July 11, 2025 to promote The Algorithm: Ultra Edition, a remastered version of The Algorithm with bonus material available August 8, 2025.

== Track listing ==
The Algorithm track listing
No.	Title	Writer(s)	Length
1.	"The Drowning"	Richard Patrick	3:50
2.	"Up Against the Wall"	Patrick; Zach Munowitz	4:55
3.	"For the Beaten"	Patrick; Munowitz	3:38
4.	"Obliteration"	Patrick; Sam Tinnesz; Ian Scott; Mark Jackson	3:37
5.	"Say It Again"	Patrick; Munowitz	3:53
6.	"Face Down"	Patrick	3:39
7.	"Summer Child"	Patrick; Brian Liesegang	3:42
8.	"Threshing Floor"	Patrick; Tinnesz; Seth Mosley	4:05
9.	"Be Careful What You Wish For"	Patrick	4:08
10.	"Burn Out the Sun"	Patrick; Tinnesz	3:54
11.	"Command Z"	Patrick; Liesegang	4:18
Total length:			43:39

The Algorithm (Ultra Edition) track listing
No.	Title	Writer(s)	Length
1.	"All The Good"	Patrick; Munowitz	3:13
2.	"A Sort of Homecoming"	Adam Clayton; Dave Evans; Larry Mullen Jr.; Paul Hewson	5:41
3.	"The Drowning"	Patrick	3:50
4.	"Up Against the Wall"	Patrick; Munowitz	4:55
5.	"For the Beaten"	Patrick; Munowitz	3:38
6.	"Obliteration"	Patrick; Tinnesz; Scott; Jackson	3:37
7.	"Say It Again"	Patrick; Munowitz	3:53
8.	"Face Down"	Patrick	3:39
9.	"Summer Child"	Patrick; Liesegang	3:42
10.	"Threshing Floor"	Patrick; Tinnesz; Mosley	4:05
11.	"Be Careful What You Wish For"	Patrick	4:08
12.	"Burn Out the Sun"	Patrick	3:54
13.	"Command Z"	Patrick; Liesegang	4:18
14.	"Burn Out the Sun - Julian Gray Remix"	Patrick; Tinnesz	3:43
15.	"Obliteration - Sean Beaven Remix"	Patrick; Tinnesz; Scott; Jackson	4:13
16.	"Obliteration - Charlie Clouser Remix"	Patrick; Tinnesz; Scott; Jackson	6:52
17.	"Obliteration - Richard Patrick Remix"	Patrick; Tinnesz; Scott; Jackson	5:09
18.	"Murica"	Patrick; Liesegang	3:58
19.	"Thoughts and Prayers"	Patrick	4:29
20.	"Bad Guy"	Billie Eilish; Finneas O'Connell	3:19
Total length:			84:16

== Personnel ==
Filter

- Richard Patrick – lead vocals, guitars, bass, programming
- Jonny Radtke – guitars, backing vocals
- Bobby Miller – bass, backing vocals
- Elias Mallin – drums

Additional personnel

- Zach Munowitz – guitars on "For the Beaten", "Up Against the Wall", and "Say It Again"
- Sam Tinnesz – guitars on "Obliteration" and "Burn Out the Sun"
- Mark Jackson – guitars on "Obliteration"
- Brian Liesegang – programming on "Command Z"
- Ray Luzier – drums on "Summer Child"
- Seth Mosley – production on "Threshing Floor"
- Brian Virtue – mixing, production
- Howie Weinberg – mastering

== Charts ==
Chart performance for The Algorithm
Chart (2023)	Peak position
UK Rock & Metal Albums (OCC)	20
