= Dualesc =

Rock band

- Origin: Portland, Oregon, U.S.
- Genres: Alternative rock, emo
- Years active: 1998–2006
- Label: Rise
- Past members: Matt McMillan; Bryon Deisher; Marshall Tipton; Rob Hillis; Adam Hubka; Tim Steiner

Dualesc was an American four-piece rock band from Portland, Oregon, United States. The band was active from 1998 to 2006.

== Biography ==
Dualesc formed in 1998, composed of singer Matt McMillan, guitarist Bryon Deisher and bassist Adam Hubka. Their original drummer, Tim Steiner, left in 1999 and was replaced by Marshall Tipton shortly thereafter. The band went through a couple early band names before eventually settling on Dualesc, a word the band created that was inspired by the idea of Cartesian Dualism. Dualesc recorded their first CD Oscillations in 2000. The disc eventually got into the hands of Richard Patrick from the band Filter. Patrick invited them to Chicago to record at his Abyssinian Sons Studios. Produced by Richard Patrick and Rae Dileo, Dualesc recorded an EP in early 2001 at the studio. Patrick liked the band so much that he played guitar on the song "Belief".

In early 2002, Dualesc was signed to Rise Records. They re-mastered the Richard Patrick EP and included six new songs for what would be their album titled Through the Floods, Not With Them.

Dualesc independently recorded and released their third release, titled Palisade Layer, in 2003. It included six new songs and a re-recording of an older song from Oscillations featuring a guest appearance from Chris Ruff of Kaddisfly on the song "I Don't Even Know You."

In 2004, Dualesc's bassist Adam Hubka left the band and was replaced by Rob Hillis. The new lineup spent the summer of 2004 in the studio working on their final album titled Lhasa the Birdcatcher, which remained unfinished and unreleased officially until 2025.

Dualesc played a handful of shows in Portland during 2004 and 2005 before eventually fading into hiatus sometime around 2006.

In late 2025, Crimson Solitude Records partnered with Dualesc to release a remastered edition of the previously unfinished Lhasa the Birdcatcher for its 20th anniversary.

== Discography ==
- Oscillations (2000)
- Saltbase Solutions (2001)
- Through the Floods, Not With Them (2002)
- Palisade Layer (2003)
- Lhasa the Birdcatcher (Remastered) (2025)

== Compilation album ==
- Rise Records 2004 Sampler (2004)

== Videos and audio recordings ==
There are a handful of live concert videos from the band's 2004 US Tour that can be found online.

== Band members ==
- Matt McMillan - vocals (1998–2006)
- Bryon Deisher - guitar (1998–2006)
- Marshall Tipton - drums (1999–2006)
- Rob Hillis - bass (2004–2006)
- Adam Hubka - bass (1998–2004)
- Tim Steiner - drums (1998)
