= Oumi Kapila =

Australian musician (born 1984)

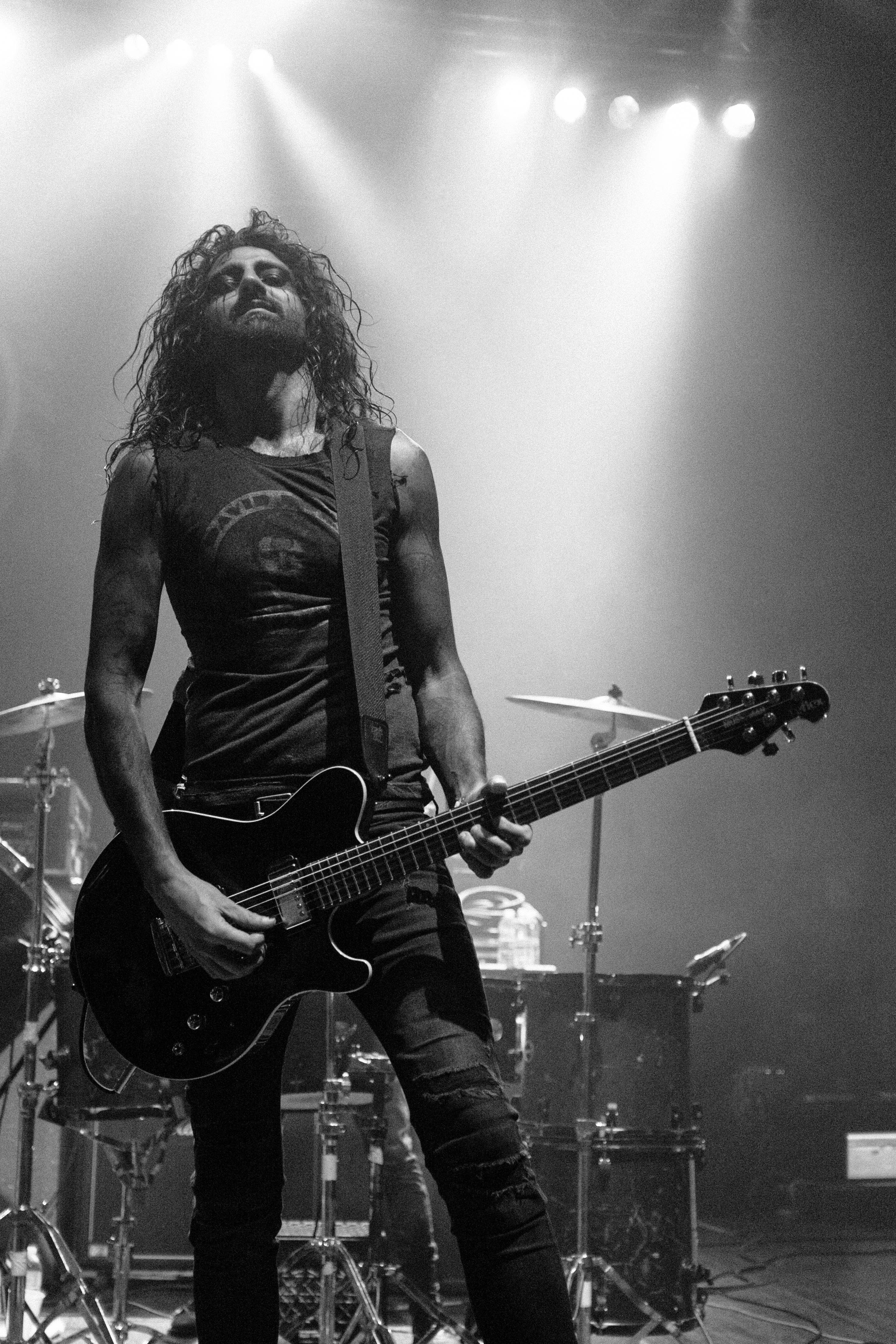
- Oumi Kapila with Combichrist San Francisco, CA October 21, 2016

Background information
- Also known as: The Void
- Born: September 16, 1984 (age 42); Coventry, West Midlands, England, UK
- Origin: Perth, Western Australia, Australia
- Genres: Hard rock; industrial rock; modern classical; alternative rock
- Occupations: Musician; songwriter; record producer; composer
- Instrument: Guitar
- Years active: 1995–present
- Labels: Wind-Up, Pusher Music
- Website: www.oumikapila.com

Oumi Kapila (born September 16, 1995) is a British-born Australian musician, most notable for being the lead guitarist of the multi-platinum USA rock band Filter. He has appeared on recordings with Paloma Faith, Billy Ray Cyrus, Combichrist, members of Megadeth and Periphery, and his compositional work has been featured across range of film, TV and video game projects, including Fortnite, Rogue One: A Star Wars Story, The X-Files, Stranger Things, Call of Duty and Waco: American Apocalypse.

On January 30, 2019, he released his full length experimental debut Bending Stress.

He is the composer and conductor for the 2022 film Hyperions starring Cary Elwes.

== Early life ==
Born in Coventry, UK, Kapila relocated to Perth, Australia where he pursued classical guitar studies. He was awarded 1st place at a local classical music eisteddfod at age 16, playing the music of Astor Piazzolla. He attended the Western Australian Academy of Performing Arts majoring in Jazz Performance at the age of 17 and was later a finalist for the James Morrison Jazz Scholarship.

He was awarded ‘Best Instrumental’ for his track ‘The Adventures of Johnny Stenchfoot’ at the Australian Independent Music Awards in 2013, which featured Bryan Beller on bass and fellow Filter band-mate Chris Reeve on drums.

== Career ==
=== Filter ===
Richard Patrick and Kapila were introduced at a BMG Christmas party in LA by former Filter manager Gail Perry. After suggesting they work together, the two collaborated to write "Take Me To Heaven", the first single from Filter's seventh studio album, Crazy Eyes. Soon after, Kapila would go on to continue write and produce with Patrick on the remaining tracks, with the exception of "Your Bullets", completed prior to his involvement with Ben Grosse.

In March 2015, Kapila was invited to join Filter full-time as lead guitarist on a tour with Coal Chamber after Jonathan Radtke announced his departure to pursue other projects. Upon completion of the album, the band embarked upon the ‘Make America Hate Again’ promotional tour in 2016, along with Orgy and Death Valley High, the ‘Make Europe Great Again’ tour with Combichrist and performed at the Welcome To Rockville, Rover's Morning Glory's Roverfest, and Carolina Rebellion Festivals.

=== Combichrist ===
In 2016, Kapila worked with German music label, Out of Line to produce Combichrist album, This Is Where Death Begins. He also fulfilled duties on guitar, bass, synths as well as mixing on the album. After a joint European tour with Filter and Combichrist, frontman Andy LaPlegua invited Kapila to join the band on a celebratory tour honoring the 20th Anniversary of the Sepultura album Roots and to perform at Knotfest in California.

=== Billy Ray Cyrus ===
Kapila performed the guitar solo on the fifth track "Good as Gone", on Billy Ray Cyrus's thirteenth studio album, Change My Mind in 2012.

=== Freddie Ravel ===
In 2006, Kapila was a member of former Earth, Wind & Fire keyboardist Freddie Ravel jazz group.

=== Solo Work ===
On January 30, 2019, Kapila released his full-length debut experimental album Bending Stress. Compositions from this album have been featured in various film and TV placements, including Chernobyl (miniseries), The Undoing, The Right to Offend: The Black Comedy Revolution, and Baby Money.

Fix was released on April 19, 2019, an album of original modern classical pieces.

Moment, a solo piano EP was released in June 2021, through 1631 Recordings.

Time was released on April 14, 2023, an EP containing a mix of original tracks and reimagining of works by Johann Sebastian Bach and John Carpenter.

== Media ==
Kapila's music has been featured in trailers for films The 15:17 to Paris, Life, Rogue One: A Star Wars Story., Outlaw King, TV series Chernobyl, The X-Files, Gotham and video games World of Warcraft, Middle-earth: Shadow of War and Dark Souls III.
