= Welcome to the Fold =

1999 single by Filter

Single by Filter

from the album Title of Record
- Released: August 10, 1999
- Genre: Alternative metal; nu metal; industrial rock; alternative rock
- Length: 7:41 (album version); 4:42 (radio edit)
- Label: Reprise
- Songwriter: Richard Patrick
- Producers: Ben Grosse; Richard Patrick; Rae DiLeo

Filter singles chronology
"One" (1998)	"Welcome to the Fold" (1999)	"Take a Picture" (2000)

"Welcome to the Fold" is a song by American rock band Filter, released in August 1999 as the lead single from their second studio album, Title of Record. The song was included on Spin's list of "The 69 Best Alternative Rock Songs of 1999."

== Background ==
The title of the song is based on an album of the same name released in 1998 by a novelty folk-rock band from Cleveland called 100,000 Leagues Under My Nutsack. Filter's bassist, Frank Cavanagh, was friends with 100,000 Leagues' lead singer, and Richard Patrick liked the album so much that he named the song after it.

In 1999, singer Richard Patrick said, "'Welcome to the Fold' is based on being a crazed lunatic. That's what being a mid-20's decadent bachelor is all about. Not giving a flying fuck. I got money. I got a platinum record. I got a band. I've got everything I want and I don't give a flying fuck what I do." Patrick also described it as his favorite song on the album, and said "it's a 10-minute song with three songs in it."

While the song's verses are screamed and the guitar riff is grinding and abrasive, the chorus is more sedate and chord-driven. Patrick described the milder chorus as "the party at the end of the night. The weekend. The celebration of just the fact that we're doing OK, we feel OK."

== Music video ==
The song's music video (directed by Peter Christopherson) begins with an RV driving through a desert, and a man comes out spotting a giant clear cube, in which the band is performing the song inside of. A man comes out and calls on his radio and soon more people in RVs come and set up camp to watch the concert. During the guitar solo, several of the campers jump inside the cube and do some crowd surfing. At the end of the video, the cube floats up in the air and explodes.

== Track listings ==
US 12-inch single

Side A
No.	Title	Length
1.	"Welcome to the Fold" (album version)	7:41
2.	"Welcome to the Fold" (Freq Nasty remix)	7:02

Side B
No.	Title	Length
1.	"Welcome to the Fold" (Moving Fusion remix)	6:46

US maxi-CD single and UK CD1

No.	Title	Length
1.	"Welcome to the Fold" (clean radio edit)	4:42
2.	"One" (Harry Nilsson cover)	4:07
3.	"(Can't You) Trip Like I Do" (featuring The Crystal Method)	4:26

UK CD2

No.	Title	Length
1.	"Welcome to the Fold" (radio edit)	4:42
2.	"Welcome to the Fold" (Freq Nasty remix)	6:59
3.	"Welcome to the Fold" (Moving Fusion remix)	6:46
4.	"Welcome to the Fold" (music video)	4:51

Australian maxi-CD single

No.	Title	Length
1.	"Welcome to the Fold" (radio edit)	4:42
2.	"One" (Harry Nilsson cover)	4:07
3.	"Welcome to the Fold" (Freq Nasty remix)	7:02
4.	"Welcome to the Fold" (Moving Fusion remix)	6:46

== Personnel ==
Filter

- Richard Patrick – vocals, guitar, programming
- Geno Lenardo – guitar, programming
- Frank Cavanagh – bass
- Steven Gillis – drums

Additional musicians

- Jim McGrath – percussion

== Charts ==
=== Weekly charts ===
Chart (1999)	Peak position
New Zealand (Recorded Music NZ)	42
Scottish Singles Sales (Official Charts)	99
UK Singles (Official Charts)	81
US Alternative Airplay (Billboard)	17
US Mainstream Rock (Billboard)	8

=== Year-end charts ===
Chart (1999)	Position
US Mainstream Rock Tracks (Billboard)	52
US Modern Rock Tracks (Billboard)	77

== Release history ==
Region	Date	Format(s)	Label(s)	Ref.
United States	July 1999	Active rock; modern rock; college radio	Reprise	
United States	August 10, 1999	12-inch vinyl	Reprise	
Canada	September 21, 1999	CD	Reprise	
United Kingdom	September 27, 1999	CD	Reprise	
