= The Crow: City of Angels (soundtrack) =

Soundtrack album by various artists
- Released: July 30, 1996
- Genres: Alternative rock, heavy metal, industrial rock, gothic rock, hip hop
- Length: 78:38
- Label: Hollywood

Professional ratings
Review scores
Source	Rating
AllMusic	3/5 stars
Sputnikmusic	2/5 stars

Chart positions
Year	Chart	Position
1996	US Billboard 200	8

The original soundtrack of The Crow: City of Angels, the sequel to the 1994 film The Crow, was released on July 30, 1996, by Hollywood Records. The album includes a cover of the Fleetwood Mac song "Gold Dust Woman" by Hole, as well as tracks by other heavyweight artists such as White Zombie, Korn, Deftones and Iggy Pop. Like the original Crow soundtrack, a song by Joy Division (one of O'Barr's favorite bands) is covered, "In a Lonely Place" by Bush.

Initial pressings contained a small Crow comic in the CD booklet, written by John Wagner and illustrated by Dean Ormston.

Hole, Filter, Tricky and Rob Zombie all returned for the soundtrack of The Crow: Salvation.

According to RIAA, the album has been certified Platinum with sales exceeding 1 million copies in the United States. The album was reportedly banned in Korea and Singapore.

== Track listing ==
No.	Title	Writer(s)	Producer(s)	Length
1.	"Gold Dust Woman" (Hole)	Stevie Nicks	Ric Ocasek	5:07
2.	"I'm Your Boogie Man" (White Zombie)	Harry Wayne Casey; Richard Finch	Terry Date; Ulrich Wild; White Zombie	4:27
3.	"Jurassitol" (Filter)	Richard Patrick; Brian Liesegang	Filter	5:13
4.	"Naked Cousin" (PJ Harvey)	Polly Jean Harvey	Flood; Polly Jean Harvey; John Parish	3:56
5.	"In a Lonely Place" (Bush)	Ian Curtis; Peter Hook; Stephen Morris; Bernard Sumner	Tricky	5:58
6.	"Tonite Is a Special Nite (Kaos Mass Confusion Mix)" (Tricky vs. The Gravediggaz)	Tricky; Anthony Campbell; Robert Diggs	Tricky; Dobie; The Gravediggaz	4:41
7.	"Shelf Life" (Seven Mary Three)	Jason Ross; Jason Pollock	Jason Ross; Jason Pollock; Tom Morris	4:30
8.	"Knock Me Out" (Linda Perry featuring Grace Slick)	Linda Perry; Marty Willson-Piper; Grace Slick	Bill Bottrell	6:48
9.	"Paper Dress" (Toadies)	Vaden Todd Lewis^{[a]}^{[b]}; Darrel Herbert^{[a]}	Paul Leary	4:44
10.	"Spit" (NY Loose)	Brijitte West	Julian Raymond; Phil Kaffel; NY Loose	5:52
11.	"Sean Olson" (Korn)	Brian Welch; Jonathan Davis; David Silveria; James Shaffer; Reginald Arvizu	Ross Robinson	4:46
12.	"Teething" (Deftones)	Stephen Carpenter; Chi Cheng; Abe Cunningham; Camillo Moreno	Matt Wallace	3:33
13.	"I Wanna Be Your Dog" (live at Rock for Choice 1995) (Iggy Pop)	James Osterberg; Dave Alexander; Ron Asheton; Scott Asheton	Thom Wilson; Iggy Pop	4:40
14.	"Lil' Boots" (Pet)	Lisa Papineau; Tyler Bates	Tyler Bates	4:08
15.	"City of Angels" (Above the Law featuring Frost)	Frost; Gilbert RueDaFlores; Julio Gonzalez; Tony Gonzalez; Kevin Gully; Cold 187um	Tony G; Julio G	4:52
16.	"Believe in Angels" (Heather Nova and Graeme Revell)	Graeme Revell; Heather Nova	Graeme Revell	5:23
Total length:				78:38

Notes

- ^{^[a]} signifies a music composer
- ^{^[b]} signifies a lyricist

== Certifications ==
Region	Certification	Certified units/sales
Canada (Music Canada)	Gold	50,000^{^}
United States (RIAA)	Platinum	1,000,000^{^}
^{^} Shipments figures based on certification alone.
