= Crazy Eyes (Filter album) =

Studio album by Filter
- Released: April 8, 2016
- Recorded: 2014–2015
- Studio: Studio 11:11, NRG Recording Studios, The Mix Room
- Genre: Industrial rock
- Length: 50:35
- Label: Wind-Up
- Producer: Richard Patrick

Filter chronology
The Sun Comes Out Tonight (2013)	Crazy Eyes (2016)	The Algorithm (2023)

Singles from Crazy Eyes
- 1. "Take Me to Heaven" Released: January 2016

Crazy Eyes is the seventh studio album by American rock band Filter. The album was released on April 8, 2016. The first single, "Take Me to Heaven", was released in January 2016. In its opening week, the album debuted at number 151 on the Billboard 200 charts, the band's lowest debut to date.

== Background ==
Similar to several other Filter albums, prior to recording, the band received an entire lineup change besides frontman and band founder Richard Patrick. New members recruited included guitarist Oumi Kapila, bassist Ashley Dzerigian, drummer Chris Reeve and keyboardist Bobby Miller.

== Composition and themes ==
The album marked a change in sound from prior Filter albums, moving into a direction Patrick coined as "new industrial". He described it as "...more experimental and crazy...scary, weird places instead of doing that big-ass guitar sound again." Billboard described it as "...hardly bereft of guitars but there are a substantial amount of electronics and effects in use. The result features heavy industrial crunch and solemn, ambient songs that reach back to Patrick's time in Nine Inch Nails and the first Filter album, 1995's Short Bus".

Thematically, the album still keeps with the band's themes of frustration and anger. Additionally, Patrick described it as an attempt "to look at people's unexplainable behavior and assess it, using sound. It's a way to approximate the insanity of the human condition." The track "Take Me to Heaven" was written by Patrick's struggle with dealing with the death of his father. Patrick recalled:

I was looking into the eyes of my father when he was passing away, and I held his hand...He glanced at me really quickly, focused on me, had this look of gratitude, and then he slipped away. I was almost like, 'I hope you're going to heaven'. Scientifically, the idea doesn't make any sense to me, but if there is a heaven, take me there.

The track "Nothing in My Hands" was written about the Ferguson and Michael Brown shootings.

== Promotion and release ==
The album's first single, "Take Me to Heaven", was first premiered on the Billboard website in January 2016. The album is scheduled for release on April 8, 2016, through Wind-Up Records. Two days before release, Billboard put up the entire album for streaming. 'Crazy Eyes' debuted at number 151 on the Billboard 200, selling 5,000 copies in its first week.

== Reception ==
Professional ratings
Review scores
Source	Rating
AllMusic	3.5/5 stars
AntiHero Magazine	10/10
Renowned for Sound	3.5/5 stars
Sputnikmusic	4/5 stars

The album was generally well received. AllMusic praised the album for being something new while still being familiar to Patrick's past with Filter and Nine Inch Nails, describing it as "Less politically on the nose than the poppy Anthems for the Damned, more mature than the easy retread of The Trouble with Angels, and more visceral than The Sun Comes Out Tonight" and ultimately that "Crazy Eyes manages to tread new ground for Filter while respectfully acknowledging the sound that propelled the band in the first place. The Sputnik Music staff review echoes these sentiments, stating that the album was better than Filter's last few albums, but that "though harder to digest on a first listen, these songs gradually get under your skin, revealing one of Filter's greatest LPs to date." Renowned for Sound was less positive about the album, criticizing Patrick's rough vocals and concluding that "Patrick tries to cover too much ground on one record, creating the feeling of a collection of songs instead of the feeling of an album. Had Crazy Eyes featured a unity of purpose, the great songs on the record could have been extended to making a great album.

== Track listing ==
No.	Title	Writer(s)	Length
1.	"Mother E"	Richard Patrick, Oumi Kapila	3:54
2.	"Nothing in My Hands"	Patrick, Ben Grosse, Jonathan Radtke, Michael Tuller	4:34
3.	"Pride Flag"	Patrick, Kapila	3:48
4.	"The City of Blinding Riots"	Patrick, Danny Lohner	4:16
5.	"Take Me to Heaven"	Patrick, Kapila	3:37
6.	"Welcome to the Suck (Destiny Not Luck)"	Patrick, Kapila	3:13
7.	"Head of Fire"	Patrick, Grosse, Radtke, Tuller	5:00
8.	"Tremors"	Patrick, Kapila	3:43
9.	"Kid Blue from the Short Bus, Drunk Bunk"	Patrick, Kapila	3:56
10.	"Your Bullets"	Patrick, Grosse, Radtke, Tuller	4:37
11.	"Under the Tongue"	Patrick, Kapila, Ashley Dzerigian, Chris Reeve	6:10
12.	"(Can't She See) Head of Fire, Part 2"	Patrick, Kapila	3:47

Writing credits per AllMusic.

== Personnel ==
Band

- Richard Patrick – lead vocals, guitar, programming
- Oumi Kapila – guitar, programming, keyboards, string arrangements
- Ashley Dzerigian – bass
- Chris Reeve – drums
- Bobby Miller – keyboards, programming

Production

- Richard Patrick – producer
- Brian Virtue – mixing
- Howie Weinberg – mastering
- Oumi Kapila – co-production
- Michael Tuller – composer, programming
- Danny Lohner – composer, engineer, programming

== Charts ==
Chart (2016)	Peak position
US Billboard 200	151
US Top Alternative Albums (Billboard)	14
US Top Hard Rock Albums (Billboard)	4
US Top Rock Albums (Billboard)	20
US Indie Store Album Sales (Billboard)	25
