= Title of Record =

Studio album by Filter
- Released: August 24, 1999
- Recorded: 1997–1999
- Studios: Abyssinian Sons (Chicago) and The Townhouse London
- Genres: Alternative rock; industrial metal; hard rock
- Length: 70:23
- Label: Reprise
- Producers: Ben Grosse; Richard Patrick; Rae DiLeo

Filter chronology
Short Bus (1995)	Title of Record (1999)	The Amalgamut (2002)

Singles from Title of Record
- 1. "Welcome to the Fold" Released: August 10, 1999; 2. "Take a Picture" Released: January 18, 2000; 3. "The Best Things" Released: November 28, 2000

Title of Record is the second studio album by American rock band Filter, released on August 24, 1999, by Reprise Records. The album's earlier sessions were marred with slow progress due to lineup changes and frontman Richard Patrick's decision to construct his own studio for recording. However, progress improved after solidifying the lineup and bringing in further production help. In support of the album's release, Filter performed on the 1999 Family Values Tour.

Title of Record was a critical and commercial success upon its release, peaking at number 30 on the US Billboard 200. It had sold over 800,000 copies by 2001 and was later certified platinum by the RIAA for shipments of over one million copies. Three singles were released from the album: "Welcome to the Fold", "Take a Picture", and "The Best Things". "Take a Picture" became the band's most successful single, peaking within the top-20 of nine international charts, including the Billboard Hot 100.

== Background ==
The album was created over an exhaustive four-year period. After the release of Filter's 1995 debut Short Bus, which was created entirely by frontman Richard Patrick, Brian Liesegang, and a drum machine, the band toured in support of the album throughout 1996. In order to do this, a live band was recruited, consisting of Geno Lenardo on guitar, Frank Cavanaugh on bass, and Matt Walker on drums.

Reports of working on a second album started to arise in early 1997. Initial plans involved Patrick and Liesegang working together on a second album in a similar manner as their first album. Liesegang initially spoke of traveling across North America and recording on a PowerBook whenever inspiration hit them. He referred to a tentative title as Lung Butter, a tentative release date of September 1997, and hinted of moving in a more electronic direction now that the band had established themselves as different from Nine Inch Nails, of which they had both been a part prior to Filter. Prior to formal recording sessions for a new album, the two wrote and released a few songs on movie soundtracks, most notably the electronic rock track "(Can't You) Trip Like I Do" with the Crystal Method, which proved to be a turning-point for the two. The sessions strengthened Liesegang's conviction to move into more of an electronic, Radiohead-type musical direction, whereas it had the opposite effect on Patrick, inspiring him to keep the music heavy and guitar oriented.

With the two both unable to agree on how to proceed, constant arguing and power struggles ensued. Patrick's collaboration with The Crystal Method had also opened his mind to collaborating with different musicians, leading him to start attempting to push Liesegang out of the band. The resulting tensions and fighting led Lenardo, Cavanaugh, and Walker all to leave first. Relations between Patrick and Liesegang continued to deteriorate, and by mid-1997, due to Patrick's "creative dominance", Liesegang quit the band as well, leaving Patrick as the sole member.

Patrick, now on his own, attempted to restart the sessions for the album, but experienced further roadblocks:

"I kind of had to hit rock bottom. I didn't have a band. I didn't have a studio. I had this platinum record that showed up in the mail, and I had nothing except for my own talents. So at some point, I forced myself to play the guitar. I would force myself to write lyrics. I was playing people's demos. I was still into the band. It's just that I didn't have anything.

Patrick opted to start over by building his own studio, called "Abyssinian Son"; however, this ended up being far more complicated and time-consuming than he expected, with over two years going into dealing with realtors, property leases, and contractors to get the studio in functioning shape. Once preparations were complete, Patrick met up with, and started early sessions with music producer and sound engineer Rae DiLeo. However, after a month of sessions with just himself and DiLeo's guidance, Patrick decided not to do the entire album himself, and decided to seek out musicians, specifically, the Short Bus touring band.

As several years had passed since members had left, this led to difficulties as well. Walker was unable to return, as he had become the replacement touring drummer for the Smashing Pumpkins to replace drummer Jimmy Chamberlin. Lenardo initially was unable to return, as he had gotten married and had children and was living a life that was contrary to Patrick's requirements for him in the studio. However, after working through it, Patrick became more accommodating to his lifestyle, and Lenardo returned in a desire to provide for his family. Cavanaugh had been touring with Prong, but was able to return, and the band recruited new drummer Steven Gillis to replace Walker.

== Writing and recording ==
With a working band back together, the album's final sessions began. Some tracks, such as "Take a Picture" and "Welcome to the Fold", would still be written entirely by Patrick, while others would entail Lenardo coming up with a rough idea, and Patrick polishing it into its final form. The exception was "It's Gonna Kill Me", where Patrick conceded that Lenardo wrote the entirety of the music of the track. Cavanaugh did not contribute to the writing process other than creating the bass line to the track "Cancer", otherwise just playing as directed by others. Gillis oftentimes had to re-record his drum tracks multiple times due to Lenardo altering the guitar parts of the songs. The band continued to work with Dileo on the album, but also brought in music producer Ben Grosse to assist with the album's production and mixing. Other collaborators included D'arcy Wretzky, former bassist of the Smashing Pumpkins, who provided vocals for the chorus of the track "Cancer". Eric Remschneider, who had also contributed to the Smashing Pumpkin's song "Disarm" was also brought in to play cello on the opening track "Sand", lead single "Take a Picture" and closing track "Miss Blue".

Described as being "firmly within the industrial-metal tradition", the record expands on the grunge-influenced industrial rock sound of Short Bus with electronic textures and elements from folk, worldbeat and psychedelia.

In the liner notes for the 20th anniversary edition of Title of Record, Patrick revealed that he was in a relationship with Wretzky during the making of the album. "Take a Picture," "Skinny" and "It's Going to Kill Me" were written about her, while "Welcome to the Fold", "Captain Bligh", "Miss Blue" and "I’m Not the Only One" were written directly after their break-up. While doing press for the original album's release, Patrick refrained from divulging the identity of the love interest in his lyrics because Wretzky was still married to Kerry Brown during the affair, which they had kept secret from the public.

== Release and promotion ==
The album was released on August 24, 1999, and debuted on the Billboard 200 chart at no. 30. In support of it, the band performed on Family Values Tour 1999. By October 2001, the album had amassed over 800,000 sold, and was eventually certified platinum, indicating over one million units shipped. On August 9, 2019, the band released a 20th Anniversary reissue of the album via Craft Recordings, which compiled a number of b-sides and remixes that had been released separately around the time of the album's release.

== Reception ==
Professional ratings
Review scores
Source	Rating
AllMusic	4.5/5 stars
Alternative Press	4/5 stars
Robert Christgau	(dud)
Entertainment Weekly	B
Metal Hammer	9/10
Q	4/5 stars
Rock Hard	9/10
Rolling Stone	3/5 stars

The album was commercially and critically well received. AllMusic critic Stephen Thomas Erlewine praised the album for its "subtle differences in tension and dynamics that keep it fresh and engaging throughout", albeit "a little out of place within the modern rock world of 1999" (due to the prominence of nu metal) and ultimately "a strong album". Entertainment Weekly's Steven Mirkin regarded the record as "derivative", while noting the band's "attention to melody and craft" to be refreshing. Greg Kot of Rolling Stone thought that the album "rehashes the Jekyll and Hyde dynamics that have become alternative rock's creative downfall." Nevertheless, Kot further stated: "With Short Bus, Filter sounded like the latest and lightest in a long line of industrial-rock bands, but Title of Record expands the possibilities."

The album sold more than 1 million copies, and the hit single "Take a Picture" fared well on several charts. In 2005, Title of Record was ranked number 493 in Rock Hard magazine's book The 500 Greatest Rock & Metal Albums of All Time.

The album was featured as number 8 on Loudwire's list of "15 Best Hard Rock Albums of 1999".

== Track listing ==
All tracks are written by Richard Patrick, except where noted.

Title of Record track listing
No.	Title	Writer(s)	Length
1.	"Sand"		0:36
2.	"Welcome to the Fold"		7:40
3.	"Captain Bligh"		5:12
4.	"It's Gonna Kill Me"	Patrick, Geno Lenardo	5:04
5.	"The Best Things"		4:26
6.	"Take a Picture"		6:03
7.	"Skinny"	Patrick, Lenardo	5:43
8.	"I Will Lead You"	Patrick, Lenardo	3:23
9.	"Cancer"	Patrick, Frank Cavanagh	6:39
10.	"I'm Not the Only One"		5:49
11.	"Miss Blue" ( (Note: Track ends at 5:36; after 13 minutes of silence, incoherent screaming and backmasking occurs.))		19:48

Japanese edition
No.	Title	Writer(s)	Length
12.	"Jurassitol" (from The Crow: City of Angels soundtrack)	Patrick, Brian Liesegang	5:13
13.	"(Can't You) Trip Like I Do" (from Spawn soundtrack)	Patrick, Liesegang, The Crystal Method	4:28

German edition
No.	Title	Writer(s)	Length
12.	"One" (cover; from The X-Files: The Album)	Harry Nilsson	4:07
13.	"A Note from the Author"	Patrick	1:13

20th anniversary expanded edition bonus tracks
No.	Title	Writer(s)	Length
11.	"Miss Blue" ( (Note: This version of the song has most of the silence removed))	Patrick	7:05
12.	"Jurassitol" (2009 remaster version; from The Crow: City of Angels soundtrack)	Patrick, Brian Liesegang	5:13
13.	"(Can't You) Trip Like I Do" (2009 remaster version; from Spawn soundtrack)	Patrick, Liesegang, The Crystal Method	4:28
14.	"Take a Picture" (H&H remix; from "Take a Picture" single)	Patrick	4:17
15.	"The Best Things" (Humble Brothers remix; from "The Best Things" single)	Patrick	6:36

Footnotes

== Personnel ==
Band

- Richard Patrick – vocals, guitars, bass, programming
- Geno Lenardo – guitars, bass, sitar, mandolin, programming
- Frank Cavanagh – bass
- Steven Gillis – drums

Additional musicians

- D'arcy Wretzky – additional vocals on "Cancer"
- Eric Remschneider – acoustic cello, electric cello
- Jim McGrath – percussion
- Elliot Caine – trumpet

Production

- Richard Patrick – production
- Geno Lenardo – production
- Ben Grosse – production, mixing
- Rae DiLeo – production, programming, digital editing
- Bob Ludwig – mastering

== Charts ==
=== Weekly charts ===
Chart performance for Title of Record
Charts (1999)	Peak position
Australian Albums (ARIA)	41
Austrian Albums (Ö3 Austria)	34
Canada Top Albums/CDs (RPM)	40
German Albums (Offizielle Top 100)	20
New Zealand Albums (RMNZ)	12
UK Albums (Official Charts)	75
UK Rock & Metal Albums (Official Charts)	3
US Billboard 200	30
US Billboard Top Internet Albums	13

=== Year-end Charts ===
Charts (1999)	Peak position
US Billboard 200	189

== Certifications ==
Region	Certification	Certified units/sales
Canada (Music Canada)	Gold	50,000^{^}
United States (RIAA)	Platinum	1,000,000^{^}
^{^} Shipments figures based on certification alone.
