= Where Do We Go from Here (Filter song) =

Single by Filter

from the album The Amalgamut
- Released: June 20, 2002
- Genre: Alternative metal; nu metal
- Length: 5:34 (album version); 4:06 (single version)
- Label: Reprise; Warner Bros.
- Songwriters: Richard Patrick; Geno Lenardo

Filter singles chronology
"The Best Things" (2000)	"Where Do We Go from Here" (2002)	"American Cliché" (2002)

"Where Do We Go from Here" is a song by American rock band Filter for their third studio album, The Amalgamut. The song was released as the album's first single in 2002. "Where Do We Go from Here" peaked at 94 on the Billboard Hot 100. However, it managed to come close to the top ten of the Hot Mainstream Rock Tracks and Hot Modern Rock Tracks charts at number 12 and number 11, respectively. A popular remix of this song was made by The X-Ecutioners which gained extensive club play.

A music video was also produced for the song. It received moderate airplay upon release.

Like many of the band's singles, the single version of "Where Do We Go from Here" (the one used for radio and the music video) is much shorter than the album version. The album version extends the pre-choruses and bridge mostly.

== Chart performance ==
Chart performance for "Where Do We Go from Here"
Chart (2002)	Peak position
Australia (ARIA)	83
UK Singles (OCC)	80
US Billboard Hot 100	94
US Billboard Hot Mainstream Rock Tracks	12
US Billboard Hot Modern Rock Tracks	11
