= Brian Virtue =

- Born: Brian Virtue
- Origin: Southern California
- Genres: Rock, Hard rock, Indie Rock, Indie Pop, Pop
- Occupations: Record Producer, Mixer & Engineer
- Instruments: Piano, guitar, synthesizer, drums
- Website: www.brianvirtuemusic.com

Brian Virtue is an American Grammy-nominated music producer, engineer and mixer based in Los Angeles, California. Virtue has worked with artists including Jane's Addiction, Thirty Seconds to Mars, Audioslave, Deftones, Puddle of Mudd, Chevelle, Hawthorne Heights and Crazy Town. In the early 1990s, he began working in recording studios as an audio engineer which later developed into working as a producer. Virtue worked with producer Bob Ezrin on Thirty Seconds to Mars' self-titled album in 2001 and 2002, and developed into more work with Ezrin on Jane's Addiction and with Rick Rubin on Audioslave. In 2007, Virtue moved from Los Angeles to Nashville where he worked from his own studio, including recording Chevelle's Sci-Fi Crimes. Virtue also worked on the Jane's Addiction song "Superhero" which is the opening theme to the TV show Entourage.

== Selected discography ==
Artist	Year	Album	Producer	Engineer	Mixer	Musician
Filter	2016	Crazy Eyes		check	check	
Finch	2014	Back to Oblivion	check	check	check	check
Hawthorne Heights	2013	Zero	check	check	check	check
All That Remains	2012	A War You Cannot Win			check	
Chevelle	2009	Sci-Fi Crimes	check	check	check	
Thirty Seconds to Mars	2009	This Is War		check	check	
Deftones	2006	Saturday Night Wrist		check		
Audioslave	2005	Out of Exile		check		
Deftones	2005	Wax and Wane from B Sides & Rarities	check	check	check	check
Thirty Seconds to Mars	2005	A Beautiful Lie	check	check	check	
Jane's Addiction	2003	Strays	check	check	check	Programming
Thirty Seconds to Mars	2002	30 Seconds to Mars	check	check		check
Korn	1999	All Mixed Up	Re-M		check	
Crazy Town	1999	The Gift of Game		check	check	

Discography references
