= (Can't You) Trip Like I Do =

Single by The Crystal Method and Filter

from the album Spawn: The Album, Vegas (UK release), and Title of Record (Japanese and 20th Anniversary expanded edition)
- Released: October 7, 1997
- Recorded: 1997
- Genre: Industrial metal; big beat
- Length: 4:30
- Label: Epic/Immortal Records
- Songwriters: Scott Kirkland, Ken D. Jordan
- Producer: The Crystal Method

The Crystal Method singles chronology
| "Trip Like I Do" (1997) | "(Can't You) Trip Like I Do" (1997) | "Comin' Back" (1998) |

Filter singles chronology
| "Jurassitol" (1996) | "(Can't You) Trip Like I Do" (1997) | "One" (1998) |

"(Can't You) Trip Like I Do" is a reworking of "Trip Like I Do", a song featured on the Crystal Method's debut album Vegas. The track was recorded for the 1997 film adaptation of the Spawn comic book series. The song was co-written by Richard Patrick and co-produced by Brian Liesegang, both from Filter, who also appeared in the song's video. "(Can't You) Trip Like I Do" is the opening song on the film's soundtrack release, Spawn: The Album, and is heard in the end credits. The song was also used for the theatrical trailer of The Matrix, promotional trailers for the Enter the Matrix video game and reveal trailer of Spider-Man (2002) but it does not appear in the film or on the soundtrack.

Inspiration for the song came from a friend of Scott Kirkland who was using ecstasy and leaving voice mail messages telling him "I wish you could trip like I do."

== Track listing ==
1. "(Can't You) Trip Like I Do" (album version) – 4:25
2. "(Can't You) Trip Like I Do" (Danny Saber Remix) – 3:39
3. "(Can't You) Trip Like I Do" (instrumental) – 4:25
4. "Trip Like I Do" – 7:35

== Credits ==
- Tracks 1–3 written, recorded and produced by The Crystal Method and Filter
- Mixed by Ben Grosse
- Track 1 executive producer: Richard Bishop for 3 A.M.
- Track 2 remix and additional production by Danny Saber
- Track 4 written by K. Jordan/S. Kirkland; produced and mixed by The Crystal Method

== Chart positions ==
Chart performance for "(Can't You) Trip Like I Do"
| Chart (1997) | Peak position |
|---|---|
| Australia (ARIA) | 79 |
| Scottish Singles Sales (Official Charts) | 40 |
| UK Singles (Official Charts) | 39 |
| UK Dance (Official Charts) | 31 |
| US Billboard Active Rock | 30 |
| US Billboard Modern Rock Tracks | 29 |
