= Take a Picture (Filter song) =

1999 single by Filter

Single by Filter

from the album Title of Record
- B-side: "Take a Picture" (live)
- Released: September 28, 1999
- Genre: Alternative rock
- Length: 6:03 (album version); 3:41 (radio edit)
- Label: Reprise
- Songwriter: Richard Patrick
- Producers: Ben Grosse; Richard Patrick; Geno Lenardo; Rae DiLeo

Filter singles chronology
"Welcome to the Fold" (1999)	"Take a Picture" (1999)	"The Best Things" (2000)

Music video
- "Take a Picture" on YouTube

"Take a Picture" is a song by American rock band Filter. It was serviced to radio in September 1999 as the second single from their second studio album, Title of Record (1999). The song became a hit at the start of 2000 following its January 18 retail release, peaking at number 12 on the US Billboard Hot 100 and number three in Canada. It also became a top-10 hit in New Zealand, peaking at number eight on the RIANZ Singles Chart.

== Background and lyrics ==
Filter frontman and founding member Richard Patrick has said that the song is about him getting drunk on an airplane and taking off all of his clothes. Patrick expanded in greater detail in a 2008 retrospective interview:

"When I wrote the chorus to "Take a Picture" [...] it was just after my friend was like, "Do you remember anything you did last night?" And I was like, "What are you talking about?" She said, "My God, you were throwing beer bottles out of a cab window at a cop car. Do you remember that?" And I said, "Good lord, could you take my picture, 'cuz I won't remember." And that line just kinda stuck. Weeks later, I had another drunken experience – being on a plane and being blacked out and not feeling good and taking my shirt off, half in and out of consciousness – and I'm in the back of a paddy wagon. I'm thinking, "Oh my God, what is my dad gonna think of this shit?" Y'know, "Dad, what do you think about your son now?" So, the song is this amazing thing for me to look back on now."

Patrick's father was offended by this line, but Patrick explained to his father that each time he sings the line it has a different meaning because Patrick changes the tone in which he delivers the line each time it is sung. The song was a homage to the Was (Not Was) song "Dad, I'm in Jail", from their album What Up, Dog?.

== Chart performance ==
"Take a Picture" reached number 12 on the US Billboard Hot 100 on February 5, 2000, after reaching the top 40 on December 14, 1999. The song hit number one on Billboard's Dance Club Play chart on February 5, 2000. It became a top-five hit on the Billboard Mainstream Rock Tracks chart at number four and the Modern Rock Tracks chart at number three. It was also a top-ten hit on the Adult Top 40 at number seven and a top-twenty hit on the Mainstream Top 40 at number 15, giving the band their only hit on these two charts. Internationally, "Take a Picture" reached number three in Canada, number eight in New Zealand, number 25 in the United Kingdom and number 32 in Australia.

== Music video ==
A music video, directed by David Meyers, featured the band in a dreamlike sequence taking place in five different main scenes: a crashed and burning jet airplane in the middle of the ocean, underwater below it without scuba gear on, on a tiny search rowboat in the middle of the ocean, a room in a house being flooded by water, and on the roof of this flooding house. Several segments include supermodel Jaime King.

== Track listings ==
All live tracks were recorded at Hammerstein Ballroom, New York City, in November 1999.

US 7-inch, CD, and cassette single

1. "Take a Picture" (album edit) – 4:24
2. "Take a Picture" (live) – 7:10

US maxi-CD and Canadian CD single

1. "Take a Picture" (H&H mix) – 4:14
2. "Take a Picture" (Hybrid mix) – 8:07
3. "Take a Picture" (Rennie Pilgrem Thursday club mix) – 7:08
4. "Take a Picture" (Club 69 trance mix) – 9:42
5. "Take a Picture" (Club 69 trance dub) – 6:44
6. "Take a Picture" (Club 69 tranceappella) – 2:09
7. "Take a Picture" (video)
8. "Welcome to the Fold" (video)

UK cassette single

1. "Take a Picture" (edit) – 3:39
2. "Take a Picture" (live) – 8:05

UK CD1

1. "Take a Picture" (edit) – 3:39
2. "Take a Picture" (Hybrid mix) – 8:08
3. "Take a Picture" (Rennie Pilgrem mix) – 7:07

UK CD2

1. "Take a Picture" (edit) – 3:39
2. "Welcome to the Fold" – 5:07
3. "Hey Man Nice Shot" – 7:41
4. "Take a Picture" (video)

Australian maxi-CD single

1. "Take a Picture"
2. "Take a Picture" (Hybrid mix)
3. "Take a Picture" (Club 69 Trans mix)
4. "Take a Picture" (Rennie Pilgrem mix)
5. "Take a Picture" (H&H mix)

== Charts ==
=== Weekly charts ===
Chart (1999–2000)	Peak position
Australia (ARIA)	32
Canada Top Singles (RPM)	3
Canada Adult Contemporary (RPM)	36
Canada Rock/Alternative (RPM)	1
Europe (Eurochart Hot 100)	78
Germany (GfK)	98
Iceland (Íslenski Listinn Topp 40)	35
Latvia (Latvijas Top 40)	17
Mexico International (Notimex)	4
New Zealand (Recorded Music NZ)	8
Scottish Singles Sales (Official Charts)	18
UK Singles (Official Charts)	25
US Billboard Hot 100	12
US Adult Alternative Airplay (Billboard)	3
US Adult Pop Airplay (Billboard)	7
US Alternative Airplay (Billboard)	3
US Dance Club Songs (Billboard)	1
US Dance Singles Sales (Billboard)	3
US Mainstream Rock Airplay (Billboard)	4
US Pop Airplay (Billboard)	15

=== Year-end charts ===
Chart (1999)	Position
US Modern Rock Tracks (Billboard)	87

Chart (2000)	Position
US Billboard Hot 100	58
US Adult Top 40 (Billboard)	22
US Dance Club Play (Billboard)	23
US Mainstream Rock Tracks (Billboard)	21
US Mainstream Top 40 (Billboard)	63
US Maxi-Singles Sales (Billboard)	30
US Modern Rock Tracks (Billboard)	16
US Triple-A (Billboard)	17

== Certifications ==
Region	Certification	Certified units/sales
New Zealand (RMNZ)	Gold	15,000^{‡}
^{‡} Sales+streaming figures based on certification alone.

== Release history ==
Region	Date	Format(s)	Label(s)	Ref(s).
United States	September 28, 1999	Alternative radio	Reprise	
United States	November 15, 1999	Hot adult contemporary; modern adult contemporary radio	Reprise	
United States	November 16, 1999	Contemporary hit radio	Reprise	
United States	January 18, 2000	7-inch vinyl; CD; cassette	Reprise	
Canada	February 15, 2000	CD	Reprise	
United Kingdom	March 6, 2000	CD; cassette	Reprise	

== See also ==
- List of number-one dance singles of 2000 (U.S.)
