= Filter (band) =

American rock band

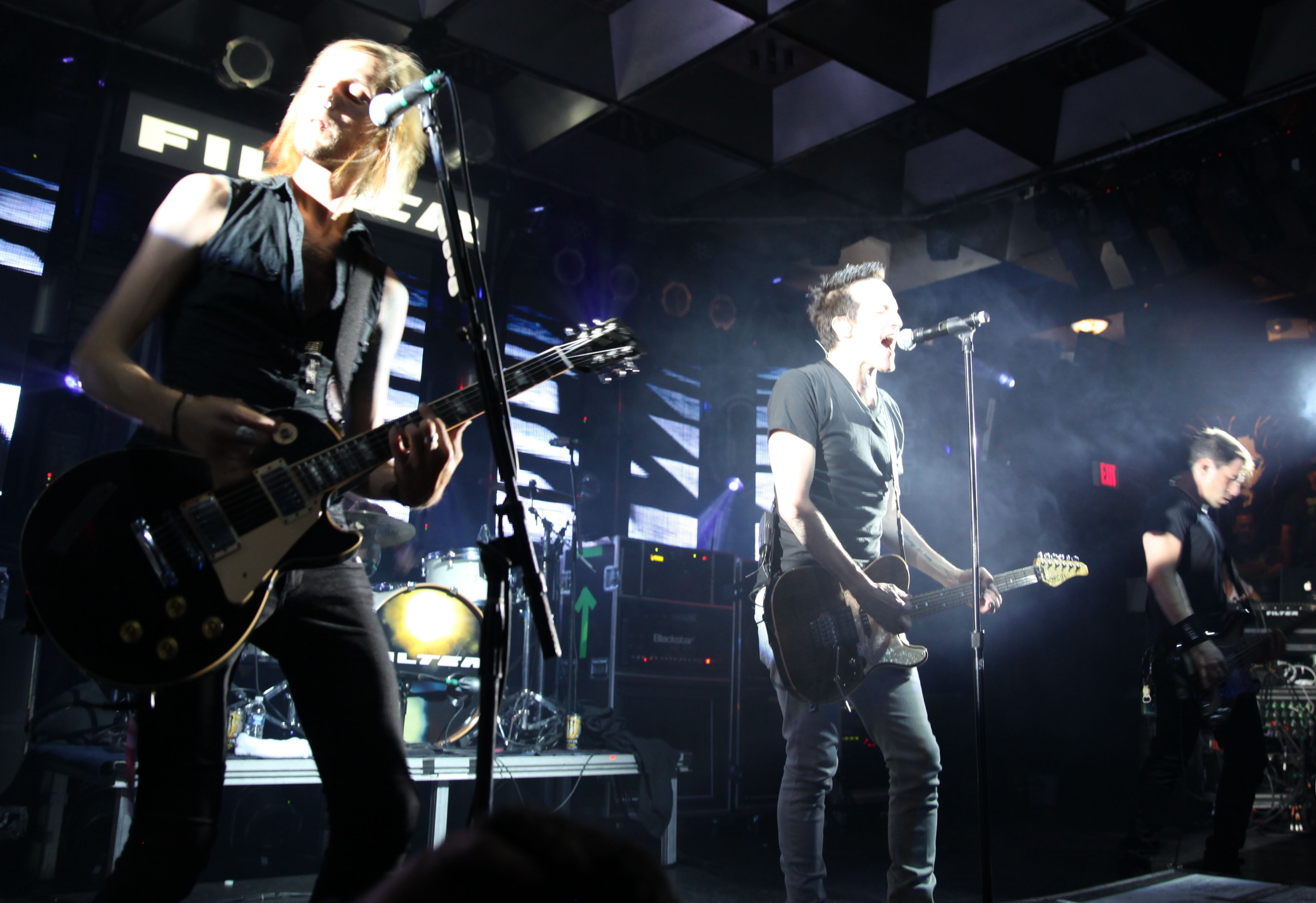
- Filter performing in 2013

Background information
- Origin: Cleveland, Ohio, U.S.
- Genres: Industrial rock; post-grunge; alternative rock; hard rock; industrial metal; alternative metal
- Works: Filter discography
- Years active: 1993–present
- Labels: Reprise; Wind-up; Pulse; Rocket Science; Golden Robot Records
- Members: Richard Patrick: Jonny Radtke; Bobby Miller; Elias Mallin
- Past members: Brian Liesegang; Matt Walker; Geno Lenardo; Frank Cavanagh; Steve Gillis; Mitchell Marlow; John Spiker; Mika Fineo; Rob Patterson; Phil Buckman; Jeff Fabb; Tim Kelleher; Oumi Kapila; Chris Reeve; Ashley Dzerigian; Greg Garman
- Website: officialfilter.com

Filter is an American rock band formed in 1993 in Cleveland, Ohio, by singer Richard Patrick, along with guitarist and programmer Brian Liesegang. The band was formed when Patrick desired to start his own band after leaving Nine Inch Nails as their touring guitarist. Their debut album, Short Bus (1995) received platinum certification by the Recording Industry Association of America (RIAA), supported by the single "Hey Man Nice Shot". After the album, the band would go through the first of many lineup changes, leaving Patrick as the only consistent member across all releases.

After Liesegang's departure in 1997, Patrick recorded a follow-up album with the Short Bus touring band members, who became full-time members thereafter. Their second album, Title of Record (1999) was met with similar success, supported by their hit single "Take a Picture". A third album, The Amalgamut (2002) followed after, though sales stalled with Patrick checking into rehab after years of heavy alcohol and drug abuse just as touring for the album had begun. The band went into hiatus while Patrick went to rehab, and then formed a new band, Army of Anyone, which released one self-titled album. After Army of Anyone went into hiatus, Patrick returned to Filter, releasing Anthems for the Damned in 2008, The Trouble with Angels in 2010, and The Sun Comes Out Tonight in 2013 with a revolving door of different musicians. A seventh studio album, Crazy Eyes, recorded with Patrick and another entirely new lineup, was released on April 8, 2016. In 2018, Brian Liesegang returned to Filter to work on a new album, reBus, which was meant to musically be the follow-up to Short Bus. Due to the PledgeMusic bankruptcy, reBus was shelved and Patrick commenced on recording The Algorithm, which was released in August 2023.

== History ==
=== Formation and Short Bus (1993–1998) ===
Richard Patrick played guitar with Nine Inch Nails during the touring for Pretty Hate Machine and in the music videos for Broken; he left the band while Trent Reznor was recording The Downward Spiral and began a new recording project with Brian Liesegang. Dubbing themselves Filter, they signed to Reprise Records in 1994 and recorded their first album, Short Bus, which was released in the following year. The album was commercially successful, and included the hit single "Hey Man Nice Shot". This song was somewhat controversial, as it was seen as capitalizing on the public suicide of R. Budd Dwyer. Kurt Cobain's suicide was widely rumored to have inspired the song, but the band denied this. The first single "Hey Man Nice Shot" was also included in the soundtrack for the movie Tales from the Crypt: Demon Knight in 1995 before Short Bus was released. In need of a live band to tour the album, Patrick and Liesegang recruited Geno Lenardo on guitar, Frank Cavanagh on bass, and Matt Walker on drums. They would all later be featured in the video for the album's second single, "Dose".

Between Filter's first and second albums, the band became known for their soundtrack contributions, The first of these tracks, "Thanks Bro", landed on the Songs in the Key of X: Music from and Inspired by the X-Files album. In 1996, Filter recorded and filmed the video for the song "Jurassitol", for The Crow: City of Angels soundtrack. They also released the home video Phenomenology in 1996, which showcased some of the band's live performances and music videos, as well as an interview with Patrick and Liesegang filmed in New Mexico. Liesegang left in 1997 shortly after recording the Filter/Crystal Method collaboration "(Can't You) Trip Like I Do" for the Spawn movie soundtrack, due to creative differences with Patrick. In 1998, for The X-Files film soundtrack, Patrick decided to keep the Filter name and recorded a cover of Harry Nilsson's "One".

=== Title of Record and The Amalgamut (1999–2002) ===
Patrick continued with 1999's Title of Record with returning members Lenardo and Cavanagh, as well as Steve Gillis on drums, filling in the gap left by Walker after he left to work with The Smashing Pumpkins. Title of Record moved away from industrial rock somewhat, and resulted in the band's biggest hit, the mellow ballad "Take a Picture", along with other lesser-heard singles "Welcome to the Fold" and "The Best Things". The song "Take a Picture" is about a dispute on an aircraft, when Richard Patrick drunkenly stripped down to his boxers, alarming the other passengers. "Miss Blue" is said to have been about Smashing Pumpkins bassist D'arcy Wretzky. She can be heard on the songs "Cancer", and "Take a Picture".

2002 saw the release of The Amalgamut, featuring the singles "Where Do We Go from Here?" and "American Cliché". "The Only Way (Is the Wrong Way)" was also featured in the first wave of the Hummer H2 commercials that year and in the 2003 movie Tomb Raider: The Cradle of Life. Alan Bailey was recruited for live guitar when they set off to tour the album; however, the tour ended abruptly in a matter of weeks when Richard Patrick voluntarily checked himself into rehab. He has since tattooed his date of sobriety, September 28, 2002, on his forearm. Lenardo, Gillis and Cavanagh all left the group at this time.

=== Hiatus and side projects (2003–2007) ===
Richard Patrick was part of the supergroup The Damning Well, which has only released one track on the Underworld movie soundtrack in 2003. While rumors sparked that an entire album's worth of material was produced, Patrick later denied this in an interview, stating the bits and pieces of other rough tracks mostly wound up in Black Light Burns, save for the track "In Dreams" on the then upcoming Filter album Anthems for the Damned.

Army of Anyone, a second supergroup side project with Korn drummer Ray Luzier and Stone Temple Pilots members Robert and Dean DeLeo, released its debut album on November 14, 2006. However, lack of sales of the album coupled with Richard Patrick's desire to do more work with Filter led the band breaking up around mid-2007.

=== Anthems for the Damned (2007–2009) ===
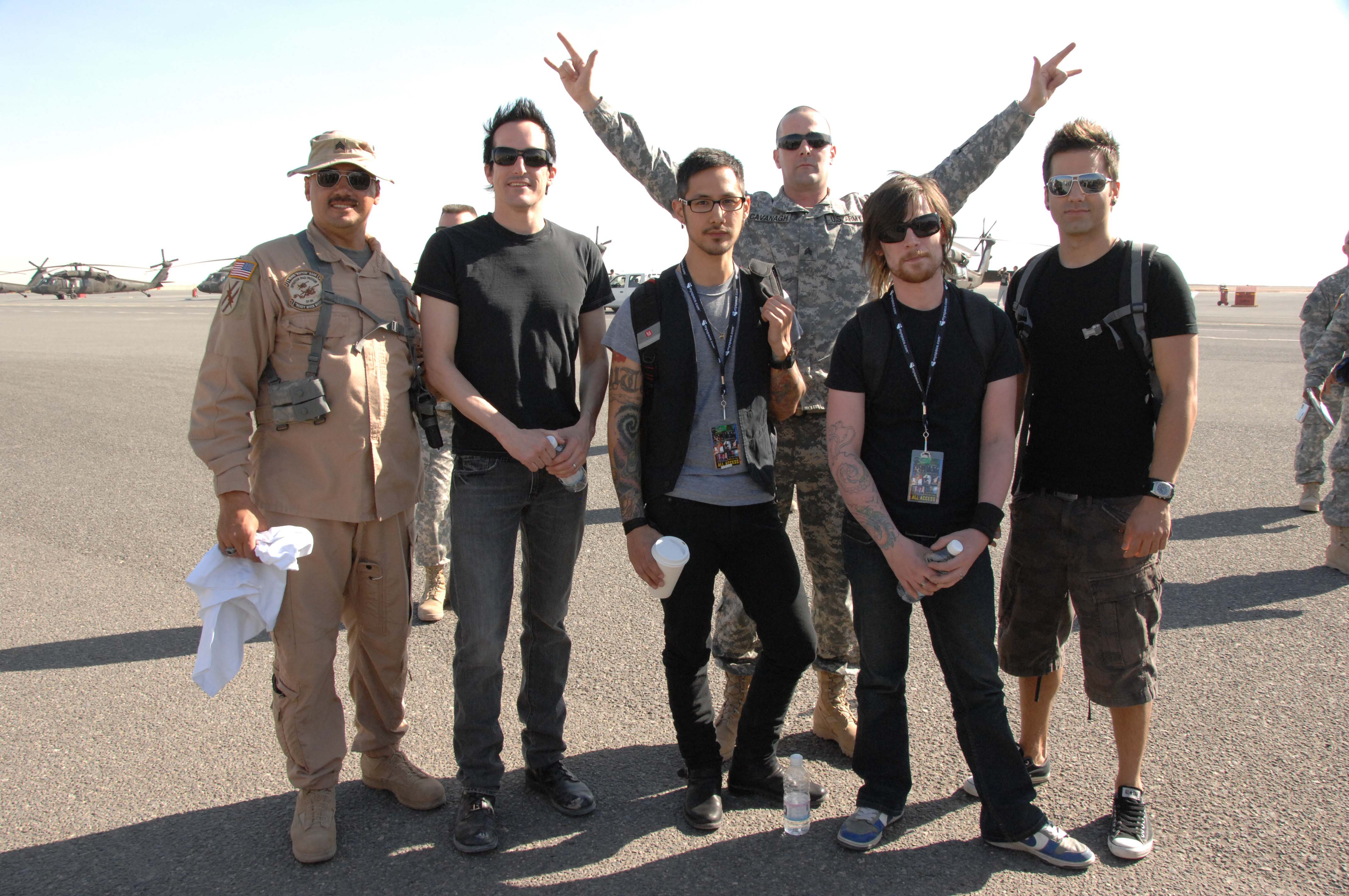
Filter in 2008 while in Kuwait

As Army of Anyone wound down, Patrick began working on material for a new Filter album, to eventually be titled Anthems for the Damned. Released to the public in May 2008, it was more serious in tone than some expected and expresses more of his mixed emotions regarding the state of the world and the state of his life.

On March 7, 2008, it was announced that Frank Cavanagh had reunited with Filter and would play as a live member at the operation Myspace concert in Kuwait. It was confirmed at Operation MySpace that he would not be joining Filter on the full tour as he would be shipping off to Iraq in April. The only song played live during the performance of March 10 by Cavanagh, now a Sergeant and Paralegal in the U.S. Army Reserve, was the band's first mainstream hit, "Hey, Man, Nice Shot".

Patrick also announced a remix album to Anthems for the Damned on November 4, titled Remixes for the Damned. Remixes for the Damned was released on November 21, 2008 in the U.S. and Canada. The remix album was released internationally on December 1, 2008. The lead-off single was "I Keep Flowers Around (Love's Labour's Lost)".

A greatest hits album entitled The Very Best Things (1995–2008) was released March 31, 2009. It featured tracks from all four previous studio albums and various movie soundtrack contributions, but no new content. There are 14 tracks total, with some tracks being radio edits.

=== The Trouble with Angels (2009–2011) ===
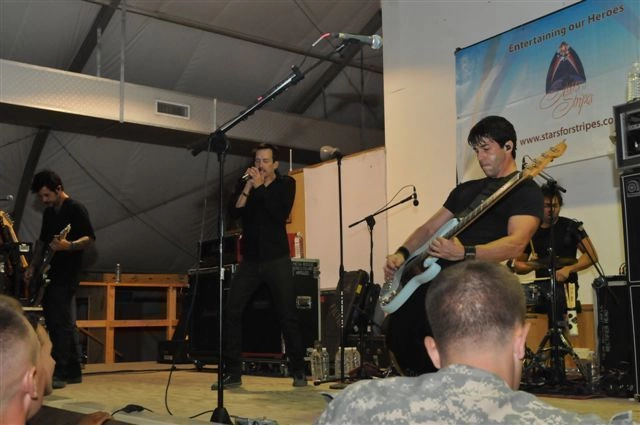
Filter performing in 2010

Filter started working on a fifth album shortly after the release of the remix and greatest hits albums, with Bob Marlette as a producer. The album, as said by Richard Patrick, would be a lot heavier than Anthems for the Damned and is to have a song written for the Amalgamut on it. He also stated he would be moving away from the political lyrical content present in Anthems for the Damned. When asked about the direction of his upcoming music style in an interview with Suicide Girls on September 13, 2008, Patrick said, "Actually the stuff I'm writing right now for a record that I'm going to release sometime next year is actually way more heavy industrial, more electronic. There's probably not going to be that many live drums on it."

Richard Patrick has stated on the Filter website that he has been recording songs for movies recently. Filter covered the song "Happy Together" by The Turtles for the soundtrack to the movie The Stepfather (2009). The song features ambient sound with alternative metal. It was used in a promo for the seventh season of Criminal Minds and also a trailer for Baz Luhrmann's The Great Gatsby (2013). Filter also contributed a new song "Fades Like a Photograph" for the soundtrack of the movie 2012 (2009). The song saw Patrick reuniting with former Filter co-conspirator, Brian Liesegang, who co-produced the track.

Through the end of 2009 and into 2010, Filter released a series of fourteen studio updates chronicling the progress made on the album. Each update touched on a certain part of the album process, such as "recording guitar parts" or "mixing the album". The last studio updates confirmed that the album recording had been completed. In their last studio video update, Richard Patrick showcased two clips from final mixed songs on iTunes that listed track listing and track lengths. While the video was legitimate, it was not the actual final track list, it was only a collection of new Filter songs on a playlist.

Filter released "The Inevitable Relapse", as their first single on May 26. The song was made available on the band's official website as a free digital download. The Trouble with Angels was released on August 17, 2010 on the Rocket Science Ventures record label.

After the album's release, the band also released a cover of ZZ Top's hit single "Gimme All Your Lovin'" which appears on the compilation ZZ Top: A Tribute from Friends.

=== The Sun Comes Out Tonight (2012–2013) ===
Patrick and Jonny Radtke entered the studio with producer Bob Marlette in April 2012 to work on the sixth Filter studio album, titled The Sun Comes Out Tonight. The first single off the new album, "What Do You Say", was released on April 2, 2013. A track entitled "We Hate It When You Get What You Want" was available on the band's official site as a free download (for a limited time). The official track listing for the album was released on March 18, 2013. The album was released on June 4, 2013. Phil Buckman announced that he left Filter on October 1, 2013, after finishing a tour in support of Stone Temple Pilots. Tim Kelleher, former bassist for Thirty Seconds to Mars joined Filter in October 2013.

=== Crazy Eyes (2014–2017) ===
In August 2014, Patrick announced his intention to work on a seventh studio album in late 2014. Later revealed to be titled Crazy Eyes, he aimed to keep recording time short, with the goal of releasing the album in 2015. Patrick states that he plans on writing again with Radtke, and this time also with touring members Hayden Scott and Tim Kelleher. On June 8, 2014, Patrick announced via Facebook that former guitarist Geno Lenardo has been extended an invitation to write music with the band. Patrick later commented that he was unsure if Lenardo would be able to commit to the formal recording sessions or not. Patrick later announced that he would be collaborating again with Liesegang, with whom he created Short Bus, and producer Ben Grosse, who produced Title of Record and The Amalgamut. Patrick also confirmed that the band would be in the studio in February 2015, and would then go on tour with Coal Chamber through March and April. For some of album's recording sessions for the album, the band announced the ability to watch to livestream half-hour or hour intervals of the band in the studio, costing $175 for a half-hour, or $300 for a full hour.

On March 4, 2015, Radtke announced he had left the band to pursue other musical interests. Shortly after, Filter's Facebook page updated its members, indicating that an entirely new touring lineup would support Patrick, including Oumi Kapila, Ashley Dzerigian, and Chris Reeve. On March 30, Filter launched a five-month campaign with PledgeMusic, offering fans the opportunity to have exclusive insights into the writing and recording of the new record. In a video update posted on PledgeMusic on December 4, Richard Patrick revealed the album is complete and is titled Crazy Eyes. On December 18, Filter stated via Facebook that the album would be released on April 8, 2016.

=== The Algorithm and The Antidote (2018–present) ===
In early 2018, original member Brian Liesegang returned to Filter after 21 years and started working with Patrick on the band's 8th studio album. The latter mentioned that "Brian and I are making the official follow-up to Short Bus (maybe), called Re-Bus." Liesegang offered an official statement regarding the project:

We are gearing up for official reboot of initial Filter. Working right at this instant together on lyrics. We have fun afternoons and focusing the loud and the pretty noise maelstrom. Gonna be a full length, and its hard or maybe not right to call it a sequel, as it's not so much that in that it is just a return to a certain approach and philosophy. Whatever. Not gonna overthink it, just do it. We'll figure that all out later... In the middle of it now.

In October 2018, the duo launched a PledgeMusic campaign to raise funds for production of the new album, tentatively titled ReBus. On July 18, 2019, Richard Patrick announced via Filter's Facebook that he and Liesegang would not release ReBus due to PledgeMusic's bankruptcy. Instead, Patrick announced he will focus on the twentieth anniversary re-release of Title of Record while he works on a new album, tentatively titled They've Got Us Right Where They Want Us, At Each Other's Throats with Radtke, who returned to the band.

On June 18, 2020, Filter debuted a music video on YouTube for the track "Thoughts and Prayers". Patrick had also stated in a story video on his Facebook the day before while promoting the release of the new single that the new working title for the upcoming album is Murica. The title track was released as a follow-up single on October 29, 2020. A new single, "For the Beaten", was released on October 14, 2022. Patrick stated this was the first single for the new album coming in Spring 2023 on Golden Robot Records, that the album's title has reverted to They've Got Us Right Where They Want Us, At Each Other's Throats, and that the two 2020 singles "Thoughts and Prayers" and "Murica" are not on the upcoming album. On May 5, 2023, Filter released a second single, "Face Down", for the once again retitled album, The Algorithm, due out on August 25, 2023. A third single, "Obliteration", was released on July 14, 2023. In the fall of 2023, Filter, along with Ministry, opened the Freaks on Parade tour, headlined by Alice Cooper and Rob Zombie. The tour spanned one month, lasting from August 24, 2023 until September 24, 2023, visiting 19 venues across the United States and Canada.

On June 13, 2025, Richard Patrick announced that Filter's ninth studio album was being recorded and would be titled The Antidote. Patrick also revealed one of the tracks would be called "Your Bark Is Bigger Than Your Bite".

A new single, "All The Good", was released to streaming platforms on July 11, 2025 to promote The Algorithm: Ultra Edition, a remastered version of The Algorithm with bonus material available August 8, 2025.

On August 1, 2025, the band was featured on the release of Finger Eleven's single "Blue Sky Mystery". Patrick provided vocals on the track and appeared in its respective music video. It peaked at number 6 on the Canadian Rock Billboard music charts in November 2025. The band will tour with support from Alter Bridge and singer-songwriter Tim Montana in 2026.

In June 2026, Patrick expressed hope that The Antidote will be released in early 2027, describing it as "heavy sounding, but it's also beautiful and light in certain areas. Just like all the other Filter records, there's that moment of brightness on it sonically. So, it's a gorgeous record."

== Musical style and influences ==
Filter's sound has been described as industrial rock, post-grunge, industrial metal, alternative rock, hard rock, electronic rock, alternative metal, nu metal, grunge, and pop rock. The band's debut, Short Bus, melded grunge with mainstream industrial music; music critic Greg Kot remarked that the record "finds a middle ground between grunge's world-weary sense of melody and industrial rock's icy steel-pulse rhythms." The record's heavy use of drum machine was influenced by the sounds of Ministry and Big Black; Patrick's other influences during Filter's early career included Pantera, Skinny Puppy, Butthole Surfers, Helmet, Soundgarden and Deftones, as well as the drop D tuning. Liesegang parted ways with the band after Short Bus due to creative differences; he has sought to incorporate more electronic sounds while Patrick opted for a heavier, guitar-oriented direction. The band's second full-length album, Title of Record, incorporated more diverse elements and sounds, drawing from folk, worldbeat and psychedelia in addition to industrial and grunge. The Amalgamut marked a continuation of the sound of its predecessor with juxtaposing softer and heavier tracks, while 2008's Anthems for the Damned featured the band's trademark sound of "heavy rock" with "equal parts of grunge, industrial, and '80s rock". 2013's The Sun Comes Out Tonight introduced an update to Filter's sound with newly introduced harmonies and electronic elements. 2016's Crazy Eyes marked a sharper return to the industrial sound with Patrick's rediscovery of his appreciation for industrial acts such as Skinny Puppy and Ministry, as well as modern electronic artists such as deadmau5; he has referred to the sound on the record as "new industrial".

== Awards and nominations ==
Award	Year	Nominee(s)	Category	Result	Ref.
International Dance Music Awards	2000	"Take a Picture"	Best Alternative 12"	Won	
MTV Video Music Awards	1995	"Hey Man Nice Shot"	Best New Artist in a Video	Nominated	
MTV Video Music Awards	2000	"Take a Picture"	Best Art Direction in a Video	Nominated	
MTV Video Music Awards	2000	"Take a Picture"	Best Cinematography in a Video	Nominated	
Teen Choice Awards	2000	Themselves	Choice Breakout Artist	Nominated	

== Members ==
=== Current members ===
Image	Name	Years active	Instruments	Release contributions
	Richard Patrick	1993–present	lead vocals; guitars; bass; programming; keyboards	all releases
	Jonny Radtke	2011–2015; 2018–present	guitars; backing vocals	The Sun Comes Out Tonight (2013); The Algorithm (2023)
	Bobby Miller	2014–present	bass, backing vocals (2019–present); keyboards, programming, guitars (2014–2019)	Crazy Eyes (2016); The Algorithm (2023)
	Elias Mallin	2012–2013; 2022–present	drums	The Algorithm (2023)

=== Former members ===
Image	Name	Years active	Instruments	Release contributions
	Brian Liesegang	1993–1997; 2018–2019	guitars; keyboards; programming	Short Bus (1995); The Trouble with Angels (2010); The Algorithm (2023)
	Frank Cavanagh	1995–2002 (one off 2008)	bass; backing vocals	Title of Record (1999); The Amalgamut (2002)
	Geno Lenardo	1995–2002	guitars	Title of Record (1999); The Amalgamut (2002)
	Matt Walker	1995–1997	drums	none
	Steve Gillis	1997–2002	drums	Title of Record (1999); The Amalgamut (2002)
	Mika Fineo	2008–2012	drums	The Trouble with Angels (2010)
	Mitchell Marlow	2008–2010	guitars	The Trouble with Angels (2010)
	John Spiker	2008–2010	bass	The Trouble with Angels (2010)
	Phil Buckman	2010–2013	bass	none
	Rob Patterson	2010–2011	guitars	none
	Tim Kelleher	2013–2015	bass	none
	Jeff Fabb	2013–2014	drums	none
	Chris Reeve	2015–2019	drums	Crazy Eyes (2016)
	Ashley Dzerigian	2015–2019	bass	Crazy Eyes (2016)
	Oumi Kapila	2015–2017	guitars	Crazy Eyes (2016)
	Greg Garman	2019–2022	drums	none

=== Former live and session musicians ===
Image	Name	Years active	Instruments	Release contributions
	Alan Bailey	2002	guitars	none
	John 5	2008	guitars	Anthems for the Damned (2008)
	Josh Freese	2008	drums	Anthems for the Damned (2008)
	Charles Lee Salvaggio	2008	bass	none
	Jeff Friedl	2012–2013	drums	none
	Tosh Peterson	2024	drums	none
	Ben Flanagan	2026	guitars; backing vocals	none

== Discography ==
- Short Bus (1995)
- Title of Record (1999)
- The Amalgamut (2002)
- Anthems for the Damned (2008)
- The Trouble with Angels (2010)
- The Sun Comes Out Tonight (2013)
- Crazy Eyes (2016)
- The Algorithm (2023)

== See also ==
- List of alternative music artists
- List of number-one dance hits (United States)
- List of artists who reached number one on the U.S. Dance chart
