= Hey Man Nice Shot =

1995 single by Filter

Single by Filter

from the album Short Bus
- Released: 1995; 13 May 1996 (UK)
- Genre: Industrial rock; post-grunge; electronic rock
- Length: 5:12
- Label: Reprise
- Songwriter: Richard Patrick

Filter singles chronology
"Hey Man Nice Shot" (1995)	"Dose" (1995)

Music video
- "Hey Man Nice Shot" on YouTube

"Hey Man Nice Shot" is a song by American rock band Filter. It was released as the first single from their debut studio album, Short Bus (1995). The guitar line in the chorus was previously used in the Stabbing Westward song "Ungod" in 1994. Stuart Zechman, who was also playing guitar for Stabbing Westward at the time, took the riff and showed it to Stabbing Westward, who ended up using it as well.

== Lyrics and music ==
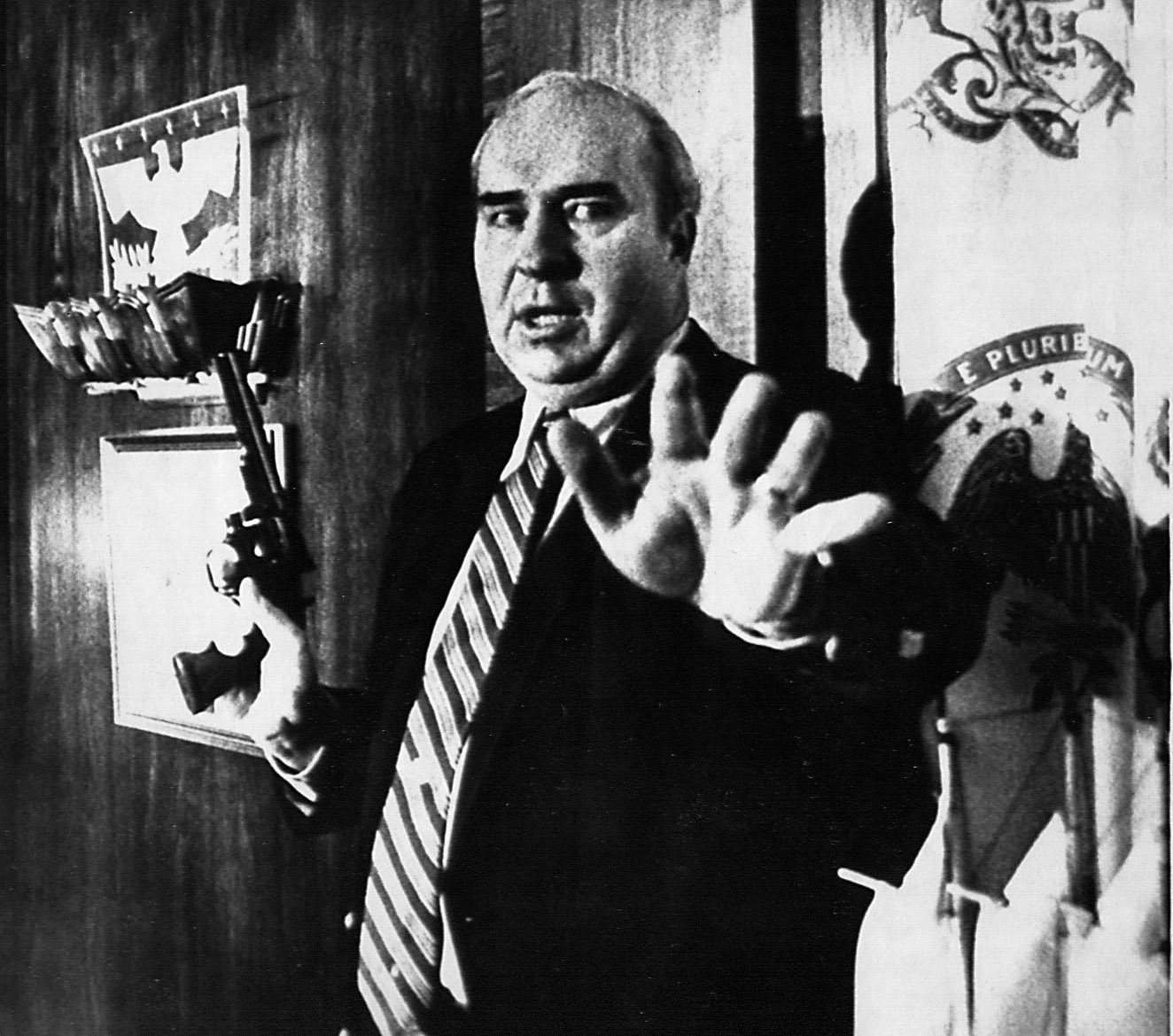
Politician R. Budd Dwyer moments before his public suicide in 1987. "Hey Man Nice Shot" is about the event.

The song was written about the public suicide of State Treasurer of Pennsylvania R. Budd Dwyer on January 22, 1987, in Harrisburg, Pennsylvania. Dwyer had been convicted of bribery charges in December 1986, and was expected to receive a lengthy sentence from U.S. District Court Judge Malcolm Muir. Professing his innocence and decrying the legal system, Dwyer shot and killed himself with a .357 Magnum revolver during a televised press conference. Filter frontman Richard Patrick grew up in a neighboring state and said he had been affected by seeing the incident on the TV news, describing it as "a scary topic" for him.

Patrick has said that the song was inspired by a videotape containing raw footage of Dwyer's suicide that he picked up from a bookstore on the 1991 Lollapalooza tour, while touring with Nine Inch Nails. The bridge of Marilyn Manson's "Get Your Gunn" (1994) includes audio from the press conference where Dwyer shot himself, including the sound of the gunshot that killed him. When Manson sampled the audio of Dwyer's suicide, Manson claimed that Patrick heard the sample and was excited by it. Despite the inconsistencies of the timeframe ("Get Your Gunn" was recorded in late 1993), Manson believes that this interaction inspired Patrick to write "Hey Man Nice Shot". Reflecting on the sample, Manson said "He wouldn't have even heard it if I didn't play it.... I don't like him very much. He bothers me."

Although Patrick frequently clarified this in interviews, emphasising the fact that he had first written the song in 1991 before the band even had a record deal, the song's popularity was augmented by a widespread perception that it was about the 1994 suicide of Kurt Cobain.

"Hey Man Nice Shot" was included in the 2001 Clear Channel memorandum of songs deemed to have "questionable lyrics" that made them unsuitable for American radio play post-9/11. 20 years after the attacks, Billboard interviewed several artists that had been on the list. Patrick recalled his unhappiness at the thought of the song triggering people, but also concerns over censorship, freedom of speech and the Taliban's own ban on music, adding, "I think it's dangerous that you're gonna ban stuff, but I get that this country was devastated, and it was an open wound for weeks afterward."

Musically, the verses of the song feature a "bed of ambient guitar" made with looped feedback. Commentary described "escalating tension between the restrained dread of the verse and the unleashed rage of the chorus" as the song alternated between loud walls of guitars and quieter sections with all instruments but drums and bass muted.

== Music video ==
There are at least two versions of the music video for "Hey Man Nice Shot". The first version uses the album mix of the song and the second uses the promo-only remix later heard in The Cable Guy. Both of these versions feature footage with color effects being added in during the post-production of the video.

== Track listing ==
US promotional 12-inch vinyl

1. "Hey Man Nice Shot" (1/4 Pound) – 5:00
2. "Hey Man Nice Shot" (1/4 Pound Instrumental) – 4:59
3. "Hey Man Nice Shot" (Nickel Bag) – 3:42
4. "Hey Man Nice Shot" (Big Mac) – 8:41
5. "Hey Man Nice Shot" (Big Mac Instrumental) – 8:43

German maxi-single

1. "Hey Man Nice Shot" (Bud Gets the Lead Out) – 5:14
2. "Hey Man Nice Shot" (Sawed Off Edit) – 5:20
3. "Hey Man Nice Shot" (Nickel Bag) – 3:43
4. "White Like That" (Dictaphone Version) – 2:12

US maxi-single

1. "Hey Man Nice Shot" (Sober) – 5:14
2. "Hey Man Nice Shot" (Nickel Bag) – 3:42
3. "Hey Man Nice Shot" (1/4 Pound) – 5:00
4. "Hey Man Nice Shot" (Big Mac) – 8:41
5. "White Like That" (Dictaphone Version) – 2:12

== Charts ==
Chart (1995)	Peak position
Canadian RPM Alternative 30	14
US Billboard Hot 100	76
US Alternative Airplay (Billboard)	10
US Mainstream Rock (Billboard)	19
US Radio Songs (Billboard)	68
