= Richard Patrick =

American singer (born 1968)

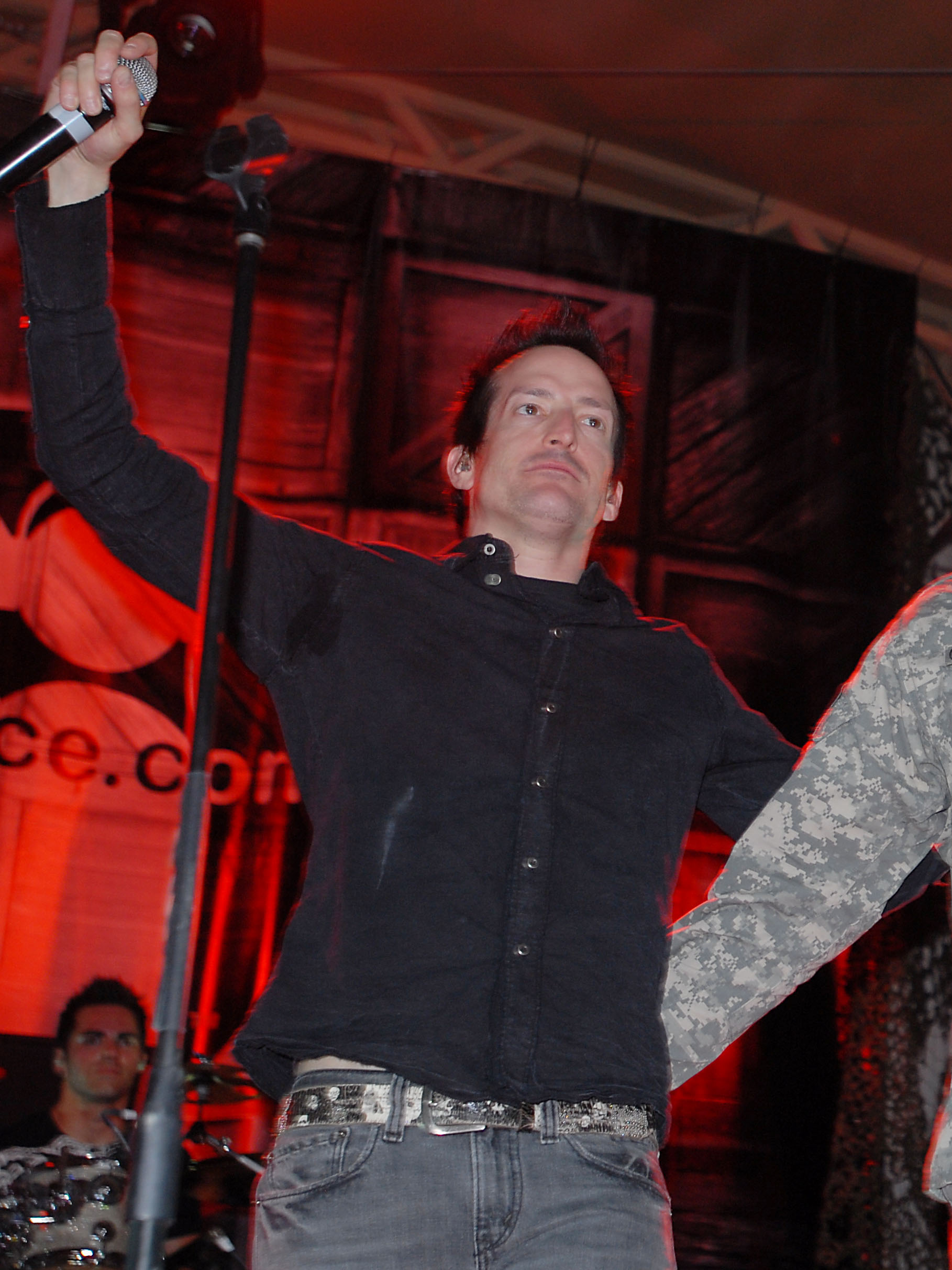
- Patrick performing in 2008

Background information
- Born: Richard Michael Patrick; May 10, 1968 (age 58); Needham, Massachusetts, U.S.
- Genres: Industrial rock; post-grunge; alternative rock; hard rock; industrial metal; alternative metal
- Occupations: Musician; singer; songwriter
- Instruments: Vocals; guitar
- Years active: 1986–present
- Member of: Filter
- Formerly of: Nine Inch Nails; Army of Anyone; The Damning Well
- Spouse: Tina Johnson (m. 2006)
- Relatives: Robert Patrick (brother)

Richard Michael Patrick (born May 10, 1968) is an American singer, musician and songwriter. He is the lead vocalist and only continuous member of the rock band Filter. He is also a founding member of the supergroups Army of Anyone and The Damning Well, and has served as a touring guitarist for Nine Inch Nails.

== Career ==
=== Nine Inch Nails ===
After a chance meeting with Trent Reznor in a Cleveland music store, Patrick landed a gig as touring guitarist in Reznor's live incarnation of Nine Inch Nails from 1989 to 1993. His only recorded contribution can be heard at the end of "Sanctified" on Pretty Hate Machine. Patrick also appeared in the music videos for "Down in It", "Head Like a Hole", "Wish", and one of the two promo videos for "Gave Up" (along with Marilyn Manson), which was filmed in the living room of the infamous house where Sharon Tate was murdered in 1969, as Reznor had leased the house and installed a recording studio in it. Patrick chose to leave the band during the recording of The Downward Spiral in 1993 following a comment from Reznor to "get up off his ass and go write a record" in response to Patrick asking for more money, further suggesting Patrick to work as a delivery driver at a pizzeria.

In September 2022, Patrick joined other past members of Nine Inch Nails onstage for a special performance, playing classic tracks from his time with the band as well as covering his Filter hit, "Hey Man Nice Shot".

=== Filter ===
Before his departure from Nine Inch Nails, Patrick formed his own band, Filter, with Brian Liesegang, who left the band after the recording of the band's first album, 1995's Short Bus. Four years later, Richard Patrick released Filter's second album, Title of Record, with help from guitarist Geno Lenardo.

Filter's third album, The Amalgamut, was released in 2002, with Patrick canceling most of the supporting tour to check into rehab for alcoholism, a problem that had been plaguing him for years. An experience where he drank on an airplane inspired Filter's hit single "Take a Picture."

After a five-year hiatus, Filter released a fourth record on May 13, 2008, entitled Anthems for the Damned. Patrick did the vocals and the majority of the instrumentation on the album except for the drumming, which was done by Josh Freese. He also worked with Wes Borland and John 5 on a few individual songs.

For the first time in the band's history, the band released an album without a three-to five-year break in between, with their fifth record, The Trouble with Angels, which was released just over two years after Anthems on August 17, 2010. Patrick recorded the album with the Anthems for the Damned touring band, Mikea Fineo, Mitch Marlow, and John Spiker, but recruited a new guitarist (Rob Patterson) and bass player (Phil Buckman) for touring in support of the album.

Patrick returned to the studio in April 2012, to work with producer Bob Marlette and Kill Hannah guitarist, Jonny Radtke, on his next Filter album, under the working title Gurney and the Burning Books. After Filter was signed to Wind-up Records in September 2012, Patrick released his sixth studio album The Sun Comes Out Tonight on June 4, 2013.

In early 2015, Patrick reunited with Ben Grosse, Michael "Blumpy" Tuller, Brian Virtue and former Filter guitarist Brian Liesegang to begin recording Filter's most recent album. After launching a PledgeMusic campaign, Patrick and contributing artists Oumi Kapila, Chris Reeve and Ashley Dzerigian released Filter's seventh studio album Crazy Eyes on April 8, 2016.

In 2018, Patrick reunited with Brian Liesegang to record a followup to Short Bus entitled Rebus, and funded the project using PledgeMusic. The project remains unreleased due to PledgeMusic going bankrupt. Patrick and Liesegang decided to mount a Title of Record 20th anniversary tour in the Fall of 2019, but the tour was cancelled due to scheduling conflicts with deadlines for film scores that Patrick was working on. In lieu of the Rebus release, Patrick instead released a new Filter album with a different lineup of musicians entitled The Algorithm.

On August 1, 2025 Patrick was featured on the release of the single Blue Sky Mystery by the Canadian rock band Finger Eleven. He was also featured in the single's official music video, performing his guest verse. On the week of November 10, 2025 "Blue Sky Mystery" has currently reached the No. 6 position on the Canadian Rock Billboard music charts.

=== Army of Anyone ===
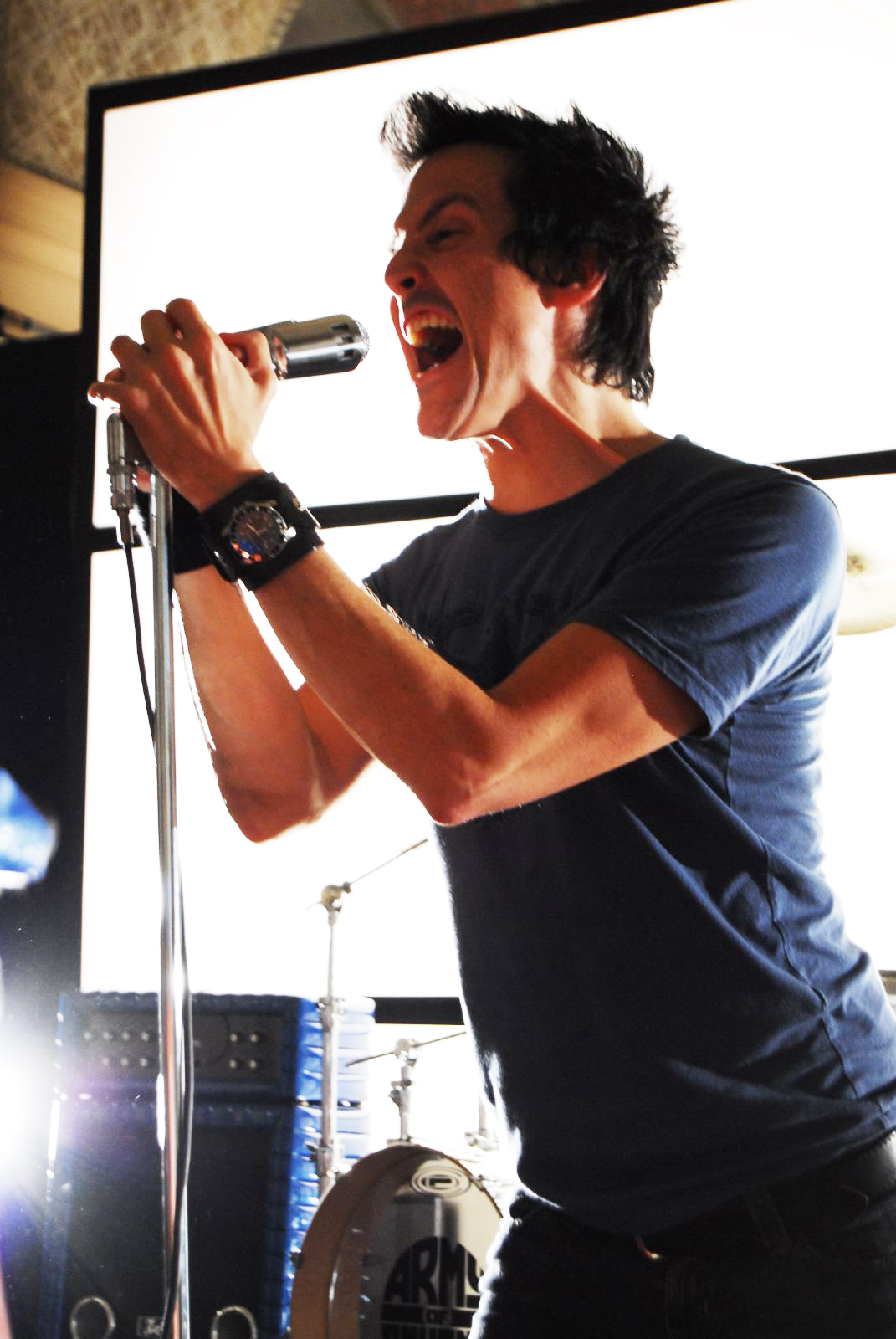
Patrick at a music video shoot for Army of Anyone in 2006

While writing songs for Filter's fourth album, Patrick called up the DeLeo brothers of Stone Temple Pilots to help him write a song. The result was a song called "A Better Place." Due to the chemistry the trio had while writing the song, they decided to form a supergroup, which became Army of Anyone.

On September 29, 2005, the formation of Army of Anyone was announced. Along with Dean and Robert DeLeo, future drummer for Korn, Ray Luzier, was also added to the line-up.

Army of Anyone's self-titled debut album was released on November 14, 2006. The album's first single, "Goodbye", peaked at number three on the US Mainstream Rock Tracks chart.

On May 26, 2007, Army of Anyone played their last concert to date in El Paso, Texas. The band has since been on hiatus.

=== Film composition ===
Patrick composed the score for Alexandros Avranas's 2016 film Dark Crimes, a crime thriller based on a 2008 David Grann article published in The New Yorker. In 2017, Richard and his brother Robert Patrick contributed to the film score of Last Rampage.

=== Writing ===
On August 25, 2008, Patrick wrote an editorial, "Talking About War", for HuffPost. He has since started writing a column, called Filtering The Truth, for Suicide Girls. His first post, about politics and religion, was posted on Election Day 2008.

== Personal life ==
Patrick grew up in Bay Village, Ohio. His older brother is actor Robert Patrick. His father was a banker. He was inspired from his mother, whom he described as “Southern Belle from Little Rock” but “rebellious” and told him to be different. He desired to become a guitarist and started playing when he was around 7 years old. He cites Neil Diamond, Mick Jagger, Joe Strummer, Nivek Ogre, Al Jourgensen and Bono as major influences. His brother had gotten him into punk.He graduated from Bay High School in Bay Village, Ohio in 1987.

Patrick and his wife Tina have a daughter, born in 2008, and a son, born in 2009. After years of alcohol and drug abuse issues, he has been sober since September 2002.

== Discography ==
| Year | Title | Artist | Notes |
|---|---|---|---|
| 1987 | "Walking in Circles"/"Looks Like Rain" | The Akt | |
| 1988 | Exhibit C: Ohio's Undercurrent | Various | "Broken Glass" (The Akt) |
| 1989 | Pretty Hate Machine | Nine Inch Nails | End guitar drone on "Sanctified" |
| 1995 | Details Sketchy | Dessau | Additional guitar |
| 2001 | Dualesc | Dualesc | Producer and additional guitar on "Belief"; tracks rereleased on Through the Floods, Not with Them (2002) |
| 2003 | Underworld (Music from the Motion Picture) | Various | "Awakening" (The Damning Well) |
| 2005 | Lords of Sounds and Lesser Things | Veruca Salt | Skit vocals |
| 2006 | Army of Anyone | Army of Anyone | |
| 2006 | Family Values Tour 2006 | Various | Vocals on "Pride (In the Name of Love)" (Flyleaf) |
| 2009 | The Truth Hurts 1985–2000 | Dessau | Guitar on "Suffer" |
| 2018 | Orogenesis | Stayte | Vocals on "So Quick to Turn" |
| 2022 | The Phoenix | Grey Daze | Vocals on "Believe Me" |
| 2023 | "The Killing Field" | A Place to Kill | B-side to "For the Beaten" (Filter) 7′′ single |
| 2023 | Machine and Bone | The Banishment | Vocals on "Max Pain" |
| 2024 | Rat Wars Ultra Edition | Health | "Free to Die" |
| 2025 | Contrast | Julian Gray | Vocals on "Out Here" |
| 2025 | Last Night on Earth | Finger Eleven | Vocals on "Blue Sky Mystery" |
| 2025 | Distress | Deadly Apples | Vocals on "Volatile" |

=== Film Scoring ===
As composer unless otherwise noted.

| Year | Title | Notes |
|---|---|---|
| 2008 | Repo! The Genetic Opera | Musician: Guitar |
| 2016 | Dark Crimes | with Tobias Enhus |
| 2017 | The Bye Bye Man | Guest vocalist on "Train Song" |
| 2017 | Last Rampage | with Tobias Enhus |
| 2018 | Edge of Fear | |
| 2019 | Comedy Kitchen | TV series |
| 2019 | Breathe Nolan, Breathe | |
| 2020 | The 2nd | |
| 2021 | Deadly Excursion: Kidnapped From the Beach | TV film |
| 2021 | Marked | Short film |
| 2022 | Pursuit | With David Wurst and Eric Wurst |
| 2022 | Chariot | |
| 2022 | Starf*cker | |
| 2022 | Disaster at Devil's Jaw | With Jeffrey Gold |
| 2023 | Protect the House | Documentary |
| 2025 | Gunslingers | |
