= Brian Liesegang =

American musician (born 1970)

- Born: February 10, 1970 (age 56); New York City, U.S.
- Genres: Alternative rock; electronic; industrial rock
- Occupation: Musician
- Instruments: Guitar; keyboards; vocals
- Years active: 1980s–present

Brian Liesegang (born February 10, 1970) is an American songwriter, producer, composer, guitarist and programmer, and a founding member of the rock band Filter.

== Career ==
After leaving Nine Inch Nails, Liesegang was the producer, guitarist and founding member of the rock band Filter along with Richard Patrick. Filter was formed in 1993 in Cleveland Ohio. The album Short Bus was released on April 25, 1995 and it sold over one million copies and features Brian's work with the band. It was recorded "in a small brick house somewhere in Chicago". It is best known for the hit single "Hey Man Nice Shot", reputedly about R. Budd Dwyer's public suicide; but the duo had hits on many soundtracks, working with The Crystal Method and The Dust Brothers. They embarked on an exhaustive world tour, as headliners, and opening for the likes of the Smashing Pumpkins, Ozzy Osbourne, White Zombie and more.... The duo was also nominated for "Best New Band" at the MTV music awards. Brian has been mentioned on each Filter CD released since then in the liner notes, but he actually left the band during the summer of 1997. He and Richard Patrick have remained friends, and Brian contributed some production work and guitar/keyboard parts to the Filter record, The Trouble with Angels in 2010 as well as "Fades Like a Photograph" from the movie "2012".
