= Short Bus (album) =

Studio album by Filter
- Released: April 25, 1995
- Genres: Industrial rock; post-grunge; alternative rock
- Length: 46:05
- Label: Reprise
- Producers: Brian Liesegang; Richard Patrick

Filter chronology
Short Bus (1995)	Title of Record (1999)

Singles from Short Bus
- 1. "Hey Man Nice Shot" Released: 1995; 2. "Dose" Released: 1995

Short Bus is the debut studio album by American rock band Filter, released on April 25, 1995, by Reprise Records. Lead singer Richard Patrick said in an interview that Trent Reznor had told him he should make his own record while he went off to work on Nine Inch Nails' 1994 album The Downward Spiral.

Short Bus was certified platinum by the RIAA on May 13, 1997.

== Background and recording ==
In the late 1980s and early 1990s, Richard Patrick was a touring guitarist for Nine Inch Nails. Patrick and musician Brian Liesegang initially conceived the idea of forming their own band after hiking at the Grand Canyon; Filter was subsequently formed in 1993. The line-up also briefly featured guitarist Stuart Zechman, who departed Filter to join Stabbing Westward. Stabbing Westward reportedly used the chorus guitar riff of "Hey Man, Nice Shot" on the title track of their 1994 album, Ungod; Patrick alleges that Zechman was in his presence while writing the riff and subsequently copied it.

Before obtaining a recording contract with Warner Bros. Records, Patrick had demoed some of the Short Bus tracks such as "Under" and "Dose" on his 8-track reel-to-reel recorder. A demo of "Hey Man Nice Shot" was recorded at Reznor's studio; the recordings from this session were later remixed by Ben Grosse. Three of the early recordings, including "Hey Man Nice Shot", were featured on 1994 promo EP, Erkenntnistheorie.

During the recording sessions, two musicians shared various roles: Patrick acted as the primary songwriter, bassist, and vocalist, while Liesegang mostly worked on the production and programmed the drum machine. The two shared guitar duties. A large portion of the album was recorded at a rented three-story house in Rocky River, Cleveland; the master bedroom was designated as the main studio while the basement and living room were reserved for the drum kit and guitar amps, respectively. The sessions lasted around eight months; a Macintosh Quadra and Studio Vision Pro were used to record some of the tracks. Half of the album's tracks, including "Gerbil" and "White Like That", were recorded on an 8-track recorder. While Ben Grosse was employed to mix the record to "give girth" to its sound, the band chose to master the record themselves: the mixes were tested on "consumer-level gear" such as car stereo and boombox for reference. According to Patrick, the house was demolished after the band's departure and the property was incorporated into the adjacent nursing home.

== Composition and lyrics ==
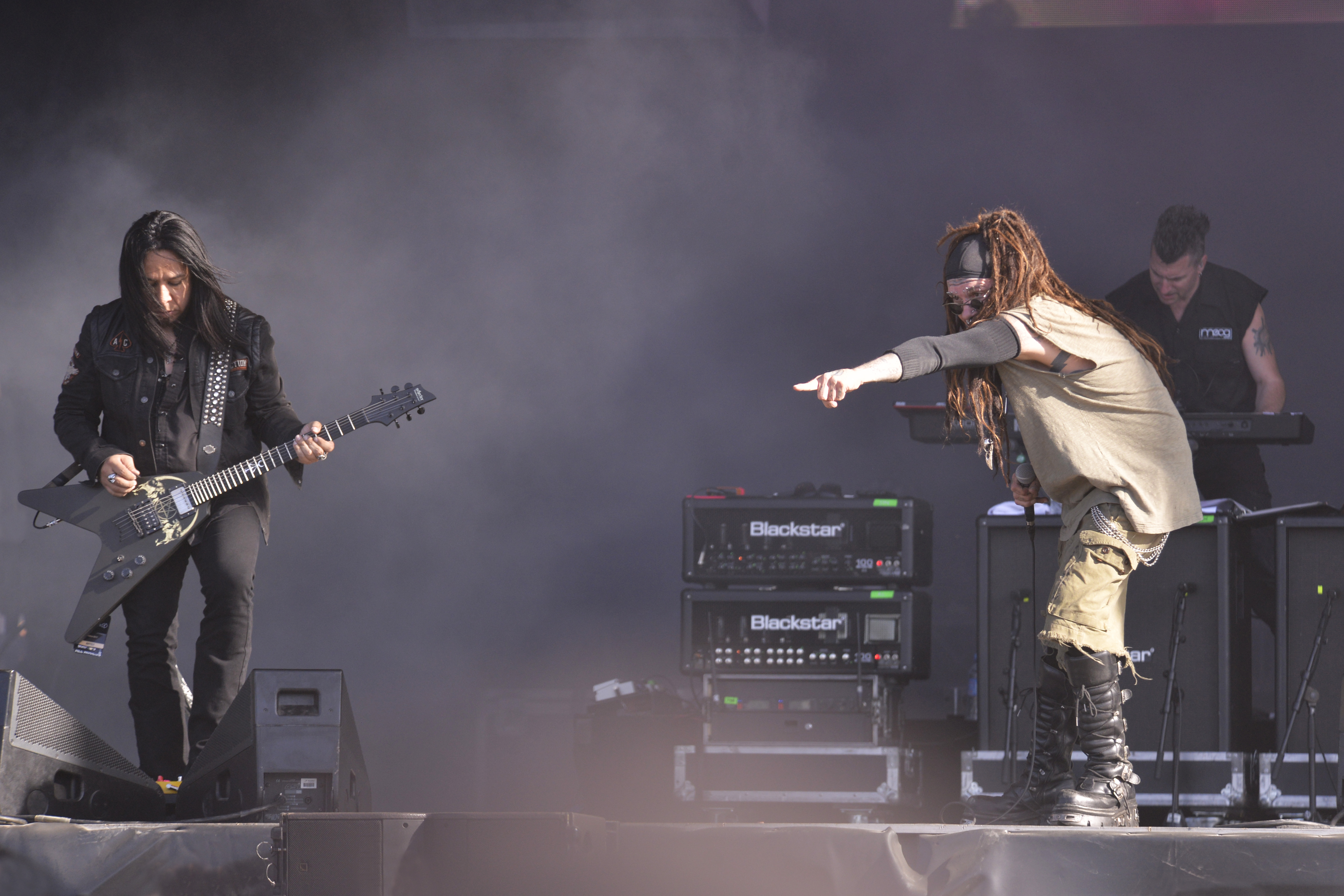

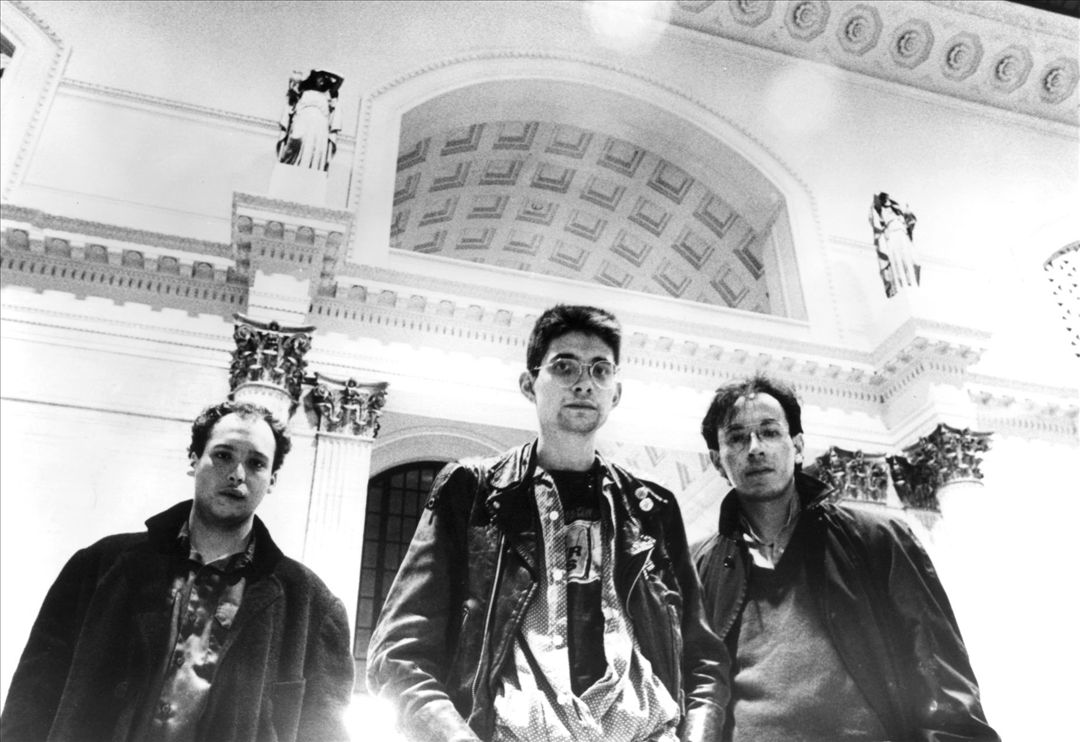
The band's choice to use a drum machine was influenced by the works of Ministry and Big Black.

Described as an industrial rock, post-grunge, and alternative rock record, Short Bus blends the industrial sound with grunge music. The Rough Guide to Rock writer Essi Berelian described the record as "a broad and imaginative slab of industrial noise, distinguished by Patrick's ability with a strong hook and melodic chorus." Richard Patrick has gone on to name bands such as Pantera, Butthole Surfers and Skinny Puppy as influences on the album's sound; Helmet and Soundgarden were also other early influences on Filter. The album's guitar-heavy sound features the use of a drum machine for percussion; the band's adoption of the digital instrument was influenced by the works of Big Black and Ministry's 1988 record, The Land of Rape and Honey. Music software was also used to process guitars and other sounds; the verses of "Hey Man Nice Shot" featured a looped feedback of a pick stratch. The band also incorporated the sounds of a broken toilet on the track "Stuck in Here". The track "It's Over" features a guitar drop that was recorded on a low-quality mini-cassette recorder; Liesegang has described the resulting recording as a "Robert Johnson spooky kind of sound". Other incorporated sounds on the record include answering machine vocals on "Spent" and television recordings on "White Like That".

Lyrical themes include religion and suicide, with the album's opening track and lead single "Hey Man Nice Shot" being written as a response to R. Budd Dwyer's televised suicide. The track was, at one point, rumored to be about the death of musician Kurt Cobain; however, the band has denied said rumor in the past. Similarly, "It's Over" was written about a mutual friend of the band who died by suicide, and was one of the first few songs written by the group. The album is named after the slang "short bus", which refers to the smaller school busses used by students with disabilities. Liesegang stated that the band chose the title for solidarity and reclamation.

== Packaging ==
The album was released with artwork similar to that of a package, with the tracklist and barcode being part of the front cover. Some pressings included a photo on the back tray, while others simply featured a tracklist against a bare background. The minimalist design was done in homage to Public Image LTD's 1986 recording Album.

An expanded edition was released by Concord Music on November 2, 2018. This version replaces the Reprise Records logo with that of Craft Recordings, which is Concord's reissue label. This version adds six new mixes: two of "Dose", three of "Hey Man Nice Shot", and one of "White Like That".

== Promotion and touring ==
The album spawned two major singles ("Hey Man Nice Shot" and "Dose") and a promotional single ("Under"), with "Hey Man Nice Shot" and "Dose" receiving music videos that featured an expanded line-up. The line-up included guitarist Geno Lenardo, bassist Frank Cavanagh, and drummer Matt Walker, who were all hired to back up Patrick and Liesegang for live shows. To promote Short Bus, the band would tour the United States, with footage taken during this time period later being released used for the 1996 Filter documentary Phenomenology.

Although originally intended to be touring members, Lenardo and Cavanagh would eventually join the band as full-time members to work on their 1999 follow-up album Title of Record.

== Critical reception ==
Professional ratings
Review scores
Source	Rating
AllMusic	4/5 stars
Collector's Guide to Heavy Metal	6/10
The New Rolling Stone Album Guide	2/5 stars

AllMusic critic Neil Z. Yeung praised the record, stating: "Filter never sounded quite like this again and Short Bus wound up being a singular snapshot cemented in time, a sleeper hit that became an enduring genre touchstone." Writing for The New Rolling Stone Album Guide, Greg Kot stated that the record "finds a middle ground between grunge's world-weary sense of melody and industrial rock's icy steel-pulse rhythms;" Kot further stated that the record "otherwise fails to take its Nails-Nirvana hybrid beyond the formula."

The album was featured on Loudwire's list of "10 Best Hard Rock Albums of 1995".

== Track listing ==
All music is composed by Richard Patrick

No.	Title	Length
1.	"Hey Man Nice Shot"	5:14
2.	"Dose"	3:54
3.	"Under"	4:19
4.	"Spent"	4:39
5.	"Take Another"	4:23
6.	"Stuck in Here"	3:35
7.	"It's Over"	3:37
8.	"Gerbil"	3:22
9.	"White Like That"	4:17
10.	"Consider This"	4:19
11.	"So Cool"	4:26
Total length:		46:05

== Personnel ==
Filter

- Richard Patrick – vocals, guitars, bass, programming, drums
- Brian Liesegang – programming, keyboards, guitars, drums

Additional personnel

- Richard Patrick – production, engineering
- Brian Liesegang – production, engineering
- Scott Kern – additional live drums, answering machine vocals
- Matt Drvenkar – answering machine vocals
- Jeff "Critter" Newell – additional engineering on "Dose"
- Kevin Hanley – additional guitar noise
- Mike Peffer – additional live drums
- Ben Grosse – mixing
- Deborah Norcross – art direction and design
- Chris Beirne – photography

== Charts ==
=== Weekly charts ===
Chart (1995)	Peak position
Canada Top Albums/CDs (RPM)	65
US Billboard 200	59
US Heatseekers Albums (Billboard)	3

=== Year-end charts ===
Chart (1995)	Position
US Billboard 200	195

== Certifications ==
Region	Certification	Certified units/sales
United States (RIAA)	Platinum	1,000,000^{^}
^{^} Shipments figures based on certification alone.
