= 2006 in rock music =

This article summarizes the events related to rock music for the year of 2006.

== Notable events ==
=== January ===
- The Strokes release their third studio album, First Impressions of Earth. The album was recorded as an effort to rekindle the success of their first album, Is This It, after their second album, Room on Fire, stalled critically and commercially. The album releases to mixed results. It debuts at number one on the UK albums chart - their only album of their career to do so, and has their tied-highest debut on the US all-format Billboard 200 albums chart, debuting at number 4, moving 88,000 copies in its first week. Despite high debuts, the album received mixed reception critically, and sales stalled; after 10 months, the album had only sold approximately half of what Room on Fire had sold.
- P.O.D releases their sixth studio album, Testify. It debuts at number 9 on the Billboard 200 chart, selling 54,000 copies in its first week.

=== February ===
- P.O.D.'s single "Goodbye for Now" peaks at number 48 on the US all-format Billboard Hot 100 song chart. It is the band's third and final song to find cross-over success, following "Alive" and "Youth of the Nation" in 2001. The song features backing vocals from Katy Perry a few years prior to her breakout into mainstream popularity.
- Hawthorne Heights releases their second studio album, If Only You Were Lonely. The album is their highest debut of their career, debuting at number 2 on the Billboard 200 chart, and their only album to ever reach the top 10 of the chart.
- Nickelback's single "Animals", tops the Billboard Mainstream Rock Songs chart and stays there for 6 consecutive weeks.

=== March ===
- Swedish rock band Katatonia - releases their seventh studio album, The Great Cold Distance. It is their first album to chart in the top 10 of a national albums chart, debuting at number 9 on Finland's chart. The lead single of the song, "My Twin", is also their only to ever break into a top ten position, peaking at number 9 on the Finnish singles chart.
- Atreyu releases their third studio album, A Death-Grip on Yesterday. It debuts at number 9 on the Billboard 200 chart, selling 68,664 copies in its opening week.
- Former Pink Floyd guitarist David Gilmour releases his third studio album, On an Island. It became his first solo album to top the UK albums chart, and was certified platinum.
- Embrace releases their fifth studio album, This New Day. It becomes their third album to top the UK albums chart, behind The Good Will Out (1998) and Out of Nothing (2004), and was certified gold.

=== April ===
- Godsmack releases their fourth studio album, IV. It is their second in a series of three studio albums to top the Billboard 200 albums chart, selling 211,000 copies in its opening week. It does mark a decrease in sales from prior albums though, with Faceless (2003) selling 267,000 copies in its debut week.
- Taking Back Sunday releases their third studio album, Louder Now. It debuts at number 2, second to Godsmack's IV, on the Billboard 200 chart, selling 158,000 copies. It is their highest debut for an album to date.

=== May ===
- Tool releases their fourth studio album, 10,000 Days. The album is their first in five years, and tops the Billboard 200 chart, selling 564,000 copies. The album is their second straight to top the chart, with Lateralus (2001) selling just 9,000 copies less in its debut. In its second week, it holds on to the number 3 spot, selling another 157,000 copies.
- Pearl Jam releases their eighth studio album, Pearl Jam. It debuts at number 2, just behind Tool's 10,000 Days, selling 279,000 copies. The debut is less than their albums released in the 1990s, but more than their prior 2 albums released in the early 2000s.
- Red Hot Chili Peppers release their ninth studio album, and double album, Stadium Arcadium. The album debuts at the top of the Billboard 200 chart. It is their first album to top the chart in their then 22 year long career. The album's lead single, "Dani California", tops the Billboard Mainstream Rock chart for 12 straight weeks, and finds cross-over success as well, peaking at number 6 on the all-format Hot 100 chart.
- Feeder releases their greatest hits album The Singles, which debuts and spends 2 consecutive weeks at number 2 on the UK all-format albums chart.
- The Raconteurs, a band formed by Jack White the year prior, release their first album, Broken Boy Soldiers. The album debuts at number 7 in the US and number 2 in the UK. Similarly, the lead single, "Steady, As She Goes", finds crossover success, peaking at number 54 in all-format US singles chart, and number 4 in the UK equivalent chart.
- Snow Patrol releases their fourth studio album, Eyes Open. Not only does it debut at number one on the UK albums chart, but it goes on to be the best selling album of 2006 in the UK.
- Angels and Airwaves, the new band started by Tom Delonge after the breakup of Blink 182 in 2005, releases their first studio album, We Don't Need to Whisper. The album debuts at number 4 on the Billboard 200 chart, but receives mixed reception after Delonge's grand proclamations leading up to release that the album would be "the greatest rock and roll revolution for this generation" and "the best music made in decades".
- Taking Back Sunday single "MakeDamnSure" peaks at number 48 on the Billboard Hot 100 chart. It is their only single to ever cross over to the all-format single chart.

=== June ===
- Australian rock band The Butterfly Effect releases their second studio album, Imago. It debuts at number 2 on the Australian national all-format albums chart.
- AFI - releases their seventh studio album, Decemberunderground. It tops the Billboard 200 chart, selling 182,000 copies. It is their only of their eleven studio albums to top the chart.
- Primal Scream release their eighth studio album, Riot City Blues. It peaks at number 5 on the UK albums chart and was certified gold. Its lead single, "Country Girl", reached number 5 on the UK singles chart, and was certified silver.
- Three Days Grace - releases their second studio album, One-X. It debuts at number 5 on the Billboard 200 chart, selling 78,000 copies.
- Underoath releases their fifth studio album, Define the Great Line. It debuts at number 2 on the Billboard 200 chart, selling 98,000 copies in its opening week. It would end up being a career-high for the band, a record for their record label, Tooth & Nail, and the highest debut for a Christian album since LeAnn Rimes' 1997 album You Light Up My Life: Inspirational Songs almost a decade prior.

=== July ===
- Tom Petty releases his third and final solo studio album, Highway Companion. It debuts at number 4 on the Billboard 200 chart. The album was deemed his last solo album by design, well before his death in 2017, with Petty stating that he'd rather make music with his band "the Heartbrearkers" instead.
- Muse releases their fourth studio album, Black Holes and Revelations. It tops five national album charts, including the UK chart.

=== August ===
- Stone Sour releases their second studio album, Come What(ever) May. It debuts at number 4 on the Billboard 200 chart, selling 80,000 copies in its opening week. It's later certified platinum by the RIAA.
- Breaking Benjamin releases their third studio album, Phobia. It debuts at number 2 on the Billboard 200 chart, and goes on to be their second straight platinum album. Its a career high until almost a decade later, when Dark Before Dawn (2015) tops the chart.

=== September ===
- Audioslave releases their third and final album, Revelations. The album aimed to add elements of soul and funk into their established hard rock sound. The album performed well upon release, debuting at number 2 on the US Billboard 200 chart, selling over 150,000 copies in its opening week, and topping the Australian and Canadian national album charts. However, the band doesn't tour in support of the album, with members returning back to their own separate musical projects, and eventually breaking up in early 2007.
- The Mars Volta releases their third studio album, Amputechture. It debuts at number 9 on the Billboard 200 chart, selling 59,000 copies in its opening week.
- Stone Sour single "Through Glass" - tops the Billboard Mainstream Rock chart and stays there for 7 consecutive weeks. The song also finds cross-over success, with it later peaking at number 39 on the all-format Billboard Hot 100 chart, the band's second of two songs to appear on the chart after "Bother" in 2002.

=== October ===
- The Killers - release their second studio album, Sam's Town. The album sees the band transition into a more heartland rock sound akin to Bruce Springsteen. While receiving mixed reception critically, the album still debuts at number 2 on the Billboard 200 chart, selling 315,000 copies in its opening week, and eventually going platinum. The album would remain their highest charting for over a decade, when Wonderful Wonderful tops the chart in 2017.
- My Chemical Romance releases their third studio album, The Black Parade. It debuts at number 2 on the Billboard 200, selling 240,000 copies. This is a massive increase from their prior album, Three Cheers for Sweet Revenge, which only sold 38,000 copies in its opening week.
- Canadian band The Tragically Hip release their tenth studio album, World Container. It debuts at number 2 on the Canadian Albums Chart, selling 27,000 copies in its first week. It was certified Platinum in Canada in the same month of its release.
- Deftones release their fifth studio album, Saturday Night Wrist. Despite difficult recording sessions, the album still debuts at number 10 on the Billboard 200 chart, selling 76,000 copies. The debut sells less than their prior album, Deftones, but more than any future albums from the band.
- Meat Loaf releases his ninth studio album, and third of the trilogy of Bat Out of Hell albums, Bat Out of Hell III: The Monster Is Loose. The album debuts at number 8 on the Billboard 200 chart, selling 81,000 copies. While this is the best debut since the release of Bat Out of Hell II: Back into Hell (1993), the album overall performs well under the prior 2 albums; Bat out of Hell goes 14× platinum, Bat Out of Hell 2 goes five times platinum, and Bat Out of Hell 3 fails to go platinum at all.

=== November ===
- Incubus releases their sixth studio album, Light Grenades. It debuts atop of the Billboard 200 chart, selling 165,000 copies in the US in its first week. It is their first, and only to-date, album to top the chart.
- Chris Daughtry's, fresh off of his success on the television show American Idol, forms a band, Daughtry, and releases their debut studio album. Daughtry. It debuts as number 2 on the Billboard 200 chart, selling 304,000 copies in its opening week. The album becomes a consistent seller throughout the rest of the year and into 2007, to the point be being declared the top selling album of all genre in the US in 2007.
- Oasis - releases their greatest hits album, Stop the Clocks. It debuts at number 2 on the UK albums charts, and eventually goes platinum five times in the UK.
- Rock supergroup Army of Anyone, featuring vocalist Richard Patrick of Filter, Dean DeLeo and Robert DeLeo of Stone Temple Pilots, and Ray Luzier, release their first an only album, Army of Anyone. While the lead single, "Goodbye" finds success, peaking at number 3 on the Billboard Mainstream Rock chart, the album itself sells poorly, peaking at #56 on the Billboard 200 chart, and the band breaks up shortly after in early 2007.
- American alternative rock band Brand New released their third studio album The Devil and God Are Raging Inside Me through Interscope Records. It debuted on Billboard 200 at No. 31 and sold 60,000 copies in its first week.
- +44, a band formed by Blink 182's Mark Hoppus and Travis Barker after that band's breakup in 2005, release their first and only studio album, When Your Heart Stops Beating. It debuts at number 10 on the Billboard 200 chart, selling 66,000 copies.
- McFly releases their third studio album, Motion in the Ocean. It peaks at number 6 on the UK albums chart, and was certified platinum. Its second single, "Star Girl", topped the UK singles chart, and was also certified platinum.

=== December ===
- Three Days Grace's single "Pain" tops the Billboard Mainstream Rock chart and stays there for 13 consecutive weeks.

=== Year end ===
- Three Days Grace's single "Animal I Have Become" is the most popular rock song at rock radio in the US for the year.

== Deaths ==
- Arthur Lee, 61, American rock musician, leader of the psychedelic band Love, and psychedelic rock pioneer, dies of leukemia.

== Band breakups ==
- The Distillers
