= Out of Time (Stone Temple Pilots song) =

Promotional single by Stone Temple Pilots with Chester Bennington

from the EP High Rise
- Released: May 19, 2013
- Recorded: May 2013
- Genre: Hard rock
- Length: 3:04 (album version); 3:10 (single version)
- Label: Play Pen, LLC
- Songwriters: Chester Bennington; Dean DeLeo; Eric Kretz; Robert DeLeo
- Producer: Stone Temple Pilots

Stone Temple Pilots promotional singles chronology
"Cinnamon" (2010)	"Out of Time" (2013)	"Black Heart" (2013)

"Out of Time" is a song by American rock band Stone Temple Pilots, released as a free download on May 19, 2013 via the band's official website. It is the band's first single not to feature Scott Weiland, and their first song to feature Linkin Park lead singer Chester Bennington. It is the first single, and the introductory track, from the band's debut EP, High Rise, which was released on October 8, 2013 through Play Pen, LLC. It became the band's seventh song to reach #1 on the US Mainstream Rock chart.

The song was named the official theme song to WWE Hell in a Cell. After this track was released, their second single "Black Heart" was launched online on September 17, 2013 through iHeart Radio and digital download. The second track is also featured on High Rise.

== History ==
On May 18, 2013, the three remaining members of Stone Temple Pilots performed together for the first time since firing Scott Weiland on February 27, 2013, appearing as special guests at the 21st Annual KROQ Weenie Roast benefiting Heal the Bay. The band was also announced as a surprise guest for the May 19, 2013 Live 105 BFD festival near San Francisco. At the KROQ Weenie Roast live performance, Bennington surprisingly took the stage with the band, performing original Stone Temple Pilots songs as well as a new song, "Out of Time," which was also released that same day as a free download. It was later announced by Bennington and the band in an exclusive KROQ interview that he was officially the new frontman of Stone Temple Pilots and that they were planning a new album and tour.

The new single was recorded and released via Stone Temple Pilots's official website on May 19, 2013 when Weiland was fired from the band. The updated website shows promotional pictures of Bennington and its remaining members of the band, implying that he will be recording and touring with the band in the near future. The band also made a surprise performance with Bennington as they performed the new song at 21st Annual KROQ Weenie Roast, benefiting Heal the Bay. The single was also released on iHeart Radio later on.

The band was also announced that a new guest would be performing with Stone Temple Pilots at the Live 105 BFD Festival near San Francisco, California on May 19. On the same day, the band released the song via their official website with new updates and promotional photos of the remaining members of the band and Bennington as the band's new lead vocalist, since the firing of Scott Weiland.

== Track listing ==
Digital download
No.	Title	Writer(s)	Producer(s)	Length
1.	"Out of Time"	Chester Bennington; Dean DeLeo; Eric Kretz; Robert DeLeo	Stone Temple Pilots	3:10

== Charts ==
=== Weekly charts ===
Weekly chart performance for "Out of Time"
Chart (2013)	Peak position
Canada Rock (Billboard)	4
US Rock Airplay (Billboard)	15

=== Year-end charts ===
Year-end chart performance for "Out of Time"
Chart (2013)	Position
US Rock Airplay (Billboard)	37

== Personnel ==
Band

- Chester Bennington – lead vocals
- Dean DeLeo – guitar
- Robert DeLeo – bass, backing vocals
- Eric Kretz – drums
