= Stone Temple Pilots (disambiguation) =

Stone Temple Pilots is an American rock band.

Stone Temple Pilots may also refer to:

- Stone Temple Pilots (1994 album), officially named Purple by the band, but often referred to as Stone Temple Pilots or 12 Gracious Melodies based on the fact that the title doesn't appear anywhere on the album
- Stone Temple Pilots (2010 album), the first official self-titled release by the band and the final release with Scott Weiland
- Stone Temple Pilots (2018 album), the first release by the band with Jeff Gutt and the first since the death of Chester Bennington
