= Army of Anyone =

American rock supergroup

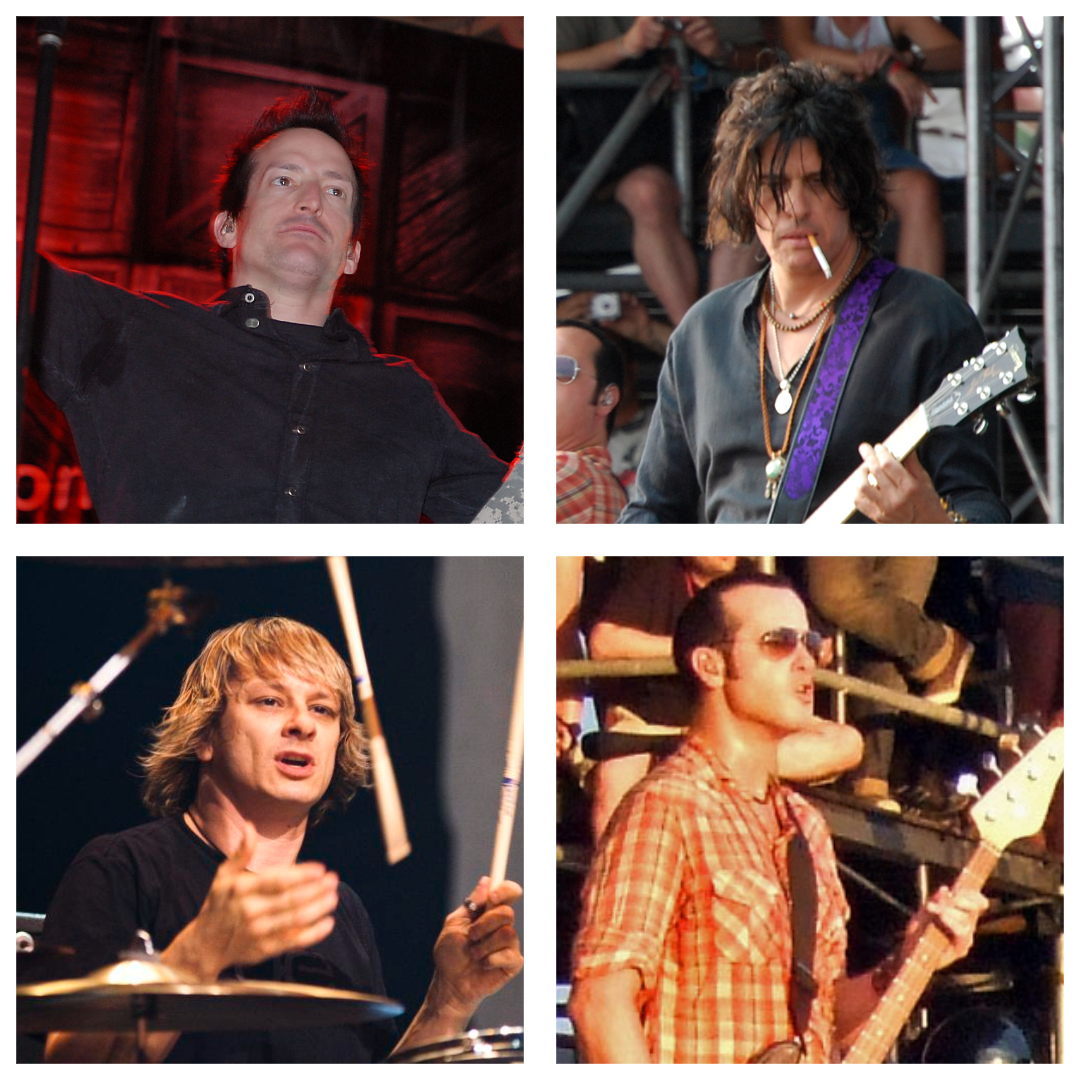
- Lineup of Army of Anyone. Clockwise from top left: Richard Patrick, Dean DeLeo, Robert DeLeo, Ray Luzier

Background information
- Origin: Los Angeles, California, U.S.
- Genres: Alternative rock; hard rock
- Years active: 2005–2007
- Label: The Firm
- Spinoff of: Stone Temple Pilots; Filter; Talk Show
- Past members: Richard Patrick; Dean DeLeo; Robert DeLeo; Ray Luzier

Army of Anyone was an American rock supergroup formed by Filter frontman Richard Patrick with two members of rock band Stone Temple Pilots. In addition to Patrick on vocals, the band featured brothers Dean DeLeo and Robert DeLeo (on guitar and bass respectively), and Ray Luzier, formerly of David Lee Roth's band (later Korn), on drums.

The band released one self-titled album in November 2006, which was well-received, but sold well short of the members' multi-platinum selling releases of their other bands, even despite the success of their first single, "Goodbye", which peaked at number three on the US Billboard Mainstream Rock Songs chart.

After releasing a second charting single, "Father Figure", and touring in support of the album, the band went into hiatus in mid-2007, with members returning to their respective bands, except Luzier, who joined Korn. Despite being relatively inactive since 2007, all members have stayed in contact, and have independently shown interest in working on a second album if the logistics and scheduling of their commitments to other bands ever aligned.

== History ==
=== Formation (2002–2004) ===
The band's formation traces back to Richard Patrick and the DeLeo brothers taking breaks from their respective bands, Filter and Stone Temple Pilots. Shortly after releasing Filter's third album, The Amalgamut, Patrick checked himself into rehab in October 2002, ceasing all band activity and touring for the time being. Around the same time, in late 2002, Stone Temple Pilots broke up due to increasing problems with lead singer Scott Weiland and his issues with substance abuse.

Once out of rehab, Patrick began writing new material for a fourth Filter album. Upon Patrick hearing that Dean and Robert DeLeo had wanted to work with him on a song for the album, he invited them over to do so. The result of their meeting was a track called "A Better Place", and a twelve-hour jam session. Patrick felt so strongly about the music that he put the fourth Filter album on hold, despite his record label urging him to continue, in order to start a new band with the DeLeo brothers. Ray Luzier was called to audition after the DeLeo brothers were impressed with Ray's sound check at a show. Luzier joined the band later after a successful auditioning. The band's name "Army of Anyone", was chosen as an allusion to the members' past troubles with bands, with Patrick explaining "We are all in the fight of life together, united in an army of anyone".

=== Debut album (2005–2007) ===
Formal recording for the band's debut album commenced in 2005. They entered the studio with Bob Ezrin, the producer behind Pink Floyd's epic rock opera The Wall. The band had recorded more than 30 songs in Patrick's home studio, 11 of which would make their way on to their debut album.

The album was originally slated for an early 2006 release through Columbia Records. However, most of the personnel who backed them at the label were fired during the process of recording the album, making them opt to change their label. Instead, the band signed to The Firm Music, a division of the band's management company The Firm, Inc., in an effort to avoid typical record labels and go straight to distributors. Beyond the label switching, Patrick commented further delay was caused by personal commitments, such as members' families getting married and having children. During this time, they also opted to replace the album's original mix with ones done by sound engineer Ken Andrews. They were able to fit this into their schedules because they used Andrew's Pro Tools set-up at his house, rather than renting time at a high-budget studio.

The album, simply titled Army of Anyone, was finally released on November 14, 2006. The band's first single was the track "Goodbye", which gathered significant radio airplay, peaking at number 3 place in the U.S. Mainstream Rock chart. However, the second and final single, "Father Figure", failed to match that success, only peaking at number 31 in the same chart.

The band started touring in support of the album on November 18, including performances of "Goodbye" on Late Night with Conan O'Brien and Last Call with Carson Daly. In addition to playing songs from the album, they also included covers of the Stone Temple Pilots songs "Big Bang Baby", "Vasoline", and "Interstate Love Song", as well as "Hey Man, Nice Shot", "Take a Picture", and "Welcome to the Fold" by Filter. Additionally, an interlude version of "The Rain Song" by Led Zeppelin was played on occasion. The band would also go on to headline the SnoCore Tour in 2007 with the band Hurt, and later toured with Three Days Grace.

The band had alluded to releases beyond their first release and touring cycle. A DVD release, containing studio footage of the group recording their debut album, was planned, but ultimately never released, in 2007. Patrick, shortly before the first album, anticipated that a second album would not be too far off. Dean DeLeo would also say that he wanted listeners to wait and judge the band's songs once the band had released their fifth record.

=== Hiatus and future (2007–present) ===
The album was not nearly as successful as their past individual projects, with the album only debuting and peaking at No. 56 on the Billboard 200, only selling 20,000 copies in its opening week, and only 88,000 copies as of April 2010. Dean DeLeo stated that the band was also unhappy about the performance, stating "We were all let down that that album didn't do what we thought it would do. It was a big let down for all of us."

In May 2007, the band quietly entered an indefinite hiatus upon the completion of touring in support of the album release. Later in the year, Patrick confirmed that he had returned to working on the fourth Filter album, and publicly announced that Army of Anyone was on hiatus. Patrick went on to record and release three new Filter albums, 2008's Anthems for the Damned, 2010s The Trouble with Angels, and 2013's The Sun Comes Out Tonight. Robert and Dean DeLeo rejoined Stone Temple Pilots when the band reunited in early 2008 to play a reunion tour and then released their self-titled sixth studio album in 2010. Ray Luzier became Korn's new drummer, officially being announced as a full-time member in April 2009.

Despite band members moving on to new or previous projects, they also alluded to the possibility of reforming in the future. Patrick said in an interview that he wouldn't mind possibly reuniting Army of Anyone someday, but only if the conditions weren't too difficult. Dean DeLeo answered similarly when asked the same question, stating "I don't know man, I would love to." In an interview after Korn's May 24, 2010 show in Omaha, Nebraska, Luzier went as far as to say that there were plans for all members to reconvene to work on a second album after Korn, Filter and Stone Temple Pilots' respective Summer 2010 tours. However, no other band members would report on such concrete plans, with Patrick even stating in a July 2010 that Filter was his main focus for the foreseeable future. He would also expand on this later on, complaining that the first one took too long (three years), and he and Robert DeLeo agreed it may be best to go back to their previous bands for now.

In 2011 and 2012, band members continued with the sentiment that it was possible, depending mostly on everyone's schedule. In a November 2011 interview, Patrick said of the future of the band:

Those guys are amazing, it's basically this simple: Robert has a studio in his basement where he can totally do his old-fashioned kind of classic sound. They can write and record at any moment in time, they can get Ray Luzier in to play drums and I can take it for a week or two and write vocals or sing it. So it's as easy as them kind of recording everything, which is actually probably tough because they're constantly working with Scott on Stone Temple Pilot stuff. So the band is always there, you know what I mean, we're alive, we talk, Dean and I are constantly in communication. Ray Luzier, every time I see him he's like "Man that Army of Anyone record is still, people still come up to me and talk about that Army of Anyone record". And I think that I honestly could probably do a way better job just 'cause of what I've learned lately as a singer...I think the best Army of Anyone record is still to come, it's still totally doable and could be even better.

When asked in May 2012 about the future status of Army of Anyone, Luzier reiterated Patrick's comments that they were still in contact, and even stated there was music they were working on, responding, "It's possible. We are all really good friends. We have a bunch of tunes in the works. I think if the time ever arose where we all could make our schedules fit, it would work out."

In July 2013, it was revealed that the Stone Temple Pilots would be touring with Filter starting in September 2013. With three of the four members of Army of Anyone present, Patrick hinted that some Army of Anyone songs could be revisited. However, in regard to working on new music as a band, Patrick referred to it as "a sleeping beauty" that " won't wake up for a long time to come". A year later, at a July 2014 Filter concert, Patrick alluded to starting work on a new Army of Anyone album soon. He later clarified that band members are currently in talks about if and how it would work, and that the music would largely be made by the other three members while he puts his vocals over it at the end of the recording process. As of 2016, Patrick still expressed interest in recording future albums with the band.

In May 2020, Patrick stated that a new song entitled "Summer Child", could possibly be released in the near future. Written by Patrick during recording sessions for a new Filter album, the song is currently awaiting additional recording and contributions from the Deleo brothers and Luzier. This song was later released on the Filter album The Algorithm in 2023, but without any production from the other Army of Anyone members.

== Band members ==
- Richard Patrick – vocals, rhythm guitar
- Robert DeLeo – bass guitar, vocals
- Dean DeLeo – lead guitar
- Ray Luzier – drums, percussion

== Discography ==
=== Studio album ===
- Army of Anyone (November 14, 2006)

=== Singles ===
Year	Song	U.S. Modern Rock	U.S. Mainstream Rock	Album
2006	"Goodbye"	21	3	Army of Anyone
2007	"Father Figure"	-	31	Army of Anyone
