= Soldiers of Misfortune =

Soldiers of Misfortune may refer to:

- Soldiers of Misfortune (album), 1991 album by Sacrifice
- Soldiers of Misfortune (song), 2008 song by Filter
- Army Men: Soldiers of Misfortune, a 2008 video game and the last home console title in the Army Men video game series
