= Between the Lines (Stone Temple Pilots song) =

Single by Stone Temple Pilots

from the album Stone Temple Pilots
- Released: March 22, 2010
- Recorded: 2009
- Genre: Grunge; hard rock; glam rock
- Length: 2:50
- Label: Atlantic
- Songwriters: Robert DeLeo (music), Scott Weiland (lyrics)
- Producers: Robert DeLeo, Dean DeLeo

Stone Temple Pilots singles chronology
"All in the Suit That You Wear" (2003)	"Between the Lines" (2010)	"Take a Load Off" (2010)

Music video
- "Between The Lines" on YouTube

"Between the Lines" is the first single from the American rock band Stone Temple Pilots's sixth studio album, Stone Temple Pilots. The single was released on March 22, 2010. The song set the record for largest positional gain on Billboard's Rock Songs chart, jumping from number 40 to 2, later reaching number 1. "Between the Lines" was nominated for Best Hard Rock Performance at the 53rd Grammy Awards, an award the band previously won for "Plush" in 1994.

== Composition ==
The music to "Between the Lines" was written by bassist Robert DeLeo, with lead singer Scott Weiland writing the song's lyrics. Guitarist Dean DeLeo on the song's structure:

Robert was thinking Animals or Zombies, a '60s go-go beat and a girl in a miniskirt. Sometimes we don't feel musically what Scott does lyrically. He took it to an exciting place. It's pretty twisted.

Weiland introduced the tune as a "punk song" in 2012 during a concert at Bethel Woods.

== Critical reception ==
A reviewer from the Kuwait publication Arab Times stated that the song "might not have the surefire hit potential of STP’s older singles", but applauded the band's return with the song, and called the song an excellent gift. Lehigh Valley Live staff writer Marcia loved the song musically, but stated that "the lyrics seem like an afterthought", additionally criticizing the resemblance to Bob Dylan's material. Second Dustin called the music strong and the riffs catchy, comparing the song to the material on earlier albums Tiny Music... Songs from the Vatican Gift Shop and Shangri-La Dee Da. USA Today stated that STP had "roared back to life with a shiny, infectious grunge-pop hit driven by a clever lyrical twist, stinging guitar solo, and charging beat."

== Music video ==
Drummer Eric Kretz stated in an interview with theaudioperv.com that the band would begin filming the music video for "Between the Lines" in early April 2010. On Friday, May 7, 2010, the band announced that the world premiere for the video would air that day during the broadcast FUSE TV's Top 20 Video Countdown.

MTV News stated that the video, which was directed by Christopher Sims, "feels like classic STP" and that "much like the song, it's a sweaty, claustrophobic affair, documenting frontman Scott Weiland's past history of drug use." Weiland said about the video's concept, "It's sort of like an off point of view, similar to The Prodigy's "Smack My Bitch Up." It was one of the coolest videos that came out in the last 15 years."

== Release history ==
Region	Date	Format
Worldwide	March 22, 2010	Promotional release (digital only)

== Appearances ==
"Between the Lines" was released as Downloadable Content on June 1, 2010, as part of a Stone Temple Pilots Track Pack with "Sex Type Thing" and "Plush" for Guitar Hero 5.

The song is also featured on the game Rocksmith.

== Chart positions ==
"Between the Lines" is the band's first #1 single on the Billboard Alternative Songs chart (they have had a total of three #2 singles on this chart in previous years), as well as the band's first song to ever chart on the Rock Songs chart, where it peaked at #1 for seven straight weeks. The song has also peaked at #50 on the Canadian Hot 100.

=== Weekly charts ===
Chart (2010)	Peak position
Canada Hot 100 (Billboard)	50
Canada Rock (Billboard)	1
US Bubbling Under Hot 100 (Billboard)	3
US Hot Rock & Alternative Songs (Billboard)	1

=== Year-end charts ===
Chart (2010)	Position
US Hot Rock & Alternative Songs (Billboard)	18

== See also ==
- List of number-one Billboard Rock Songs
- List of Billboard number-one alternative singles of the 2010s
