= What Do You Say =

What Do You Say may refer to:

- "What Do You Say" (Reba McEntire song)
- "What Do You Say" (Filter song)
