= Take a Load Off =

2010 single by Stone Temple Pilots

Single by Stone Temple Pilots

from the album Stone Temple Pilots
- Released: June 2010
- Recorded: 2009
- Genre: Grunge; hard rock
- Length: 3:11
- Label: Atlantic
- Composer: Dean DeLeo
- Lyricist: Scott Weiland
- Producers: Robert DeLeo, Dean DeLeo

Stone Temple Pilots singles chronology
"Between the Lines" (2010)	"Take a Load Off" (2010)	"Meadow" (2017)

Audio sample
- "Take a Load Off": file; help

Music video
- "Take A Load Off" on YouTube

"Take a Load Off" is a song by American rock band Stone Temple Pilots. "Take a Load Off" is the second track off the band's sixth studio album, Stone Temple Pilots, released in 2010. The song was the album's second single, after the #1 hit "Between the Lines". A music video for "Take a Load Off" was released on September 8, 2010. The song was used in Shift 2: Unleashed. It is also the band's last official major single to feature longtime member Scott Weiland before he would be fired from the band in 2013 and die in 2015 from a drug overdose.

== Composition ==
"Take a Load Off" was composed by guitarist Dean DeLeo. In writing this song, singer Scott Weiland listened to and studied poetical lyricists to learn how to free his writing from his autobiographical and "self-obsessed" nature. "There's an art to telling a story, and it can mean anything, or it can mean nothing."

== Charts ==
Chart (2010)	Peak position
Canada Rock (Billboard)	27
US Alternative Airplay (Billboard)	24
US Mainstream Rock (Billboard)	23
US Hot Rock & Alternative Songs (Billboard)	24
