= Talk Show (Talk Show album) =

Studio album by Talk Show
- Released: September 2, 1997
- Recorded: July 27, 1996 – August 23, 1996
- Studio: Conway Recording Studios
- Genre: Alternative rock
- Length: 41:53
- Label: Atlantic
- Producer: Talk Show

Singles from Talk Show
- 1. "Hello Hello" Released: 1997; 2. "Everybody Loves My Car" Released: 1997

Professional ratings
Review scores
Source	Rating
AllMusic	3/5 stars
Rolling Stone	(moderate)

Talk Show is the only release by Talk Show, a short lived band featuring Stone Temple Pilots members Dean and Robert DeLeo, Eric Kretz, and new singer Dave Coutts. The album was released in 1997 to generally favorable reviews, but only peaked at #131 on the Billboard 200. Deemed a commercial failure, the band split up in early 1998 and went their separate ways.

== Track listing ==
Talk Show track listing
No.	Title	Lyrics	Music	Length
1.	"Ring Twice"	Eric Kretz	Kretz	2:53
2.	"Hello Hello"	Kretz, Dave Coutts	Kretz, Dean DeLeo	2:57
3.	"Everybody Loves My Car"	Kretz, Coutts	Robert DeLeo	3:17
4.	"Peeling an Orange"	Coutts	D. DeLeo	3:35
5.	"So Long"	Coutts	R. DeLeo	3:38
6.	"Wash Me Down"	Coutts	Coutts	3:47
7.	"End of the World"	D. Coutts	Coutts, R. DeLeo	3:33
8.	"John"	Kretz, Coutts	R. DeLeo	3:02
9.	"Behind"	R. DeLeo, Coutts	R. DeLeo	4:16
10.	"Morning Girl"	Coutts	R. DeLeo	3:30
11.	"Hide"	Kretz, Coutts, R. DeLeo, D. DeLeo	Kretz, R. DeLeo	3:30
12.	"Fill the Fields"	D. DeLeo	D. DeLeo	4:14

== Personnel ==
All credits for Talk Show are adapted from the album's liner notes.

Talk Show

- Dave Coutts – vocals
- Dean DeLeo – guitar
- Robert DeLeo – bass; cover concept
- Eric Kretz – drums

Production personnel

- Talk Show – production
- Jim "Hootsie" Huth – recording and engineering assistance
- Jack Joseph Puig – mixing
- Jim Champagne – assistant mixing engineer
- Padraic Aubrey – assistant mixing engineer
- Bob Ludwig – mastering
- John Eder – cover photo & background imagery
- Dana Frank – band photo
- Richard Bates – art direction
- Edward Taylor – design
