= Anthems for the Damned =

Studio album by Filter
- Released: May 13, 2008
- Recorded: 2003–2008
- Genre: Industrial rock; hard rock; alternative rock; nu metal
- Length: 49:30
- Label: Pulse
- Producer: Josh Abraham

Filter chronology
The Amalgamut (2002)	Anthems for the Damned (2008)	The Very Best Things (1995–2008) (2009)

Singles from Anthems for the Damned
- 1. "Soldiers of Misfortune" Released: March 18, 2008; 2. "What's Next" Released: 2008

Anthems for the Damned is the fourth studio album by American rock band Filter. Started in 2003, the album saw many delays, as the band's sole member, frontman and founder Richard Patrick, took several breaks to pursue other musical interests, notably The Damning Well in 2003 and Army of Anyone from 2005 to 2007. Upon the breakup of Army of Anyone, Patrick decided to revisit the old material and finish it up for a final release. It was released to the public on May 13, 2008 through Pulse Records. It sold 13,000 copies its first week and debuted at number 42 on the Billboard 200.

== Background ==
=== Early sessions and hiatus ===
Work on Filter's fourth studio album traces back to early 2003. In July 2002, the band released their third studio album, The Amalgamut, though by the end of September of the same year, all touring and support of the album was cancelled in lieu of frontman Richard Patrick admitting himself into drug rehabilitation due to his excessive drug and alcohol use during the prior four years. While initially planning on just postponing the touring into 2003, Patrick eventually cancelled the tour outright, and instead returned to working on writing new music.

Mirroring the early sessions of creating their second album, Title of Record, Patrick started by working on the album entirely by himself without the assistance of prior band members Geno Lenardo and Frank Cavanaugh. By March 2003, Patrick had 5 songs written, and by the end of the year, he had 10 songs completed. Over the course of the same year, Patrick also worked briefly on a side-project called The Damning Well with Wes Borland, Danny Lohner, and Josh Freese. The group worked together on a number of tracks, but only one, "Awakening", was ever released from the band. Patrick eventually felt like returning to collaborating in Filter again after this, although, rather than with the prior two albums, when he would re-recruit Lenardo and Cavanaugh, Patrick instead chose to collaborate with Robert DeLeo and Dean DeLeo of the band Stone Temple Pilots, upon hearing they were interested in working with Patrick. The three set out to record a single Filter song for the album, the track eventually titled "A Better Place", however, by the end of their 12-hour jam session, the three felt so strongly about their musical chemistry that they felt they needed to create an entirely new band for the material. The three, along with drummer Ray Luzier, formed the band Army of Anyone, and released one album Army of Anyone, which contained "A Better Place", in 2006, and toured into 2007 until the band entered hiatus.

=== Later sessions ===
Work on the Filter album went on a hiatus from mid-2004 to mid-2007, with Patrick stating he felt uncertainty if the album would ever be released. However, upon Army of Anyone's breakup, Patrick revisited his old material, and decided to finish it up for a final release, partially due to an inspiring conversation with his brother, Robert Patrick. Patrick contacted John 5 to assist with the album. He recorded guitars for the album, and co-wrote two tracks; "What's Next" and "The Take". Patrick also recruited former members of The Damning Well for assistance; Borland for writing and guitar-work on "In Dreams", while Freese was recruited to play drums on the album. While the first sessions were drawn out for years, interrupted by sideprojects, the second sessions were completed over the course of fourteen days in the studio. The secondary sessions moved so quickly because Patrick had amassed so much material in the last five years; over 25 songs in total, allowing Patrick to weed through tracks he no longer liked or felt were no longer relevant.

== Themes and composition ==
Anthems was waking up after the drug-induced coma and waking up somewhere deep in the Bush Administration and being horrified with what we had done to the place...My real alcoholism started in '92, so by the time I snapped out of it, I had a look around the world and made a very socially conscious record.

— Richard Patrick on his shift to more politically themed lyrics after his successful stint in rehab.

In past albums, Patrick had written his lyrics around his own personal issues, many of which were about, or related to, drug and alcohol abuse. Upon his successful stint at rehab, and continued success in staying sober since, Patrick's focus was shifted beyond himself to more social and political related themes. A major inspiration for Patrick moving in this direction occurred from him learning that a twenty-three-year-old Filter fan, and maintainer of a Filter fansite, had died in the Iraq War, after only enlisting to begin with due to save up the funds to go to college. The occurrence was the basis of the lead single, "Soldiers of Misfortune", a song described by Patrick as "very pro-troops but vehemently anti-war.

In regards to overall sound, Patrick stated he aimed to have the album sound like "a heavy U2 record". Patrick described the album as more mellow and melodic than the prior three Filter albums, something he attributed to the influence of working with Abraham as a producer.

== Release, promotion, and aftermath ==
The album was released on May 13, 2008, though the band started touring in support of the release a month prior in April. With the album primarily being recorded by Patrick himself, he assembled a new touring band consisting of Mitch Marlow on guitar, John Spiker on bass, and Mika Fineo on drums. The album's first single, "Soldiers of Misfortune", was released well before the album's release, in March, while the album's second single, "What's Next?", was released in August. A remix album, entitled Remixes for the Damned, was later released in 2008.

The album stalled commercially, debuting at no. 42 on the Billboard 200 charts and selling only 13,000 copies. Patrick would later express remorse over his decisions in making the album.

I lost control of the album Anthems Of The Damned; I went in a different direction and followed the lead of the producer. I wanted to stay heavy because that's where I live that's what I'm about. I love anger and being aggressive. The focus on that album was the mellow stuff but ultimately it came down to me. The producer Josh Abraham and I were at odds and I lost control of that record."

== Critical reception ==
Professional ratings
Review scores
Source	Rating
About.com	4/5 stars
AllMusic	3/5 stars
ARTISTdirect	3/5 stars
Metromix	2.5/5 stars
Melodic	4.5/5 stars

The album received generally mixed reviews from critics. Stephen Thomas Erlewine of AllMusic criticized the album's meshing of urgent, political messages with overly-polished instrumentation, stating that "Patrick's urgent words [don't] quite [jib] with the well-executed mannered angst-rock...the disconnect isn't too dissonant, which is the problem: the whole affair feels just a shade too well-manicured -- the rhythms too tight, the guitars too well-scrubbed, the production too well-balanced -- and as a result, the album never gets underneath the skin with way Filter intended." Conversely, Consequence of Sound strongly praised the album, citing Patrick's vocals and lyrics as standout features, deeming it "a great album of musical playing fields and knives of vocal force. Patrick certainly has outdone himself and created a great album that's worthy of replays. The production is top notch, not a single note miscued and lyrically his best since 1995's Short Bus...Filter's fourth album hits a grand slam right out of the park." About.com critic Tim Grierson stated that the record is "impressive for its willingness to be so candid about a flawed society and the singer's place in it, provoking a series of songs that are sonically rich but also thematically compelling."

== Track listing ==
All songs written and composed by Richard Patrick, except where noted.

No.	Title	Writer(s)	Length
1.	"Soldiers of Misfortune"		4:25
2.	"What's Next"	Patrick, John 5	3:34
3.	"The Wake"	Patrick, Luke Walker	3:56
4.	"Cold (Anthem for the Damned)"		3:45
5.	"Hatred Is Contagious"		4:25
6.	"Lie After Lie"		3:45
7.	"Kill the Day"		3:31
8.	"The Take"	Patrick, John 5	3:16
9.	"I Keep Flowers Around"		4:27
10.	"In Dreams"	Patrick, Borland	3:51
11.	"Only You"		4:40
12.	"Can Stop This"	Patrick, Rae DiLeo	5:55
Total length:			49:30

Bonus tracks
No.	Title	Writer(s)	Length
13.	"Soldiers of Misfortune (Richard Patrick and Timmy the Terror Brade Runna mix)"		5:30
14.	"Kill the Day (Ben Wise club mix)" (UK release)		6:08
15.	"The Take (Stormin Norman mix J.O.B.)" (UK release)	Patrick, John 5	4:36
Total length:			65:44

== Personnel ==
Musicians

- Richard Patrick – lead vocals, guitar, bass, programming
- John 5 – guitar
- Wes Borland – guitar on "In Dreams"
- Josh Freese – drums

Production

- Josh Abraham – production
- Rae DiLeo – production, engineer, digital editing
- Marcus Samperio – assistant engineer
- Ryan Williams – engineer, mixing

== Charts ==
Chart (2008)	Peak position
UK Independent Albums (OCC)	43
US Billboard 200	60
US Independent Albums (Billboard)	5
US Top Alternative Albums (Billboard)	12
US Top Hard Rock Albums (Billboard)	8
US Top Rock Albums (Billboard)	14
