= Black Heart (Stone Temple Pilots song) =

Promotional single by Stone Temple Pilots with Chester Bennington

from the EP High Rise
- Released: September 18, 2013
- Recorded: 2013
- Genre: Hard rock
- Length: 3:10
- Label: Play Pen, LLC
- Songwriters: Chester Bennington; Dean DeLeo; Eric Kretz; Robert DeLeo
- Producer: Stone Temple Pilots

Stone Temple Pilots promotional singles chronology
"Out of Time" (2013)	"Black Heart" (2013)	"The Art of Letting Go" (2018)

"Black Heart" is a song by American rock band Stone Temple Pilots, released on September 18, 2013, via digital download. It is their second single to not feature their original lead vocalist Scott Weiland, and their second and final single to feature Linkin Park lead singer Chester Bennington. The song is also the second track that appears on their debut studio EP, High Rise, which was released on October 8, 2013, through their self-record label Play Pen, LLC. The song was also released on the same day through iHeart Radio.

== Background ==
In an article from Loudwire, it is described as having "a retro vibe with a main riff that's memorable and destined for a lot for radio airplay, which can follow their previous single 'Out of Time' to the top of the mainstream rock chart. The addition to the band for Bennington has been welcome for current Stone Temple Pilots' bassist Robert DeLeo, who said that 'it's been great, and a huge breath of fresh air with a lot more sanity, more reasoning, and patience.'"

Robert DeLeo states in an article from Noisecreep regarding debuting his special bass guitar on the song that "it's special for me because I just brought and found a rare bass guitar that I've been looking for in years, and I got a chance to use it for the song, so it meant a lot to me, to do that from a gear geek kind of perspective." DeLeo also stated that he has "been looking for a Rickenbacker 400 bass, and it's a very rare 1971 Rickenbacker bass. There were 20 of those made in '71, which is very rare and collectible." He also stated that "dreaming of instruments as a little kid and actually having one to use it on a song that you would put together, which means a lot."

== Live performances ==
The three remaining members (including brothers Robert and Dean DeLeo, and Eric Kretz) of the band performed the song with Bennington on The Tonight Show with Jay Leno on October 3, 2013, to promote High Rise before it was released on October 8. They also hosted a special of Rockline on October 7 that hyped their debut studio extended play that was released a day later. A video of the acoustic performance for the song by the band can be seen on the official YouTube channel, KROQ.

== Music video ==
A lyric video was launched on September 23, 2013, via the band's official YouTube channel. The three-minute clip for the lyric video of "Black Heart" shows closeups of a man with varieties of tattoos all over his body, which also features lyrics from the song, along with tattoos of scorpions, spiders, and guns. An official music video of the song was released on January 29, 2014. It was directed by Glendon and Isabella.

== Track listing ==
Digital download
No.	Title	Writer(s)	Producer	Length
1.	"Black Heart"	Chester Bennington; Dean DeLeo; Eric Kretz; Robert DeLeo	Stone Temple Pilots	3:10

== Charts ==
Chart (2013)	Peak position
Canada Rock (Billboard)	4
US Mainstream Rock (Billboard)	15

== Personnel ==
Band

- Chester Bennington – lead vocals
- Dean DeLeo – guitar, backing vocals
- Robert DeLeo – bass, backing vocals
- Eric Kretz – drums
