= Father figure (disambiguation) =

Father figure is a psychology term.

Father Figure may also refer to:

- "Father Figure" (George Michael song), 1987
- "Father Figure" (Army of Anyone song), 2007
- "Father Figure" (Taylor Swift song), 2025
- Father Figure (TV series), a comedy television series first broadcast in 2013
- Father Figure (1980 film), a drama film by Jerry London
- Father Figure (2017 film), a stand-up special by Roy Wood Jr.
- Father Figures, a 2017 American comedy film
- "Father Figure" (This Life), a 1996 television episode
- Father Figure (album), 2025 album by Jon Bellion
