= High Rise (EP) =

EP by Stone Temple Pilots with Chester Bennington
- Released: October 8, 2013
- Recorded: May–October 2013
- Studio: Homefry Studios
- Genre: Hard rock
- Length: 16:26
- Label: Play Pen, LLC
- Producer: Stone Temple Pilots

Stone Temple Pilots chronology
Stone Temple Pilots (2010)	High Rise (2013)	Stone Temple Pilots (2018)

Singles from High Rise
- 1. "Out of Time" Released: May 19, 2013; 2. "Black Heart" Released: September 18, 2013

High Rise is an EP by the American rock band Stone Temple Pilots, released on October 8, 2013, through their own record label Play Pen. It is the first release by the band without lead vocalist Scott Weiland, who was fired from the band in February 2013, and the only release to feature Chester Bennington of Linkin Park on lead vocals. Two singles were released to promote the EP; "Out of Time" and "Black Heart". The EP received generally mixed reviews from critics.

== Background ==
On February 27, 2013, Stone Temple Pilots fired lead vocalist Scott Weiland. Weiland responded to the firing with his own statement, "I learned of my supposed 'termination' from Stone Temple Pilots this morning by reading about it in the press. Not sure how I can be 'terminated' from a band that I founded, fronted and co-wrote many of its biggest hits, but that's something for the lawyers to figure out." He also claimed that the band had no right to perform under the Stone Temple Pilots moniker with another singer.

The firing resulted in legal action. The three remaining members (guitarist Dean DeLeo, bassist Robert DeLeo, and drummer Eric Kretz) sued Weiland to prevent him from calling himself a former member of STP. Weiland counter-sued the other three members for wrongfully attempting to fire him, for misleading the public by referring to their performances with Bennington as STP, and to dissolve the band STP. Both lawsuits were later settled out of court, allowing the Bennington-fronted band to continue using the STP name.

On May 18, 2013, Stone Temple Pilots performed their debut concert with Chester Bennington of Linkin Park on lead vocals, appearing as special guests at the 21st Annual KROQ Weenie Roast, benefiting Heal the Bay. They performed their first single with Bennington, "Out of Time." The next day, the band released a free digital download of the song via their official website. The updated website also featured new promotional pictures of the band including Bennington. Coincidentally, Bennington had exclaimed years before in interviews that being a member of Stone Temple Pilots was his lifelong dream.

Bennington said in May 2013 of new material that the band would not likely record a full-length studio album in the near future, explaining: "We don't have a label. Everything we're doing is on our own, so we're just taking it one track at a time. We would love to sit down and hammer out a record, but the reality is we're gonna make music, we're gonna make a lot of it, and we're gonna be in a position to release a single at a time, go out and really give people music the way they want to get it." This explained the band's decision to release an EP as opposed to a full album.

On October 3, 2013, Stone Temple Pilots with Chester Bennington's complete stream of the EP could be seen and heard on Pandora Radio for Pandora Premieres, including the singles "Out of Time" and "Black Heart" that were featured on the EP officially.

== Reception ==
Professional ratings
Review scores
Source	Rating
AllMusic	3.5/5 stars
Calgary Herald	2/5 stars
Consequence	D−
laut.de	4/5 stars
The Gazette	2.5/5 stars

Stephen Thomas Erlewine of AllMusic gave High Rise a favorable review, writing that "these songs are expertly sculpted, playing upon the kind of riffs and melodies that made the group alt-rock titans in the '90s, and still sounding somewhat irresistible even when they're po-faced." Montreal Gazette gave High Rise a mixed review, awarding it 2.5 out of 5 stars, stating that "High Rise gives us the springy, bass-driven songs we've come to expect from STP. But again, the results are inconsistent...basically, High Rise is almost the STP we remember."

=== Commercial performance ===
High Rise debuted at #24 on the Billboard 200, selling 13,520 copies in its first week.

"Out of Time" was used as the official theme song to WWE's Hell in a Cell professional wrestling pay-per-view event.

== Track listing ==
All songs written and composed by Chester Bennington, Dean DeLeo, Robert DeLeo and Eric Kretz.

High Rise track listing
No.	Title	Length
1.	"Out of Time"	3:04
2.	"Black Heart"	3:09
3.	"Same on the Inside"	3:15
4.	"Cry Cry"	3:28
5.	"Tomorrow"	3:30
Total length:		16:26

== Personnel ==
Band

- Chester Bennington – lead vocals
- Dean DeLeo – guitar
- Robert DeLeo – bass, backing vocals
- Eric Kretz – drums

Additional personnel

- Production by Stone Temple Pilots
- Recorded at Homefry Studios
- Recorded & Engineered by Russ Fowler
- Assistant Engineer: Jared Hirshland
- Studio Guitar Tech: Bruce Nelson
- Studio Drum Tech: Jarrett Borba
- Mixed by Ben Grosse at The Mix Room in Burbank, California
- Mix Assistant: Paul Pavao
- Mastered by Tom Baker at Baker Mastering in Calabasas, California
- Original "Check It" Image Art Work by Chester Bennington
- Band Photo by Chapman Baehler
- Layout Design by Great Daane Graphics
- Published by ChesterChaz Publishing (BMI)/Brain Tan Music (ASCAP)/I, Myself And Me (ASCAP)/Fast Fog Music (ASCAP)
- Chester Bennington appears courtesy of Warner Bros. Records

== Charts ==
Chart performance for High Rise
Chart (2013)	Peak position
US Billboard 200	24
