= Stone Temple Pilots (2010 album) =

Studio album by Stone Temple Pilots

Studio album by Stone Temple Pilots
- Released: May 21, 2010
- Recorded: 2009–2010
- Studios: Bomb Shelter Studios, Lavish Studios, and Homefry Studio in Los Angeles, California
- Genres: Grunge; alternative rock; hard rock; neo-psychedelia
- Length: 41:16
- Label: Atlantic
- Producers: Robert DeLeo, Dean DeLeo

Stone Temple Pilots chronology
Thank You (2003)	Stone Temple Pilots (2010)	High Rise (2013)

Singles from Stone Temple Pilots
- 1. "Between the Lines" Released: March 22, 2010; 2. "Take a Load Off" Released: June 15, 2010

Stone Temple Pilots is the sixth studio album by the American rock band Stone Temple Pilots. The album was released between May 21 and May 27, 2010 worldwide, and is the band's first album since 2001's Shangri-La Dee Da. The album is the result of the band's reunion, which occurred in April 2008 with their North American tour. After Stone Temple Pilots had begun playing together, the band decided to record again, but a lawsuit filed by Atlantic Records on June 12, 2008, made the sixth album an uncertainty. Atlantic eventually withdrew the lawsuit, and the band's attorney called the legal situation a "misunderstanding". The album is also the band's final release with the full original lineup, as vocalist Scott Weiland was dismissed from Stone Temple Pilots in 2013, and died in 2015. It is also their last to be released through Atlantic, as well as their last album for eight years until the release of their self-titled 2018 album.

Robert DeLeo, against Atlantic Records' wishes, insisted that he and his brother Dean DeLeo produce the record themselves, which began production in early 2009. Because recording took place during breaks in the band's touring schedule, production took nearly ten months to complete. Three studios were used simultaneously, including Robert's home studio and Eric Kretz's Bomb Shelter Studios. Scott Weiland recorded vocals at his own Lavish Studios. Don Was came in as an additional producer to help keep the band's separate recording sessions in sync, as well as to work closely with Weiland during the recording of his vocals. The album was completed in December 2009, and mixing and mastering were finished by February 2010.

The album received generally favorable reviews. Most critics agreed that Stone Temple Pilots was heavily inspired by country and rock music from the 1960s and 1970s. The band confirmed these assertions and that lyricists like Bob Dylan, and guitarists like Speedy West and Brad Whitford were influences. The album was promoted during the band's performances at music festivals and headlining concerts, as well as in interviews with music websites and magazines, including Billboard and Spin, and radio and television talk shows. "Between the Lines" was the first single, released on March 22. The second single, "Take a Load Off" and the promotional single, "Cinnamon", were released later in the year. Stone Temple Pilots sold 62,000 copies in its first week and peaked at number two on the Billboard 200.

== Background ==
After separating in 2002, Stone Temple Pilots reunited in April 2008 for a 75-date North American tour. Scott Weiland would hear new material from Robert and Dean DeLeo while the band performed sound checks during the tour, but he would not collaborate in the songwriting process until he was through promoting his solo album, "Happy" in Galoshes.

Despite the band's intent, a future album from the group was uncertain. On June 12, 2008, Atlantic Records filed a lawsuit against Weiland and Eric Kretz, claiming the two had threatened to terminate their contract unless changes were made. Stone Temple Pilots had delivered six albums (five studio records and the compilation, Thank You) and Atlantic wanted a seventh album with an option for two more. In a statement made by email, the band said they were surprised and disappointed by the lawsuit.

Stone Temple Pilots stressed that a new album would be recorded as long as both parties in the lawsuit acted in good faith, but in November 2008, Weiland would comment, "I was told, and I was told for years, that we were free from Atlantic.... I have no interest in making a record for a major label." Weiland expressed interest in exploring distribution options after the band's reformation. Commenting on his idea, he said, "[O]ther bands, they make more money doing things in an unconventional fashion as opposed to doing it... with the major labels." Dean was curious about Weiland's idea but was aware that the band was contractually obligated to release two more albums. Increasing the uncertainty in the future of a new album, Weiland added, "I'm proud of everything we've written. But to make another record would mean another couple of years of my life dedicated to that, and I just don't know if that's where I see myself going."

"There's a destiny for certain people to get together and do things, whether it's music or art or other facets of life. And that, to me, is what chemistry is about."

— Robert DeLeo, Toronto Sun

The band's attorney, Gary Stiffelman, clarified that the complaint was a result of a "misunderstanding" during contract negotiations, and a representative for Atlantic stated the lawsuit had been voluntarily dismissed. The final negotiation details between Atlantic and the band remain unknown. Weiland later clarified, "I didn't want to record for Atlantic because I didn't know anybody there anymore, except for Craig Kallman. Since then I've gotten to know Craig much better, and I've gotten to know the Atlantic staff pretty extensively."

Recording a new album was, according to Robert, a "natural progression" after the band began playing together again. "The thing that kind of introduces us back together is all those memories of the songs, and once you start playing those songs... it always takes us back to... 18 years now. It can take us back to our past and think about where we were when we were writing these songs, and that's a bond, I think, [that] will always keep us together as four people.... It just progressed into, 'Maybe it's time to make a new record.'"

== Production ==
Stone Temple Pilots marks the first time Robert and Dean have written together since Army of Anyone's only release in 2006 and also their first album to not feature their longtime producer Brendan O'Brien; some of Dean's contributions date from this period, but "Dare If You Dare" was written while Talk Show was touring. Robert and Dean began writing new material by November 2008, but, except for clips played during the tour sound checks, Weiland would not hear anything new until after February 2009. The recording process took place over a period of ten months, due largely to the band's touring schedule, but the majority of actual studio time was spent experimenting with different instruments and miking techniques. Pre-production for the album took place at Kretz's Bomb Shelter Studios and consisted mainly of Dean, Robert, and Kretz sifting through musical ideas.

"When you come off the road, everybody is playing really well, and I think it shows on these performances. Everybody is on his game."

— Dean DeLeo, ARTISTdirect.com

Robert insisted, against Atlantic Records' initial wishes, that he and Dean produce the album together. This freed the band from the constraints of any outside producer's schedule. The recording process could then be intertwined with tour dates, which, Dean said, resulted in improved performances on the record. Dean admitted they had been spoiled by working with producer Brendan O'Brien on previous releases. "I'm not so good at walking around the control room with a pen and clipboard in my hands, marking down what takes are the best. It's a lot of work. But I like being the very best I can be, and when you're producing, you are taking on everyone's performances and wanting it to be the best it can be."

The DeLeos often worked off each other when writing the songs. Robert's primary instrument for composing was the bass, and Dean complimented his achievements: "It's probably easier to tell a story through a piano or a guitar, but when [someone] can tell a story with a bass, that's pretty remarkable." Robert recognized the important roles each of the band members played in bringing his songs to life:

When I personally write a song, it's such an honor and a pleasure to give that song to these guys, because I know that song is going to be interpreted the best way possible. Everyone's going to put their imprint on that song and make that song the best STP song it can be, whether it be the playing or the arranging or the writing of everyone doing their part.... What has really been the body of our records has been that contribution of all of us as four people.

CDs were submitted to Weiland containing music in completed demo form, including scratch melodies, which Weiland had the option to use or discard. Dean did not mind when his melodies were not accepted by Weiland. "[W]hen I write a song, I know what I want it to be melodically. But Scott always... knocks my melodies out of the water." Weiland worked on the lyrics using these demo arrangements, often making suggestions for musical phrases to be doubled or moved. Weiland was credited for the lyrical melodies, but Robert pointed out, "This record was made in a way that Scott wasn't really there for the creation of these songs, musically." However, both Dean and Robert would be surprised at the direction Weiland would take the songs, which could have been composed with an entirely different vision. Robert found this to be a strength within the band. "People always have this misconception that a band all need to think alike... [There are] so many different ways of looking at songs and [how they're] put together, and that's really the beauty of a great band".

Working as an additional producer, Don Was helped keep Weiland's and the rest of the band's separate recording sessions in sync by bringing them together to perform live. When the band performed together, they would do so acoustically, so each member could hear the nuances of the songs. Weiland credited Was for helping the band learn how to play together again. Was also worked closely with Weiland during the recording of the vocals.

By June 2009, the band had written eighteen songs, twelve of which were planned to be released on the album, with B-sides for Japan, the United Kingdom, and Europe selected from the remaining songs. Recording began in early 2009, at times taking place in three studios simultaneously. Bass lines and overdubs were recorded at Homefry Studio, located in the basement of Robert's house. The majority of "Cinnamon" and "First Kiss on Mars", including drums, were recorded in Robert's home studio. Dean's guitars were recorded at Kretz's Bomb Shelter Studios, and Weiland's vocals were recorded at his Lavish Studios. By early December, nine songs had been finished, and the entire record was completed later that month. Mixing began in January 2010 with Chris Lord-Alge, and mastering for the album was completed in February by Ted Jensen at Sterling Sound. Robert described the overall feel of the album as having a " '60s vibe." Though previous albums explored new sounds, Weiland acknowledged that the new album would be a "back-to-basics rock record."

In a retrospective interview in 2017, Robert DeLeo commented that he would "never want to make a record like that again", referring to how the songwriting and recording process with the DeLeos and Kretz was kept separate from Weiland and referred to the initial vocal takes as "not satisfactory...we were doing four different versions of [the songs] to figure out what key is the best" because of communication difficulties between both parties.

== Composition ==
The music on Stone Temple Pilots was influenced by various styles, most notably country music and 1960s and 1970s rock. Various amps and vintage guitars from Dean's and Robert's personal collections were used to produce the desired sounds. Dean's guitars included two 1970s Gibson Les Pauls, a 1956 Stratocaster, three Telecasters dating between 1965 and 1966, and a 1960s double-cut Danelectro. An assortment of amps were used, including 10-, 15-, and 20-watt Valco speakers and late 1960s 18- and 20-watt Marshall combos. Robert recorded the bass lines to "First Kiss on Mars" with a 1950s six-string Danelectro Longhorn bass, and Weiland used Robert's collection of vintage microphones for some of his vocals. Dean exclaimed, "Most bands do a retro thing and apologize for it. We're unapologetically retro here. That was the whole idea!"

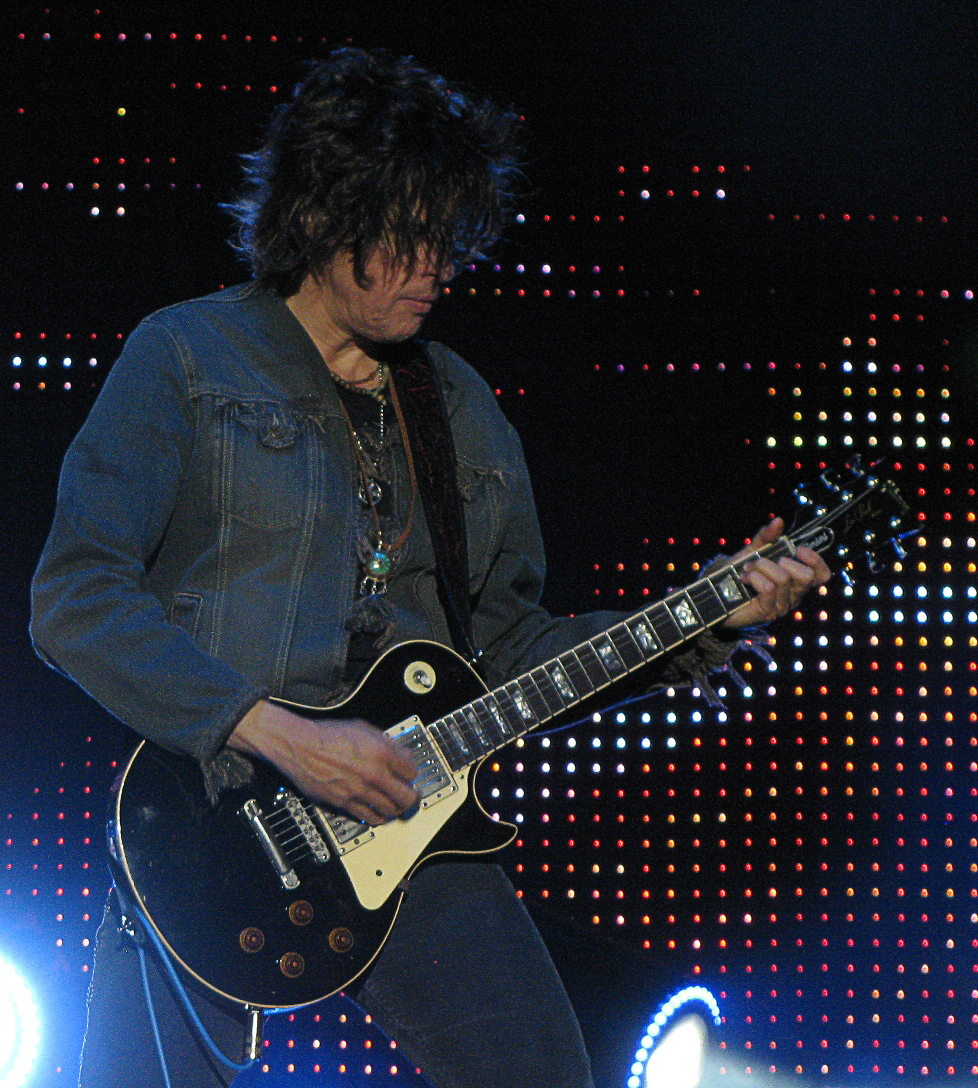
Dean DeLeo playing a Gibson Les Paul guitar

Leading up to the recording process, Dean had been listening to country, drawing inspiration from 1960s guitarists like Jimmy Bryant, Speedy West, Hank Garland, Pete Drake, Hank Snow and Aerosmith's Brad Whitford. Songs like "Hickory Dichotomy" gave Weiland and Kretz a "Down South" and "swampy kind of feeling". Although it was recorded in standard tuning, "Hickory Dichotomy" features a slide guitar solo performed in open G. Both "Cinnamon" and "Maver" were recorded with a Telecaster set up for Nashville tuning, and Dean described "First Kiss on Mars" as having a "down-home country kind of feel", but noted Weiland's influence on the song: "That title takes it to this whole other plateau."

Several of the songs were inspired by 1960s and 1970s rock bands. "Between the Lines" was written with The Animals, The Zombies and Paul Revere & the Raiders in mind, and Weiland considered "Cinnamon" to be a combination of 1960s British pop and Ian Curtis (of Joy Division). "Huckleberry Crumble" was inspired by Aerosmith, specifically "Same Old Song and Dance". Dean admitted to the similarities: "The arrangement is almost the same: riff, solo, verse, chorus, solo, back to a second verse—it's pretty much the same setup." He also noted how the song sounded different depending on the type of instruments used to play it. "It's amazing how, if you were to present that opening riff on a Tele really clean, it's almost a country riff. But if you present it with a Les Paul through a Marshall, it takes on this whole different thing."

"Cinnamon"
Weiland's lyrics were directly influenced by his relationship with his ex-wife.

"First Kiss on Mars"
Weiland's lyrics were inspired by the "intergalactic".

Weiland's lyrics were different than those on previous albums, which had been solely focused on himself and his drug addictions. He studied lyricists to learn how to write differently. "[In] the '90s, I was so overwhelmed with my heroin addiction, and so a lot of the stuff was just from my point of view. Now, I tend to look at some of the greats like Bob Dylan. I look at their storytelling [and] I try to tell stories. Every song doesn't have to be narcissistically written about how I feel on that day." Stone Temple Pilots became the third album Weiland had ever recorded sober, after Velvet Revolver's Libertad and Stone Temple Pilots’ first album, Core. Weiland was also influenced by his ex-wife, Mary Forsberg, about whom he specifically wrote on "Cinnamon". Weiland's inspiration for "First Kiss on Mars" came from the music itself. He explained his lyrics succinctly: "When I first heard [the song], it sounded intergalactic." Critics and interviewers of the band noticed that Weiland's vocalizations were drawn from David Bowie.

== Title and artwork ==
Several titles were considered before the band settled on the eponymous name. Kretz explained, "We've always tried to come up with very witty and interesting names for our records and we just felt that it was time, 18 years into the Stone Temple Pilots career, to put out a self-titled album." Robert agreed that the new title was a testament to the "new chapter" in the band's career. Weiland also felt the band was starting over and thought the music expressed this on its own. "We don't need to come up with some major conceptual title. The image on the cover and the music speak for themselves."

The album cover incorporates the artwork Peace Fingers Red, designed by Shepard Fairey. According to Kretz, "It was just something to kind of symbolize more of our attitude right now.... We definitely are in a really good place right now as a band and really want to spread some peace and love across the world as much we can. We're going to do it through music and the celebration of rock and roll." The artwork on the deluxe edition released in Target stores added gold foil to the patterns.

== Promotion and release ==
Stone Temple Pilots was promoted through various media outlets, including the Internet, radio, and on television, with live performances and interviews by the band. The earliest reported premiere of the album was on February 23, 2010, when the new album was played in its entirety at a private listening party held at Gramercy Park Hotel's Rose Bar in New York City. Among those in attendance were Stone Temple Pilots, journalists from several venues, and Craig Kallman, Chairman and CEO of Atlantic Records. Stone Temple Pilots opened an early-2010 tour on March 18 at the South by Southwest music festival, where four new songs were premiered: "Between the Lines", "Huckleberry Crumble", "Bagman", and "Hickory Dichotomy". On March 27, the band was filmed performing live at the Riviera Theatre in Chicago, Illinois. The footage appeared on VH1's Friday Night Alright series two months later on May 21, which included a performance of "Between the Lines".

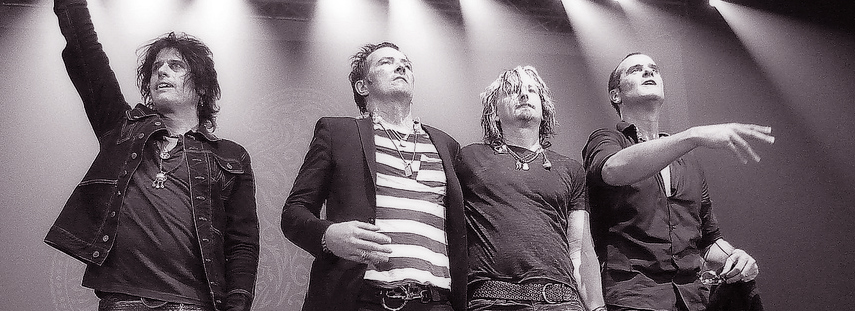
From left: Dean DeLeo, Scott Weiland, Eric Kretz, Robert DeLeo after a 2011 performance in the Philippines

Beginning in late April, Amazon.com advertised that they would be streaming a new song in its entirety each week leading up to the release of the album. Four songs total were streamed, including "Between the Lines", "Hickory Dichotomy", "Bagman", and "Huckleberry Crumble". On May 21, all twelve tracks of the album became available for streaming in their entirety on Billboard's website. That same month, the band appeared on a radio talk show and two late night television talk shows. On May 18, Stone Temple Pilots was the guest on the Howard Stern Show. The following night, May 19, Stone Temple Pilots performed "Between the Lines" on the Late Show with David Letterman. The band performed two mini-concerts for two episodes of Jimmy Kimmel Live!. The first concert was recorded at the Gramercy Theater in Manhattan, New York, and aired on the evening of May 26. The second concert was performed the following night and aired on May 27. Stone Temple Pilots became Artist of the Month for American cable television network ESPN during June, though the network began featuring the band's music during the month of May. Songs from previous releases, as well as "Fast As I Can", "Cinnamon", "Dare If You Dare", and "Take a Load Off", were played during the network's television programming and were listed on the network's website, which included links to purchase the songs.

Stone Temple Pilots was released worldwide over a period of a week. Several foreign markets released the album on May 21, including Australia, Germany, and the Netherlands. The U.S. released the album on May 25, and countries like Sweden, Finland, and Japan released the album on May 26. Different versions of the album were released, including retailer-specific versions. The standard 12-track album was released on CD and vinyl. Deluxe and Japanese versions of the album included a second disc with four bonus tracks. Target stores sold a deluxe edition version that included gold foil on the artwork and an 18-panel poster, and iTunes included a music video, an interview video, and a pre-order bonus track.

On June 1, "Between the Lines" was released, along with two other songs, as part of a Stone Temple Pilots pack for the rhythm video game Guitar Hero. On June 5, the band performed at the KROQ Weenie Roast, hosted by the U.S. radio station. For the duration of June, the band played at various festivals in Europe, beginning with the Nova Rock Festival in Nickelsdorf, Austria, on June 11 and completing on June 28 in Sesto San Giovanni, Italy. The band returned to North America to perform at the rock festival Rock on the Range in Winnipeg, Manitoba, Canada, on August 7. They launched their headline tour on August 10 at the Red Rocks Amphitheatre in Morrison, Colorado.

=== Singles ===
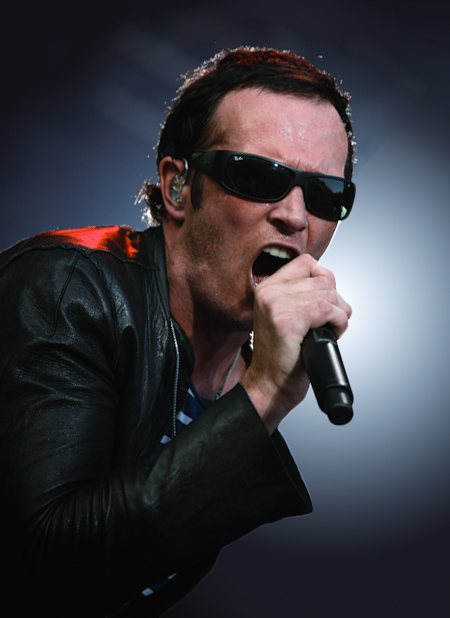
Scott Weiland singing at the St. Gallen OpenAir Festival in Switzerland.

"Between the Lines" became the album's first single; it was released digitally on the band's Twitter page on March 22, later peaking at number one on the Billboard Rock Songs chart.The music video for "Between the Lines", directed by Christopher Sims, was shot on April 11 in Los Angeles, California, and premiered on Fuse TV's Top 20 Countdown on May 7.The song was written by Robert, with a guitar solo written by Dean. Robert was inspired by the 1960s rock groups The Zombies and The Animals, and had been picturing "a '60s go-go beat and a girl in a miniskirt" before Weiland changed the song's meaning with his lyrics. Dean commented on how Weiland had turned "Between the Lines" into a love song: "Sometimes we don't feel musically what Scott does lyrically. He took it to an exciting place. It's pretty twisted." Weiland's lyrics reflected on his relationship with his ex-wife, Mary Forsberg, and his history with drug abuse. Speaking of the at-times strange lyrics, Weiland cited The Beatles' "I Am the Walrus" as an inspiration. "Sometimes you throw together random words that phonetically sound good with the melody and then you get to the meat of the song in the chorus." "Between the Lines" was originally the working title of the song, which Weiland incorporated into his lyrics.

"Take a Load Off" was the band's second single, which was released on June 15, and the accompanying music video was released in September. The video is a culmination of clips edited together, including moments with the band—both on and off stage—, samples of cartoons, and "all-American imagery". "Take a Load Off" topped the Alternative Chart at number 24.

"Cinnamon" was released as the band's third single, which debuted at number 49 on the Alternative Chart. The first music video for the song was filmed in mid-2010, directed by Aggressive (the combined efforts of directors Alex Topaller and Dan Shapiro), and produced by Anke Thommen, but the video was reshot. Kretz said simply that the first video had "the wrong director". The second music video was filmed in December 2010, directed by Dennis Roberts and photographed by Adam Bricker, however this video was also shelved in May 2011 without ever being released.

== Previews and pre-release ==
On February 23, 2010, the album was previewed in its entirety during a private listening party at Gramercy Park Hotel's Rose Bar in New York City. Craig Kallman, Chairman and CEO of Atlantic Records, delivered a speech praising the members of the band and their influence on the music industry, comparing them to Led Zeppelin. Several members of the audience described the songs as "Beatles-esque" and the album "a natural, melodic progression for Stone Temple Pilots." Robert DeLeo cautioned against the overuse of the "Beatles" label. "I think there's always going to be a sense of Beatles on whatever anybody does. I mean, the Beatles have been such a huge influence and inspiration on music in general. The Beatles, they're ingrained in everybody's mind.... The Beatles are like our nursery rhymes for all of us; it's the planet's nursery rhymes."

William Goodman of Spin described the album as a "signature blend of tuneful melodies and rock guitar crunch, psychedelic solos and impressive crooning courtesy of Scott Weiland," adding that two songs in the second half of the album were slower and performed with acoustic guitar. Rick Florino of ARTISTdirect.com extolled the album as "the rock record of the decade," calling it "a masterpiece that will officially solidify STP alongside the Beatles, Led Zeppelin and the Rolling Stones as one of the greatest rock 'n' roll bands of all time."

== Critical reception ==
Professional ratings
Aggregate scores
Source	Rating
Metacritic	70/100
Review scores
Source	Rating
AllMusic	3.5/5 stars
The A.V. Club	C−
Billboard	4.5/5 stars
Entertainment Weekly	B+
IGN	6.5/10
Los Angeles Times	2.5/4 stars
PopMatters	6/10
Rolling Stone	3.5/5 stars
Sputnikmusic	2.5/5 stars
USA Today	3/4 stars

Stephen Thomas Erlewine of AllMusic suggested that Stone Temple Pilots proved the band members, after nearly a decade of side-projects, needed each other. The album's sound picked up where Shangri-La Dee Da left off, but the lack of Brendan O'Brien's production, which Erlewine believed was a "key ingredient" to the previous albums, was evident. "[W]ith another set of ears in the studio... perhaps the entire set would be sharpened." Jon Dolan's brief review in Entertainment Weekly called the music "cheap and easy pop-rock mimicry". He noted that Weiland sounded "effervescent" now that the singer was drug-free, but Dolan still found his lyrics to "weigh him down".

Brad Wheeler, writing for The Globe and Mail, wondered if the eponymous title was an allusion to the Atlantic Records contractual dispute. He went on to remark on the music's combination of 90s era "guitar flash and crunch" and The Beatles. Wheeler did not think the album moved the band or its sound forward, calling it "a quasi-comeback album that neither defiles nor builds upon the band's legend." Amirose Eisenbach of IGN wrote that the music was not "anything especially unique". Eisenbach analyzed several tracks, observing that some songs "start off promising" only to result in "uninspired, generic hooks," while other songs struggle with their musical direction. Despite this, Eisenbach felt the album had "enough going on inside the album's 41 minutes that it's worth a listen."

Newsday's Glenn Gamboa praised the band for "not reliving the past", but he found enough similarities to the band's previous releases to appeal to listeners. He considered the album successful because the band had been "reflecting their time apart and their work with Velvet Revolver and Army of Anyone." Mike Schiller, writing for PopMatters, called the album's title an appropriate fit with the band's apparent ease of writing with "obvious" influences. He described the title as, "more homage than it is subconscious plagiarism," before listing Nirvana, Aerosmith, Joy Division, John Lennon, David Bowie, and even the band's Purple as having intentionally shaped the album. Schiller decided the album was a "bonus" because, in the near-decade gap since the band's last release, "people have moved on". He concluded that Stone Temple Pilots is "a far more fitting epilogue" than the last album, before considering it, "perhaps, [the] next chapter".

Ronnie Kerswell of Rock Sound said that the album "does not disappoint", describing it as having "heady guitar trips and crunching grooves". She found Weiland's voice to be improved in part due to his sober lifestyle and wrote that the band was "back in action". USA Today's Jerry Schriver praised the band for releasing a "cohesive, self-produced reunion album", but admitted the tracks were not "timeless". The songs were found to be "pleasant" but "disposable" and inoffensive. Schriver commended Dean DeLeo for keeping the "well-constructed tunes" moving forward, despite Weiland's lyrics. Allison Stewart, writing for The Washington Post, decided the album was a "small victory" and "respectable" but ultimately "a weirdly mild, tension-free outing." Like other critics, Stewart noticed the influences on the album, including country and "psych-rock", and thought the band was "better at mixing their influences in novel ways than at actually being novel themselves."

== Commercial performance ==
Stone Temple Pilots peaked at number two on the Billboard 200 chart, selling 61,933 copies its first week. The album was prevented from reaching number one by the television soundtrack Glee: The Music, Volume 3 Showstoppers. The album dropped to number 16 in its second week and to number 45 in its third week. The album also peaked at number one on Billboard's Hard Rock and Rock Albums charts. The album reached the top 10 in two countries, Canada (number two) and New Zealand (number six); the top 40 in three countries, Australia (number 21), Finland (number 35) and Switzerland (number 36); and the top 100 in numerous other countries. Sales for the album dropped 70% in its second week, selling 18,601 copies, and continued to drop another 44% in its third week, selling 10,473 copies. The fourth week saw sales drop 18%, with 8,538 copies sold.

== Track listing ==
All lyrics are written by Scott Weiland.

Stone Temple Pilots track listing
No.	Title	Music	Length
1.	"Between the Lines"	Robert DeLeo	2:50
2.	"Take a Load Off"	Dean DeLeo	3:11
3.	"Huckleberry Crumble"	R. DeLeo	3:10
4.	"Hickory Dichotomy"	D. DeLeo	3:22
5.	"Dare If You Dare"	D. DeLeo	4:29
6.	"Cinnamon"	R. DeLeo	3:33
7.	"Hazy Daze"	R. DeLeo, D. DeLeo	2:59
8.	"Bagman"	D. DeLeo	2:45
9.	"Peacoat"	D. DeLeo	3:29
10.	"Fast as I Can"	D. DeLeo	3:33
11.	"First Kiss on Mars"	R. DeLeo	3:03
12.	"Maver"	R. DeLeo	4:52
Total length:			41:16

Bonus tracks
No.	Title	Music	Length
13.	"Samba Nova"	R. DeLeo	3:33
14.	"Vasoline" (live from Chicago)	R. DeLeo, D. DeLeo, Weiland, Eric Kretz	3:10
15.	"Hickory Dichotomy" (live from Chicago)	D. DeLeo	3:18
16.	"Between the Lines" (live from Chicago)	R. DeLeo	2:55

iTunes deluxe edition
No.	Title	Length
17.	"Between the Lines" (music video)	3:02
18.	"Stone Temple Pilots Interview" (video)	14:56
19.	"About a Fool" (pre-order only)	3:43

== Personnel ==
=== Stone Temple Pilots ===
- Scott Weiland – lead vocals
- Robert DeLeo – bass, backing vocals
- Dean DeLeo – guitars
- Eric Kretz – drums

Additional musicians

- Bill Appleberry – keyboards

=== Production ===
- Stone Temple Pilots – production
- Chris Lord-Alge – mixing
- Don Was – additional producion
- Ted Jensen – mastering
- Russ Fowler – engineer
- Bill Appleberry – engineer, keyboards
- Doug Grean – engineer
- Mike Gerlach – assistant engineer
- Jared Hirshland – assistant engineer
- Arik Garcia – assistant engineer
- Keith Armstrong – assistant mixer
- Nik Karpen – assistant mixer
- Brad Townsend – additional engineering
- Andrew Schubert – additional engineering
- Shepard Fairey – cover image
- Mark Obriski – art direction & design
- David J. Harrigan III – additional design
- Chapman Baehler – photography
- Dana DuFine – management

== Charts ==
Chart (2010)	Peak position
Australian Albums (ARIA)	21
Austrian Albums (Ö3 Austria)	54
Belgian Albums (Ultratop Flanders)	105
Belgian Albums (Ultratop Wallonia)	155
Canadian Albums (Billboard)	2
Finnish Albums (Suomen virallinen lista)	35
German Albums (Offizielle Top 100)	52
Greek Albums (IFPI)	10
Italian Albums (FIMI)	83
Mexican Albums (Top 100 Mexico)	80
New Zealand Albums (RMNZ)	6
Scottish Albums (Official Charts)	62
Spanish Albums (Promusicae)	91
Swiss Albums (Schweizer Hitparade)	36
UK Albums (Official Charts)	80
UK Album Downloads (Official Charts)	97
UK Rock & Metal Albums (Official Charts)	4
US Billboard 200	2
US Digital Albums (Billboard)	2
US Top Rock Albums (Billboard)	1
US Top Hard Rock Albums (Billboard)	1

Chart (2025)	Peak position
Hungarian Physical Albums (MAHASZ)	29

== Release history ==
Region	Date	Format	Refs
Australia	May 21, 2010	CD, digital download	
Germany	May 21, 2010	CD, digital download	
Netherlands	May 21, 2010	CD, digital download	
United Kingdom	May 24, 2010	CD, digital download	
New Zealand	May 24, 2010	CD, digital download	
United States	May 25, 2010	CD, vinyl, digital download	
Canada	May 25, 2010	CD, vinyl, digital download	
Norway	May 25, 2010	CD, digital download	
Sweden	May 26, 2010	CD, digital download	
Finland	May 26, 2010	CD, digital download	
Japan	May 26, 2010	CD, digital download	
Brazil	May 27, 2010	CD, digital download	
