= The Trouble with Angels (Filter album) =

Studio album by Filter
- Released: August 17, 2010
- Recorded: 2008–2010
- Genres: Industrial rock; industrial metal; alternative metal; post-grunge
- Length: 41:04 (standard); 66:18 (deluxe)
- Labels: Rocket Science Ventures; Nuclear Blast
- Producers: Richard Patrick; Bob Marlette

Filter chronology
The Very Best Things (1995–2008) (2009)	The Trouble with Angels (2010)	The Sun Comes Out Tonight (2013)

Singles from The Trouble with Angels
- 1. "Fades Like a Photograph" Released: October 21, 2009; 2. "The Inevitable Relapse" Released: May 26, 2010; 3. "No Love" Released: November 9, 2010

The Trouble with Angels is the fifth studio album by American rock band Filter. It was released on August 17, 2010, by Rocket Science Ventures in North America and Nuclear Blast in Europe. The first single from the album, "The Inevitable Relapse", was released for free on the band's official website on May 26, 2010. The album debuted at number 64 on Billboard's Top 200, selling 6,300 copies.

== History ==
Filter started working on a fifth album shortly after the release of the remix and greatest hits albums, with Bob Marlette as a producer. The album, as said by Richard Patrick, would be a lot heavier than Anthems for the Damned and is to have a song written for The Amalgamut on it. In an interview for the album, Patrick confirmed that song to be "Drug Boy". He also stated he would be moving away from the political lyrical content present in Anthems for the Damned. When asked about the direction of the music style in an interview with Suicide Girls on September 13, 2008, Patrick said, "...is actually way more heavy industrial, more electronic. There's probably not going to be that many live drums on it."

Through the end of 2009 and into 2010, Filter released a series of fourteen studio updates chronicling the progress made on the album. Each update touched on a certain part of the album process, such as "recording guitar parts" or "mixing the album". The last studio updates confirmed that the album recording had been completed.

The official track listing was later announced. The album features an alternative version of "Fades Like a Photograph", a song that had previously been released in 2009 for the 2012 movie soundtrack. The track now has the added appendix of (Dead Angel) and could be considered a remix of the original.

During this recording of the album, various interviews and studio updates mentioned a number of other song titles. "My Life Before" ended up being part of the "Deluxe Edition" of the album. It is unknown if the song titles "Tried to Trust", and "Cutter", were renamed, or if they were left off the album.

== Music and lyrics ==
Patrick has commented on the meanings and inspirations for a number of the songs he put on the album. The title track, "The Trouble with Angels", actually originates from Patrick's thoughts about Galileo, stating "When Galileo discovered the telescope and he noticed the planets weren't revolving around the earth, they were revolving around the sun, that went against the church and they turned it in to the inquisition imprisoned him. That's the trouble with angels, he was holding back, the church was holding back scientific discoveries because it went against what they were talking about. In life there's a dichotomy to every situation, you would think that angels are good, but for Galileo and the rest of science, not so good." The number "m400" on the cover artwork stands for "minus 400" and also refers to the 400th anniversary of the Galileo affair.

"Drug Boy" was written about his past antics during the time period he was a member of Nine Inch Nails, involving drugs and staying out all night. "Catch a Falling Knife" was inspired by the kidnapping of Jaycee Lee Dugard, who was kept in captivity for 18 years. The chorus to "The Inevitable Relapse" was a chant he used to actually use when using drugs in the past. "Down with Me" tells a story similar to a murder/suicide."

== Reception ==
Professional ratings
Aggregate scores
Source	Rating
Metacritic	69/100
Review scores
Source	Rating
411mania	9/10
All Knowing Force	(favorable)
AllMusic	3/5 stars
Metal Forge	9/10
ReGen	3/5 stars
Rock Sound	7/10
Starpulse	A
Type3media	8/10

Reception of the album was generally positive. The NewReview gave the album a 4.5 out of 5 and stated "The Trouble With Angels can best be described as a combination of the hammering juggernauts Short Bus and The Amalgamut wrapped in the catchiness of Title of Record. Some people say that it's nearly impossible for a band to rewrite history after experiencing huge success and then fading. But with this album, Filter haven't rewritten history; they have grabbed it by the neck and are choking the very life out of it." CWG stated that the album was "a majestic, transcendent rock album filled with urgency and commitment" and commended the album on its "consistent excellence". All Knowing Force also praised the album, stating "It's an amazing accomplishment for Richard Patrick and a real treat for Filter's core fanbase who might've thought the band had gotten slightly off track with 2008's Anthems for the Damned. This record is a defining moment for Filter." Ology dismissed the album, claiming that it "is the same tired, heavy metal with a sensitive heart slop that's dominated mainstream rock radio for more than a decade."

== Track listing ==
All lyrics are written by Richard Patrick.

No.	Title	Music	Length
1.	"The Inevitable Relapse"	Patrick, Bob Marlette, Mika Fineo, John Spiker	3:30
2.	"Drug Boy"	Patrick, Marlette, Mitchell Marlow	3:47
3.	"Absentee Father"	Patrick, Marlette, Fineo, Spiker	3:59
4.	"No Love"	Patrick, Marlette, Marlow	4:20
5.	"No Re-Entry"	Patrick, Marlette	5:40
6.	"Down with Me"	Patrick, Marlette, Marlow	3:53
7.	"Catch a Falling Knife"	Patrick, Marlette	4:03
8.	"The Trouble with Angels"	Marlette	3:53
9.	"Clouds"	Patrick, Marlette, Marlow	3:33
10.	"Fades Like a Photograph (Dead Angel)"	Patrick, Harold Kloser, Thomas Wander	4:24
Total length:			41:04

US deluxe edition bonus tracks
No.	Title	Music	Length
11.	"The Inevitable Relapse" (Clayton Worbeck mix)	Patrick, Marlette, Fineo, Spiker	4:33
12.	"Drowning"	Patrick, Marlette, John 5	4:11
13.	"Shot from the Sun"	Patrick, Marlette, Phil Buckman, Rob Patterson	3:51
14.	"My Life Before"	Patrick, Marlette	5:29
15.	"Plume"	Patrick	7:07
Total length:			66:18

LP and European deluxe edition bonus tracks
No.	Title	Length
11.	"Leaving Without a Note"	4:03
12.	"Drug Boy" (Club remix)	3:36
Total length:		48:43

== Personnel ==
Filter

- Richard Patrick – vocals, guitar, programming
- Mika Fineo – drums
- Mitchell Marlow – guitar
- John Spiker – bass, guitar, programming

Additional personnel

- Bob Marlette – producer, mixing, engineer, keyboards, sound design
- John Spiker – Protools editing, additional engineering
- Chris Marlette – assistant engineer
- Mitchell Marlow – additional engineering
- Nicolas Essig – assistant drum engineer
- Ted Jensen – mastering
- Yogi Lonich – guitar
- Bruce Somers – sound design, programming
- Rae Dileo – sound design, programming
- Brian Liesegang – sound design, programming
- Deborah Norcross – art direction, design, illustration
- Chapman Baehler – photography
- Brian Porizek – Pop-up CD Packaging system design

== Charts ==
Chart (2010)	Peak position
US Billboard 200	64
US Independent Albums (Billboard)	12
US Top Alternative Albums (Billboard)	12
US Top Hard Rock Albums (Billboard)	7
US Top Rock Albums (Billboard)	24
