= What Do You Say (Filter song) =

Single by Filter

from the album The Sun Comes Out Tonight
- Released: April 2, 2013
- Recorded: Blue Room Studio in Los Angeles
- Genre: Industrial rock; alternative rock
- Length: 3:48
- Label: Wind-up
- Songwriters: Richard Patrick, Jonathan Radtke and Bob Marlette
- Producer: Bob Marlette

Filter singles chronology
"No Love" (2010)	"What Do You Say" (2013)	"Surprise" (2013)

What Do You Say is the first single from rock band Filter's sixth studio album The Sun Comes Out Tonight. The track was first released on April 2, 2013, and peaked at no. 15 on the Billboard Active Rock charts.

== Background ==
The song was written and recorded by Filter frontman Richard Patrick, guitarist Jonathan Radke, and producer Bob Marlette in Los Angeles at Blue Room studios.

The song was first released as a single on April 2, 2013, two months before its respective album, The Sun Comes Out Tonight, was released on June 4, 2013. The song received two music videos; one a "lyrics video" on April 28, 2013, and one an actual music video, release at the same time of the album's release.

== Sound and composition ==
"What Do You Say" is typically classified as industrial rock, containing heavy, distorted, electric guitar, and aggressive, distorted vocals". The album's drumming consists entirely of a programmed drum machine, not a live drummer. The song maintains a verse–chorus form with an alternating quiet to loud dynamic. Lyrically, the track focuses on Patrick's perception that no one is listening to his frustrations with the world around him. He states "it’s about how everyone’s screaming at each other and not listening."

== Reception ==
The song has been relatively well received. Commercially, it is Filter's first song to chart since 2008's "Soldiers of Misfortune", and the highest-charting song since 2002's "Where Do We Go From Here?". Music critics praised the song. Several critics compared it favorably to their 1995 hit "Hey Man, Nice Shot". Hit the Floor praised the song for "exercising an enthusiastic stomp. When Patrick steps up to bellow the first choruses, eyebrows raise...this is actually good, head-nodding rock music, produced to a high standard. San Francisco Media praised Radke's guitar-work on the track and stated that the song "...just throws a mean right hook and reeks of awesomeness, tipping a nod to the Filter sound of old with something magical going on." Revolver stated that the track was especially effective when its energy and angst was contrasted with some of the album's slower, softer songs, such as "Surprise". Broken Records Magazine supported the track's choice as a single citing that the chorus sounds like it was "tailor-made to be sung by the audience live." Blabbermouth strongly praised the song as well, stating that "the throbbing pulse of "What Do You Say"...deserve[s] FM love" due to being "chocked full of rallying "whoa-oh" calls, cruise-minded pound rhythms and singular guitar shoves", ultimately concluding that it was "of Richard Patrick's most poised vehicles in quite some time".

== Personnel ==
Band

- Richard Patrick – lead vocals, guitar
- Jonathan Radtke – guitar, backing vocals

Other

- Bob Marlette – producer
- Chris Lord-Alge – mixing

== Chart performance ==
Chart (2013)	Peak position
Billboard Active Rock	15
US Billboard Hot Mainstream Rock Tracks	16
