= Father Figure (Army of Anyone song) =

2007 single by Army of Anyone

Single by Army of Anyone

from the album Army of Anyone
- Released: March 1, 2007
- Recorded: 2005–2006
- Studio: The Village Studio, Santa Monica
- Genre: Rock
- Length: 4:04
- Label: The Firm
- Songwriter(s): Richard Patrick
- Producer(s): Bob Ezrin

Army of Anyone singles chronology
"Goodbye" (2006)	"Father Figure" (2007)

"Father Figure" is a song by American rock band Army of Anyone. It was their second single off of their album Army of Anyone, and the last single the band would release before going into a hiatus mid-2007. It peaked at number 31 on the US Billboard Mainstream Rock Songs chart in April 2007.

== Background ==
"Father Figure" was first released in November 2006, as the ninth track on Army of Anyone's first and only studio album, Army of Anyone. The song was later announced and released as the second single off of Army of Anyone in March 2007 and spent seven weeks on the US Billboard Mainstream Rock Songs chart, peaking at number 31 in April 2007. This was less than the first single, "Goodbye", which had peaked at number three on the same chart the prior December.

== Themes and composition ==
Unlike most of the song's on the Army of Anyone album, which feature lyrics by Richard Patrick and music written by varying combinations of Dean DeLeo and Robert DeLeo, "Father Figure" is the only track to be lyrically and musically written entirely by Patrick. As such, the track was noted for having more similarities to Patrick's heavier industrial metal main band, Filter, than the rest of the album. Patrick wrote the song on a heavier sounding Fender Bass VI baritone guitar he had used previously while creating Filter music., leading music journalists to describe the song as having more of metal music sound, being described as "grinding" and "metallic". Despite Patrick writing the entirety of the song, Dean DeLeo and Robert DeLeo still perform the song's guitar and bass guitar parts on the song. Robert DeLeo, however, played a different bass guitar on the track than he had on the rest of the album, a Schecter eight string bass guitar, to better match the song's desired sound. The Houston Press also noted a more industrial rock sound, comparable to Filter's song "Hey Man Nice Shot". Patrick himself described his vocal takes as having a "raspy intensity", with yelling the vocals in a similar manner to how he sang in some of Filter's heavier metal songs, such as "Welcome to the Fold". Drummer Ray Luzier's performance was described as having a tribal beat.

== Reception ==
The single was identified as a standout track from the Army of Anyone album from music journalists from PopMatters and Contact Music.

== Personnel ==
Army of Anyone

- Richard Patrick – vocals
- Dean DeLeo – guitar
- Robert DeLeo – bass
- Ray Luzier – drums

Production

- Bob Ezrin – producer
- Ken Andrews – mix engineer

== Charts ==
Chart (2017)	Peak position
US Mainstream Rock (Billboard)	31
