= Ten Inch Men =

American rock band

Ten Inch Men, 1993

Ten Inch Men was an American rock band formed in 1983 in Long Beach, California by record producer Dana M Allen on his Obelisk Records label. Original band members consisted of Dave Coutts (vocals, guitar), Jim Schumacher (keyboards, vocals), Mark Templin (guitar), Rusty Riopelle (bass), and Steve Coutts (drums).

Although the original band never got signed to a major label, their music was well accepted within the college communities. Their 1984 12" single "Good for the Soul" received heavy rotation and made it to No. 3 on radio station KNAC, Long Beach. In March 1984, Ten Inch Men performed their first stadium size show at Long Beach State, opening for the punk band X. Between 1984 and 1985, several unreleased live shows and studio recordings were recorded. Spin-off videos were created from the songs "Eyes Of Blue", "High Society" and "Pink Champage"; all three aired briefly on a local Long Beach cable station. In 1986, Ten Inch Men released their four-song EP Hours in Pain containing the original recordings of "Flower Power", "Bars Of Time", "Brick Wall" and "New Eyes". "Flower Power" became their signature song & made it to No. 1 in New York City with light to medium airplay on many college radio stations across the country.

Late in 1986, the original members parted ways, creating a void until Dave Coutts, Mark Templin & Steve Coutts brought in Lisa Marie Presley's first husband Danny Keough to play bass. This lineup remained until the band's 1993 Victory release Pretty Vultures. John McCloy played bass on the record Pretty Vultures as well as toured with the band after its release.

After the band's final disbandment in 1993, Mark Templin married Carrie Hamilton, the daughter of Joe Hamilton and Carol Burnett, and former Ten Inch Men singer Dave Coutts joined members of the Stone Temple Pilots to create the band Talk Show, who released their eponymously named album in 1997. Despite Dave Coutts being regarded as an excellent rock music vocalist, and solid album reviews, the release did not do well commercially. Talk Show disbanded in early 1998.

== Discography ==
=== Albums ===
- Pretty Vultures (1993)

=== Singles ===
- "My Arms Are Wide Open" (1984)
- "Good for the Soul" (1984)
- "Flower Power" (1986)
- "Mellow Yellow" (1986)
- "Crazy Day Dream" (1993)
- "Never Say Hello" (1993)
- "Beautiful" (1994)
