= Stone Temple Pilots (2018 album) =

Studio album by Stone Temple Pilots

Studio album by Stone Temple Pilots
- Released: March 16, 2018
- Studios: HOMeFRY Studios (Los Angeles, California); Bomb Shelter Studios (South Pasadena, California)
- Genres: Alternative rock; hard rock
- Length: 48:18
- Label: Rhino
- Producer: Stone Temple Pilots

Stone Temple Pilots chronology
High Rise (2013)	Stone Temple Pilots (2018)	Perdida (2020)

Singles from Stone Temple Pilots
- 1. "Meadow" Released: November 15, 2017; 2. "Roll Me Under" Released: January 31, 2018

Stone Temple Pilots (sometimes informally referred to as The Butterfly Album) is the seventh studio album by the American rock band Stone Temple Pilots, released on March 16, 2018, through Rhino. It is the band's first with lead singer Jeff Gutt, who joined the band in 2017, and the second self-titled studio album released by the band, following their 2010 album.

The album is the band's first release since the deaths of original vocalist Scott Weiland and second vocalist Chester Bennington, both of whom are remembered in the liner notes.

The first single from the album, "Meadow", was released on November 15, 2017. A second single, "Roll Me Under", was released on January 31, 2018, to announce the album's release and the band's 2018 tour. A third single from the album, "The Art of Letting Go", was released on February 22, 2018, and a fourth single, "Never Enough", was released on March 8, 2018.

== Critical reception ==
Professional ratings
Aggregate scores
Source	Rating
Metacritic	63/100
Review scores
Source	Rating
AllMusic	3.5/5 stars
Consequence	C−
Drowned In Sound	7/10
Kerrang!	3/5 stars
laut.de	3/5 stars
Newsday	2.5/4 stars
PopMatters	5/10
Q	3/5 stars
Record Collector	3/5 stars
The Times	2/5 stars

According to the review aggregator Metacritic, Stone Temple Pilots received "generally favorable reviews" based on a weighted average score of 63 out of 100 from eight critic scores.

Stephen Thomas Erlewine of AllMusic gave a favorable review of the album, stating that it "shows they haven't lost their knack for hooky-heavy hard rock" and "certainly opens the door on another act in their career."

In a more mixed review, Chris Connaton of PopMatters praised new lead singer Gutt while criticizing the album as derivative and unadventurous, writing that "Gutt belts it out, rasps, and croons like Weiland before him" despite the band "not [being] interested in taking chances on this record."

== Track listing ==
Stone Temple Pilots track listing
No.	Title	Writer(s)	Length
1.	"Middle of Nowhere"	Dean DeLeo, Robert DeLeo, Jeff Gutt, and Eric Kretz	3:40
2.	"Guilty"	R. DeLeo, D. DeLeo, Gutt, Kretz	3:14
3.	"Meadow"	R. DeLeo, D. DeLeo, Gutt, Kretz	3:28
4.	"Just a Little Lie"	D. DeLeo, R. DeLeo, Gutt, Kretz	4:00
5.	"Six Eight"	R. DeLeo, D. DeLeo, Gutt, Kretz	3:32
6.	"Thought She'd Be Mine"	D. DeLeo, R. DeLeo, Gutt, Kretz	5:30
7.	"Roll Me Under"	R. DeLeo, D. DeLeo, Gutt, Kretz	3:45
8.	"Never Enough"	R. DeLeo, D. DeLeo, Gutt, Kretz	3:46
9.	"The Art of Letting Go"	D. DeLeo, R. DeLeo, Gutt, Kretz	4:35
10.	"Finest Hour"	D. DeLeo, R. DeLeo, Gutt, Kretz	4:10
11.	"Good Shoes"	D. DeLeo, R. DeLeo, Gutt, Kretz	3:38
12.	"Reds & Blues"	R. DeLeo, D. DeLeo, Gutt, Kretz	5:00
Total length:			48:18

Japanese edition bonus track
No.	Title	Writer(s)	Length
13.	"Already Gone"	D. DeLeo, R. DeLeo, Gutt, Kretz	3:00
Total length:			51:18

Best Buy bonus tracks
No.	Title	Writer(s)	Length
13.	"Already Gone"	D. DeLeo, R. DeLeo, Gutt, Kretz	3:00
14.	"Forget Forever"		3:23
Total length:			54:41

== Personnel ==
Stone Temple Pilots

- Dean DeLeo – guitar, production
- Robert DeLeo – bass, backing vocals, production
- Eric Kretz – drums, percussion
- Jeff Gutt – lead vocals, backing vocals

Production and design

- Stone Temple Pilots – production
- Ryan Williams – recording, engineering
- Russ Fowler – engineering on "Thought She'd Be Mine"
- Ken Andrews – mixing
- Dave Cooley – mastering
- Hans Bruechle – cover art
- Michelle Shiers – photography

== Charts ==
Chart (2018)	Peak position
Australian Albums (ARIA)	38
Belgian Albums (Ultratop Flanders)	105
Belgian Albums (Ultratop Wallonia)	155
Canadian Albums (Billboard)	36
German Albums (Offizielle Top 100)	94
Japanese Albums (Oricon)	105
Swiss Albums (Schweizer Hitparade)	44
US Billboard 200	24
