= Goodbye (Army of Anyone song) =

Single by Army of Anyone

from the album Army of Anyone
- Released: October 3, 2006
- Recorded: 2005–2006
- Studio: The Village Studio, Santa Monica
- Genre: Hard rock
- Length: 4:31
- Label: The Firm
- Songwriters: Richard Patrick; Robert DeLeo; Dean DeLeo
- Producer: Bob Ezrin

Army of Anyone singles chronology
"Goodbye" (2006)	"Father Figure" (2007)

"Goodbye" is a song by American rock band Army of Anyone. It was their first single off their only studio Army of Anyone. It peaked at number three on the Billboard Mainstream Rock Songs chart in 2006.

== Background ==
"Goodbye" was the last song written for the band's debut, and only, studio album, Army of Anyone, with vocalist Richard Patrick feeling that the album had too many mid-tempo songs, and that a more up-tempo song was needed to mix things up. Guitarist Dean DeLeo estimated that the song was written in approximately five minutes. The song was released as the album's first single on July 28, 2006, The band shot a music video for the song the following month, with it later making its debut on October 3, 2006. The video was directed by Scott Speer, who had previous directed the video for rock band Switchfoot's single "Stars". The video mostly consists of footage of the band performing the song for many different, rapidly changing camera views. The band noted the video to be a challenge, as it had been the first time the four had ever performed together publicly, and it was done both in front of cameras, and in front a large crowd of people who had been invited through an internet survey. A separate, "Behind the Scenes/Making of" video was released online as well. A special download of the song was made available for Halloween 2006, where, when the song was purchased on iTunes, the buyer would also receive a free download of the music video, and a podcast, with band interviews discussing "Goodbye" and the rest of the tracks from the Army of Anyone album. The song performed well on rock radio, peaking at number three on the US Billboard Mainstream Rock Songs chart.

The band debuted the song live on September 20, 2006. The song was performed three time on live, national television: The Tonight Show with Jay Leno on November 10, Late Night With Conan O'Brien on November 20, and Last Call with Carson Daly on November 23.

== Themes and composition ==
Lyrically, Richard Patrick described the song as being about the death of a number of people close to him at the time:

"It's a song about loss and dealing with the ending of things, you know, how everybody has to go through that at some point in their life. "I've lost a lot of friends lately. I don't know what's going on. And there's a full range of emotions that go behind it, like grief and then just anger, and then you feel sad and just kind of dealing with that".

Patrick also revealed the song was influenced by his 2002 stint in drug rehab, and the people around him that he had lost to the drug addiction he had overcome himself.

Musically, AllMusic described the song as having a huge rock, guitar-driven sound that Bob Ezrin, the music producer the band had worked with, was known for. While mostly guitar, bass, and drum driven, a keyboard part plays in the background in the bridge and outro.

== Reception ==
PopMatters singled out "Goodbye" as one of two highlights on the Army of Anyone album.

== Personnel ==
Army of Anyone

- Richard Patrick – vocals
- Dean DeLeo – guitar
- Robert DeLeo – bass
- Ray Luzier – drums

Production

- Bob Ezrin – producer
- Ken Andrews – mix engineer

== Charts ==
Chart (2017)	Peak position
US Mainstream Rock (Billboard)	3
US Modern Rock (Billboard)	21
