= The Sun Comes Out Tonight =

Studio album by Filter
- Released: June 4, 2013
- Recorded: 2012–2013
- Genre: Alternative rock; industrial rock; post-grunge
- Length: 45:43
- Label: Wind-up
- Producer: Richard Patrick; Bob Marlette

Filter chronology
The Trouble with Angels (2010)	The Sun Comes Out Tonight (2013)	Crazy Eyes (2016)

Singles from The Sun Comes Out Tonight
- 1. "What Do You Say" Released: April 2, 2013; 2. "Surprise" Released: September 24, 2013

The Sun Comes Out Tonight is the sixth studio album by American rock band Filter. The album was released on June 4, 2013. Originally announced as Gurney and the Burning Books and intended for independent release in mid-2012, the band would later sign to major record label Wind-up Records, leading to them to delay and rename the release.

== Background ==
=== Planned indie release as Gurney ===
Frontman and lead singer Richard Patrick first discussed working on a new music as early as 2011, when he referred to plans of a two album project. He originally envisioned having the first album, Gurney be stylistically be "the follow-up to Short Bus", being "angry" and "unrefined", and the second album afterwards, Burning the Books, would be next "natural progression" of a Filter album. By early 2012, the plans had consolidated into a single album of similar ideals, combining the sound of Short Bus, with the variety and progression of their second album, Title of Record. Patrick's plan included avoiding signing to a major record label, in favor of releasing it independently, by mid-2012, under the title of Gurney and the Burning Books.

Patrick started work on writing the album in early 2012, with guitarist Jonny Radtke (previously of Kill Hannah), who had joined Filter in 2011 as the touring guitarist to support their prior album The Trouble with Angels. As of March 2012, seven of the album's songs had been written, including the track "Take That Knife Out of My Back", which Patrick stated is very similar to "Hey Man, Nice Shot". Patrick and Radke entered the studio to start recording the album in April 2012. Bob Marlette, who worked with Patrick on The Trouble with Angels, also returned as a producer. However, Patrick announced that past members, drummer Mike Fineo and bassist Phil Buckman, would not be working with the band on this album, stating "It was time for a change for us. Filter is not a band, it’s a project.”

=== Change in record label and name ===
In September 2012, contrary to prior plans announced, Patrick announced that the band had signed to Wind-up Records and had tentatively moved the album's release back to May 2013. He also revealed that the touring band for promoting the album would include Buckman again on bass, alongside Jeff Friedl and Elias Mallin splitting drum duties. On March 18, 2013, the band announced the album had been retitled as The Sun Comes Out Tonight, released the official track list, and released the opening track, "We Hate It When You Get What You Want" for free download. The first single off the new album, "What Do You Say" was released on April 2, 2013.

== Composition and themes ==
Patrick planned on the album sounding harder and more aggressive than previous albums. Part of this is credited to including more screamed vocals, and heavier Drop C and Drop B guitar tunings. Patrick aimed for the album to sound like "...something that was exactly like Short Bus (Filter’s 1995 release) but done in today’s world with today’s technology". Patrick approached its creation in a similar manner to Short Bus as well; Short Bus was created entirely by Patrick and Brian Liesegang and a drum machine, where as The Sun Comes Out Night was created entirely by Patrick, Radke, and a drum machine. Patrick stated that he and Radke would typically write the raw ideas, and then Marlette would help them refine them into their finished form. Patrick completed the entire album with a drum machine; he contemplated adding a live drummer in at the end, but to keep it entirely electronic after seeing a documentary on rock and roll that insisted that band use live drums, and feeling challenged to prove it wrong.

Thematically, the album's lyrics are based on Patrick's feeling of betrayal and anger in his personal life. Resentment of worldly issues also inspired lyrics, with Patrick being angered by Sandy Hook Elementary School shooting, political discourse regarding President Barack Obama and the Tea Party movement, and an incident regarding his wife being almost run off the road by someone throwing trash at her car over a bumper sticker. Another source of inspiration both the lyrics and album title was Patrick's prior issues with alcoholism and excessive drug use. Patrick explained it as:

In my lifetime, the sun definitely came out at night.... I’m a recovering drug addict and a recovering alcoholic, but when I was taking drugs, there were a few nights where my blood turned into golden, beautiful sunshine. It was all chemical-based, and I knew it was a lie, but it was completely overwhelming, and it was like the sun had come out at night."

Patrick changed the album title from Gurney to The Sun Comes Out Tonight after feeling so inspired by writing the lyrics of the respective song. The song's guitar riff was inspired by the work of Deftones. The track "Self-Inflicted" was written in efforts to understand the mindset of a serial killer. He wrote the lyrics through their viewpoint that "society made them do it", with Patrick stating "For example, an event like Columbine, [looking at it as if] the shooters were the victims and that somehow we or society made them do it – that somehow they were the victims. That this was self-inflicted". "Burn It" is about how people hurt or kill themselves when they give up when they cannot come to terms with society and the world around them. "It's Just You" was written about the sense of isolation that comes with alcohol abuse, but that there's hope in recovering as well. Writing the piano ballad "It's My Time" originated from when Patrick was asked to write a song for the television show, Justified on FX; he wrote it "from a person's perspective of them being killed and knowing it", and stated its meant to convey the feeling of being wrongfully convicted of a crime.

== Release and promotion ==
Prior to the album's release, the band released several songs ahead of time, including the album's opening track "We Hate It When You Get What You Want" as a free download in March, "What Do You Say" as a single in April, along with an accompanying lyrics video. Additionally, other songs were made available for streaming beforehand, including "Self-Inflicted" in May. After the album's release, the band toured in promotion of it. In June and July 2013, joined Art Alexakis's 90's nostalgia tour "Summerland: Alternative Guitars" along with Alexakis's band, Everclear, Live, and Sponge. After that, the band will embark on a tour with Stone Temple Pilots and their new lead singer Chester Bennington. The track "Burn It" was also used in a television commercial for the 2013 video game Diablo 3. The iTunes bonus track "The Hand That's Dealt" was released as a free download from the band in July 2014.

The band has also turned to crowdsourcing platform IndieGoGo for the funding of a future world tour. While the plans did not pan out, the band still toured extensively for the album, even into early 2015. The band announced that they would tour with Coal Chamber in March and April 2015, and release a new, live performance music video for the track "We Hate It When You Get What You Want".

== Reception ==
Professional ratings
Review scores
Source	Rating
AllMusic	4/5 stars
Melodic.net	4/5 stars
Revolver	3/5 stars

The album was generally well received. AllMusic praised the album's high production values, and labeled it as "the most satisfying latter-day album this group has yet made." Revolver magazine praised the album for its dynamics between songs, stating that the "industrial-strength angst on tracks such as "We Hate It when You Get What You Want", "This Finger’s For You", and the particularly brutal "Self Inflicted"...makes the pretty moments like "Surprise" that much more effective, while the stark "It’s My Time" is as harrowing as any of the heavier tracks." The Marshalltown praised the album for achieving Patrick's goal of making a modern day version of Short Bus, referring to the album as "a triumph" and that "Patrick’s voice is still at the forefront of the songs, much to their credit. His is one of the best in all of angst-rock. The production is expectedly crisp and balanced, making the quiet-loud super quiet and super loud respectively". Alternative Nation praised the album for sounding "like the logical mature follow up to The Amalgamut" and that it "embodies the sonic spirit of early Filter.", concluding that "Patrick’s voice sounds the best it has in years, and the clean production style helps elevate the songs".

Many critics praised the addition of Radtke's guitar-work and song writing contributions.

The album debuted at no. 52 on the US Billboard 200 chart, selling 8,522 in its first week, higher than the band's prior album, The Trouble With Angels, which debuted at no. 64 with only 6,300 copies sold. The album has sold 25,000 copies in the US as of March 2016.

== Track listing ==
All music is composed by Richard Patrick, Bob Marlette, and Jonny Radtke, except "It's My Time", by Patrick and Marlette, and "The Hand That's Dealt", by Patrick and Radtke.

No.	Title	Length
1.	"We Hate It When You Get What You Want"	3:47
2.	"What Do You Say"	3:48
3.	"Surprise"	4:19
4.	"Watch the Sun Come Out Tonight"	4:05
5.	"It’s Got to Be Right Now"	3:19
6.	"This Finger’s for You"	3:52
7.	"Self Inflicted"	3:18
8.	"First You Break It"	3:36
9.	"Burn It"	4:22
10.	"Take That Knife Out of My Back"	3:41
11.	"It’s My Time"	3:25
12.	"It’s Just You"	4:11
Total length:		45:43

iTunes bonus tracks
No.	Title	Length
13.	"The Better Years"	3:45
14.	"Faded"	3:02
15.	"The Hand That's Dealt" (UK bonus track)	3:07

== Personnel ==
Band

- Richard Patrick – lead vocals, guitar, bass guitar, programming, drum programming
- Jonny Radtke – guitar, bass guitar, backing vocals

Other

- Bob Marlette – producer
- Chris Lord-Alge – mixing

== Charts ==
Chart (2013)	Peak position
US Billboard 200	52
US Top Alternative Albums (Billboard)	16
US Top Hard Rock Albums (Billboard)	5
US Top Rock Albums (Billboard)	19
US Indie Store Album Sales (Billboard)	16
