= Soldiers of Misfortune (song) =

Single by Filter

from the album Anthems for the Damned
- Released: March 18, 2008
- Length: 4:27
- Label: Pulse; Fontana
- Songwriter: Richard Patrick
- Producer: Josh Abraham

Filter singles chronology
"American Cliché" (2002)	"Soldiers of Misfortune" (2008)	"What's Next" (2008)

"Soldiers of Misfortune" is the lead single from Filter's fourth studio album, Anthems for the Damned. It premiered on Myspace on February 25, 2008 and was released to radio stations on March 18, 2008. "Soldiers of Misfortune" was added to Amazon MP3 and iTunes on April 29, 2008.

The song is described by singer Richard Patrick as a "sardonic anti-war/pro-troops song." Its first-person narrative was inspired by a letter from Sgt. Justin L. Eyerly, a Filter fan who had enlisted in the Army National Guard to get his college tuition paid; in his final year of college, he was shipped off to Iraq where he died from an improvised explosive device attack after only two months of duty.

== Music video ==
The video for the song features the band performing while shots of soldiers and war are shown, as well as plastic soldiers shooting each other.

== Charts ==
Chart (2008)	Peak position
US Mainstream Rock (Billboard)	27
