= Talk Show (band) =

American rock band

- Genres: Alternative rock; hard rock
- Years active: 1995–1998
- Label: Atlantic Records
- Spinoff of: Stone Temple Pilots
- Members: Dave Coutts; Dean DeLeo; Robert DeLeo; Eric Kretz

Talk Show was an American alternative/hard rock band consisting of Dave Coutts (vocals), Dean DeLeo (guitar), Robert DeLeo (bass), and Eric Kretz (drums). The group was essentially Stone Temple Pilots with Coutts (formerly of the band Ten Inch Men) taking the place of Scott Weiland, who was working on solo material and struggling with drug addiction.

Talk Show released their self-titled (and only) album on Atlantic Records in September 1997. From this album they released the single "Hello Hello" which they also shot a music video for. Despite positive reviews and supporting tours with the Foo Fighters and Aerosmith, the album's sales were disappointing and deemed a commercial failure. With the lackluster sales after the promotional radio release of "Everybody Loves My Car", Coutts left the band and the DeLeo brothers with Kretz soon reunited with Weiland as Stone Temple Pilots once again.

== Discography ==
- Talk Show (1997)
