= Army of Anyone (album) =

Studio album by Army of Anyone
- Released: November 14, 2006
- Studio: The Village Studio, Santa Monica
- Genre: Alternative rock; hard rock
- Length: 49:24
- Label: The Firm
- Producer: Bob Ezrin; Army of Anyone

Singles from Army of Anyone
- 1. "Goodbye" Released: July 28, 2006; 2. "Father Figure" Released: March 2007

Army of Anyone is the only studio album by American rock supergroup Army of Anyone. The band consisted of Richard Patrick of Filter, Robert DeLeo and Dean DeLeo of Stone Temple Pilots, and Ray Luzier, prior drummer of David Lee Roth's band and current drummer of the nu metal band Korn. The album was released on November 14, 2006, in the US and December 4 in the UK. It was produced by the band and Bob Ezrin and mixed by Ken Andrews.

Despite largely positive reviews from critics, the album sold below the expectations set by Filter and Stone Temple Pilots' past multi-platinum albums, with around 88,000 copies sold. The album produced two singles, "Goodbye" and "Father Figure", the former peaking at number three on the U.S. Mainstream Rock chart.

== Background ==
The album's origin traces back to Richard Patrick and the DeLeo brothers taking breaks from their respective bands, Filter and Stone Temple Pilots. Shortly after releasing Filter's third album, The Amalgamut, Patrick checked himself into rehab in October 2002, ceasing all band activity and touring for the time being. Around the same time, in late 2002, Stone Temple Pilots broke up due to increasing problems with lead singer Scott Weiland and his issues with substance abuse.

Once out of rehab, Patrick began writing new material for a fourth Filter album. Upon Patrick hearing that Dean and Robert DeLeo had wanted to work with him on a song for the album, he invited them over to do so. The result of their meeting was a track called "A Better Place", and a twelve-hour jam session. Patrick felt so strongly about the music that he put the fourth Filter album on hold, despite his record label urging him to continue, in order to start a new band with the DeLeo brothers. Ray Luzier was called to audition after the DeLeo brothers were impressed with Ray's sound check at a show. Luzier joined the band later after a successful audition.

== Writing and recording ==
Formal recording for the band's debut album commenced in 2005. They entered the studio with Bob Ezrin, the producer behind Pink Floyd's epic rock opera The Wall. The band had recorded more than 30 songs in Patrick's home studio, 11 of which would make their way on to their debut album, and another 2 being released as b-sides.

The album was originally slated for an early 2006 release through Columbia Records. However, most of the personnel who backed them at the label were fired during the process of recording the album, making them opt to change their label. Instead, the band signed to The Firm Music, a division of the band's management company The Firm, Inc. Beyond the label switching, Patrick commented further delay was caused by personal commitments, such as members family's getting married and having children. During this time, they also opted replace the album's original mix, with ones done by sound engineer Ken Andrews. They were able to fit this into their schedules because they used Andrew's Pro Tools set up at his house, rather than renting out time at a high budget studio.

== Release and promotion ==
The album was finally released on November 14, 2006. The band's first single was the track "Goodbye", which gathered significant radio airplay, peaking at number three in the U.S. Mainstream Rock chart. However, the second and final single, "Father Figure", failed to match that success, only peaking at number 31 in the same chart.

The band started touring in support of the album on November 18, including performances of "Goodbye" on Late Night with Conan O'Brien and Last Call with Carson Daly. In addition to playing songs from the album, they also included covers of the Stone Temple Pilots songs "Big Bang Baby," "Vasoline," and "Interstate Love Song," as well as "Hey Man, Nice Shot," "Take a Picture", and "Welcome to the Fold" by Filter. Additionally, an interlude version of "The Rain Song" by Led Zeppelin was played on occasion. The band would also go on to headline the SnoCore Tour in 2007 with the band Hurt, and later toured with Three Days Grace.

The song "It Doesn't Seem to Matter" is featured in the 2007 video game Burnout Dominator.

== Critical reception ==
Professional ratings
Review scores
Source	Rating
AllMusic	4.5/5 stars
Dose	3.5/5 stars
Entertainment Weekly	B+
Jam!	3/5 stars
PopMatters	4/10 stars
Rolling Stone	3.5/5 stars

Army of Anyone was generally well received by critics. David Fricke of Rolling Stone compared the release favorably to Audioslave but stated that it "...sounds much better than that on this debut". He also praised Patrick as "a less idiosyncratic singer than STP's Scott Weiland, cleaner in tone, more on the note". Jo-Ann Greene of Allmusic described the album as boasting "sharply written numbers filled with dynamics, musical nuances, and a big sound courtesy of producer Bob Ezrin". She closed by noting, "With its mixtures of moods, subtle use of genre-shifting, and powerhouse guitars, Army of Anyone breaks down the rock barriers..." The album received a positive review from Marc Weingarten of Entertainment Weekly as well, who praised the group's '90s rock style and stated that "...there's a place for this band in 2006...the DeLeo brothers' melodic twists and turns prevent the songs from settling into a tired groove".

Despite largely positive reviews, Army of Anyone was considered a commercial disappointment compared to prior multi platinum-selling releases from Stone Temple Pilots and Filter. The record debuted at number 56 on the Billboard 200. According to Nielsen SoundScan, it had sold 88,000 copies as of April 2010.

== Track listing ==
1. "It Doesn't Seem to Matter" (Richard Patrick, Robert DeLeo, Dean DeLeo) – 3:51
2. "Goodbye" (Patrick, R. DeLeo, D. DeLeo) – 4:31
3. "Generation" (Patrick, R. DeLeo, D. DeLeo) – 3:30
4. "A Better Place" (Patrick, R. DeLeo) – 4:58
5. "Non Stop" (Patrick, R. DeLeo, D. DeLeo) – 3:58
6. "Disappear" (Patrick, R. DeLeo) – 4:07
7. "Stop Look and Listen" (Patrick, R. DeLeo) – 3:51
8. "Ain't Enough" (Patrick, R. DeLeo) – 3:44
9. "Father Figure" (Patrick) – 4:04
10. "Leave It" (Patrick, D. DeLeo) – 4:27
11. "This Wasn't Supposed to Happen" (Patrick, D. DeLeo) – 5:22

B-sides

1. "Good Time to Loosen" (iTunes exclusive)
2. "Used to Know Her" (iTunes exclusive)

Bonus tracks

1. "Ain't Enough (Acoustic)" (Target exclusive)
2. "It Doesn't Seem to Matter (Acoustic)" (Best Buy exclusive)
3. "Disappear (Acoustic)" (Rhapsody exclusive)

== Chart positions ==
Album

Year	Chart	Position
2006	Billboard 200	56

Singles

Year	Song	U.S. Modern Rock	U.S. Mainstream Rock
2006	"Goodbye"	21	3
2007	"Father Figure"	—	31

== Personnel ==
Army of Anyone

- Richard Patrick – vocals
- Dean DeLeo – guitars
- Robert DeLeo – bass guitar, backing vocals
- Ray Luzier – drums

Production

- Bob Ezrin – producer
- Ken Andrews – mix engineer
