= Dean DeLeo =

American guitarist (born 1961)

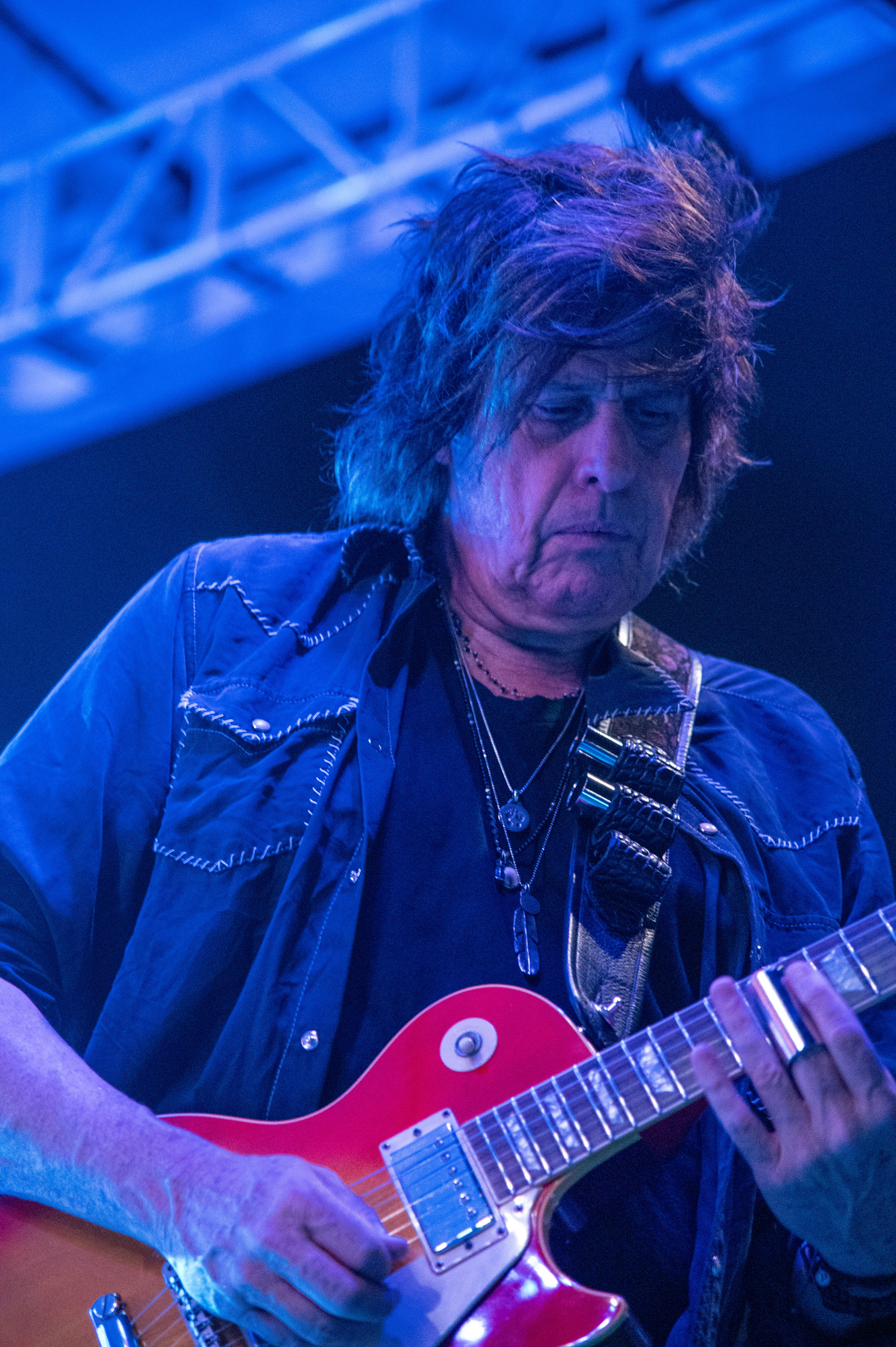
- DeLeo performing in 2024

Background information
- Born: August 23, 1961 (age 64); Montclair, New Jersey, U.S.
- Genres: Alternative rock, hard rock, grunge, psychedelic rock
- Occupation: Guitarist
- Years active: 1977–present
- Labels: Atlantic, Machine Shop
- Website: stonetemplepilots.com

Dean DeLeo (born August 23, 1961) is an American guitarist known for his work with rock band Stone Temple Pilots. DeLeo is also known for his role in the short-lived bands Talk Show and Army of Anyone. He is the older brother of Robert DeLeo, who plays bass for Stone Temple Pilots.

== Early life ==
DeLeo and his younger brother Robert were both born in Montclair, New Jersey, and raised in the Jersey Shore community of Point Pleasant Beach. He is of Italian, Irish and Swedish ancestry.

== Career ==
=== Stone Temple Pilots (1985–2003, 2008–present) ===
Dean's younger brother Robert met future vocalist Scott Weiland after the latter witnessed him perform at various gigs. Robert soon after introduced Dean to Scott and an idea of forming a band was brought up. Dean was a guitarist and Robert managed to convince him to join. They eventually joined up with drummer Eric Kretz, and the band was formed. They took the name Mighty Joe Young, inspired by the movie of the same name. They played gigs in many bars around San Diego and the Hollywood area, and eventually landed a record deal with Atlantic Records in 1992. However, they were forced to change their name, as the name "Mighty Joe Young" had already been taken by a blues musician. Weiland decided on the name "Stone Temple Pilots"; although he stated that it has no real meaning, he just liked the initials "STP".

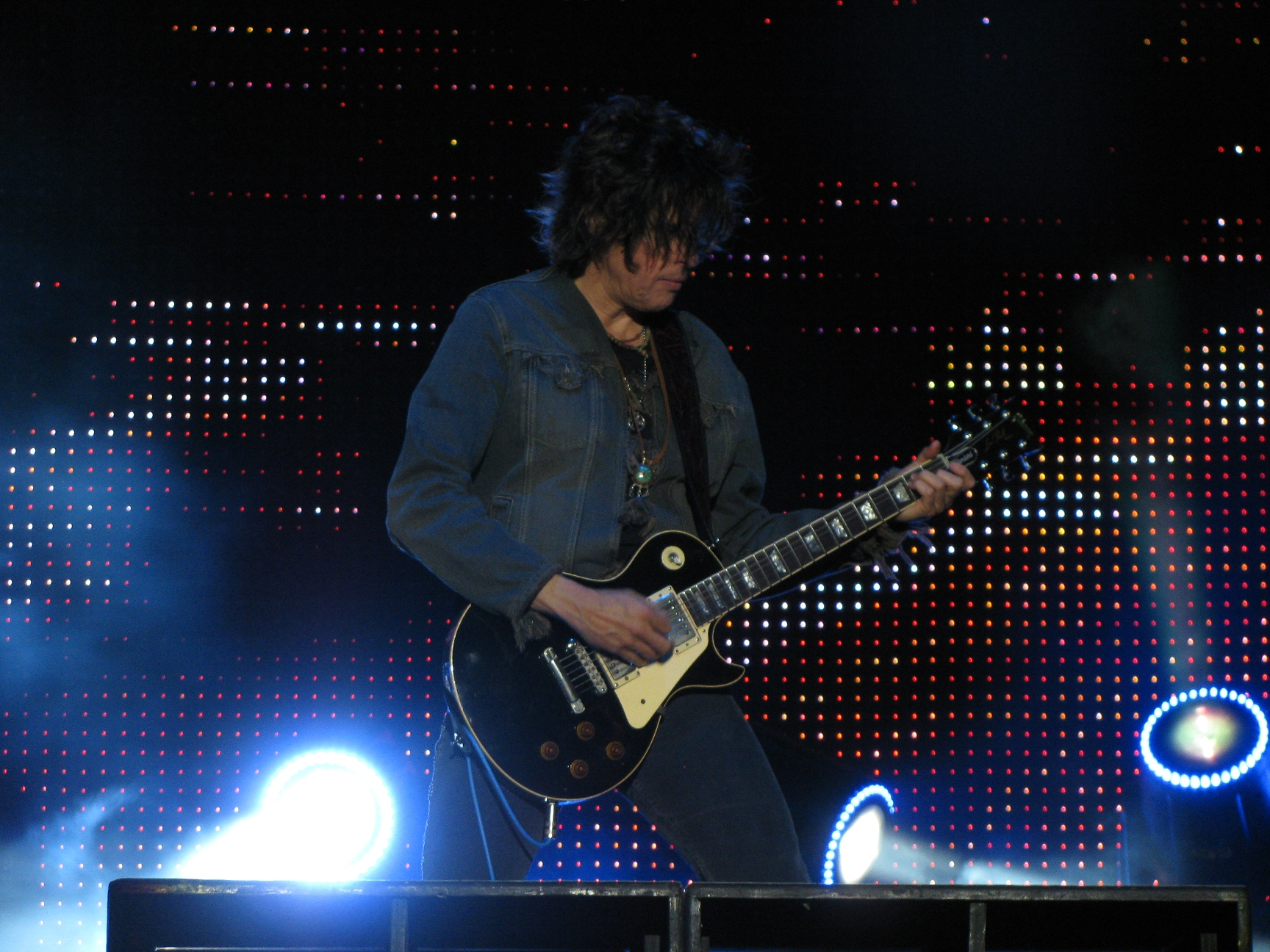
DeLeo performing with Stone Temple Pilots in 2009

The band quickly rose to fame with the release of their debut album Core, which sold over 8 million copies. The record sales were propelled by the release of the singles "Sex Type Thing" and "Plush", and helped establish Stone Temple Pilots as one of the many popular grunge bands in the early 1990s. However, they were ripped by critics for jumping on the bandwagon and profiting from the grunge mania. With their second album Purple, they challenged critics and became a genuine commercial rock act. Stone Temple Pilots released a total of five studio albums and managed to sell over 30 million records worldwide. In 2008, after over five years apart, the band reunited. On May 25, 2010, the band released their sixth album, Stone Temple Pilots, the first album released after the band reunited.

=== Talk Show, Army of Anyone and other work (1997–present) ===
The DeLeos and Eric Kretz formed a new band, Talk Show, which released one album. DeLeo worked with Laughter Train in the late 1990s. Stone Temple Pilots soon released two more albums, and disbanded once again in 2002. Weiland became the lead singer of Velvet Revolver, Kretz opened a studio in California, and the DeLeo brothers began to work with Richard Patrick, lead singer of the band Filter to compose songs for Filter's fourth album. The end result was a song that the three liked, so they contacted Ray Luzier, a famed session drummer, and Army of Anyone was formed. The band's debut was released on November 14, 2006, and they broke up in May 2007.

In 2021, he teamed up with Tom Bukovac for a new project, Trip The Witch. The debut single "Saturn We Miss You" features Jon Anderson on vocals, and the project's self-titled debut album was released on September 10, 2021.

In 2025, he announced a new project with English singer and lyricist Pete Shoulder titled One More Satellite. Their debut song "Paper Over the Cracks" was released on May 8, 2025.

=== Production work ===
DeLeo and his younger brother Robert produced Stone Temple Pilots' 2010 album, Stone Temple Pilots. The DeLeo brothers also produced the album TruANT by Alien Ant Farm.
