= The Crystal Method discography =

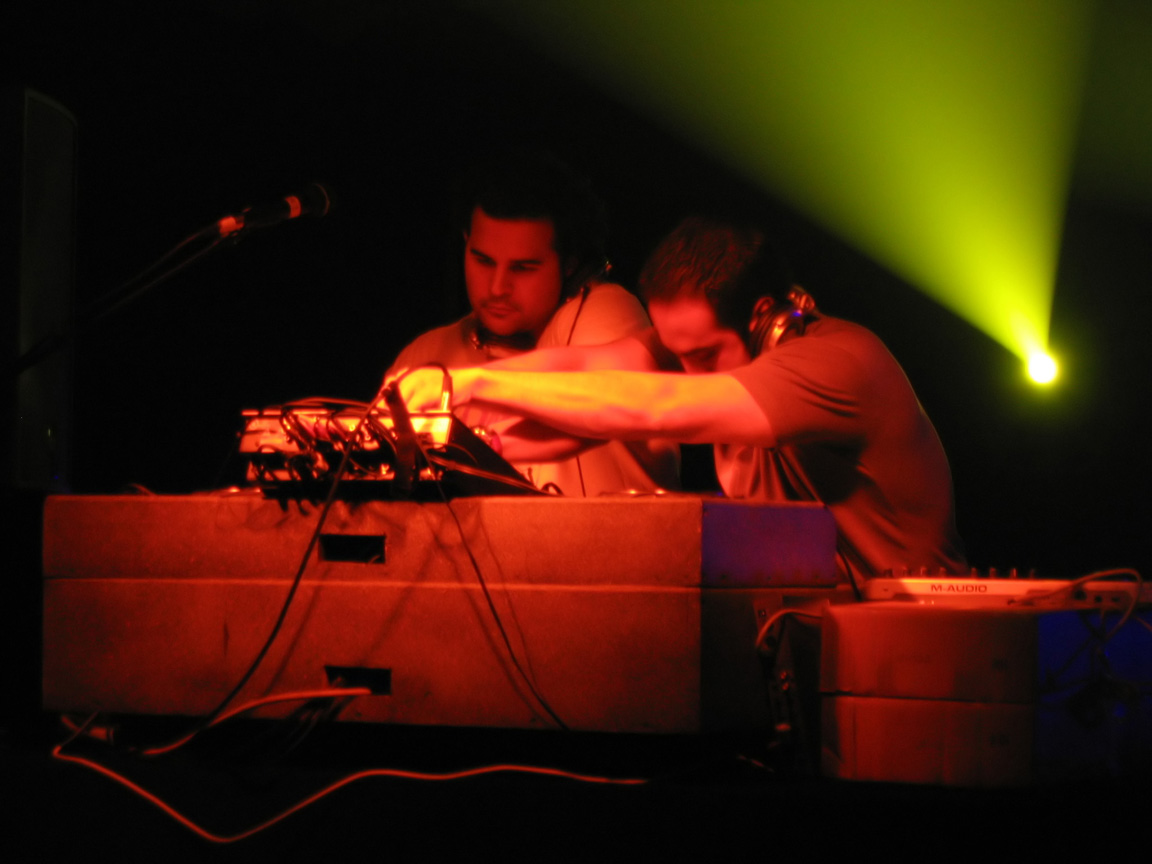
- The Crystal Method performing at Earthlink, 2006
- Studio albums: 7
- Extended plays: 1
- Soundtrack albums: 3
- Compilation albums: 4
- Singles: 20
- Music videos: 9

The discography of American electronic music duo The Crystal Method comprises seven studio albums, four compilation albums, three soundtrack albums, one extended play, twenty singles, and nine music videos. The album Vegas has sold more than one million copies in the United States, certifying it platinum. It is one of the best selling electronic albums in the United States, and it puts The Crystal Method in the top five best selling electronic bands in the United States. The Crystal Method's other three studio albums, Tweekend, Legion of Boom, and Divided by Night have charted high on the Billboard 200, especially for electronic albums, all making it to the thirties and charting especially high on the Top Electronic Albums list.

== Albums ==
=== Studio albums ===
Title	Album details	Peak chart positions				Certifications
Title	Album details	US	US Elec.	US Ind.	AUS	Certifications
Vegas	Released: August 26, 1997; Label: Outpost Recordings; Format: CD, CS, digital download, vinyl	92	—	—	74	MC: Gold; RIAA: Platinum
Tweekend	Released: July 31, 2001; Label: Geffen; Format: CD, CS, digital download, vinyl	32	1	—	154	
Legion of Boom	Released: January 13, 2004; Label: V2; Format: CD, digital download, vinyl	36	1	—	104	
Divided by Night	Released: May 12, 2009; Label: Tiny e Records; Format: CD, digital download, vinyl	38	2	4	—	
The Crystal Method	Released: January 14, 2014; Label: Tiny e Records; Format: CD, digital download, vinyl	56	3	9	—	
The Trip Home	Released: September 28, 2018; Label: Tiny e Records; Format: CD, digital download, vinyl	—	—	—	—	
The Trip Out	Released: April 15, 2022; Label: Tiny e Records; Format: digital download, vinyl	—	—	—	—	
"—" denotes releases that did not chart.

==== Box sets ====
Title	Information
The Crystal Method (20th Anniversary Vinyl Box Set)	Released: November 11, 2015; Label: Tiny e Records; Format: LP

==== Mix albums ====
Title	Album details	Peak chart positions		
Title	Album details	US	US Elec.	US Ind.
Community Service	Released: July 23, 2002; Label: Ultra; Format: CD, vinyl	160	5	15
Community Service II	Released: April 5, 2005; Label: Ultra; Format: CD, vinyl	—	8	31
Drive: Nike + Original Run	Released: June 28, 2006 (iTunes), June 26, 2007 (Best Buy), February 5, 2008 (WW); Label: tiny e Records; Format: Digital download	—	23	—
"—" denotes releases that did not chart.

=== Soundtrack albums ===
Title	Album details	Chart positions
Title	Album details	US Elec.
N_{2}O: Nitrous Oxide	Released: June 30, 1998; Label: Format:	—
London (Original Motion Picture Soundtrack)	Released: April 5, 2006; Label: Ultra; Format:	8
X Games 3D: The Movie	Released: August 21, 2009; Label: Format:	—
"—" denotes releases that did not chart.

== Extended plays ==
Title	EP details
CSII Exclusives	Released: April 5, 2005; Label: Ultra; Format: Digital download

== Singles ==
Title	Year	Peak chart positions					Album
Title	Year	US Alt.	US Dance Club	US Dance Sales	AUS	UK	Album
"Now Is the Time"	1994	—	—	—	—	—	Non-album single
"Keep Hope Alive"	1996	—	—	14	132	71	Vegas
"Come2gether"	1996	—	—	—	—	—	Mortal Kombat: More Kombat
"Busy Child"	1997	—	17	30	113	81	Vegas
"Trip Like I Do"	1997	—	—	—	—	—	Vegas
"(Can't You) Trip Like I Do" (with Filter)	1997	29	—	—	79	39	Vegas and Spawn (Soundtrack)
"Comin' Back"	1998	—	1	38	182	73	Vegas
"Blowout"	2001	—	—	—	—	—	Tweekend
"Name of the Game"	2001	22	5	5	—	—	Tweekend
"Murder"	2001	—	—	—	—	—	Tweekend
"Wild, Sweet and Cool"	2002	—	—	—	—	—	Tweekend
"Starting Over"	2003	—	—	—	—	—	Legion of Boom
"Born Too Slow"	2003	26	3	3	84	76	Legion of Boom
"Drown in the Now" (featuring Matisyahu)	2009	—	—	9	—	—	Divided by Night
"Black Rainbows" (featuring Stefanie King Warfield)	2009	—	—	—	—	—	Divided by Night
"Come Back Clean" (featuring Emily Haines)	2009	—	4	5	—	—	Divided by Night
"Sine Language" (featuring LMFAO)	2010	—	—	—	—	—	Divided by Night
"Make Some Noise (Put 'Em Up)" (featuring Yelawolf)	2011	—	—	—	—	—	Real Steel
"Emulator"	2013	—	—	—	—	—	The Crystal Method
"Over It" (featuring Dia Frampton)	2013	—	—	—	—	—	The Crystal Method
"—" denotes releases that did not chart.

== Remixes ==
Title	Year	Original artist(s)	Album
"Bodyslide"	1994	Cardinal	Bodyslide EP
"Everything Starts with an 'E'"	1995	E-Zee Possee	Everything Starts With An E
"Caterpillar"	1995	Keoki	Caterpillar
"Mad World"	1995	Zen Cowboys	Mad World
"Come On Baby"	1996	Moby	Come On Baby
"Reverend Black Grape"	1996	Black Grape	Reverend Black Grape
"Come Away"	1996	Amos	Come Away
"I Think I'm Crystallized"	1998	Garbage	I Think I'm Paranoid
"Now is the Time"	2000	The Crystal Method	The Crow: Salvation
"Renegades of Funk"	2002	Rage Against the Machine	Community Service
"Boom"	2002	P.O.D.	Boom
"Signs"	2002	James Newton Howard	Signs (Remixes)
"Pts.OF.Athrty"	2002	Linkin Park	Underground V2.0
"Roadhouse Blues"	2005	The Doors	Community Service II
"Bizarre Love Triangle"	2005	New Order	Community Service II
"Jack's Suite"	2005	Hans Zimmer	Pirates of the Caribbean: At World's End Remixes
"24 Theme"	2007	Sean Callery	24 Remixed - EP
"Name of the Game"	2008	The Crystal Method	Tropic Thunder (soundtrack)
"Now is the Time"	2008	The Crystal Method	Now is the Time (Vote '08 Remix)
"Why So Serious?"	2008	Hans Zimmer and James Newton Howard	The Dark Knight (soundtrack)
"The Grid"	2011	Daft Punk	Tron: Legacy Reconfigured
"Leave the Lights On"	2012	Meiko	Leave the Lights On (Remixed)
"Kinetic" (The Crystal Method vs. Dada Life)	2015	League of Legends	Non-album
"Rebel Yell" (The Crystal Method Remix)	2018	Billy Idol	Vital Idol: Revitalized

== Music videos ==
Title	Year	Director(s)
"Keep Hope Alive"	1997	Doug Liman
"(Can't You) Trip Like I Do" (with Filter)	1997	Floria Sigismondi
"Busy Child" (original version)	1997	Lance Bangs
"Busy Child" (Lost in Space version)	1998	Clark Edddy
"Comin' Back"	1998	Peter Christopherson
"Name of the Game"	2001	Marcos Siega
"Murder" / "You Know It's Hard"	2001	Marcos Siega
"Born Too Slow"	2004	Gore Verbinski
"Drown in the Now"	2009	Alexandre Moors & Jessica Brillhart
"Come Back Clean"	2009	Alexandre Moors
"Sine Language"	2010	Joseph David Hyrkas
"Over It" (featuring Dia Frampton)	2013	Zak Stoltz
