= Divided by Night =

Studio album by The Crystal Method
- Released: May 12, 2009
- Recorded: Los Angeles
- Genre: Electronica
- Length: 67:14
- Label: Tiny e

The Crystal Method chronology
Drive: Nike + Original Run (2006)	Divided by Night (2009)	The Crystal Method (2014)

The Crystal Method studio album chronology
Legion of Boom (2004)	Divided by Night (2009)	The Crystal Method (2014)

Singles from Divided by Night
- 1. "Drown in the Now" Released: April 14, 2009; 2. "Black Rainbows" Released: April 28, 2009; 3. "Come Back Clean" Released: October 5, 2009; 4. "Sine Language" Released: November 16, 2010

Divided by Night is electronic duo The Crystal Method's fourth studio album. The album was released on May 12, 2009. The first single, "Drown in the Now", which features vocals by Matisyahu, was released to the iTunes Store on April 14, 2009, and the second single, "Black Rainbows" was released to the Beatport store on April 28, 2009. On October 5, 2009, they released the third single, "Come Back Clean" also exclusively to Beatport.

The album was nominated at the 52nd Grammy Awards for Best Electronic/Dance Album, but lost to Lady Gaga's The Fame.

== Background ==
After their album Legion of Boom was released, Ken Jordan and Scott Kirkland decided to move into their new, state-of-the-art recording studio, called Crystalwerks. The time taken to prepare the new studio resulted in the loss of production time on the album, which is why it has taken so long to come out. They have also taken the time to bring in many guest artists to be featured on the album.

In early August 2008, The Crystal Method revealed their plans for the album. Though the album was planned to release by the end of summer, the release date was pushed back to early 2009. They then released a free song on their website, which was a remix of their first single, "Now is the Time". The remix features samples of a Barack Obama speech, and is called "Now is the Time (Vote '08 Remix)". The Crystal Method was asked if "Now Is the Time (Vote '08 Remix)" would be on Divided by Night. They replied "maybe, just as a bonus track", though it has been confirmed that the song will not be on the new album according to the track listing, which was released in mid February 2009.

In October 2008, they released a series of tour dates for a DJ set tour across North America, which went further into the year, finishing on New Year's Eve, 2008. They would play some of the music off of their new album to support the tour.

In December 2008, they set up a remix contest for the song "Double Down Under" on the new album, and released the name of the lead single, "Drown in the Now", which features vocals by Matisyahu.

During an interview in early 2009, The Crystal Method were asked the release date of the album, and Ken Jordan simply stated: "Spring". The Crystal Method later stated that the album would be due in stores on May 12.

In an interview with The Boston Herald, Scott Kirkland said:

The album is different. There are big, organic live drums and distortion and lots of bass and that sort of bombastic sound that we’ve been doing for so many years. But lots of collaborations have taken it in lots of different directions. I think people are going to be happy with it.

A recent album preview by Mark Shemel of internedj.com indicated that the album was :

organic with live sounds pervasive throughout the album. There is also a sort of Hip Hop element infused in certain songs such as "Sine Language." The group makes excellent use of distortion throughout the album. While some of the tracks were reminiscent of Crystal Method of the past, others seem to move beyond the style of music they pretty much pioneered. Regardless, the group has not lost contact with its roots, and their famous touch with music.

In March, 2009, The Crystal Method released the cover of the album, tour dates, a new website, and a pre-order sale on their online store. On April 14, the single, "Drown in the Now" was released onto the iTunes store along with a pre-order for Divided by Night. The pre-order on iTunes also comes with a bonus B-side, "Play for Real". This song is only available on the pre-order for iTunes, and (according to The Crystal Method's Myspace blog) will not be released anywhere else.

In late April, 2009, The Crystal Method put one song from Divided by Night onto their Myspace page, "Sine language", which features the upcoming hip hop duo, LMFAO. On the very same day that "Sine Language" was put on their Myspace page, The Crystal Method released the second single from Divided by Night, the song, "Black Rainbows" (exclusively to Beatport) which features vocals from Stefanie King Warfield, wife of Justin Warfield, who also contributes to Divided by Night himself on the track "Kling to the Wreckage".

On May 5, 2009, while flying to their first show in Boston via Virgin Airlines, The Crystal Method set up a one-hour online chat room that anyone could join for free. They answered various questions from fans and talked about Divided by Night. The Crystal Method said that it is probable that they will do something like this again.

On May 7, the entire album Divided by Night was put onto iLike for anyone to listen to. This includes the full versions of every song on Divided by Night (except for "Play for Real", released on iTunes only).

Divided by Night was finally officially released on May 12.

== Album artwork ==
In mid March, 2009, The Crystal Method released the cover of the new album, which features a giant globe made up of audio speaker heads hovering in mid-air. The artwork was created by Neil Ashby.

When asked about the cover, Ken Jordan said, "On a recent plane trip to a DJ gig, we caught an amazing sight. The sun was setting in the west. There were spectacular rich colors on the horizon, but on the ground below, it was night. We both were moved by this incredible contrast."

Scott Kirkland added, "Divided By Night immediately popped into my head, not so much as an album title but as a metaphor for our lives. As I enjoyed this beautiful view from my cramped seat, I thought of my family in California and reflected on just how different these two worlds are."

== Reception ==
Professional ratings
Aggregate scores
Source	Rating
Metacritic	56/100
Review scores
Source	Rating
AllMusic	3/5 stars
Alternative Press	1.5/5 stars
Consequence of Sound	D
IGN	8.5/10
PopMatters	5/10
Spin	3/10
Tiny Mix Tapes	2/5 stars
URB	4/5 stars

Divided by Night reached more charts than any other studio album by the band, the Billboard 200, the Top Electronic Albums, and Top Independent Albums. It is, so far, the only album besides Vegas which has not reached number one on the Top Electronic Albums chart, it only reached number two. It was beaten by The Fame by Lady Gaga. It also reached number four on the Top Independent Albums chart, the highest ever reached on that chart by The Crystal Method and only studio album to ever be on that chart (the only other albums by the band to hit that chart were their two mix albums, Community Service and Community Service II). It also reached thirty-eighth place on the Billboard 200 on its opening week.

== Singles ==
=== "Drown in the Now" ===
The cover of the "Drown in the Now" single released on iTunes on April 14, 2009.

In December 2008, The Crystal Method released the name of their first single from Divided by Night, "Drown in the Now". During the same interview, they said that the song would feature reggae rapper Matisyahu, whom they had met earlier. Before playing a show in British Columbia, Matisyahu's tour manager approached The Crystal Method and asked if they would be willing to play a show onstage with him. Matisyahu came by The Crystal Method's trailer and they (The Crystal Method) played the song "High Roller", from Vegas for Matisyahu. Matisyahu thought it was great, and performed a show with The Crystal Method onstage an hour later. This performance can be found on YouTube. After this performance, The Crystal Method knew that they wanted to work with him on their album. Scott Kirkland stated: "He [Matisyahu] delivered something unique that helped create a great vibe for the rest of the album."

During a December interview, The Crystal Method said the new single would be released in mid to late April. In a 2009 interview, Scott Kirkland stated that the song was "very dark and galvanizing" and that he thinks that fans will like it. On March 21, 2009, DJ Demko played the entire song, "Drown in the Now" on his nightly radio show on Z-104.5, a radio station in Tulsa, Oklahoma. Two days later, the segment of the radio show when "Drown in the Now" was played was made into a video and uploaded onto YouTube. "Drown in the Now" was released on iTunes on April 14, 2009.

On April 22, the music video for the song was premiered on Yahoo. The video was shot in black and white and partially animated. The video features Matisyahu, who is walking through the snowy abandoned streets of New York City. It features shortened edit of the song.

=== "Black Rainbows" ===
The cover of the "Black Rainbows" single released on Beatport on April 28, 2009.

In an interview in early 2009, The Crystal Method said that they would feature vocals from Justin Warfield. During the same interview, they said that Warfield's wife, Stefanie King Warfield, would also be on the album. On April 28, 2009, "Black Rainbows" was released as a single exclusively to Beatport to be downloaded for $1.99.

=== "Come Back Clean" ===
The song features vocals by Emily Haines. Ken Jordan announced via The Crystal Method's Twitter account that "Come Back Clean" had multiple remixes by at least one artist, Kaskade, and that he could not wait for fans to hear them. On October 5, 2009, "Come Back Clean" was released as their third single. It was exclusively released on Beatport.

=== "Sine Language" ===
"Sine Language" is the fourth single from the album. The song features vocals by hip hop duo LMFAO. The original music was written by Ken Jordan and Scott Kirkland including LMFAO.

It was announced more than a year after the release of the single "Come Back Clean", on November 4, 2010, when the band scored a video game called Blur, and it was finally released on November 16, 2010, as a promotional remix EP by the official site of the electronic duo, that could be downloaded from the site by joining it. LMFAO's raps are accompanied by a single edit and seven brand new remixes, including reworked versions by Richard Vission, Future Funk Squad, Moonbeam, Datsik, Metasyn, Omega and Von Ukuf.

Its music video features a performance of LMFAO. All LMFAO or The Crystal Method footage was shot and filmed live in downtown Minneapolis, Minnesota.

Sine Language was included on EA's soundtrack for the game Need for Speed: Nitro.

== Tour ==
In early 2009, The Crystal Method said that they would go on a major national tour, their first in 5 years since Legion of Boom. A sort of preview of the tour was on April 17, 2009 at the Coachella Valley Music and Arts Festival. This concert has been said to be the first of the entire tour, though, according to the tour dates (which were released in late March), the first official concert is not until May 6. Supposedly, the new tour will bring in new elements that have never been seen from The Crystal Method live. Ken Jordan comments about the new tour: "This tour is going to be a completely new look. It's like tearing down your house and rebuilding it."

The Divided by Night tour spanned across the United States and part of Canada, from early May to mid June.

After the original tour was over, The Crystal Method decided to add several more tour dates to their list – and most of them span across Europe. The Crystal Method has played at the Reading and Leeds Festivals, and will continue to tour Europe until early November 2009.

City	Venue	Date
Boston	House of Blues	May 6, 2009
Montreal	Metropolis	May 7, 2009
Toronto	The Guvernment	May 8, 2009
New York City	Webster Hall	May 9, 2009
Philadelphia	The Theater of Living Arts	May 10, 2009
Cleveland	House of Blues	May 11, 2009
Baltimore	Rams Head Live!	May 12, 2009
Fort Lauderdale, Florida	Revolution Live	May 14, 2009
Lake Buena Vista, Florida	House of Blues	May 15, 2009
Atlanta	The Tabernacle	May 16, 2009
New Orleans	House of Blues	May 17, 2009
Houston	House of Blues	May 18, 2009
Austin, Texas	La Zona Rosa	May 19, 2009
Dallas	House of Blues	May 20, 2009
Las Vegas	House of Blues	May 22, 2009
Tempe, Arizona	Marquee Theatre	May 23, 2009
Tucson, Arizona	Rialto Theatre	May 24, 2009
San Diego	House of Blues	May 26, 2009
San Francisco	The Warfield Theatre	May 28, 2009
Portland, Oregon	Roseland Theater	May 29, 2009
Seattle	WaMu Theater	May 30, 2009
Vancouver	Commodore Ballroom	June 1, 2009
Calgary	The Whiskey	June 3, 2009
Milwaukee	Rave at The Eagles Club	June 6, 2009
Minneapolis	First Avenue	June 7, 2009
Chicago	House of Blues	June 8, 2009
St. Louis	The Pageant	June 9, 2009
Kansas City, Missouri	Beaumont Club	June 10, 2009
Aspen, Colorado	Belly Up Aspen	June 12, 2009
Salt Lake City	Murray Theater	June 14, 2009
Las Vegas	Las Vegas Motor Speedway	June 24, 2009

=== Setlist ===
The Divided by Night Tour had the same tracks and track order for each show:

1. "Why So Serious? (The Crystal Method Remix)" originally composed by Hans Zimmer and James Newton Howard, from the film, "The Dark Knight"
2. "Divided by Night", from the album, Divided by Night
3. "Roll it Up", from the album, Tweekend
4. "Vapor Trail", from the album, Vegas
5. "Badass", from the EP, CSII Exclusives
6. "Bound Too Long", from the album, Legion of Boom
7. "Double Down Under", from the album, Divided by Night
8. "Come Back Clean", from the album, Divided by Night
9. "Blowout", from the album, Tweekend
10. "Cherry Twist", from the album, Vegas
11. "High Roller", from the album, Vegas
12. "Wild, Sweet and Cool", from the album, Tweekend
13. "Born Too Slow", from the album, Legion of Boom
14. "Now Is the Time", from the album, Vegas
15. "Keep Hope Alive", from the album, Vegas
16. "Busy Child", from the album, Vegas
17. "Trip Like I Do", from the album, Vegas

== Track listing ==
No.	Title	Length
1.	"Divided by Night"	5:03
2.	"Dirty Thirty" (featuring Peter Hook)	5:26
3.	"Drown in the Now" (featuring Matisyahu)	5:49
4.	"Kling to the Wreckage" (featuring Justin Warfield)	4:06
5.	"Smile?"	5:36
6.	"Sine Language" (featuring LMFAO)	6:17
7.	"Double Down Under"	5:51
8.	"Come Back Clean" (featuring Emily Haines)	4:59
9.	"Slipstream" (featuring Jason Lytle)	5:21
10.	"Black Rainbows" (featuring Stefanie King Warfield)	6:23
11.	"Blunts & Robots" (featuring Peter Hook)	5:51
12.	"Falling Hard" (featuring Meiko)	6:39

iTunes deluxe edition bonus tracks
No.	Title	Length
13.	"Play for Real"	5:01
14.	"Divided by Night Track-by-Track video"	7:13
15.	"Drown in the Now music video"	3:35
16.	"Divided by Night Digital Booklet"	—

== Featured guests ==
Divided by Night has come to be known for having more featured guests than any other album by The Crystal Method – and most of these guest artists do not specialize in the electronic music genre.

- "Divided by Night" features additional synths by Jon Brion.
- "Dirty Thirty" features bass by Peter Hook.
- "Drown in the Now" features vocals by Matisyahu.
- "Kling to the Wreckage" features vocals by Justin Warfield and Stefanie King Warfield.
- "Sine Language" features vocals by LMFAO and marxophone by Jon Brion.
- "Come Back Clean" features vocals by Emily Haines and percussion by Samantha Maloney.
- "Slipstream" features vocals by Jason Lytle.
- "Black Rainbows" features vocals by Stefanie King Warfield.
- "Blunts & Robots" features bass by Peter Hook and a sample from the song "Gangsta Rap (Acapella)" by Ill Bill.
- "Falling Hard" features vocals by Meiko.
- "Play for Real" features the band The Heavy's guitarist Dan Taylor and vocals by Kelvin Swaby, trombone by Dave Hodge, saxophone by Robert Marshall, trumpet by Stewart Cole, and percussion by Samantha Maloney.
