= FIFA: Road to World Cup 98 =

1997 video game

- UK cover art, featuring David Beckham
- Developer: EA Canada (Note: Game Boy version developed by Tiertex Design Studios; Saturn version developed by Extended Play Productions and Climax Studios; Mega Drive and SNES versions developed by XYZ Productions.)
- Publishers: EA Sports; Game Boy; THQ
- Composers: Windows; Jonnie Forster; Mega Drive, Super NES; Eric Swanson
- Series: FIFA
- Platforms: Windows, PlayStation, Game Boy, Sega Saturn, Mega Drive, Nintendo 64, Super NES
- Release: 24 November 1997: PlayStation, Windows; NA: 24 November 1997; EU: 28 November 1997 Game Boy; EU: November 1997 Saturn; NA: 18 December 1997; EU: 1997 Nintendo 64; NA: 22 December 1997; EU: 26 December 1997 Super NES; EU: 1997
- Genre: Sports (association football)
- Modes: Single player, multiplayer

FIFA: Road to World Cup 98 is a 1997 football video game developed by EA Canada and released by EA Sports. It is the fifth game in the FIFA series and the second to be in 3D on the fifth generation of video game consoles. A number of different players were featured on the cover, including David Beckham in the UK, Roy Lassiter in the United States, Mexico and Brazil, David Ginola in France, Raúl in Spain and Portugal, Paolo Maldini in Italy, and Andreas Möller in Germany. Critics responded positively to FIFA 98, hailing it as a strong return to form for the series. FIFA 98 was the last FIFA game released for the Sega Mega Drive, Sega Saturn, and the Super Nintendo Entertainment System (SNES).

== Game features ==
The player on opponent's penalty area (PS1 version)

The game includes an official soundtrack, team and player customisation options, 16 stadiums, improved artificial intelligence and the Road to World Cup mode, with all 172 FIFA-registered national teams that took part in qualification for the 1998 FIFA World Cup (including Brazil and France, who qualified for the tournament automatically as holders and hosts respectively). No subsequent edition of the FIFA series attempted to replicate FIFA 98's inclusion of every FIFA national team, until 2010 FIFA World Cup South Africa, which included all 199 FIFA nations that took part in qualifying. Players have individual faces.

FIFA 98 features many accurate team rosters, including national reserves for national call-up when playing in the round-robin qualification modes. In addition, 11 leagues are featured, containing 189 clubs. The game also features a five-a-side indoor mode and was the first FIFA game to contain an in-game player/team editor.

For the first time in a FIFA game, the offside rule is properly implemented. In previous games, when a player was in an offside position doing anything except running, that player was penalised for offside even when the ball was passed backwards. The Windows, PlayStation, Nintendo 64, and Saturn versions of FIFA 98 correct this so that the game only awards a free kick for offside if the ball is passed roughly to where the player in the offside position is.

=== Soundtrack ===
The theme music for the game was Blur's "Song 2". Four songs from The Crystal Method are included – "Keep Hope Alive" and "Busy Child" off their debut album Vegas, their debut single "Now Is the Time", and original "More" – as well as a song by the Los Angeles-based project Electric Skychurch entitled "Hugga Bear". Des Lynam was retained for the game introduction and John Motson and Andy Gray remained as match commentators.

== Development ==
The game was built on the FIFA '97 engine. David Ginola served as the game's motion capture actor. The game was built on the FIFA 97 engine. David Ginola served as the game's motion capture actor. In the French-language version, match commentary was provided by sports journalist Thierry Gilardi and former France international Ginola.

== Reception ==
Reception

Review scores
| Publication | Score |
|---|---|
| Electronic Gaming Monthly | 8.0/10 (N64); 7.25/10 (PS1); 6.6/10 (SAT) |
| GameSpot | 8.5/10 (N64); 7.8/10 (SAT) |
| IGN | 7.7/10 (N64) |
| N64 Magazine | 83% (N64) |
| Next Generation | 4/5 (N64) |
| Play | 88% (PS1) |
| Sega Saturn Magazine | 58% (SAT) |

FIFA: Road to World Cup 98 was positively received. Though widely regarded as still inferior to International Superstar Soccer 64, most critics considered it a strong comeback from its predecessor, FIFA 97 / FIFA Soccer 64. Moreover, a few reviewers said that the game's extensive licensing of real players and teams was a strong advantage over International Superstar Soccer 64 which, though not enough to make it an overall better game, was a compelling enough reason for soccer fans to get both games. Next Generation, for example, concluded that "The game still doesn't have the fluidity of ISS 64, but the real players and variety of options make FIFA RTTWC 64 a game that soccer fans all over the world should enjoy." GamePro disagreed with the majority comparison to International Superstar Soccer 64, assessing FIFA 98 as "a super-fun title, easily topping International Superstar Soccer 64 in overall gameplay."

Other common subjects of critical praise were the accuracy and variation in the play-by-play commentary, the detailed rendering of the player models, the smooth animations, the wealth of play options, and the realistic moves. GameSpot commented, "From header lobs, header shots, and high volleys, to hip checks, hyperaggressive lunges, and slide tackles, the range of movement and playing style is enormous." However, critics widely mentioned weaknesses in the A.I., particularly the goalie A.I., and occasional drops in frame rate.

IGN stated in their review of the Nintendo 64 version, "EA seems to have learned its lesson and made use of some of the N64's unique features instead of treating the N64 the same way as PCs or the PSX." Electronic Gaming Monthly's Kelly Rickards said that the PlayStation version "doesn't quite have the magic that the N64 version provides" but is still the best soccer game for the PlayStation to date. GamePro also declared it the best PlayStation soccer game to date, particularly citing the "slick new passing cursor", fast gameplay, and stunning graphics.

The Saturn version was much less well-received; most reviews, though still positive, identified problems which did not exist in other versions of the game. GameSpot, for example, noted that the commentary often lagged behind the action in the Saturn version alone. Dan Hsu of Electronic Gaming Monthly complained of flat stadiums, broken player models, and a slow frame rate, and added, "Now, normally graphics are a secondary concern for me (gameplay, replay and all the other good stuff is way more important), but when the market has so many great soccer games, you need to make them look good." His three co-reviewers agreed that the game should have been better but nonetheless felt it held up well against the competition. By contrast, Sega Saturn Magazine panned the game, remarking that "With the infinitely superior SWWS '98 already available, it defies logic that anyone would purchase EA's latest lacklustre addition to the ailing FIFA series."

Reception of the Saturn version in continental Europe was mixed. French magazine Joypad awarded the game 5 out of 10, criticizing its lack of pace, jerky scrolling and unattractive presentation compared with the PlayStation version, and considered the Saturn conversion disappointing for such a prominent title. German magazine MAN!AC was more positive, awarding it 79%, praising its extensive player database, range of gameplay options and World Cup atmosphere while considering its technical presentation below the system's best. Another German magazine, Sega Magazin, awarded the Saturn version 82%, with reviewer Oliver Preißner praising its substantial improvements over the previous two instalments. However, he considered Sega Worldwide Soccer '98 superior in both graphics and gameplay, while acknowledging that FIFA's licensed teams and German-language commentary provided compelling reasons to choose Electronic Arts' game.

Italian magazine Mega Console gave the Saturn version 70 out of 100. The magazine considered its playability improved over earlier FIFA games, but criticized a decline in graphics and player animation and felt that longstanding gameplay weaknesses remained, particularly the ease of scoring through individual runs. It regarded multiplayer as more enjoyable but considered other football games available for the Saturn superior overall.

Upon its release, the game was a bestseller in the UK for two months. At the 1999 Milia festival in Cannes, it took home a "Gold" prize for revenues above €37 million in the European Union during the previous year.

The game was the winner for "PC Sports Game of the Year" at the Academy of Interactive Arts & Sciences' inaugural Interactive Achievement Awards (now known as the D.I.C.E. Awards).

During the game's 20th anniversary in 2017, Luke Plunkett of Kotaku wrote an essay arguing that FIFA 98 should be considered as the best sports video game of all time, focusing on its then-unprecedented depth and breadth of content, which Plunkett contended is the main differentiating factor between titles within the highly incremental sports video gaming industry. Examples cited were its inclusion of all FIFA national teams of the time, customization options for rosters and kits, multiple game modes, and groundbreaking soundtrack including licensed rather than original music.
