= Cake hole =

Cake Hole may refer to:

- The mouth, as a crude phrase

== Music ==
- "Cakehole", a song by Evil Nine
  - "Cake Hole", a remix by The Crystal Method on their Community Service album
  - "Cakewhole", a remix by Ferocious Mullet on the Überzone Presents: Y4K album
