= Tropic Thunder (soundtrack) =

Tropic Thunder: Original Motion Picture Soundtrack

Soundtrack album by Various Artists
- Released: August 5, 2008
- Length: 56:31
- Label: Lakeshore

Tropic Thunder: Original Motion Picture Soundtrack was released on August 5, 2008, the week before the film was released in theaters.

Five songs, "Cum On Feel the Noize" by Quiet Riot, "Sympathy for the Devil" by The Rolling Stones, "For What It's Worth" by Buffalo Springfield, "Low" by Flo Rida and T-Pain, and "Get Back" by Ludacris, were not present on the soundtrack, yet did appear in the film. The soundtrack features songs from The Temptations, MC Hammer, Creedence Clearwater Revival, Edwin Starr, and other artists. The single "Name of the Game" by The Crystal Method featuring Ryu has an exclusive remix on the soundtrack.

The soundtrack debuted 20th on Billboard's Top Soundtracks list and peaked at 39th on its Top Independent Albums list. James Christopher Monger of allmusic compared the music to other film's soundtracks such as Platoon, Full Metal Jacket, and Forrest Gump and called it "...a fun but slight listen that plays out like an old late-'70s K-Tel compilation with a few bonus cuts from the future."

== Track listing ==
Tropic Thunder: Original Motion Picture Soundtrack
| No. | Title | Writer(s) | Artist(s) | Length |
|---|---|---|---|---|
| 1. | "Name of the Game" (The Crystal Method's Big Ass T.T. Mix) | Ken Jordan, Scott Kirkland, Tom Morello | The Crystal Method | 5:11 |
| 2. | "Ball of Confusion (That's What the World Is Today)" | Barrett Strong, Norman J. Whitfield | The Temptations | 4:08 |
| 3. | "Run Through the Jungle" | John Fogerty | Creedence Clearwater Revival | 3:05 |
| 4. | "Sadeness (Part I)" | M.C.Curly, David Fairstein, Frank Peterson | Enigma | 4:13 |
| 5. | "U Can't Touch This" | Rick James, MC Hammer, Alonzo Miller | MC Hammer | 4:14 |
| 6. | "Ready Set Go" | Nick Grant | Ben Gidsjoy | 5:00 |
| 7. | "I Just Want to Celebrate" | Dino Fekaris, Nickolas Zesses | The Mooney Suzuki | 3:51 |
| 8. | "I'd Love to Change the World" | Alvin Lee | Ten Years After | 3:43 |
| 9. | "The Pusher" | Hoyt Axton | Steppenwolf | 5:48 |
| 10. | "Movin' on Up" | Jeff Barry, Ja'net Dubois | Ja'net Du Bois | 1:08 |
| 11. | "Frankenstein" | Edgar Winter | The Edgar Winter Group | 4:45 |
| 12. | "Sometimes When We Touch" | Dan Hill, Barry Man | Dan Hill | 4:08 |
| 13. | "War" | Strong, Whitfield | Edwin Starr | 4:08 |
| 14. | "I Love Tha Pussy" | Cisco Adler, Darryl Farmer, Micah Givens, Ronald Jackson, Brandon T. Jackson | Brandon T. Jackson | 3:23 |
