= Now Is the Time (disambiguation) =

Now Is the Time is a 1992 album by Alanis Morissette.

Now Is the Time may also refer to:

== Film ==
- Now Is the Time (film), a 2019 documentary film by Christopher Auchter

== Music ==
=== Albums ===
- Now Is the Time (Brenda Fassie album), 1996
- Now Is the Time (Delirious? album) or the title song (see below), 2006
- Now Is the Time (Idrees Sulieman album), 1976
- Now Is the Time (Jeff Lorber Fusion album), 2010
- Now Is the Time (Nightmares on Wax album), 2014
- Now Is the Time!, by Polysics, 2005
- Now Is the Time: Live at the Knitting Factory, by Alex Blake, 2000
- Now Is the Time or the title song, by Harold Melvin & the Blue Notes, 1977

=== Songs ===
- "Now Is the Time", by The Crystal Method, 1994
- "Now Is the Time", by Delirious? from The Mission Bell, 2005
- "Now Is the Time", by Flogging Molly from Anthem, 2022
- "Now Is the Time (Jimmy James song)", by Jimmy James and The Vagabonds, 1976
- "Now Is the Time", by Ray Brown & the Whispers, 1966
- "Now Is the Time", by Sisters Love
- "The Best Time of Your Life", often referred to by its first line, "Now Is the Time", from the Carousel of Progress from 1975-1993

== See also ==
- Now's the Time (disambiguation)
- Now is the time for all good men, a typing drill sometimes used as filler text
- The Time Is Now (disambiguation)
