= Coming Back =

Coming Back may refer to:

- Coming Back (film), directed by Lee Man-hee
- "Coming Back" (How I Met Your Mother), a 2013 television episode
- "Coming Back" (Juliet Bravo), a 1980 television episode
- "Comin' Back", a song by The Crystal Method
- "Coming Back", by Gotye from the album Like Drawing Blood
- "Coming Back", by Stephen Gately from the album New Beginning
