= Antonio Muñoz (actor) =

Guatemalan actor and motocross athlete

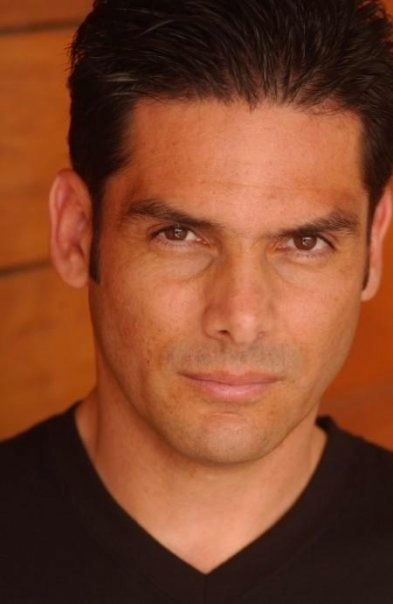
- Born: January 2, 1966 (age 60); Guatemala City, Guatemala
- Occupation: Actor
- Years active: 2002–present

Antonio Muñoz (born Jose Rafael Antonio Muñoz, January 2, 1966, in Guatemala City) is a Guatemalan actor and three-time national motocross champion.

Muñoz started racing motocross when he was eleven. During his third year of racing, he suffered a major accident, leaving him with major facial trauma and permanent loss of taste and smell called anosmia. Muñoz competed for twenty years as a motocross racer and held three national titles.

In 2002, Muñoz decided to pursue a career in acting, although he had no previous experience and within days he became a member of the Screen Actors Guild.

Muñoz had his first break after six months. Desmond Gumbs, the director of Straight Out (2003), (his first film) took a great risk on Muñoz's raw talent and cast him in a major plot-driver role. Since then, he has worked on top-rated shows, as well as in the feature films, The Rundown, Spanglish with Adam Sandler, and London.

Muñoz has been in television and editorial commercials including Bank of America, Nissan Altima and Infinity Insurance.

Muñoz then tried to pursue an acting career in the Hispanic-Latin market and he was soon given a feature role in the Telemundo production, El Rostro de Analía as a hitman for Gabriel Porras as Ricky Montana.

In June 2010, Muñoz is worked in Petén with Dr Richard D. Hansen, providing all the logistic and helicopters for the exploration of El Mirador, the largest Mayan ruins.

== Television ==
Year	Title	Role	Notes
2003	Nip/Tuck	Waiter	Episode "#1"
2003	Dragnet	Interpreter	Episode: "#2 season #2"
2005	Karen Sisco	Lover Guy	Episode "#9"
2005	Wanted	Father Oliviera	Episode "#11"
2007	Secretos	Humberto	Episode "#12"
2008	Camino a la Justicia	Miguel Angel	Episode "#32"
2009	El Rostro de Analía	Hitman	Episode "#146"

== Film ==
Year	Title	Role
2003	Straight Out	Gilbert
2003	The Rundown	Kontiki Rebel
2004	"Spanglish (film)"	Mexican at Family dinner
2005	London (2005 American film)	Killer in a Dream
