= Legion of Boom (album) =

Studio album by the Crystal Method
- Released: January 13, 2004
- Recorded: 2003
- Genre: Big beat; electronic rock
- Length: 59:17
- Label: V2
- Producer: The Crystal Method

The Crystal Method chronology
Community Service (2002)	Legion of Boom (2004)	Community Service II (2005)

The Crystal Method studio album chronology
Tweekend (2001)	Legion of Boom (2004)	Divided by Night (2009)

Singles from Legion of Boom
- 1. "Starting Over" Released: September 10, 2003; 2. "Born Too Slow" Released: November 25, 2003

Legion of Boom is the third studio album by American electronic music duo the Crystal Method. It was released on January 13, 2004, by V2 Records. The album features contributions from Milla Jovovich and Kyuss lead singer John Garcia, and also contains guitar riffs courtesy of Limp Bizkit guitarist Wes Borland (who also co-produced three tracks) and vocal talents by beatboxer Rahzel. Its title is likely a reference to the supervillain team Legion of Doom.

== Background ==
The album was nominated for a Grammy in the "Best Electronica/Dance Album" category in 2005, the first year that any award was given out for that category.

An edited version of "Born Too Slow" was featured in the soundtrack for the video games Need for Speed: Underground and Donkey Konga 2. The song "I Know It's You" was used in the pilot episode of the TV show Numbers. Also, the song "Bound Too Long" was featured on the soundtrack to the movie Cursed, and "Starting Over" was used in an episode of the TV show Alias and an episode of CSI: Crime Scene Investigation. "Weapons of Mass Distortion" was featured in the teaser and theatrical trailers of The Bourne Ultimatum and a different version of the same song, renamed "Weapons of Mad Distortion" was used in the film Blade: Trinity.

The album also contains the only known time either members of the Crystal Method have provided vocals for a song. The song that features this is "I Know It's You", which has Ken Jordan singing through a vocoder.

== Critical reception ==
Professional ratings
Aggregate scores
Source	Rating
Metacritic	58/100
Review scores
Source	Rating
AllMusic	3/5 stars
Alternative Press	2/5 stars
Blender	1.5/5 stars
E! Online	B
Entertainment Weekly	B−
Los Angeles Times	3/4 stars
Q	3.5/5 stars
Resident Advisor	4/5 stars
Rolling Stone	3/5 stars
The Rolling Stone Album Guide	3.5/5 stars
Spin	5/10

Upon release, Legion of Boom received mixed reviews from critics. The album has a score of 58 out of 100 from Metacritic based on "mixed or average reviews". Billboard gave it a mixed review and stated that "Too many tracks get bogged down with a straight-ahead progressive trance formula, where zoning out feels more suitable than attempting to move your feet. Still, because the good stuff is so darn good (and it is), it is easy to brush aside any missteps." Mojo gave it three stars out of five and said it was "more like the soundtrack to a horror movie than a night of DJ breaks and body shakes." Playlouder gave it two stars out of five and said the album "resembles nothing more than a U.S. major label executive's idea of what dance music should sound like." URB also gave it two stars and said that the band "has become utterly irrelevant." Blender gave it one-and-a-half stars out of five and stated: "The problem is not the lumbering, mid-tempo beats or the terrible lyrics (“Synthesizer, crystallizer, realizer”), although neither help. It's the sense that you've heard every synthesized squelch and ambient breakdown before."

== Track listing ==
No.	Title	Length
1.	"Starting Over"	4:01
2.	"Born Too Slow"	2:59
3.	"True Grit"	5:06
4.	"The American Way"	4:26
5.	"I Know It's You"	5:48
6.	"Realizer"	3:48
7.	"Broken Glass"	3:55
8.	"Weapons of Mass Distortion"	4:50
9.	"Bound Too Long"	6:23
10.	"Acetone"	5:15
11.	"High and Low"	5:23
12.	"Wide Open"	7:23
Total length:		59:17

DVD-A bonus tracks
No.	Title	Length
13.	"Born Too Slow (EK's Spider in the Corner Alt. Dub)"	6:15
14.	"Born Too Slow (Deepsky's Green Absinthe Dub)"	8:20

== Personnel ==
=== The Crystal Method ===
- Scott Kirkland – Producer, keyboards, drum programming (all tracks), vocals (through a vocoder) (track 5)
- Ken Jordan – Producer, keyboards (all tracks)

=== Musicians ===
- Robin Goodridge (Bush) – drums
- Rahzel – vocals (tracks 1, 4, and 10)
- John Garcia – vocals (track 2)
- Milla Jovovich – vocals (track 5)
- Lisa Kekaula – vocals (tracks 6 and 11)
- Hanifah Walidah – vocals (tracks 9 and 12)
- Wes Borland – guitar (tracks 2, 7, and 8)
- Jon Brion – guitar (track 6)
- DJ Swamp – turntables (track 4)
