= Now's the Time =

Now's the Time may refer to:

- "Now's the Time" (composition), by Charlie Parker
- Now's the Time (Sonny Rollins album), 1964
- Now's the Time (Shirley Scott album), 1967
- Now's the Time (New York Unit album), 1992
- Now's the Time (4 P.M. album), 1995
- Now's the Time (Billy Mitchell album), 1976
- Now's the Time (Houston Person and Ron Carter album), a1990
- Now's the Time!, a 2011 album by Tony Christie
- Now's the Time (Francissca Peter album), a 1989 album by Francissca Peter
- Now's the Time (film), a 1932 film starring Harry Barris

== See also ==
- Now Is the Time (disambiguation)
