= Spanglish (film) =

2004 film by James L. Brooks

- Theatrical release poster
- Directed by: James L. Brooks
- Written by: James L. Brooks
- Produced by: Julie Ansell; James L. Brooks; Richard Sakai
- Starring: Adam Sandler; Téa Leoni; Paz Vega; Cloris Leachman
- Narrated by: Aimee Garcia
- Cinematography: John Seale
- Edited by: Richard Marks
- Music by: Hans Zimmer
- Production companies: Columbia Pictures; Gracie Films
- Distributed by: Sony Pictures Releasing
- Release date: December 17, 2004
- Running time: 131 minutes
- Country: United States
- Languages: English; Spanish
- Budget: $80 million
- Box office: $55 million

Spanglish is a 2004 American romantic comedy-drama film written and directed by James L. Brooks, and starring Adam Sandler, Téa Leoni, Paz Vega, and Cloris Leachman.

In the film, Cristina Moreno, a Mexican-born Princeton candidate, writes about a significant year in her life when her mother Flor, a woman who left Mexico with her for a better life in America, worked for a family whose patriarch is a newly celebrated chef with an insecure wife.

The film was released in the United States on December 17, 2004, by Sony Pictures Releasing. It was a box-office bomb, grossing $55 million worldwide on an $80 million production budget. The film received mixed reviews from critics.

== Plot ==
In Cristina Moreno's Princeton University application essay, she tells the story of a year from her childhood and how it shaped who she is today.

In 1992, Flor Moreno, a Mexican single mother, moved to the United States ("economy class," according to Cristina's letter) to seek a better life for her and her daughter. Settling in a Latino community in Los Angeles, Flor has no need to learn English, though Cristina does.

Flor works two jobs to support them, but, as Cristina blossoms, realizes she needs to watch her more closely. So she gets a job as a housekeeper for John and Deborah Clasky; their children Bernice and Georgie; and Deborah's mother, Evelyn Wright.

John is a chef and easy-going family man. Deborah is a businesswoman who was laid off, so is now a stay-at-home mother. Evelyn is a retired singer who tends to drink to excess. Deborah is uptight, neurotic and insecure. She body-shames Bernice and bullies John by demanding he always back her up. He is torn between defending his kids' mental health and his domineering wife. Flor tries to build Bernice's self-confidence with small acts of kindness, especially when Deborah is harsh.

Flor gets on well with the Claskys despite the language barrier. When Deborah rents a house for the summer, she demands Flor live in while they are there, as commuting from LA to Malibu by bus is unfeasible. Faced with losing her job, Flor reluctantly agrees to bring Cristina to live with the Claskys for the summer. Cristina is instantly dazzled by the Claskys' wealthy lifestyle.

Deborah quickly attaches to the beautiful and personable Cristina, ignoring Bernice. Flor does not approve of the attention. John unwittingly angers Flor when he offers to pay the children a set amount for each bit of sea glass they find on the beach. Cristina earnestly searches for hours, earning $640 for her efforts.

Flor and John argue, with Cristina as an interpreter. Flor wants to leave because of the awkward family dynamic. To Cristina's delight, he convinces her to stay, and Flor starts an English course so she can better communicate with them. Deborah begins an affair with a real estate agent.

John is tipped off to a critic visiting his restaurant; not wanting the additional social pressures of being famed for his cooking, he unsuccessfully attempts to offer a good but not great dish. When John's restaurant subsequently receives an enthusiastic review, he stresses about maintaining standards, but Deborah is allegedly so happy with the news she has sex with John. She also secures Cristina a scholarship to Bernice's private school, upsetting Flor, who is concerned her daughter might become an outcast or lose her individuality there. As Cristina begs to attend the school, Flor agrees but feels that Deborah is overstepping her bounds and voices her concerns to John, who tells her he empathizes as Bernice's own mother does not support her.

Deborah allows Cristina to bring her private school friends over for a sleepover, telling Flor it is a study session although Cristina is expected home for a family event. The now-sober Evelyn confronts her daughter about her affair, warning her she will lose John and ruin her life if she does not stop.

Deborah confesses to John, who cannot face her and leaves. He encounters Flor, who has arrived to quit and retrieve Cristina. Since Cristina is asleep with her friends, John takes Flor to his restaurant, where he cooks for her, and they admit their feelings for each other but acknowledge they cannot have a relationship.

A desperate Deborah continuously tries to contact John, blaming Evelyn's failings as a parent for her behavior. They have a frank conversation during which they admit their faults and become closer.

The next day, Flor comes to take Cristina home and informs her that she has quit her job, which upsets her. John and Flor part amicably. On the way home, Flor further informs Cristina she cannot attend private school anymore, which leads her to have a public meltdown and accuse her of ruining her life.

After Cristina asks her mother for "space," Flor, having lost patience, tells Cristina she must answer an important question at such a young age: "Is what you want for yourself to become someone very different than me?" Cristina considers this on their bus ride home before they make up and embrace.

Cristina's essay to the Princeton committee concludes that, although being accepted would thrill her, she would not let it define her, as she is already her mother's daughter.

== Cast ==
- Adam Sandler as John Clasky
- Paz Vega as Flor Moreno
- Téa Leoni as Deborah Clasky
- Cloris Leachman as Evelyn Wright
- Aimee Garcia as the narrator (Adult Cristina Moreno)
  - Shelbie Bruce as 12-year-old Cristina
  - Victoria Luna as 6-year-old Cristina
- Sarah Steele as Bernice "Bernie" Clasky
- Ian Hyland as George "Georgie" Clasky
- Jake Pennington as Young George
- Cecilia Suárez as Monica
- Thomas Haden Church as Mike the Realtor
- Antonio Muñoz as Mexican at Family Dinner
- Spencer Locke as Sleepover Friend
- Sarah Hyland as Sleepover Friend

== Production ==
James L. Brooks cast Adam Sandler after seeing his more dramatic performance in Punch-Drunk Love.

Paz Vega could not speak English when filming began and an interpreter was on set during filming so that she could communicate with the director.

Cloris Leachman replaced Anne Bancroft, who dropped out of the part after four weeks of shooting because of illness.

According to cinematographer John Seale, over two million feet of film was shot; Kodak sent him two bottles of champagne out of appreciation. This was the most footage Seale ever shot on a film, and it wasn't surpassed until Mad Max: Fury Road in 2015.

== Reception ==
=== Box office ===
The film grossed $8 million at #3 during its opening weekend. It eventually grossed $42 million at the box office in the United States and another $12 million outside the US, which brings the worldwide total of $55 million. The film's failure was partly due to its competition with Lemony Snicket's A Series of Unfortunate Events, Ocean's Twelve, and Meet the Fockers.

=== Critical response ===
On Rotten Tomatoes, the film has an approval rating of 54% based on reviews from 168 of critics, with an average rating of 6/10. The critical consensus reads, "Paz Vega shines, and Adam Sandler gives a performance of thoughtfulness and depth, but Spanglish is ultimately undermined by sitcommy plotting and unearned uplift." On Metacritic it has a score of 48% based on reviews from 36 critics, indicating "mixed or average reviews". Audiences polled by CinemaScore gave the film a grade "B+" on scale of A to F.

Its proponents claim it is a moving portrayal of the difficulty of family problems and self-identity (and perhaps to a lesser extent the difficulties and rewards of cross-cultural communication). Some critics described the film as "uneven", "awkward," for example when "John and Flor attempt to bare their souls to one another ... [with] lots of words coming out of their mouths, but there doesn't seem to be a context", and "The supporting performers deserve better, especially ... Cloris Leachman, who's consigned to a demeaning role...[and] the butt of rather mean-spirited jokes."

== Accolades ==
Award	Category	Recipients	Result	Ref.
AARP Movies for Grownups Awards	Best Intergenerational Film	Spanglish	Nominated	
AARP Movies for Grownups Awards	Best Screenwriter	James L. Brooks	Nominated	
AARP Movies for Grownups Awards	Best Actress	Cloris Leachman	Nominated	
California on Location Awards	Assistant Location Manager of the Year – Feature Films	Kei Rowan-Young	Won	
German Dubbing Awards	Outstanding Newcomer Performance	Patricia Jahn	Won	
62nd Golden Globes Awards	Best Original Score	Hans Zimmer	Nominated	
Imagen Foundation Awards	Best Picture	Spanglish	Nominated	
Imagen Foundation Awards	Best Director – Film	James L. Brooks	Nominated	
Imagen Foundation Awards	Best Actress – Film	Paz Vega	Nominated	
Imagen Foundation Awards	Best Supporting Actress – Film	Shelbie Bruce	Won	
Phoenix Film Critics Society Awards	Breakout of the Year – On Screen	Paz Vega	Won	
Phoenix Film Critics Society Awards	Best Performance by Youth in a Leading or Supporting Role – Female	Sarah Steele	Won	
Satellite Awards	Best Actress in a Supporting Role, Comedy or Musical	Cloris Leachman	Nominated	
11th Screen Actors Guild Awards	Outstanding Performance by a Female Actor in a Supporting Role	Cloris Leachman	Nominated	
The Stinkers Bad Movie Awards	Worst Actress	Tea Leoni	Nominated	
The Stinkers Bad Movie Awards	Worst On-Screen Couple	Adam Sandler; Tea Leoni	Nominated	
Young Artist Awards	Best Family Film – Comedy or Musical	Spanglish	Nominated	
Young Artist Awards	Best Performance in a Feature Film – Young Actor Age Ten or Younger	Ian Donovan Hyland	Nominated	
Young Artist Awards	Best Performance in a Feature Film – Supporting Young Actress	Shelbie Bruce	Nominated	
Young Artist Awards	Best Performance in a Feature Film – Supporting Young Actress	Sarah Steele	Nominated	

== See also ==
- Spanglish
