= Shelbie Bruce =

American actress

- Born: Shelbie Carole Bruce; November 12, 1992 (age 33); Brownsville, Texas, U.S.
- Occupation: Actress
- Years active: 2002–2013

Shelbie Carole Bruce (born November 12, 1992) is an American former actress who had a lead role in the 2004 film Spanglish.

== Early life ==
Shelbie was born in Brownsville, Texas, where she was home-schooled and trained as a child model, but later moved to California, where she pursued her film career. Shelbie is Spanish and Mexican on her mother's side, and Scottish and Native American on her father's side. She considers herself to be Latina. She explains that the two most important things in her life are her family and Jesus Christ. She is fluent in English and Spanish.

== Career ==
Shelbie has guest-starred on Nickelodeon shows like Ned's Declassified School Survival Guide and Romeo!. She has also guest-starred on the medical drama ER. She got her big break when she starred in the 2004 film Spanglish in which she played the bilingual daughter of a housemaid who speaks only Spanish. Shelbie signed a deal with Claire's Boutique to have her own jewelry line, which launched on September 8, 2006. She was also a blogger for Mis Quince Magazine, which is an online publication about planning quinceañeras.

== Filmography ==
Year	Title	Role	Notes
2002	Providence	Young Sid	Episode: "The Sound of Music"
2004	The Mystery of Natalie Wood	Natasha at age 11	Voice, TV movie
2004	ER	Brandi	Episode: "White Guy, Dark Hair"
2004	Spanglish	Cristina Moreno	
2005	Ned's Declassified School Survival Guide	Patty	Episode: "Your Body & Procrastination"
2006	Romeo!	Stacy-Marie	Episode: "The Mrs. Landers Incident"
2008	Little Miss CEO Pilot	Nina Beck	TV movie
2008	Moonlight	Nicole	Episode: "Love Lasts Forever"
2008	Just Jordan	Page Parker	Episode: "Cool Guys Don't Wear Periwinkle"
2008	El Tux	Suzy Lopez	
2008	Lincoln Heights	Trina	Episode: "The New Wild Ones"
2010	Cougar Town	Glee Club Member #2	Episode: "Breakdown"
2011	Big Time Rush	Red Shirt Girl	Episode: "Big Time Single"
