= Drive: Nike + Original Run =

Drive: Nike+ Original Run

Remix album by The Crystal Method
- Released: June 28, 2006
- Genre: Electronica
- Length: 44:58
- Label: Tiny E Records
- Producer: The Crystal Method

The Crystal Method chronology
London Movie Soundtrack (2006)	Drive: Nike+ Original Run (2006)	Divided by Night (2009)

Drive is the product of The Crystal Method's teaming up with Nike. It is part of a series of mixes intended to assist joggers on their workout routines known as Original Run. The album is a nearly 45 minute continuous mix of ten tracks, some new, some remixes and edits of songs off of the London soundtrack and Community Service II. It was released on the iTunes Store on June 28, 2006 as one long track.

On June 26, 2007, the album received a physical release on CD, exclusive to Best Buy stores. On February 5, 2008, the album was released for sale at other stores as well. The tracks are separated but still presented as a continuous mix. The CD includes four bonus tracks, which are full length edits of tracks 4, 6, 8 and 9.

== Track listing ==
All tracks by The Crystal Method except where noted

1. "Starting Line" – 2:02
2. "It's Time" (Vocals by Angelo Hayes) – 4:51
3. "Roadhouse Blues (Original Dub)" – The Doors vs. The Crystal Method (Densmore, Krieger, Mazarek, Morrison) – 6:05
4. "It Hertz" (Harmonica by Jimmie Wood) – 5:17
5. "Do It (Dub Pistols Mix)" – 5:24
6. "Don't Stop" (Harmonica by Jimmie Wood) – 4:57
7. "Brand New Kicks" (Guitar by Richard Fortus) – 4:16
8. "Bad Ass (Rogue Element Mix)" – 5:24
9. "Glass Breaker (Force Mass Motion Mix)" – The Crystal Method feat. Charlotte Martin – 5:34
10. "Finish Line" – 1:03

=== Best Buy exclusive full length tracks ===
11. "It Hertz"
12. "Don't Stop"
13. "Bad Ass (Rogue Element Mix)"
14. "Glass Breaker (Force Mass Motion Mix)" – The Crystal Method feat. Charlotte Martin
