= The Time Is Now =

The Time Is Now may refer to:

== Music ==
=== Albums ===
- The Time Is Now (album), by Craig David, 2018
- The Time Is Now, by DJ Antoine, 2018
- The Time Is Now, by So Solid Crew, 2006

=== Songs ===
- "The Time Is Now" (John Cena song), 2005
- "The Time Is Now" (Moloko song), 2000
- "The Time Is Now", by Atreyu from In Our Wake, 2018
- "The Time Is Now", by Capsule from More! More! More!, 2008
- "The Time Is Now", by Giriboy, 2019
- "The Time Is Now", by the Golddiggers, used in the soundtrack for the film The Irishman, 2019
- "The Time Is Now", by Neil Diamond, the B-side of "Kentucky Woman", 1967
- "The Time Is Now", by Valanto Trifonos competing to represent Greece in the Eurovision Song Contest 2011

== Television episodes ==
- "The Time Is Now" (Criminal Minds: Suspect Behavior), 2011
- "The Time Is Now" (Millennium), 1998
- "The Time Is Now" (The Name of the Game), 1970

== Other uses ==
- The Time Is Now (radio program), a former program on Air America Radio
- The Time Is Now, a 2019 book by Joan Chittister

== See also ==
- Now Is the Time (disambiguation)
