= The Trip Home =

Studio album by The Crystal Method
- Released: September 28, 2018
- Recorded: Los Angeles, California
- Genre: Electronica; trip hop; breakbeat
- Length: 46:22
- Label: Tiny e

The Crystal Method chronology
The Crystal Method (2014)	The Trip Home (2018)	The Trip Out (2022)

Singles from The Trip Home
- 1. "Holy Arp"; 2. "There's a Difference"; 3. "Ghost in the City"

The Trip Home is the sixth studio album by American electronic music act The Crystal Method, and the first solo album by Scott Kirkland.

== Track listing ==
Digital download
No.	Title	Length
1.	"The Raze" (feat. Le Castle Vania)	3:25
2.	"Holy Arp"	3:17
3.	"Moment of Truth"	4:44
4.	"Ghost in the City" (feat. Le Castle Vania & Amy Kirkpatrick)	5:31
5.	"Turbulence"	4:46
6.	"Carry On"	1:34
7.	"The Drive Inside"	3:35
8.	"Chapter One" (feat. Teflon Sega)	2:43
9.	"Cabin Pressure" (feat. Matt Lange & Justin Chancellor)	5:02
10.	"There's a Difference" (feat. Franky Perez)	3:02
11.	"Hold on to Something" (feat. Teflon Sega & Delila Paz)	3:59
12.	"Let's Go Home"	4:44
Total length:		46:22
