= Community Service (album) =

Compilation album by The Crystal Method
- Released: July 23, 2002
- Genre: Electronica
- Length: 74:06
- Label: Ultra Records

The Crystal Method chronology
Tweekend (2001)	Community Service (2002)	Legion of Boom (2004)

Professional ratings
Review scores
Source	Rating
Allmusic	3/5 stars
Rolling Stone	(favorable)
The Rolling Stone Album Guide	2/5 stars
Urb	3.55/5 stars

Community Service is a continuous mix album released by American electronic dance music duo The Crystal Method. It features remixes of Crystal Method songs, remixes created by The Crystal Method, and songs from other artists. Remixed songs from popular bands Garbage, P.O.D., and Rage Against the Machine make appearances and the final track contains voice samples from The Matrix. A follow-up album, Community Service II, was released with a subsequent tour in 2005.

== Track listing ==
1. ILS - No Soul (PMT Remix) – 4:17
2. Evil Nine - Cake Hole – 5:50
3. Stir Fry - Breakin on the Streets (False Prophet Remix) – 3:54
4. Koma + Bones - Morpheus (Meat Katie and Dylan Rhymes Mix) – 3:41
5. Orbital - Funny Break (One Is Enough) (Plump DJ's Mix) – 5:20
6. Elite Force - Curveball – 4:00
7. Dastrix - Dude in the Moon (Luna Mix) – 6:04
8. The Crystal Method - Name of the Game (Hybrid's LA Blackout Remix) – 5:49
9. P.O.D. - Boom (The Crystal Method Remix) – 3:31
10. Ceasefire - Trickshot – 3:16
11. Rage Against the Machine - Renegades of Funk (The Crystal Method Remix) – 3:55
12. Garbage - Paranoid (The Crystal Method Remix) – 5:23
13. The Crystal Method - Wild, Sweet and Cool (Static Revenger Mix) – 4:24
14. Force Mass Motion vs. Dylan Rhymes - Hold Back – 4:37
15. The Crystal Method - You Know It's Hard (Koma + Bones Remix) – 6:40
16. Scratch-D vs. H-Bomb - The Red Pill – 3:24

== Personnel ==
- Jeff Aguila – Artwork
- Tom Beaufoy – producer
- Howard Benson – producer
- Billy Brunner – producer, remixing
- Ceasefire – arranger, producer
- Scott Christina – producer
- Michael Clark – producer, mixing
- The Crystal Method – producer, remixing
- Jake Devere – Production Assistant
- DJ Swamp – Scratching
- Andy Duckmanton – producer
- Elite Force – producer
- Douglas Grean – guitar
- Jim Kissling – engineer
- Mike Koglin – producer, mixing
- Koma & Bones – producer, remixing
- Chris Lord-Alge – mixing
- Meat Katie – producer, remixing
- Tom Morello – guitar
- David B. Noller – producer
- Rage Against the Machine – producer
- Dylan Rhymes – producer, remixing
- Rick Rubin – producer
- Static Revenger – producer, remixing
- Ralf Strathmann – Photography
- Scott Weiland – vocals

== In popular culture ==
- The remix of P.O.D.'s "Boom" was used in the 2003 video game Amplitude at the request of fans, and was also used in a trailer for the movie Crank: High Voltage.
