= Tweekend =

Studio album by the Crystal Method
- Released: July 31, 2001
- Recorded: 1999–2000
- Studio: The Bomb Shelter, Glendale, California
- Genre: Big beat; electronic; trip hop; electronic rock
- Length: 68:53
- Label: Outpost; Geffen
- Producer: The Crystal Method

The Crystal Method chronology
Vegas (1997)	Tweekend (2001)	Community Service (2002)

The Crystal Method studio album chronology
Vegas (1997)	Tweekend (2001)	Legion of Boom (2004)

Singles from Tweekend
- 1. "Blowout" Released: July 2, 2001; 2. "Name of the Game" Released: August 14, 2001; 3. "Murder" Released: November 26, 2001; 4. "Wild, Sweet & Cool" Released: December 5, 2002

Professional ratings
Aggregate scores
Source	Rating
Metacritic	62/100
Review scores
Source	Rating
AllMusic	3/5 stars
Alternative Press	3.5/5 stars
The Austin Chronicle	2/5 stars
Blender	3/5 stars
Drowned in Sound	8/10
E! Online	B
Entertainment Weekly	B−
Q	3/5 stars
Request	78/100
Rolling Stone	3/5 stars
The Rolling Stone Album Guide	2/5 stars
Spin	5/10

Tweekend is the second studio album by American electronic music duo the Crystal Method, released on July 31, 2001, by Outpost Recordings and Geffen Records. The album title is derived from the demise of the West Coast rave scene in the late 1990s and 2000s.

The album features the single "Name of the Game", which has been featured in many films, television series and commercials. The other two singles from the album were "Murder" and "Wild, Sweet and Cool".

== Commercial performance ==
Tweekend debuted at number 32 on the Billboard 200 in the United States, Crystal Method's highest position on that chart in their history. It also debuted at number 6 on the Canadian Albums Chart, selling 9,603 copies in its first week.

== Track listing ==
No.	Title	Music	Length
1.	"PHD"	Ken Jordan, Scott Kirkland	6:27
2.	"Wild, Sweet and Cool"	Jordan, Kirkland, Tom Morello	3:54
3.	"Roll It Up"	Jordan, Kirkland	6:02
4.	"Murder (You Know It's Hard)"	Jordan, Kirkland, Weiland	4:40
5.	"Name of the Game"	Jordan, Kirkland, Morello	4:15
6.	"The Winner"	Jordan, Kirkland	5:11
7.	"Ready for Action"	Jordan, Kirkland	5:01
8.	"Ten Miles Back"	Jonathan Gallivan, Jordan, Kirkland, Byron Wong	7:00
9.	"Over the Line"	Jon Brion, Jordan, Kirkland	6:54
10.	"Blowout"	Jordan, Kirkland	7:57
11.	"Tough Guy"	Jordan, Kirkland	11:32
Total length:			68:53

N.B.: Track 11 Contains a hidden track with a remix of "Name of the Game", after one minute of silence from Tough Guy.

=== Personnel ===
- Track 2 and 5: guitars by Tom Morello.
- Track 4: vocals by Scott Weiland, guitars by Doug Grean.
- Track 5: scratching by DJ Swamp.
- Track 5 and 7: vocals by Ryan "Ryu" Maginn.
- Track 8: vocals by Julie Gallios.

Note: Alternate versions of this album have "Murder" and "Over the Line" switched around.

The album was packaged with a bonus disc for the Australian/New Zealand tour with the track listing

1. "Busy Child (Überzone Mix)"
2. "Name of the Game (Hybrid Blackout in LA Mix)"
3. "Name of the Game (Eric Kupper's Deep Dub Mix)"
4. "You Know It's Hard (John Creamer & Stephane K Mix)"
5. "You Know It's Hard (Dub Pistols Dub Mix)"
6. "You Know It's Hard (Koma and Bones Mix)"

== Cover art ==
The cover is a direct homage to the album art of the Supertramp album Crisis? What Crisis?

== In popular culture ==
- "Name of the Game" was featured in various media, including feature films, television shows, video games, and commercials.
- "Roll It Up" has been used in Nissan and Adidas ads, an episode of Dark Angel, the film Zoolander, and the 2005 remake of The Longest Yard. It was also one of the main themes of the original Xbox game Mad Dash Racing, in the intro of the Jacksonville Chicago matchup on the NFL on CBS week 17 January 6, 2002. Moreover, it was used in Fast & Furious 6 (2013) during the introduction to Letty scene in London.
- "The Winner" was featured in the video games FreQuency and NBA Live 2002, the television series Dark Angel's finale episode "Freak Nation", and as the theme song for the former Cedar Point roller coaster Wicked Twister.
- "Wild, Sweet Cool" was used in various promo spots for the 2002 Winter Olympics.
- Selected tracks from this album were used in the Columbo episode "Columbo Likes the Nightlife" (2003).
