= The Crystal Method (album) =

Studio album by The Crystal Method
- Released: January 14, 2014
- Recorded: Los Angeles, California
- Genre: Electronica; trip hop; breakbeat
- Length: 48:14
- Label: Tiny e

The Crystal Method chronology
Divided by Night (2009)	The Crystal Method (2014)	The Trip Home (2018)

Singles from The Crystal Method
- 1. "Emulator" Released: October 2013; 2. "Over It" Released: December 2013

The Crystal Method is the fifth studio album by American electronic duo the Crystal Method. The album was released on January 14, 2014, although it was set to be released in 2013, but delayed due to Scott Kirkland's brain surgery in early 2013. The whole album was set as a free stream on Hype Machine on January 4, 2014. The cover, sleeve and digital booklet was designed by Bob Kadrie with band photography by Chapman Baehler. It is also Ken Jordan's final album with the group before retiring in 2017.

== Critical reception ==
Professional ratings
Review scores
Source	Rating
AllMusic	3/5 stars
Alternative Press	3.5/5 stars
The A.V. Club	B−
CraveOnline	7/10
Las Vegas Weekly	3/5 stars
Sputnikmusic	2.5/5 stars
USA Today	2/4 stars

The Crystal Method garnered a mixture of both positive and mixed ratings from music critics. At Alternative Press, Annie Zaleski rated it three-and-a-half stars, commenting that the album "Nods elsewhere to New Order's lurching bass, Daft Punk's robotic funk and crushing synthrock are just the cherry on top." Ian Robinson of CraveOnline rated it a seven-out-of-ten, calling it "a decent album, just not what I was hoping for from the dynamic duo of EDM." At The A.V. Club, Lily Moayeri graded it a B−, feeling that the album "is not a comprehensive listening album, but it's not meant to be." Gregory Heaney of Allmusic rated it three stars, writing that the band "are tied more to their mission than the means of completing it". At Las Vegas Weekly, Mike Prevatt rated it three stars, noting how the band "roars with a familiar vigor and distinction." Edna Gunderson of USA Today rated it two out of four stars, commenting that "many of these tracks [sound] desperate or dated."

== Track listing ==
Digital download
No.	Title	Length
1.	"Emulator"	5:14
2.	"Over It" (featuring Dia Frampton)	3:14
3.	"Sling the Decks"	4:50
4.	"Storm the Castle" (with Le Castle Vania)	4:22
5.	"110 to the 101"	5:46
6.	"Jupiter Shift"	5:03
7.	"Dosimeter" (with Nick Thayer)	6:16
8.	"Grace" (featuring LeAnn Rimes)	5:06
9.	"Difference" (featuring Franky Perez)	4:04
10.	"Metro"	1:26
11.	"After Hours" (featuring Afrobeta)	3:52
