= London (2005 American film) =

2005 American romantic drama film

- Theatrical release poster
- Directed by: Hunter Richards
- Written by: Hunter Richards
- Produced by: Ash Shaw; Paul Davis-Miller; Bonnie Timmermann
- Starring: Chris Evans; Jason Statham; Jessica Biel; Joy Bryant; Kelli Garner; Isla Fisher
- Cinematography: Jo Willems
- Edited by: Tracey Wadmore-Smith
- Music by: The Crystal Method
- Production company: Destination Films
- Distributed by: Samuel Goldwyn Films
- Release dates: September 3, 2005 (Montreal World Film Festival); February 10, 2006 (United States)
- Running time: 92 minutes
- Country: United States
- Language: English
- Box office: $20,361

London is a 2005 American romantic drama film written and directed by Hunter Richards. It stars Chris Evans, Jason Statham, Jessica Biel, Joy Bryant, Kelli Garner, and Isla Fisher.

== Plot ==
Syd (Chris Evans) receives a phone call from a friend informing him that his ex-girlfriend London (Jessica Biel) is having a going-away party before she moves to California with her new boyfriend in a few days. Syd, who has been deeply depressed since London dumped him, flies into a rage upon hearing the news, and wrecks his apartment. He decides to go to the party uninvited, bringing along Bateman (Jason Statham), a banker who delivers cocaine to Syd as a favor to their mutual dealer.

After arriving at the party at the condominium belonging to the parents of club girl Rebecca (Isla Fisher), Bateman and Syd install themselves in the bathroom, where they snort line after line of cocaine, guzzle tequila and discuss love, sex, God, women and pain. Over the course of the night and a massive pile of blow, Bateman tells Syd to get on with his life.

The private party-within-a-party is soon joined by Maya (Kelli Garner) and Mallory (Joy Bryant), who feign sympathy for Syd to grab some free cocaine. When Syd learns that London has arrived, Bateman challenges him to go out and talk to her.

After a heated confrontation in the middle of the party, Syd and London decide to leave to talk somewhere more private. As they are leaving, a fight ensues in which Syd and Bateman fight the other male guests, barely making it out of the party. London and Syd make up in Syd's car, and later they have sex in London's apartment. In the last scene, at the airport, Syd tells London he loves her. Although this impresses London, she still leaves him.

== Cast ==
- Jessica Biel as London
- Chris Evans as Syd
- Jason Statham as Bateman
- Joy Bryant as Mallory
- Kelli Garner as Maya
- Isla Fisher as Rebecca
- Dane Cook as George
- Louis C.K. as Therapist
- Casey LaBow as Dominatrix
- Kat Dennings as Lilly
- Lina Esco as Kelly
- Paula Patton as Alex
- Antonio Muñoz as Killer in a Dream

== Music ==
London (Original Motion Picture Soundtrack)

Soundtrack album by The Crystal Method
- Released: February 24, 2006
- Genre: Big beat
- Label: Reincarnate Music
- Producer: The Crystal Method

The Crystal Method chronology
Community Service II (2005)	London (Original Motion Picture Soundtrack) (2006)	Drive: Nike + Original Run (2006)

American electronica group The Crystal Method performed the score for the film.

The song "Roboslut" appears in the North American PlayStation 2 release of Dance Dance Revolution SuperNova, but is retitled "Robogirl" due to censorship.

Track listing

All songs written and performed by The Crystal Method except where noted.

1. "London"
2. "Restless" by Evil Nine featuring Toastie Taylor
3. "Smoked" (Vocals by Troy Bonnes)
4. "Fire to Me" (vs. Hyper)
5. "Roboslut"
6. "Defective"
7. "Vice"
8. "Crime" by Troy Bonnes
9. "C'mon Children" by The Out Crowd
10. "Onesixteen"
11. "Sucker Punch" by Connie Price and the Keystones
12. "Glass Breaker" (Vocals by Charlotte Martin)
13. "I Luv U"
14. "Nothing Like You and I" by The Perishers

== Reception ==
=== Critical response ===
On Rotten Tomatoes, the film has a 14% approval rating, based on 36 reviews, with an average rating of 3.7 out of 10. The website's consensus reads, "Hampered by pretension and undermined by unlikable characters, London proves that the novelty of seeing actors play against type isn't enough to rescue a deeply flawed film." On Metacritic, it has a weighted average score of 24 out of 100, based on reviews from 15 critics, indicating "generally unfavorable" reviews.

Roger Ebert of the Chicago Sun-Times gave the film one out of four stars, writing, "Chris Evans and Jason Statham have verbal facility and energy, which enables them to propel this dreck from one end of 92 minutes to the other, and the women in the movie are all perfectly adequate at playing bimbo cokeheads. I have seen all of these actors on better days in better movies, and I may have a novena said for them." Laura Kern of The New York Times called it "a misfired attempt at provocation and the exploration of philosophical thought, London is little more than an immature display of male bonding on speed."
