= Comin' Back =

Single by The Crystal Method featuring Trixie Reiss

from the album Vegas
- Released: July 27, 1998
- Genre: Big beat
- Label: Outpost; Sony Soho Square
- Songwriter(s): Scott Kirkland; Ken Jordan
- Producer(s): The Crystal Method

The Crystal Method singles chronology
"(Can't You) Trip Like I Do" (1997)	"Comin' Back" (1998)	"Blowout" (2001)

Music video
- Comin' Back on YouTube

"Comin' Back" is a song by American electronic music duo The Crystal Method, featuring American vocalist Trixie Reiss. It was released on July 27, 1998, as the fourth and final single from their debut studio album Vegas. It is their most successful release, reaching number one on the Billboard US Dance Club Chart in 1998.

The song also reached number 73 on the UK Singles Chart, and number 38 on the Billboard Dance/Electronic Songs chart.

== Music video ==
A music video for "Comin' Back" was released in 1998. It was digitally rereleased on their website on January 10, 2007, on their YouTube channel on 25 September 2007, and on their Vevo channel on 16 June 2009.

The video was directed by Peter Christopherson and features The Crystal Method members Scott Kirkland and Ken Jordan riding a cross-country high speed express train across the US.

== Track listing ==
US
No.	Title	Length
1.	"Comin' Back" (The Light's Southern Grit Mix)	8:53
2.	"Comin' Back" (Front BC's Comin' Twice Mix)	6:38
3.	"Comin' Back" (album version)	5:38

UK
No.	Title	Length
1.	"Comin' Back" (radio remix)	3:43
2.	"Busy Child" (radio edit)	4:08
3.	"Comin' Back" (Club 69 Funk Express)	9:10

== Charts ==
Chart performance for "Comin' Back"
Chart (1998)	Peak position
UK Singles (OCC)	73
US Dance Club Songs (Billboard)	1
US Dance/Electronic Songs (Billboard)	37
