= Vegas (The Crystal Method album) =

Studio album by the Crystal Method
- Released: August 26, 1997
- Genres: Big beat; techno
- Length: 61:10
- Label: Outpost
- Producer: The Crystal Method

The Crystal Method chronology
Vegas (1997)	Tweekend (2001)

Singles from Vegas
- 1. "Keep Hope Alive" Released: October 1, 1996; 2. "Busy Child" Released: August 15, 1997; 3. "Trip Like I Do" Released: October 6, 1997; 4. "Comin' Back" Released: July 27, 1998

Professional ratings
Review scores
Source	Rating
AllMusic	2.5/5 stars
Entertainment Weekly	A−
Christgau's Consumer Guide	(choice cut)
Mixmag	3/5
NME	5/10
PopMatters	6/10
Rolling Stone	3.5/5 stars
The Rolling Stone Album Guide	3/5 stars
Vibe	favorable
Wall of Sound	73/100

Vegas is the debut studio album by American electronic music duo the Crystal Method, released on August 26, 1997, by Outpost Recordings.

== Track listing ==
All tracks written by Ken Jordan and Scott Kirkland, except where noted.

=== US release ===
No.	Title	Length
1.	"Trip Like I Do"	7:34
2.	"Busy Child"	7:25
3.	"Cherry Twist"	4:25
4.	"High Roller" (Contains a short hidden track in the pregap)	5:29
5.	"Comin' Back" (with Trixie Reiss)	5:39
6.	"Keep Hope Alive"	6:12
7.	"Vapor Trail"	6:31
8.	"She's My Pusher"	5:41
9.	"Jaded" (with Trixie Reiss)	7:05
10.	"Bad Stone"	5:09
Total length:		61:10

=== UK release ===
No.	Title	Length
1.	"Trip Like I Do"	7:34
2.	"Busy Child"	7:25
3.	"Cherry Twist"	4:25
4.	"High Roller" (Contains a short hidden track in the pregap)	5:29
5.	"Comin' Back" (with Trudie Reiss)	5:39
6.	"Keep Hope Alive"	6:12
7.	"Vapor Trail"	6:31
8.	"She's My Pusher"	5:41
9.	"Jaded" (with Trudie Reiss)	7:05
10.	"Now Is the Time"	5:57
11.	"Bad Stone"	5:09
12.	"(Can't You) Trip Like I Do" (with Filter)	4:28

==== Sample credits ====
- "Busy Child" features portions of "Juice (Know the Ledge)" by Eric B. & Rakim.
- "High Roller" features samples of several NASA communications made during the Apollo 8 space mission.
- "Trip Like I Do" uses samples from the Jim Henson film The Dark Crystal, and the female vocals heard throughout the song were taken from an answering machine message that Scott Kirkland had received from a woman he met in a club.
- "Keep Hope Alive" contains elements from a speech by Jesse Jackson.
- "Bad Stone" features samples from two Bill Cosby stand-up routines, "Tonsils" and "Chicken Heart", which were both from his Wonderfulness album.

=== Deluxe edition ===
The Crystal Method celebrated the tenth anniversary of Vegas by re-releasing it in a special deluxe version on September 18, 2007. The new version of Vegas is a remastered double disc featuring rare, live, and remixed tracks in addition to the original 10-song album material. Remixes for the deluxe edition come courtesy of Paul Oakenfold, MSTRKRFT, Hyper, Sta, Deadmau5, Koma & Bones, Tom Real vs. The Rogue Element and Myagi. Also included is the original 1993 version of the Vegas single "Comin' Back" with the video for the album version along with the video for "Busy Child." Preceding the deluxe edition's release, "Busy Child [Sta Remix]" was made available on iTunes on August 28, 2007. The Myagi remix was used in the trailer for the movie Push.

Disc one

1. "Trip Like I Do" – 7:34
2. "Busy Child" – 7:25
3. "Cherry Twist" – 4:25
4. "High Roller" – 5:29
5. "Comin' Back" – 5:39
6. "Keep Hope Alive" – 6:12
7. "Vapor Trail" – 6:31
8. "She's My Pusher" – 5:41
9. "Jaded" – 7:05
10. "Bad Stone" – 5:09

Disc two

1. "Busy Child" (Sta Remix) – 6:43
2. "Trip Like I Do" (Tom Real vs The Rogue Element Remix) – 7:15
3. "Keep Hope Alive" (MSTRKRFT Remix) – 4:38
4. "Comin' Back" (Koma and Bones Remix) – 6:59
5. "Busy Child" (Hyper Remix) – 5:38
6. "Cherry Twist" (Deadmau5 Remix) – 6:04
7. "Busy Child" (Paul Oakenfold Remix) – 8:32
8. "High Roller" (Myagi Remix) – 6:41
9. "Comin' Back" ('93 Demo) – 5:04
10. "Vapor Trail" (Live) – 6:04
11. "Busy Child" (video)
12. "Comin' Back" (video)

==== Deluxe edition singles ====
- "Busy Child (Sta Remix)" is the first and only one of two official singles released from Vegas (Deluxe Edition). This is one of the better-known remixes from the album. After the release of Vegas (Deluxe Edition), the Crystal Method posted it on their Myspace page, and it remains there today. The single was released on August 28, 2007.
- "High Roller (Myagi Remix)" is another popular remix from Vegas (Deluxe Edition). Despite its popularity, it has not been released as a single. The song is known for being used in the trailer for the movie Push. On an internet poll in early 2009, people were asked which of the remixes from Vegas was their favorite. "High Roller (Myagi Remix)" won by a landslide. On the same site that conducted the poll (https://www.thecrystalmethod.org), a contest was set up to ask questions to Myagi himself by the public. He would choose what he thought were the best questions and use those in the interview. People selected could get a chance to get special prizes, like an autographed copy of Myagi's recent album, 3 Years of Sunrise. Even people who submitted questions were put into a drawing for prizes. "High Roller (Myagi Remix)" was also the only other remix from Vegas (Deluxe Edition) to be put on the band's Myspace page after the release of the album, besides "Busy Child (Sta Remix)". Like "Busy Child (Sta Remix)", the song "High Roller (Myagi Remix)" remains on the band's Myspace today.
- "Cherry Twist (Deadmau5 Remix)" is the second official remix single released from Vegas (Deluxe Edition), remixed by Deadmau5.

== Artists ==
- All production and mixing by the Crystal Method (Scott Kirkland and Ken Jordan).
- All tracks written and composed by Scott Kirkland and Ken Jordan, except "Comin' Back" and "Jaded", which were also co-written by Trudie "Trixie" Reiss.
- Vocals on "Comin' Back" and "Jaded" are performed by Trixie Reiss.

== In popular culture ==
"Busy Child" was on the soundtrack of Senseless, Lost in Space and in the movie Gone in 60 Seconds. "Keep Hope Alive" was featured in the film The Replacement Killers and the English dub of Dragon Ball Z: Lord Slug, it was used as the title theme for Third Watch. "Vapor Trail" was featured in the film 3000 Miles To Graceland (2001)

Several songs from the album were used in the game FIFA: Road to World Cup 98 and the soundtrack to the game N_{2}O: Nitrous Oxide, as well as some original songs and the track "Now Is the Time", which can be found on the UK version of the Vegas album. Also, on the Chef Aid album for South Park, a re-working of the song "Vapor Trail" is featured, including vocals from DMX, Ol' Dirty Bastard, Ozzy Osbourne, and new instrumentation by Fuzzbubble. The song has been renamed "Nowhere to Run", or sometimes "Nowhere to Run (Vapor Trail)".

Previously featured in an ad for the Mazda Miata, the song "High Roller" has more recently been used in some Victoria's Secret ads and Donkey Konga 2. It was also used in Lincoln commercials in 2008 and 2009, and is commonly heard at airshows featuring the USAF Thunderbirds. Most recently it appeared in the episode "Double Down" on A & E's Breakout Kings.

"Now is the Time" is best known for its inclusion in the Gran Turismo 2 soundtrack.
