= N2O (video game) =

1998 video game

- North American box art
- Developer: Gremlin Interactive (Note: (PlayStation Network ports for PSP, PlayStation 3 and Vita developed by Urbanscan))
- Publishers: NA: Fox Interactive; EU: Gremlin Interactive
- Designer: Antony Crowther
- Composer: The Crystal Method
- Platform: PlayStation
- Release: NA: 16 June 1998; EU: September 1998
- Genre: Tube shooter
- Modes: Single-player, multiplayer

N2O, subtitled as Nitrous Oxide in North America, is a 1998 tube shooter video game developed and published by Gremlin Interactive for the PlayStation. Fox Interactive released the game in North America. The soundtrack, composed by the American electronic music duo The Crystal Method, was heavily used to promote the game; the music is stored in Red Book format, meaning the game disc can be played as a music CD on an ordinary CD player.

== Plot ==
In the deep future, the Galaxy is at war. On planet Neptune, forces of evil in a tubular shaped circuit known as "The Torus" are creating gigantic mutated insects with the intent to invade and destroy Earth. Nitrous Oxide is a by-product of the insects incubation, and also serves as a high-octane fuel for the player's Tunnel Runner ship. The Tunnel Runner must eradicate the rapidly mutating insects before they become strong enough to invade Earth.

== Gameplay ==
N2O is a tube shooter in which the player shoots insects while collecting "E" coins, mushroom shields, and other psychedelically-themed weapon power-ups. As more insects are shot, the game increases speed. Players can collect more points by killing enemies in certain ways (such as shooting centipedes in the head) and by shooting the coins which appear when an enemy is killed to increase its value. Coins can be used to purchase shields, firewall powerups, and points at the end of each level. Besides the single player mode, N2O features a cooperative multiplayer mode with a shared screen or a split screen.

== Development ==
Producer Peter Dalton said that "We set out to create a game where the gameplay was simple on one level but completely absorbing and addictive on another."

The soundtrack was not added until the end of development, since publisher Fox Interactive wanted to sign a high profile techno band for the game's music.

== Reception ==
Reception

Aggregate score
Aggregator	Score
GameRankings	67%

Review scores
Publication	Score
AllGame	3.5/5
CNET Gamecenter	7/10
Electronic Gaming Monthly	6.375/10
Eurogamer	7/10
Game Informer	8.25/10
GameFan	90% (Note: In GameFan's viewpoint of the game, three critics gave it each a score of 96, 84, and 89.)
GameRevolution	B+
GameSpot	4.8/10
IGN	8/10
Next Generation	3/5
Official U.S. PlayStation Magazine	2/5

The game received average reviews according to the review aggregation website GameRankings. Next Generation said, "shooter fans who thrive on the ability to top their last high score time and time again won't be disappointed by this high energy blast-a-thon." The New York Times praised N2O for its aesthetics and smoothly seamless but fast-paced gameplay. They said that the game is similar in presentation to a Crystal Method concert and that the game is best played at high volume and in total darkness to maximize the audiovisual experience, and further remarked that the superior audio capacities of televisions (especially those attached to home theater systems) over typical computer systems is one of the advantages to restricting the game to the console market and not releasing it as a PC game. GamePro said, "In the end, N20 [sic] is definitely worth the price of admission, and is a great shooter for your library." (Note: GamePro gave the game 4/5 for graphics, 5/5 for sound, and two 4.5/5 scores for control and fun factor.)

The game shipped more than 100,000 units worldwide.

== Ports and re-releases ==
In October 2003, Zoo Digital Publishing purchased the rights to the game alongside other Gremlin Interactive titles from Atari and reissued the game in PAL regions under their "Zoo Classics" budget label at the end of the year. The company then released the title on the PlayStation Network in PAL regions on 10 January 2008, in North America on 1 June 2010; and Latin America on 13 August 2013.

Console Classics released the game under license of Urbanscan for Microsoft Windows via Steam on 29 June 2015, emulated through PCSXR. It was re-added to the platform via Pixel Games UK on 6 December 2022.
