= Name of the Game (The Crystal Method song) =

Single by The Crystal Method featuring Tom Morello, Ryan Maginn and DJ Swamp

from the album Tweekend
- Released: August 14, 2001
- Genre: Rap rock, electronic rock, big beat
- Length: 4:15
- Label: Geffen Records
- Songwriters: Scott Kirkland, Ken Jordan, Tom Morello, Ryan Maginn
- Producer: The Crystal Method

The Crystal Method featuring Tom Morello, Ryan Maginn and DJ Swamp singles chronology
"Blowout" (2001)	"Name of the Game" (2001)	"Murder" (2001)

Music video
- "Name of the Game" on YouTube

"Name of the Game" is the first single from The Crystal Method's second studio album, Tweekend. Despite the popularity of the song, The Crystal Method almost never play it live. The track features guitars by Tom Morello, vocals by Ryan "Ryu" Maginn, and scratching by DJ Swamp; it also contains samples from "Calling All Freaks" (1974) by Tina Dixon. The song enjoyed mainstream success as well as remixes by popular artists.

== Music video ==
The music video for the song (directed by Marcos Siega) features the exploits of the character Nosey, who is named so because his entire face is covered up by a giant nose. Scenes in the video depict Nosey participating in sports, breakdancing, and a relationship that falls apart quickly. He gets back to his friends to breakdance and they get to do some until the police arrive and arrest him for unknown reasons. At the end of the video, the words "to be continued ..." are shown. However, no known continuation of the "Nosey" story has yet to be produced.

== Track listing ==
CD

1. Radio Edit
2. Album Version
3. Instrumental

Vinyl

1. Eric Kupper's Deep Pump Mix
2. Hybrid's Blackout In L.A. Mix

Vinyl promo

1. Eric Kupper's Electrosphere Mix
2. Hybrid's L.A. Blackout Mix

== In popular culture ==
To date, the song has been featured in numerous different forms of media, including:

- Used in the 2001 Malcolm in the Middle episode "Charity"
- Used in the soundtrack for the film adaptation Resident Evil
- Used in one of the climactic scenes in the 2002 film Blade II and its 2004 sequel Blade: Trinity
- The 2002 film Half Past Dead
- The 2002 film Ballistic: Ecks vs. Sever
- Used for the intro and ending credits of the 2002 video game Tom Clancy's Splinter Cell.
- Playable in PS2 and Xbox versions of 2004 video rhythm game Pump It Up Exceed.
- Used in the 2004 indie film Chicago Boricua
- Episodes of Dark Angel
- Episodes of NCIS
- The 2004 unaired pilot for the TV series Fearless, starring Rachael Leigh Cook
- Played in the trailer for the 2007 film Live Free or Die Hard
- Intro music used by The Amazing Johnathan for some live performances
- In 2006 Hummer ads
- The 2008 film Drillbit Taylor
- The Crystal Method remixed "Name of the Game" for the 2008 film, Tropic Thunder. The remix, called "The Crystal Method's Big Ass T.T. Mix", is similar to the original, with samples of the character's voices included in the track. The track was played in the film, though the character's voice samples were taken out. The full remix is played during the credits.
- The trailer of the 2009 film Crank: High Voltage
- Used in the Cinema mod for Max Payne 2
