= Born Too Slow =

Single by the Crystal Method

from the album Legion of Boom
- Released: December 9, 2003
- Recorded: 2003
- Length: 2:59
- Label: V2
- Songwriters: Scott Kirkland; Ken D. Jordan; Wes Borland
- Producer: The Crystal Method

The Crystal Method singles chronology
"Starting Over" (2003)	"Born Too Slow" (2003)	"Smoked" / "Glass Breaker" (2006)

Music video
- "Born Too Slow" on YouTube

"Born Too Slow" is the first single released from the Crystal Method's third studio album, Legion of Boom. The song features the vocals of Kyuss lead singer John Garcia and guitar by Limp Bizkit's Wes Borland. The song was first featured on EA's Need for Speed: Underground in 2003, with the single being released later that year. The song has also been featured in Gran Turismo 4 and Donkey Konga 2. In 2006, it was featured in the film Annapolis.

== Music video ==
The music video was directed by Gore Verbinski, director of such films as The Mexican, The Ring, and the Pirates of the Caribbean series. Verbinski liked the song so much, he asked The Crystal Method if he could direct the video for it. Wes Borland makes a cameo appearance as a man using a pay phone. Fitness expert Billy Blanks Jr. starred in the video as the silver man. Scott Kirkland and Ken Jordan also cameo as the two men in line after the silver man gets his drink.

== Track listing ==
=== CD ===
(Released December 9, 2003)

1. Erick Morillo Main Mix (7:03)
2. Erick Morillo Dub Mix (7:03)
3. Deepsky's Green Absinthe Dub Mix (8:12)
4. NuBreed Remix (6:58)
5. EK's Spider in the Corner Alt. Dub Mix (6:11)

=== Vinyl 12" ===
(Released November 25, 2003)

1. Erick Morillo Main Mix (7:03)
2. Erick Morillo Dub Mix (7:03)

=== Vinyl 12" (Remixes) ===
(Released December 9, 2003)

1. Deepsky's Green Absinthe Dub Mix (8:12)
2. NuBreed Remix (6:58)
3. EK's Spider in the Corner Alt. Dub Mix (6:11)

== Charts ==
=== Weekly charts ===
Weekly chart performance for "Born Too Slow"
Chart (2003–2004)	Peak position
Australia (ARIA)	84
UK Singles (OCC)	76
UK Dance (OCC)	5
UK Indie (OCC)	8
US Alternative Airplay (Billboard)	26
US Dance Club Songs (Billboard)	3

=== Year-end charts ===
Year-end chart performance for "Born Too Slow"
Chart (2004)	Position
US Modern Rock Tracks (Billboard)	98
