= Keep Hope Alive =

1996 single by The Crystal Method

Single by The Crystal Method

from the album Vegas
- Released: October 1, 1996
- Recorded: 1996
- Genre: Big beat
- Length: 6:12
- Label: City of Angels; Moonshine
- Songwriters: Ken Jordan; Scott Kirkland
- Producer: The Crystal Method

The Crystal Method singles chronology
"Now Is the Time" (1995)	"Keep Hope Alive" (1996)	"Come2gether" (1996)

"Keep Hope Alive" is a single featured on the studio album Vegas by the electronica group The Crystal Method. The single was released on October 1, 1996, on the City of Angels label, and received 4.5 out of five stars in a review from AllMusic. The single was re-released on July 10, 2001, on the Moonshine Music label. Vocal samples for the song are taken from a 1992 speech by Jesse Jackson titled "You Do Not Stand Alone".

== In popular culture ==
"Keep Hope Alive" is used in an early action sequence, and found on the soundtrack, for the movie The Replacement Killers. It is also heard in a disco scene in the 1995 film Species. It is used as the theme song for the TV show Third Watch and is frequently heard on Ninja Warrior. The song is featured in the video games FIFA: Road to World Cup 98, Project Gotham Racing 4 and Motor Mayhem. A live version of the song is featured on the Family Values Tour 1999 CD.

The Third Watch episode "True Love" as well as FIFA: Road to World Cup 98 also used their earlier song "Now Is the Time".

"Keep Hope Alive" was a selectable song to play while aboard the Hollywood Rip Ride Rockit roller coaster at Universal Studios Florida in Orlando, Florida.

It was the main theme for the now defunct brazilian Cyberscript IRC client, playing during startup.

== 1996 track listing ==
1. "Keep Hope Alive" (There Is Hope Mix)
2. "Keep Hope Alive" (Trip Hope Mix)
3. "More"
4. "Now Is the Time" (The Olympic Mix)
5. "The Dubeliscious Groove" (Fly Spanish Version)

== 2001 track listing ==
1. "Keep Hope Alive" (There Is Hope Mix)
2. "Keep Hope Alive" (Trip Hope Mix)
3. "More '99 Mix"
4. "Now Is the Time" (The Olympic Mix) (Live)
5. "Now Is the Time" (Secret Knowledge Overkill Mix)
6. "The Dubeliscious Groove" (Fly Spanish Version)
