= DJ Swamp =

American DJ

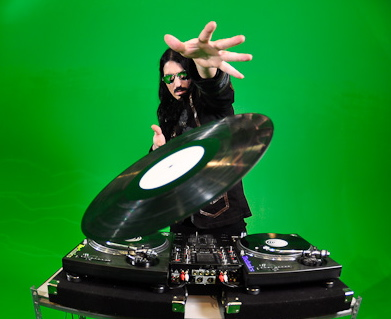
- DJ Swamp

Background information
- Born: Ronald K. Keys Jr.
- Origin: Cleveland, Ohio, US
- Genres: Hip hop, electronic
- Occupation: Disc jockey
- Instruments: Turntables, vocals, Sampling
- Years active: 1996–present
- Labels: Decadent; Guidance; Sesame Workshop Records; Warner Bros. 20th Records
- Website: djswamp.com

Ronald K. Keys Jr. aka DJ Swamp is an American hip hop DJ, turntablist, producer and vocalist. He was born in Cleveland, Ohio, United States. He currently resides in Los Angeles, United States. In 1996, he won the title of US DMC Champion, his first year entering the tournament. Swamp toured with Beck for four years and later broke away into a solo career with his release "Never is Now" in 2001. Alternative Press gave "Never is Now" an 8/10 rating.

His follow-up, a drum 'n' bass EP, Instruments of Torture, was recorded with Jack Dangers of Meat Beat Manifesto. Vinyl Disciple produced several music videos, including four 3D music videos. The music video for "The Leaders will Follow" is the first music video to incorporate 3D video scratching. His music video for "Rock Rollin'" features Dave England of Jackass fame.

== Career ==
In 1996, as a first time entry, he won the DMC US DJ Championship. He ended his set using pitch manipulation to play Deep Purple's "Smoke on the Water", followed by him smashing his records.

After winning the 1996 US DMC Championships, Swamp found himself still driving a street sweeper for a living in Ohio. He was making calls looking for gigs and a chance to break into the music scene full-time when he heard Beck was going to be in town. He formulated a plan to pose as a reporter and slip in a demo of him mixing and scratching Beck's tracks. He waited for Beck all day but never got to meet him. He did, however, give his demo tape to Beck's publicist. A few weeks later Beck called Swamp and he joined the tour as Beck's DJ. The two toured together for four years.

From 2016–2018 DJ Swamp toured as a member of the band Ministry.

== Solo career ==
After years of touring with Beck, DJ Swamp released his first album, "Never is Now", which was supported by the successful single "Worship the Robots." The song featured Simple Text voice Fred as the rapper. The text application vocals were chopped up and manipulated to make it more like rap than just spoken text. Also on the album was "Disintegrator" which was featured in the movie "Orgazmo" and appeared on the Original Motion Picture Soundtrack.

As a solo artist DJ Swamp has opened for artists such as Daft Punk, The Prodigy, Bassnectar, Nero, The Crystal Method, Fatboy Slim, The Chemical Brothers, Mix Master Mike, Datsik, Diesel Boy, Outkast, Fuel, Method Man and Redman.

Swamp has built a loyal following around the world appearing in festivals, rock shows, hip-hop shows and even raves. His stage performance consists of him Mixing, Scratching, Magic Tricks and even Emceeing. Crowds are often overwhelmed by his stage presence, heavy bass sound, crowd interaction and give-a-ways.

DJ Swamp's scratching can be heard throughout the movie Thirteen which won an Academy Award and was the first movie for director Catherine Hardwicke of Twilight fame. He was featured in the DJ documentary Scratch and the motion picture Clockstoppers.

In 1996 DJ Swamp formed Decadent Records, which allowed him to distribute his scratch tools vinyl and digital releases. Under this label he invented several DJ tools that are considered standards, including his infamous "skip-proof scratch tool" records which have the same sample repeated over and over in a straight line so that if the needle is bumped it will land on the same sample. A technique that has been copied by most battle breaks and scratch records and are a staple in many turntablist sets.

== Discography ==
=== Releases ===
- Swamp Breaks Decadent Records 1996
- Waxcraft Decadent Records 1997
- The Skip-Proof Scratch Tool Volume 1 Decadent Records 1997
- The Neverending Breakbeats Decadent Records 1997
- The Skip-Proof Scratch Tool Volume 2 Decadent Records 1998
- The Neverending Breakbeats Volume 2 Decadent Records 1998
- The Skip-Proof Scratch Tool Volume 3 Decadent Records 2000
- The Neverending Breakbeats Volume 3 Decadent Records 2000
- The Skip-Proof Scratch Tool Volume 4 Decadent Records 2001
- Never Is Now Lakeshore Records 2001
- Feed The Hands That Bite You/Challenger Incident Universal Mastering Studios 2002
- Infinite House Loops Vol. 1 Decadent Records 2002
- Never Ending Drum & Bass Loops Decadent Records 2003
- The Neverending Breakbeats Volume IV Decadent Records 2003
- Skip-Proof Scratch Tool Volume 5 Decadent Records 2005
- Never Ending Drum & Bass Loops Vol. 2 Decadent Records 2006
- Instruments of Torture Decadent Records 2006
- Scratch Tools On CD Decadent Records 2006
- Tons Of Tones Decadent Records 2007
- Sublevel Breaks Decadent Records 2008
- Vinyl Disciple (LP) Decadent Records 2011
- For Medicinal Use Only (7") Ruined Vibes 2015

=== Production ===
- Mope (Single) ? (2 versions) Mope (The Swamp Remix) Geffen Records ... 2000
- Peppermint (CD, Album) 240 Mango & Sweet Rice 2000

== Appears on ==
- Bastard Eyes by Zilch, "Scratch Your Number (DJ Swamp Remix)" and "Sleasy Jesus (DJ Swamp, Ray McVeigh & Ryder Remix)" 1999
- Kerosene (CD, Maxi) Something To Do Slipdisc Records 1999
- Mope (CD, Maxi, Enh) Mope (The Swamp Remix) Geffen Records 2000
- 1 Giant Leap (CD, Album, Plu) Braided Hair, Passion Festival Mushroom Records 2001
- Brand New History (Album) ? (3 versions) Restless Records ... 2001
- Rockin' the Suburbs (Album) ? (4 versions) Rockin' the Suburbs Epic 2001
- The Attraction to All Things Uncertain (Album) ? (2 versions) Six Degrees Records ... 2001
- United States Of Consciousness Six Year Anniversary (CD) Crowd Control Consciousness Records 2002
- Legion Of Boom (Album) ? (2 versions) The American Way V2 Records ... 2004
- Mr. Anonymous (CD, Album) Not On Label 2005
- Attention Cherie (12") Out Hear Audio 2009
- The Spirit Of Apollo (CDr, Album, Promo) N.A.S.A Music Anti - 2009
- Remixes Vol. 1 (File, MP3, 160) N.A.S.A. Music (LA Rio ... Not On Label (LA Riots Self-Released)
- Project 11 Volume 1 (CD, Maxi) Spiraling (Original), ... Hot Sauce Records 2005
- Year of the Snitch by Death Grips (Album) Third Worlds 2018
