= Busy Child =

Single by The Crystal Method

from the album Vegas
- Released: August 15, 1997
- Genre: Electronic breakbeat
- Label: Outpost Recordings
- Songwriters: Scott Kirkland, Ken D. Jordan
- Producer: The Crystal Method

The Crystal Method singles chronology
"Come2gether" (1996)	"Busy Child" (1997)	"High Roller" (1997)

"Busy Child" is a breakbeat single by The Crystal Method from the album Vegas. It is one of the group's most recognizable works, reaching #17 on Hot Dance Club Play charts, and remaining on even ten years later.

== Music videos ==
At least two music videos were made to promote the song. The original 1997 version (directed by Lance Bangs and Eli Bonerz) was mostly CGI. The second version (directed by Clark Eddy) is more recognizable and includes live concert footage interspersed with clips from the Lost in Space movie.

== Track listing ==
1. "Busy Child" (radio edit)
2. "Busy Child" (Vegas version)
3. "Busy Child" (Taylor's Hope for Evolution)
4. "Busy Child" (Uberzone mix)

== In popular culture ==
"Busy Child" is prominently featured in the opening sequence of the 2000 action film Gone in 60 Seconds and was a selectable song to play while aboard the now-closed Hollywood Rip Ride Rockit roller coaster at Universal Studios Florida in Orlando, Florida. It is also featured in EA Sports video game FIFA: Road to World Cup 98 and Konami’s Dance Dance Revolution MAX2.
