= The Crystal Method =

American electronic music duo

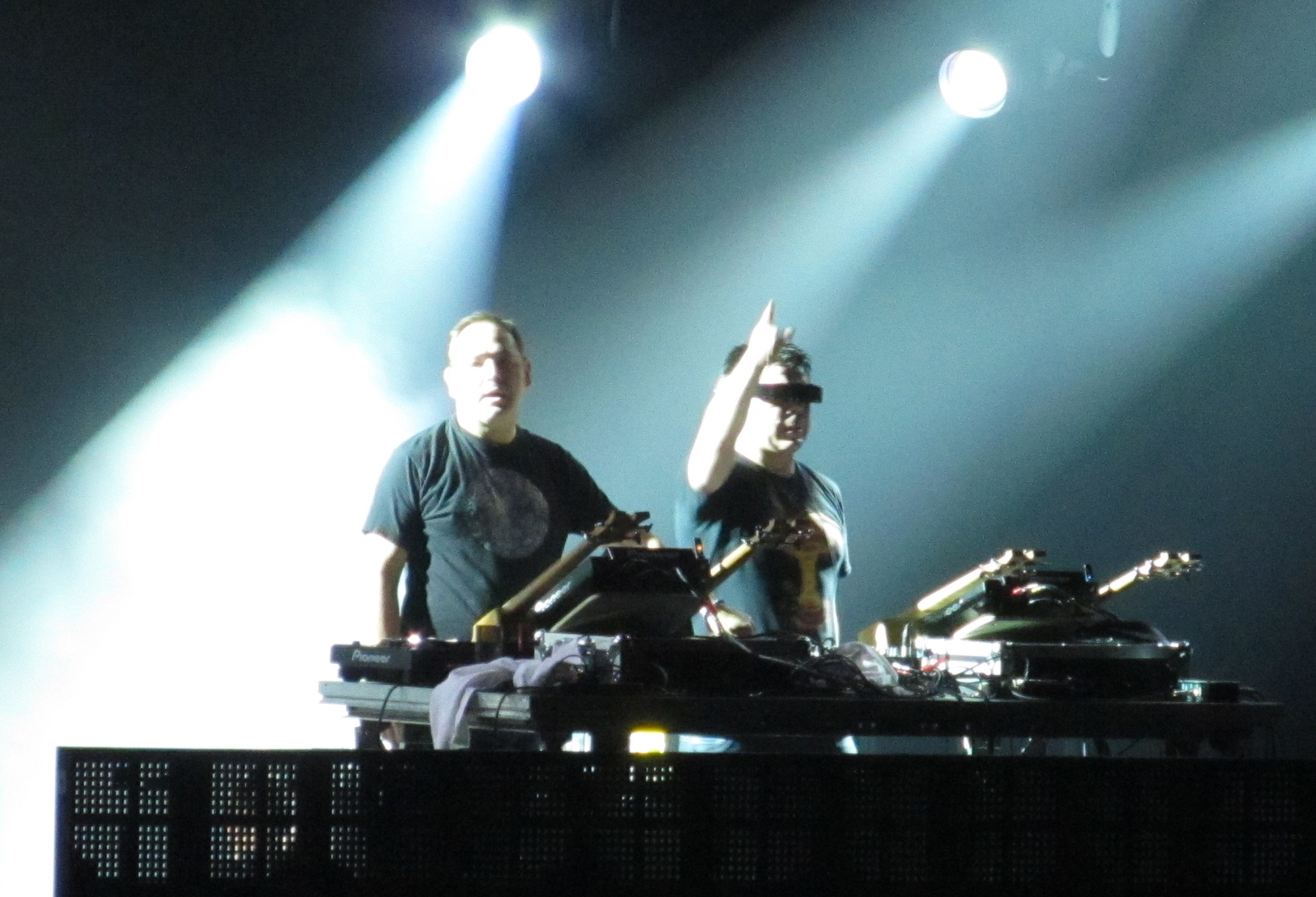
- The Crystal Method performing at Lollapalooza, 2012

Background information
- Origin: Las Vegas, Nevada, U.S.
- Genres: Big beat; alternative dance; trip hop; electronic rock
- Years active: 1993–present
- Labels: Outpost; Geffen; V2; Tiny E; Ultra; Immortal; Epic
- Members: Scott Kirkland
- Past members: Ken Jordan
- Website: thecrystalmethod.com

The Crystal Method is an American electronic music act formed in Las Vegas, Nevada, by Scott Kirkland and Ken Jordan in 1993. They were pioneers of the breakbeat genre and their music has appeared in numerous TV shows, films, video games, and advertisements. Their 1997 debut studio album Vegas was certified platinum in 2007, and saw follow-ups Tweekend, Legion of Boom, Divided by Night, and The Crystal Method.

In 2017, Jordan retired from music and left the group, with Kirkland adopting The Crystal Method as a solo moniker.

== History ==
The Crystal Method originally had two members, Scott Kirkland and Ken Jordan. Before The Crystal Method was formed, Kirkland and Jordan started working on music while working at a grocery store. Jordan was also a local DJ in Las Vegas as well as the college radio program director at UNLV. Jordan taught Kirkland how to DJ, and when Jordan moved to Los Angeles to work for a producer, Kirkland took over his job DJing at the local club. Kirkland also moved out to Los Angeles, and they formed The Crystal Method in 1993.

While working as a production duo for a rapper, a person named Crystal would handle transportation needs. The rapper repeatedly referred to her method of transportation as "The Crystal Method." The pair adopted the name based on the layout of the three words and the sound of the name.

=== Early days (1993–1995) ===
By the early 1990s, Jordan and Kirkland were renting a house together, in La Crescenta, Glendale, California, which had a small underground shelter beneath the front lawn. Originally intending to turn the shelter into a studio, it proved to be an unrealistic idea and the duo set up a studio in their house which was located near a Foothill (210) Freeway overpass. They subsequently named their studio The Bomb Shelter. They were interviewed on the front lawn of the house in the documentary Better Living Through Circuitry.

After The Bomb Shelter was built, a tape of The Crystal Method's music found its way to British DJ Justin King. King was interested in starting a record label that would showcase American electronic dance acts. Together with Steve Melrose, King formed the record label City of Angels. The first official release from the City of Angels label was The Crystal Method's "Now is the Time". The Crystal Method were signed to Outpost Recordings in 1996.

=== Vegas (1996–1998) ===
After the band signed with Outpost, they began working on their debut album. The group's final single on the City of Angels Record Label was "Keep Hope Alive". Their next single was "Come2gether", from the Mortal Kombat: More Kombat soundtrack.

On August 26, 1997, The Crystal Method released their debut studio album, Vegas. Vegas peaked at number 92 on the Billboard 200. It was certified gold by the RIAA in 1998, then platinum in 2007.

The album's release was supported by its four singles ("Keep Hope Alive", "Trip Like I Do", "Busy Child", and "Comin' Back") and by the inclusion of eight of its tracks on the soundtrack for the video game N2O. The game's publisher, Fox Interactive, sponsored The Crystal Method's 1998 tour. Jordan said that in live performances, "We definitely go for intensity. We're not interested in making our shows look like reality. We're interested in making the most intense and dynamic experience you've ever been through."

A reworking of "Trip Like I Do", called "(Can't You) Trip Like I Do", was also included as a collaborative effort with Filter on soundtrack to the film adaptation of Spawn in 1997 and on the soundtrack of Michael Benveniste's Tedd Can chronicles.

=== Tweekend (1999–2002) ===
In 1999, the band recorded their second studio album, Tweekend, which featured more guest artists than Vegas. The album was released in July 2001, and peaked at number 32 on the Billboard 200, which remains the group's highest album chart position to date.

Featured guests from the album include Rage Against the Machine guitarist Tom Morello, Stone Temple Pilots vocalist Scott Weiland, and others, like Doug Grean, DJ Swamp, Ryan "Ryu" Maginn, and Julie Gallios. Four singles were released from Tweekend: "Wild, Sweet and Cool", "Murder", "Blowout", "Name of the Game".

Jordan and Kirkland formerly ran a radio show called Community Service which aired Friday nights on radio station Indie 103.1, in California. They played music and hosted guests including Death in Vegas and Unkle.

A year after the release of Tweekend, The Crystal Method released a continuous mix album based on their radio show, titled Community Service. The album does not feature any new studio material from The Crystal Method, but is composed of remixes of bands like P.O.D., Rage Against the Machine, and Garbage, plus remixes of songs from Tweekend. Their remix of P.O.D.'s "Boom" from this album, also appeared in the video game Amplitude.

Community Service peaked at number 160 on the Billboard 200, number five on the Top Electronic Albums chart, and number 15 on the Top Independent Albums chart.

=== Legion of Boom (2003–2005) ===
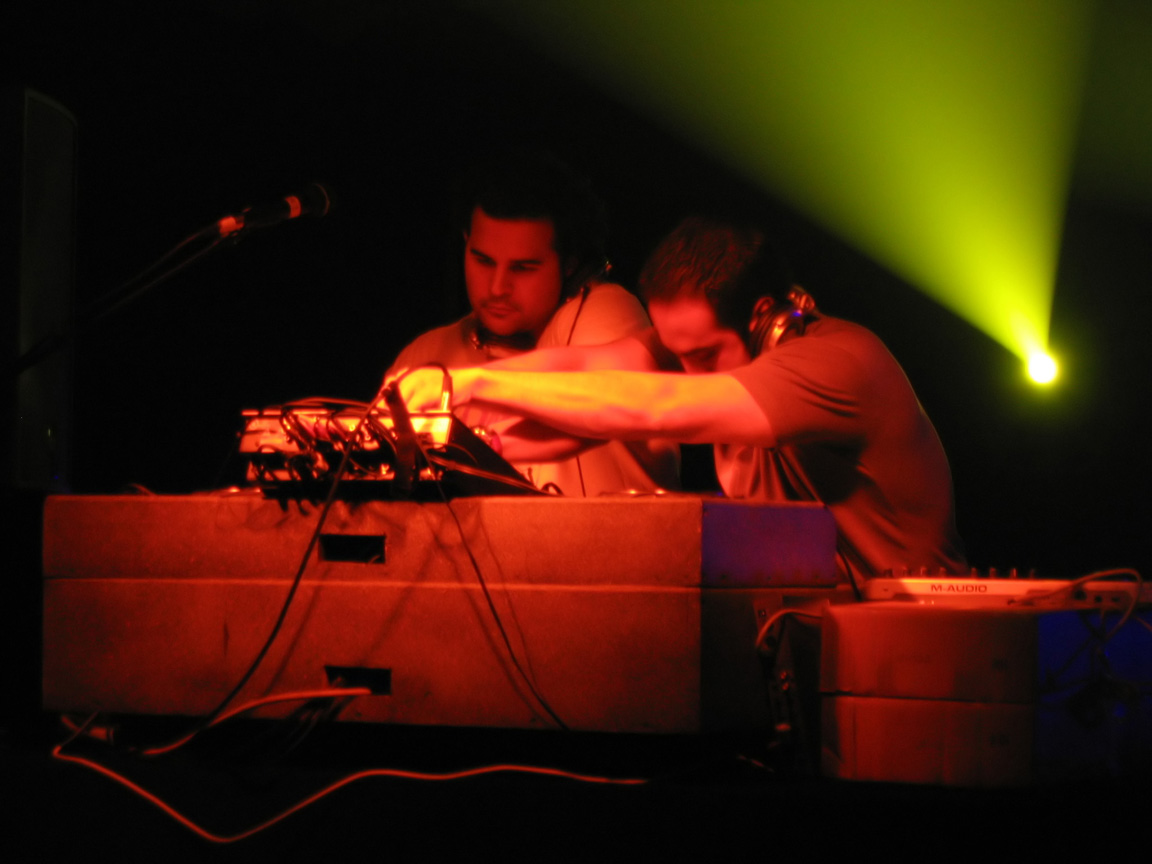
The Crystal Method performing in 2006

After the release of Community Service, The Crystal Method went back into the studio to record their third album, Legion of Boom. During the recording, they used the house as their recording studio instead of The Bomb Shelter.

In December 2003, the single "Born Too Slow", with vocals from John Garcia and guitar by Wes Borland was released. Legion of Boom was released on January 13, 2004, and peaked at number 36 on the Billboard 200. It sold over 25,000 copies in its first week. The track was also part of the soundtrack of the 2003 video game Need for Speed: Underground, used prominently in its demo.

The other single released from Legion of Boom, "Starting Over", featured vocals from Rahzel. No other singles were released but other songs, including "Weapons of Mass Distortion", "Bound Too Long" and "Realizer", appeared in various movies and TV shows. "I Know It's You" appeared in the trailer for the film Resident Evil: Extinction, and includes vocals from Milla Jovovich.

In 2005, the album was nominated for the Best Electronic/Dance Album Grammy, the first year that category existed. It lost to Kish Kash by Basement Jaxx.

Around this time, Jordan and Kirkland formed their own record label, called Tiny E Records. Also in 2005, Jordan and Kirkland composed an original theme for the TV series Bones, which remained in use for seven seasons before Jordan and Kirkland remixed the theme which has been in use since the beginning of season 8.

In 2004, The Crystal Method collaborated with Alan Parsons, on his fourth solo album since the demise of the Alan Parsons Project, A Valid Path, on the song "We Play The Game".

On April 5, 2005, The Crystal Method released their sequel to Community Service, titled Community Service II, another continuous mix of electronica songs and remixes of music by artists including The Doors, Unkle, New Order and Smashing Pumpkins. The album peaked at number 31 on the Top Independent Albums chart and number 8 on the Top Electronic albums chart.

A 5 track EP, Community Service II Exclusives, was released through the iTunes Store. It included one new track, "Badass", and full versions of four tracks from Community Service II. It was removed from the iTunes store not long after it was released.

=== Drive, London, and Vegas re-release (2006–2008) ===
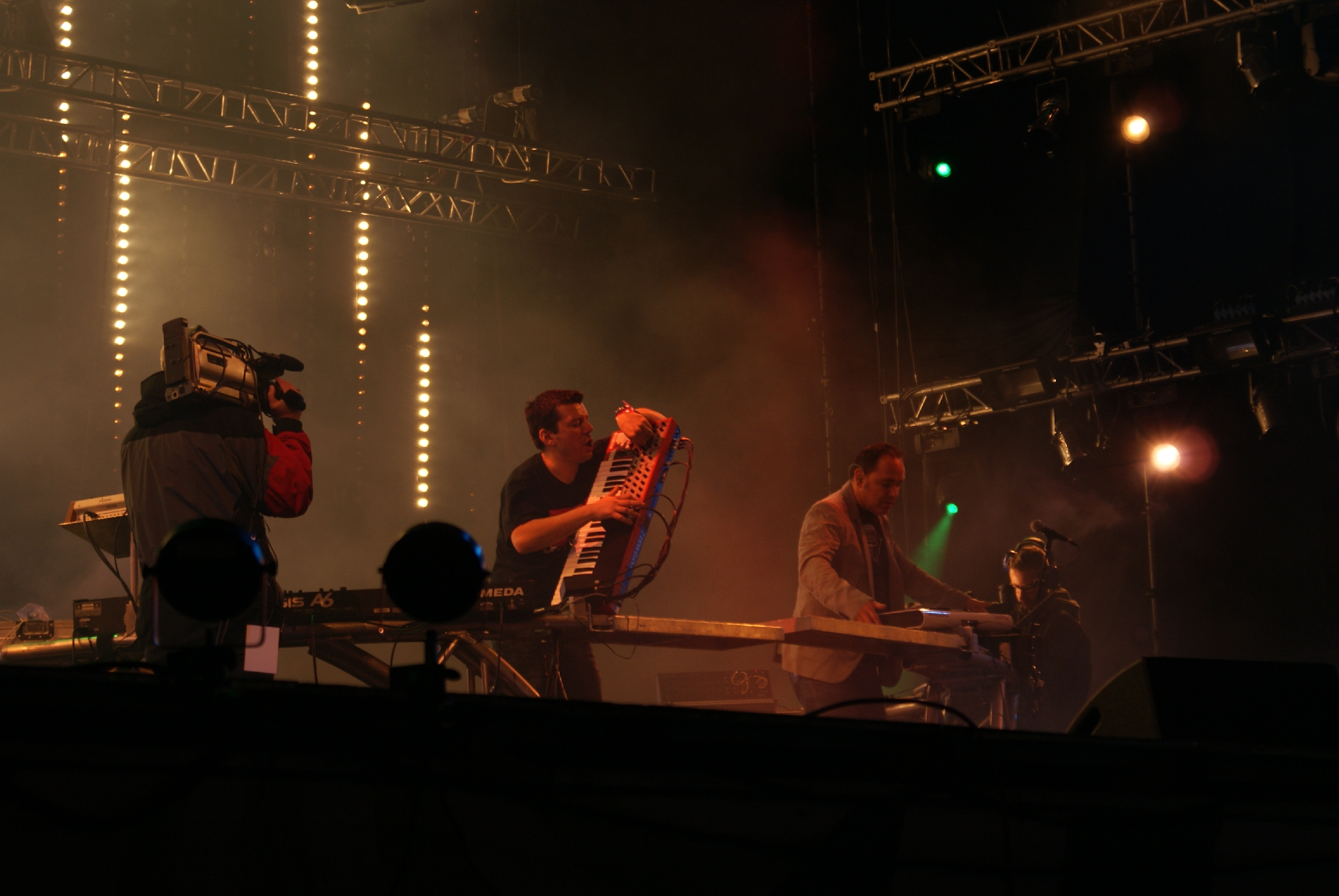
The Crystal Method performing in 2009

The group composed and performed the score for the film London, which was released in February 2006. The soundtrack album included excerpts from the score, two Crystal Method vocal tracks—"Smoked" and "Glass Breaker", which were also released as a single—and songs by artists like Evil Nine, The Out Crowd, and The Perishers.

Shortly after the release of the London soundtrack, The Crystal Method was approached by Nike to take part in a series of music releases specifically designed to be listened to while running. The group's contribution, Drive: Nike + Original Run—the first in the series—was initially released digitally, in June 2006, with the physical release following a year later. Drive peaked at number 23 on the Top Electronic Albums chart. The album, a 45-minute continuous mix, starts off slow, increases in tempo, and slows at the end, following the arc of a typical distance run. In 2006 the track "Robogirl" released by the duo appeared on Dance Dance Revolution: SuperNOVA.

In 2007, ten years after its original release, the group's debut album, Vegas was certified platinum by the RIAA. One month later, a special edition of the album was released, with a second disc including remixes and video.

In late 2008, the group remixed their song "Now Is the Time". Where the original version featured samples of Jesse Jackson, this "Vote '08 Remix" used samples of Barack Obama, marking the presidential election.

=== Divided by Night (2009–2012) ===
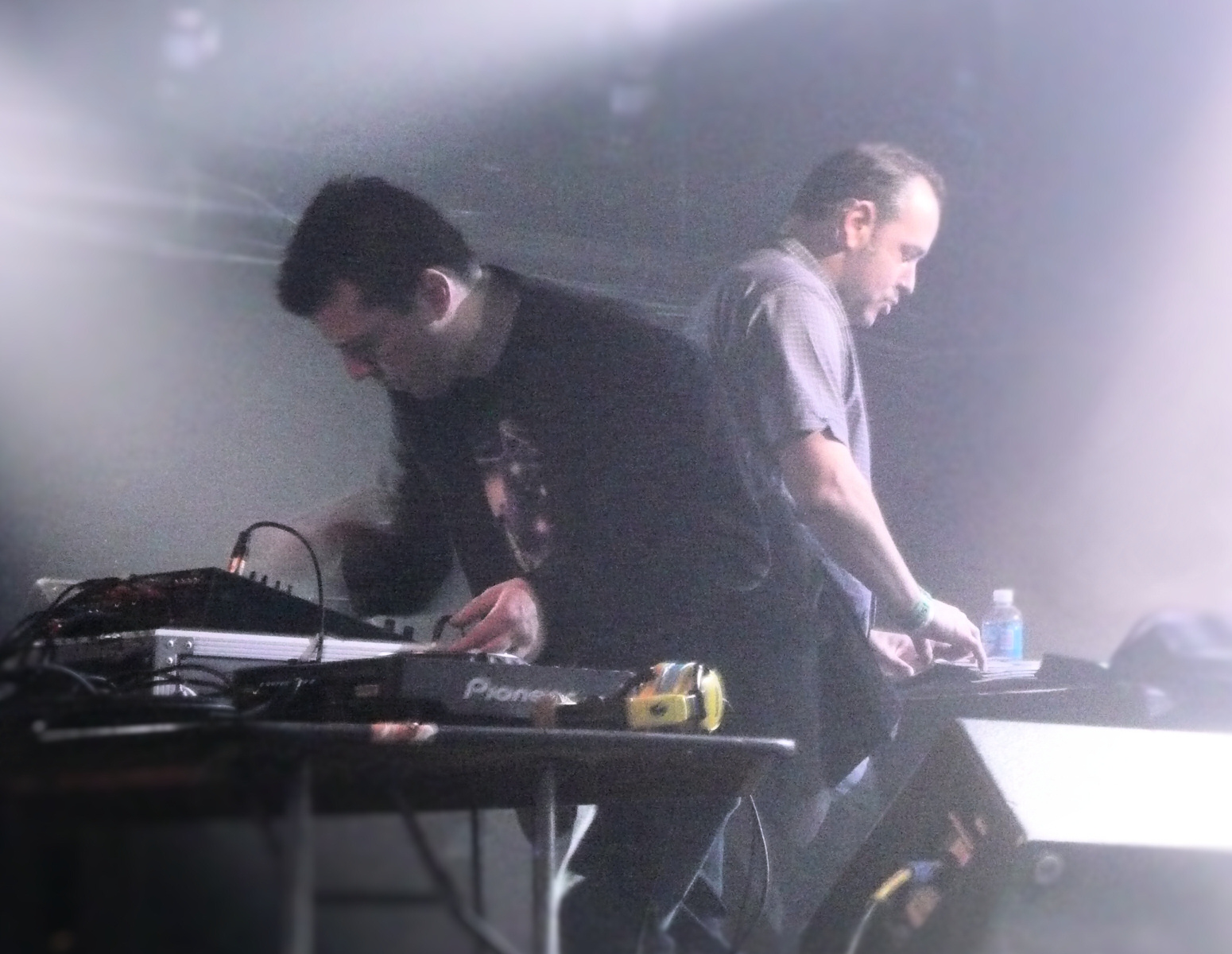
The Crystal Method performing at SXSW 2009

Following the release of Legion of Boom, The Crystal Method began construction of a new, full-sized recording studio in Los Angeles—Crystalwerks. When it was finished, they began work on their fourth studio album, Divided by Night.

On April 14, 2009, The Crystal Method released the digital single "Drown in the Now". A second single, "Black Rainbows", was released via Beatport two weeks later.

The Divided by Night tour started in Boston on May 6, and the album was released the following week. It peaked at number 38 on the Billboard 200, number two on the Top Electronic Albums chart, and number four on the Top Independent Albums chart, and also granted the duo another Grammy nomination. The album features guest artists including LMFAO, Peter Hook (of New Order), Matisyahu, Meiko, Justin Warfield, Emily Haines (of Metric), and Jason Lytle.

X Games 3D: The Movie, released in August 2009, included a number of Crystal Method songs and remixes, including "Drown in the Now" and "Now Is the Time".

=== The Crystal Method and Ken Jordan's departure (2013–2017) ===
Originally scheduled for a June, 2013, release, their eponymous fifth studio album The Crystal Method was delayed by a surgery to remove a cyst in Scott Kirkland's brain. The album was released on January 14, 2014.

When approximately halfway creating the next album process, Scott Kirkland received news that he had developed "what's called a benign posterior fossa arachnoid cyst that needed to be removed from my head." He explains, "It's a simple procedure as far as brain surgery goes, but they still had to cut into my skull and noodle around in there. The surgery wasn't as bad as the infection afterwards, which landed me in the ICU for ten days. Thankfully, I made it out okay. In hindsight, as weird as it sounds, I think we were able to make a better record because we came through this." Following his 2013 recovery, Scott regrouped with Ken Jordan and continued working on the album.

In late 2013, the duo were asked to compose the score and opening theme of Almost Human, a science fiction crime drama airing on Fox. The same year, two of the Crystal Method's songs, "Play for Real" and "Over It", were featured in the 2013 racing game Asphalt 8: Airborne.

In 2014, TCM's song "Single Barrel (Sling the Decks)" was featured in the film Lucy.

In early 2017, Ken Jordan decided to retire from music, and left The Crystal Method; however, Scott Kirkland continues to produce and play shows under the moniker as a solo project.

In 2017, Scott as The Crystal Method went on tour with Tool, and collaborated with Tool bass player Justin Chancellor on a side project called Bandwidth.

=== The Trip Home (2018) ===
On July 17, 2018, Scott Kirkland announced the next Crystal Method album was titled The Trip Home and would be released on September 28, 2018. Kirkland also announced the first single, "Holy Arp", would be released on July 27, 2018.

On July 20, 2018, Kirkland announced a North American tour to support the new album.

On September 7, 2018, Kirkland announced the second single "There's a Difference" featuring Franky Perez, which released the same day.

On November 26, 2018, Kirkland and Jean-Michel Jarre announced that they would be collaborating on a track on Jean-Michel Jarre's next electronica album.

=== The Trip Out (2022) ===
On February 18, 2022, The Crystal Method announced a follow-up album to The Trip Home titled The Trip Out while simultaneously releasing their first single "Post Punk" featuring DJ Hyper and Iggy Pop.

The second single "Watch Me Now" featuring Koda & VAAAL debuted April 11, live on NBC's American Song Contest, and would later go on to be featured in the soundtrack for MLB The Show 23. The album was released on Ultra Records on April 15, 2022.

== Discography ==
Studio albums

- Vegas (1997)
- Tweekend (2001)
- Legion of Boom (2004)
- Divided by Night (2009)
- The Crystal Method (2014)
- The Trip Home (2018)
- The Trip Out (2022)
