= Community Service II =

Compilation album by The Crystal Method
- Released: April 5, 2005
- Genre: Electronica, big beat, nu skool breaks
- Length: 76:39
- Label: Ultra Records

The Crystal Method chronology
Legion of Boom (2004)	Community Service II (2005)	London Movie Soundtrack (2006)

Professional ratings
Review scores
Source	Rating
Allmusic	3/5 stars

Community Service II is the second collaboration album from The Crystal Method, and features remixes from The Crystal Method and other Nu skool breaks artists.

== Track listing ==
1. The Crystal Method - Intro – 1:38
2. PMT - Gyromancer (Elite Force Mix) – 4:14
3. Elite Force - Ghetto Fabulous – 5:30
4. Hyper - Come With Me – 5:02
5. The Doors - Roadhouse Blues (The Crystal Method vs. The Doors) – 4:57
6. Evil Nine - We Have The Energy – 5:00
7. Dylan Rhymes feat. Katherine Ellis - Salty (Meat Katie Mix) – 5:36
8. The Crystal Method - Keep Hope Alive (J.D.S Mix) – 5:44
9. Koma + Bones - Speedfreak – 2:39
10. The Crystal Method feat. Kevin Beber - Kalifornia – 4:25
11. Überzone - Octopus – 2:42
12. UNKLE feat. Ian Brown - Reign (False Prophet Mix) – 6:38
13. The Crystal Method - Starting Over (Elite Force Mix) – 4:40
14. The Crystal Method - Bound Too Long (Hyper Mix) – 5:24
15. New Order - Bizarre Love Triangle (The Crystal Method's CSII Mix) – 5:32
16. Smashing Pumpkins - 1979 (New Originals 1799 Remix) – 6:57

== CSII Exclusives EP ==
At approximately the same time as the release of the album, the CSII Exclusives EP was released in a digital-only format, exclusively on the iTunes Store. The EP contained an additional track, "Bad Ass", as well as the full-length, unmixed versions of tracks 8, 10, 13, and 14.

=== Track listing ===
1. "Badass" – 5:23
2. "Bound Too Long (Hyper Mix)" – 7:07
3. "Kalifornia" – 5:39
4. "Keep Hope Alive (JDS Mix)" – 7:46
5. "Starting Over (Elite Force Mix)" – 8:05

== Personnel ==
- Chris Allen – Mixing
- Tom Beaufoy – Producer
- Marvin Beaver – Producer, Remixing
- Kevin Beber – Producer, Mixing
- Richard Bishop – Management
- SuzAnn Brantner – Management
- Ian Brown – Vocals
- Will Brunner – Producer, Remixing
- Luke Bullen – Drums
- The Crystal Method – Producer, Remixing, Mastering, Mixing
- Elite Force – Producer, Remixing
- Mike Eller – Artwork
- Katy Ellis – Producer
- Richard File – Synthesizer, Programming
- Richard Flack – Synthesizer, Programming
- Antony Genn – Piano, Keyboards
- Ginny Hatfield – Producer
- Hyper – Producer, Remixing
- Ken Jordan – Producer, Mixing, Group Member
- Scott Kirkland – Producer, Mixing, Group Member
- Maura Lanahan – Photography
- The London Session Orchestra
- Will Malone – Conductor, String Arrangements
- Mani – Bass
- Julian Napolitano – Producer, Remixing
- Chris Olmos – Production Assistant
- P. Pardy – Producer
- Darren Pearce – Producer, Remixing
- Mark Pember – Producer, Remixing
- Psycho Pab – Synthesizer, Programming
- Rahzel – Vocals
- Ronnie – Producer, Remixing
- J.A. Ross – Producer
- Jude "Proteus" Sabastian – Engineer
- Damian Taylor – Synthesizer, Programming
- Hanifah Walidah – Vocals
- Gavyn Wright – Orchestra Leader
