= El Comegente =

Song by Soulfly

from the album Savages
- Released: September 30, 2013
- Recorded: 2013
- Genre: Groove metal, death metal
- Length: 8:17
- Label: Nuclear Blast
- Songwriter(s): Max Cavalera, Tony Campos
- Producer(s): Terry Date

"El Comegente" is a song recorded by American metal band Soulfly for their ninth album Savages. The song plays a slow, death-laden grooves, followed by Led Zeppelin-like acoustic bass solo performed by Tony Campos beginning about five minutes into the song. Guitarist Marc Rizzo calls this solo "Mars Part Two."

Campos was the first to suggest the song about the serial killer and cannibal Dorángel Vargas, titling after Vargas' nickname El comegente (Spanish for "people eater"). He helped Max Cavalera write lyrics and sing together — Campos screams in Spanish while Cavalera growls in Portuguese.
