= The Water Cure (disambiguation) =

"The Water Cure" is a 1916 American silent comedy film featuring Oliver Hardy.

The Water Cure may also refer to:

== Books ==
- The Water Cure, a 2007 novel by Percival Everett
- The Water Cure, a 2018 novel by Sophie Mackintosh
- The Water Cure in Chronic Disease, a 1846 book by James Manby Gully

== Other uses ==
- The Water-Cure, a 1991 play by Carey Harrison
- The Water-Cure Journal, a journal created by Joel Shew
- "The Water Cure", a song by Systematic from their 2003 album Pleasure to Burn

== See also ==
- Water cure (disambiguation)
