= Archangel (Soulfly album) =

2015 studio album by Soulfly

Studio album by Soulfly
- Released: August 14, 2015
- Recorded: 2015
- Studios: Megawatt Recording Studios; (Los Angeles, California)
- Genres: Thrash metal; groove metal; death metal
- Length: 36:38 (regular edition); 45:16 (special edition)
- Label: Nuclear Blast
- Producer: Matt Hyde

Soulfly chronology
Savages (2013)	Archangel (2015)	Ritual (2018)

Singles from Archangel
- 1. "We Sold Our Souls to Metal" Released: July 3, 2015; 2. "Sodomites" Released: July 30, 2015; 3. "Archangel" Released: August 10, 2015; 4. "Titans" Released: January 14, 2016

Archangel is the tenth studio album by American heavy metal band Soulfly. It was released on August 14, 2015, through Nuclear Blast. It is the band's second shortest album to date, running thirty-six and a half minutes. It is the band's last album to feature bassist Tony Campos, who left the band shortly after recording to join Fear Factory. With a peak position of number 130 on the Billboard 200, it is Soulfly's second-lowest charting album to date (behind 2005's Dark Ages, which peaked at number 155).

== Track listing ==
All tracks are written by Max Cavalera except where stated.

Archangel
No.	Title	Lyrics	Length
1.	"We Sold Our Souls to Metal"		3:00
2.	"Archangel"		4:47
3.	"Sodomites"		3:55
4.	"Ishtar Rising"		2:45
5.	"Live Life Hard!"		3:56
6.	"Shamash"		3:48
7.	"Bethlehem's Blood"		4:18
8.	"Titans"		4:44
9.	"Deceiver"		2:44
10.	"Mother of Dragons"	Richie Cavalera; Igor Cavalera Jr.; M. Cavalera	2:41
Total length:			36:38

Special edition bonus tracks
No.	Title	Lyrics	Music	Length
11.	"You Suffer" (Napalm Death cover)	Nicholas Bullen	Nicholas Bullen	0:10
12.	"Acosador Nocturno"	Tony Campos; M. Cavalera		2:45
13.	"Soulfly X" (instrumental)			5:42
Total length:				45:16

Bonus DVD: "Live at Hellfest 2014" (special edition only)
No.	Title	Length
1.	"Cannibal Holocaust"
2.	"Refuse/Resist"
3.	"Bloodshed"
4.	"Back to the Primitive"
5.	"Seek 'N' Strike"
6.	"Tribe"
7.	"Rise of the Fallen"
8.	"Revengeance"
9.	"Roots Bloody Roots"
10.	"Jumpdafuckup / Eye for an Eye"

== Reception ==
Professional ratings
Review scores
Source	Rating
About.com	4/5 stars
Angry Metal Guy	2.5/5
Blabbermouth.net	8/10
Metal Hammer	4/5 stars
Metal Injection	7.5/10
MetalSucks	3/5 stars
RockSins	7.5/10

Andrew "Schizodeluxe" Massie of The Rockpit reviewed that the album is "a somewhat diverse record with the death metal inspired tracks, the groove mid-tempo stuff and the thrashier songs mixed in there. Archangel is both streamlined and very aggressive". Riley Rowe of Metal Injection wrote that "Archangel, an apt title to indicate Soulfly's spreading of wings towards a more mature style, is the grand and fitting next step in their mystical, musical journey". Ray Van Horn Jr. of Blabbermouth reviewed that "Archangel is the most daring and freshest Soulfly album since Prophecy, but there's something slightly remiss and somewhat disjointed in this leaner yet embroidered shift toward yet another new order in this band". Elpida Baphomet of Metal Invader reviewed that "Archangel is characterized by its sophisticated oriental compositions, powerful grooves, multifaceted choirs and religious orientations. All of the instruments and voices stand out in the best possible way". Steve of Metal Blast! reviewed that the album starts out with a bang showcasing expert performances and then the entertainment fizzles out in the album's second half.

== Personnel ==
Soulfly

- Max Cavalera – vocals, 4-string guitar, sitar on "Soulfly X"
- Marc Rizzo – lead guitar, flamenco guitar on "Soulfly X"
- Tony Campos – bass, vocals on "Acosador Nocturno", acoustic bass on "Soulfly X"
- Zyon Cavalera – drums, percussion

Additional musicians

- Todd Jones – vocals on "Sodomites"
- Matt Young – vocals on "Live Life Hard!"
- Richie Cavalera – vocals on "Mother of Dragons"
- Igor Cavalera Jr – vocals and bass on "Mother of Dragons"
- Anahid M.O.P. – vocals on "Mother of Dragons"
- Roki Cavalera – intro on "You Suffer"
- Roman Babakhanyan – duduk on "Soulfly X"

Production

- Matt Hyde – production, recording, mixing, mastering, interludes
- Chris Rakestraw – engineering
- Rem Massingill – assistant
- Allen Steelgrave – assistant
- Jon Nicholson – drum tech
- Samuel Petit – direction (DVD), editing (DVD)
- Fred Ricci – editing (DVD)
- Benoit Gilg – audio mixing (DVD)
- Patrick Villeneuve – production (DVD)
- Eric Hallier – production (DVD)
- Sombrero & Co – production (DVD)

Artwork

- Eliran Kantor – album cover art
- Leo Zulueta – logo
- Hannah Verbeuren – photography
- Marcelo Vasco – design
- Maicon Ristow – illustration

== Charts ==
Chart (2015)	Peak position
Australian Albums (ARIA)	41
Austrian Albums (Ö3 Austria)	31
Czech Albums (ČNS IFPI)	17
Belgian Albums (Ultratop Flanders)	28
Belgian Albums (Ultratop Wallonia)	21
Dutch Albums (Album Top 100)	33
Finnish Albums (Suomen virallinen lista)	22
French Albums (SNEP)	66
German Albums (Offizielle Top 100)	19
Scottish Albums (Official Charts)	45
Swiss Albums (Schweizer Hitparade)	11
UK Albums (Official Charts)	57
UK Independent Albums (Official Charts)	5
UK Rock & Metal Albums (Official Charts)	6
US Billboard 200	130
