= World Scum =

Single by Soulfly featuring Travis Ryan

from the album Enslaved
- Released: January 25, 2012
- Recorded: September 2011
- Genre: Death metal; thrash metal
- Length: 5:20
- Label: Roadrunner
- Songwriters: Max Cavalera; Travis Ryan
- Producers: Max Cavalera; Chris Harris

Soulfly singles chronology
"Rise of the Fallen" (2010)	"World Scum" (2012)	"Bloodshed" (2013)

Music video
- "World Scum" on YouTube

"World Scum" is a song by American heavy metal band Soulfly, released as the first and only single from the 2012 album Enslaved. The song was recorded in September 2011 at Tallcat Studios in Phoenix, Arizona, and released in late January 2012. It was released in the game Sleeping Dogs and written and produced by Max Cavalera, co-written by Cattle Decapitation's Travis Ryan, serving as guest vocals, and co-produced by Chris Harris. The music video for this song was released three weeks later than the single.

== Composition and lyrics ==
This 5:20 song has sequence of Morbid Angel, Earth Crisis and Strife styles in tremolos.

Lyrically, "World Scum" is about a variety of disasters making up doomsday, including wars, torture, plague and famine. In addition to imaginations, lines include real-life disasters, including JFK assassination and bombings of Hiroshima and Nagasaki. The song title is sung six times, matching with 'blood scum'.

== Music video ==
A man dreams about hunting down frogs and dissecting it while serving time in prison. His dream begins when another man sorts pills into separate petri dishes and starts dissecting a frog to analyze its interior, while he hunts down frogs through the window using the sniper rifle. Then he goes out to bring more frogs in for dissection but he gets attacked by a slaver armed with an ax, dismembering his lower right leg. Snakes would start eating tissues where his leg was cut as a flock of sheep roam by. Then the man in lab apron went to check on him and found that he's brutally beaten, and confronted the ax man about the attack. The attacker swings an ax onto him one more time to make him perish. And then like the first scene of this music video, the final scene shows the same man sitting in the cell after his nightmarish dream is over. The video also shows what appears to be Jesus Christ being tempted by Satan.

== Personnel ==
Band members

- Max Cavalera – vocals, rhythm guitar
- Marc Rizzo – lead guitar
- Tony Campos – bass
- David Kinkade – drums, percussion

Guest/Session

- Travis Ryan – vocals

Miscellaneous staff

- Max Cavalera – production, writing
- Chris Harris – co-producer, engineering, mixing, mastering
- Marcelo Vasco – cover art
- Travis Ryan – co-writing
