= Savages (Soulfly album) =

- Savages album cover art by Paul Stottler

Studio album by Soulfly
- Released: September 30, 2013 (UK); October 1, 2013 (US); October 4, 2013 (EU); December 13, 2013 (Brazil)
- Recorded: May–June 2013
- Studios: Studio X (Seattle, Washington)
- Genres: Thrash metal; groove metal; death metal
- Length: 58:10 (regular edition); 69:30 (special edition)
- Label: Nuclear Blast
- Producer: Terry Date

Soulfly chronology
Enslaved (2012)	Savages (2013)	Archangel (2015)

Singles from Savages
- 1. "Bloodshed" Released: August 8, 2013; 2. "Master of Savagery" Released: September 9, 2013; 3. "Ayatollah of Rock 'n' Rolla" Released: 2014

Savages is the ninth studio album by American heavy metal band Soulfly, released on September 30, 2013. The album is the first to feature drummer Zyon Cavalera, frontman Max's son, in a full-time capacity after the departure of David Kinkade in 2012. The first single from the album, "Bloodshed" featuring Max's other son (and Zyon's brother) Igor, debuted on the BBC Radio 1 Rock Show on August 6, 2013.

The album was produced by Terry Date, who had previously performed mixing work for Soulfly on 3, Prophecy and Dark Ages. The album features a number of guest vocalists including Lody Kong's Igor Cavalera Jr., I Declare War's Jamie Hanks, Clutch's Neil Fallon and Napalm Death's Mitch Harris.

Savages marks the group's first record to be released on Nuclear Blast Records. It was released in CD (digipak edition with two bonus tracks, and standard jewel case), limited edition vinyl, and digital download formats.

The album debuted at No. 84 on the Billboard 200, selling 4,700 copies during the first week after the release.

== Songs ==
"Bloodshed" is the first of three singles released from the album. This song plays in mid-tempo and contains little tribal influences. "El Comegente" features Portuguese and Spanish lyrics about the 1980s Venezuelan serial killer and cannibal Dorángel Vargas, who is an "El Comegente", Spanish for people eater. Tony Campos is featured as vocalist while playing bass. The closing section has Led Zeppelin-like acoustic bass solo and Marc Rizzo calls this part "Mars Part Two".

"Master of Savagery" is the quasi-title track and the second single of the album containing grooves similar to earlier Soulfly albums followed by bass solo. The album's third single, "Ayatollah of Rock 'n' Rolla", has Pantera-like grooves with clean vocals by Neil Fallon. "Fallen" begins with an acoustic guitar, then thrashy riffs, followed by monster-like growls by guest Jamie Hanks of I Declare War. "Cannibal Holocaust" is a speedy song speaking about destruction of humanity due to cannibalism.

== Track listing ==
All tracks are written by Max Cavalera except where stated.

Savages CD track listing
No.	Title	Lyrics	Length
1.	"Bloodshed" (featuring Igor Cavalera Jr.)		6:55
2.	"Cannibal Holocaust"		3:29
3.	"Fallen" (featuring Jamie Hanks)		5:55
4.	"Ayatollah of Rock 'n' Rolla" (featuring Neil Fallon)	Max Cavalera; Neil Fallon	7:29
5.	"Master of Savagery"		5:10
6.	"Spiral"		5:34
7.	"This Is Violence"		4:23
8.	"K.C.S." (Kill, Cut, Scalp) (featuring Mitch Harris)		5:15
9.	"El Comegente"	Max Cavalera; Tony Campos	8:17
10.	"Soulfliktion"		5:43
Total length:			58:10

Digipak bonus tracks
No.	Title	Length
11.	"Fuck Reality"	5:25
12.	"Soulfly IX" (instrumental)	5:55
Total length:		69:30

== Reception ==
Professional ratings
Aggregate scores
Source	Rating
Metacritic	64/100
Review scores
Source	Rating
About.com	3.5/5 stars
AllMusic	4/5 stars
Blabbermouth.net	8/10 stars
Classic Rock Magazine	7/10 stars
Exclaim!	6/10
Kerrang!	2/5 stars
Metal Injection	7/10
musicOMH	6/10 stars
Record Collector	8/10 stars
Revolver	3/5 stars

According to the review aggregator Metacritic, Savages received "generally favorable reviews" based on a weighted average score of 64 out of 100 from 7 critic scores. Matt Hinch of About.com said that "For the most part, Savages is fairly typical Soulfly. It's a mix of the new and old without flip-flopping song to song, yet still way more aggressive and thrashy than their first three albums." James Christopher Conger of AllMusic described that this album continues the Soulfly tradition, "meant to be taken as both a warning and a rebel yell, offering up an audio invoice for our past transgressions and a shot of adrenaline for the war ahead." Record Collector praised this album as very good, "Savages is a feisty record that returns to the familiar blend of hardcore, thrash and groove metal." One review had a negative response. According to Kerrang! this album has "too many songs utilise the same plodding, mid-paced grooves and simple, one-line refrains."

According to Blabbermouth.net, Max Cavalera stated that this album is "about the human condition right now. We have the Internet and we're working on missions to Mars, but we are still decapitating each other and blowing up marathons. We're still savages. Even with technology and how far we've come in the world, our spirit is still that of a savage". This publisher reviewed that this album's riffing connects well with Soulfly. Another critic from musicOMH had a mixed response, but this album signals an end of bad situations.

== Personnel ==
Soulfly

- Max Cavalera – vocals, four-string guitar, sitar
- Marc Rizzo – lead guitar, flamenco guitar, sitar
- Tony Campos – bass, acoustic bass guitar, vocals on "El Comegente"
- Zyon Cavalera – drums, percussion

Additional musician

- Neil Fallon – additional vocals on "Ayatollah of Rock 'n' Rolla"
- Mitch Harris – additional vocals on "K.C.S."
- Jamie Hanks – additional vocals on "Fallen"
- Igor Cavalera Jr. – additional vocals on "Bloodshed"

Production

- Terry Date – production, engineering, mixing
- Sam Hofstedt – additional engineering
- Ted Jensen – mastering
- Monte Conner – A&R

Management

- Gloria Cavalera – management
- Christina Stajanovic – assistant
- Bryan Roberts – assistant

Artwork

- Paul Stottler – album cover art, design
- Ted Venemann – layout, design, photography
- Leo Zulueta – Soulfly logo

== Charts ==
Chart (2013)	Peak position
Austrian Albums (Ö3 Austria)	43
Belgian Albums (Ultratop Flanders)	83
Belgian Albums (Ultratop Wallonia)	86
Finnish Albums (Suomen virallinen lista)	39
French Albums (SNEP)	91
German Albums (Offizielle Top 100)	41
Hungarian Albums (MAHASZ)	37
Swiss Albums (Schweizer Hitparade)	48
US Billboard 200	84
