= Ayatollah of Rock 'n' Rolla =

Single by Soulfly featuring Neil Fallon

from the album Savages
- Released: 2014
- Recorded: late spring 2013
- Genre: Groove metal; thrash metal
- Length: 7:29 (full); 5:04 (edit)
- Label: Nuclear Blast
- Songwriter(s): Max Cavalera
- Producer(s): Terry Date

Soulfly singles chronology
"Master of Savagery" (2013)	"Ayatollah of Rock 'n' Rolla" (2014)	"We Sold Our Souls to Metal" (2015)

Ayatollah of Rock 'n' Rolla is a 2014 single released by Soulfly. The song was first released on the album Savages in 2013. The song's title was inspired by a quote from the film Mad Max 2.

The song features Neil Fallon of Clutch, providing clean vocals in addition to roars by Max Cavalera. The song contains elements of Southern metal in the Pantera style.

Fallon has thoughts about himself and Cavalera singing together, "I am stoked to have been asked by Max to participate on the 'Ayatollah of Rock 'N' Rolla' track! Max brought Clutch out on some of our earliest and most formative tours and this brought back some very fond memories of singing with Max all those years ago." Cavalera quoted about his likeness to Ghost Cult magazine, "A song like 'Ayatollah of Rock 'N' Rolla,' it was something totally new. I never did anything like that before. It starts with like this country, cowboy riff, and Neil starts talking over it and it was so killer! And of course that line in the chorus 'Ayatollah of Rock 'N' Rolla' is from Mad Max. It's probably my favorite song on the album. I don't want to make the same record over and over." Cavalera commented to Songfacts about why he wanted Neil Fallon to join him, "I thought it was a great idea to do a song with Clutch, and mixing Soulfly and Clutch together in the same song for me sounded just so amazing and unusual and wild and exotic, which was great. We did it and it sounds killer."

== Personnel ==
Band members

- Max Cavalera – vocals, rhythm guitar
- Marc Rizzo – lead guitar
- Tony Campos – bass
- Zyon Cavalera – drums, percussion

Guest

- Neil Fallon – co-vocals

Other staff

- Terry Date – production, engineering, mixing
- Sam Hofstedt – assistant engineering
- Ted Jensen – mastering
- Max Cavalera – writing
