= Pandemonium (Cavalera Conspiracy album) =

Studio album by Cavalera Conspiracy
- Released: October 31, 2014
- Length: 51:06
- Label: Napalm
- Producer: Max Cavalera

Cavalera Conspiracy chronology
Blunt Force Trauma (2011)	Pandemonium (2014)	Psychosis (2017)

Singles from Pandemonium
- 1. "Bonzai Kamakazi" Released: September 30, 2014; 2. "Babylonian Pandemonium" Released: October 14, 2014; 3. "Not Losing the Edge" Released: October 27, 2014

Pandemonium is the third studio album by Cavalera Conspiracy. The album was released October 31 in Europe, November 3 in the UK, and November 4, 2014, in North America.

== Album information ==
During the writing of the album Max Cavalera almost considered naming the album "Fuck That Groove" because of how fast and brutal the songs ended up. In an interview with Loudwire, Max admitted to putting his brother Igor to the test, “It’s like trying to make him play fast like he’s 15-years-old … You’re gonna play fast the whole time and every time he was in a groove, I’d say, ‘Fuck the groove, get out of the groove and go back to fast.”

A new song titled "Bonzai Kamikaze" was uploaded to Napalm's official SoundCloud in August. The song is about Japanese kamikaze pilots and their fervor to commit suicide for their country.

== Track listing ==
All tracks are written by Max Cavalera.

No.	Title	Length
1.	"Babylonian Pandemonium"	3:35
2.	"Bonzai Kamikazee"	4:04
3.	"Scum"	2:28
4.	"I, Barbarian"	3:24
5.	"Cramunhão"	5:28
6.	"Apex Predator"	3:45
7.	"Insurrection"	3:49
8.	"Not Losing the Edge"	5:10
9.	"Father of Hate"	3:31
10.	"The Crucible"	3:27

Digipack
No.	Title	Length
11.	"Deus Ex Machina" (bonus track)	6:29
12.	"Porra" (bonus track)	5:59

== Personnel ==
Cavalera Conspiracy

- Max Cavalera – vocals, rhythm guitar
- Igor Cavalera – drums, percussion
- Marc Rizzo – lead guitar
- Nate Newton – bass, co-lead vocals on "The Crucible"

Production

- Max Cavalera – production
- John W. Gray – recording, mixing
- Matt Turner – assistant engineering
- Joe Laporta – mastering

== Charts ==
Chart (2014)	Peak position
French Albums Chart	182
German Albums Chart	88
Japan Albums Chart (Oricon)	188
Swiss Albums Chart	78
US Billboard 200	178

The album has sold over 2,600 copies in the United States.
