= Psychosis (album) =

2017 album by Cavalera Conspiracy

Studio album by Cavalera Conspiracy
- Released: November 17, 2017
- Studio: The Platinum Underground Studios, Phoenix, AZ
- Genre: Thrash metal, death metal, groove metal
- Length: 41:07
- Label: Napalm
- Producer: Arthur Rizk

Cavalera Conspiracy chronology
Pandemonium (2014)	Psychosis (2017)	Morbid Visions (2023)

Singles from Psychosis
- 1. "Insane" Released: September 29, 2017; 2. "Spectral War" Released: October 27, 2017

Professional ratings
Review scores
Source	Rating
Blabbermouth.net	9/10
Loudwire	Favorable
metalfans.be	9.5/5 stars
Metal Injection	9.5/10
MetalSucks	4/5 stars

Psychosis is the fourth studio album by American heavy metal band Cavalera Conspiracy. It was released on November 17, 2017, through Napalm Records. It is their last record with guitarist Marc Rizzo. "Insane" and "Spectral War" were released as singles. The album was produced by Arthur Rizk, who performed bass and synth on the record. None of the album's tracks have been played live.

== Track listing ==
All songs written by Max Cavalera, Igor Cavalera and Marc Rizzo.

No.	Title	Length
1.	"Insane"	3:50
2.	"Terror Tactics"	4:57
3.	"Impalement Execution"	4:25
4.	"Spectral War"	5:03
5.	"Crom"	5:29
6.	"Hellfire" (featuring Justin Broadrick of Godflesh)	3:10
7.	"Judas Pariah"	3:52
8.	"Psychosis" (Instrumental)	3:59
9.	"Excruciating" (featuring Jose Mangin)	6:22
Total length:		41:07

Deluxe edition bonus DVD
No.	Title	Length
1.	"Conspiracy Diaries Documentary"	35:32
Total length:		35:32

== Personnel ==
Cavalera Conspiracy

- Max Cavalera – vocals, rhythm guitar
- Igor Cavalera – drums, percussion
- Marc Rizzo – lead guitar

Production

- Arthur Rizk – production, mixing, engineering, bass, noise, synthesizer
- Joel Grind – mastering
- John Aquilino – engineering
- Peter Sallai – artwork
- Leonardo da Vinci – illustrations
- Branca Studio – layout

Other musicians

- Justin Broadrick – vocals on "Hellfire"
- Jason Tarpey – vocals on "Crom"
- Roki Abdelaziz – vocals on "Crom"
- Jose Mangin – spoken word on "Excruciating"
- Dominick Fernow – synthesizer on "Spectral War", "Hellfire" and "Excruciating"
- Mixhell (Iggor Cavalera and Laima Leyton) – intro on "Psychosis"
- Christian Cavalera – hurdy-gurdy on "Judas Pariah"
- Aaron Jaws Homoki – jaw-harp on "Excruciating"
- Roy Young – didgeridoo on "Excruciating"

== Charts ==
Chart (2017)	Peak position
Belgian Albums (Ultratop Flanders)	74
Belgian Albums (Ultratop Wallonia)	119
German Albums (Offizielle Top 100)	78
