= Blunt Force Trauma (album) =

Studio album by Cavalera Conspiracy
- Released: March 29, 2011
- Recorded: January–May 2010 at The Liar, Los Angeles, California
- Length: 34:05
- Label: Roadrunner
- Producers: Max Cavalera, Logan Mader

Cavalera Conspiracy chronology
Inflikted (2008)	Blunt Force Trauma (2011)	Pandemonium (2014)

Singles from Blunt Force Trauma
- 1. "Killing Inside" Released: February 20, 2011; 2. "Warlord" Released: July 11, 2011

Professional ratings
Review scores
Source	Rating
Thrash Hits	3.5/6
Allmusic	3.5/5 stars
Sputnikmusic	3.0/5
Rockfreaks.net	7/10 stars

Blunt Force Trauma is the second studio album by American Brazilian metal band Cavalera Conspiracy. The album was released on March 29, 2011 through Roadrunner Records.

== Album information ==
Max Cavalera has this to say about the second Cavalera Conspiracy album on blabbermouth.net:

"Yeah, (we) just got done (in May), so I just got back from the studio. It's finished. We recorded 15 songs, 13 being originals for the album, and then we did a Black Sabbath cover, 'Electric Funeral', that's gonna come out on a Metal Hammer compilation in Europe. And we did a Black Flag cover, a song called 'Six Pack'. We also had a collaboration with Roger from Agnostic Front — he sings on a song called 'Lynch Mob' that we did together in the studio in L.A.; he flew to L.A. to do this collaboration. I was really proud because, to me, Roger is like the godfather of New York hardcore; Agnostic Front is one of the pioneer bands of the whole New York hardcore scene, so it was like recording with a legend of hardcore. The Cavalera album is really intense; that's all I can say about it. It makes the first album sound like pop music."

Regarding the songwriting and recording process for the new Cavalera Conspiracy album, Max said,

"I wrote a lot of the stuff and I sent it to Brazil to (Igor) in the form of a CD — like four tracks of the riffs — so that he would be familiarized with the songs by the time I got to the studio. And then I brought another CD with me, which was, like, newer songs I had just got done (writing) for the album. And everything else we did in the studio together — me and him there on the spot. I told him the idea of making a very intense album with some songs being only a minute and a half, so it's a cross (between) Minor Threat and Slayer and Cavalera Conspiracy. So the idea was really cool — Igor really liked that — and from that point on, the album just grew and song after song, every day a new song came in. And I'm really happy with it. I think people are gonna be blown away when they hear it. I think it's a pretty cool album."

== Track listing ==
All tracks are written by Max Cavalera, except where noted.

No.	Title	Length
1.	"Warlord"	3:05
2.	"Torture"	1:51
3.	"Lynch Mob" (Featuring Roger Miret of Agnostic Front) (Cavalera, Miret)	2:31
4.	"Killing Inside"	3:28
5.	"Thrasher"	2:49
6.	"I Speak Hate"	3:10
7.	"Target"	2:36
8.	"Genghis Khan"	4:23
9.	"Burn Waco"	2:52
10.	"Rasputin"	3:22
11.	"Blunt Force Trauma"	3:58
Total length:		34:05

Special edition
No.	Title	Length
12.	"Psychosomatic"	3:09
13.	"Jihad Joe"	3:31
14.	"Electric Funeral" (Black Sabbath cover)	5:41
Total length:		46:26

Limited edition vinyl LP
No.	Title	Length
15.	"Six Pack" (Black Flag cover)	1:51
Total length:		48:17

DVD edition: Live at Les Eurockéennes Festival, Belfort, France - July 5, 2008
No.	Title	Length
1.	"Inflikted"
2.	"Sanctuary"
3.	"Territory" (Sepultura cover)
4.	"Terrorize"
5.	"The Doom of All Fires"
6.	"Inner Self/Nevertrust" (Sepultura cover/original song)
7.	"Arise/Dead Embryonic Cells" (Sepultura cover)
8.	"Desperate Cry/Propaganda" (Sepultura cover)
9.	"Wasting Away" (Nailbomb cover)
10.	"Black Ark" (featuring Richie Cavalera of Incite)
11.	"Holiday in Cambodia/Biotech Is Godzilla" (Dead Kennedys/Sepultura cover)
12.	"Hearts of Darkness"
13.	"Refuse/Resist" (Sepultura cover)
14.	"Troops of Doom" (featuring Igor Cavalera, Jr. on drums) (Sepultura cover)
15.	"Must Kill"
16.	"Roots Bloody Roots" (Sepultura cover)
17.	"Sanctuary" (music video)

== Personnel ==
Cavalera Conspiracy

- Max Cavalera – vocals, rhythm guitar
- Igor Cavalera – drums, percussion
- Marc Rizzo – lead guitar
- Johny Chow – bass

Additional personnel

- Guest vocals on "Lynch Mob" by Roger Miret (from Agnostic Front)
- Produced by Max Cavalera
- Co-produced by Logan Mader for Dirty Icon Productions
- Recorded, mixed and mastered by Logan Mader at Undercity Studios, North Hollywood, California

DVD Credits

- Max Cavalera - vocals, rhythm guitar
- Igor Cavalera - drums, percussion
- Marc Rizzo - lead guitar
- Johny Chow - bass
- Richie Cavalera - guest vocals on "Black Ark"
- Igor Cavalera, Jr. - guest drums on "Troops of Doom"
- Joe Duplantier - bass in "Sanctuary" music video

== Charts ==
Peak chart positions										Sales
JPN	UK	FIN	GER	AUT	SWI	AUS	NLD	FRA	USA	Sales
99	99	35	45	46	59	31	74	92	123	US: 5,000+
"—" denotes a recording that did not chart or was not released in that territory.
