= Water cure =

Water cure may refer to:

- Water cure (therapy), a course of medical treatment by hydrotherapy
- Water cure (torture), a form of torture in which a person is forced to drink large quantities of water

== See also ==
- The Water Cure (disambiguation)
