= Garage (band) =

Czech rock band

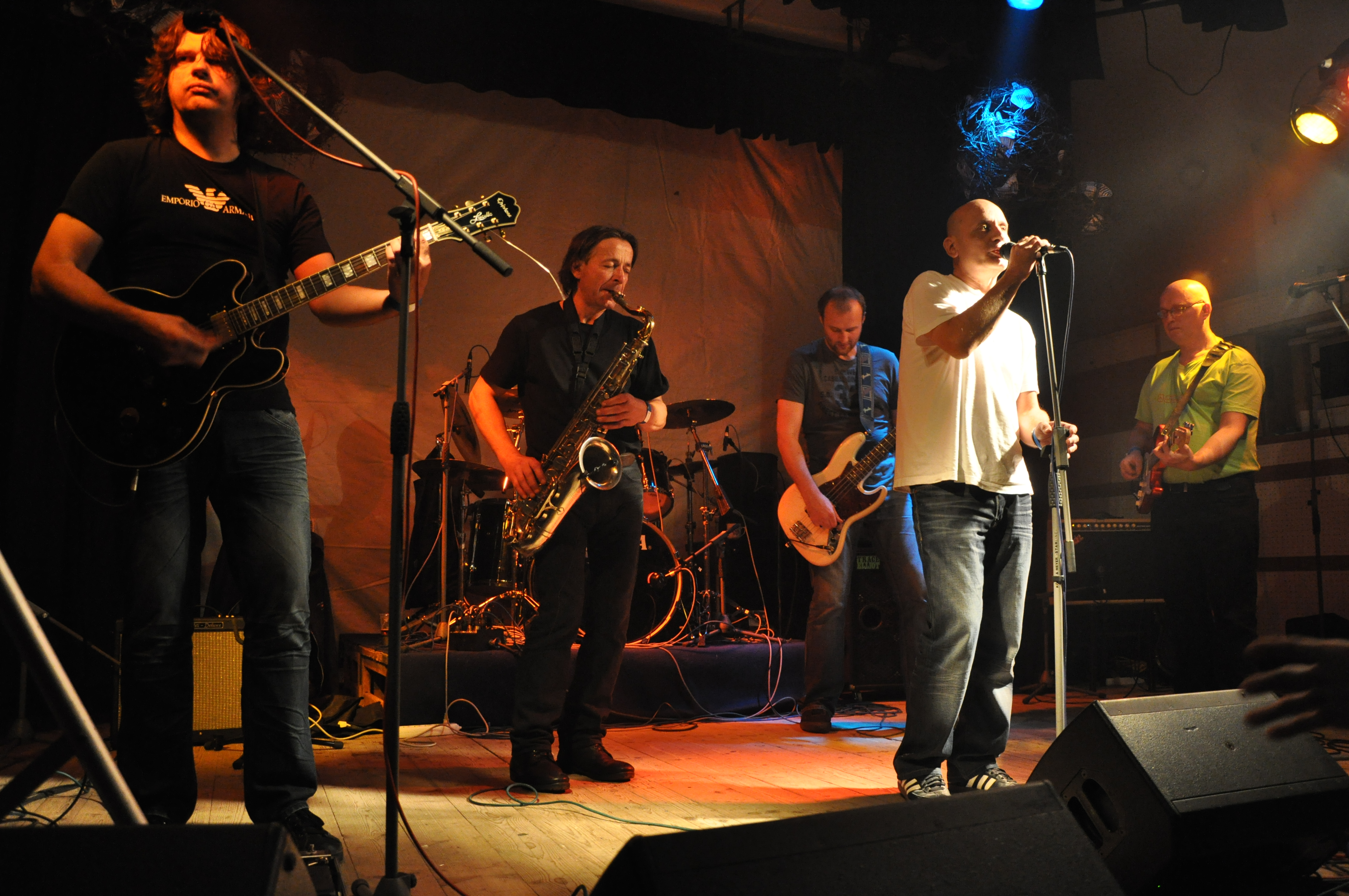
- Garage performing in 2011

Background information
- Also known as: Garáž
- Origin: Prague, Czechoslovakia
- Genres: Rock
- Years active: 1979–present
- Members: Tony Ducháček; Jan Macháček; David Fikrle; Honza Pokorný; René Starhon
- Past members: Ivo Pospíšil; Milan Hlavsa; Karel Habal; Tomáš Volák; Ian Losz; Ivan Cifrinec; Zdeněk Smetana; Josef Vondrášek; Antonín Pěnička<; Jaroslav Jeřábek; Joe Karafiát; Jaroslav Kvasnička; Robert Jína; Vladimír Zatloukal
- Website: garageband.cz

Garage is a Czech rock band from Prague, formed in 1979 by Ivo Pospíšil under the name Garáž. In the 1980s, the band included guitarist Milan Hlavsa, from the Plastic People of the Universe. After the Velvet Revolution in 1989, Garage played concerts abroad, including in New York City, Switzerland, Germany, Belgium, and France. In 1994, the group released the album Garage, produced by Ivan Král.

== History ==
Formed in 1979 by Ivo Pospíšil of DG 307, the band was initially called Garáž. In 1982, they were joined by singer Tony Ducháček, who became their primary songwriter. In the years 1983–84, the group's first demo tapes, Garáž... byla a je and Garáž? Na tu nemáš! emerged, and Milan Hlavsa, founder of the Plastic People of the Universe, joined up. Under the Communist regime during the 1980s, Garáž was rarely allowed to play officially, and they were mainly relegated to the underground scene. As they weren't allowed to release official albums at the time, their recordings circulated as samizdat on cassettes.

After the Velvet Revolution of 1989, all restrictions on the group were lifted. During the next few years, Garáž experienced the peak of their popularity. They performed across Czechoslovakia as well as overseas, including at clubs in New York City, Switzerland, and Germany and at festivals in Belgium and France. At that time, the band included guitarist Joe Karafiát, who lived in Canada for ten years and returned to Czechoslovakia after the revolution.

In 1993, following member disagreements, Garáž separated from founder and manager, Ivo Pospíšil, who continued performing under the band's original name. The remaining musicians adopted the English version of their old name and continued as Garage a Tony Ducháček.

In 1994, they released the album Garage, produced by Ivan Král.

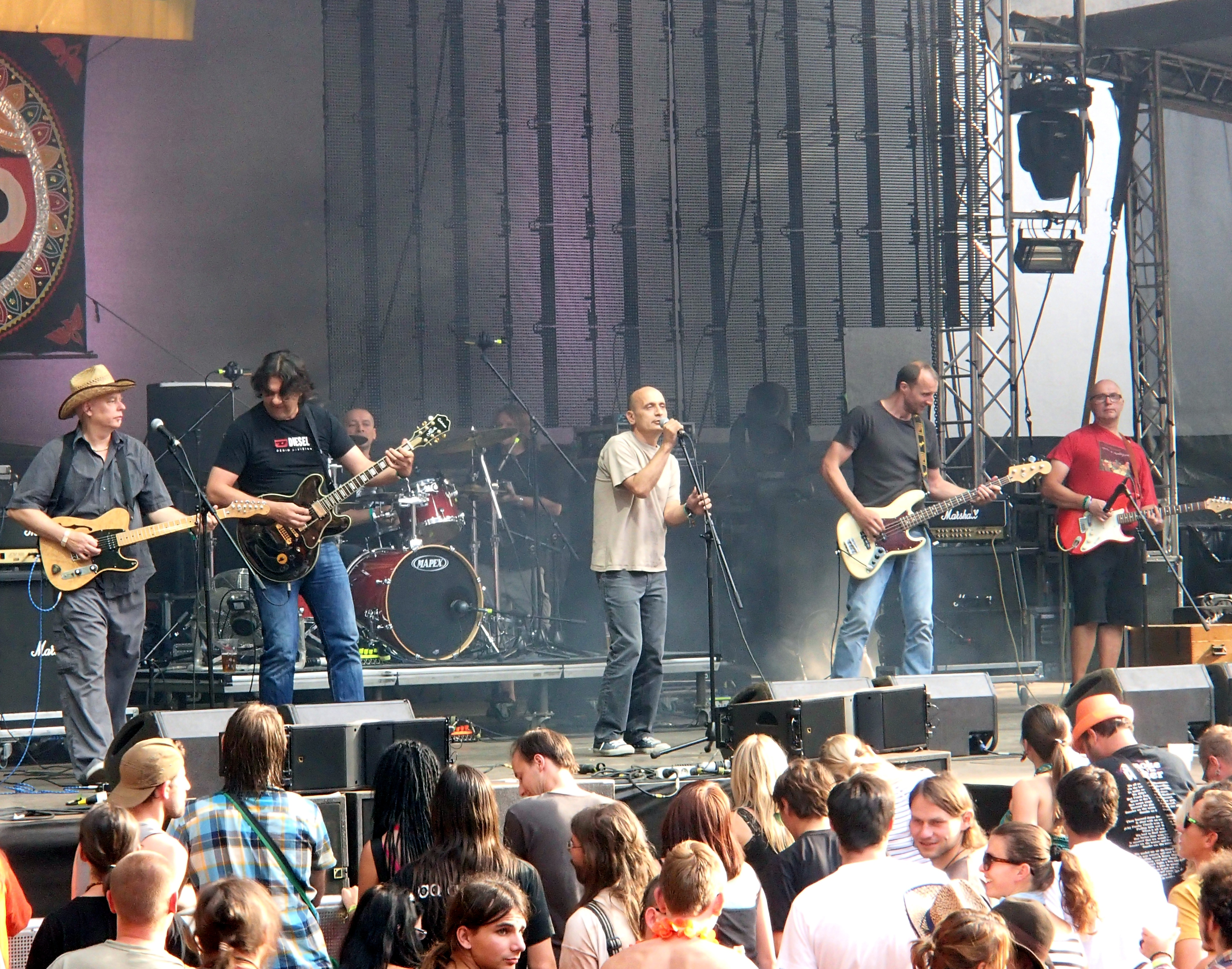
Garage at Trutnov Open Air Music Festival, 2013. L–R: Karafiát, Jína, Pěnička, Ducháček, Fikrle, Macháček.

== Band members ==
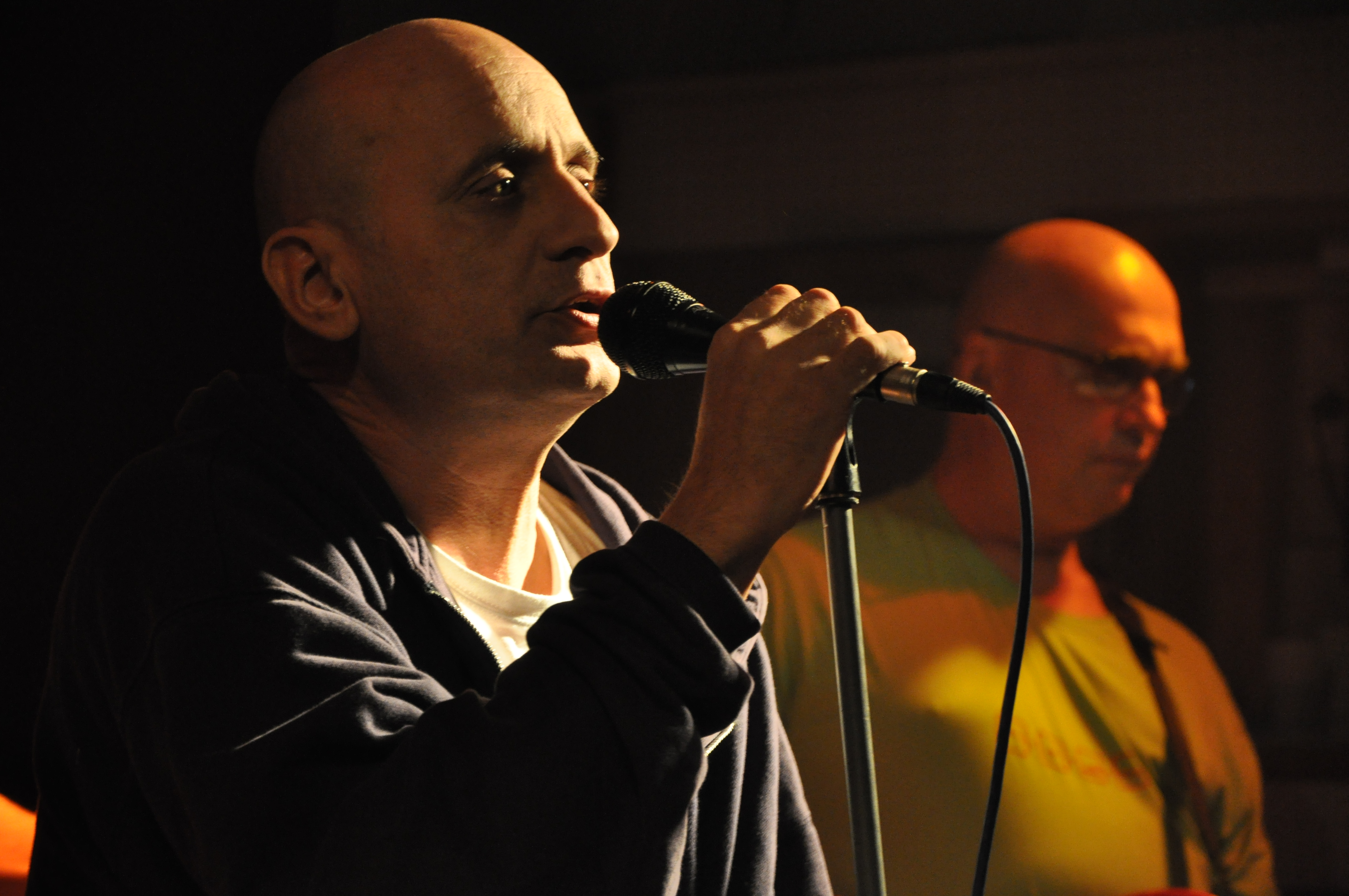
Tony Ducháček with Garage in 2011

Current

- Tony Ducháček – vocals
- Jan Macháček – guitar
- David Fikrle – bass
- Honza Pokorný
- René Starhon

Past

- Ivo Pospíšil – bass
- Milan Hlavsa – bass
- Karel Habal
- Tomáš Volák
- Ian Losz
- Ivan Cifrinec
- Zdeněk Smetana
- Josef Vondrášek
- Antonín Pěnička – drums
- Jaroslav Jeřábek – saxophone
- Joe Karafiát – guitar
- Jaroslav Kvasnička – bass
- Robert Jína – guitar
- Vladimír Zatloukal – guitar

== Discography ==
- Garáž... byla a je (1984)
- Garáž? Na tu nemáš! (1988)
- The Best of Garáž (1990)
- Vykopávky Praha (1990)
- Garáž – Demo (1991)
- Garáž – Praha (1991)
- Garáž No. 1-1981 (1993)
- No Parking (1993)
- Garage (1994)
- Apogeum (1996)
- Nepohádka (2000)
- BLACK! (2009)
- Live 2011 (2012)
