= Inflikted =

Studio album by Cavalera Conspiracy
- Released: March 25, 2008
- Recorded: July 2007
- Studio: Undercity Studios (North Hollywood, Los Angeles, California, America)
- Genre: Thrash metal; groove metal; death metal
- Length: 43:31
- Label: Roadrunner
- Producer: Max Cavalera & Logan Mader

Cavalera Conspiracy chronology
Inflikted (2008)	Blunt Force Trauma (2011)

Singles from Inflikted
- 1. "Sanctuary" Released: March 3, 2008

Inflikted is the debut studio album from Cavalera Conspiracy, the Cavalera brothers' first record together in 12 years - since the release of Roots by Sepultura in 1996.

== Album information ==
Max Cavalera had indicated that the music on Inflikted would be similar to Sepultura's early death/thrash-metal recordings but it would also have a heavy hardcore punk influence. The title track was originally released as a four-track demo entitled "Inflikted (After the Slaughter)" in May 2007, intended as a Soulfly track before being repurposed for the first Cavalera Conspiracy album.

The album was released on March 24, 2008. Two videos for "Sanctuary" were made, one of which is a censored version of the other. Both can be found on the band's website.

In 2008, speaking to Kerrang!, Max Cavalera remembered: "This was a stripped-down album that took me and Igor to our metal roots. It's like thrash, death metal and hardcore punk all rolled up, and it was easy because that's the stuff we like. It's the very heart of what Igor and I are about. The passion of metal and punk will never die. It was a new start for me and Igor - our first music together for 12 years and such a positive and emotional experience. We got over those nerves, and ended up having a great time making that album. Sometimes Igor would play so hard his wife wondered if he was on coke... It has a quality that is pure Max and Igor, not Soulfly or Sepultura or anything else out there."

== Critical reception ==
Professional ratings
Review scores
Source	Rating
About.com	4/5 stars
Allmusic	4/5 stars
Artistdirect	5/5 stars
PopMatters	(7/10)
Record Collector	4/5 stars

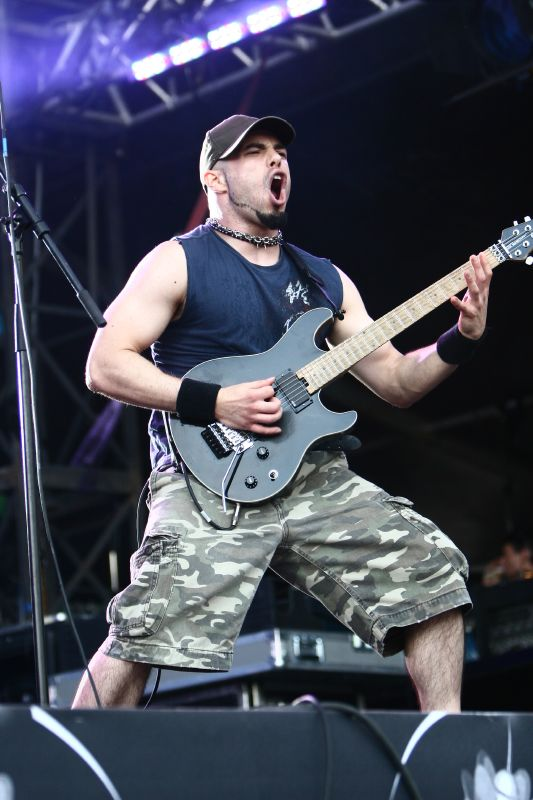
Rizzo's contributions to Inflikted, were praised by music critics

Reviews of Inflikted were generally favorable, with Adrien Begrand of PopMatters stating "Sure, it's not a Sepultura reunion, but having Max and Igor performing on record for the first time in a dozen years is as close as we'll ever get, and not only does Cavalera Conspiracy's Inflikted revisit the post-thrash sounds of 1993's Chaos A.D., but it manages to outshine anything Sepultura has put out in the last dozen years." Begrand also stated that the band "is as solid a metal supergroup as you'll ever come across, and the album's eleven tracks benefit hugely from the chemistry between the four musicians." Exclaim! magazine described the album as a "whole being fast, thrash-y and intense in ways that neither Soulfly nor Sepultura have managed to be in a while." IGN gave the album a mixed review, saying that Inflikted is a respectable debut, but is "unfortunately afflicted with bad lyrics". Phoenix New Times criticized the collaboration, stating that Inflikted "sounds more like the product of a weekend spent jamming in the garage than the efforts of two vital artists making up for lost time."

As Cavalera Conspiracy is a supergroup, critics also dedicated their reviews to evaluate the performance of musicians individually. Chad Bowar of About.com said that Max's vocals are "very distinctive, and his angry growls are as strong as ever." Eduardo Rivadavia of Allmusic praised Rizzo's contributions, saying that "his otherworldly soloing and inventive melodic lines often serve as the creative catalysts responsible for the most inspired moments," while Duplantier "generally just keeps a low sonic profile and his nose out of trouble". IGN gave similar praise to Rizzo, stating that is his "agile lead guitar playing that keeps the album from sinking into metal monotony in many spots."

== Track listing ==
All lyrics are written by Max Cavalera, except where noted; all music is composed by Max Cavalera, except where noted.

No.	Title	Lyrics	Music	Length
1.	"Inflikted"			4:32
2.	"Sanctuary"			3:23
3.	"Terrorize"			3:37
4.	"Black Ark"	Max Cavalera, Richie Cavalera		4:54
5.	"Ultra-Violent"		Joe Duplantier, Max Cavalera	3:47
6.	"Hex"			2:37
7.	"The Doom of All Fires"			2:12
8.	"Bloodbrawl"			5:41
9.	"Nevertrust"			2:23
10.	"Hearts of Darkness"			4:29
11.	"Must Kill"			5:56
Total length:				43:31

Japan edition
No.	Title	Lyrics	Music	Length
12.	"The Exorcist" (Possessed cover)	Mike Torrao	Mike Torrao, Mike Oldfield	3:26
Total length:				46:57

Digital edition
No.	Title	Length
13.	"In Conspiracy"	3:51
Total length:		50:48

== Charts ==
Country	Position
Australia	40
Austria	27
Belgium (Flanders)	40
Belgium (Wallonia)	89
Finland	21
France	47
Germany	27
Ireland	99
Italy	71
Netherlands	44
Switzerland	70
United Kingdom	77
United States	72

== Personnel ==
Cavalera Conspiracy

- Max Cavalera – lead vocals, rhythm guitar
- Marc Rizzo – lead guitar, additional vocals on "Sanctuary"
- Joe Duplantier – bass, rhythm guitar on "Inflikted", "Black Ark" and "Ultra-Violent", additional vocals on "Black Ark" and "Ultra-Violent"
- Igor Cavalera – drums, percussion, recording on "Must Kill" (outro)

Additional musicians

- Richie Cavalera – vocals on "Black Ark"
- Rex Brown – bass guitar on "Ultra-Violent"

Production

- Max Cavalera – production
- Logan Mader – co-production, recording, mixing, mastering
- Kanky Lora – additional Pro Tools
- Michael Rashmawi – additional Pro Tools
- Tim Laud – additional vocal tracking
- Dennis Graef – additional vocal tracking
- Ingo Schulz – additional vocal tracking
- Igor Cavalera – recording on "Must Kill" (outro)
- Laima Leyton – recording on "Must Kill" (outro)

Management

- Monte Conner – A&R
- Gloria Cavalera – management for Oasis Management
- Christina Stojanovic – management assisting
- Rod MacSween – booking for International Talent Booking (ITB)
- Steve Zapp – booking for International Talent Booking (ITB)
- Ian Sales – booking for International Talent Booking (ITB)
- Justin Hirschman – booking for Artist Group International (North America only)
- Laurie Soriano – representing for Davis Shapiro Lewit & Hayes, LLP
- Jeff Leven – representing for Davis Shapiro Lewit & Hayes, LLP

Artwork

- Max Cavalera – art direction
- Igor Cavalera – art direction, logo design
- Laima Leyton – logo design
- Sandrine Pelletier – art direction
- Surface To Air – art direction, design
- Santiago Marotto – photography
- Jens Howorka – back cover photography
- Kevin Estrada – band in-studio photography
- Charles Dooher – creative director
