= Johny Chow =

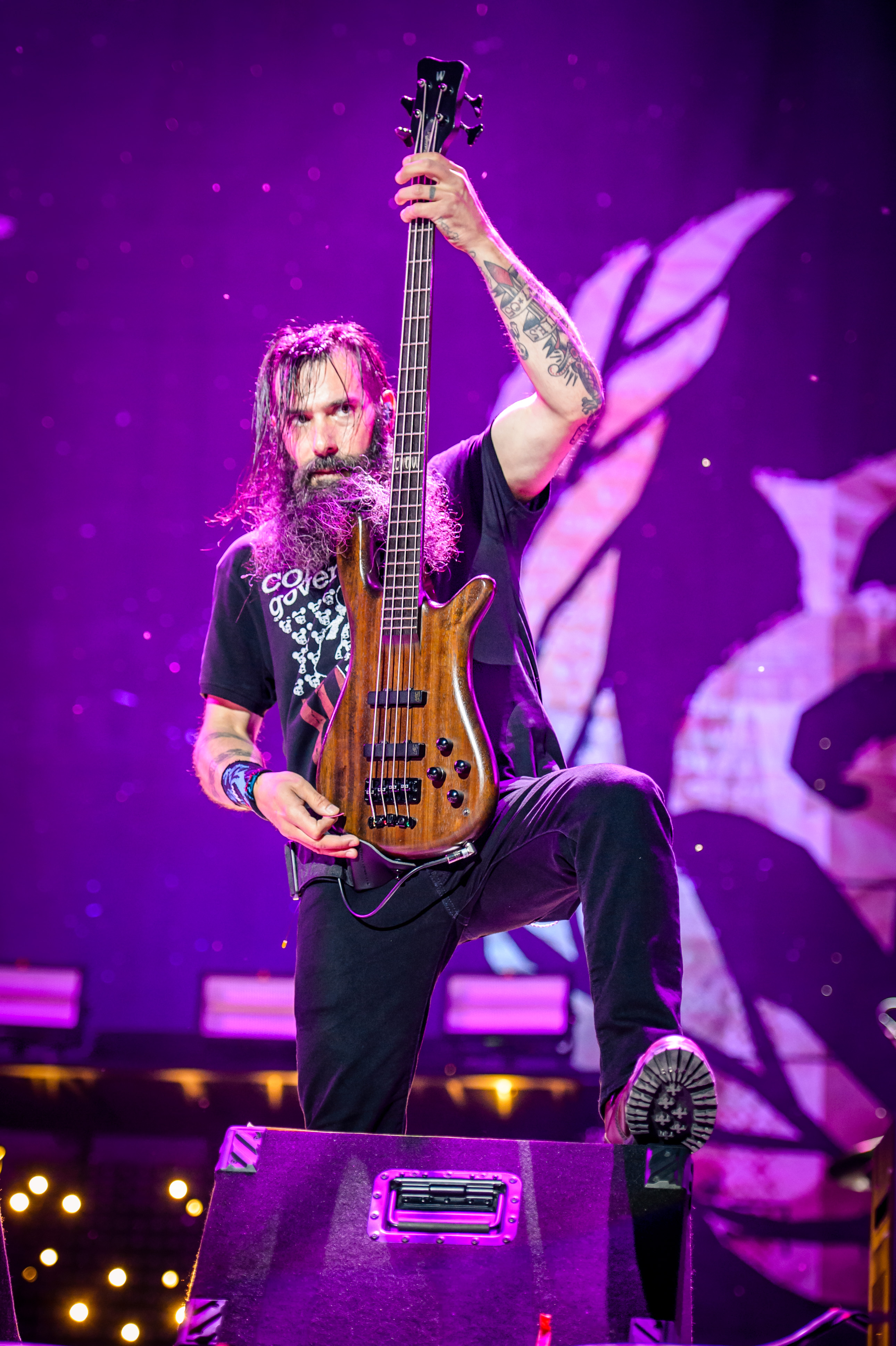
- Chow performing with Stone Sour in 2018

Background information
- Born: John Mark Bechtel; February 1, 1972 (age 54); Buffalo, New York, U.S.
- Instrument: Bass guitar
- Years active: 1995–present
- Website: twitter.com/inwalksthechow

John Mark Bechtel (born February 1, 1972) is an American musician and artist. He is currently the bassist for the rock band Stone Sour. He is a former bassist for the bands Cavalera Conspiracy, Souls of We, Fireball Ministry, My Ruin, Cortez, Systematic, Maximum Penalty, Echo 3, Pry, and Zero Tolerance.

== Chow Monstro ==
Chow Monstro is the art done by Johny Chow. Chow Monstro art has shared walls with street artists such as Sheppard Ferry- OBEY, Space Invader, Broken Crow, Seizure, ROA, and many more. The art has been seen in cities all around the world such as Los Angeles, San Francisco, New York City, Brooklyn, Chicago, Dallas, Austin, Cleveland, Columbus, Memphis, France (Paris), Germany, Poland, Brazil, Australia, and Italy. Johny Chow's art has been worn by artists such as Rob Holliday, Corey Taylor, Kevin Stabb, Max Cavalera, Rhubarb Flip, Igor Cavalera, Jacoby Shaddix, Bill Kelliher, Canaan Smith, and Compadre Clench. Chow has also had his art shown with Ron English (artist), Chet Zar, Gris Grimly, Kevin Kirkpatrick, Christopher Conte, Spine Stealer, Cam de Leon, Vince Locke, Cam Rackam, Cate Rangel, Krys Sapp, Sergei Silhouette, and many more.

=== Gallery exhibits ===
- November 2008: ARTCORE Presents: Honoring Metal Through Art Congregation Gallery
- February 2009: "FORGOTTEN SAINTS" GROUP SHOW Congregation Gallery
- April 2009: FANGORIA Grousome Art Ghoullery
- November 2009: ARTCORE Presents: The 2nd Annual Metal Art Show Congregation Gallery
- January- February 2012: CONJOINED II – The Seque Closing Party Copro Gallery
- January 2013: COMRADS ONLY PRESENTS: The Youth Contingent Big Orbit Gallery
- January 2014: Conjoined IV: A New Beginning Copro Gallery
- January 2015: Conjoined V: 666 Copro Gallery

== Discography ==
- Systematic - Pleasure to Burn (2003)
- Fireball Ministry - Their Rock Is Not Our Rock (2005)
- Souls of We - Let the Truth Be Known (2008)
- Fireball Ministry - Fireball Ministry (2010)
- Cavalera Conspiracy - Blunt Force Trauma (2011)
- Stone Sour - Meanwhile in Burbank... (2015)
- Stone Sour - Hydrograd (2017)
