= Trutnov Open Air Music Festival =

Annual music festival in the Czech Republic

Coordinates: 50°33′11″N 15°54′25″E

2005 Trutnov Open Air Music Festival banner

TrutnOFF Open Air Festival formerly known as Trutnov Open Air Music Festival, is a music festival in the Czech Republic that traces its origins to 1984 in the city of Trutnov. Since 1990, following the Velvet Revolution, the festival has been held annually.

== 2004 headliners ==
- Motörhead
- Tata Bojs
- David Koller

== 2005 headliners ==
- The Wailers
- Rachid Taha
- Dog Eat Dog
- Senor Coconut
- The Dhol Foundation
- The Slackers
- Superhiks
- Blackfire
- Yat-kha
- Fanfare Savale
- Brainless Wankers
- Kultur Shock

== 2006 headliners ==
- Living Colour
- Killing Joke
- The Presidents of The USA
- Hedningarna
- The Dhol Foundation
- MTO
- The Plastic People of the Universe
- Eva Pilarová
- Monkey Business
- Support Lesbiens

== 2007 headliners ==
- The Young Gods
- Billy Gould and Harmful
- The Race
- New York Ska Ensemble
- Tanya Stephens
- The Dhol Foundation

== 2008 headliners ==
- The Subways
- Stephen Marley
- Soulfly
- Voodoo Glow Skulls
- Shelter
- Ungdomskulen
- Dub Trio
- The Sex Pistols Experience

== 2009 headliners ==
- Primal Scream
- Anti-Flag
- Cavalera Conspiracy
- Candie Payne
- Enter Shikari
- The International Noise Conspiracy
- Pro-Pain
- The Plastic People of the Universe
- The Tower of Dudes
- Lord Bishop Rock
- Tagada Jones
- Trunk Show
- Eva Pilarová
- Monkey Business

== 2010 headliners ==
- Manic Street Preachers
- Rachid Taha
- Senser
- Dubioza Kolektiv
- Irie Révoltés
- Elvis Jackson
- The Flying Eyes
- Trunk Show
- The Tower of Dudes
- Monkey Business
- The Plastic People of the Universe

== 2011 headliners ==
- Iggy and the Stooges
- The Plastic People of the Universe
- Garage with Tony Ducháček
- Skindred
- Brian "Head" Welch
- Petr Váša & Ty Syčáci
- Monkey Business

== 2012 headliners ==
- John Cale from The Velvet Underground
- The Plastic People of the Universe
- Jessie Evans
- Anti-Flag
- Korn
- dEUS
- Yellowcard
- Jaroslav Hutka
- Garage with Tony Ducháček
- Vladimír Merta
- Petr Váša & Ty Syčáci
- Velvet Underground Revival Band
- Milan Smrčka a.k.a. Záviš
