= Joe Karafiát =

Czech musician

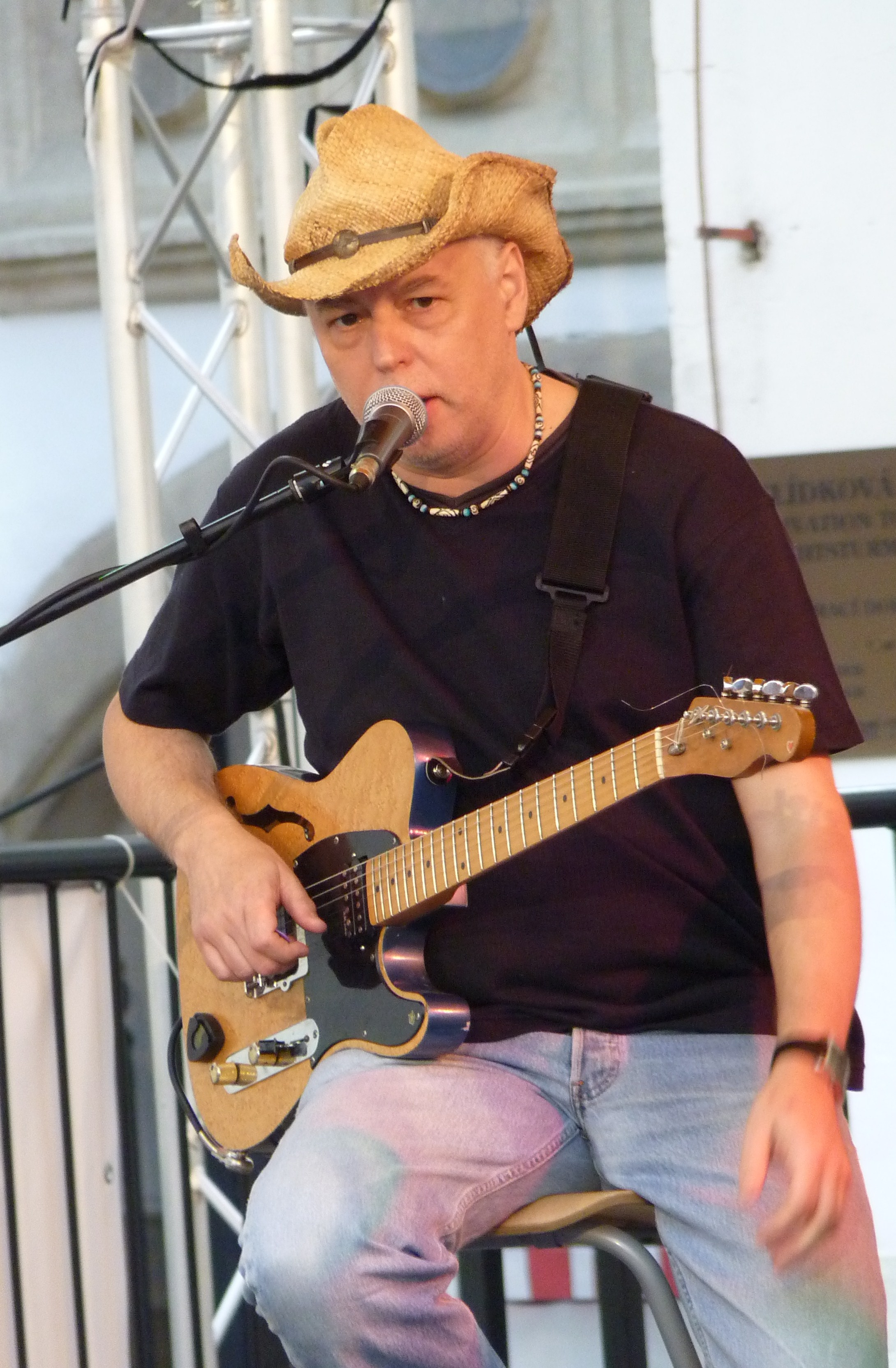
- Joe Karafiát (2010)

Background information
- Also known as: Joe Carnation
- Born: Josef Karafiát; 1957 (age 68–69); Prague, Czechoslovakia
- Genres: Rock
- Occupation: Musician
- Instrument: Guitar
- Years active: 1979–present
- Label: Guerilla
- Website: Official website

Joe Karafiát (born 1957 in Prague) is a Czech singer and guitarist. In 1980, he emigrated from Czechoslovakia to London and he left England after two years. Settled in Canada, he played with various musicians and also recorded an album with another Czech musician Vratislav Brabenec. After the Velvet Revolution, he returned to Prague, where became a member of Garage. In 1997, he joined The Plastic People of the Universe. In 2014, he released debut EP called Zodiak, which was produced by Boris Carloff. Same year, he guested on Dva divoký koně by Czech singer Dáša Vokatá.
