= Somewhere in Between (Systematic album) =

Studio album by Systematic
- Released: May 22, 2001
- Recorded: East Iris Studios – Tennessee; New Reflections – Tennessee
- Genre: Alternative metal, post-grunge, nu metal
- Length: 57:29
- Label: Elektra, The Music Company
- Producer: Peter Collins

Systematic chronology
Somewhere in Between (2001)	Pleasure to Burn (2003)

Somewhere in Between is the debut studio album by American rock band Systematic, released on May 22, 2001.

The band performed in August 2011 to celebrate the tenth anniversary of the album's release.

== Reception ==
Professional ratings
Review scores
Source	Rating
AllMusic	1.5/5 stars

Unearthed.com gave the album a positive review.

== Track listing ==
All tracks are written by Tim Narducci and Adam Ruppel

No.	Title	Length
1.	"Dopesick"	4:08
2.	"Beginning of the End"	4:22
3.	"Return to Zero"	3:53
4.	"Glass Jaw"	5:10
5.	"Deep Colors Bleed"	4:06
6.	"Mailbomb"	3:55
7.	"Bedsores"	4:56
8.	"Slowburn"	4:08
9.	"Somewhere in Between"	7:00
10.	"Of a Lesser God"	4:01
11.	"Pitch Black"	3:46
12.	"If Only"	5:06
13.	"Thick Skin"	3:04

== Personnel ==
Systematic

- Tim Narducci – vocals, guitar
- Adam Ruppel – guitar, backing vocals
- Nick St. Denis – bass, backing vocals
- Shaun Bannon – drums

Production

- Peter Collins – producer
- Andy Wallace – mixer
- Philip Bailey – drum tracks
- George Marino – mastering at Sterling Sound, New York
- Kevin Sczymanski – assistant engineering
- Steve Sisco – assistant mixing
- Fred Paragand & Tony High – digital media
- Lars Ulrich – executive producer

Artwork

- Nitin Vadukul – photography
- Alexis Yraola – album design

Management

- Nick John – Management for Rick Sales Management (Los Angeles)
- Michael Arfin – Booking Agent for Artist Group International (US)
- John Jackson – International Booking Agent at Helter Skelter
- Jefferey Taylor Light – Legal at Myman, Abell, Fineman, Greenspan & Light, LLP
- Julie Rene – Business Agent at Provident Financial Management, (San Francisco)
- Dan Mccarroll – A&R

== Charts ==
Chart (2001)	Peak position
US Billboard 200	143
Top Heatseekers	6
