= We Sold Our Souls to Metal =

Single by Soulfly

from the album Archangel
- Released: July 3, 2015
- Recorded: 2015
- Genre: Thrash metal
- Length: 3:00
- Label: Nuclear Blast
- Songwriter(s): Max Cavalera
- Producer(s): Matt Hyde

Soulfly singles chronology
"Ayatollah of Rock 'n' Rolla" (2014)	"We Sold Our Souls to Metal" (2015)	"Sodomites" (2015)

"We Sold Our Souls to Metal" is a single by American heavy metal band Soulfly. The lyric video of this song was unveiled on June 30, 2015 and is the first song played on the album Archangel. According to Max Cavalera, this song is a dedication to heavy metal and their fans, "This lyric video is a celebration of all forms of metal. This song was written as an anthem for metalheads all over the world! We gathered footage and photos from our tribe, showing how free the spirit of metal really is. Respect!".

This song is thrashy with punk vocals during choruses, though it ends in a very Pink Floyd-like way, which Cavalera was conflicted about saying, "I don't know why we did that. I still don't know if it was the right thing, but it came out like that. Marc [Rizzo] just did some really crazy guitars at the end of it that is just, like… It goes from total metal into crazy Pink Floyd, but it works. I mean, it's really wild. And we like wild stuff. I always was drawn to weird, weird stuff, and that's definitely weird, in a good way".
