= Bloodshed (song) =

Single by Soulfly featuring Igor Cavalera Jr.

from the album Savages
- Released: August 8, 2013
- Recorded: May–June 2013
- Genre: Groove metal; thrash metal
- Length: 6:55
- Label: Nuclear Blast
- Songwriters: Max Cavalera; Igor Cavalera Jr.
- Producer: Terry Date

Soulfly singles chronology
"World Scum" (2012)	"Bloodshed" (2013)	"Master of Savagery" (2013)

Music video
- "Bloodshed" on YouTube

"Bloodshed" is a Soulfly song, played as the first track of the Soulfly's Savages album. "Bloodshed" is the first Soulfly single released by the band's new label, Nuclear Blast (previously Roadrunner). This song premiered on the BBC Radio 1 Rock Show on August 6, 2013, two days before single was officially released.

Max Cavalera and his son Igor Cavalera Jr. wrote and sing this song together. Igor's punk vocals satisfied Max by explaining to Metal Exiles, "I needed a punk vocalist for the chorus and I was missing a punk vocalist to go with my vocals for the chorus. I knew Igor had a great punk voice so I called him because I knew it would be cool to sing with my son on the song."

== Lyrics and composition ==
Max said this: "The song is about the absurdity of the human condition in territories plagued by bloodshed all over the world. Not just recent events like Iraq, but also historical conflicts such as the U.S. Civil War, World Wars I and II, etc." During choruses, 'bloodshed' often pairs with 'wasteland' in lyrics.

Bloodshed plays at mid-tempo with few tribal sounds, specifically using a didgeridoo and a tribal drum.

== Music video ==
The music video for this song is available. The video depicts performers along with war involving classic weapons and uniforms used in the U.S. Civil War in the same spot where the battle took place.

== Personnel ==
Band members

- Max Cavalera – vocals, rhythm guitar
- Marc Rizzo – lead guitar
- Tony Campos – bass
- Zyon Cavalera – drums, percussion

Guest/Session

- Igor Cavalera Jr. – vocals

Miscellaneous staff

- Terry Date – producer, engineering, mixing
- Ted Jensen – mastering
- Sam Hofstedt – engineering
- Max Cavalera – writing
- Igor Cavalera Jr. – co-writing
