= Cavalera Conspiracy =

Brazilian-American heavy metal band

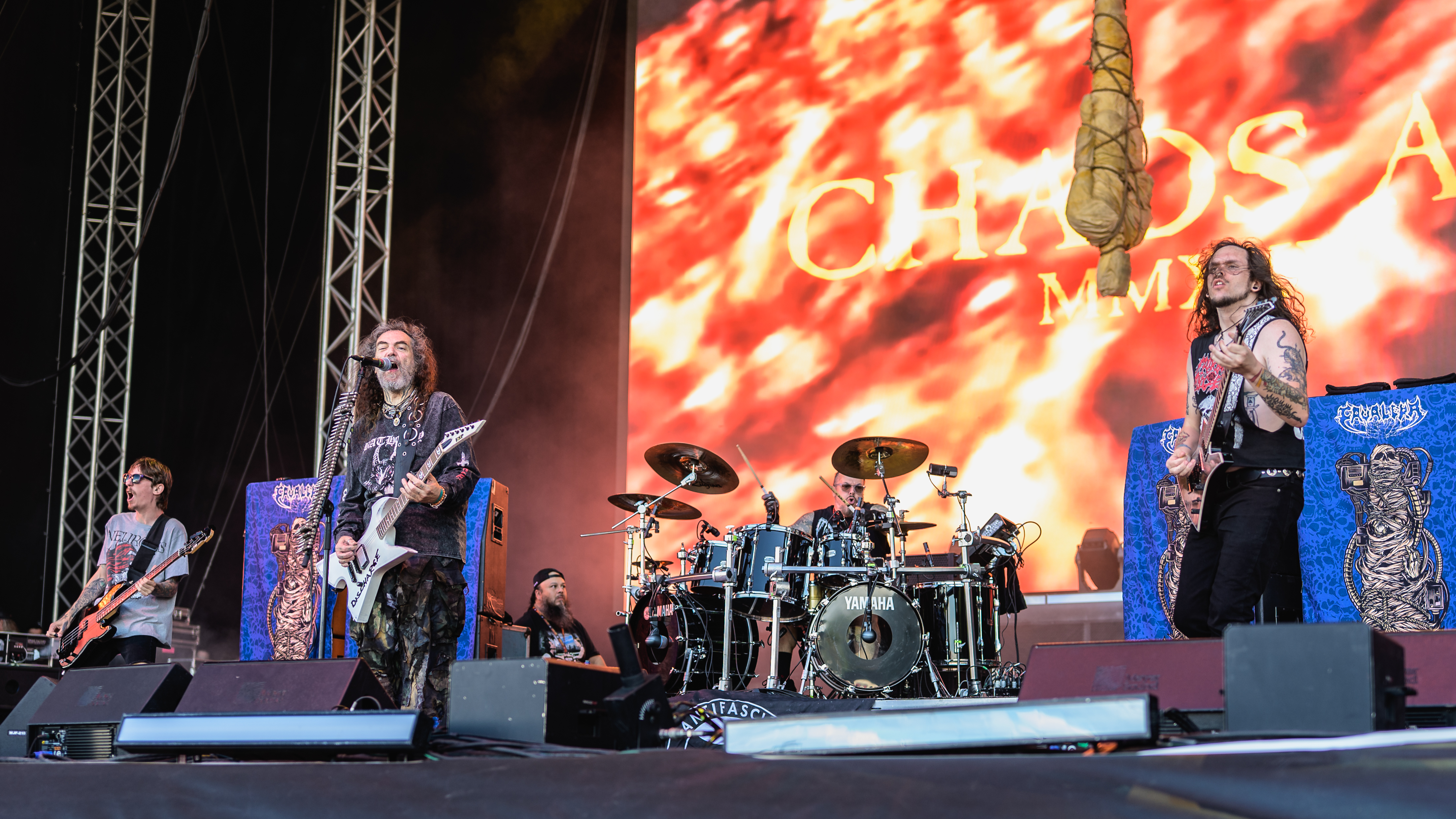
- Cavalera Conspiracy at Tons of Rock, 2026

Background information
- Also known as: Inflikted (2007); Max and Iggor Cavalera (2016–2022); Cavalera (2022–present)
- Origin: Phoenix, Arizona, U.S.
- Genres: Thrash metal; groove metal; death metal
- Years active: 2007-present
- Labels: Roadrunner; Napalm; Nuclear Blast
- Members: Max Cavalera; Igor Cavalera; Igor Amadeus Cavalera; Travis Stone
- Past members: Joe Duplantier; Nate Newton; Tony Campos; Johny Chow; Marc Rizzo
- Website: cavaleraconspiracy.net

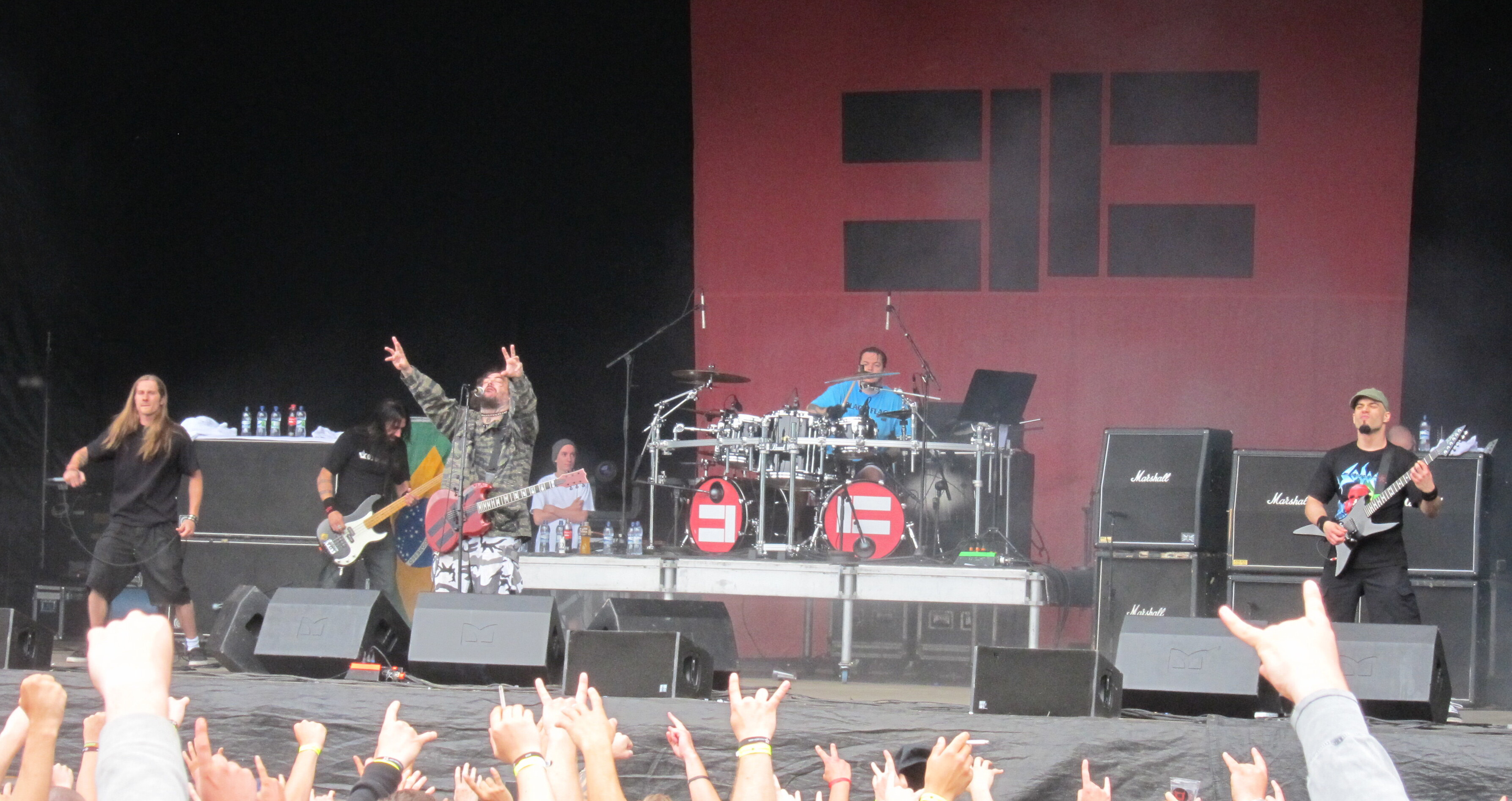
Cavalera Conspiracy at the Norway Rock Festival, 2010

Cavalera Conspiracy is a Brazilian-American heavy metal supergroup from Phoenix, Arizona, founded by Brazilian brothers Max (vocals, rhythm guitar) and Igor Cavalera (drums, percussion), who are widely known as former members of Sepultura and are the only two constant members of the band. The band formed in 2007 as Inflikted, but changed its name for legal reasons. The group's creation marked the end of a 10-year feud between the Cavalera brothers who founded Sepultura in the early 1980s. In 2022, they adopted the name Cavalera in order to release re-recorded editions of classic Sepultura albums in 2023.

Following the brothers' falling out, Max Cavalera formed a new band, Soulfly, and Igor recorded four studio albums with Sepultura before leaving the band in January 2006. In July 2006, Max received an unexpected call from his brother. By the end of the conversation, Max had invited Igor to visit him in Phoenix, Arizona, to perform in a Soulfly show. Igor joined Soulfly in concert and performed two Sepultura songs. After the show, Max suggested they begin a new project, and Igor accepted. To complete the band, Max chose Soulfly guitarist Marc Rizzo and Joe Duplantier of Gojira as bassist. The group recorded their debut album at Undercity Studios in Los Angeles with engineer and co-producer Logan Mader in July 2007. Named after the band's original moniker, Inflikted was released through Roadrunner Records on March 25, 2008. Cavalera Conspiracy has released three more albums since then: Blunt Force Trauma (2011), Pandemonium (2014) and Psychosis (2017).

== History ==
=== Background ===
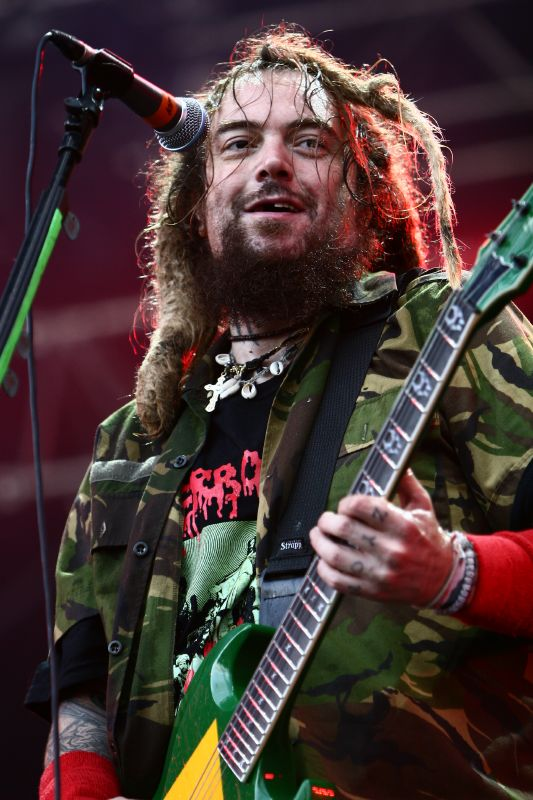
Max Cavalera stated that leaving Sepultura was the hardest decision he had to make in his life.

On August 16, 1996, at 1:43 a.m., Max Cavalera's 21-year-old stepson, Dana Wells, was killed in a car crash in Phoenix, Arizona. At the time, Cavalera was the lead vocalist for Sepultura, which was on tour promoting its sixth studio album, Roots, in England with Ozzy Osbourne. After hearing the news, Ozzy and his wife Sharon Osbourne hired a private plane to take Cavalera and his wife, manager, and mother of Dana, Gloria, back home. After the funeral, Max returned his focus to Sepultura, and the band resumed its European tour. Following a sold-out show at London's Brixton Academy on December 16—documented on the live album Under a Pale Grey Sky—drummer Igor Cavalera, guitarist Andreas Kisser, and bassist Paulo Jr. told Max they wanted to replace numerous members of the band's staff, including Gloria. Andreas, Paulo, and Igor proposed ending the contract with Gloria and hiring a new manager for Sepultura, saying that she paid more attention to Max than the band. The trio suggested that she could continue as Max's personal manager but that someone else should manage the band. Gloria's contract was up for renewal, so she let the band end it. Max felt betrayed by his bandmates, especially his brother.

In Revolver magazine's May 2008 issue, Max claimed that Gloria had worked for Sepultura for two years without pay. Disagreeing with the other Sepultura members, Max said, "If this is how it's going down, I'm out. I quit. I can't just put a mask on and backstab a bunch of people that trust me." Later, Max stated that it was the hardest decision he had to make in his life.

His departure from Sepultura caused a 10-year feud between the Cavalera brothers. During this period, Max formed a new band, Soulfly, which has released nine studio albums. Igor continued as Sepultura's drummer, appearing on the group's next four studio records before leaving in January 2006 to work on his DJ project, Mixhell, and to spend more time with his family.

==== Reconciliation ====
In July 2006, while Soulfly was on tour, Max received a call from his brother, and by the end of the conversation, Max had invited Igor to visit him in Phoenix for the tenth anniversary of D-Low, an annual memorial show for Dana. At the concert, Igor joined Soulfly and performed two Sepultura songs, "Roots Bloody Roots" and "Attitude," for which Dana had written the lyrics. In an interview with Chad Bowar for About.com, Max stated that performance was "the birth of Cavalera Conspiracy". After the show, Max suggested they begin a new project after Soulfly finished touring. Max confessed to Bowar that he lied to Igor when he said all the songs were ready when he had only finished one. He added, "It was one of those good lies. Everything rolled from there. What I like about the Conspiracy is that nothing is really planned. One thing leads to another. There's no pressure and it feels like a different project than anything I've done."

==== Name ====
Before talking with his brother, Max wrote the song "Inflikted," inspired by Sepultura's visit in 1992 to Indonesia where they saw a "crazy ritual". Describing what he saw, Max said, "There was self-inflicted pain, knives, blood, fire. It was insane. It stuck in my head." Max stated that "Inflikted" was supposed to go towards Soulfly's sixth studio album Conquer, but he wanted to do the song with Igor. For legal reasons, they could not use Inflikted as the band name. According to Max, "A lot of people had used it before, so he had to come up with something else." When trying to find a name, he "blurted out" Cavalera Conspiracy, and Igor liked it. Max added, "I think I like it better than Inflikted. It has a ring to it that connects me and Igor as two brothers back together."

=== Inflikted (2007–2009) ===
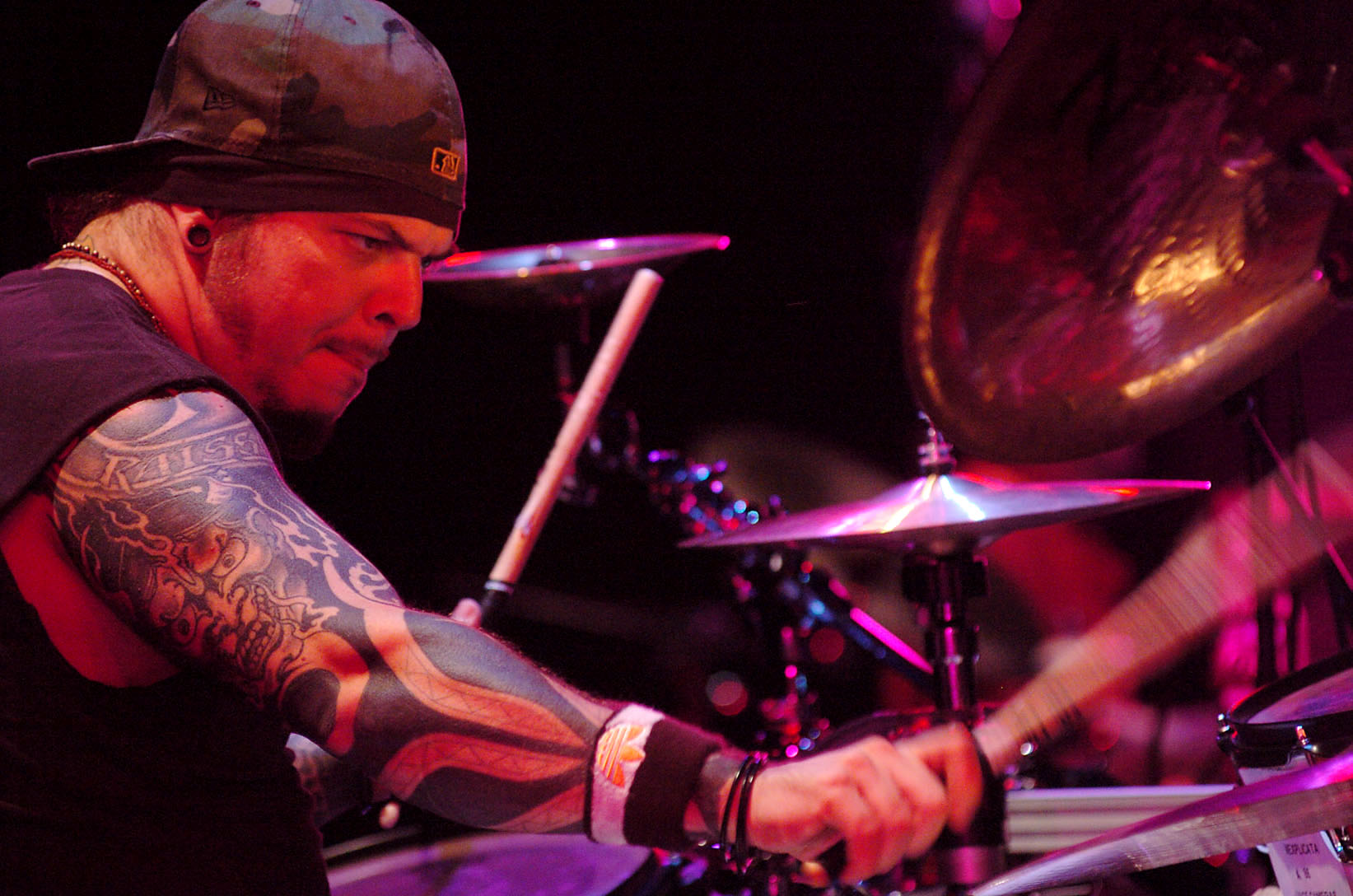
In 2006, Igor Cavalera left Sepultura to work on his DJ project, and to spend more time with his family.

To complete the band, Max chose Soulfly guitarist Marc Rizzo and vocalist Joe Duplantier of Gojira. Max picked Rizzo because, according to Max, they "play together in Soulfly and musically, we are like twin brothers". Max said that he talked to Rizzo about returning to the roots of mid-1980s thrash metal, which he did with Sepultura. Max continues, "Marc was completely into it and he did great. He surpassed what I asked him to do." Max stated that Duplantier was Gloria's idea, as he did not know him at all. He added, "We had no idea who the guy is, he's from a different continent and we don't speak French. I did know the Gojira CD. But I like the element of surprise and danger Joe brought."

In July 2007, the band recorded their debut album at Undercity Studios in Los Angeles with engineer and co-producer Logan Mader (who played in Soulfly for a year after leaving Machine Head in 1999) and Lucas Banker of the Dirty Icon production team. The album included guest appearances by bassist Rex Brown on the song "Ultra-Violent", and Max's stepson Ritchie Cavalera singing on "Black Ark". The band made their debut live performance on August 31, 2007, at the 11th Annual D-Low Memorial Concert in Tempe, AZ. Inflikted, named after the band's original moniker, was released through Roadrunner Records on March 25, 2008. Inflikted did not have great sales, reaching moderate positions on the charts. The album reached the top 30 on Austria, Finland and Germany, and the top 40 on Australia and Belgium. Having sold more than 9,000 copies during its first week, Inflikted peaked at number 72 on the Billboard 200 chart.

The Infliktour supporting the debut album began on May 30, 2008, when Cavalera Conspiracy played its first official concert at the Electric Weekend festival in Madrid, Spain. For this live performance and the subsequent European tour, the band had to replace Duplantier, who was unable to join Cavalera Conspiracy on the road as he was recording Gojira's fourth studio album, The Way of All Flesh. He was replaced with Johny Chow of Fireball Ministry. Between June and mid-July 2008, the band performed in several festivals, including appearances at the Pinkpop Festival, Rock am Ring and Rock im Park, Download Festival, Graspop Metal Meeting, Eurockéennes, among others.

The band returned to the United States for a North American tour from mid-July to August 2008, featuring headline dates with The Dillinger Escape Plan, Throwdown, Bury Your Dead, and Incite. Cavalera Conspiracy performed at the Monsters of Rock festival, held on July 26 at McMahon Stadium in Calgary, Alberta, Canada, and the one-day Ozzfest at the Pizza Hut Park on August 9. During its tour, Cavalera Conspiracy performed on several dates with Judas Priest at the Priest Feast throughout Eastern Europe, but the band cancelled their shows in Australia and New Zealand, which were scheduled for September 2008. In a press release, promoters claimed the cancellation was due to "logistic and freight issues", but Max Cavalera wrote on the band's website that they were "banned" from performing in New Zealand and Australia because someone—whom he did not specify—"deemed" them an "inappropriate" band and "too inflammatory".

Due to Max's commitments with Soulfly and Igor's with Mixhell, Cavalera Conspiracy was put on hold until August 2009, when the band regrouped to touring in Europe and Japan, including shows at the Ankkarock, Summer Sonic, Pukkelpop, and Trutnov festivals, and two September 2009 dates in Austria and Russia.

=== Blunt Force Trauma (2009–2012) ===
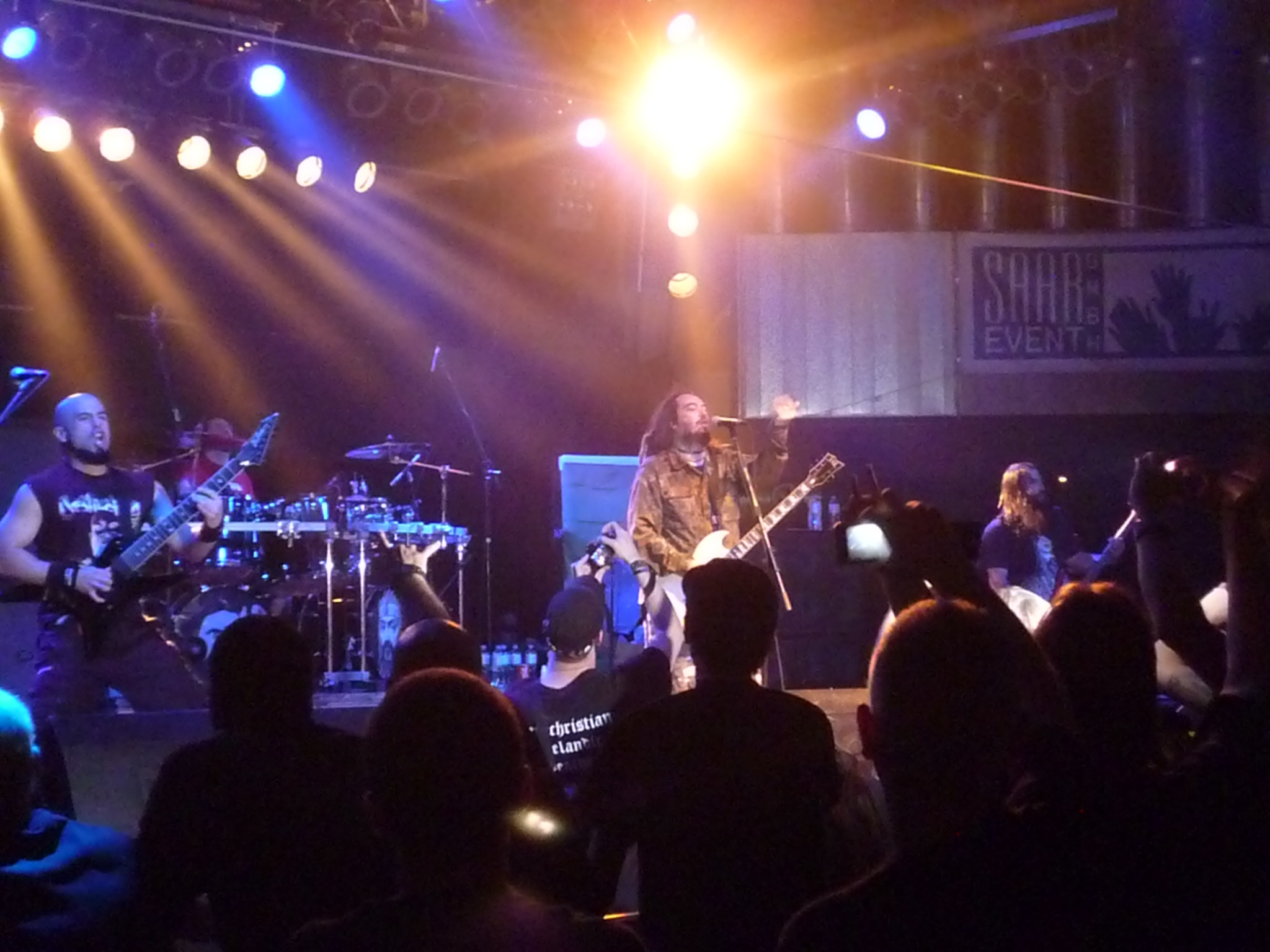
Cavalera Conspiracy performing in 2011

In October 2009, Max told Noisecreep that he and Igor had plans to work on a second Cavalera Conspiracy album. The following month, Noisecreep spoke with Igor about a new Cavalera Conspiracy album. Igor said that he and Max were both busy with their main commitments, but "we have some ideas of maybe doing a remix album of [Inflikted] and have people like Justice or Soulwax—even some dub artists that my brother likes—remix the whole album," he said. "But that's just an idea. It's nothing confirmed. But me and Max are talking about doing a new album in the future, but there's no pressure. There's nobody from the label or the agents trying to push us to do it as quick as possible."

Cavalera Conspiracy entered the studio in April 2010 to begin recording the follow-up to their 2008 debut album, Inflikted. In May 2010, the band finished recording with producer Logan Mader in co-production with Max. Cavalera Conspiracy recruited their touring bassist Johny Chow to play bass on the album, as Joe Duplantier was busy with Gojira's next album. When recording finished, Roadrunner Records confirmed that the band's new album would not be released until early 2011.

On November 16, 2010, in an article on blabbermouth.net, it was revealed that the band's second album would be titled Blunt Force Trauma, and would be released on March 29, 2011. A track list for the album was revealed.

Prior to the album's release, two songs were published by the band. The song "Killing inside" was released via the homepage of the band's label Roadrunner Records and the Cavalera Conspiracy newsletter. The download was only available from February 7, 2011, until February 9, 2011. The title track "Blunt Force Trauma" was released on February 17, 2011, as a stream via the Roadrunner Records homepage.

In a November 2012 concert in Belo Horizonte, original Sepultura lead guitarist Jairo Guedz joined the band (performing with Tony Campos on bass) to perform Troops of Doom.

=== Pandemonium (2013–2016) ===
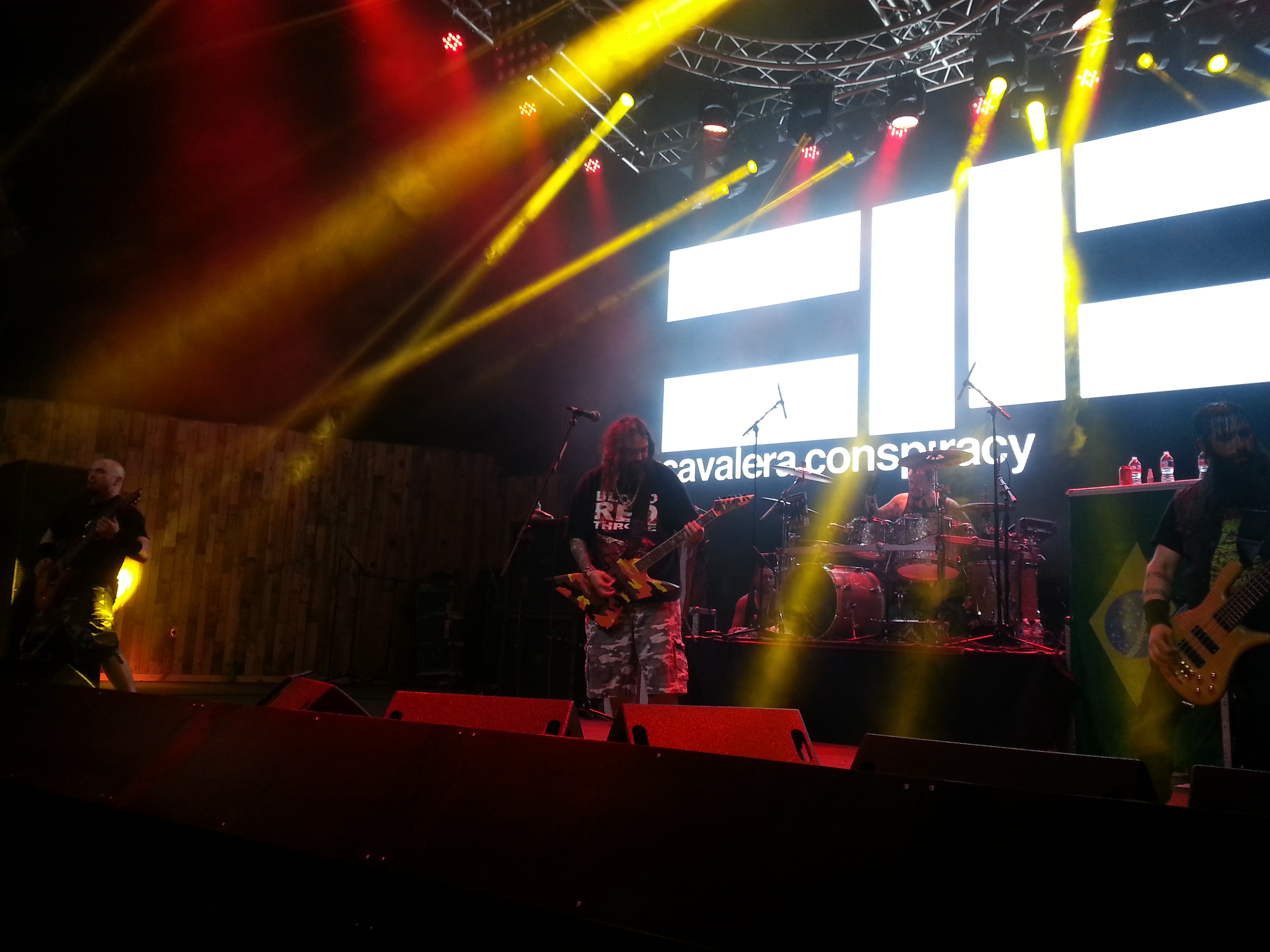
Cavalera Conspiracy performing in 2015

In September 2013, Max Cavalera stated his intent to begin work on a new Cavalera Conspiracy album in 2014, which would be predominantly grindcore. Igor implied on October 1 that the album could consist solely of the two brothers, without involvement from Marc Rizzo or Johny Chow, with the album produced by James Murphy. This proved false when Max's wife Gloria announced the trio of Max, Igor, and Marc entering the studio with producer John Gray in late December 2013, along with the announcement on December 31 of Nate Newton of Converge as the band's new bassist.

In August 2014, the song "Banzai Kamikaze" was uploaded to Napalm's SoundCloud account. The new Cavalera Conspiracy album, Pandemonium, was released on October 31, 2014, in Europe and on November 4, 2014, in North America. Bassist Johny Chow returned to Cavalera Conspiracy for live shows in 2015, although the group's Facebook page lists Chow, Newton, and Campos rotating live bass duties.

=== Psychosis and touring old Sepultura material (2017–2022) ===
In May 2017, it was announced that Cavalera Conspiracy had entered The Platinum Underground Studios in Phoenix, Arizona with producer Arthur Rizk (Code Orange, Power Trip, Inquisition) to record their fourth studio album and follow-up to 2014's Pandemonium. They revealed the album title as Psychosis, and a release date of November 17, 2017. The band announced that a studio documentary titled The Conspiracy Diaries was being produced simultaneously by Horns Up Rocks! On December 1, ahead of the band's European Headbangers Ball Tour under the "Max and Iggor Return to Roots" banner, Marc Rizzo dropped out, citing a "dire family emergency" and was replaced with Soulfly bassist Mike Leon. Cavalera Conspiracy were rumored to be touring with Sepultura in early 2018. It would have been the first time in over 20 years that the Cavalera brothers shared the stage with their former band. This proved to be false.

=== Re-recording Bestial Devastation and Morbid Visions (2023–present) ===
In April 2023, it was announced that Max and Igor had re-recorded the first two Sepultura releases, Bestial Devastation (1985) and Morbid Visions (1986). The first re-recorded track, "Morbid Visions" (from the album of the same name) was released on May 12, along with the title track from Bestial Devastation on June 16. Both re-recorded albums were released on July 14, 2023 under the Cavalera Conspiracy name on streaming sites, but using the name Cavalera on physical editions. Max's son Igor Amadeus Cavalera was recruited as studio and touring bassist for this period, while Possessed guitarist Daniel Gonzalez recorded lead guitar. Pig Destroyer bassist and former Lody Kong and Healing Magic guitarist (both bands of Igor Amadeus) Travis Stone was recruited to perform lead guitar on the Morbid Devastation Tour that year.

In June 2025, Cavalera announced a series of tour dates for the following fall, with support from Fear Factory and limited scheduled appearances by Slayer and Lamb of God. The Cavalera brothers stated that they would be playing the Sepultura album Chaos A.D. in its entirety at the performances.

== Artistry ==
Cavalera Conspiracy has been labeled as thrash metal and death metal. Revolver's Jon Wiederhorn pointed out that although the songs were arranged and recorded quickly, Inflikted sounds neither hastily executed nor incomplete. He noted a connection between Max's riffing and Igor's drumming as a chemistry that comes only from musicians who learned to play together and honed their craft through years of studio sessions and live shows. Wiederhorn described Inflikted as an "explosive flashback to the remorseless thrash and primal groove-metal Sepultura created between 1991's Arise and 1993's Chaos A.D. [...] The songs are raw and simple, yet graced with syncopated drum runs, experimental guitar flourishes, and sonic frills inspired by Max's love of reggae and Igor's fascination with DJ culture. The vocals are primal and savage, emboldened by a sense of urgency that's equal parts desperation, rage, and celebration."

On Inflikted, Max was the group's songwriter and lyricist. At the time of the album recording, he was watching the same four movies almost every day: Apocalypse Now, City of God, A Clockwork Orange, and La Haine. Max revealed to Revolver that he wanted to do something different, and it gave him a lot of ideas. He said, "What came out of this album was more than enough to fill the void of not working together for so long. It's pretty intense. From the first moment, it's war."

Allmusic's Eduardo Rivadavia said that release of Inflikted "brings to fruition one of the most anticipated yet most improbable reunions in heavy metal history." Rivadavia expressed that Duplantier "generally just keeps a low sonic profile and his nose out of trouble, but Rizzo's contributions really can't be overstated. [...] His otherworldly soloing and inventive melodic lines often serve as the creative catalysts responsible for the most inspired moments." Keith Carman of Exclaim! praised the group's musicianship on Inflikted, saying that "it wouldn't be a stretch to proclaim that Inflikted, with its detuned grunt, bombastic lyrics and hyperactive drumming, is the album that should have succeeded Sepultura's widely-acclaimed 1996 powerhouse Roots." Adrien Begrand of PopMatters wrote enthusiastically for both Cavalera Conspiracy and Inflikted.

Sure, it's not a Sepultura reunion, but having Max and Igor performing on record for the first time in a dozen years is as close as we'll ever get, and not only does Cavalera Conspiracy's Inflikted revisit the post-thrash sounds of 1993's Chaos A.D., but it manages to outshine anything Sepultura has put out in the last dozen years. Rounded out by Soulfly lead guitarist Marc Rizzo and, most impressively, Gojira frontman Joe Duplantier on bass and rhythm guitar, the band is as solid a metal supergroup as you'll ever come across, and the album's eleven tracks benefit hugely from the chemistry between the four musicians.

Joel McIver of Record Collector wrote: "Inflikted is gobsmackingly violent. The 11 tracks combine hardcore punk (without the crappy production) and thrash metal (without the clichés) to produce an insanely fast record loaded with references to their best work: Sepultura's Beneath the Remains and Arise. It's too modern to sound close to those records, of course, but in terms of attitude and riff weight it matches them beat-for-beat and riff-for-riff. Those thousands praying for the Max-era Sepultura line-up to reform can get off their knees: the key reunion has happened."

== Band members ==
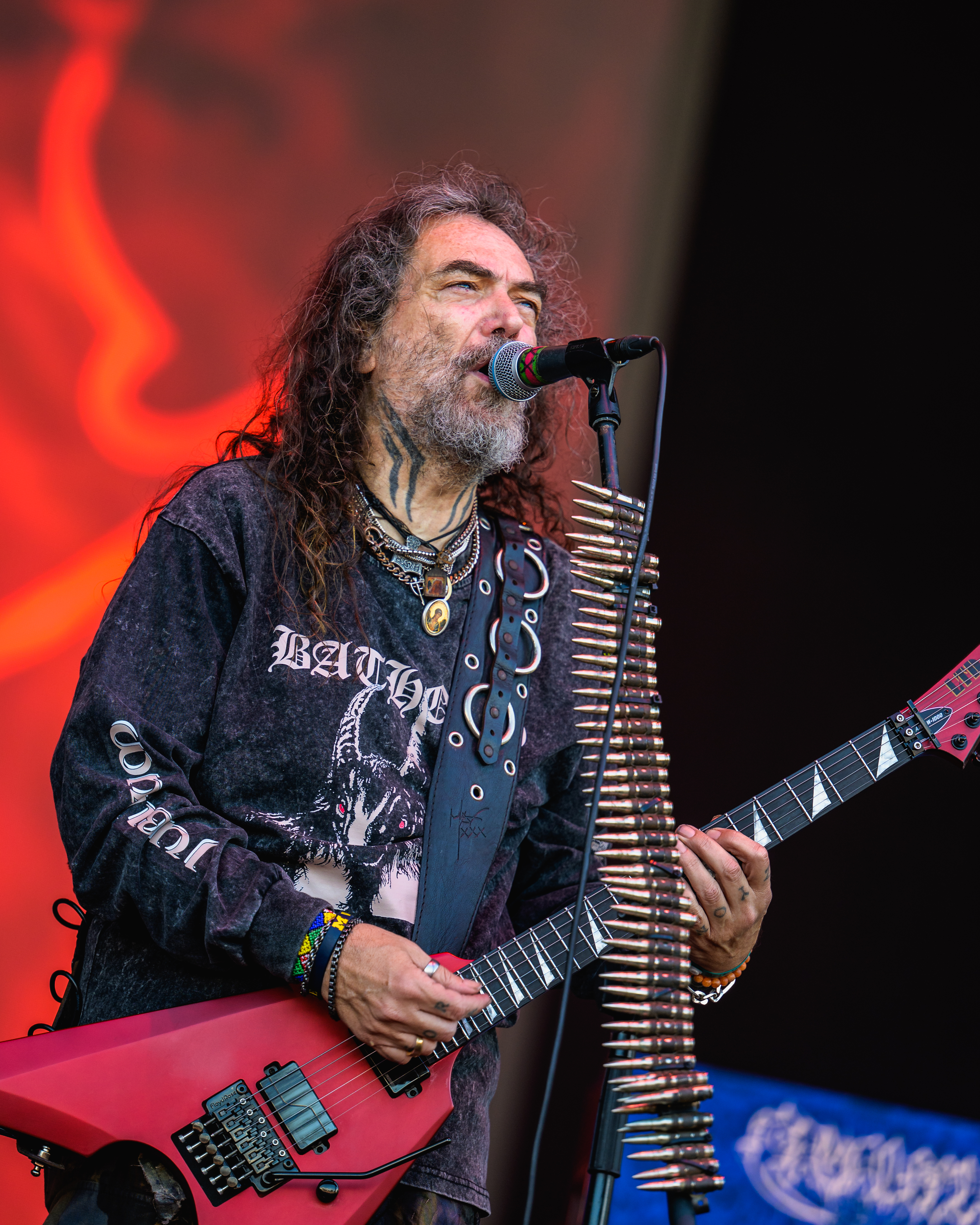
Max Cavalera, 2026

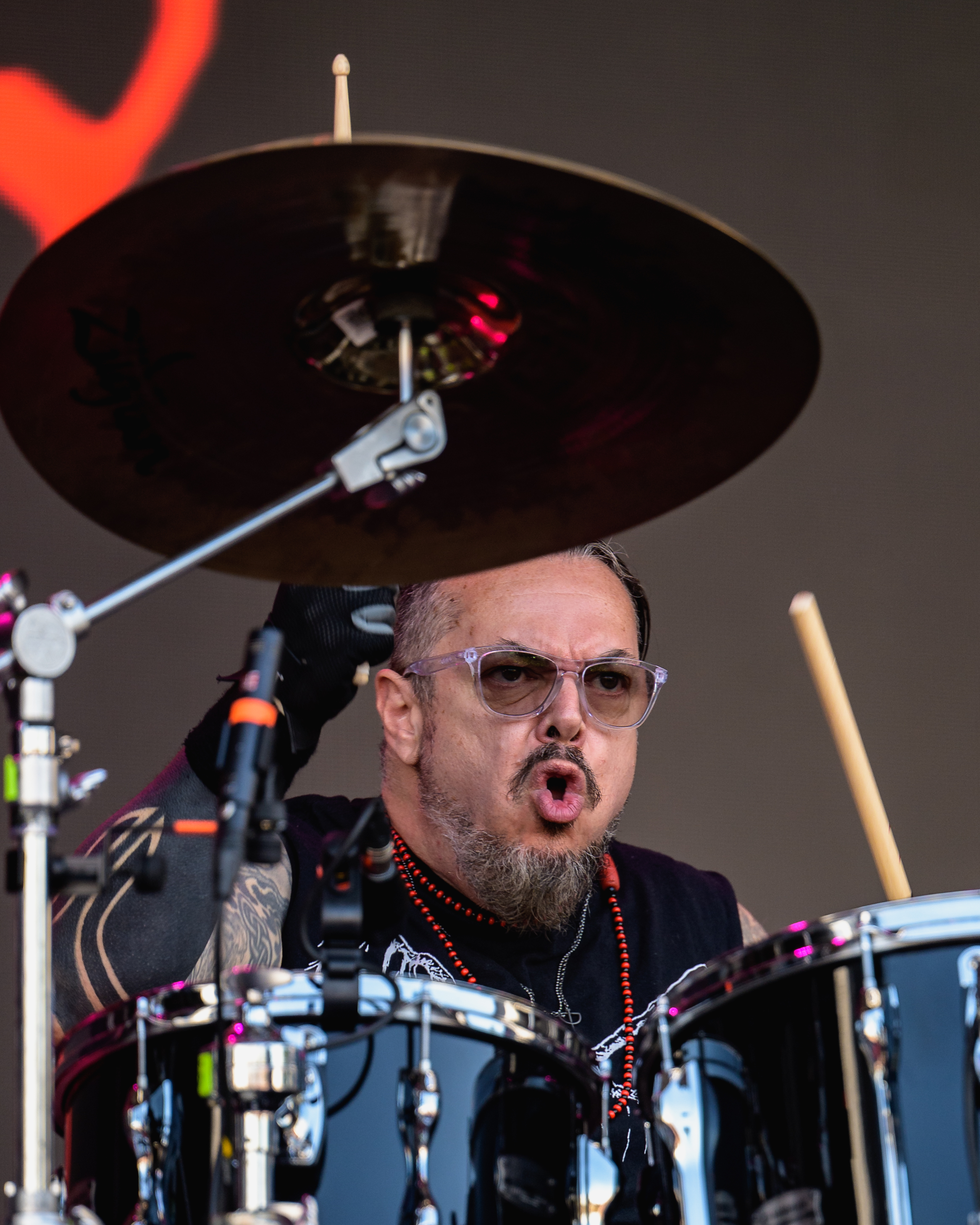
Igor Cavalera, 2026

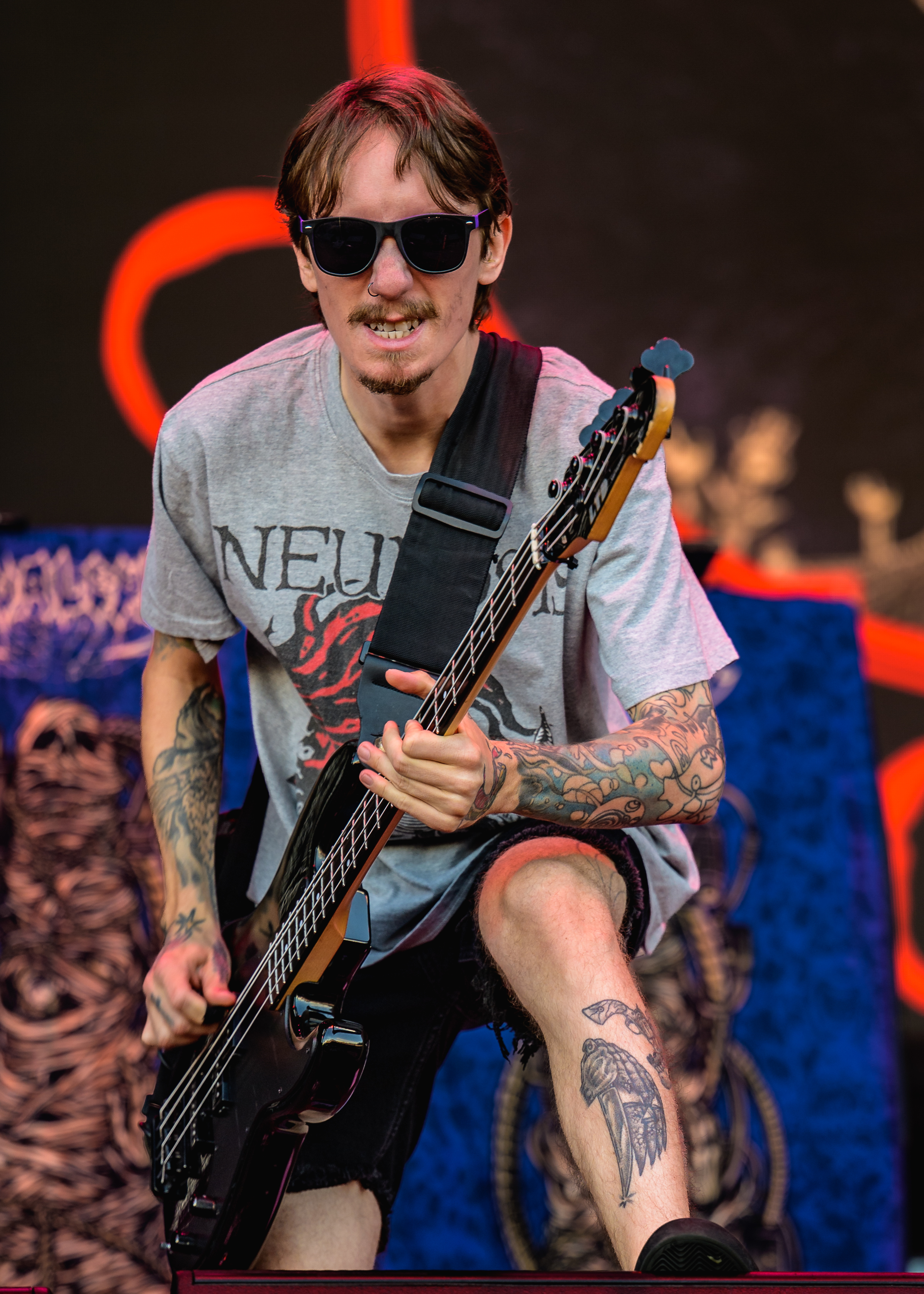
Igor Amadeus Cavalera, 2026

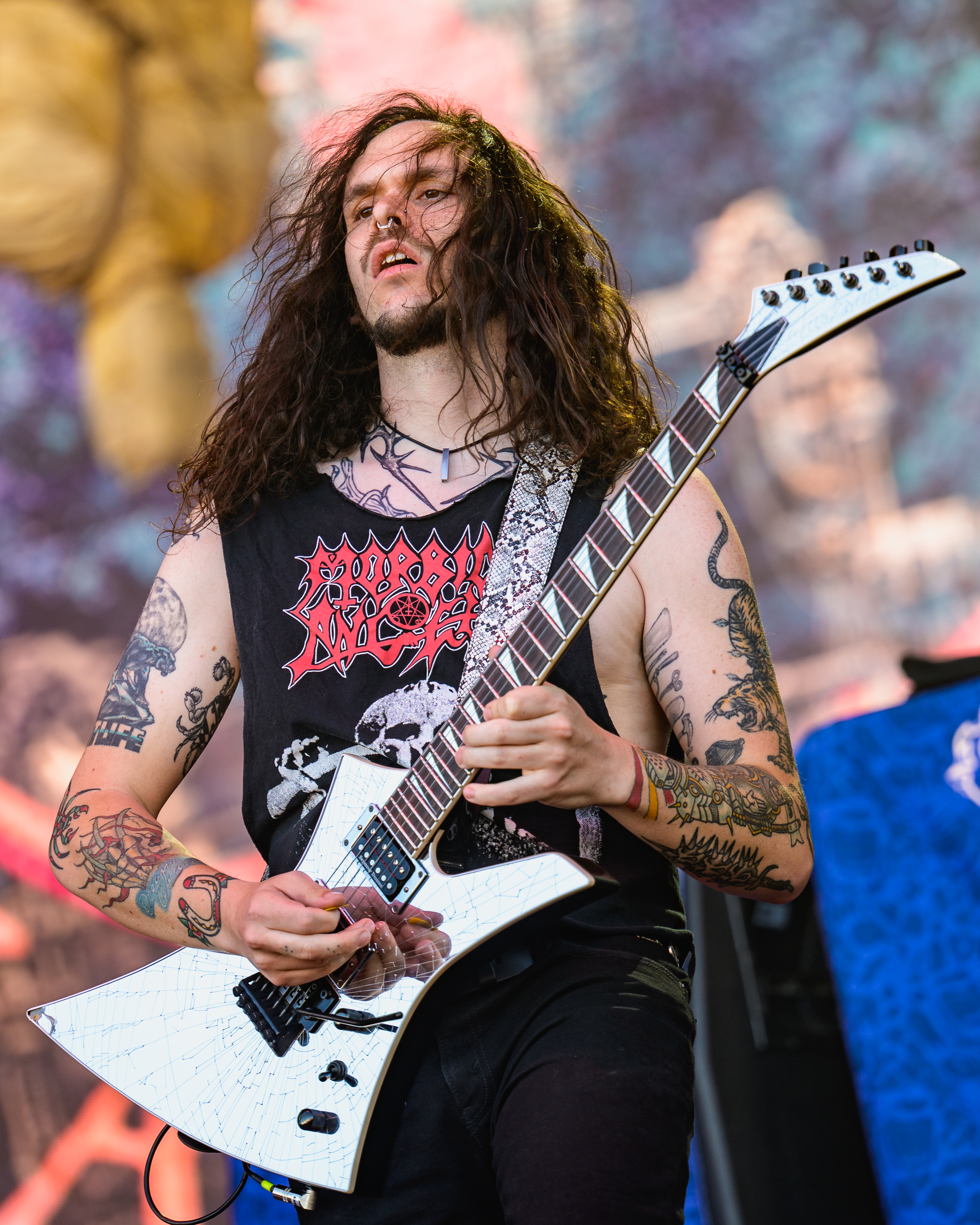
Travis Stone, 2026

Current members

- Max Cavalera – lead vocals, rhythm guitar (2007–present)
- Igor Cavalera – drums (2007–present)
- Igor Amadeus Cavalera – bass, backing vocals (2022–present)
- Travis Stone – lead guitar (2023–present)

Session members

- Arthur Rizk – bass, noise, synthesizer (2017)

Former members

- Marc Rizzo – lead guitar, occasional backing vocals (2007–2021)
- Joe Duplantier – bass, rhythm guitar, additional co-lead vocals (2007–2008)
- Johny Chow – bass (2008–2012, touring: 2015–2016)
- Nate Newton – bass, additional co-lead vocals (2013–2015)
- Mike Leon – bass, backing vocals (2018–2019, 2022), lead guitar (touring substitute 2017)
- Daniel Gonzalez – lead guitar (2022–2023)

Former touring members

- Greg Hall – drums (2011)
- Tony Campos – bass (2012–2014, 2016–2017, 2020)
- Dino Cazares – lead guitar (2022)

== Discography ==
=== Studio albums ===
Title	Album details	Peak chart positions										Sales
Title	Album details	JPN	UK	FIN	GER	AUT	SWI	AUS	NLD	FRA	USA	Sales
Inflikted	Released: March 25, 2008; Label: Roadrunner; Formats: CD, LP, DL	76	77	21	27	27	70	40	44	47	72	US: 9,000+
Blunt Force Trauma	Released: March 29, 2011; Label: Roadrunner; Formats: CD, LP, DL	99	99	35	45	46	59	31	74	92	123	US: 5,000+
Pandemonium	Released: November 4, 2014; Label: Napalm; Formats: CD, LP, DL	188	163	—	88	—	78	—	—	182	178	US: 2,600+
Psychosis	Released: November 17, 2017; Label: Napalm; Formats: CD, LP, DL	—	—	—	78	—	61	—	—	—	—	
"—" denotes a recording that did not chart or was not released in that territory.

=== Cover albums ===
Title	Album details	Peak chart positions
Title	Album details	GER
Morbid Visions (Re-Recorded as Cavalera)	Released: July 14, 2023; Label: Nuclear Blast; Formats: CD, LP, DL, CS	22
Schizophrenia (Re-Recorded as Cavalera)	Released: June 21, 2024; Label: Nuclear Blast; Formats: CD, LP, DL, CS	—
"—" denotes a recording that did not chart or was not released in that territory.

=== Extended plays ===
List of extended plays
Title	Album details
Bestial Devastation (Re-Recorded as Cavalera)	Released: July 14, 2023; Label: Nuclear Blast; Format: CD, LP, DL, CS

=== Singles ===
Title	Year	Album
"Sanctuary"	2008	Inflikted
"Killing Inside"	2011	Blunt Force Trauma
"Warlord"	2011	Blunt Force Trauma
"Bonzai Kamakazi"	2014	Pandemonium
"Babylonian Pandemonium"	2014	Pandemonium
"Not Losing the Edge"	2014	Pandemonium
"Insane"	2017	Psychosis
"Spectral War"	2017	Psychosis
"Morbid Visions"	2023	Morbid Visions
"Bestial Devastation"	2023	Bestial Devastation
"Escape to the Void"	2024	Schizophrenia
"From the Past Comes the Storms"	2024	Schizophrenia

=== Music videos ===
Year	Title	Director	Album
2008	"Sanctuary"	Rozan & Schmeltz	Inflikted
2011	"Killing Inside"	—	Blunt Force Trauma
2014	"Babylonian Pandemonium"	—	Pandemonium
2017	"Spectral War"	Paul Booth	Psychosis
2023	"Troops of Doom"	Ben Clarkson	Morbid Visions
2024	"Escape to the Void"	Costin Chioreanu	Schizophrenia
2024	"From the Past Comes the Storms"	Costin Chioreanu	Schizophrenia
2024	"Nightmares of Delirium"	Costin Chioreanu	Schizophrenia
