= Violent Delight =

British punk band

- Origin: St Albans, Hertfordshire, England
- Genres: Punk, nu metal
- Years active: 2000–2006
- Label: WEA
- Past members: Rodney Henderson; Ken Hayakawa; Ben Macrow; Tom Steenvoorden

Violent Delight were a punk/nu metal band from St Albans, Hertfordshire, England. Violent Delight were signed to Warner Music Group from 2002. The band released their debut album Transmission on 15 September 2003 which reached number 96 on the UK Albums Chart. They are best known for their two UK Singles Chart top 40 hits "I Wish I Was A Girl" and "All You Ever Do".

== History ==
=== Hands Up! If You've Got VD and early years ===
In 2000, Violent Delight, consisting of Rodney and Tom released "Hands Up! If You've Got VD", a 9 track Extended Play demo. They followed this in 2001, by being signed to J Albert & Son publishers, and Hayakawa and Macrow joined later that year. A year later they toured with A, Rival Schools, Ill Niño and Suicidal Tendencies, and released "Secret Smile" and "Same Old Story" on limited edition vinyl. Despite their youth, with Henderson and Tom both being sixteen at the time, the band were signed to a recording contract with Warner Bros. Records UK in 2002.

=== Transmission and success ===
Their first single, "Secret Smile" was produced by Sex Pistols guitarist Steve Jones and gained rotation on Kerrang! television and P-Rock, the song reached number 89 on the UK Singles Chart in 2002. A second single was released in 2002, "Same Old Story" was issued as a 7" Vinyl Record but failed to make an impact on the top 100. Violent Delight's next two singles were produced by Ill Niño drummer Dave Chavarri. The third single "I Wish I Was a Girl", reached number 25 in the UK in 2003 and the band's fourth single "All You Ever Do" also reached the top 40 at number 38. "Transmission" was released as Violent Delight's final single but failed to make the same impact on the charts, missing the top 40 and reaching number 63.

The band's debut album, "Transmission" was released on 15 September 2003, the album entered the UK Albums Chart at number 96 spending one week in the top 100. The Album received mixed reviews upon release. Kerrang! who initially supported the band with regular features on the magazines compilation albums were particularly negative.

=== Departure of Tom Steenvoorden and breakup ===
In November 2003 guitarist Tom Steenvoorden departed the band citing creative differences. The band decided to continue on without him although by mid 2005 Henderson and Hayakawa launched a new band named SuzyHope. Bassist Ben Macrow and Vex Red guitarist Nick Goulding created their new band Selladore. With no new record or singles released the band disappeared from the mainstream, performing one last farewell gig to a sell-out crowd at the Camden Barfly, London on 10 November 2006. Lead singer Henderson currently fronts the four-piece rock band Just A Ride.

== Band members ==
=== Former members ===
- Rodney Henderson – vocals (2000–2006)
- Ken Hayakawa – drums (2000–2006)
- Ben Macrow – bass (2000–2006)
- Tom Steenvoorden – guitar (2000–2003)

== Discography ==
=== Studio albums ===
List of albums, with selected chart positions
Title	Album details	Peak chart positions	
Title	Album details	UK	UK Rock
Transmission	Released: 15 September 2003; Label: WEA (2564602232); Formats: CD, DL	96	12

=== EP's ===
List of albums, with selected chart positions
Title	Album details
Hands Up If You've Got VD	Released: 2000; Label: Warner Music Group; Formats: CD, DL

=== Singles ===
Title	Year	Peak chart positions			Album
Title	Year	UK	UK Rock	SCO	Album
"Secret Smile"	2002	89	6	—	Transmission
"Same Old Story"	2002	170	24	—	Transmission
"I Wish I Was A Girl"	2003	25	2	29	Transmission
"All You Ever Do"	2003	38	7	45	Transmission
"Transmission"	2003	64	9	73	Transmission
"—" denotes a recording that did not chart or was not released in that territory.
