= Pleasure to Burn (Systematic album) =

Pleasure To Burn

Studio album by Systematic
- Released: April 15, 2003
- Studio: Bay 7 Studios (Valley Village, California) Sparky Darky Studios (Calabasas, California)
- Genre: Hard rock, alternative metal
- Length: 48:02
- Label: Elektra
- Producer: Howard Benson

Systematic chronology
Somewhere in Between (2001)	Pleasure To Burn (2003)

Pleasure to Burn is the second studio album by American rock band Systematic, released on April 15, 2003.

== Reception ==
Professional ratings
Review scores
Source	Rating
AllMusic	2.5/5 stars

The vocals in the album have been compared to that of Layne Staley of Alice in Chains.

== Track listing ==
All tracks are written by Tim Narducci.

No.	Title	Length
1.	"Not Like You"	2:38
2.	"Breakable"	3:39
3.	"Infected"	3:39
4.	"Right Before You"	4:42
5.	"Shine"	3:45
6.	"The Water Cure"	4:33
7.	"They Say (My Soul Was Lost)"	3:43
8.	"Pleasure to Burn"	4:03
9.	"Change"	3:06
10.	"Where We Live and Die"	3:44
11.	"Leaving Only Scars"	4:31
12.	"Jane Doe"	3:57
13.	"I'll Get By"	2:59

== Personnel ==
- Tim Narducci - vocals and guitar
- Adam Ruppel - guitar
- Johnny Bechtel - bass
- Paul Bostaph - drums

== Production notes ==
- Mixed by Mike Plotnikoff and Howard Benson at Skip Saylor Devonshire Studios, North Hollywood, California
- Recorded by Mike Plotnikoff at Bay 7 Studios, Valley Village, California and Sparky Dark Studio, Calabasas, California
- Mastered by Tom Baker at Precision Mastering, Hollywood, California
