= Transmission (Violent Delight album) =

Studio album by Violent Delight
- Released: 15 September 2003
- Studio: Water Music Recorders (Hoboken, New Jersey); Albert Studios (Sydney)
- Genre: Punk rock; Nu metal
- Length: 38:02
- Label: WEA
- Producer: Dave Chavarri; Steve Jones

Violent Delight chronology
| Hands Up If You've Got VD (2000) | Transmission (2003) |

Transmission is the debut album by the English punk/metal band Violent Delight, it was released on 15 September 2003 and distributed by WEA records. The album fared poorly on the UK Albums Chart upon release reaching number 96, although it managed to reach number 12 on the UK Rock & Metal Albums Chart.

== Track listing ==
All tracks are written by Violent Delight

| No. | Title | Length |
|---|---|---|
| 1. | "Shattered" | 2:32 |
| 2. | "All You Ever Do (The Slut Who Loved Me)" | 2:33 |
| 3. | "Transmission" | 3:16 |
| 4. | "I'll Be Waiting" | 3:04 |
| 5. | "Alone" | 2:28 |
| 6. | "I Wish I Was A Girl" | 2:41 |
| 7. | "Parental Guidance" | 3:57 |
| 8. | "Same Old Story" | 3:17 |
| 9. | "Secret Smile" | 2:43 |
| 10. | "Mistakes" | 3:03 |
| 11. | "Jump" | 4:00 |
| 12. | "Like Them" | 3:52 |
| 13. | "Rodney's Voice Mail" (hidden track) | 0:40 |
| Total length: | | 38:02 |

== Personnel ==
Violent Delight

- Rodney Henderson – vocals
- Ken Hayakawa – drums
- Ben Macrow – bass
- Tom Steenvoorden – guitar

Technical personnel

- Art Direction, Design – Mat Maitland, Richard Andrews (6)
- Artwork [Drawings] – Jody Barton
- Engineer – Dan Korneff (tracks: 1, 2, 4, 12), Paul Hoare* (tracks: 3, 6, 11)
- Engineer [Additional] – Guillermo 'Will' Maya* (tracks: 3, 6, 11)
- Engineer [Assistant] – Dave Chavarri (tracks: 1, 2, 4, 12)
- Keyboards, Programmed By – Omar Clavijo (tracks: 1, 2, 4, 12)
- Mixed By – Eddie Wohl (tracks: 1, 2, 4–12), Paul Orofino (tracks: 1, 2, 4–12), Rob Caggiano (tracks: 1, 2, 4–12)
- Producer – Dave Chavarri (tracks: 1, 2, 4, 5, 10, 12), Steve Jones (2) (tracks: 3, 7, 8, 9, 11)
- Recorded By – Paul Hoare* (tracks: 7, 8)
- Recorded By [Assistant] – Guillermo 'Will' Maya* (tracks: 7, 8)
- Written-By – B. Macrow* (tracks: 2–4, 7–11), K. Hayakawa* (tracks: 1–5, 7–12), R. Henderson* (tracks: 1–12), T. Steenvoorden* (tracks: 1–12)

== Charts ==
=== Weekly charts ===
| Chart (2003) | Peak position |
|---|---|
| UK Albums (OCC) | 96 |
| UK Rock & Metal Albums (OCC) | 12 |
