= Marc Rizzo =

American guitarist (born 1977)

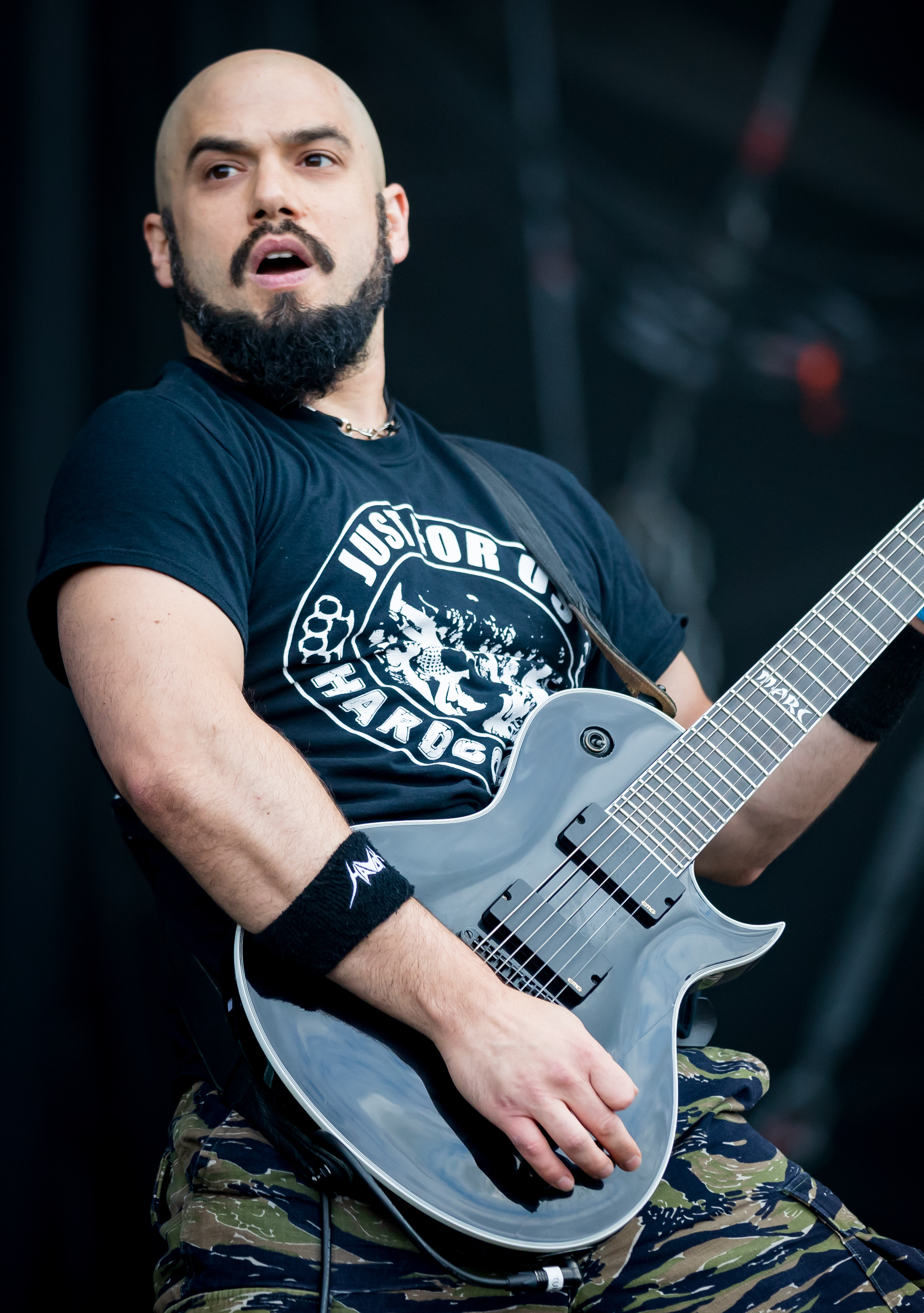
- Rizzo performing in 2017

Background information
- Born: August 2, 1977 (age 49); Carlstadt, New Jersey, U.S.
- Origin: Sussex County, New Jersey, U.S.
- Genres: Heavy metal; extreme metal
- Occupations: Musician; songwriter
- Instrument: Guitar
- Years active: 1998–present
- Member of: Merauder; Revenge Beast; Acoustic Vendetta; Faction Zero; Hail the Horns; Bleed the Fifth; The Monarch
- Formerly of: Soulfly; Cavalera Conspiracy; Ill Niño; Misfits; Marc Rizzo and the Corrupters; Coretez; Committee of Thirteen; Inpsychobleedia; Dead by Wednesday
- Website: marcrizzo.net

Marc Rizzo (born August 2, 1977) is an American musician, best known as the former lead guitarist of the metal band Soulfly. He featured on eight Soulfly albums: Prophecy, Dark Ages, Conquer, Omen, Enslaved, Savages, Archangel, and Ritual. He has also released five solo instrumental albums: Marc Rizzo, Colossal Myopia, The Ultimate Devotion, Legionnaire, and Rotation.

== Career ==
Early in his career, he was known to wear a backpack on stage during the shows.

In 2004, Rizzo created the indie Phlamencore Records with younger brother Luke. It since has released two sampler CDs and three full-lengths.

2007 saw him headline his first US tour to venues across the country. In 2008, two solo records were released under Shrapnel Records.

Rizzo is a former member of Cavalera Conspiracy, a side project with the co-founders of Sepultura, Max and Igor Cavalera. The band released their debut album Inflikted in 2008, Blunt Force Trauma in 2011 and Pandemonium in 2014.

In March 2015, it was announced that Rizzo was playing guitar for Misfits. His only show with the band took place at Dutch Comic Con.

In 2020, Rizzo started a new death metal side project, Revenge Beast.

In August 2021, Rizzo departed Soulfly after 18 years with the band. Rizzo said in an interview that he got no support from Soulfly during the COVID-19 pandemic. He went further saying "I was doing home renovations, working very hard, 10 hours a day," he explained. "A Soulfly live record came out [last year, Live Ritual NYC MMXIX]. I never saw a dime of that. So basically, within the [first] six [or] seven months of Covid, I just said, 'You know, man, I don't want this anymore. I gave you guys 18 years of my life, "And it was a great time. Back in the good years, it was great. But the last eight to 10 years have not been very good".

In October 2021, Rizzo returned to Ill Niño, where he performed as their original guitarist from 1998 until his departure in 2003. He quietly left the band in late 2024.

== Artistry ==
While primarily regarded as a metal guitarist, Rizzo's solo work demonstrates an interest in a wide range of styles, combining elements of hard rock, metal, jazz, classical and flamenco guitar.

== Equipment ==
Rizzo was endorsed by Peavey and Yamaha, and traveled the world undertaking clinics for Peavey when his tour schedule allowed. Rizzo, as of 2009, is endorsed by B.C. Rich. A signature seven-string Stealth model has been built for him and made available for to the public as an import model in 2010. He has been using PRS SE Custom 24 seven-string guitars. He currently uses a Washburn seven-string single-cut guitar.

== Personal life ==
Rizzo grew up in Carlstadt, New Jersey, where he attended Henry P. Becton Regional High School.

== Discography ==
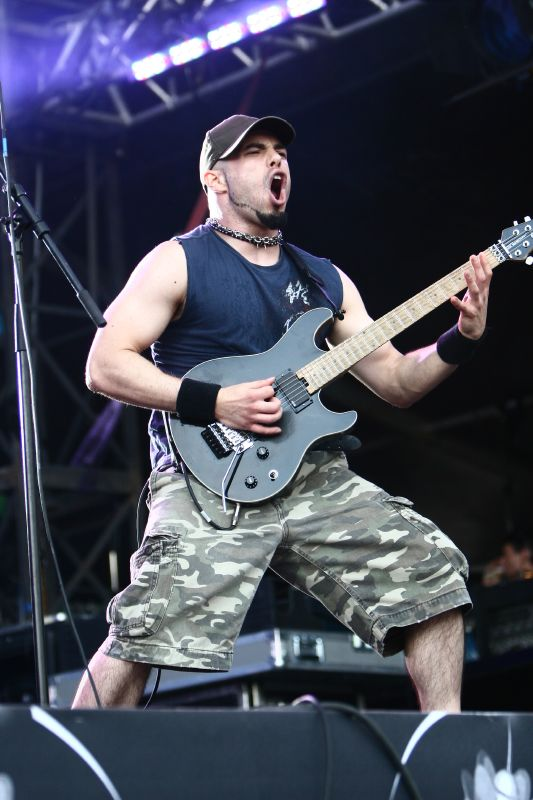
Rizzo with Cavalera Conspiracy in 2008

=== Solo ===
- Marc Rizzo (2004) (Phlamencore Records)
- Colossal Myopia (2006) (Shrapnel Records)
- The Ultimate Devotion (2007) (Shrapnel Records)
- Legionnaire (2010) (Phlamencore Records)
- Singles Collection (2015) (Phlamencore Records) (split with Inpsychobleedia)
- Rotation (2018) (Combat Records)
- Living Shred Vol. 1 (2021) (Godsize Records)

=== Cavalera Conspiracy ===
- Inflikted (2008) (Roadrunner Records)
- Blunt Force Trauma (2011) (Roadrunner Records)
- Pandemonium (2014) (Napalm Records)
- Psychosis (2017) (Napalm Records)

=== Committee of Thirteen ===
- Self Titled (2004) (Phlamencore Records)

=== Coretez ===
- Coretez EP (2003) (re-released in 2011 on iTunes through Phlamencore Records)

=== Ill Niño ===
- Ill Niño EP (2000) (C.I.A. Records)
- Revolution Revolución (2001) (Roadrunner Records)
- The Best of Ill Niño (2006) (Roadrunner Records)

=== Misfits ===
- Vampire Girl / Zombie Girl (2015) (Misfits Records)

=== Revenge Beast ===
- Revenge Beast (2021) (Phlamencore Records) (split with Inpsychobleedia)
- Revenge Beast (2023) (Upstate Records)

=== Soulfly ===
- Prophecy (2004) (Roadrunner Records)
- Dark Ages (2005) (Roadrunner Records)
- Conquer (2008) (Roadrunner Records)
- Omen (2010) (Roadrunner Records)
- Enslaved (2012) (Roadrunner Records)
- Savages (2013) (Nuclear Blast Entertainment)
- Archangel (2015) (Nuclear Blast Entertainment)
- Ritual (2018) (Nuclear Blast Entertainment)

=== The Monarch ===
- A Moment to Lose Your Breath (2023) (Art Is War/Godsize Records)

=== Instructional DVDs with Rock House ===
- Metal Guitar- Modern, Speed & Shred, level 1 & 2 (2007)

=== Guest appearances ===
- 2003 – Violent Delight – Transmission (WEA) (guitar on Shattered and All You Ever Do)
- 2007 – Divine Heresy – Bleed the Fifth (Roadrunner Records) (guitar in the intro of Rise of the Scorned)
- 2010 – Cloak Dagger – Argila (Phlamencore Records) – digital single available on iTunes
- 2011 – Benjamin Woods – Vision (Flametal Records) (guitar on Quicksilver and Pistolero)
- 2011 – Cloak Dagger – Cascañata (Phlamencore Records) – digital single available on iTunes
- 2011 – Practice To Deceive – Dysfunctional Interdependence (Self released)
- 2012 – Cloak Dagger – Ale' Sofi (Phlamencore Records) – digital single available on iTunes
- 2012 – Strife – Witness A Rebirth (6131 Records) (guitar on In This Defiance)
- 2012 – Practice To Deceive – Dysorder & Dysease (Self released)
- 2014 – Flametal – Flametal (Self released)
- 2015 – Sean Baker Orchestra – Game On!! (Shredguy Records) (guitar on Shrapnel in Your Ear)
- 2016 – Dead by Wednesday – The Darkest of Angels (EMP Label Group) (guitar on The Surgeon)
- 2016 – Pulse8 – Follow Me to Hell (lead guitar on Follow Me to Hell)
- 2022 – Claustrofobia – Unleeched (lead guitar on Corrupted Self)
- 2024 – Kaosis – We are the Future (lead guitar on Human Tumour and See! See! I Told You Baby!)
- 2025 – Branch Dividian – Division Era (guitar on In the Shadows with)
