= Dorángel Vargas =

Venezuelan serial killer

- Born: José Dorángel Vargas Gómez; May 14, 1957 (age 69); Caño Zancudo, Mérida, Venezuela
- Other name: El comegente

Details
- Victims: 14 known, suspect of many more murders
- Span of crimes: 1995–1999/2016
- Country: Venezuela
- Date apprehended: February 1999

José Dorángel Vargas Gómez (born May 14, 1957), also known as "El comegente" (lit. The people eater), is a serial killer and cannibal in Venezuela. He was a homeless man who used to hunt people at a park in the city of San Cristobal, Táchira. Once he was caught, he confessed to killing and eating at least eleven men over a period of two years preceding his arrest in 1999.

== Biography ==
Dorángel Vargas was born in 1957 to poor farmers. His priors included three arrests, two of them for minor offenses (theft of chickens and cattle). The third was acquired in 1995 when he was admitted to the Institute of Psychiatric Rehabilitation Peribeca for the murder of Baltazar Cruz Moreno, and the subsequent cannibalism of his body. He was released from the center because he made a normal impression; he then led a seemingly normal life in poverty.

It is believed that he was actively murdering men between November 1998 and January 1999. Vargas hunted victims with a tube-shaped spear and occasionally with rocks. He kept the parts that he could cook and usually buried the feet, hands and heads. It seemed that his primary targets were unsuspecting athletes and laborers working on the riverbank. He did not eat women or children, and when asked why, he explained that he felt that they were too "pure" to consume. Since he had no place to store the human flesh, most of it would decompose quickly, which made him kill routinely.

On February 12, 1999, members of the civil defense found the remains of two young people and alerted the security forces. Searching around the same area, the remains of six more bodies were found. Hypotheses about the findings included the plot being a cemetery for corpses linked to drug gangs and even a burial ground for victims of Satanic cult rituals. The victims, after further investigation, were all found to have been missing persons. As the investigation progressed, Vargas became a suspect. An inspection of the shack that he was living in near the area revealed several vessels containing human flesh and viscera prepared for consumption, along with three human heads and several feet and hands.

In 2016, Vargas was involved in a prison riot in which he apparently killed two other inmates and served their remains to other inmates.

== See also ==
- List of incidents of cannibalism
- List of serial killers by country
- List of serial killers by number of victims
