= List of Soulfly members =

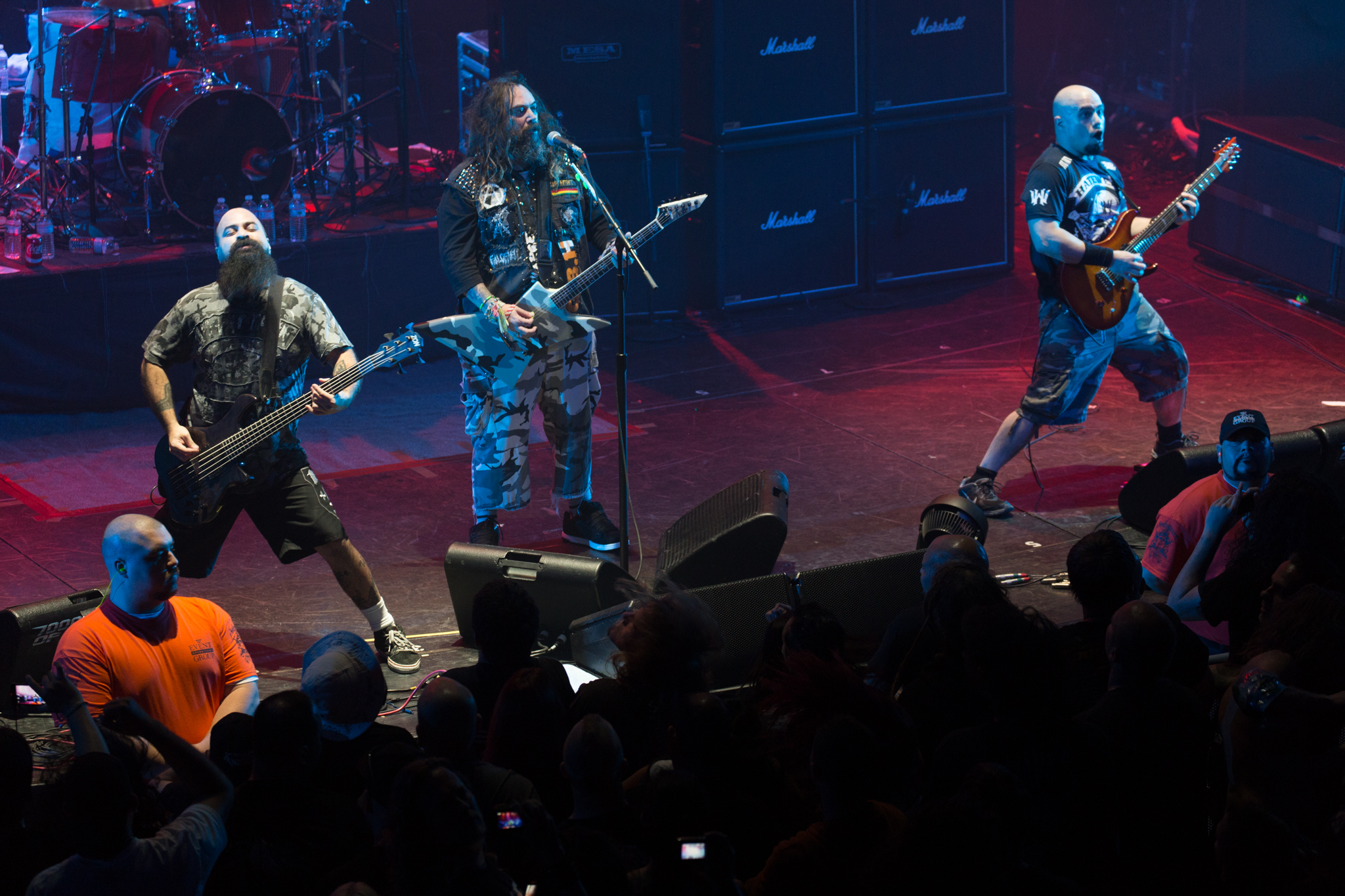
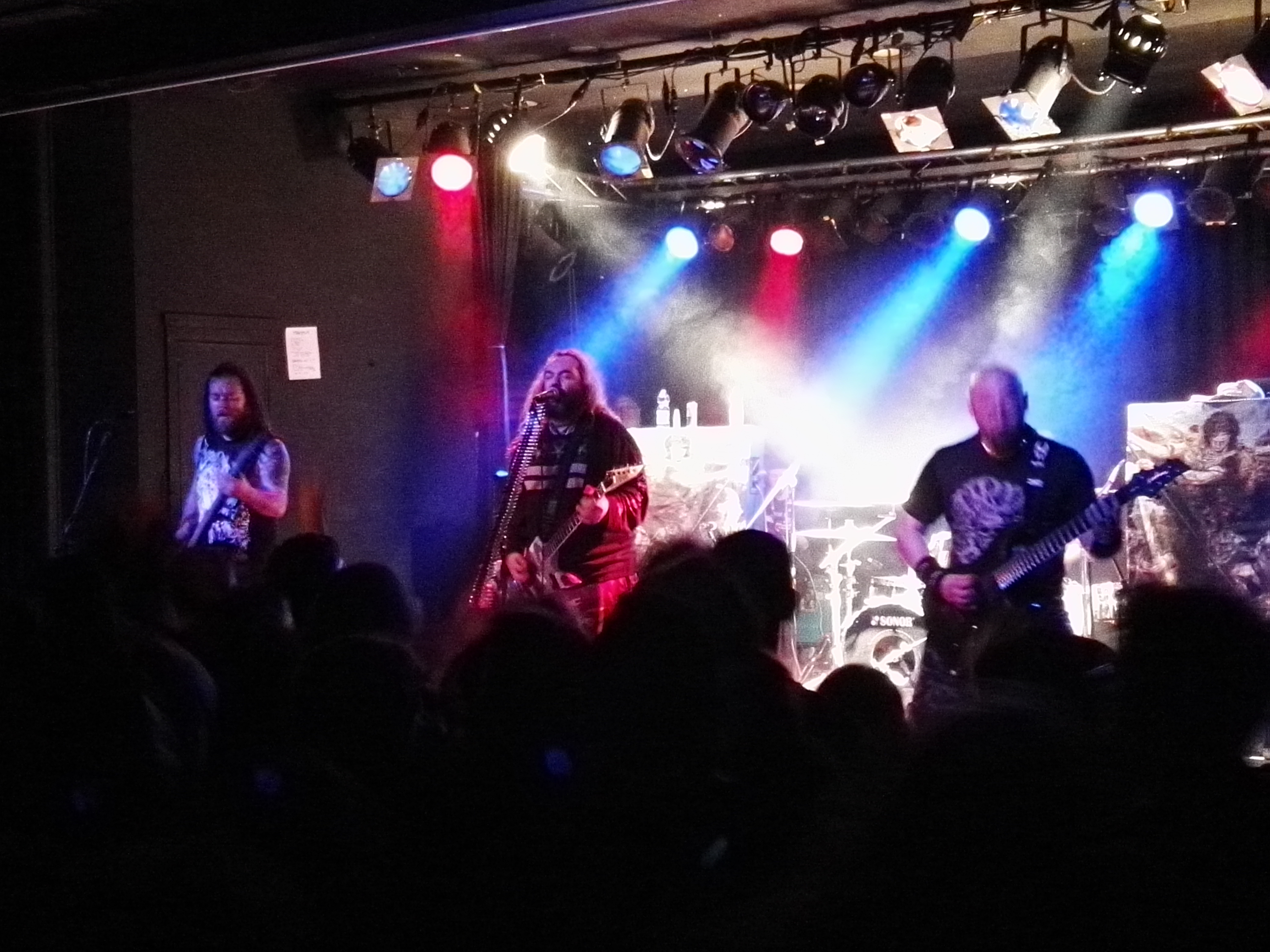
Two lineups of Soulfly performing live in 2015 (top) and 2016 (bottom).

Soulfly is an American heavy metal band from Phoenix, Arizona. Formed by vocalist and rhythm guitarist Max Cavalera following his departure from Sepultura in 1997, the group originally included lead guitarist Jackson Bandeira, bassist Marcelo "Cello" Dias and drummer Roy "Rata" Mayorga. Bandeira left after the recording of the band's self-titled debut album, with former Machine Head guitarist Logan Mader taking his place in April 1998 for the album's touring cycle. Mader had left by the following January, with Mikey Doling joining in his place. Mayorga departed the group in July 1999, with Joe Nunez announced as his replacement in November. Nunez performed on the 2000 album Primitive, but left the following October due to concerns with his "financial arrangement with the group". Mayorga returned in his place.

In September 2003, Dias was fired from Soulfly by Cavalera and his wife Gloria (the band's manager), which prompted Doling and Mayorga to leave. The departed members were quickly replaced by returning drummer Nunez, Primer 55 guitarist Bobby Burns on bass, and former Ill Niño guitarist Marc Rizzo. The group's lineup subsequently remained stable for a number of years, before Burns left in July 2010, shortly after the release of Omen. Fireball Ministry's Johny Chow filled in for a string of tour dates, before Tony Campos (formerly of Static-X) joined as Burns' full-time replacement in 2011. Shortly after Campos' addition, Nunez left Soulfly and was replaced temporarily by Cavalera's son Zyon. Borknagar's David Kinkade subsequently joined in September, performing on the group's eighth studio album Enslaved.

Kinkade played his final show with Soulfly on October 23, 2012, when he decided to retire from music. Zyon Cavalera subsequently returned to the band in Kinkade's place. In May 2015, Campos left Soulfly to join Fear Factory, with Havok's Mike Leon taking over a few months later. In August 2021, it was announced lead guitarist Marc Rizzo had left the band, and that his replacement on the 2021 North American tour would be Dino Cazares of Fear Factory, Cazares continued to tour with the band into 2022. On January 5, 2023, the band announced Mike DeLeon of Philip H. Anselmo & The Illegals as the band's new touring guitarist. It was later revealed that other guitarists were also planned to cover many of the tour dates for 2023, although DeLeon has stayed with the band since.

In April 2025, the band parted ways with Mike Leon, Igor Cavalera Jr. was announced as his touring replacement at the same time. The next month Chase Bryant of Warbringer was announced to be touring with the band.

== Members ==
=== Current ===
Image	Name	Years active	Instruments	Release contributions
	Max Cavalera	1997–present	lead vocals; rhythm guitar; sitar; berimbau; bass (2025–present)	all releases
	Zyon Cavalera	2011 (touring); 2012–present	drums; percussion	all releases from Enslaved (2012) – one track only onwards
	Mike DeLeon	2025–present (touring 2023–2025)	lead guitar; backing vocals (2025–present)	Chama (2025)

=== Former ===
Image	Name	Years active	Instruments	Release contributions
	Marcelo "Cello" Dias (Marcello D. Rapp)	1997–2003	bass; backing vocals; percussion	Soulfly (1998); Tribe (1999); Primitive (2000); 3 (2002); The Song Remains Insane (2005) – two tracks only
	Roy "Mata" Mayorga	1997–1999; 2001–2003	drums; percussion; backing vocals	Soulfly (1998); Tribe (1999); 3 (2002)
	Jackson Bandeira (Lúcio Maia)	1997–1998	lead guitar; backing vocals	Soulfly (1998)
	Logan Mader	1998–1999	lead guitar; backing vocals	Tribe (1999)
	Mikey Doling	1999–2003	lead guitar; percussion; backing vocals	Primitive (2000); 3 (2002); The Song Remains Insane (2005) – two tracks only
	Joe Nunez	1999–2001; 2003–2011	drums; percussion	Primitive (2000) and all Soulfly releases from Prophecy (2004) to Omen (2010)
	Marc Rizzo	2003–2021	lead guitar; flamenco guitar	all Soulfly releases from Prophecy (2004) to Ritual (2018)
	Bobby Burns	2003–2010	bass; backing vocals	all Soulfly releases from Prophecy (2004) to Omen (2010)
	Tony Campos	2011–2015	bass; backing vocals	Enslaved (2012); Savages (2013); Archangel (2015)
	David Kinkade	2011–2012	drums; percussion	Enslaved (2012)
	Mike Leon	2015–2025	bass; backing vocals	all releases from Ritual (2018) onwards

=== Touring ===
Image	Name	Years active	Instruments	Notes
	Jason Roeder	1999	drums	Roeder performed drums after the departure of Roy Mayorga on the Bring da Shit to North America tour.
	Dave Chavarri	1999	drums	Chavarri performed drums after the departure of Roy Mayorga and before Joe Nunez joined the band.
	David Ellefson	2003; 2005; 2006	bass	Ellefson substituted for Bobby Burns in Soulfly several times, as well as performing on Prophecy.
	Dan Lilker	2006	bass	Lilker filled in for Bobby Burns in late 2006, when the regular bassist was recovering from a stroke.
	Johny Chow	2010–2011	bass	Chow performed with Soulfly after the departure of Bobby Burns in 2010 until Tony Campos joined in 2011.
	Kanky Lora	2013; 2014; 2015; 2016	drums	Lora has substituted for Zyon Cavalera on several tours between 2013 and 2016.
	Igor Amadeus Cavalera	2015; 2017–2018; 2025	bass and backing vocals (2015, 2025); keyboards, samples and co-lead vocals (2017–18)	Following the departure of Tony Campos, Cavalera played bass on a UK tour in 2015. He later contributed keyboards and co-lead vocals during a North American tour in 2017 and 2018 on which the band performed Nailbomb's Point Blank in full. He has also filled in on bass after Mike Leon's departure in 2025.
	Dino Cazares	2021–2022	lead guitar; backing vocals	Cazares joined the band in August 2021 after the rumored departure of Marc Rizzo. Cazares had previously made guest live appearances during the Soulfly touring cycle.
	Chase Bryant	2025–present	bass	Bryant is playing bass on the band's Spring tour.

== Lineups ==
Period	Members	Releases
1997 – April 1998	Max Cavalera – lead vocals, rhythm guitar, sitar, berimbau; Cello Dias – bass, percussion, backing vocals; Roy Mayorga – drums, percussion, backing vocals; Jackson Bandeira – lead guitar, backing vocals	Soulfly (1998); Tribe (1999) three tracks
April 1998 – January 1999	Max Cavalera – lead vocals, rhythm guitar, sitar, berimbau; Cello Dias – bass, percussion, backing vocals; Roy Mayorga – drums, percussion, backing vocals; Logan Mader – lead guitar, backing vocals	Tribe (1999)
January – July 1999	Max Cavalera – lead vocals, rhythm guitar, sitar, berimbau; Cello Dias – bass, percussion, backing vocals; Roy Mayorga – drums, percussion, backing vocals; Mikey Doling – lead guitar, backing vocals	none
July – November 1999	Max Cavalera – lead vocals, rhythm guitar, sitar, berimbau; Cello Dias – bass, percussion, backing vocals; Mikey Doling – lead guitar, backing vocals; Dave Chavarri – drums (touring)	none
November 1999 – October 2001	Max Cavalera – lead vocals, rhythm guitar, sitar, berimbau; Cello Dias – bass, percussion, backing vocals; Mikey Doling – lead guitar, backing vocals; Joe Nunez – drums, percussion	Primitive (2000); The Song Remains Insane (2005) – two tracks
October 2001 – September 2003	Max Cavalera – lead vocals, rhythm guitar, sitar, berimbau; Cello Dias – bass, percussion, backing vocals; Mikey Doling – lead guitar, percussion, backing vocals; Roy Mayorga – drums, percussion, backing vocals	3 (2002)
September 2003 – July 2010	Max Cavalera – lead vocals, rhythm guitar, sitar, berimbau; Joe Nunez – drums, percussion; Bobby Burns – bass, backing vocals; Marc Rizzo – lead guitar	Prophecy (2004); Dark Ages (2005); The Song Remains Insane (2005); Conquer (2008); Omen (2010)
July 2010 – June 2011	Max Cavalera – lead vocals, rhythm guitar, sitar, berimbau; Joe Nunez – drums, percussion; Marc Rizzo – lead guitar; Johny Chow – bass (touring)	none
June – July 2011	Max Cavalera – lead vocals, rhythm guitar, sitar, berimbau; Joe Nunez – drums, percussion; Marc Rizzo – lead guitar; Tony Campos – bass, backing vocals	none
July – September 2011	Max Cavalera – lead vocals, rhythm guitar, sitar, berimbau; Marc Rizzo – lead guitar; Tony Campos – bass, backing vocals; Zyon Cavalera – drums, percussion (touring)	none
September 2011 – October 2012	Max Cavalera – lead vocals, rhythm guitar, sitar, berimbau; Marc Rizzo – lead guitar; Tony Campos – bass, backing vocals; David Kinkade – drums, percussion	Enslaved (2012)
November 2012 – May 2015	Max Cavalera – lead vocals, rhythm guitar, sitar, berimbau; Marc Rizzo – lead and flamenco guitars; Tony Campos – bass, backing vocals; Zyon Cavalera – drums, percussion	Savages (2013); Archangel (2015)
May – September 2015	Max Cavalera – lead vocals, rhythm guitar, sitar, berimbau; Marc Rizzo – lead guitar; Zyon Cavalera – drums, percussion; Igor Amadeus Cavalera – bass, backing vocals (touring)	none
September 2015 – August 2021	Max Cavalera – lead vocals, rhythm guitar, sitar, berimbau; Marc Rizzo – lead guitar; Zyon Cavalera – drums, percussion; Mike Leon – bass, backing vocals	Ritual (2018)
August 2021 – January 2023	Max Cavalera – lead vocals, rhythm guitar, sitar, berimbau; Zyon Cavalera – drums, percussion; Mike Leon – bass, backing vocals; Dino Cazares – lead guitar, backing vocals (touring)	Totem (2022)
January 2023 – April 2025	Max Cavalera – lead vocals, rhythm guitar, sitar, berimbau; Zyon Cavalera – drums, percussion; Mike Leon – bass, backing vocals; Mike DeLeon – lead guitar (touring)	none
April 2025 – present	Max Cavalera – lead vocals, rhythm guitar, sitar, berimbau; Zyon Cavalera – drums, percussion; Mike DeLeon – lead guitar, backing vocals; Igor Amadeus Cavalera – bass, backing vocals (touring)	Chama (2025)
