= Soulfly discography =

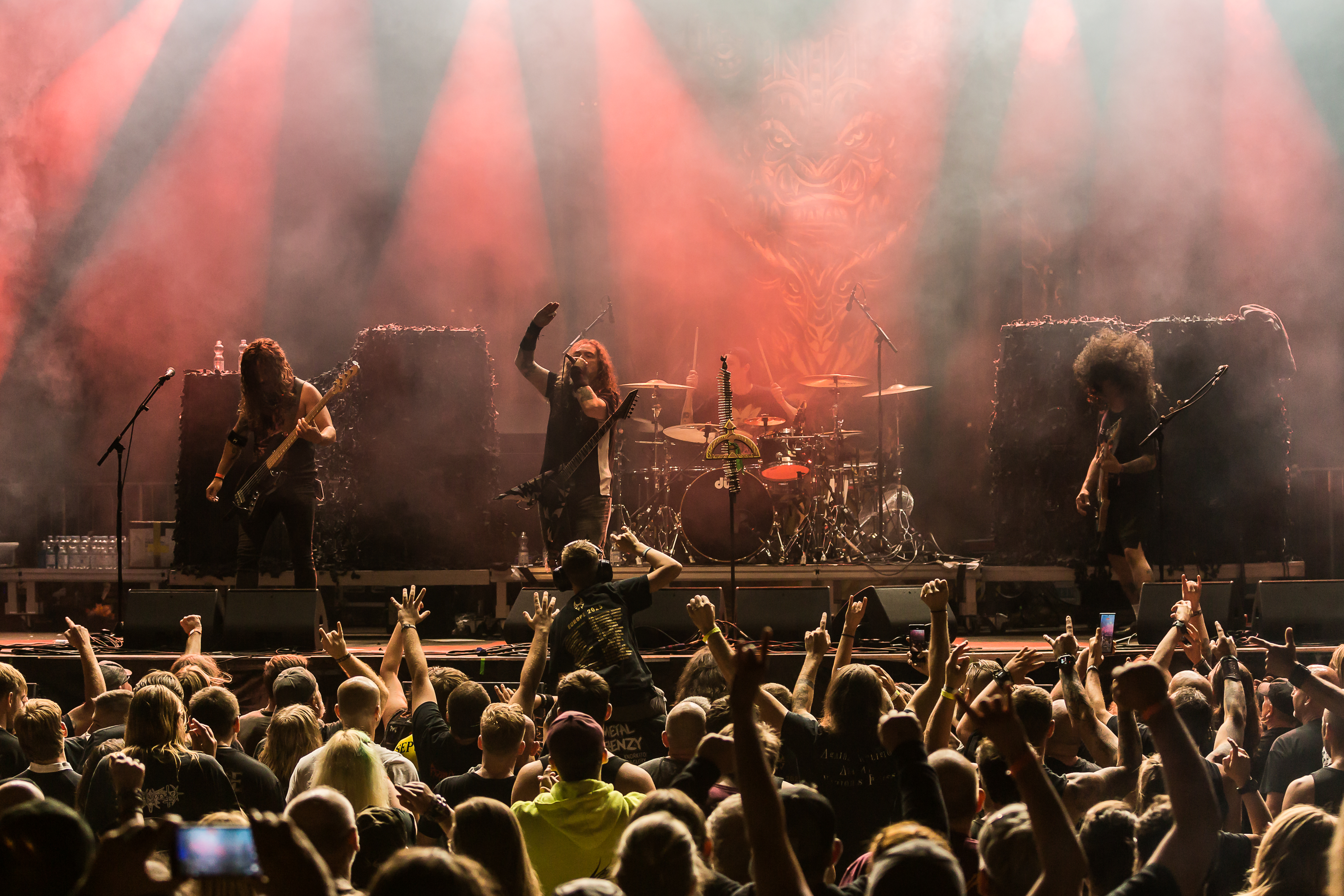
- Soulfly performing in 2025
- Studio albums: 13
- Extended plays: 3
- Live albums: 1
- Compilation albums: 2
- Singles: 29
- Video albums: 1
- Music videos: 18

The following is the discography of Soulfly, an American heavy metal band formed in 1997 by Max Cavalera after leaving Sepultura. The band's original lyrical content revolved around spirituality, political and religious themes, with later albums encompassing other themes including war, violence, aggression, slavery, hatred and anger. Soulfly incorporates many styles of metal with Brazilian tribal and world music. All of their first six studio albums debuted on the United States Billboard 200, with a peak position at number 32 for their second album, Primitive. Soulfly has been certified gold by the Recording Industry Association of America. The band has gone through numerous line-up changes, with Cavalera being the only constant member. To date the band has released thirteen studio albums, one tour EP, twenty-six singles, one video album, and seventeen music videos. Their debut album, Soulfly, was released on April 21, 1998, while their newest album, Totem, was released on August 5, 2022.

== Albums ==
=== Studio albums ===
| Title | Album details | Peak chart positions | | | | | | | | | | Certifications |
| Title | Album details | US | AUS | AUT | BEL | FIN | FRA | GER | NLD | SWI | UK | Certifications |
|---|---|---|---|---|---|---|---|---|---|---|---|---|
| Soulfly | Released: April 21, 1998; Label: Roadrunner (#8748); Format: CD, CS, LP, DL | 79 | 33 | 28 | 12 | 18 | 14 | 29 | 27 | — | 16 | RIAA: Gold; ARIA: Gold; BPI: Silver |
| Primitive | Released: September 26, 2000; Label: Roadrunner (#8565); Format: CD, CS, LP, DL | 32 | 26 | 28 | 20 | 22 | 20 | 16 | 39 | 76 | 45 | |
| 3 | Released: June 25, 2002; Label: Roadrunner (#8455); Format: CD, CS, LP, DL | 46 | 24 | 12 | 27 | — | 28 | 14 | 44 | 43 | 61 | |
| Prophecy | Released: March 30, 2004; Label: Roadrunner (#8304); Format: CD, CS, LP, DL | 82 | 49 | 15 | 53 | — | 38 | 24 | 51 | 39 | 103 | |
| Dark Ages | Released: October 4, 2005; Label: Roadrunner (#8191); Format: CD, CS, LP, DL | 155 | 41 | 19 | 64 | — | 49 | 29 | 68 | 44 | 126 | |
| Conquer | Released: July 29, 2008; Label: Roadrunner (#7942); Format: CD, LP, DL | 66 | 19 | 16 | 17 | 20 | 39 | 15 | 33 | 19 | 64 | |
| Omen | Released: May 25, 2010; Label: Roadrunner; Format: CD, DL | 73 | 38 | 19 | 50 | 44 | 58 | 13 | 42 | 15 | 100 | |
| Enslaved | Released: March 13, 2012; Label: Roadrunner; Format: CD, LP, DL | 82 | 42 | 32 | 59 | — | 98 | 38 | 66 | 36 | 104 | |
| Savages | Released: October 1, 2013; Label: Nuclear Blast; Format: CD, LP, DL | 84 | 68 | 43 | 83 | 39 | 91 | 41 | — | 48 | 118 | |
| Archangel | Released: August 14, 2015; Label: Nuclear Blast; Format: CD, LP, DL | 130 | 41 | 31 | 28 | 22 | 66 | 19 | 33 | 11 | 57 | |
| Ritual | Released: October 19, 2018; Label: Nuclear Blast; Format: CD, CS, LP, DL | — | — | 27 | 47 | — | 125 | 27 | 147 | 19 | 22 | |
| Totem | Released: August 5, 2022; Label: Nuclear Blast; Format: CD, CS, LP, DL | — | 19 | 25 | 187 | — | 114 | 17 | — | 21 | 77 | |
| Chama | Released: October 24, 2025; Label: Nuclear Blast; Format: CD, CS, LP, DL | — | — | 23 | 183 | — | — | 48 | — | 31 | 45 | |
"—" denotes releases that did not chart or were not released in that country.

=== Live albums ===
| Title | Album details |
|---|---|
| Live at Dynamo Open Air 1998 | Released: June 22, 2018; Label: Dynamo Concerts, F.R.E.T. Music; Format: CD, LP, DL |

=== Compilation albums ===
| Title | Album details |
|---|---|
| The Complete Roadrunner Albums | Released: September 27, 2019; Label: Warner Music; Format: DL |
| The Soul Remains Insane | Released: June 17, 2022; Label: BMG; Format: CD, LP |

=== Video albums ===
| Title | Album details | Peak chart positions | |
| Title | Album details | US | AUT |
|---|---|---|---|
| The Song Remains Insane | Released: March 1, 2005; Label: Roadrunner (#610970); Format: DVD | 15 | 5 |

== EPs ==
| Title | EP details | Peak chart positions | |
| Title | EP details | AUS | UK |
|---|---|---|---|
| Tribe | Released: January 21, 1999; Label: Roadrunner (#2203); Format: CD | 55 | 85 |
| Blood Fire War Hate Digital Tour EP | Released: May 20, 2008; Label: Roadrunner; Format: DL | — | — |
| Live Ritual NYC MMXIX | Released: May 22, 2020; Label: Nuclear Blast; Format: DL | — | — |

== Singles ==
List of singles, with selected chart positions, showing year released and album name
| Title | Year | Peak chart positions | | Album |
| Title | Year | FIN | UK | Album |
|---|---|---|---|---|
| "Eye for an Eye" (featuring Dino Cazares and Burton C. Bell) | 1998 | — | — | Soulfly |
| "Umbabarauma" | 1998 | — | 94 | Soulfly |
| "Bleed" (featuring Fred Durst & DJ Lethal) | 1998 | 8 | 88 | Soulfly |
| "Tribe" | 1999 | — | 78 | Soulfly |
| "Back to the Primitive" | 2000 | — | 120 | Primitive |
| "Son Song" (featuring Sean Lennon) | 2001 | — | — | Primitive |
| "Jumpdafuckup" (featuring Corey Taylor) | 2001 | — | — | Primitive |
| "Downstroy" | 2002 | — | — | 3 |
| "Seek 'n' Strike" | 2002 | — | — | 3 |
| "Prophecy" | 2004 | — | — | Prophecy |
| "Carved Inside" | 2005 | — | — | Dark Ages |
| "Frontlines" | 2006 | — | — | Dark Ages |
| "Unleash" (featuring Dave Peters) | 2008 | — | — | Conquer |
| "Blood Fire War Hate" (featuring David Vincent) | 2009 | — | — | Conquer |
| "Rise of the Fallen" (featuring Greg Puciato) | 2010 | — | — | Omen |
| "World Scum" (featuring Travis Ryan) | 2012 | — | — | Enslaved |
| "Bloodshed" (featuring Igor Cavalera Jr.) | 2013 | — | — | Savages |
| "Master of Savagery" | 2013 | — | — | Savages |
| "Ayatollah of Rock 'n' Rolla" (featuring Neil Fallon) | 2014 | — | — | Savages |
| "We Sold Our Souls to Metal" | 2015 | — | — | Archangel |
| "Sodomites" (featuring Todd Jones) | 2015 | — | — | Archangel |
| "Archangel" | 2015 | — | — | Archangel |
| "No Hope = No Fear" | 2018 | — | — | Live at Dynamo Open Air 1998 |
| "Evil Empowered" | 2018 | — | — | Ritual |
| "Ritual" | 2018 | — | — | Ritual |
| "Dead Behind the Eyes" (featuring Randy Blythe) | 2018 | — | — | Ritual |
| "Superstition" | 2022 | — | — | Totem |
| "Scouring the Vile" (featuring John Tardy) | 2022 | — | — | Totem |
| "Filth Upon Filth" | 2022 | — | — | Totem |
| "Storm the Gates" | 2025 | — | — | Chama |
"—" denotes releases that did not chart.

== Music videos ==
| Year | Song | Album | Director |
|---|---|---|---|
| 1998 | "Bleed" | Soulfly | Thomas Mignone |
| 2000 | "Back to the Primitive" | Primitive | Thomas Mignone |
| 2002 | "Seek 'n' Strike" | 3 | Christoffer Salzgeber |
| 2004 | "Prophecy" | Prophecy | The Good Guys Company |
| 2005 | "Carved Inside" | Dark Ages | Milos Djukelic |
| 2005 | "Frontlines" | Dark Ages | Milos Djukelic |
| 2006 | "Innerspirit" | Dark Ages | Tomasz Dziubinski |
| 2008 | "Unleash" | Conquer | Robert Sexton |
| 2010 | "Rise of the Fallen" | Omen | Dale Resteghini |
| 2012 | "World Scum" | Enslaved | Thomas Mignone |
| 2013 | "Bloodshed" | Savages | Dale Resteghini |
| 2015 | "Archangel" | Archangel | Robert Sexton |
| 2020 | "The Summoning (Live)" | Live Ritual NYC MMXIX | |
| 2020 | "Under Rapture (Live)" | Live Ritual NYC MMXIX | |
| 2022 | "Filth Upon Filth" | Totem | Costin Chioreanu |
| 2023 | "Superstition (Live)" | Totem | Costin Chioreanu |
| 2025 | "Nihilist" | Chama | Costin Chioreanu |
| 2025 | "No Pain = No Power" | Chama | Zyon Cavalera |
