= Omen (Soulfly album) =

Studio album by Soulfly
- Released: May 18, 2010
- Recorded: November 2009
- Studio: Edge of the Earth Studios (Los Angeles, California)
- Genre: Thrash metal
- Length: 40:35 (regular edition); 51:39 (special edition)
- Label: Roadrunner
- Producers: Max Cavalera; Logan Mader

Soulfly chronology
Conquer (2008)	Omen (2010)	Enslaved (2012)

Singles from Omen
- 1. "Rise of the Fallen" Released: April 20, 2010

Alternative cover
- Special edition cover

Omen is the seventh studio album by American heavy metal band Soulfly. It was recorded in November 2009 and was released first in Japan on May 18, 2010, and on May 25, 2010, in other parts of the world. It was released on May 24, 2010, in parts of Europe. It is the last album to feature bassist Bobby Burns and drummer Joe Nuñez, who were replaced by Asesino frontman Tony Campos and former Borknagar drummer David Kinkade in mid-2011. At just over forty and a half minutes, it is the band's third shortest album; the shortest is Chama at thirty-two and a half minutes.

== Background ==
Soulfly entered the Edge of the Earth Studios in Los Angeles, California on November 6, 2009, to begin recording their seventh album with Max Cavalera and Logan Mader both producing. Through a series of streaming web video updates, frontman Max Cavalera revealed on November 13, 2009, that the album would be called Omen and would feature guest appearances by Tommy Victor of Prong and Greg Puciato of The Dillinger Escape Plan. Additionally, the album features performances on drums from Max's first son Zyon Cavalera on a b-side cover of Sepultura's "Refuse-Resist" and his youngest son Igor Cavalera Jr. on a cover of Excel's "Your Life, My Life".

The seven figures in album art of Omen (on the standard edition three figures are on the cover, and four are on the back), created by David Ho, are meant to represent that this is Soulfly's seventh studio album. Each of the seven figures, inspired by the fictional Star Wars creatures the Tusken Raiders, were also meant to represent each of the seven deadly sins from what they hold in their hands. In fact, Cavalera saw Ho's stylized depiction of Tusken Raiders created for LucasArts and requested an album cover similar in style.

== Reception ==
Professional ratings
Review scores
Source	Rating
About.com	4/5 stars
AllMusic	4/5 stars
Blabbermouth	7.5/10 stars
Metal Hammer	7/10
PopMatters	5/10 stars
Record Collector	3/5 stars
Rock Sound	8/10 stars
Sputnikmusic	3.5/5 stars
Ultimate Guitar	7.5/10 stars

Jay H. Gorania of About.com praised the album, "it is brutal and fast, though not necessarily as intense or interesting as the releases marking Cavalera's early and mid-period work. Yet this is a transition from what has become a mediocre band to one that sounds vital and refreshing." Gregory Heaney of AllMusic said "Omen is like thrash metal comfort food." PopMatters rated this album 5 out of 10 stars, saying "Cavalera sounds more focused than usual, his lyrics are more angry than spiritual, the band leans more towards thrash than nu-metal, and the production keeps things rather simple, clean and loud as all mainstream metal, but always emphasizing the physicality of the rhythm riffing." Sputnikmusic thought this album is great, because it "exhibits the same rough formula but unlike other Soulfly albums these tracks display a higher level of writing style, musical ability and a better use of creative ideas in a more mature and cohesive manner."

== Track Listing ==
"Rise of the Fallen" features Static-X-like riff with cyber tones, then a sitar signals the beginning of death metal riff. The song features Greg Puciato of The Dillinger Escape Plan. "Great Depression" plays such thrashy riff that it sounded like train derailing, before abruptly settling down into Hellhammer-like riff for chorus. "Kingdom" is a unique song for Soulfly due to melodic vocals by Max Cavalera. "Vulture Culture" is a rhyming song title that has hints of Nailbomb sounds and punky riffs.

=== Track listing ===
All lyrics and music are written by Max Cavalera, except where noted.

No.	Title	Lyrics	Length
1.	"Bloodbath & Beyond"		2:31
2.	"Rise of the Fallen" (featuring Greg Puciato of The Dillinger Escape Plan)	M. Cavalera; Greg Puciato	4:35
3.	"Great Depression"		3:57
4.	"Lethal Injection" (featuring Tommy Victor of Prong)	M. Cavalera; Tommy Victor	3:05
5.	"Kingdom"		3:55
6.	"Jeffrey Dahmer"		2:52
7.	"Off with Their Heads"		4:22
8.	"Vulture Culture"		4:01
9.	"Mega-Doom"		3:04
10.	"Counter Sabotage"		3:50
11.	"Soulfly VII" (instrumental)		4:23
Total length:			40:35

Deluxe edition bonus tracks
No.	Title	Lyrics	Music	Length
12.	"Four Sticks" (Led Zeppelin cover)	Jimmy Page; Robert Plant	Page; Plant	4:40
13.	"Refuse/Resist" (Sepultura cover)		M. Cavalera; Andreas Kisser; Paulo Pinto Jr.; Igor Cavalera	3:10
14.	"Your Life, My Life" (Excel cover)	Dan Clements	Adam Siegel; Shaun Ross	3:14
Total length:				51:39

Deluxe edition DVD: Live at the With Full Force Festival, Germany – July 3, 2009
No.	Title	Lyrics	Music	Length
1.	"Blood Fire War Hate"	M. Cavalera; David Vincent
2.	"Sanctuary" (Cavalera Conspiracy cover)
3.	"Prophecy"
4.	"Back to the Primitive"
5.	"Seek 'N' Strike"
6.	"Living Sacrifice"
7.	"Enemy Ghost"
8.	"Refuse/Resist" (Sepultura cover)		M. Cavalera; Kisser; Pinto Jr.; I. Cavalera
9.	"Doom"
10.	"L.O.T.M."
11.	"Molotov"	M. Cavalera; Paul Fillipenko; Billy Milano
12.	"Drums"
13.	"Warmageddon"
14.	"Polícia" (Titãs/Sepultura cover)	Tony Bellotto	Bellotto
15.	"Unleash"	M. Cavalera; Dave Peters
16.	"Roots Bloody Roots" (Sepultura cover)		M. Cavalera; Kisser; Pinto Jr.; I. Cavalera
17.	"Jumpdafuckup"	M. Cavalera; Corey Taylor
18.	"Eye for an Eye"
19.	"Unleash" (music video)	M. Cavalera; Peters

== Personnel ==
=== Soulfly ===
- Max Cavalera – vocals, four-string guitar, sitar
- Marc Rizzo – lead guitar, flamenco guitar
- Bobby Burns – bass
- Joe Nunez – drums, percussion

=== Additional personnel ===
- Branden Krull – keyboards
- Greg Puciato – vocals on "Rise of the Fallen"
- Tommy Victor – vocals on "Lethal Injection"
- Zyon Cavalera – drums on "Refuse/Resist"
- Igor Cavalera – drums on "Your Life, My Life"

=== Production ===
- Logan Mader – producer, engineering, mixing, mastering

== Chart performance ==
Chart (2010)	Peak position
Australian Albums (ARIA)	38
Austrian Albums (Ö3 Austria)	19
Belgian Albums (Ultratop Flanders)	50
Belgian Albums (Ultratop Wallonia)	73
Dutch Albums (Album Top 100)	42
Finnish Albums (Suomen virallinen lista)	44
French Albums (SNEP)	58
German Albums (Offizielle Top 100)	13
Greek Albums (IFPI)	1
New Zealand Albums (RMNZ)	30
Swiss Albums (Schweizer Hitparade)	15
UK Albums (OCC)	100
US Billboard 200	73

== See also ==
- Bed Bath & Beyond, the store punned by Bloodbath & Beyond
- "The Cartridge Family", a Simpsons episode that uses the name "Bloodbath and Beyond" for a fictional store
