= Zyon Cavalera =

American drummer (born 1993)

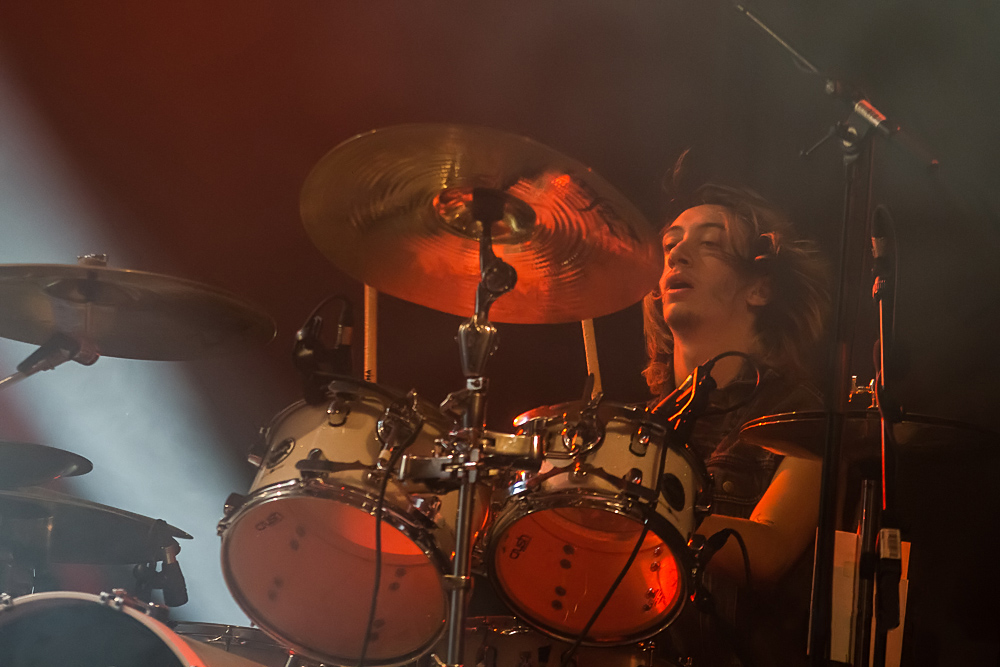
- Cavalera with Soulfly in 2013

Background information
- Born: January 19, 1993 (age 32); Phoenix, Arizona, U.S.
- Genres: Groove metal; thrash metal; death metal; alternative metal; hardcore punk; sludge metal
- Occupation: Drummer
- Years active: 2010–present
- Member of: Soulfly
- Formerly of: Lody Kong; Mold Breaker

Zyon Cavalera (born January 19, 1993) is an American musician who is the current drummer for metal bands Soulfly and Lody Kong. He is the son of ex-Sepultura and current Soulfly frontman Max Cavalera.

== Biography ==
Zyon Cavalera was born on January 19, 1993. His father Max added his in utero heartbeat into the beginning of the 1993 Sepultura song "Refuse/Resist" from their album Chaos A.D.. Having grown up learning from the likes of uncle Igor Cavalera, ex-Soulfly drummer Roy Mayorga and Black Sabbath drummer Bill Ward, in 2010 he played drums on a cover of Refuse/Resist by Soulfly, as a bonus track for the band's seventh album Omen, and in 2012 he played drums on the track "Revengeance" on Enslaved along with brothers Richie and Igor.

In 2011, Cavalera formed the band Lody Kong, with his brother Igor Jr. fronting the band (the two are also involved in Mold Breaker, formed in 2010). Lody Kong has toured worldwide in the "Maximum Cavalera Tour" with Soulfly and Incite, fronted by half brother Richie. During this tour towards the end of 2012, Soulfly parted ways with the retiring David Kinkade, with Cavalera replacing him. In February 2013, Lody Kong released their debut EP, No Rules, produced by Roy Mayorga with art by Sergio Zuniga. A music video was released on May 21, 2013, for "mOnkeys alWays Look." In 2013, it was confirmed that Cavalera would be performing in a full-time capacity on Soulfly's 9th album, Savages.

March 25, 2016, marks Lody Kong's first full-length debut album, Dreams And Visions, distributed by Mascot Label Group and produced by John Gray (Soulfly, Cavalera Conspiracy) with Sergio Zuniga returning to create all the artwork for the album.

== Discography ==
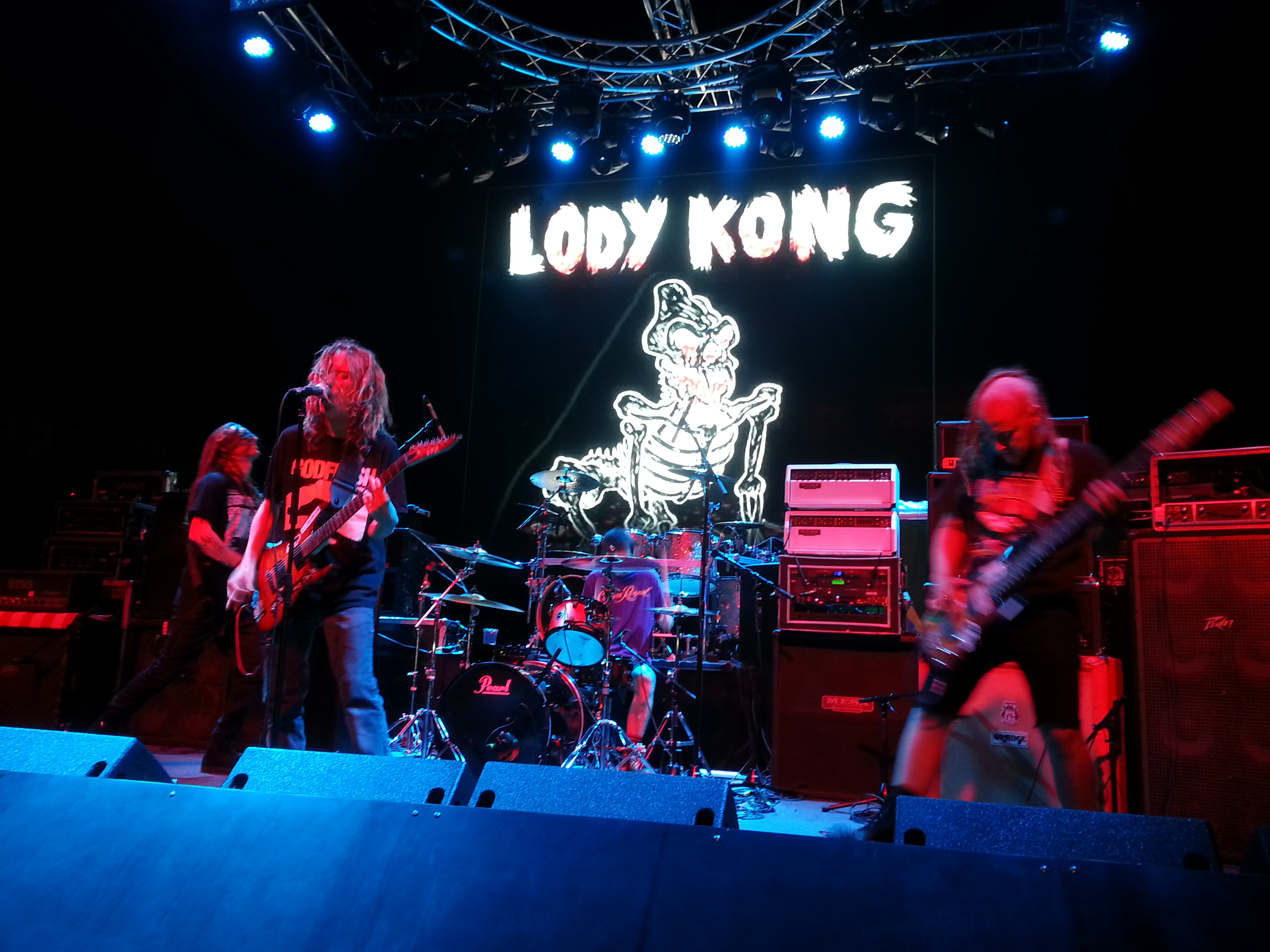
Zyon Cavalera performing with Lody Kong

=== With Lody Kong ===
- Bird EP (2012)
- No Rules EP (2013)
- Dreams And Visions (2016)

=== With Soulfly ===
- Soulfly (1998) – voice on "Bumbklaatt"
- Primitive (2000) – foosball sampler on "Mulambo"
- 3 (2002) – voices on "One Nation"
- Omen (2010) – drums on "Refuse/Resist"
- Enslaved (2012) – drums on "Revengeance"
- Savages (2013) – drums, percussion
- Archangel (2015) – drums, percussion
- Ritual (2018) - drums, percussion
- Totem (2022) - drums, percussion

=== With Sepultura ===
- Chaos A.D. (1993) – heartbeat on "Refuse/Resist"
