= Ritual (Soulfly album) =

Studio album by Soulfly
- Released: October 19, 2018
- Recorded: January–June 2018
- Studio: Hybrid Studios; (Santa Ana, California)
- Genre: Thrash metal; groove metal; death metal
- Length: 43:13
- Label: Nuclear Blast
- Producer: Josh Wilbur

Soulfly chronology
Archangel (2015)	Ritual (2018)	Totem (2022)

Singles from Ritual
- 1. "Evil Empowered" Released: August 9, 2018; 2. "Ritual" Released: August 31, 2018; 3. "Dead Behind the Eyes" Released: September 14, 2018; 4. "Under Rapture" Released: October 19, 2018

Ritual is the eleventh studio album by American heavy metal band Soulfly, released on October 19, 2018, through Nuclear Blast. It is the third Soulfly album with Max Cavalera's son Zyon on drums and the last to feature lead guitarist Marc Rizzo. It features musical guests Randy Blythe of Lamb of God, Ross Dolan of Immolation, and Mark Damon of The Pretty Reckless. Four singles were released from the album—"Evil Empowered", title track "Ritual", "Dead Behind the Eyes", and "Under Rapture".

The album was produced by Josh Wilbur. Max Cavalera stated "For this one, we really tried to retain the groove of early Soulfly as well as my love for the heavy, fast stuff I'm into: like death and black metal and some hardcore. Working with Josh Wilbur for Soulfly this time around has been amazing. He's a huge fan and added a lot to the record. I would fight for the fast songs and he would always push me to add more groove. I think in the end we created a really cool mix of songs that covers a lot of ground in my career".

Ritual sold 3,600 copies in its first week of release in the US and is the first Soulfly album to not debut on the US Billboard 200. It is their first album since 2010's Omen to have its installment of their self-titled song series on the standard edition.

== Reception ==
Professional ratings
Aggregate scores
Source	Rating
Metacritic	75/100
Review scores
Source	Rating
AllMusic	4/5 stars
Blabbermouth.net	8.5/10
Distorted Sound	8/10
Exclaim!	8/10
Metal Hammer	4/5 stars
MetalSucks	3.5/5 stars
Sputnikmusic	4/5

According to the review aggregator Metacritic, Ritual received "generally favorable reviews" based on a weighted average score of 75 out of 100 from 4 critic scores. Prior to release, Wall of Sound writer Jim Birkin rated the album 9/10, stating: "There is undoubtedly some old school Cavalera creeping into his music these days and that can only be a good thing. May all future Soulfly albums contain Josh Wilbur in its production." Metal Hammer writer Matt Mills noted that while the tribal influences is minimal after the title track, the album is still "some of the best groove/death metal of Soulfly's career to date."

Ritual was awarded a 2018 Metal Storm Award for Best Thrash Metal Album. RIFF writer Max Heilman ranked it his 49th favorite album of 2018, stating: "What it lacks in originality it makes up for with brute force."

== Track listing ==
All tracks are written by Max Cavalera.

No.	Title	Length
1.	"Ritual"	4:55
2.	"Dead Behind the Eyes"	5:17
3.	"The Summoning"	4:15
4.	"Evil Empowered"	3:33
5.	"Under Rapture"	5:42
6.	"Demonized"	4:42
7.	"Blood on the Street"	4:32
8.	"Bite the Bullet"	3:52
9.	"Feedback!"	3:00
10.	"Soulfly XI" (instrumental)	3:25
Total length:		43:13

== Personnel ==
Soulfly

- Max Cavalera – vocals, rhythm guitar, sitar on "Soulfly XI"
- Marc Rizzo – lead guitar, flamenco guitar on "Soulfly XI"
- Zyon Cavalera – drums, percussion
- Mike Leon – bass

Additional musicians

- Nick Rowe – programming
- Gary Elthie – drum and vocals on "Ritual", flute on "Blood on the Street"
- Travis Stone – additional vocals on "Ritual"
- D. Randall Blythe – additional vocals on "Dead Behind the Eyes"
- Elizabeth Mictian – daf on "Dead Behind the Eyes"
- Ross Dolan – additional vocals on "Under Rapture"
- Josh Lomatewaima – drum and vocals on "Blood on the Street"
- Chase Numkena – drum and vocals on "Blood on the Street"
- Ron Taho – drum and vocals on "Blood on the Street"
- Igor A. Cavalera – additional vocals on "Feedback!"
- Mark Damon – saxophone on "Soulfly XI"

Production

- Josh Wilbur – engineering, recording, mixing, production
- Nick Rowe – engineering
- Josh Brooks – engineering
- Brad Blackwood – mastering
- Lana Migliore – assistant engineering
- Jeff Sinclair – assistant engineering
- Kyle McAulay – assistant engineering

Artwork

- Eliran Kantor – cover illustration
- Leo Zulueta – band logo
- Glen La Ferman – photography
- Marcelo Vasco – package design, inner illustration

== Charts ==
Chart (2018)	Peak position
Austrian Albums (Ö3 Austria)	22
Belgian Albums (Ultratop Flanders)	47
Belgian Albums (Ultratop Wallonia)	78
Czech Albums (ČNS IFPI)	58
Dutch Albums (Album Top 100)	147
French Albums (SNEP)	125
German Albums (Offizielle Top 100)	27
Scottish Albums (Official Charts)	51
Swiss Albums (Schweizer Hitparade)	19
