= Enslaved (Soulfly album) =

Studio album by Soulfly
- Released: March 13, 2012
- Recorded: September–November 2011
- Studio: Tallcat Studios (Phoenix, Arizona); Frick'In Studios (Vista, California)
- Genre: Death metal; groove metal; thrash metal
- Length: 53:33 (regular edition); 65:45 (special edition)
- Label: Roadrunner
- Producer: Zeuss

Soulfly chronology
Omen (2010)	Enslaved (2012)	Savages (2013)

Singles from Enslaved
- 1. "World Scum" Released: January 25, 2012

Enslaved is the eighth studio album by American heavy metal band Soulfly. It was recorded in fall 2011, mostly in Tallcat Studios in Phoenix, Arizona. Zeuss produced this album. This is the first album to feature Asesino frontman Tony Campos on bass, and the only album to feature former Borknagar drummer David Kinkade on drums, and their last studio album to be released through Roadrunner Records.

== Album information ==
Guests on the album include Dez Fafara of Coal Chamber and DevilDriver on "Redemption of Man by God" and Travis Ryan of Cattle Decapitation on "World Scum", whose vocals were recorded at Frick'In Studios in San Marcos, California. Ryan was brought in to record vocals in place of Adam Warren of Oceano. One song features a guest violinist, among other new styles that they have incorporated into their sound. The album features more death metal influence than their previous releases.

=== Songs ===
"World Scum" is the album's only single released on January 25, 2012 with a video released on February 16. The song "Revengeance" features Max Cavalera's sons, and the lyrics are about the murder of his stepson Dana Wells. "Gladiator", leaked online several days before the release of the album, is a melodic song about Roman gladiators. "Plata O Plomo" features Marc Rizzo playing the flamenco guitar, as well as use of Portuguese and Spanish lyrics. "Soulfly VIII" is the first Soulfly song to feature a violin, performed by Tim Sadow.

== Reception ==
Professional ratings
Aggregate scores
Source	Rating
Metacritic	56/100
Review scores
Source	Rating
AllMusic	3.5/5 stars
Blabbermouth.net	8/10 stars
Classic Rock	3/5 stars
Exclaim!	8/10 stars
Metal Hammer	8/10 stars
PopMatters	7/10 stars
Q	2/5 stars
The Skinny	2/5 stars

The album debuted at number 83 on the Canadian Albums Chart. According to Blabbermouth.net, Enslaved sold 5,900 copies during the first week of its release in the US, thus reaching number 82 on the Billboard 200 chart.

According to the review aggregator Metacritic, Enslaved received "mixed or average reviews" based on a weighted average score of 56 out of 100 from 4 critic scores. Then-drummer David Kinkade described the album as "Arise on crack." According to PopMatters, "every song fits into the structure and tone to create a memorable record packed with outstanding content." Q had a negative response because, according to them, world music elements are getting stale. Greg Pratt of Exclaim! wrote that "this album is the band's best yet, as well as the least caught up in "look at this!" eccentricities, adding up to a solid outing, one that never quite gets to death metal, even with blast beats littered throughout. Instead, it's just huge, thick, thrashed-out, aggro-dude metal, but with, like, 20-percent less neon-dread content."

== Track listing ==
All tracks are written by Max Cavalera except where stated.

Enslaved
No.	Title	Lyrics	Music	Length
1.	"Resistance"			1:53
2.	"World Scum" (featuring Travis Ryan)	Max Cavalera; Travis Ryan		5:20
3.	"Intervention"			3:56
4.	"Gladiator"			4:59
5.	"Legions"			4:19
6.	"American Steel"			4:15
7.	"Redemption of Man by God" (featuring Dez Fafara)	Max Cavalera; Dez Fafara		5:16
8.	"Treachery"			5:49
9.	"Plata o Plomo"	Max Cavalera; Tony Campos		4:53
10.	"Chains"			7:18
11.	"Revengeance" (featuring Richie, Zyon and Igor Cavalera Jr.)	Max Cavalera; Richie Cavalera; Igor Cavalera Jr.	Max Cavalera; Igor Cavalera Jr.; Zyon Cavalera	5:52
Total length:				53:33

Deluxe edition
No.	Title	Length
12.	"Slave"	3:51
13.	"Bastard"	3:57
14.	"Soulfly VIII" (instrumental featuring Tim Sadow)	4:24
Total length:		65:45

Japanese edition
No.	Title	Length
12.	"Slave"	3:51
13.	"Soulfly VIII" (instrumental featuring Tim Sadow)	4:24
14.	"Downstroy" (live)	3:07
Total length:		64:55

== Personnel ==
Soulfly

- Max Cavalera – lead vocals, rhythm guitar, sitar
- Marc Rizzo – lead guitar, flamenco guitar on "Plata o Plomo"
- Tony Campos – bass, vocals on "Plata o Plomo"
- David Kinkade – drums, percussion

Additional musicians

- Travis Ryan – additional vocals on "World Scum"
- Dez Fafara – additional vocals on "Redemption of Man by God"
- Richie Cavalera – additional vocals on "Revengeance"
- Igor Cavalera Jr. – additional vocals and guitar on "Revengeance"
- Zyon Cavalera – drums on "Revengeance"
- Tim Sadow – violin on "Soulfly VIII"

Production

- Zeuss – production, engineering, mixing, mastering
- Dan Frick – additional vocals recording on "World Scum"
- Monte Conner – A&R

Management

- Gloria Cavalera – management
- Christina Stajanovic – assistant
- Bryan Roberts – assistant

Artwork

- Marcelo Vasco – cover art
- Kevin Estrada – photography
- Myriam Santos – Max live shot in purple
- Leo Zuletta – Soulfly logo

== Chart positions ==
Chart (2012)	Peak position
Australian Albums (ARIA)	40
Austrian Albums (Ö3 Austria)	32
Belgian Albums (Ultratop Flanders)	59
Belgian Albums (Ultratop Wallonia)	86
Dutch Albums (Album Top 100)	66
French Albums (SNEP)	98
German Albums (Offizielle Top 100)	38
Swiss Albums (Schweizer Hitparade)	36
US Billboard 200	83
