= Soulfly =

Brazilian-American heavy metal band

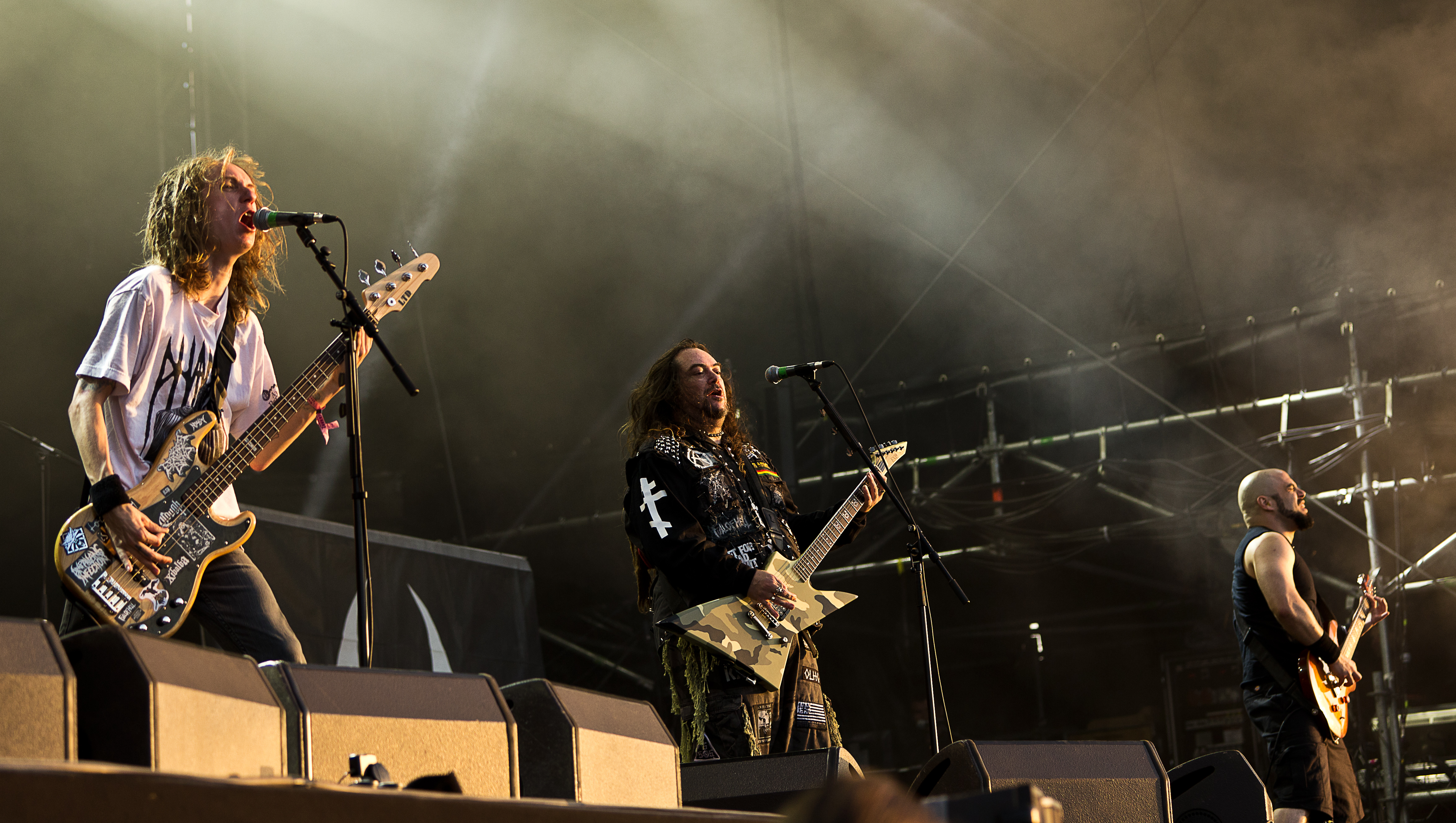
- Soulfly performing at Rockharz Open Air in Germany, 2015

Background information
- Origin: Phoenix, Arizona, U.S.
- Genres: Groove metal; thrash metal; death metal; nu metal
- Works: Discography
- Years active: 1997–present
- Labels: Nuclear Blast; Roadrunner
- Spinoffs: Cavalera Conspiracy
- Spinoff of: Sepultura
- Members: Max Cavalera; Zyon Cavalera; Mike DeLeon; Igor A. Cavalera
- Past members: Marc Rizzo; Marcelo "Cello" Dias; Roy Mayorga; Lúcio Maia; Logan Mader; Mikey Doling; Joe Nunez; Bobby Burns; David Kinkade; Tony Campos; Mike Leon
- Website: soulfly.com

Soulfly is a Brazilian-American heavy metal band formed in Phoenix, Arizona in 1997. Soulfly is led by former Sepultura frontman Max Cavalera, who formed the band after he left the Brazilian group in 1996. To date the band has released thirteen studio albums, one tour EP, twenty-three singles, one video album, and twelve music videos. Their debut album, Soulfly, was released on April 21, 1998, while their most recent album, Chama, was released in October 2025.

Soulfly incorporates many styles of metal with Brazilian tribal and world music, much like Cavalera's previous band Sepultura. The original lyrical content revolved around spirituality, political and religious themes, with later albums encompassing other themes including war, violence, aggression, slavery, hatred and anger. All of their first six studio albums debuted on the United States Billboard 200, with a peak position at number 32 for their second album, Primitive. Soulfly has been certified Gold by the Recording Industry Association of America.

== History ==
=== Formation, self-titled album, and Primitive (1997–2001) ===
Soulfly was formed in Phoenix, Arizona in 1997. Max Cavalera was troubled during the recording of Soulfly's self-titled album, and on the band's website he said that he founded the band "with the idea of combined sounds and spiritual beliefs". As well as leaving Sepultura, he had to deal with the death of his stepson and best friend Dana Wells. The self-titled debut album was released in April 1998, and reached number 79 on the Billboard 200.

The name "Soulfly" came about during the recordings of "Headup" with Deftones, which Cavalera said it invokes "a tribal belief."

"Many tribes — I did this research — in South America and Africa and even North America, believe when they make music, they are evoking the spirits of their ancestors through the music and their souls are flying around them when they are playing their instruments. A lot of them even believe — this is where it gets really crazy — the animal sacrificed to make skins for the drums, even the spirits of the animals get out through the drumming. It's really deep. It's a cool name; it's a positive name. I wanted to do something different. Like I said, I tried for a year to find a name and I had all these names that sounded like Sepultura, but it would just be a copy. I just went the other way. Soulfly is as different of a name as it can get from Sepultura. I've tried to do things in a little bit of a different way and that's how it turned out."

— Max Cavalera (2019)

In addition to the core band, which at the time consisted of Roy Mayorga on drums and percussion, Cello Dias on bass and Lúcio "Jackson Bandeira" Maia on lead guitar, Soulfly featured Burton C. Bell, Dino Cazares and Christian Olde Wolbers from Fear Factory, Fred Durst and DJ Lethal from Limp Bizkit, Chino Moreno from Deftones, Benji Webbe formerly of Welsh band Dub War and now a member of Skindred, Eric Bobo from Cypress Hill, Jorge do Peixe and Gilmar Bola Oito from Chico Science & Nação Zumbi, and Mario C. The album was recorded at Indigo Ranch Studios in Malibu, California, and was overseen by producer Ross Robinson.

In addition to fronting Soulfly, Cavalera also branched out into other areas not usually associated with heavy metal musicians. He became a speaker at music conventions, appearing at CMJ's New Music Marathon in New York and Holland's Crossing Border Festival, both in late 1997, and sang a TV commercial for Sprite in Brazil. After recording the first album, Jackson Bandeira returned to Brazil with Nação Zumbi and was replaced by Logan Mader of Machine Head for the live tour that followed. Soulfly played on the 1998 Ozzfest mainstage alongside Ozzy Osbourne, Megadeth, and Tool, and played small club tours around the world with bands such as System of a Down and Cold. After the world tour in support of Soulfly, Logan Mader was replaced by Mikey Doling who had just been displaced by the breakup of Snot.

A variety of influences, including nu metal, appeared on 2000's Primitive, and it was the most successful album by the band in the U.S., reaching number 32 on the Billboard 200 and number 11 on the independent charts. Joe Nuñez, from Chicago, replaced Roy Mayorga on drums for Primitive. The album featured a number of guest appearances as well, including Corey Taylor of Slipknot and Stone Sour, Sean Lennon, Chino Moreno of Deftones, Tom Araya of Slayer, Grady Avenell of Will Haven, Cutthroat Logic, Babatunde and Asha Rabouin and was produced by Toby Wright. In addition, artwork was created by longtime Bob Marley artist Neville Garrick. The release of the album was followed by world tours with the likes of Pantera, Morbid Angel and Ozzfest.

=== 3, new line-up and Prophecy (2002–2004) ===
In late 2001, Joe Nunez left Soulfly to join Stripping the Pistol, saying that it was "time for [him] to move on". Roy Mayorga departed from his band Medication to rejoin Soulfly for the recording of their third album, 3. 3 was the first Soulfly album which was produced by Max Cavalera. Other musicians performing on 3 included Cristian Machado of Ill Niño, and guitarist Wiley Arnet and drummer Greg Hall of Sacred Reich, and Max's stepson Richie Cavalera. The album reached number 46 on the Billboard 200 in that year. After the release of 3 on June 25, 2002, Soulfly toured throughout Europe and North America with bands such as Slayer, In Flames, God Forbid, and Will Haven.

In September 2003, after the world tour for 3, Dias was fired from the band, and Mayorga and Doling both left the band in protest, leaving Cavalera as the sole remaining member for three weeks.

Cavalera recruited a new lineup in October 2003 for the recording of Soulfly's Prophecy album. Joe Nunez returned on drums with Kentucky native Bobby Burns, formerly of Primer 55, on bass and New Jersey native Marc Rizzo, formerly of Ill Niño, on lead guitar. David Ellefson, formerly of Megadeth at the time, also played bass on several of the album's songs.

Max Cavalera explained on the band's website that he wanted to use different musicians as part of the group for each album. "This is an approach that I've wanted to do for a while. I never wanted Soulfly to be a band like Metallica, with the same four guys. On every Soulfly album, we've changed the line up and it will probably continue that way. In order to do that, I had to start from the inside out and bring in people who caught my attention, that I had never played with before, and create this." While a member of Sepultura, Cavalera had shown an interest in world music as shown in Roots, featuring elements of the music of Brazil's indigenous peoples. This approach continued on the Prophecy album, with Cavalera traveling to Serbia to record with traditional musicians. On the song "Moses", he worked with Serbian band Eyesburn, which also features reggae influences from one of his heroes, Bob Marley. Other tracks on the album feature instruments from the Middle Ages, sheepskin bagpipes, and Serbian Gypsies. Danny Marianino and Asha Rabouin returned as guest vocalists on Prophecy, as well, and Max Cavalera produced the album. Prophecy was released on March 30, 2004, and in April of that year had reached a peak of number 82 on the Billboard 200, although it has reached the top 50 of the Australian album charts. Soulfly followed the album release with tours supporting Black Sabbath and Morbid Angel.

In February 2005, Soulfly released their first DVD, entitled The Song Remains Insane. This was a biography of the band, containing live footage from all over the globe, interviews, and all of the band's music videos. In August 2005, Roadrunner Records reissued their self-titled first album as part of the label's 25th anniversary celebration.

=== Dark Ages (2005–2007) ===
In December 2004, as recording was beginning for Soulfly's fifth studio album, the band was rocked by several tragedies that affected the outcome of the album. On December 8, Cavalera's friend "Dimebag" Darrell Abbott was shot and killed while playing in Ohio, and on December 10, Cavalera's eight-month-old grandson Moses unexpectedly died due to health complications. The following fall, on October 4, 2005, Dark Ages was released. Many critics have described Dark Ages as a return to Cavalera's thrash metal roots of the early Sepultura days; however, the world music influence found on the first four Soulfly albums is still present. In fact, this time, Cavalera traveled to five different countries — Serbia, Turkey, Russia, France, and the United States — in order to record all the sounds that he desired to have on the new album.

The core band on Dark Ages still consisted of Cavalera, Joe Nunez, Bobby Burns and Marc Rizzo, and on this album, Dave Ellefson came back to lend his talents to a couple of tracks, Eyesburn vocalist Coyote sang on "Innerspirit", Stormtroopers of Death vocalist Billy Milano and Russian singer Paul Fillipenko of FAQ screamed on the hardcore influenced "Molotov", and Max's stepson, Ritchie Cavalera from Phoenix-based band Incite, sang on "Staystrong". Soulfly supported Dark Ages on a world tour with various bands such as Deftones, Korn, Throwdown, and Skindred that has stretched through North America, South America, Europe, Russia, and Australia.

On August 17, 2006, Soulfly played the 10th Annual D-Low Memorial show with several guest artists including Dave Ellefson and Roy Mayorga, the latter of whom who currently plays with Stone Sour. Most notably, Max was reunited onstage for the first time in 10 years with his brother Igor Cavalera. Max and Igor formed Sepultura together in the early 1980s, but had not played together since Max's departure in 1997. Igor joined the band midway through the set for a jam on the drums and stayed onstage to play the Sepultura classics "Roots Bloody Roots" and "Attitude" on Joe Nunez's drum kit.

In the time between legs of Soulfly's world tour for Dark Ages and afterwards, members of Soulfly stayed extremely busy by focusing on projects and activities outside of the band. Cavalera guested on the Apocalyptica single "Repressed" with Bullet For My Valentine vocalist Matt Tuck during a visit to Germany, went to Russia in January 2007 to guest on the album Circus Dogs by Russian hardcore band FAQ and played on Saint-Petersbourg with Radiohead album sound producer Nike "Naik" Groshin, played a surprise jam session in Serbia with Dan Lilker of Brutal Truth and S.O.D., and spent time in Arizona writing for future releases. Marc Rizzo spent the year on the road throughout North America playing his solo flamenco-meets-shred metal, gaining him further recognition as one of the world's premier metal guitarists. Earlier in 2005, Rizzo had released his debut solo album, Colossal Myopia, through Shrapnel Records, and in 2007 he prepared his follow-up, The Ultimate Devotion, which has now been released. Burns purchased a studio in Orlando, Florida with his partner Tim Lau, revived his former band Primer 55, and worked on new releases for his Love Said No and King Street projects. In September 2006, Burns suffered a mild stroke, was forced to sit out of Soulfly's North American tour, and his spot in the band was briefly filled by Dave Ellefson and Danny Lilker. Nunez worked on the development of several drum accessories with Slug Drums, and taught drum lessons and worked construction in Chicago. Soulfly ventured to Undercity Recording Studios in March 2007 to record a cover of the Marilyn Manson single "The Beautiful People" with Logan Mader producing. The song was later released in June 2007 by Kerrang! magazine in issue 1164 as part of their Higher Voltage compilation. During time in the studio, Max Cavalera also recorded vocals for the song "War Is My Destiny" with Ill Bill and Immortal Technique for Ill Bill's second studio album, The Hour of Reprisal, which released on September 16, 2008.

=== Conquer and Omen (2008–2010) ===
In August 2007, Soulfly did a tour that consisted of a mixture of festival and club shows through Europe before playing the 11th Annual D-Low Memorial Show in Tempe, Arizona on August 31, 2007. Cavalera Conspiracy also made their debut live performance at the show by opening for Soulfly. One week after performing the show, Soulfly went to Bobby Burns and Tim Lau's newly renovated Porch Studio in Orlando, Florida to begin work on their sixth studio album, which Cavalera had begun writing during the summer. After working halfway through recording until September 29, Cavalera halted the session to travel throughout Egypt to record more sounds to integrate into the new songs. In November 2007, Cavalera returned to Orlando to complete tracking and the album was mixed by Andy Sneap in early 2008. The album featured collaborations Dave Peters from Throwdown and David Vincent from Morbid Angel.

Soulfly released their sixth album entitled Conquer on July 29, 2008. Following the release of the album, the band toured the United States with Devastation and Bleed the Sky in the fall, toured Europe in winter of 2009 with Incite, played a small UK and European festivals during the spring and summer of 2009, and went on a fall 2009 U.S. headlining tour with Cattle Decapitation, Prong, and Mutiny Within.

Soulfly entered the Edge of the Earth Studios in Los Angeles, California, on November 6, 2009, to begin recording their seventh album with Max Cavalera and Logan Mader both producing. Through a series of streaming web video updates, frontman Max Cavalera revealed on November 13, 2009, that the album would be called Omen and would feature guest appearances by Tommy Victor of Prong and Greg Puciato of The Dillinger Escape Plan. Additionally, the album features performances on drums from Max's sons: Zyon Cavalera on a b-side cover of Sepultura's "Refuse-Resist" and Igor Cavalera (not to be confused with his brother of the same name) on a cover of Excel's "Your Life, My Life". Omen has been released worldwide on May 25, 2010.

From May 13 – December 16, 2010, Soulfly conducted a world tour in support of their new album Omen.

On July 18, 2010, bassist Bobby Burns posted following message on his Twitter profile: "To all the fans... Soulfly and I have decided to part ways. Stay tuned for my next projects already in the works. Thanks 4 ur support!!!"

=== Line up change, Enslaved and Savages (2011–2013) ===
On July 1, 2011, Soulfly announced that the group had recruited former Static-X and current Asesino, and then Prong, and Ministry bassist Tony Campos into the band, replacing Bobby Burns.

In August 2011, Joe Nunez was replaced by Borknagar drummer David Kinkade. In September 2011, the band announced they entered the recording studio to make their next album due for an early 2012 release. In late October it was revealed that recording had finished, and Kinkade claimed that the new album is like "Arise on crack". Confirmed guests on the album were Adam Warren of Oceano and Dez Fafara of Coal Chamber and DevilDriver, although Warren pulled out of recording and was replaced by Cattle Decapitation frontman Travis Ryan. In the December 2011 issue of Metal Hammer, Cavalera stated that the main theme of the album would be slavery, with song titles "Slave", "Chains", "Legions" (a song about the Roman Empire), "Gladiator", "Redemption of Man by God" (featuring Dez Fafara), and "Revengeance" (with Max's 3 sons featuring: Zyon on drums, Richie on vocals and Igor writing half the guitar riffs). The album was produced by Zeuss with artwork from Marcelo Vasco, who has designed album artwork for bands such as Borknagar, Obituary, and Dimmu Borgir. On December 6, the album title was announced to be Enslaved and has a release date of March 13, 2012. Soulfly performed at the 13th annual Gathering of the Juggalos in Cave-in-Rock, IL August 2012. Throughout 2012, Soulfly have headlined the "Maximum Cavalera Tour", supported by Incite (fronted by Richie Cavalera) and Lody Kong (featuring Igor Cavalera Jr. and Zyon Cavalera). In October 2012 Kinkade announced his retirement from drumming, leaving Soulfly after their show in Bangkok. Max's son Zyon, who performed during the South America tour earlier in the year, will take over drums for the upcoming US tour and for the foreseeable future.

In April 2013 Max announced Soulfly's intention to record more material after their tour, with producer Terry Date, and confirmed on May 3 that Zyon would perform drums on the album. In July Max announced that the album would be called Savages. The band released the album on September 30 in the UK, October 1 in the US, and October 4 in Europe. Savages features a number of guest vocalists including Igor Cavalera Jr. of Lody Kong, Jamie Hanks of I Declare War, Neil Fallon of Clutch, and Mitch Harris of Napalm Death.

=== Archangel and Ritual (2014–2019) ===
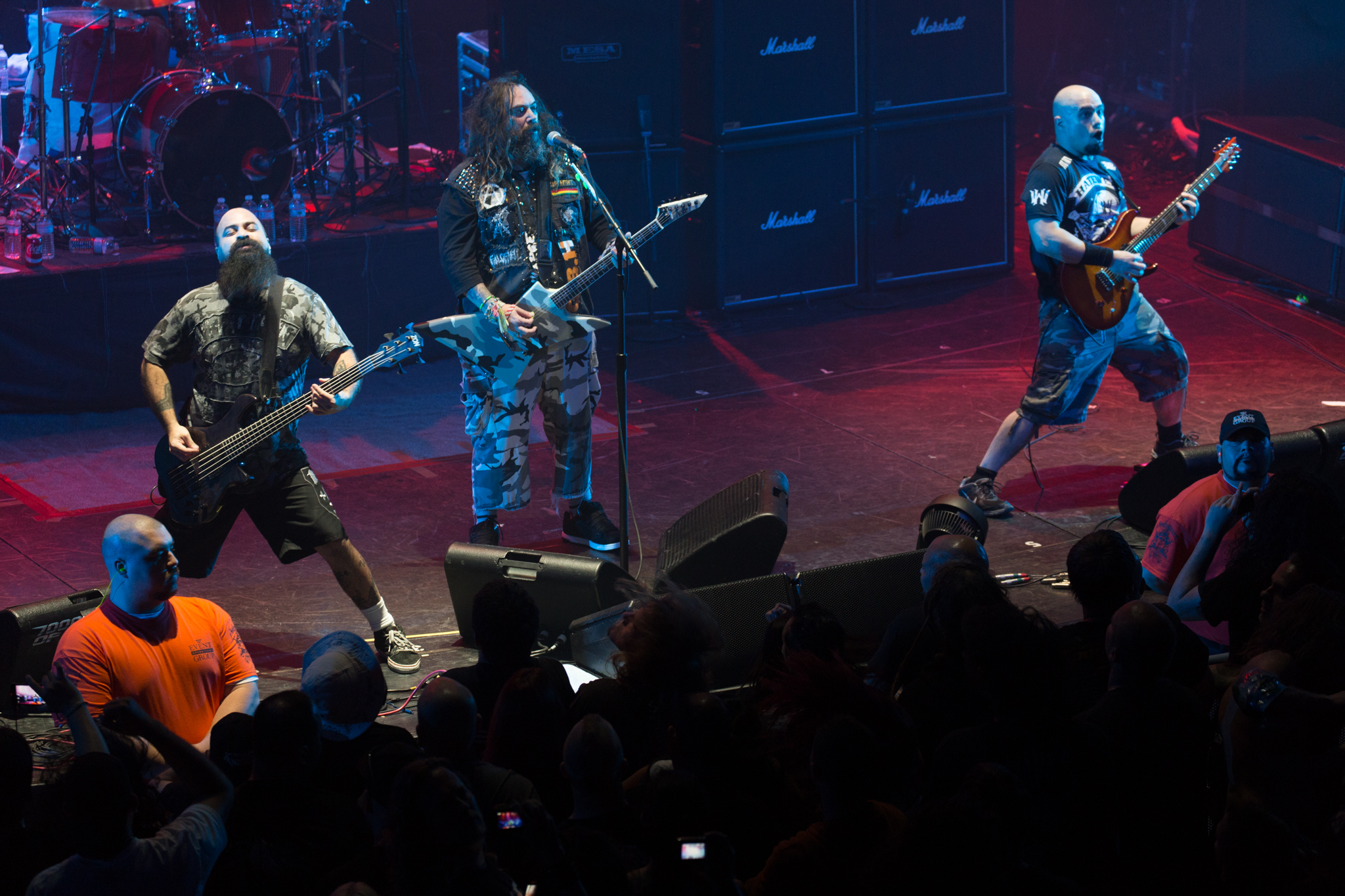
Soulfly at 70000 Tons of Metal 2015. L–R: Tony Campos, Max Cavalera, Marc Rizzo

On December 6, 2014, Max Cavalera said through an interview that he started writing for the tenth Soulfly record. Cavalera and his gang entered the studio on January 3, 2015. On May 1, bassist Tony Campos announced via his Facebook page that he was leaving Soulfly to join Fear Factory. Archangel, produced by Matt Hyde, was released on August 14, 2015, through Nuclear Blast. They embarked on the "We Sold Our Souls To Metal" tour on September 30, 2015, to promote the album. The tour was accompanied by the bands Soilwork, Decapitated and Shattered Sun. The tour lasted for a 27 show trek ending in Albuquerque, NM on October 30. They played at The Rockbar Theater in San Jose, CA on December 12, 2015.

In 2017, they toured North America with Cannabis Corpse, Harm's Way, Noisem and Lody Kong. In this tour, they played the Nailbomb album Point Blank in full, bringing Igor Jr. into the band as co-lead vocalist and keyboardist/sampler for the tour. After releasing his latest album with Cavalera Conspiracy, Max revealed his plans to finish writing and recording the next Soulfly album in early 2018, while also declaring his intentions to bring back some of the tribal elements from the band's early days to commemorate 20 years since Soulfly's self-titled debut album. A live album of their performance at 1998 Dynamo Open Air, entitled simply Live at Dynamo Open Air 1998, was released on June 22, 2018.

Soulfly released their eleventh studio album, Ritual, on October 19, 2018.

=== Departure of Marc Rizzo and Totem (2020–2023) ===
In a June 2020 interview on Kazakhstan's "Armatura" podcast, Cavalera confirmed that he had been "writing some riffs" for the twelfth Soulfly album. He said, "I'm very inspired right now for riffs and music. I listen to a lot of heavy stuff. So I've been composing new Soulfly music, hopefully for next year. So I think next year we'll have a new Soulfly record." In a May 2021 interview with Finland's Kaaos TV, Cavalera further reiterated the album's progress and confirmed that it would likely not be released before 2022: "We're just working on it. We're still just developing it. It's in the early stages of being recorded. We recorded some, and we have to record a little bit more. But we're just really taking our time." During the 2022 tour, Cavalera announced the new album would come out around the month of July 2022.

In August 2021, it was announced lead guitarist Marc Rizzo had left the band, and that his replacement on the 2021 North American tour would be Dino Cazares of Fear Factory. On May 5, 2022, the band released the single "Superstition" and announced that the new album's title would be Totem, which was released on August 5.

On January 5, 2023, the band announced Mike DeLeon of Philip H. Anselmo & The Illegals as the band's new touring guitarist. It was later revealed that other guitarists were also planned to cover many of the tour dates for 2023.

=== Chama (2024–present) ===
In a January 2024 interview on the "Nu Pod With Joshua Toomey and Ro Kohli" podcast, Cavalera confirmed that he would be "working on new Soulfly this year, writing and hopefully recording" the band's next album for a 2025 release.

On August 29, 2025, Soulfly released "Storm the Gates" as the first single for their then-upcoming thirteenth studio album Chama, released on October 24.

In February 2026, the band was confirmed to be on the roster for the Louder Than Life festival taking place in Louisville in September.

== Musical style ==
Soulfly have been described as nu metal, thrash metal, groove metal, death metal and alternative metal. Soulfly originally played nu metal but moved away from the genre after the early 2000s, although they would throw back to their earlier nu metal sound in Chama. Soulfly often incorporate elements of world music such as tribal music and Middle Eastern music into their music.

== Band members ==
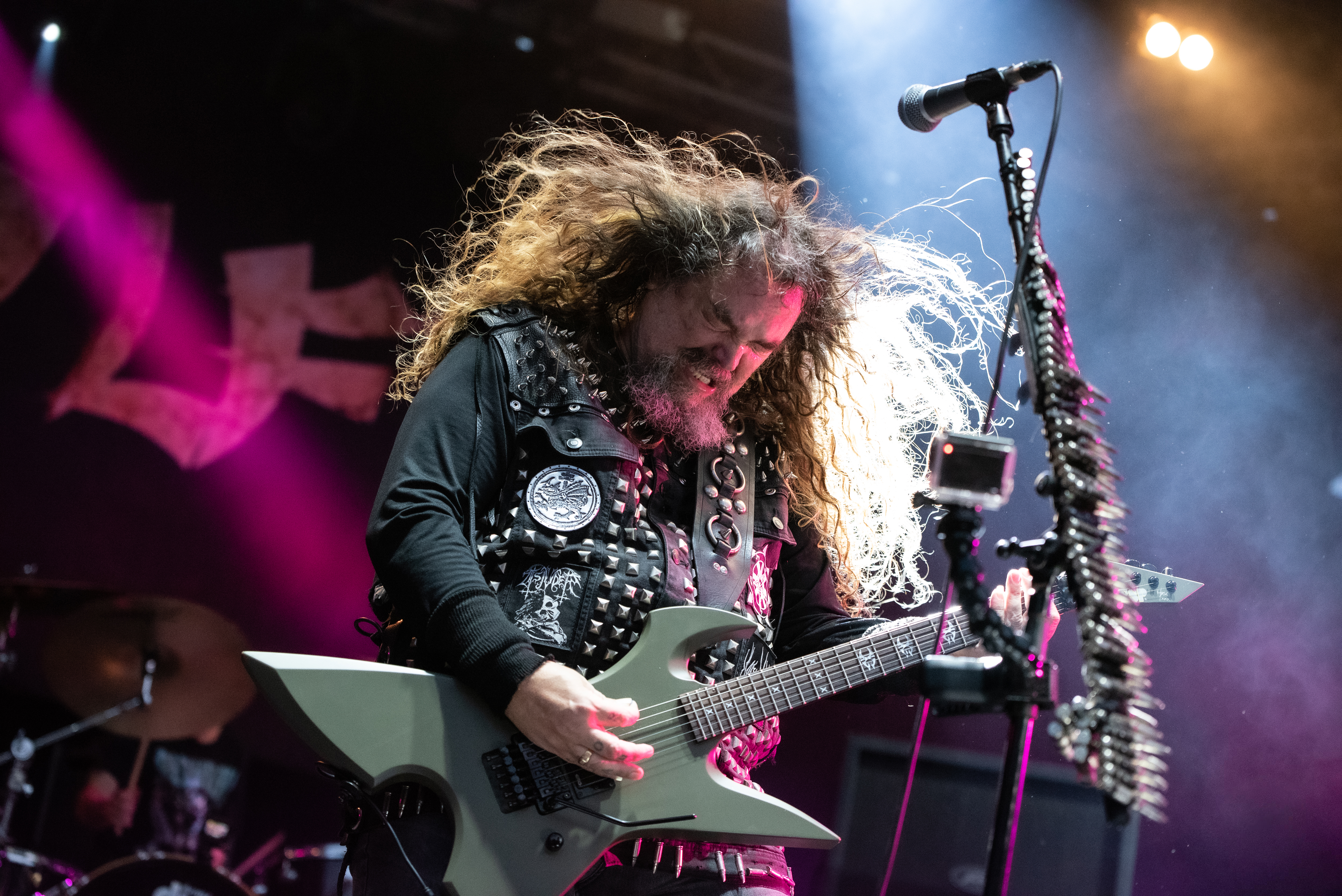
Max Cavalera

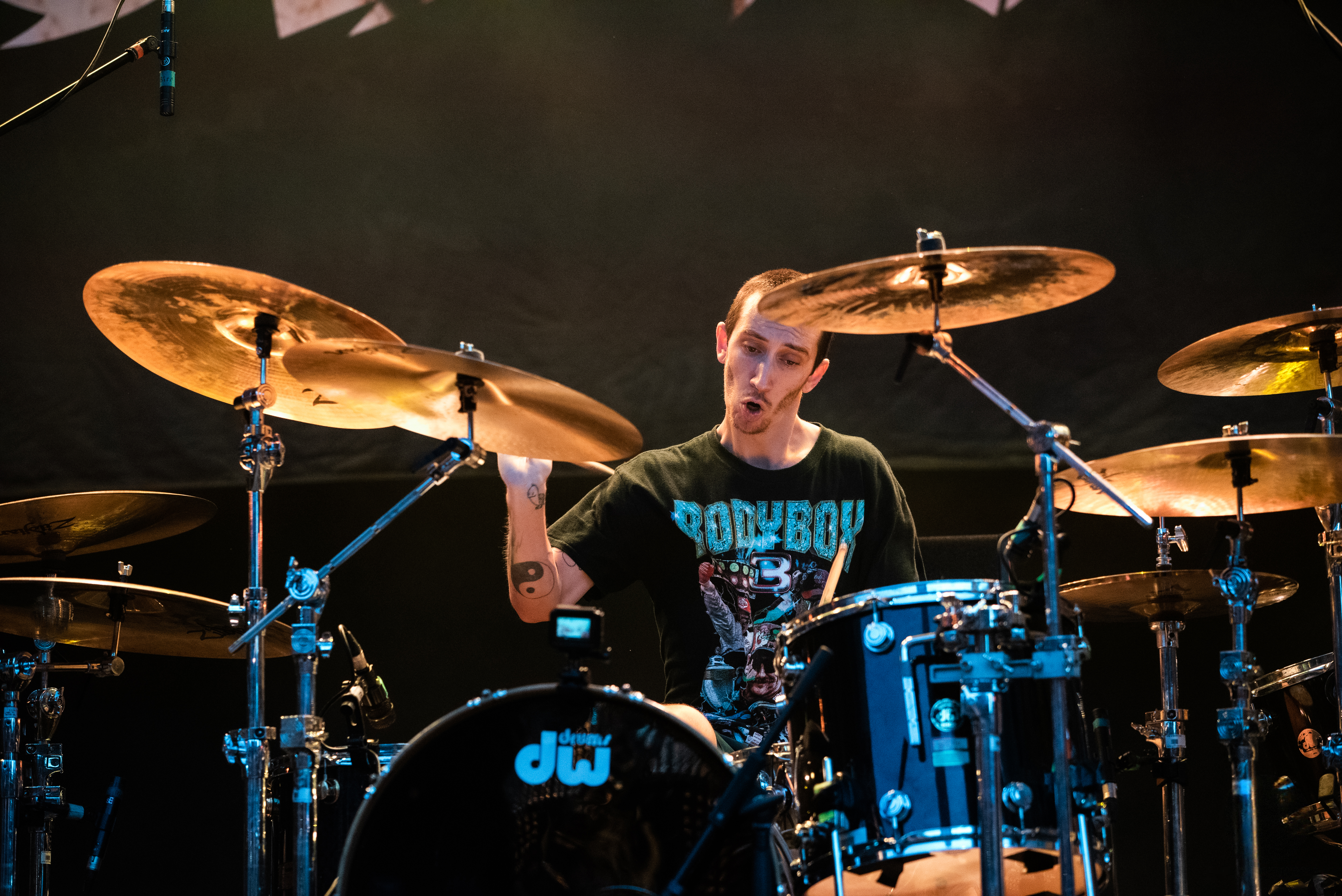
Zyon Cavalera

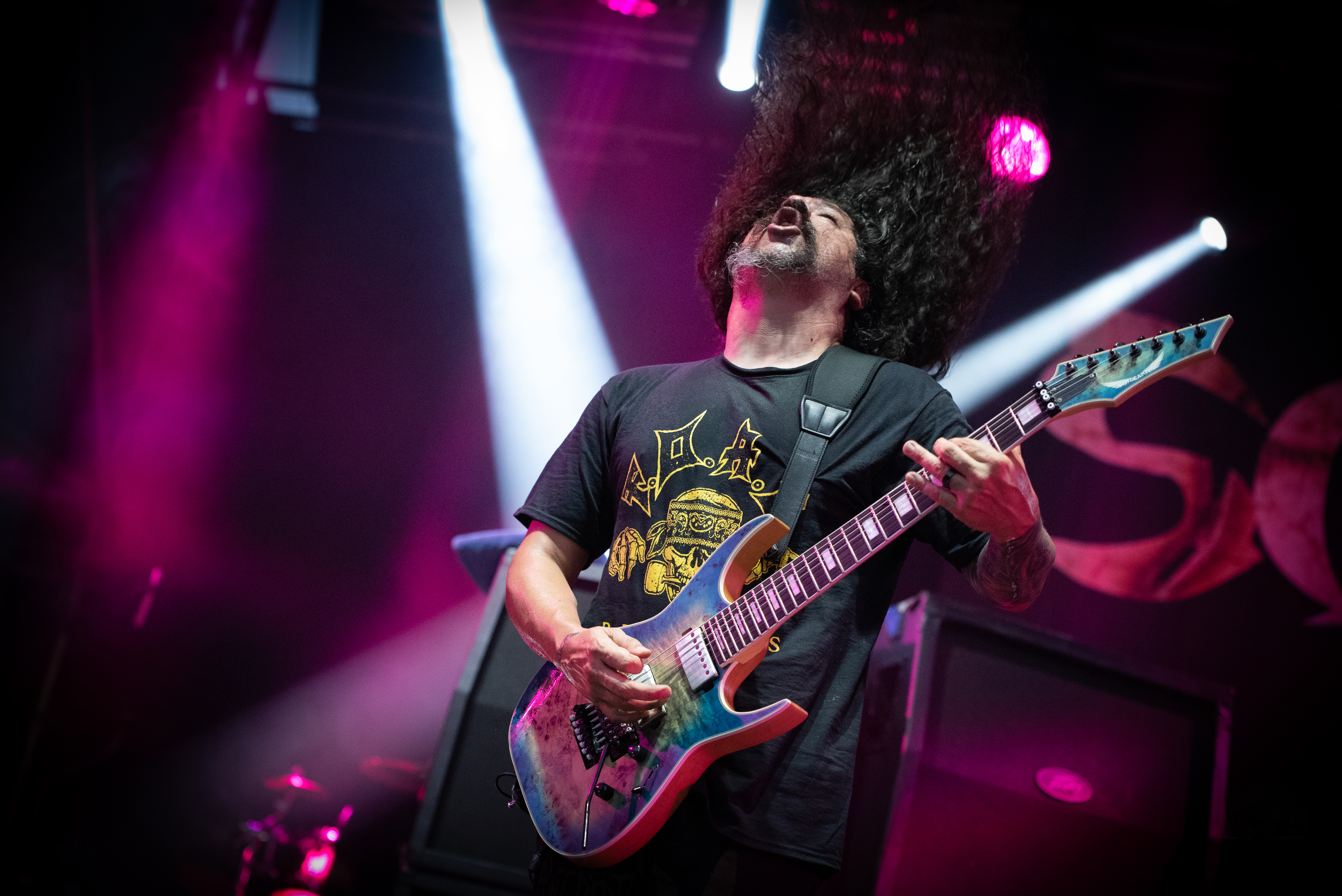
Mike DeLeon

Current members

- Max Cavalera – lead vocals, rhythm guitar (1997–present), bass guitar (2025–present)
- Zyon Cavalera – drums, percussion (2012–present)
- Mike DeLeon – lead guitar (2023–present), backing vocals (2025–present)

Current touring members

- Chase Bryant – bass (2025–present)

== Discography ==
- Soulfly (1998)
- Primitive (2000)
- 3 (2002)
- Prophecy (2004)
- Dark Ages (2005)
- Conquer (2008)
- Omen (2010)
- Enslaved (2012)
- Savages (2013)
- Archangel (2015)
- Ritual (2018)
- Totem (2022)
- Chama (2025)

== Concert tours ==
- Supporting Snot (April–May 1998)
- The Song Remains Insane Tour (May–June 1998; August 1998)
- Ozzfest 1998 (July–August 1998)
- Strangeland Tour (September–November 1998)
- South American Tour (December 1998)
- Big Day Out 1999 (January 1999)
- Bring Da Shit Tour (April–May 1999; July–August 1999)
- Supporting Rammstein (June 1999)
- Abril Pro Rock (April 2000) Recife
- Ozzfest 2000
- Primitive Tour (September–December 2000; April–June 2001)
- Supporting Pantera (February–March 2001)
- Supporting Static-X (January–February 2002)
- Call to Arms Tour (June–July 2002; November 2002–July 2003)
- Supporting Slayer (August–September 2002)
- Prophecy Tour (March–October 2004)
- Disturbing the Peace (February–July 2005)
- The Dark Ages Tour (October 2005–October 2006)
- Australian Gigantour (October 2006)
- The Dark Ages Tour II (April–December 2007)
- Conquer Tour (August 2008–October 2009)
- Conquering North American (March–April 2010)
- Omen Tour (May–December 2011)
- Enslaved Tour (February–July 2012)
- Maximum Cavalera Tour (July 2012–August 2013)
- Savages Tour (October 2013–October 2014)
- From the Amazon to the Nile Tour, co-headlining with Nile (April 2018–May 2018)
- Totem Tour (August 2022–present)

== Notes ==
- Christe, Ian (2003). Sound of the Beast: The Complete Headbanging History of Heavy Metal. HarperCollins. ISBN 0-380-81127-8
