= Chama (album) =

Studio album by Soulfly
- Released: October 24, 2025
- Recorded: 2024–2025
- Studio: Platinum Underground (Mesa, Arizona)
- Genres: Groove metal; nu metal
- Length: 32:27
- Label: Nuclear Blast
- Producers: Zyon Cavalera; Arthur Rizk

Soulfly chronology
Totem (2022)	Chama (2025)

Chama is the thirteenth studio album by the American heavy metal band Soulfly, released on October 24, 2025, via Nuclear Blast Records. Vocalist and rhythm guitarist, Max Cavalera, described the album as a "fast, heavy, spiritual, and raw" revival of the band's "tribal groove metal sound". It is the band's shortest studio album to date, running at just thirty-two and a half minutes.

== Background and recording ==
The album was recorded at the Platinum Underground in Mesa, Arizona, and was produced by Arthur Rizk and Zyon Cavalera, drummer for Soulfly and son of Max Cavalera. Max has stated in interviews regarding his son that he has appreciated having a "younger mind on the project", and that "having Zyon produce the album... and really thinking outside of the basics in some of the songs" made the album feel special.

According to Max Cavalera, the name of the album came from UFC fighter Alex Pereira, who uses the word "chama" as a catchphrase. Pereira acknowledged the naming of the album in a post-fight interview at UFC 320.

== Concept ==
Physical copies of the album come with a short story by Igor Amadeus Cavalera about a boy named Chama who grows up in the favelas of Rio de Janeiro. Chama is surrounded by the "spirits of the city", who have died from poverty, drug addiction, gang violence or at the hands of the Pacifying Police Unit. When his mother passes away, Chama is left alone and grief-stricken until her own spirit comes to him. She instructs him to leave behind the corruption of the city and "find the land of trees and water where the fire burns through the night". Chama walks, hitch-hikes and hops trains "like a vagabond" to get out of Rio until he reaches the jungle. There he encounters different, benevolent spirits of the trees, animals and elements, and is accepted by an indigenous tribe. He learns their music and that his own name means "flame", and he has a vision which teaches him that "all living things burn with the same fire, an inexhaustible blaze that would crackle until the end of time".

== Critical reception ==
Professional ratings
Review scores
Source	Rating
Angry Metal Guy	3/5
Blabbermouth.net	9/10
Distorted Sound	8/10
Kerrang!	4/5
Metal Hammer	3.5/5 stars

Blabbermouth.net stated that "the tribal aesthetic that propelled them has been revived and given several thousand volts up its jungle-dwelling backside", going on to opine that "Soulfly have rediscovered groove, momentum and the wild spirit of esoteric heaviness".

"Never ones to knowingly under-do the bludgeon," Sam Law of Kerrang! stated, "the release of sheer primeval force as first song proper "Storm the Gates" explodes into life will startle even longtime aficionados... Hammering away like a cross between Cavalera at his heaviest and Mick Gordon's hell-raising Doom soundtrack, those brutal 161 seconds culminate with what appears to be the sound of the plug rattling loose on an overloaded amp-stack".

== Track listing ==
All tracks are written by Max Cavalera and Zyon Cavalera except where stated.

No.	Title	Writer(s)	Length
1.	"Indigenous Inquisition"		2:01
2.	"Storm the Gates"		2:41
3.	"Nihilist"		2:46
4.	"No Pain = No Power"	Dino Cazares; Max Cavalera; Zyon Cavalera	3:57
5.	"Ghenna"		1:55
6.	"Black Hole Scum"		4:30
7.	"Favela/Dystopia"	Max Cavalera; Zyon Cavalera; Igor Amadeus Cavalera	3:18
8.	"Always Was, Always Will Be..."		3:27
9.	"Soulfly XIII"		3:43
10.	"Chama"	Max Cavalera; Zyon Cavalera; Igor Amadeus Cavalera	4:09
Total length:			32:27

== Personnel ==
=== Soulfly ===
- Max Cavalera – vocals, rhythm guitar on tracks 1–3, 5–10, bass on tracks 1–3, 5–6, 8–9
- Mike DeLeon – lead guitar
- Zyon Cavalera – drums, percussion

=== Additional musicians ===
- Gabriel Franco – vocals on "No Pain = No Power"
- Ben Cook – vocals on "No Pain = No Power"
- Dino Cazares – rhythm guitar on "No Pain = No Power"
- Igor Amadeus Cavalera – bass on "No Pain = No Power", "Favela/Dystopia" and "Chama"
- Todd Jones – guest vocals on "Nihilist"
- Michael Amott – guitar solo on "Ghenna"
- Michael Rizk – additional derbake
- Arthur Rizk – additional guitar solos
- Chunk – percussion
- Bootsie – percussion
- Mike McArdle – percussion
- Remi Auriemma – percussion
- Daiana Cavalera – percussion
- Mark Corona – percussion
- Tommy Gibbons – percussion

=== Production ===
- Zyon Cavalera – production
- Arthur Rizk – production, mixing, mastering
- John Aquilino – engineering
- Tommy Gibbons – engineering

== Charts ==
Chart performance for Chama
Chart (2025)	Peak position
Austrian Albums (Ö3 Austria)	23
Belgian Albums (Ultratop Flanders)	183
