= Max Cavalera =

Brazilian heavy metal vocalist and guitarist (born 1969)

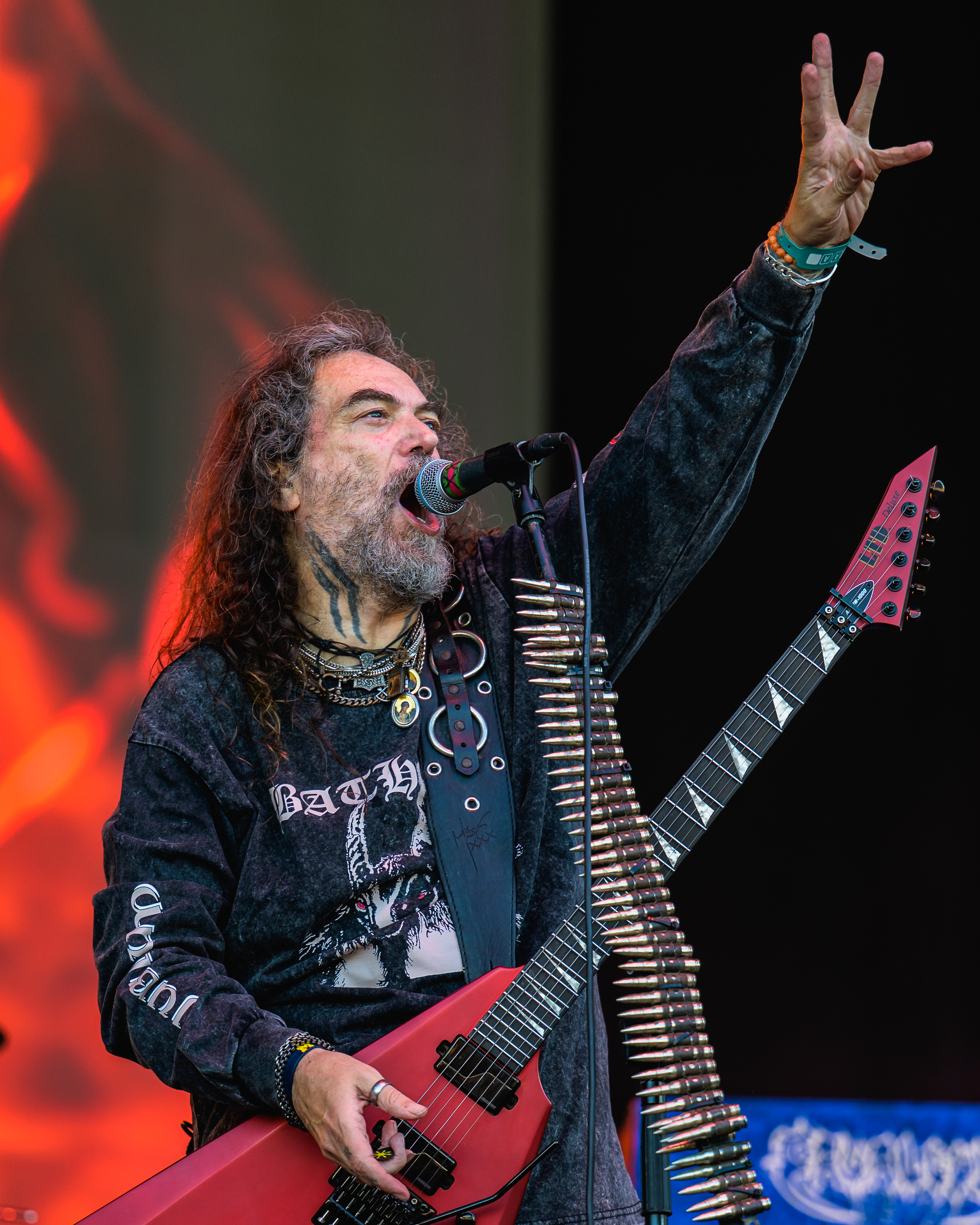
- Cavalera performing in 2026

Background information
- Also known as: Max Possessed
- Born: Massimiliano Antonio Cavalera; 4 August 1969 (age 57); Belo Horizonte, Minas Gerais, Brazil
- Genres: Thrash metal; death metal; groove metal; nu metal
- Occupations: Musician; singer; songwriter
- Instruments: Vocals; guitar
- Years active: 1984–present
- Member of: Soulfly; Cavalera Conspiracy; Nailbomb; Killer Be Killed; Metal All Stars; Go Ahead and Die
- Formerly of: Sepultura; Roadrunner United; Guerrilha
- Website: cavaleraconspiracy.net

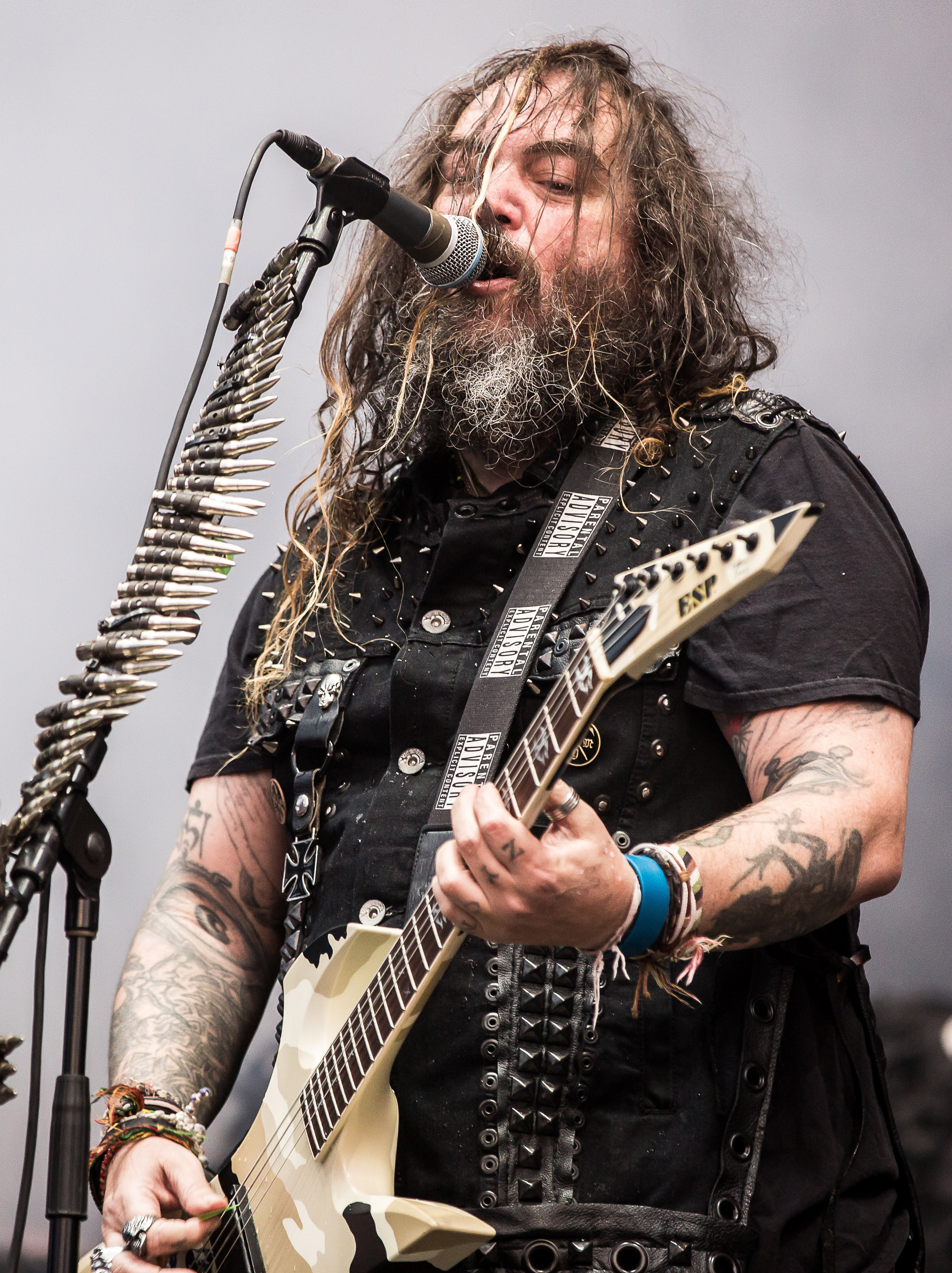
Cavalera performing in 2018

Massimiliano Antonio "Max" Cavalera (Brazilian Portuguese: [masimiliˈɐnu ɐ̃ˈtoni.u kavaˈleɾɐ, - ɐ̃ˈtonju -]; born 4 August 1969) is a Brazilian musician. He co-founded the heavy metal band Sepultura in 1984 with his brother Igor Cavalera, and was the band's lead singer and rhythm guitarist until his departure in December 1996. He currently plays in the heavy metal bands Soulfly, Cavalera Conspiracy, Nailbomb, Killer Be Killed and Go Ahead and Die.

== Biography ==
Max Cavalera's father, Graziano Cavalera, was an employee of the Italian Consulate in Belo Horizonte. He died at 41 years of age, when Max was nine years old. Cavalera's family was in a state of financial crisis and family turbulence when he formed Sepultura with his younger brother, Igor, in the bohemian neighborhood of Santa Tereza in Belo Horizonte. He moved to São Paulo in 1989 together with the other members of the band, sharing an apartment in Santa Cecília, São Paulo. In 1992, he relocated to Phoenix, Arizona. He did not begin to make spiritual music until after he quit Sepultura in December 1996, very shortly after he played his final show with the band. He then formed Soulfly in Phoenix, Arizona.

He reunited with his brother Igor in their band Cavalera Conspiracy.

Cavalera appears in the 2009 video game Grand Theft Auto IV: The Lost and Damned as himself on the ingame radio station LCHC.

In 2013, Cavalera released his autobiography, titled My Bloody Roots; his co-writer was the British author Joel McIver, and the book's foreword was written by Dave Grohl.

== Artistry ==
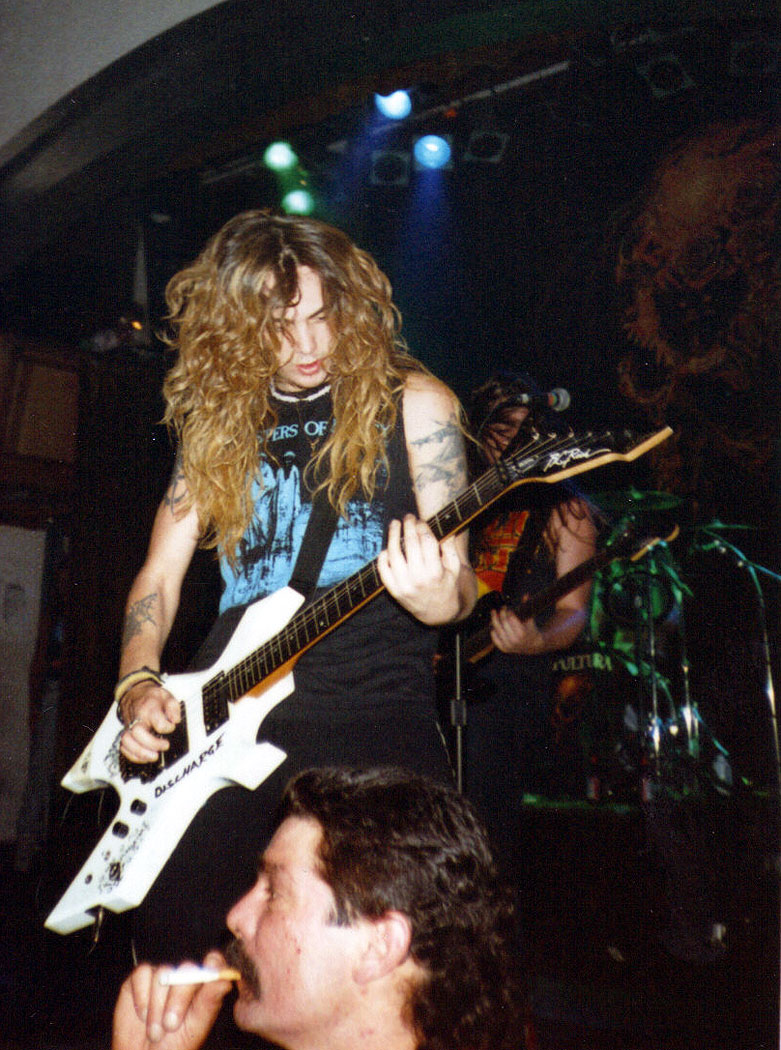
Cavalera in 1989

Cavalera is known for playing his six-string guitar with only four strings; the B and high E (2nd and 1st) strings are removed. The inspiration struck when he broke both strings one day and he did not bother to replace them. A friend later commented that the guitar looked better without them, leading to it becoming his trademark. Cavalera used to play with three strings, but eventually started playing with four due to Andreas Kisser writing a Sepultura song that required another string. He did return to using three temporarily with his project Nailbomb.

His earlier lyrics for Soulfly were influenced by religion and spirituality, though he is critical of religion. His later albums, starting with Dark Ages, began to incorporate lyrical themes of violence, warfare, anger and hatred. His albums have all been dedicated to God, and he has often been depicted by the press as a man of religion, especially in the United States, something that Cavalera himself says he does not understand:

I do hate a lot of "religion", but people like Christ – yeah they inspire me. I mean if you look at Christ, He was hanging around with the lowlifes, prostitutes and the losers you know, not going around with those high society motherfuckers you see trying to sell Jesus today!

When asked in an interview whether he was a Christian and whether Soulfly was a Christian band, he said:

No. I mean, if I was a Christian I would wear all these different kinds of omens. Because Christian people are so close-minded. A priest would not accept that. So I don't like the concept of Christianity in terms of being so close-minded. It is the same with music. Sometimes I compare preachers to close-minded musicians or close-minded listeners, who only like one kind of music. Some preachers are the same. And they don't tolerate Hindus, Buddhists or whatever. Only them. It's bullshit. So Soulfly is not a Christian band at all. Very much opposite. But we are very spiritual. Spiritual has nothing to do with Christianity anyway. It has been here since the beginning of time.

When asked about the Varg Vikernes church burnings, he said "I support church burnings 100 percent, but why don't we just burn everything. Mosques, temples, all religious buildings." However, he later claimed his views changed about the church burnings and called them "too violent". He has stated that he does believe in God, "But it might be different than the God the preacher preaches about."

Of enduring influence on his music is the untimely death of his stepson, Dana Wells, who was killed in a car crash after the release of Roots in 1996. The songs "Bleed", "First Commandment", "Pain", "Tree of Pain" and "Revengeance" are tributes to Wells, as well as Deftones' song "Headup", in which Cavalera featured and co-wrote.

== Personal life ==
Since 1992, Cavalera has lived in Phoenix, Arizona with his wife Gloria and their five children. Three of his sons are also active in music, with Richie fronting Incite and Igor and Zyon performing in Lody Kong. Jason tours as Zyon's drum tech, amongst other various duties behind the scenes. In 2012 and 2013, Zyon toured with Soulfly after David Kinkade's retirement, later becoming their official drummer. Igor briefly filled in as bassist for Soulfly in 2015 after Tony Campos left the band, touring as keyboardist and co-vocalist during Soulfly's Point Blank Tour. In 2025, Igor toured with Nailbomb.

In 2022, Cavalera attracted criticism after a 2014 clip resurfaced of him telling a Moscow crowd that he supported the internationally unrecognised Russian annexation of Crimea.

On July 5, 2023, Cavalera announced that his mother Vania had died.

Cavalera is a fan of Palmeiras and the Detroit Lions.

== Collaborations ==
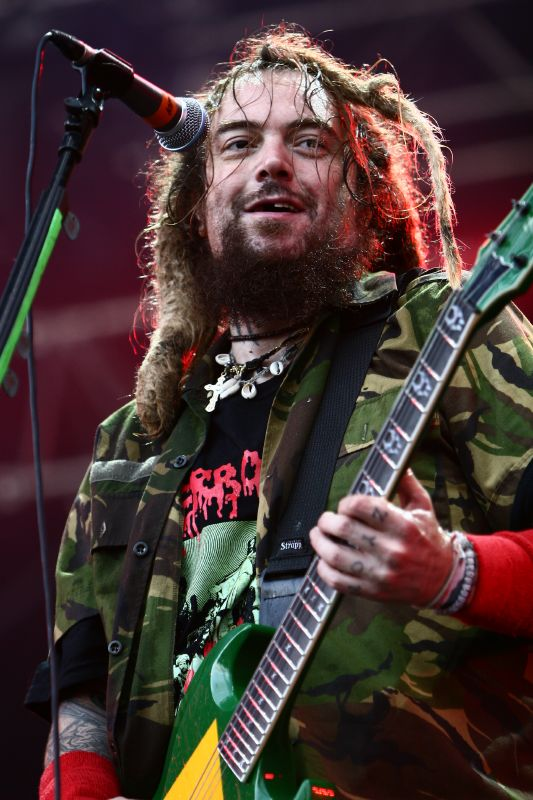
Cavalera with Cavalera Conspiracy at the Eurockéennes festival in France, 2008

Cavalera has collaborated with many different artists while in Sepultura and Soulfly. In 2003, he joined forces with former Nirvana drummer and Foo Fighters' frontman Dave Grohl to produce "Red War" for the self-titled release of Dave Grohl's metal project Probot.

=== Musicians ===
Cavalera has worked with the following musicians:

- Tom Araya (Slayer) – guest vocals and bass on "Terrorist", on Soulfly's Primitive
- Grady Avenell (Will Haven) – vocals on "Pain", on Soulfly's Primitive
- Burton C. Bell (Fear Factory) – vocals on "Eye for an Eye" on Soulfly's debut album
- Vincent Bennett (The Acacia Strain) - vocals on "Send Help"
- Jello Biafra – on "Biotech is Godzilla", for Sepultura's Chaos A.D.
- Ill Bill / Immortal Technique – vocals on "War Is My Destiny" on Ill Bill's The Hour of Reprisal
- Randy Blythe (Lamb of God) – vocals on "Dead Behind the Eyes" on Soulfly's Ritual
- Eric Bobo (Cypress Hill)
- Carlinhos Brown – "Ratamahatta", on Sepultura's Roots
- Rex Brown (Pantera) – bass on "Ultra Violent", on Cavalera Conspiracy's Inflikted
- Mario Caldato Jr. – producer on Soulfly's debut album
- Dino Cazares (former Brujeria, current Divine Heresy, Fear Factory and Asesino) – guest guitarist on Nailbomb's Point Blank and Soulfly's "Eye for an Eye"
- Hornsman Coyote (Eyesburn) – vocals and trombone on "Moses" from Prophecy and "Innerspirit" from Dark Ages
- Jonathan Davis (Korn) – "Lookaway" on Sepultura's Roots
- Ross Dolan (Immolation) – vocals on "Under Rapture" on Soulfly's Ritual
- Fred Durst (Limp Bizkit) – "Bleed" on Soulfly's debut album
- Dave Grohl – vocals on Probot's "Red War"
- David Ellefson – bass on Prophecy
- Dez Fafara (Coal Chamber, DevilDriver) – vocals on "Redemption of Man By God" from Enslaved by Soulfly
- Edu Falaschi - vocals on "Face of the Storm", from Vera Cruz
- Neil Fallon (Clutch) – vocals on "Ayatollah of Rock 'n' Rolla" from Savages by Soulfly
- Rhys Fulber (Front Line Assembly, Fear Factory, Delerium) – live keyboards for Nailbomb
- Jamie Hanks (I Declare War) – vocals on "Fallen" from Savages by Soulfly
- Mitch Harris (Napalm Death) – vocals on "K.C.S." from Savages by Soulfly
- Ice-T (Body Count) – performed guest vocals on “All Love Is Lost” from Body Count's album Bloodlust
- Todd Jones (Nails) – vocals on "Sodomites" from Archangel by Soulfly
- Junkie XL – guitars on the Big Sounds of the Drags album
- Sean Lennon – on "Son Song", from Soulfly's Primitive
- DJ Lethal (Limp Bizkit) – "Bleed" and "Quilombo" on Soulfly's debut album, "Lookaway" on Sepultura's Roots
- Cristian Machado (Ill Niño) – "One" on Soulfly's third album 3
- Danny Marianino (North Side Kings) – vocals on "Call to Arms" from 3 and "Defeat U" from Prophecy by Soulfly
- Roy Mayorga (former Nausea, Thorn, Medication, Soulfly and current Stone Sour drummer)
- Roger Miret (Agnostic Front) – guest vocals on "Lynch Mob" from Blunt Force Trauma by Cavalera Conspiracy
- Ivan Moody (Five Finger Death Punch) – guest vocals on "I.M.Sin" from The Wrong Side of Heaven and the Righteous Side of Hell, Volume 1 by Five Finger Death Punch
- Chino Moreno (Deftones) – guest vocalist on "Pain" from the album Primitive by Soulfly and also "First Commandment" on Soulfly's debut self-titled release; Max performed guest vocals on the Deftones song "Headup" from the album Around the Fur
- Alex Newport (Fudge Tunnel) – co-founder of Nailbomb
- Mike Patton (Faith No More, Mr. Bungle, Fantômas, Tomahawk) – "Lookaway" on Sepultura's Roots
- D. H. Peligro (Dead Kennedys) – drummer on Nailbomb's Point Blank
- Dave Peters (Throwdown) – guest vocals on "Unleash" from Conquer by Soulfly
- Greg Puciato (The Dillinger Escape Plan) – guest vocals on "Rise of the Fallen" from Omen by Soulfly
- Travis Ryan (Cattle Decapitation) – vocals on "World Scum" from Enslaved by Soulfly
- Ross Robinson – producer on Sepultura's Roots and Soulfly's debut album
- Evan Seinfeld (Biohazard) – guest bassist on Point Blank by Nailbomb
- David Silveria (ex-Korn) – additional percussion on "Ratamahatta" on Roots by Sepultura
- Corey Taylor (Slipknot, Stone Sour) – guest vocalist on "Jumpdafuckup" from the album Primitive by Soulfly
- Matt Tuck (Bullet for My Valentine) – vocals on "Repressed" by Apocalyptica
- David Vincent (Morbid Angel) – guest vocals on "Blood Fire War Hate" from Conquer by Soulfly
- Tommy Victor (Prong) – guest vocals on "Lethal Injection" from Omen by Soulfly
- Benji Webbe (Dub War, Skindred) – vocals on "Quilombo" and "Prejudice" on Soulfly's debut album and vocals on the track "Blow Away", on reissues of Soulfly
- Matt Young (King Parrot) – vocals on "Live Life Hard!" from Archangel by Soulfly

=== Bands ===
Cavalera has collaborated with the following bands:

- Sepultura
- Soulfly
- Nailbomb
- Cavalera Conspiracy
- Roadrunner United
- Fudge Tunnel
- Probot
- Apocalyptica
- Five Finger Death Punch
- Killer Be Killed
- Man Must Die
- Melechesh
- Deftones
- Jungle Rot
- Ill Bill
- Body Count
- The Acacia Strain
- Metal Allegiance
- Immolation
- Nails
- Jasta (Jamey Jasta)
- Go Ahead and Die
- Demon Hunter
- Atreyu

Cavalera appeared in The Mummy Returns in an off-camera role as the Scorpion King, providing the guttural screams for Dwayne Johnson.

On July 15, 2022, Demon Hunter released their single "Defense Mechanism" featuring Cavalera.

== Discography ==
Sepultura

- Bestial Devastation EP (1985)
- Morbid Visions (1986)
- Schizophrenia (1987)
- Beneath the Remains (1989)
- Arise (1991)
- Third World Posse EP (1993)
- Chaos A.D. (1993)
- Refuse/Resist EP (1994)
- Roots (1996)
- The Roots of Sepultura (1996)
- Blood-Rooted (1997)
- Under a Pale Grey Sky (2002)

Nailbomb

- Point Blank (1994)
- Proud to Commit Commercial Suicide (1995)

Soulfly

- Soulfly (1998)
- Tribe EP (1999)
- Primitive (2000)
- 3 (2002)
- Prophecy (2004)
- Dark Ages (2005)
- Conquer (2008)
- Omen (2010)
- Enslaved (2012)
- Savages (2013)
- Archangel (2015)
- Ritual (2018)
- Totem (2022)
- Chama (2025)

Cavalera Conspiracy

- Inflikted (2008)
- Blunt Force Trauma (2011)
- Pandemonium (2014)
- Psychosis (2017)
- Bestial Devastation (re-recorded) EP (2023)
- Morbid Visions (re-recorded) (2023)
- Schizophrenia (re-recorded) (2024)

Killer Be Killed

- Killer Be Killed (2014)
- Reluctant Hero (2020)

Go Ahead and Die

- Go Ahead and Die (2021)
- Unhealthy Mechanisms (2023)
