= Totem (Soulfly album) =

Studio album by Soulfly
- Released: August 5, 2022
- Recorded: 2021–2022
- Studio: Platinum Underground (Mesa, Arizona)
- Genres: Thrash metal; groove metal; death metal
- Length: 40:05
- Label: Nuclear Blast
- Producer: Arthur Rizk

Soulfly chronology
Ritual (2018)	Totem (2022)	Chama (2025)

Totem is the twelfth studio album by American heavy metal band Soulfly. It was released on August 5, 2022, by Nuclear Blast. It is also the first album since 2002 to not feature long running lead guitarist Marc Rizzo who parted ways with the band in 2021. The album's producer Arthur Rizk, John Powers and Chris Ulsh contributed guitar solos.

== Critical reception ==
Professional ratings
Review scores
Source	Rating
AllMusic	3.5/5 stars
Angry Metal Guy	3/5
Blabbermouth.net	8.5/10
Distorted Sound	8/10
Kerrang!	3/5
Metal Hammer	4/5 stars
Metal Injection	8/10
Record Collector	3/5 stars

Dan Slessor of Kerrang! states that "Superstition" is "an absolute beast to kick things off, and there's a pleasingly chaotic air to much of what they pack into 40 minutes".

Dom Lawson of Blabbermouth.net stated that the album "maintains the crushing heaviness of its immediate predecessors while managing to squeeze a bit of invention and perversity into the mix, too".

Matt Mills of Metal Hammer wrote that "Max Cavalera gets with the times and ramps up the aggro on Soulfly's new album Totem".

Max Heilman of Metal Injection wrote that "In true Soulfly fashion, the album culminates with a tapestry of shimmering synths, dense percussion arrangements, melodious brass and even vocoded singing—a bit of trippy weirdness to remind folks of where Soulfly's heart lies."

== Track listing ==
All tracks are written by Max Cavalera except where stated.

No.	Title	Lyrics	Length
1.	"Superstition"		3:14
2.	"Scouring the Vile"		2:51
3.	"Filth Upon Filth"		2:53
4.	"Rot in Pain"		2:47
5.	"The Damage Done"		3:58
6.	"Totem"		5:31
7.	"Ancestors"		3:09
8.	"Ecstasy of Gold"		3:36
9.	"Soulfly XII"		2:34
10.	"Spirit Animal"	Max Cavalera; Richie Cavalera	9:32
Total length:			40:05

== Personnel ==
Soulfly

- Max Cavalera – vocals, guitar
- Zyon Cavalera – drums, Brazilian percussion
- Mike Leon – bass

Additional musicians

- Arthur Rizk – lead guitar
- John Powers – guitar solo on "Ancestors", "Ecstasy of Gold"
- Chris Ulsh – guitar solo on "Spirit Animal"
- John Tardy – vocals on "Scouring the Vile"
- Hornsman Coyote – vocals on "Spirit Animal", horns on "Spirit Animal"
- Leya Cavalera – baby growl on "Spirit Animal"
- Richie Cavalera – vocals on "Spirit Animal"

Production

- Arthur Rizk – production, mixing, mastering, engineering
- John Aquilino – engineering
- John Powers – additional engineering

Artwork

- James Bousema – cover illustration, artwork

== Charts ==
Chart performance for Totem
Chart (2022)	Peak position
Australian Digital Albums (ARIA)	19
Austrian Albums (Ö3 Austria)	25
Belgian Albums (Ultratop Flanders)	187
Belgian Albums (Ultratop Wallonia)	61
German Albums (Offizielle Top 100)	17
Polish Albums (ZPAV)	36
Scottish Albums (Official Charts)	32
Swiss Albums (Schweizer Hitparade)	21
UK Album Downloads (Official Charts)	40
UK Independent Albums (Official Charts)	6
UK Rock & Metal Albums (Official Charts)	5
