= Lody Kong =

American sludge metal band

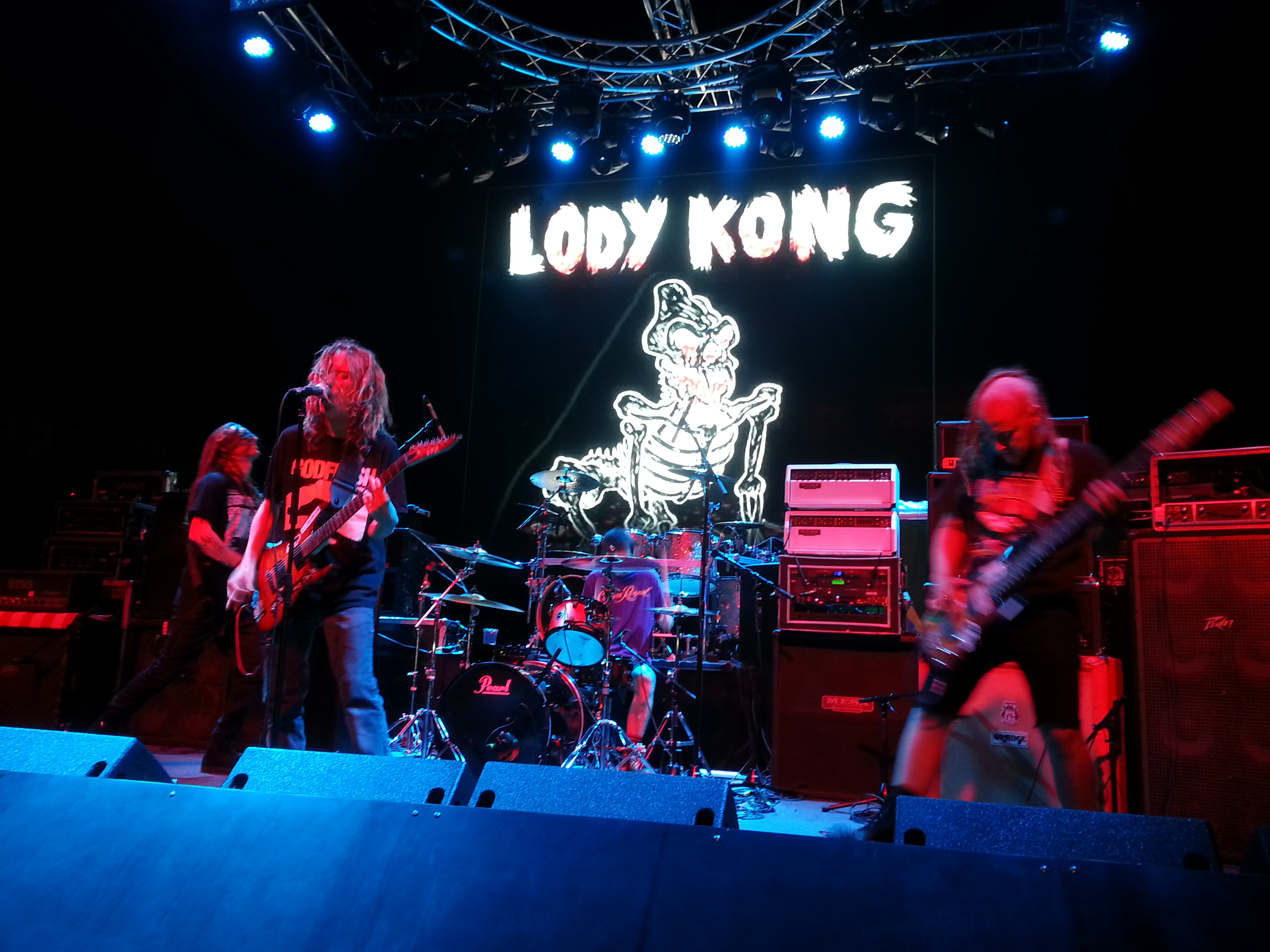
- Lody Kong performing in 2015

Background information
- Origin: Phoenix, Arizona, U.S.
- Genres: Sludge metal; grunge; hardcore punk
- Years active: 2011–2018
- Labels: Mascot
- Members: Igor A. Cavalera; Zyon Cavalera; Travis Stone
- Past members: John Bauer; Shea "Shanks" Fahey; Noah Shepherd
- Website: Lody Kong on Facebook

Lody Kong was an American sludge metal/hardcore punk band from Phoenix, Arizona, formed in 2011. The band is known for being led by brothers Igor Amadeus and Zyon Cavalera, both sons of former Sepultura and current Soulfly frontman Max Cavalera. The band released one album, Dreams and Visions in 2016, and has been inactive since 2018.

== History ==
Lody Kong formed in 2011 after the split of metalcore quintet Mold Breaker, which included Zyon and Igor on drums and guitar, respectively. Recruiting local musicians John Bauer (lead guitar) and Shea "Shanks" Fahey (bass), Igor covered vocal duties and Lody Kong began writing material, adopting their name from their friend Cody Long. In 2012 they released their first demo tracks "Rumsfield" and "Crazy Joe", and opened for Soulfly on the inaugural Maximum Cavalera Tour.

After the tour in early 2013, the quartet entered the studio with producer Roy Mayorga to record their debut EP, entitled No Rules and released digitally on December 17 via Minus Head Records, after being available on tour throughout the year (with Zyon eventually joining his father in Soulfly), along with a music video for the track "Monkeys Always Look". In 2014 they released an extra track entitled "Some Pulp", while in 2015 Igor toured on bass guitar with Soulfly after the departure of Tony Campos. News surfaced in late 2015 that the group were set to release an album in 2016 consisting of recordings made up to two years previously with producer John Gray.

In January 2016 Lody Kong announced their debut album, Dreams and Visions, will be released on March 25 worldwide via Mascot Label Group. During the 2016 Maximum Cavalera Tour they debuted new members, Travis Stone (lead guitar) and Noah Shepherd (bass). On February 26, they released a lyric video for the song "Chillin', Killin'". Shepherd left the band later in 2016 with Igor moving to vocals and bass. Since 2018 the band has been inactive, with members focussing on other projects: Zyon with Soulfly, Igor Jr with Go Ahead and Die (as Igor Amadeus Cavalera) and Travis with Pig Destroyer. Igor and Travis have also formed the stoner metal band Healing Magic, releasing their first EP in 2020.

== Musical style ==
Lody Kong's music differs greatly from the members' other projects and associated acts (such as the metalcore of Mold Breaker or groove metal of Soulfly). Critics and media have referred to the band as a mix of sludge metal, hardcore punk, grunge and thrash metal.

== Band members ==
=== Final lineup ===
- Igor Amadeus Cavalera – vocals (2011–2018), bass (2016–2018), rhythm guitar (2011–2016)
- Zyon Cavalera – drums (2011–2018)
- Travis Stone – lead and rhythm guitar (2016–2018)

=== Former members ===
- John Bauer – lead guitar (2011–2016)
- Shea "Shanks" Fahey – bass (2011–2016)
- Noah Shepherd – bass (2016)

== Discography ==
Demos

- Bird EP (2012, self-released)

Extended plays

- No Rules (2013, Minus Head Records)

Studio albums

- Dreams and Visions (2016, Mascot Label Group)
