= David Kinkade =

American drummer

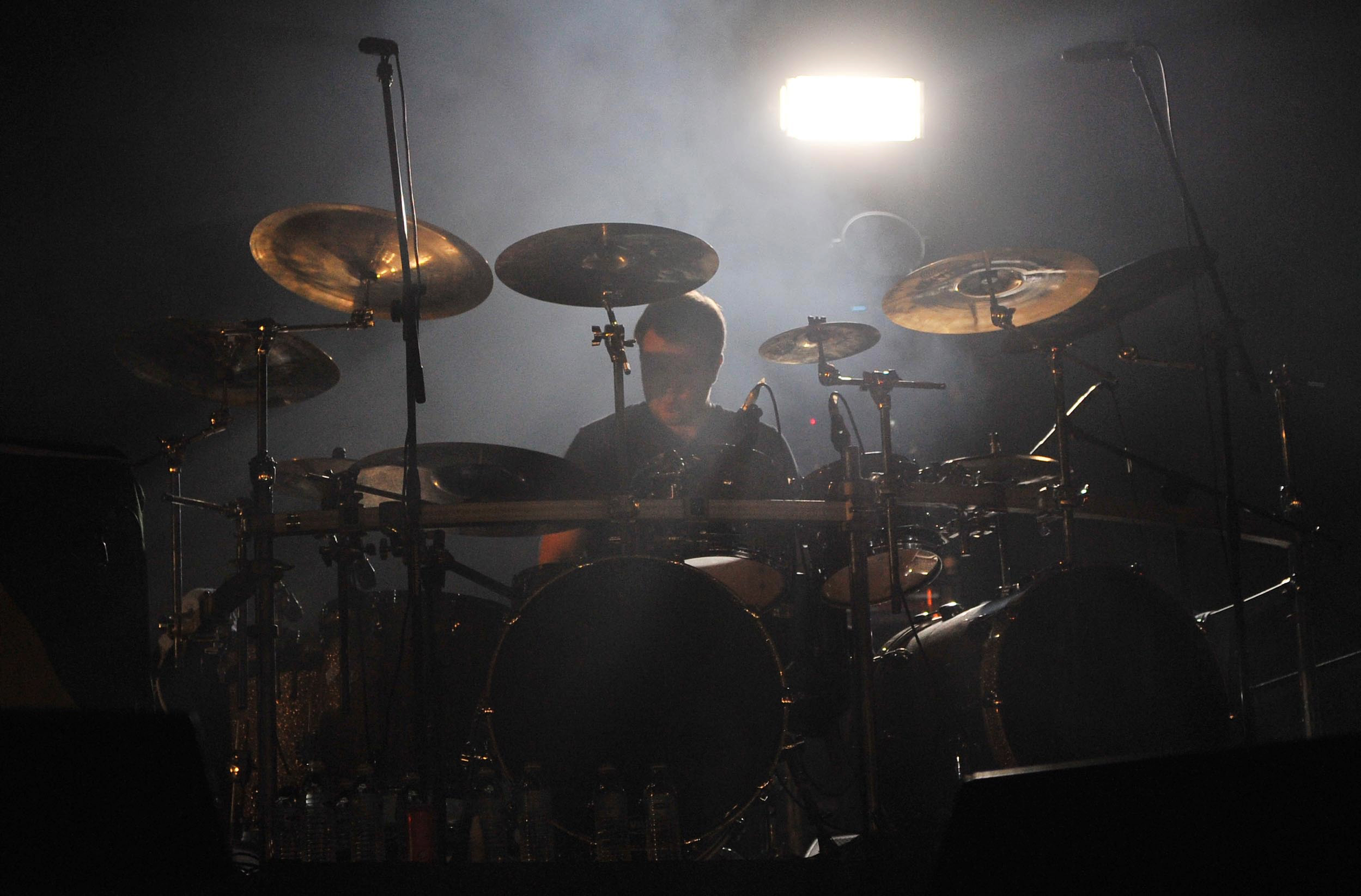
- Kinkade performing in 2012

Background information
- Birth name: David W. Kinkade
- Born: August 25, 1983 (age 41); New Jersey, U.S.
- Genres: Death metal; thrash metal; progressive metal; Viking metal; black metal; nu metal
- Occupation: Drummer
- Years active: 2003–2012, 2020–present
- Website: themonarch.org

David W. Kinkade (born August 25, 1983) is an American metal drummer.

== Biography ==
David Kinkade was born in New Jersey in 1983. At the age of three, he started picking up drums after his grandfather gave him his first drum kit.

He has become known for his hard hitting, fast drum fills and double bass.

His influences include bands such as Metallica, Slayer, Pantera, Pink Floyd, Kiss, Iron Maiden, Sepultura, Immortal, Emperor and Devin Townsend Project. His drumming influences include Lars Ulrich, Dave Lombardo, Simon Philips, Gavin Harrison, Vinnie Paul, Nick Barker, Gene Hoglan, Hellhammer, Nick Mason and of course Neil Peart.

In August 2011, he was announced as the drummer of Soulfly, replacing Joe Nuñez.

In October 2011, he parted ways with Borknagar.

In October 2012, he announced his retirement from music, leaving Soulfly after their show in Bangkok. He retired in order to focus on his family.

In 2020, Kinkade decided to return to creating music with his own band, Monarch. On his social media, he stated- "I felt as if I was just wasting my life by not making music. I'm older now, I have a child, a career. Everything is essentially great to the eye but I've sincerely missed doing what I do best- playing music. By resurrecting my own personal project that I started 20 years ago, I'm finally making it happen on my own terms and under my own rules. My back is fixed and I'm playing better than I ever have. Here we come."

Monarch independently released (digitally through Bloodblast Distribution) debut album "All The World's Pain" in February 2021.

In February 2022, Kinkade announced that his former Soulfly bandmates, Marc Rizzo and Tony Campos will join him on the next Monarch album, due in late 2022.

== Personal life ==
Aside from his drumming career, Kinkade is known for his interest in animal welfare. In 2007, he started a foundation called the "Metal 4 Pets Foundation", which stands against animal abuse. The Metal 4 Pets Foundation's goal is to unite the metal world to fight animal abuse.

He currently lives in Chicago and works as a locomotive engineer.

== Discography ==
=== With The Monarch ===
- A Moment to Lose Your Breath (full length, 2024, Godsize Records/ Art is War Records)
- All The World's Pain (full length, 2021, Independent/ Bloodblast Distribution)

=== With Soulfly ===
- Enslaved (full-length, 2012, Roadrunner Records)

=== With Borknagar ===
- Urd (full-length, 2012, Century Media Records)

=== With Council of the Fallen ===
- Sever All Negatives (EP, 2006)

== Endorsements ==
- Pearl Drums Masterworks series drums & hardware
- Sabian Cymbals HH, AAX, AA, HHX
- Axis Percussion A series longboards
- Evans drum heads
- Vater drumsticks 17 1/4" .630 Hickory- David Kinkade signature)
- Ahead Spinal Glide throne, Ahead Armor cases
