= 3 (Soulfly album) =

Studio album by Soulfly
- Released: June 25, 2002
- Studio: Chaton Studios (Phoenix, Arizona)
- Genre: Nu metal
- Length: 59:06; 78:09 (digipak)
- Label: Roadrunner
- Producer: Max Cavalera

Soulfly chronology
Primitive (2000)	3 (2002)	Prophecy (2004)

Singles from 3
- 1. "Downstroy" Released: 2002; 2. "Seek 'n' Strike" Released: 2002

3 is the third studio album by American heavy metal band Soulfly released in 2002 through Roadrunner Records. 3 has sold 195,000 copies as of March 11, 2008.

== Album information ==
The album artwork features an Om (ॐ), a spiritual icon in Indian religions. The original title for the album was Downstroy, after the opening track of the album. Max Cavalera later stated that he regretted changing the album's title.

=== Songs ===
Both of the first two tracks were the only singles released from the album, "Downstroy" and "Seek 'n' Strike."

The song "One" features guest vocals from Ill Nino’s Christian Machado and uses the title as first word of the two word clauses per line: 'One soul / One heart / One man / One truth / One tribe / One life / One God'. "L.O.T.M" (acronym for "Last of the Mohicans") is a Native American-themed metal song named after the 1826 novel of the same name. "Brasil" is a Brazilian metal song featuring berimbau, as well as percussion performed by Cavalera.

"One Nation", a cover song originally by Sacred Reich, features guitarist Wiley Arnett and drummer Greg Hall of Sacred Reich as guest musicians. "09-11-01" is a one-minute silence used for listeners to tribute to the victims of the September 11, 2001 terrorism acts on the World Trade Center.

"Tree of Pain" is a tribute to Cavalera's late stepson Dana. "Zumbi" and "Soulfly III" are world music songs.

== Reception ==
Professional ratings
Review scores
Source	Rating
AllMusic	2.5/5 stars
Alternative Press	7/10
Collector's Guide to Heavy Metal	8/10
NME	6/10
Spin	6/10

- Spin (8/02, p. 110) rated the album a 6 out of 10, stating that "There's something undeniably thrilling about an Ozzfest demagogue who champions dignity as a human right and makes a maxim like 'Faith is a weapon' his rallying cry...the band remains a hard-charging, tribal-drumming monster fierce enough to kick the bulldozers out of the rainforest....3 could be the charm for Soulfly."
- NME (6/22/02, p. 52) also rated the album a 6 out of 10 stating that "Another clench-jawed grind through seven kinds of hell...Soulfly must be the only band who can make the obligatory minute of Sept. 11th silence seem loud."
- Alternative Press (8/02, p. 67) rated the album a 7 out of 10 stating that "Streamlined and digestable...A impenitent tone is set from the start...enough to get the troops of doom marching once again."
- CMJ (6/17/02, p. 16) stated that "This one is a winner; don't miss out."

== Track listing ==
All tracks are written by Max Cavalera unless stated.

3
No.	Title	Lyrics	Music	Length
1.	"Downstroy"			4:25
2.	"Seek 'n' Strike"			4:28
3.	"Enterfaith"			4:46
4.	"One" (featuring Cristian Machado)			5:23
5.	"L.O.T.M." (Last of the Mohicans)			2:36
6.	"Brasil"			5:01
7.	"Tree of Pain" (featuring Asha Rabouin and Richie Cavalera)	Max Cavalera; Asha Rabouin; Richie Cavalera		8:20
8.	"One Nation" (Sacred Reich cover featuring Greg Hall and Wiley Arnett)	Phil Rind	Rind; Wiley Arnett	3:43
9.	"9-11-01" (silent track)			1:00
10.	"Call to Arms"		Max Cavalera; Danny Marianino	1:24
11.	"Four Elements"			4:22
12.	"Soulfly III" (instrumental)			5:02
13.	"Sangue de Bairro" (Chico Science & Nação Zumbi cover)	Chico Science; Lucio Maia; Jorge Du Peixe; Dengue	Science; Maia; Du Peixe; Dengue	2:19
14.	"Zumbi" ("Zumbi" lasts 2:37; there is silence between 2:37 and 3:14, then an untitled hidden track until 6:17)			6:17
Total length:				59:06

Japanese edition
No.	Title	Writer(s)	Length
15.	"I Will Refuse" (Pailhead cover)	Paul Barker; Al Jourgensen; Ian MacKaye; William Rieflin	4:07
Total length:			1:03:02

Limited edition digipak
No.	Title	Writer(s)	Length
16.	"Under the Sun" (Black Sabbath cover)	Ozzy Osbourne; Tony Iommi; Geezer Butler; Bill Ward	5:47
17.	"Eye for an Eye" (live at Ozzfest 2000)		4:09
18.	"Pain" (live at Ozzfest 2000)	Max Cavalera; Chino Moreno; Grady Avenell	5:01
Total length:			1:17:58

== Personnel ==
Soulfly

- Max Cavalera – lead vocals, 4-string guitar, berimbau, sitar, bass on "I Will Refuse", percussions on "Brasil"
- Marcello Dias – bass, backing vocals, audio effects, percussion, drum programming on "One", sitar on "Tree of Pain", keyboards on "Soulfly III"
- Mikey Doling – lead guitar, percussion
- Roy Mayorga – drums, percussion

Additional musicians

- Meia Noite – percussion
- Otto D'Agnolo – keyboards, additional audio effects
- John Naylor – additional programming
- Greg Hall – drums on "One Nation" and "I Will Refuse"
- Wiley Arnett – guitar on "One Nation"
- Zyon Cavalera – "Pledge of Allegiance" intro voices on "One Nation"
- Igor Cavalera – "Pledge of Allegiance" intro voices on "One Nation"
- Jade Carneal – "Pledge of Allegiance" intro voices on "One Nation"
- Noah Corona – "Pledge of Allegiance" intro voices on "One Nation"
- Isabel Adelman – "Pledge of Allegiance" intro voices on "One Nation"
- Dave Chavarri – drums on "Under the Sun"
- Joe Nunez – drums on live tracks
- Jason Rockman – vocals on "Pain (Live at Ozzfest 2000)"
- Jeff Hollinger – vocals on "Pain (Live at Ozzfest 2000)"
- Isaac Ayala – vocals on "Pain (Live at Ozzfest 2000)"

Production

- Max Cavalera – production, mixing on "Soulfly III", "Zumbi", "I Will Refuse"
- Otto D'Agnolo – engineering, mixing on "Soulfly III" and "Zumbi", production on "Under the Sun"
- Terry Date – mixing
- Jamison Weddle – assistant engineering
- Anthony Kilhoffer – assisting
- Ted Jensen – mastering
- Monte Conner – A&R
- Toby Wright – mixing on "Under the Sun"

Management

- Oasis Management – management
- Gloria Cavalera – management
- Christina Newport – management

== Charts ==
Chart (2002)	Peak position
Australian Albums (ARIA)	24
Austrian Albums (Ö3 Austria)	12
Belgian Albums (Ultratop Flanders)	27
Belgian Albums (Ultratop Wallonia)	34
Dutch Albums (Album Top 100)	44
French Albums (SNEP)	28
German Albums (Offizielle Top 100)	14
Scottish Albums (OCC)	78
Swiss Albums (Schweizer Hitparade)	76
UK Albums (OCC)	61
US Billboard 200	46
