= David Vincent (musician) =

American bassist and vocalist

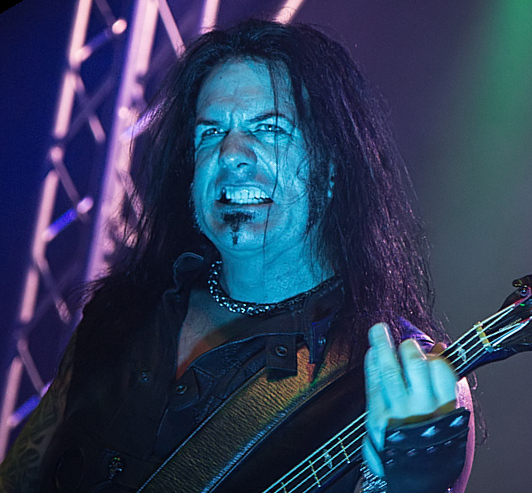
- Vincent performing in 2012

Background information
- Also known as: Evil D
- Born: David Justin Vincent; April 22, 1965 (age 61)
- Origin: Charlotte, North Carolina, U.S.
- Genres: Death metal; industrial metal; grindcore; deathgrind; country; rockabilly
- Occupation: Musician
- Instruments: Bass guitar; vocals; keyboards
- Years active: 1986–present
- Member of: I Am Morbid; Vltimas
- Formerly of: Morbid Angel; Genitorturers; The Head Cat; Terrorizer
- Website: officialdavidvincent.com

David Justin Vincent (born April 22, 1965), also known as Evil D, is an American musician who is best known as the former bassist and vocalist for the Florida death metal band Morbid Angel, as well as the former bassist for Genitorturers. He is now the bassist for Terrorizer.

Vincent's vocals are said to be among the most decipherable within the death metal genre. Loudwire stated that he "perfected the technique of shaping his brutal gutturals to add greater understanding to his lyrics."

== Biography ==
Vincent's early influences include Kiss, Alice Cooper, Black Flag, Slayer, Venom, Voivod and Black Sabbath. He typically plays bass with a pick, though he occasionally uses his fingers. Vincent produced the band's first album, Abominations of Desolation.

Vincent left Morbid Angel in 1996 to join his then-wife's industrial metal band Genitorturers. Vincent's first contribution to the band was backing vocals on the song, "House of Shame", from their major label debut 120 Days of Genitorture. Vincent rejoined Morbid Angel in 2004, and resigned in 2015. He currently performs in I Am Morbid, featuring former drummer Tim Yeung and guitarist Bill Hudson, The Head Cat and death metal supergroup VLTIMAS, alongside Flo Mounier of Cryptopsy and Rune "Blasphemer" Eriksen, formerly of Mayhem (both musicians also collaborated with Steve Tucker before, David Vincent's predecessor and successor in Morbid Angel).

Vincent also played bass on the album World Downfall by the influential grindcore band Terrorizer, with Pete Sandoval (also of Morbid Angel) and Jesse Pintado.

Vincent contributed lead vocals on the opening song, "Blood Fire War Hate", on Soulfly's 2008 album Conquer. In 2015, he collaborated with Mexican metal band Nuclear Chaos, providing lead vocals and appearing in the music video of their single "Suffocate". As of 2016, Vincent has also been performing outlaw country music and released a single, "Drinkin' With The Devil" which he performed live at SXSW in March 2017 in Austin, Texas.

Vincent's biography, I Am Morbid: Ten Lessons Learned from Extreme Metal, Outlaw Country, and the Power of Self-Determination, written with Joel McIver, was published by Jawbone Press in February 2020. The foreword to the book was written by astronomer Matt Taylor.

== Satanism and personal life ==
Vincent elaborated on his Satanism in the 2020 book Raising Hell, where he was quoted saying: "My personal beliefs are what they are. It's something that after years of study and meditation and introspection, I have my world view. It's not for everyone and with certain types of knowledge there are additional responsibilities and the only thing that I want to share is what's in my lyrics. I don't proselytize other than what I say in my lyrics. That's always been the best solution for me."

Vincent relocated from Tampa, Florida, in June 2014 to Austin, Texas, where he resides with his wife, Suzanne Penley.

== Discography ==
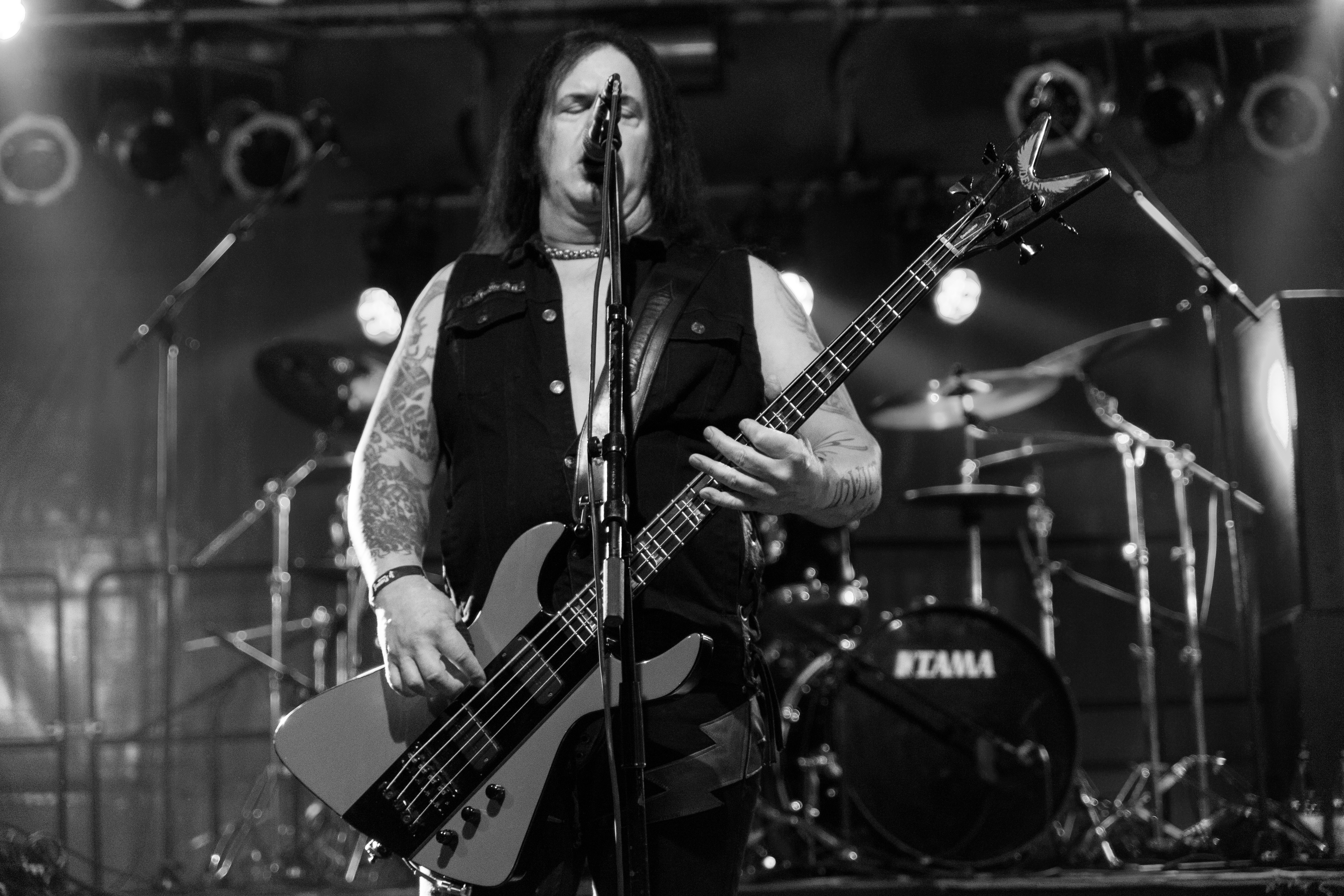
Vincent with I Am Morbid in 2018

=== Morbid Angel ===
- Abominations of Desolation (1986) (Producer)
- Altars of Madness (1989)
- Blessed are the Sick (1991)
- Covenant (1993)
- Covenant: Laibach Remixes (1994)
- Domination (1995)
- Entangled in Chaos (Live) (1996)
- Illud Divinum Insanus (2011)
- Illud Divinum Insanus: The Remixes (2012)
- Juvenilia (Live) (2015)
- The Best of Morbid Angel (2016)
- The Sickness Unleashed 1992 – Live In Bergum (2022)

=== Genitorturers ===
- 120 Days of Genitorture (1993)
- Sin City (1998)
- Machine Love (2000)
- Flesh is the Law (2002)
- Blackheart Revolution (2009)

=== Terrorizer ===
- World Downfall (1989) (Also Producer)
- Hordes of Zombies (2012)

=== Vltimas ===
- Something Wicked Marches In (2019)
- Epic (2024)

=== David Vincent ===
- Drinkin' With The Devil (2017)

=== Collaborations ===
- Acheron - Those Who Have Risen - Narration on "Final Harvest" & "Immortal Sigil" (1998)
- Karl Sanders - Saurian Meditation - Narration on "The Forbidden Path Across the Chasm of Self Realization" (2004)
- Soulfly – Conquer – Vocals on "Blood Fire War Hate" (2008)
- Nuclear Chaos – Ruins of the Future – Vocals on "Suffocate" (2015)
- Deformer – Instruments of Torture – Vocals on "Blissful Pain" & "Kill Your Leader" (2025)

== See also ==
- Florida death metal
