= Conquer (Soulfly album) =

Studio album by Soulfly
- Released: July 23, 2008 (Australia); July 29, 2008 (North America)
- Recorded: September 2007
- Studio: Porch Studio (Orlando, Florida)
- Genres: Thrash metal, death metal, alternative metal
- Length: 57:10; 71:17 (digipak)
- Label: Roadrunner
- Producer: Max Cavalera

Soulfly chronology
Dark Ages (2005)	Conquer (2008)	Omen (2010)

Singles from Conquer
- 1. "Unleash" Released: June 24, 2008; 2. "Blood Fire War Hate" Released: February 9, 2009

Alternative cover
- Special edition digipak

Conquer is the sixth album by the American heavy metal band Soulfly. It saw official release on July 23, 2008, in Australia, although the album had leaked early onto file-sharing networks. It was released on July 29, 2008, in Canada and the United States and debuted at number 66 on the U.S. Billboard 200 — Soulfly's highest Billboard peak since their 2002 release, 3.

== Production and release ==
The album was tracked by Tim C. Lau in late 2007 at The Porch Recording Studio in Orlando, Florida, and mixed by Andy Sneap in early 2008. In promotion for the album, Max Cavalera stated that he had been heavily influenced by Bolt Thrower, Napalm Death and Slayer in writing for this album, which he declared would make Dark Ages sound like a pop album.

A bonus edition of the album was released containing three bonus tracks and a DVD. The DVD features a full live concert from Warsaw, Poland and the music video for "Innerspirit" from the previous album, Dark Ages.

The album sold over 8,400 copies in the U.S. during the first week of its release.

== Songs ==
"Unleash" was the album's first single with the accompanying music video directed by Robert Sexton. This song and its video features Dave Peters of Throwdown. The second single released was Blood Fire War Hate, the first track of the album, featuring Morbid Angel vocalist David Vincent. "Touching the Void" is heavily influenced by Black Sabbath as it contains doom and sludgy riffs, with outro recorded by French dub artist Fedaya Pacha. "Warmageddon" explores war and Armageddon, hence its portmanteau.

== Critical reception ==
Professional ratings
Review scores
Source	Rating
About.com	4.5/5 stars
AllMusic	3.5/5 stars
Alt Press	4.5/5 stars
Blabbermouth.net	8/10 stars
ChartAttack	4/5 stars
Collector's Guide to Heavy Metal	8/10
Kerrang!	4/5 stars
Metal Hammer	8/10 stars
PopMatters	5/10 stars
Record Collector	4/5 stars

Conquer has thus far garnered positive reviews from most media outlets and review websites. Chad Bower of About.com calls it "outstanding", with "great musicianship and songwriting" and "new styles, sounds and experiments, which also hit the mark." Nikos Patelis of Metal Invader notes the "hardcore beatings, extreme thrash speeds and many implements of weird sounds that have nothing to do with metal" and deems the album "dark as hell". In comparison to Cavalera Conspiracy's debut earlier this year, Dominic Hemy of Planet Loud considers Conquer "tighter, heavier, more diverse, more original, and far more engaging than Inflikted".

== Track listing ==
All lyrics are written by Max Cavalera except where stated; all music is composed by Max Cavalera except where stated.

Conquer
No.	Title	Lyrics	Length
1.	"Blood Fire War Hate" (featuring David Vincent)	Max Cavalera; David Vincent	4:59
2.	"Unleash" (featuring Dave Peters)	Max Cavalera; Dave Peters	5:10
3.	"Paranoia"		5:31
4.	"Warmageddon"		5:22
5.	"Enemy Ghost"		3:02
6.	"Rough"		3:27
7.	"Fall of the Sycophants"		5:09
8.	"Doom"		4:58
9.	"For Those About to Rot"		6:47
10.	"Touching the Void"		7:25
11.	"Soulfly VI" (instrumental)		5:20
Total length:			57:10

Japan bonus tracks
No.	Title	Length
12.	"Roots Bloody Roots" (Sepultura cover; live in Poland)
13.	"Jumpdafuckup/Bring It" (live in Poland)

Special edition
No.	Title	Lyrics	Music	Length
12.	"Mypath"			4:43
13.	"Sailin' On" (Bad Brains cover)	Gary Miller; Darryl Jenifer; Paul Hudson	Gary Miller; Darryl Jenifer; Paul Hudson	4:41
14.	"The Beautiful People" (Marilyn Manson cover)	Brian Warner	Jeordie White	4:23
Total length:				71:17

iTunes bonus tracks version
No.	Title	Length
12.	"Mypath"	4:43
13.	"Sailin' On" (Bad Brains cover)	4:41
14.	"The Beautiful People" (Marilyn Manson cover)	4:23
15.	"Roots Bloody Roots" (Sepultura cover; live in Poland)	3:24
16.	"Jumpdafuckup/Bring It" (live in Poland)	4:43
Total length:		79:24

=== Bonus DVD listing ===
Live in Warsaw, Poland

1. "Prophecy"
2. "Downstroy"
3. "Seek 'n' Strike"
4. "No Hope = No Fear"
5. "Jumpdafuckup/Bring It"
6. "Living Sacrifice"
7. "Mars"
8. "Brasil"
9. "No"
10. "L.O.T.M."
11. "Porrada"
12. "Drums"
13. "Moses"
14. "Frontlines"
15. "Back to the Primitive"
16. "Eye for an Eye"

Music video

1. "Innerspirit"

== Personnel ==
Soulfly

- Max Cavalera – vocals, 4-string guitar, berimbau, sitar
- Marc Rizzo – lead guitar, flamenco guitar
- Bobby Burns – bass
- Joe Nuñez – drums, percussion

Additional musicians

- David Vincent – additional vocals on "Blood Fire War Hate"
- Dave Peters – additional vocals on "Unleash"
- Fedayi Pacha – duduk, percussion on "Touching the Void", dub outro on "For Those About to Rot"
- Jean-Pol Dub – didgeridoo on "Touching the Void"
- Tim Lau – drum programming

Production

- Max Cavalera – production
- Tim Laud productions – engineering, recording
- Tim Lau – digital editing
- Andy Sneap – mixing
- Ted Jensen – mastering
- Monte Conner – A&R
- Logan Mader – mixing on "The Beautiful People"

Management

- Gloria Cavalera – management
- Christina Stajanovic – assistant
- Bryan Roberts – assistant

Artwork

- Android Jones – artwork
- Max Cavalera – art direction
- Charles Dooher – art direction
- Mr. Scott Design Inc. – design
- Eddie Malluk – band photography
- Leo Zuletta – Soulfly logo

== Chart positions ==
Chart (2008)	Peak position
Australian Albums (ARIA)	19
Austrian Albums (Ö3 Austria)	16
Belgian Albums (Ultratop Flanders)	17
Belgian Albums (Ultratop Wallonia)	40
Dutch Albums (Album Top 100)	33
Finnish Albums (Suomen virallinen lista)	20
French Albums (SNEP)	39
German Albums (Offizielle Top 100)	15
Italian Albums (FIMI)	80
Scottish Albums (OCC)	69
Swiss Albums (Schweizer Hitparade)	19
UK Albums (OCC)	64
UK Rock Albums (OCC)	7
US Billboard 200	66
