= Blackheart Revolution =

2009 studio album by Genitorturers

Studio album by Genitorturers
- Released: November 3, 2009
- Recorded: 2006–2009
- Genres: Industrial rock, dance-metal
- Length: 41:47
- Label: Retribution Music
- Producers: Evil D; Scott Humphrey

Genitorturers chronology
Flesh is the Law (2002)	Blackheart Revolution (2009)

Professional ratings
Review scores
Source	Rating
AllMusic	3/5 stars

Blackheart Revolution is the third full-length album by American industrial rock band Genitorturers. It is the band's first studio album in eleven years.

== Track listing ==
All lyrics are written by Gen, except where noted; all music is composed by David Vincent, except where noted.

No.	Title	Lyrics	Music	Length
1.	"Revolution"	Bryce "Bizz" Bernius	Vincent, Bernius	4:33
2.	"Kabangin' All Night"			3:39
3.	"Devil In a Bottle"			3:50
4.	"Louder"	Vincent		3:46
5.	"Falling Stars"			4:01
6.	"Take It"			3:48
7.	"Confessions of a Blackheart"		James "Wally" Creer	5:12
8.	"Cum Junkies"		Scott "Jackal" Weiser, Vincent	3:57
9.	"Vampire Lover"			5:04
10.	"Tell Me"			4:02
Total length:				41:47

iTunes Bonus Track
No.	Title	Length
11.	"2 Faced Traitor (Gen-XX)" (The purchased version is 10:12, but it is mostly silence)	3:53

== Personnel ==
- Gen – lead vocals
- Evil D – bass, guitars, backing vocals, keys, programming
- Bizz – guitars, backing vocals
- Mark Prator – drums on "Louder", "Take It", & "Vampire Lover"
- Joey Letz – drums on "Devil In a Bottle", "Falling Stars", & "Tell Me"
- Angel Bartolotta – drums On "Kabangin' All Night"
