= Norwood High School (Massachusetts) =

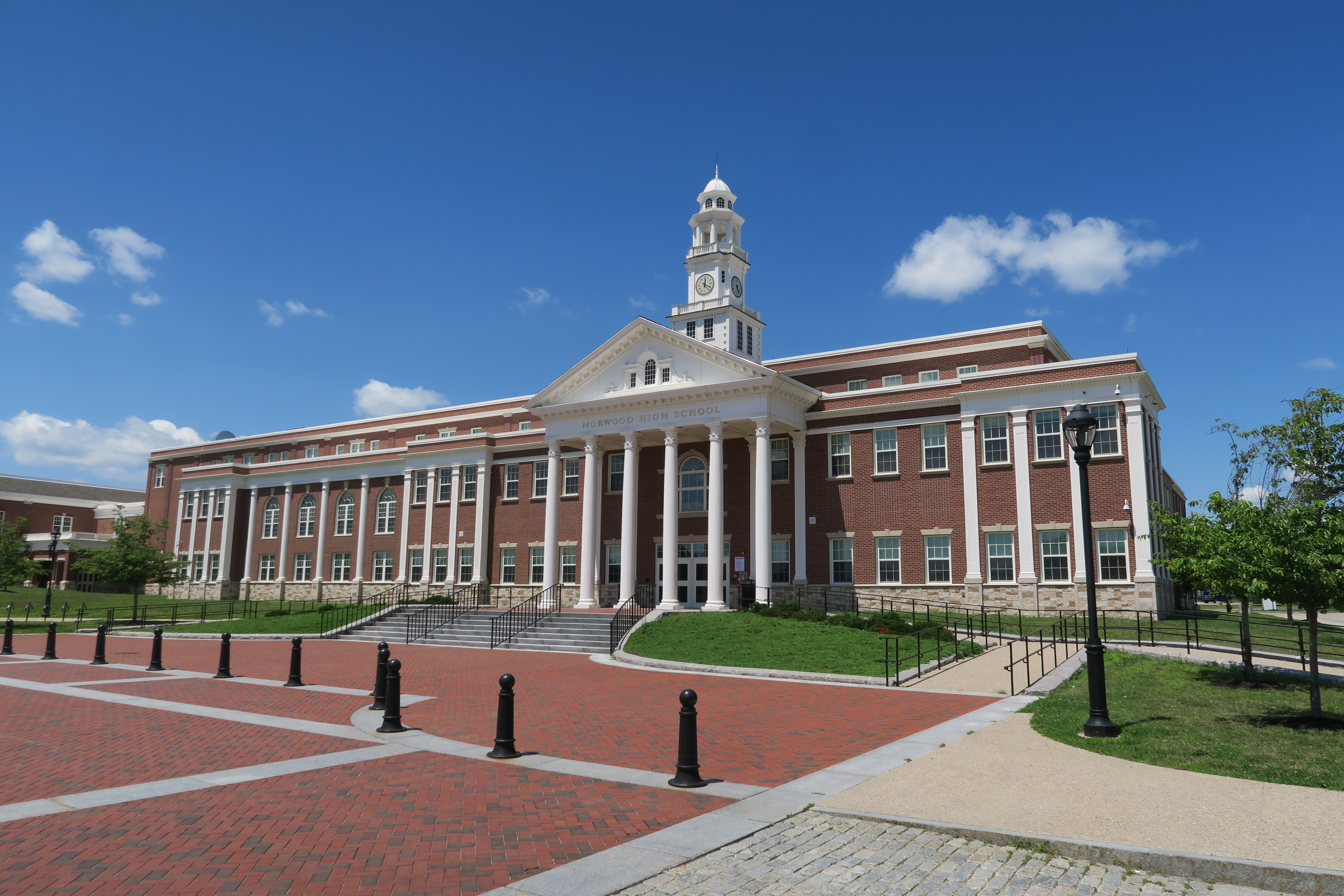
- Norwood High School

Location
- 245 Nichols Street; Norwood, Massachusetts 02062; United States; 42°11′57″N 71°12′35″W

Information
- Type: public secondary school
- Opened: 1921 (original); 2010 (current)
- School district: Norwood Public Schools
- NCES School ID: 250906001466
- Principal: Cindy Derrane
- Teaching staff: 84.0 (on FTE basis)
- Grades: 9th to 12th
- Enrollment: 966 (2024–2025)
- Student to teacher ratio: 11.5
- Campus type: Suburban
- Colors: Blue, Gold and White
- Athletics conference: Tri-Valley League
- Mascot: Mustangs
- Nickname: NHS
- Rivals: Dedham High School
- Communities served: Norwood
- Feeder schools: Coakley Middle School
- Website: www.norwood.k12.ma.us/nhs/index

Norwood High School (NHS) is a four-year public secondary school located in Norwood, Massachusetts, United States, within Norfolk County. The school is the only high school within the Norwood Public Schools district and is located at 245 Nichols Street. Norwood High School’s Principal is Cindy Derrane.

== Demographics ==
According to Massachusetts Department of Elementary and Secondary Education annual statistics, for the 2024-2025 academic year, the demographic enrollment distributions for race, gender and grade level at Norwood High School (Massachusetts) are as follows:

Total number of enrolled students: 966
Total number of full-time equivalent educators: 84.0
Therefore, the student to teacher ratio for this school is 11.5:1

Enrollment by Race/Ethnicity (2024-2025)
| Race | Enrolled Pupils* | % of District |
|---|---|---|
| African American | 128 | 13.3% |
| Asian | 40 | 4.1% |
| Hispanic | 218 | 22.6% |
| Native American | 3 | 0.3% |
| White | 546 | 56.5% |
| Native Hawaiian, Pacific Islander | 4 | 0.4% |
| Multi-Race, Non-Hispanic | 27 | 2.8% |
| Total | 966 | 100% |

* Approximate number of enrolled pupils is calculated based on total number of students in district, multiplied by reported percentage, and rounded to nearest whole student.

Enrollment by gender (2024-2025)
| Gender | Enrolled pupils | Percentage |
|---|---|---|
| Female | 505 | 52.28% |
| Male | 458 | 47.41% |
| Non-binary | 0 | 0% |
| Total | 966 | 100% |

Enrollment by Grade
| Grade | Pupils Enrolled | Percentage |
|---|---|---|
| 9 | 259 | 26.81% |
| 10 | 239 | 24.74% |
| 11 | 219 | 22.67% |
| 12 | 246 | 25.47% |
| SP* | 3 | 0.31% |
| Total | 966 | 100% |

* SP = Special Education Beyond Grade 12

== Athletics ==
The Norwood Mustangs are a member of the Tri-Valley League, a league within the Massachusetts Interscholastic Athletic Association. They have a traditional rivalry with Dedham High School and Walpole High School.

In 2016, Norwood explored a move to the Tri-Valley League, similar to Dedham's move after the 2015–16 academic year. Norwood had the second-smallest enrollment of BSC schools during the 2015-16 year with 967, less than half of the largest schools in the conference. In October 2017, Norwood's move to the TVL became official. The 2017–2018 school year was the 60th and final season for Norwood's membership in the Bay State Conference.

=== Thanksgiving Day football rivalry ===
Dedham High School began playing Norwood High School in an annual football contest in 1920. Over the years, there have been several notable incidents. In 1946, thousands of fans swarmed the field for about 20 minutes after a Norwood touchdown pass was brought back on an offensive interference penalty. During the closing minutes of the game, the crowd threw stones and other objects at the officials. The Dedham Police Department had to escort them off the field after the game.

In 1956, seven boys from Norwood High School threw bottles of blue and white paint, the school colors, through the windows of Dedham's School Department administration building to celebrate their team's win the day before. While they admitted to the paint, they denied being involved with the smashing of 22 windows at Dedham High School on Thanksgiving Day.

== Notable alumni ==
- Richie Hebner, 1966 graduate, Major League Baseball player, Pittsburgh Pirates, Detroit Tigers
- Robert Sullivan, 1979 graduate, Classical Trumpet Player, New York Philharmonic, Cleveland Orchestra, Cincinnati Symphony Orchestra and Professor of Trumpet, the University of Michigan School of Music, Theatre, and Dance
- Eric Griffin, 1992 graduate, Professional Guitarist, Murderdolls, Faster Pussycat, Genitorturers, Wednesday 13
- Gina Eosco, 1999 graduate, Director of the Weather Program Office (WPO) within the National Oceanic and Atmospheric Administration's (NOAA) Office of Oceanic and Atmospheric Research
