= Gina Eosco =

American social scientist and risk communications professional

- Education: Cornell University; University of Maryland
- Scientific career
- Fields: Meteorology Risk communication
- Workplaces: NOAA Office of Oceanic and Atmospheric Research; American Meteorological Society
- Thesis: Exploring Risk And Uncertainty Perceptions In Weather Broadcasts Using Real-Time Response To Measure Visual Effects (2015)
- Doctoral advisor: Clifford Wayne Scherer
- Other academic advisors: Bruce Voss Lewenstein; Katherine Anne McComas; Arthur T. Degaetano

Gina Marie Eosco is an American social scientist and risk communications professional specializing in social and behavioral sciences as applied to weather forecasting and hazard communication. She is the director of the Weather Program Office (WPO) within the National Oceanic and Atmospheric Administration's (NOAA) Office of Oceanic and Atmospheric Research.

== Early life and education ==
Eosco grew up in Norwood, Massachusetts, just south of Boston. She credits being around young children at her mother's home daycare—which gave her an opportunity to be around people and explain complex topics to others—combined with her interest in science, in informing her career path.

She graduated from Norwood High School, where she was a member of the National Honor Society. She completed her undergraduate education at the University of Maryland, where she graduated in 2003 with a Bachelor of Science degree in Environmental Science and Policy. While there, she participated in the university's College Park Scholars Public Leadership Program, as well as the Maryland Student Legislature (MSL), where she served as governor of the Council of State, as well as on MSL's board of directors.

Eosco received M.S. and Ph.D. degrees in weather risk communication from Cornell University, where she focused on public understanding of science as it relates to visual communication in broadcast meteorology and tropical cyclone warnings and watches.

== Career ==
Eosco began her career working for the American Meteorological Society (AMS) Policy Program in Washington, D.C. In 2019, Eosco became a federal employee, serving as the Forecasting a Continuum of Environmental Threats (FACETs) program manager in NOAA's Office of Weather and Air Quality (now WPO). She later advanced to become WPO division chief for science, technology, and society. She was named director of WPO in 2025.

In 2023, The New York Times featured Eosco in an article about how weather forecasters communicate, focusing specifically on the wording used in communicating weather and severe weather threats to the public. The article highlighted a paper Eosco coauthored for the Bulletin of the American Meteorological Society that explores the need to define message consistency within the weather community.

In addition to her full-time positions with AMS, Eosco has held various positions on AMS boards and committees, including the Board on Enterprise Communication and the Committee on Effective Communication of Weather and Climate Information.

== Honors and awards ==
Eosco is the 2018 recipient of the AMS Award for Early-Career Achievement. In 2020, she received the NOAA Research Daniel L. Albritton Outstanding Science Communicator Award. In 2023, Eosco was elected to serve a three-year term (beginning in 2024) as a member of the AMS Council.

== Personal life ==
Eosco is married and lives with her husband in Maryland. She plays the flute and prefers the term "flutist" over "flautist." She has performed with the Cornell Wind Symphony and Flutes on the Brink, a D.C.–area flute choir, with whom she performed at the 2006 National Flute Association Annual Convention.
