= Unleash (song) =

Single by Soulfly featuring Dave Peters

from the album Conquer
- Released: June 24, 2008
- Recorded: September 2007
- Genre: Groove metal; death metal
- Length: 5:10
- Label: Roadrunner
- Songwriters: Max Cavalera; Dave Peters

Soulfly singles chronology
"Frontlines" (2006)	"Unleash" (2008)	"Blood Fire War Hate" (2009)

Music video
- "Unleash" on YouTube

"Unleash" is a song by American heavy metal band Soulfly from the 2008 album Conquer. This single, along with music video, was released a month before the album's release and was the album's first of two singles. Dave Peters (member of Throwdown) is the guest vocalist, and helped Max Cavalera write lyrics prior to the recording.

== Cavalera's wishful thoughts ==
Max Cavalera quoted on the Roadrunner website about his appreciation with Dave Peters, "To work with David was a trip. The song's a full assault, and it feels really natural. It's got that uncompromising attitude." He also had wishful thoughts about this song, "It's the closest thing I've done to Pantera. Dave put some killer lyrics to the music. The fast part at the end is my favorite part on the album."

== Lyrics and composition ==
The song is about unleashing war multiple times to make the war progressively more devastating. As a result, 'unleash' is said sixteen times in the lyrics, twelve are used in verb phrases per line three times each: 'unleash war', 'unleash my wrath', 'unleash revenge', and 'unleash my hell'; the remaining four is as the lone word per line, sung right before the song ends. The lyric also features eight consecutive idioms in order: 'war after war', 'hell after hell', 'scum after scum', 'hill after hills', 'pig after pig', 'stone after stone', 'doom after doom' and 'hate after hate'.

This song utilises breakdowns, relatively uncommon in Soulfly's later work, with a lighter world music section in the middle of the song.

== Music video ==
The music video shows the members performing inside El Castillo, Chichen Itza, a Mayan pyramid. Later, tribes show up and chug to the song. In the end, a tribe picks up a bloody tissue. It was directed by Robert J. Sexton.

== Track listing ==
=== Digital Single ===
No.	Title	Length
1.	"Unleash"	5:10

=== Europe promo CD ===
No.	Title	Length
1.	"Unleash" (Clean Edit)	4:32
2.	"Unleash" (Edit)	4:32

=== Japan promo CD ===
No.	Title	Length
1.	"Unleash"

== Personnel ==
- Max Cavalera – vocals, 4-string guitar, berimbau, sitar, production
- Marc Rizzo – lead guitar, flamenco guitar
- Bobby Burns – bass
- Joe Nuñez – drums, percussion
- Dave Peters – additional vocals
- Andy Sneap – mixing
- Gloria Cavalera – management
- Christina Stajanovic – assistant
- Bryan Roberts – assistant
