= Wiegmann =

Wiegmann or Wiegman is a surname. Notable people with the surname include:

- Arend Friedrich August Wiegmann (1802–1841), German zoologist
- Arend Joachim Friedrich Wiegmann (1770–1853), German pharmacist and botanist
- Bert Wiegman (born 1952), British private equity manager
- Bettina Wiegmann (born 1971), German athlete
- Casey Wiegmann (born 1973), American football player
- Diet Wiegman (born 1944), Dutch visual artist
- Esmé Wiegman (born 1975), Dutch politician
- Fred Wiegman (1924–1968), Dutch actor and singer
- Paul Wiegmann (born 1952), Russian-American physicist and university professor
- Piet Wiegman (1885–1963), Dutch painter, graphic artist, sculptor, ceramist and puppeteer
- Rudolf Wiegmann (1804–1865), German painter, archaeologist, art historian, graphic artist and architect
- Sarina Wiegman (born 1969), Dutch footballer and football coach
