= Prescott Elementary School =

Prescott Elementary School may refer to:

- Prescott School, Oakland Unified School District, Oakland, California
- Prescott Magnet Cluster School, a Chicago Public School, Chicago, Illinois
- Prescott Elementary School, Dubuque Community School District, Dubuque, Iowa
- Prescott Community School, a former school in the Prescott Community School District, Prescott, Iowa
- C. J. Prescott Elementary School, Norwood Public Schools, Norwood, Massachusetts
- Prescott Elementary School, Lincoln Public Schools, Lincoln, Nebraska
- Prescott Elementary School, Parkrose School District, Portland, Oregon
