= Machine Love =

2000 remix album by Genitorturers

Remix album by Genitorturers
- Released: October 12, 2000
- Genre: Industrial rock
- Length: 34:45
- Label: Cleopatra

Genitorturers chronology
Sin City (1998)	Machine Love (2000)	Flesh is the Law (2002)

Professional ratings
Review scores
Source	Rating
AllMusic	2.5/5 stars

Machine Love is an album by American industrial rock band Genitorturers, consisting mainly of new mixes of songs from the previous album, Sin City.

== Track listing ==
1. "Stitch in Time" (Dave Ogilvie & Scott Humphrey mix) 3:37
2. "Touch Myself" (Dave Ogilvie & Scott Humphrey mix) – 3:21
3. "Machine Love" (Evil D & Sketchy mix) – 3:58
4. "Sin City" (KMFDM remix) – 4:32
5. "One Who Feeds" (Dave Ogilvie remix) – 4:55
6. "4 Walls Black" (Razed In Black remix) – 4:02
7. "Asphyxiate" (Interface remix) – 6:14
8. "Procession" (Dave Ogilvie mix) – 4:12

== Personnel ==
- Gen – vocals
- Evil D – bass
- Chains – guitar
- Racci Shay – drums
