= Blood Fire War Hate =

2009 song performed by Soulfly

Single by Soulfly featuring David Vincent

from the album Conquer
- Released: February 9, 2009
- Recorded: September 2007
- Length: 4:59
- Label: Roadrunner
- Songwriters: Max Cavalera; David Vincent
- Producer: Max Cavalera

Soulfly singles chronology
"Unleash" (2008)	"Blood Fire War Hate" (2009)	"Rise of the Fallen" (2010)

"Blood Fire War Hate" is a Soulfly song, released in 2009 from the 2008 album Conquer. It is the 14th single released by Soulfly and second released from that sixth studio album.

== Cavalera's excitement for this song ==
Max Cavalera commented on the Roadrunner website about this song, "I'm excited to open the record with a fast song. Usually Soulfly albums begin mid-tempo, but this reminds me of 'Beneath the Remains.' This song also has one of the biggest hooks I've ever done. I can close my eyes and picture huge festival crowds singing it. When the fast part comes in, it's just war." David Vincent, Morbid Angel frontman, is the guest that greatly satisfied Cavalera, "His screaming on that song was off the wall!"

== Lyrics ==
The lyrics explore each word of the song title, when hate fuels war involving fire resulting in blood. 'Blood, Fire, War, Hate' is repeated 36 times during the song including 18 lines in a row to start the song and 10 in a row to end it, plus the extension 'Blood Fire War Hate will never end' to end the chorus. Variations of Blood Fire War Hate are sung, such as 'Blood, Fire, Hell, Heaven', 'Blood, Fire, War, Kill', and 'Blood, Fire, War, Dust'. The song lyrics was written by Max Cavalera of Soulfly and David Vincent of Morbid Angel.

== Track listing ==
=== US promo CD ===
No.	Title	Length
1.	"Blood Fire War Hate" (Edit)	4:10
2.	"Blood Fire War Hate"	4:59

== Personnel ==
Regular

- Max Cavalera – vocals, rhythm guitar
- Marc Rizzo – lead guitar
- Bobby Burns – bass
- Joe Nuñez – drums, percussion

Guest

- David Vincent – vocals

Miscellaneous

- Max Cavalera – production, writing
- Andy Sneap – mixing
- David Vincent – co-writing
