= Prophecy (Soulfly album) =

Studio album by Soulfly
- Released: March 30, 2004
- Recorded: 2003
- Studio: The Saltmine Studio Oasis (Mesa, Arizona)
- Genre: Groove metal; thrash metal; death metal; nu metal
- Length: 56:53; 78:40 (digipak)
- Label: Roadrunner
- Producer: Max Cavalera

Soulfly chronology
3 (2002)	Prophecy (2004)	Dark Ages (2005)

Singles from Prophecy
- 1. "Prophecy" Released: February 14, 2004

Prophecy is the fourth studio album by American heavy metal band Soulfly, released in 2004. It is noteworthy for three guest artists – the completely different line-up for the album apart from leader Max Cavalera, the world music influence from a stint that Cavalera spent in Serbia, and explicit spirituality themes on the album. The album has sold over 275,000 copies.

== Lineup change ==
Cavalera recruited a whole new line-up for the Prophecy album. Joe Nunez was back behind the drum kit having worked on the Primitive album with former Ill Niño lead guitarist Marc Rizzo. There are two bassists playing as members of Soulfly on Prophecy – Megadeth's David Ellefson and Primer 55's Bobby Burns. Cavalera took this decision to have a mixture of old school metal and death metal on the album.

Max Cavalera explained on Roadrunner Records' website that he wanted to use different musicians as part of the group for each album. "This is an approach that I've wanted to do for a while. I never wanted Soulfly to be a band like Metallica, with the same four guys. On every Soulfly album, we've changed the line-up and it will probably continue that way. In order to do that, I had to start from the inside out and bring in people who caught my attention, that I had never played with before, and create this." However, with the exception of Ellefson, Soulfly retained this lineup for four consecutive studio albums, with Burns and Nunez departing following the release of Omen, in 2010.

== World music influences ==
In Sepultura, Cavalera had shown an interest in world music as shown on the 1996 Roots album featuring elements of the music of Brazil's indigenous peoples. This approach continues on the Prophecy album with Cavalera travelling to Serbia to record with traditional musicians. On the track "Moses", an explicit statement of his religious beliefs, he works with Serbian band Eyesburn and includes reggae influences. Other tracks on the album employ instruments from the Middle Ages, sheepskin bagpipes and Serbian Gypsies.

== Spirituality influences ==
On the band's website, Max Cavalera said that he founded the band "with the idea of combined sounds and spiritual beliefs."

== Critical reception ==
Professional ratings
Review scores
Source	Rating
AllMusic	4/5 stars
ARTISTdirect	4/5 stars
Blabbermouth.net	7/10
Collector's Guide to Heavy Metal	8/10
Now	3/5 Ns
Rock Hard	9/10

According to CMJ from 3/22/04 pg. 18, "[T]he tracks on Prophecy have worldly textures and a distinct vibe that furthers Soulfly's status as a fluid musical tribe." John Serba of AllMusic praised Cavalera for their most well-done album possibly since his career with Sepultura. He also praised that there are many organic influences, the album was tagged the "Bob Marley of metal." Don Kaye of Blabbermouth says this album is "a strong, if disjointed effort, yet SOULFLY itself sounds more and more like a project searching for new ground, instead of a growing and developing rock act." Vik Bansal of musicOMH noted that the album serves as testaments to legendary metal bands from the 1980s. According to Cavalera, Prophecy is dedicated "to God, the Most High", and is littered with religious art and professions of faith. Adrien Begrand of PopMatters says "Although a bit inconsistent for about half an hour in the album's second half, the magic is indeed back."

In 2005, Prophecy was ranked number 306 in Rock Hard magazine's book of The 500 Greatest Rock & Metal Albums of All Time.

== Track listing ==
All lyrics are written by Max Cavalera except where noted; all music is composed by Max Cavalera except where noted.

No.	Title	Lyrics	Music	Length
1.	"Prophecy"			3:36
2.	"Living Sacrifice"			5:04
3.	"Execution Style"			2:19
4.	"Defeat U" (with Danny Marianino)	Max Cavalera; Danny Marianino		2:10
5.	"Mars"			5:26
6.	"I Believe"			5:53
7.	"Moses" (with Eyesburn)	Max Cavalera; Nemanja Kojić	Max Cavalera; Eyesburn	7:39
8.	"Born Again Anarchist"			3:43
9.	"Porrada"			4:08
10.	"In the Meantime" (Helmet cover)	Page Hamilton	Page Hamilton	4:45
11.	"Soulfly IV" (instrumental)			6:05
12.	"Wings" (with Asha Rabouin. Hidden track "Marš na Drinu" at 5:05, written by Stanislav Binički and performed by Pearls from Vranje)			6:05
Total length:				56:53

Limited edition digipak (live at Hultsfred Festival 2001, Sweden)
No.	Title	Lyrics	Music	Length
13.	"Back to the Primitive"			4:09
14.	"No Hope = No Fear"			4:22
15.	"Spit" (Sepultura cover)		Max Cavalera; Andreas Kisser; Paulo Jr.; Igor Cavalera	2:32
16.	"Jumpdafuckup/Bring It"	Max Cavalera; Corey Taylor		4:26
17.	"The Song Remains Insane"			2:19
18.	"Roots Bloody Roots" (Sepultura cover)		Max Cavalera; Andreas Kisser; Paulo Jr.; Igor Cavalera	3:58
Total length:				78:29

Japan bonus CD
No.	Title	Length
1.	"Bring It" (Armageddon mix)	3:31
Total length:		3:31

iTunes bonus tracks
No.	Title	Length
13.	"March on River Dina"	3:21
14.	"Prophecy" (demo)	2:30
15.	"Prophecy" (live in Poland)	3:27
16.	"Seek 'n' Strike" (live in Poland)	4:14

Notes

- On some digital editions, "Wings" and "Marš na Drinu" are separated tracks, adding up to thirteen tracks.

== Personnel ==
Soulfly

- Max Cavalera – lead vocals, four-string guitar, sitar, berimbau
- Marc Rizzo – lead guitar, flamenco guitar
- Bobby Burns – bass on all tracks (except where noted)
- Joe Nunez – drums, percussion

Additional musicians

- Meia Noite – percussion
- Ljubomir Dimitrijević – kaval, gemshorn, zurla, gajde, dvojnice, bagpipes, flutes on "Execution Style", "Born Again Anarchist", "Soulfly IV"
- Danny Marianino – additional lead vocals on "Defeat U"
- Mark Pringle – backing vocals on "Defeat U"
- Asha Rabouin – lead vocals on "Wings", backing vocals on "I Believe"
- John Gray – keyboards, samples
- David Ellefson – bass on "Prophecy", "Defeat U", "Mars", "I Believe" (outro), "In the Meantime"

Additional personnel

- Max Cavalera – production
- John Gray – recording, engineering, editing
- Terry Date – mixing
- Sam Hofstedt – additional engineering
- Ted Jensen – mastering
- Monte Conner – A&R
- Gloria Cavalera – executive production

== Charts ==
Chart (2004)	Peak position
Australian Albums (ARIA)	49
Austrian Albums (Ö3 Austria)	15
Belgian Albums (Ultratop Flanders)	53
Dutch Albums (Album Top 100)	51
French Albums (SNEP)	38
German Albums (Offizielle Top 100)	24
Portuguese Albums (AFP)	27
Swiss Albums (Schweizer Hitparade)	39
US Billboard 200	82
