= Norwood Memorial Municipal Building =

- U.S. National Register of Historic Places
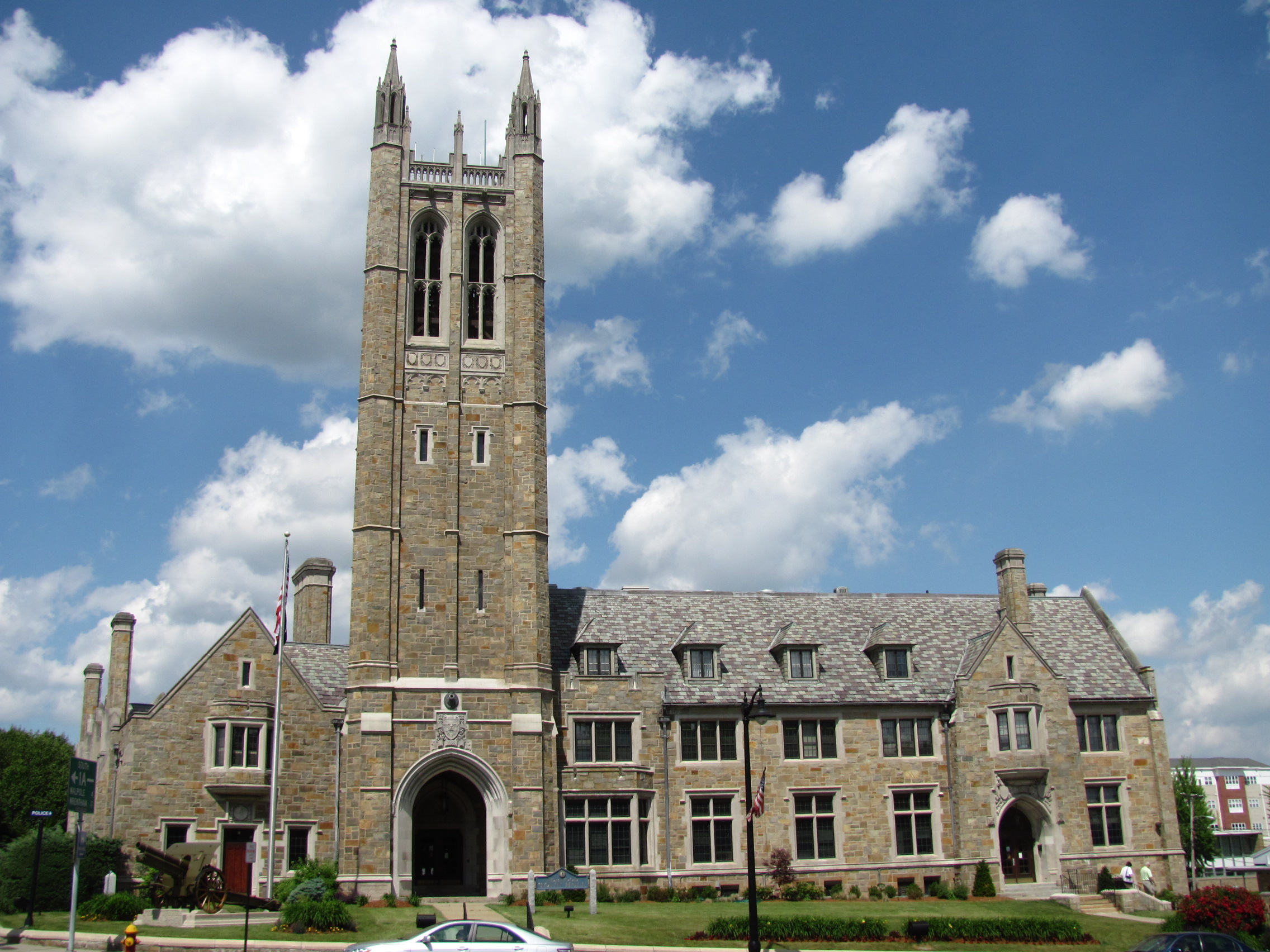
- Norwood Memorial Municipal Building

- Location within Massachusetts Location within the United States
- Location: 566 Washington Street; Norwood, Massachusetts
- Coordinates: 42°11′41″N 71°12′2″W
- Built: 1927
- Architect: Upham, William G.; Miner, Edward, et al.
- Architectural style: Late Gothic Revival
- NRHP reference No.: 96001086
- Added to NRHP: October 10, 1996

Norwood Memorial Municipal Building (Norwood Town Hall) is a historic building located in Norwood, Massachusetts, United States.

Stained-glass window in Norwood Town Hall depicting town seal.

The Late Gothic Revival building was dedicated November 11, 1928, and is made of Weymouth seamed-face granite.

The building's construction was approved May 26, 1926 at a special town meeting when Norwood's citizens unanimously voted to appropriate $265,000.

Inside the building are several brass plaques in remembrance of all veterans from Norwood.

Visitors often mistake it for a church or believe it to have been a church, but it never was; its stained-glass windows depict not saints, but local patriot Aaron Guild.

"Guild", whose name appears in local street and building names, is pronounced with a long i, like the second syllable of the word "beguiled".

Guild's significance is explained by an inscription on the Aaron Guild Memorial Stone, dedicated in 1903, which stands outside the Norwood public library. The inscription reads:

NEAR THIS SPOT
CAPT. AARON GUILD
ON APRIL 19, 1775
LEFT PLOW IN FURROW, OXEN STANDING
AND DEPARTING FOR LEXINGTON
ARRIVED IN TIME TO FIRE UPON
THE RETREATING BRITISH.

Guild and his oxen are featured in the town seal.

The building includes a 50-bell carillon tower housing the Walter F. Tilton Memorial Carillon, one of nine carillons in Massachusetts and the seventh-largest in the United States.

The building was added to the National Register of Historic Places in 1996.

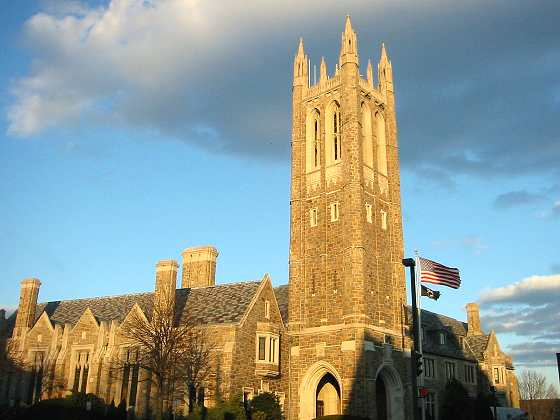
Norwood Memorial Municipal Building ("town hall")

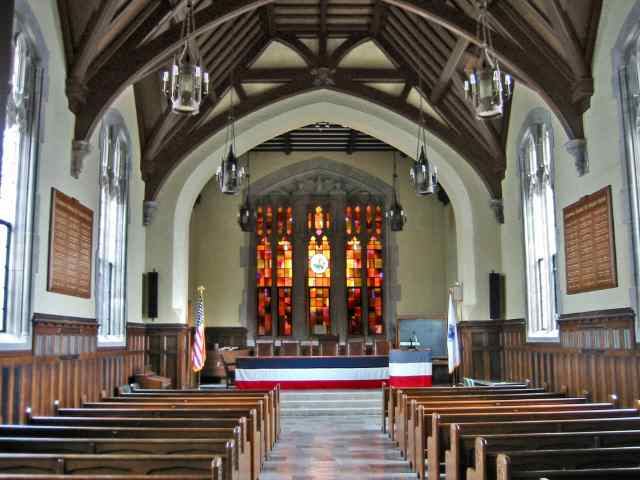
Church-like auditorium of Norwood town hall

Image of Aaron Guild on exterior of town hall

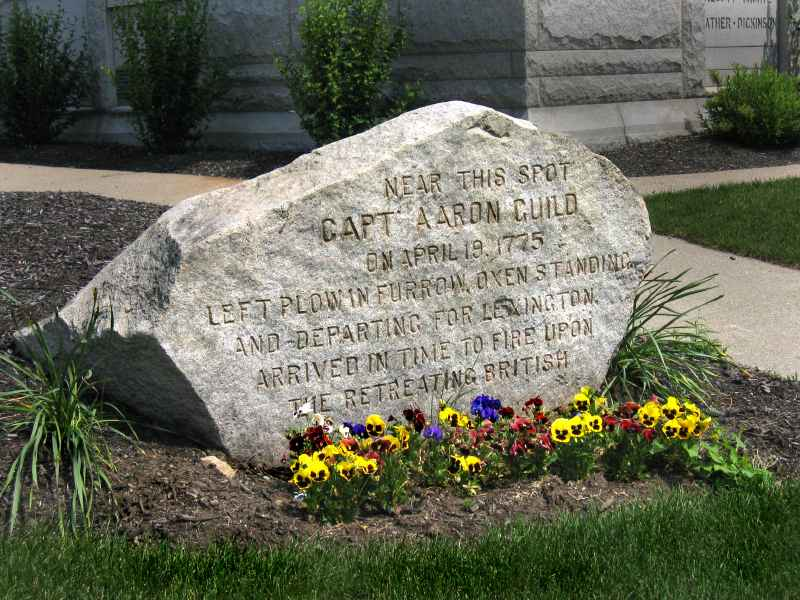
Aaron Guild Memorial Stone

== See also ==
- National Register of Historic Places listings in Norfolk County, Massachusetts
