= Nuclear Chaos =

Mexican melodic death metal band

NvcleaR (Nuclear Chaos)
- Origin: Tehuacán, Puebla, Mexico
- Genre: Melodic death metal
- Years active: 2009–2022
- Members: Anuar Solís
- Past members: Christian García; Rudy Paz; Jerónimo Chanona; Bart Chanona; Rubén Vega; Pablo Gutiérrez; Lou Alpízar; Johnny Chávez

NvcleaR (originally named Nuclear Chaos) is a Mexican melodic death metal band from Tehuacán, Puebla based in Mexico City, Mexico, founded in 2009 by guitarist and vocalist Anuar Solís, guitarist and bassist Christian García, and drummer Rudy Paz. NvcleaR's current line-up comprises only the founding member Anuar Solis.

== History ==
=== Formation, demos and Absolution (2009–2013) ===
Nuclear Chaos was formed in 2009 in Tehuacán, Puebla by guitarist and vocalist Anuar Solís, guitarist and bassist Christian García, and drummer Rudy Paz. This first formation of the band recorded the demo Ruins of the Future. Songs from this demo would later be rerecorded for their first official releases, including an EP with the same title. Due to personal and creative problems, García left the band in 2011, leading to the incorporation of guitarist Pablo Gutiérrez and bassist Jerónimo Chanona. The band recorded their debut album Absolution, released on March 2, 2013.

=== First European dates and Ruins of the Future (2014–2016) ===
On July 21, 2014, the band played for the first time Metaldays in Tolmin, Slovenia, as part of Young Forces contest. Nuclear Chaos ended as one of the five best bands, earning them a spot at MetalDays 2015's Main Stage. Later that year, Paz left the band and Bart Chanona, brother of bandmate Jerónimo Chanona, took over as drummer.

2015 saw the release of their first EP, Ruins of the Future, released on February 9. The EP consisted of rerecordings from their demo album of the same name, which included a collaboration with Morbid Angel's ex-vocalist David Vincent for "Suffocate". It was released as a double album along their debut album Absolution. A music video for "Suffocate" was released on January 10 via YouTube, which also included Vincent's participation.

On July 23, 2015, Nuclear Chaos repeated MetalDays, this time at the Main Stage on Thursday, as winners of previous year Young Forces contest. They shared stage with bands such as Arch Enemy and Crowbar. A week later they represented Mexico at Wacken Open Air Metal Battle, playing the Headbangers Stage on Wednesday, July 29.

=== Unite and Reborn Tour (2016–2018) ===
After a six-month hiatus, the band returned to stages in August 2016, meanwhile working on their second album. On August 8, the band released a music video for a new single, "Shockwave". This single, along with songs such as "Remain in the Darkness" and "Mi Guerra", the band's first approach to Spanish lyrics, were debuted during their Reborn Tour. This tour has taken the band to seven cities in nine dates across Mexico, including Force Fest in Guadalajara, Jalisco.

On March 16, 2017, the band announced Unite as their second album's title. The first single, "Remain in the Darkness", was released via YouTube on May 15.

On May 2, 2017, the band announced the departure of both Chanona brothers due to personal and professional interests. On July 17, the band presented their new lineup, with Lou Alpízar as bassist and Rubén Vega as a drummer.

On November 7, the band released the tracklist for Unite, and announced the album's release date for February, 2018. The album will feature collaborations by several Mexican metal singers, such as S7N's Mao Kanto, Here Comes The Kraken's Tts, and Driven's Mireya Mendoza. On November 21, "Ashes" was released as the second single through Summa Inferno.

On August 15, 2018, Rubén Vega decided to quit the band to focus on his other musical projects. Johnny Chávez, from the Mexican band Acrania, joins the band as a drummer.

Inside Me, Pandemic and Death Drive EP (2019–2020)

The band performed at Domination Festival in Mexico City sharing the stage with bands like Trivium, Alice Cooper, Dream Theater, Avatar, Limp Bizkit, Kiss and many others.

They released a Special Single for the festival called "Inside Me".

Due to the Covid-19 pandemic in 2020, the band decided to focus on writing music during isolation. During this time, they released the single "Doomed" inspired by the situation with lyrics exploring the idea of negligence by people not taking proper precautions against the virus.

They also released two singles from their new upcoming EP "DeathDrive": "Longinus" and "Counting Bodies Like Sheep".

”Longinus" shares the new path that the band is trying to propose with a more melodic tone and clearer vocals also with a great electronic influence.

“Counting Bodies Like Sheep" which is a cover from the rock/progressive band A Perfect Circle, is the first cover that the band has officially released.

On May 21, 2022, the band released a statement informing bassist; Lou Alpizar, drummer; Johnny Chavez, and guitarist; Pablo Guitierrez left the band due to creative and time management differences leading the band to start a full hiatus with no specific date for returning.

On May 21, 2023, the band changed their name from Nuclear Chaos to NvcleaR in all their social media platforms and Spotify.

== Members ==
=== Last lineup ===
- Anuar Solís – vocals, guitars (2009–present)

=== Former members ===
- Pablo Gutiérrez – guitars (2011– 2022)
- Lou Alpízar – bass, backing vocals (2018–2022)
- Johnny Chavez – drums (2018–2022)
- Christian García – guitars, bass (2009–2011)
- Rudy Paz – drums (2009–2014)
- Jerónimo Chanona - bass, backing vocals (2011–2017)
- Bart Chanona - drums (2014–2017)
- Ruben Vega – drums (2017–2018)

=== Touring members ===
- Johnny Chavez – drums (2017)
- Rafael Carranza – drums (2018)

== Discography ==
=== Studio albums ===
Year	Album details
2013	Absolution: Released: March 2, 2013; Label: Independent
2018	Unite: Released: February 16, 2018; Label: Independent

=== Demo albums ===
Year	Album details
2011	Ruins of the Future: Released: 2011

=== EPs ===
Year	EP details
2015	Ruins of the Future: Released: February 9, 2015; Label: Independent

=== Singles ===
Year	Song	Album
2015	"Suffocate"	Ruins of the Future
2016	"Shockwave"	Non-album single
2017	"Remain in the Darkness"	Unite
2017	"Ashes"	Unite
2020	"Doomed” ”Longinus” ”Counting Bodies Like Sheep”	DeathDrive EP

=== Music videos ===
Year	Song	Director
2015	"Suffocate"	Miguel Márquez
2016	"Shockwave"	Frank Fletcher
