= Mike Redman =

Dutch musician (born 1978)

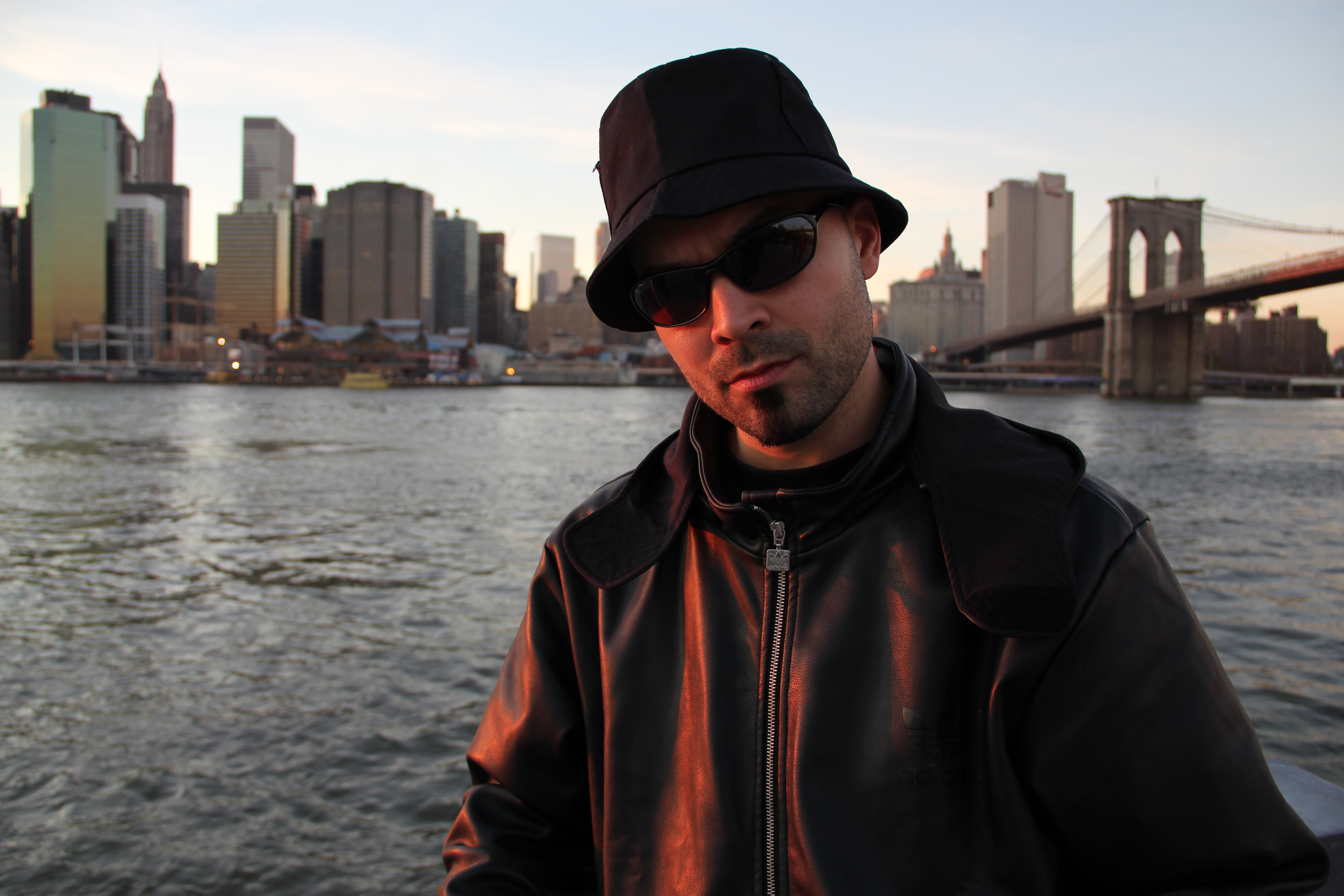
- Mike Redman in New York (2010)

Background information
- Born: 1978 (age 47–48)
- Origin: Schiedam, Netherlands
- Genres: Hardcore, rap, hip-hop, metal, drum and bass, breakcore, Jungle
- Occupations: Musician, record producer, film maker, label owner, multidisciplinary artist

Mike Redman (born 1978) is a musician, record producer, film maker, label owner and multidisciplinary artist from the Netherlands. He owns the leading record label Redrum Recordz and creates music in different musical genres (Hardcore, rap, hip-hop, metal, drum and bass, breakcore, Jungle). Redman founded groups Redrum Squad, Deformer, Wormskull and Voodoom. He has toured internationally with these acts and collaborated with renowned international artists and producers. Redman has released records with artists including American rap group Public Enemy, Hollywood producer Charles Band and Chino XL.

Redman combines his work in the music business with making films, music videos and movie soundtracks. His documentaries Anagram and Sample: Not For Sale were screened at international film festivals and received critical acclaim.

Redman has also done notable work in the field of special make-up effects for film and television and he has exhibited as an artist. He operates internationally, mostly between Europe, New York and Japan.

== Career ==
Mike Redman started making music at a young age. While growing up in Schiedam, near Rotterdam, he taught himself how to drum and made musical arrangements with the so-called 'tape-loop' recording technique.

=== Redrum ===
In the early nineties, Redman started performing as a rapper and MC in nightclubs in Rotterdam. He also performed across the Netherlands and Europe as an MC, mainly in the drum-and-bass scene. In the nineties Redman started organizing club nights in Rotterdam nightclubs and named them 'Redrum Parties'. These parties staged mostly upcoming local talents from the hardcore hip hop scene. For Redman's contributions to Rotterdam nightlife, a puppet in his likeness was exhibited at Museum Rotterdam in 2019. Redman formed a rap group called the Redrum Squad, consisting of rappers P-Mode, Unorthadox, turntablist Eni-Less and Redman himself. Redman and Eni-Less produced the works of the squad and released their first tracks in 1999. In 2003, the Redrum Squad released the single 'Enjoy' and they performed on Dutch national television. The group mainly performed in the national and international clubbing scene. The Redrum Squad came to an end in 2005, and its members started focusing on solo projects.

Redman started the independent record label Redrum Recordz in 1999. Dutch artists from several music genres (such as hiphop, jungle, drum-and-bass and metal) are attached to the label. Moreover, Redrum Recordz has worked with international artists such as Guru, Public Enemy, De La Soul, Ice-T and Big Daddy Kane. In 2005 the label reached the Dutch charts with 'Ik wil een meisje' ('I Want a Girl') by Spacekees & Terilekst. In 2011, Redrum Recordz was voted 'one of the 100 leading record labels of Belgium and the Netherlands' by Gonzo Circus Magazine.

=== Deformer and music production ===
Other than Redrum, Mike Redman was involved with many more music projects.

==== Deformer ====
In 1992 Redman started the project Deformer, a collective with several members of the Redrum Squad and Redman himself. Deformer makes progressive electronic music.

Deformer produces demos and performs in the international clubbing scene. In 2006 Deformer won a prize for Best Dance Act The group performed at various pop festivals, such as Lowlands and Outlook in Croatia. In 2008 Redman turned Deformer into a solo project occasionally inviting special guests. In the same year they released a record with American rap group Public Enemy.

In 2011, Deformer developed an audiovisual project called Videopacolypz and released an accompanying album. Videopacolypz was created with the minimal sounds of the Videopac computer of 1978.

Deformer uses a horror element in their music, live shows and cover art. Various visual artists have contributed to some of the Deformer record sleeves, including Graham Humphreys and Shintaro Kago. The cover for the maxi single Meatcleaver was banned in several countries, as it shows a monkey's head composed of pornographic images.

==== Notable music projects ====
Redman regularly works with breakcore producer Bong-Ra. Together they made several albums and started the groups Wormskull and Voodoom. As Voodoom, Redman produced the track ‘Blaka Smoko’ for the soundtrack of Q Hayashida’s Japanese manga series Dorohedoro.

In 2014 Redman collaborated with Hollywood producer and director Charles Band. Band, head of horror production company Full Moon Features and Deformer released ‘Full Moon Deformed’.

In 2015 Redman released ‘Nyctophobia’. This is a downtempo album under the alias ‘The Travel’. The cover art is made by Living Colour guitarist Vernon Reid.

In 2017 Redman produced ‘Terrorwrist’ for Public Enemy's studio album ‘Nothing is quick in the desert’

Redman also collaborated with Chino XL, A-F-R-O, Neophyte, DJ Paul Elstak and Evil Activities, N-Vitral, Rotterdam Terror Corps, FFF, Stazma, Ruby My Dear, Shaydie, Menno Gootjes, DJ Producer, Noisekick, Drokz, Akira, Sinister Souls, Living Colour and others.

=== Special Effects ===
When he was a teenager, Redman also experimented with special make-up effects in videos. In 1994, a Dutch television station made an item on the making of Redmans 30-minute horror movie Ritual of the Damned. After seeing teenage Redman, Dutch DJ Paul Elstak asked him to direct the video for his song 'Don't Leave me Alone'. The single reached a number 2 position in the Dutch charts and sold over 50,000 copies. A Dutch magazine voted 'Don't Leave Me Alone' Best Music Video of 1995. Meanwhile, Redman made the special effects for Paul Elstak's shows and various house parties. He also started working as a prop maker for Dutch television.

Between 1996 and 2000 Redman worked with the special effects and hair studio Sjoerd Didden. He was a special make-up effects specialist and made the effects for motion pictures, television series and theatrical productions, including Jackie Chan's Who Am I. In 2000 Redman left Sjoerd Didden. In the years following, he still worked as a special effects artist, most notably on the album cover for singer Anouk's record For Bitter or Worse (three times platinum) in 2009.

=== Documentaries and Television ===
In 2001 Mike Redman made the independent movie Walkmen. This full-length documentary tells the story of the hiphop culture in Rotterdam between 1979 and 2001. In the years following, Redman also made several music videos and directed a children series for Dutch television.

In 2008 Redman made his second documentary named Anagram. This film explores the work and vision of Dutch artist Diet Wiegman. There is no spoken word in the film, only a soundtrack, composed by Redman. The main focus of the movie is on the visual art. The documentary was screened at the International Film Festival Rotterdam in 2009. Redman won two international awards for Anagram: ‘Best Art Documentary 2009’ at the New York International Independent Film & Video Festival in Los Angeles and ‘Best International Director of a Short Documentary 2010’ at the NYIIFVF in New York.

In 2009 Redman made a documentary, Nighttown, about the history of a Rotterdam nightclub with the same name. That same year, he also made the music for a television series about the Rotterdam-based museum Boijmans van Beuningen.

==== Sample: Not For Sale ====
In 2012 Redman completed his most ambitious film project to date, the documentary Sample: Not For Sale. This film explores the relationship between various musical generations, focusing on the sampling culture. Due to lack of funds, Redman financed this project himself, from the camerawork to the editing process. In the film, Redman interviews various internationally well-known artists, such as Chuck D, Bootsy Collins, George Clinton, Marly Marl, KRS-One. Redman travelled between the US and Europe to approach them guerrilla style, over a period of seven years. Redman wrote a book about his experiences during the making of the film entitled The Sample Diary.

In 2013 Sample: Not For Sale was officially adopted in the musical archives of Cornell University in Ithaca, NY. The film was screened at the International Film Festival Rotterdam and it the Best Film award in the music category at the film festival in Hamburg. American magazine Wax Poetics Wax Poetics organised a screening in Brooklyn, New York in 2015. Among the crowd were renowned local producers and authors. DJ Breakbeat Lou (Ultimate Breaks and Beats) introduced the film. Wax Poetics calls Sample: Not For Sale "the most comprehensive documentary on the evolution of sampling that you will never see."

The film was never commercially released due to clearance issues for the samples used in the film. During its production, Redman already knew that the film would possibly never be released, but was determined to make an uncompromising in depth documentary that tells the uncensored story of the sampling culture. In The Sample Diary Redman states: "censorship in documentaries is like ripping out a page of a history book".

=== Art ===
Redman is involved in the international art scene as a multidisciplinary artist (interdisciplinary art, painting, video art, sculpture). He has exhibited in the Netherlands, the United States, Japan and the Caribbean.

In 2012 he made a track for the compilation CD of an art project named Songs of Charcoal. He used the alias The Travel.

Redman designs cover art for various artists, including; Bryan Fury, Anouk, Akira, Sei2ure and Bloodsphere. His designs are mostly made in an analogue fashion and vary in style for each artist.
