= Windsor Gardens station =

Railway station in Norwood, Massachusetts, US

Windsor Gardens
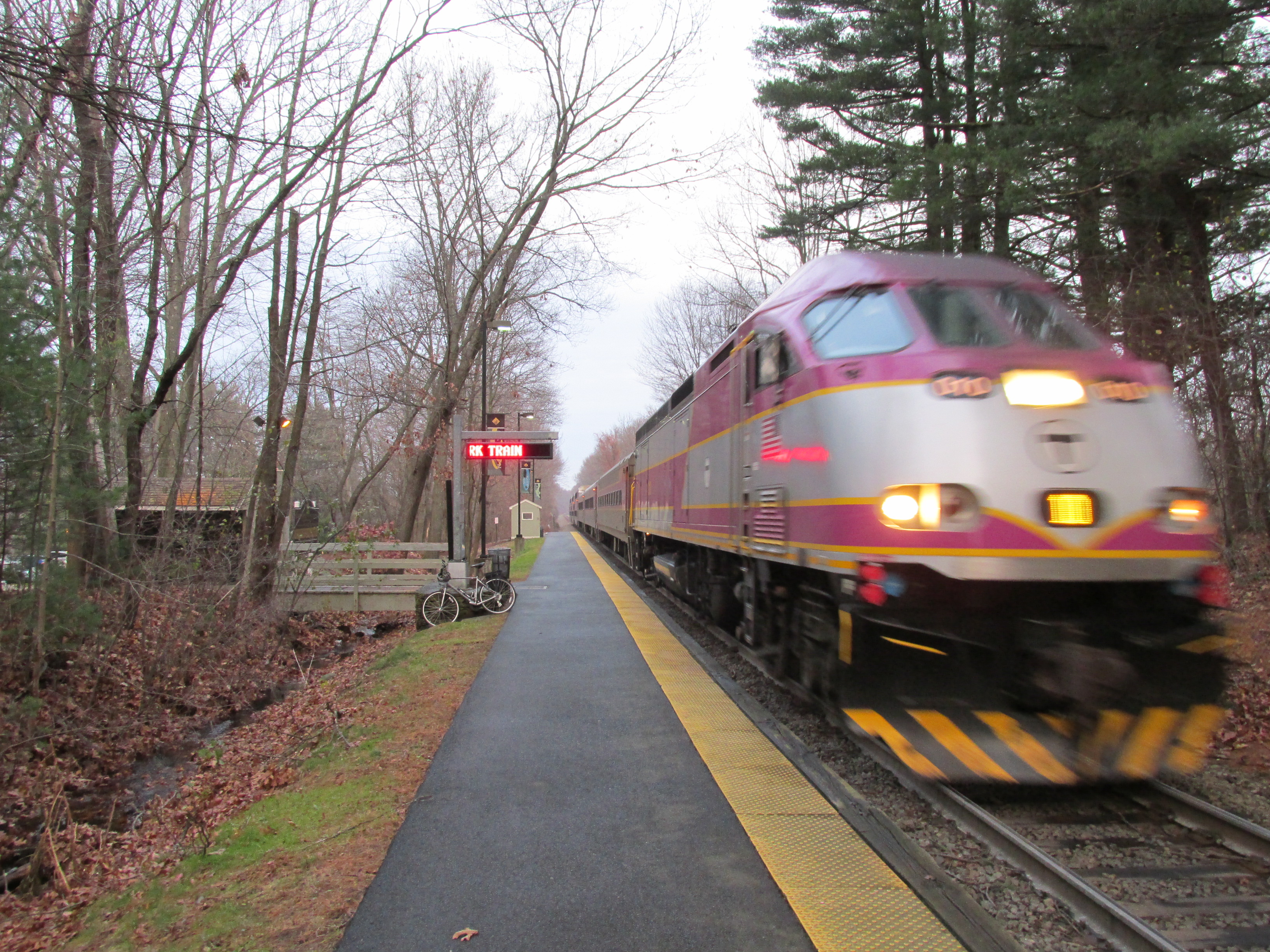
- An outbound train at Windsor Gardens station in December 2012

General information
- Location: Engamore Lane; Norwood, Massachusetts
- Coordinates: 42.17189°N 71.21973°W
- Line: Franklin Branch
- Platforms: 1 side platform
- Tracks: 1

Construction
- Accessible: No

Other information
- Fare zone: 4

History
- Opened: March 29, 1971

Passengers
- 2024: 228 daily boardings

Services
Preceding station	MBTA	Following station
Walpole toward Forge Park/495	Franklin/Foxboro Line	Norwood Central toward South Station
Foxboro Terminus	Franklin/Foxboro Line	Norwood Central toward South Station
Location

Windsor Gardens station is a Massachusetts Bay Transportation Authority (MBTA) Franklin/Foxboro Line station in southern Norwood, Massachusetts. The station has a single side platform serving a single track; it is not accessible. The only entrance to the station is from an adjacent apartment complex; use of the station is not restricted to residents of the complex, though there is no public parking.

A station serving the South Norwood area was opened on the Norfolk County Railroad in 1849, with two more added on a separate line in 1892. The three stations closed in 1938 as part of the 88 stations case. The line became part of the MBTA Commuter Rail system in the 1960s and 1970s. Windsor Gardens station opened on March 29, 1971, to serve the apartment complex, which opened in 1962.

== Station design ==
Windsor Gardens station is located in the South Norwood neighborhood of Norwood, Massachusetts, just north of the Walpole border. It is located off Engsmore Lane within the Windsor Gardens apartment complex, though use of the station is not restricted to residents. There is no public parking or bicycle facilities at the station; there is pedestrian access through the complex from Walpole Street. The station has a single side platform, about 350 feet (110 m) long, on the west side of the single track of the Franklin Branch. The low-level platform is not accessible. The station has two small shelters for passengers, but no station building.

== History ==
=== Former stations ===
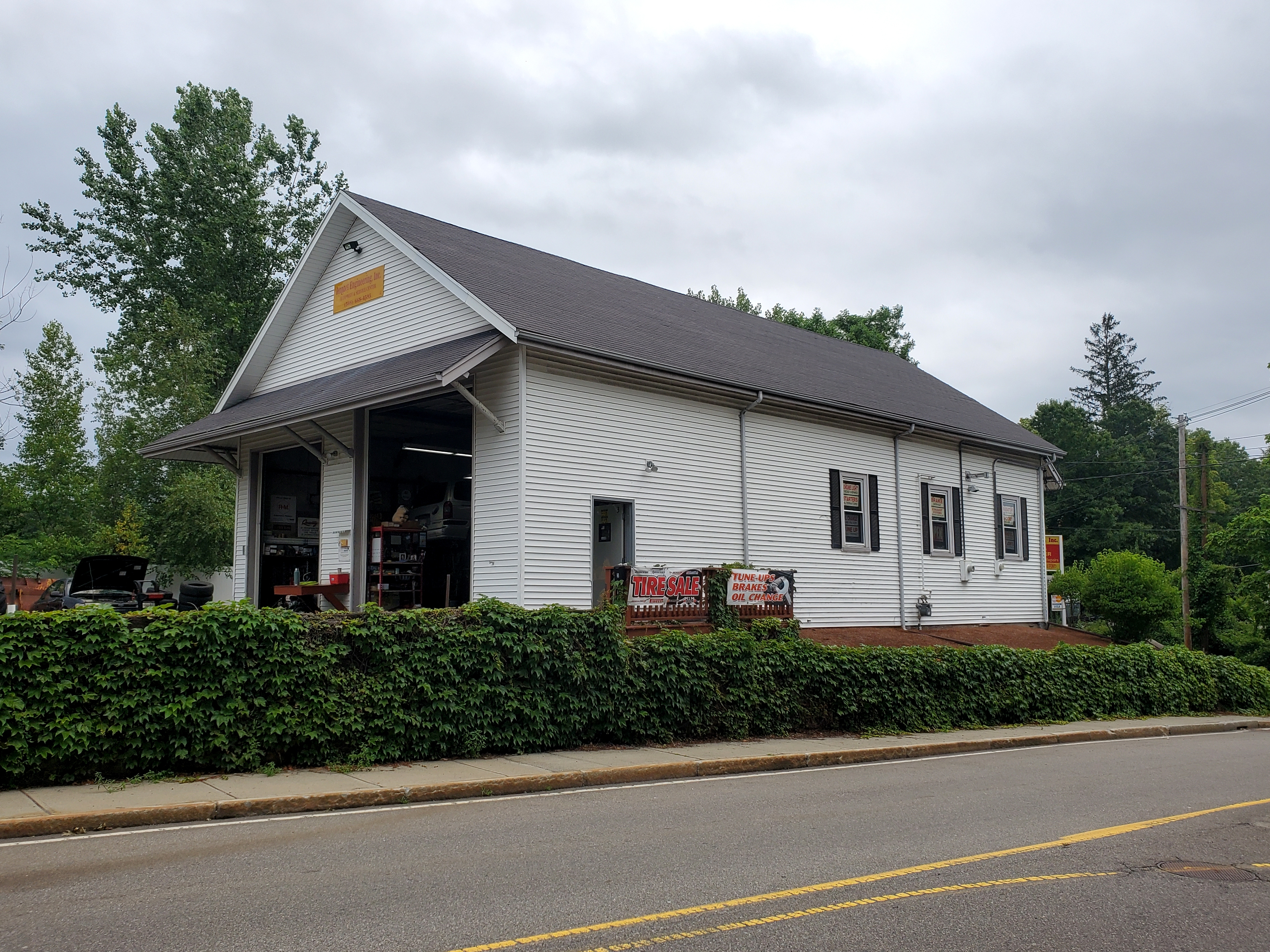
The former East Walpole freight house

The Norfolk County Railroad opened through South Dedham (now Norfolk) on April 23, 1849. Winslow(s) station (also called Durfees and South Dedham–East Walpole), located at Washington Street, opened that year. The line went through several operators in its early decades, with the New York and New England Railroad (NY&NE) taking over in 1875. The Washington Street grade crossing adjacent to the station was replaced by a railroad bridge and road underpass in 1897.

The Old Colony Railroad extended its Wrentham Branch north to Norwood Central in February 1892. Among the stations on the extension were Morrills, located at Morse Street adjacent to the George H. Morill Printing Ink Works in Norwood, and East Walpole (also called Bird Mills) at Washington Street in Walpole. The Old Colony became part of the New York, New Haven and Hartford Railroad (NYNH&H) in 1893, followed by the NY&NE (as the Midland Division) in 1898.

Winslows, Morrills, and East Walpole stations were closed on July 17, 1938, as part of the 88 stations case, which included the termination of all Wrentham Branch passenger service. This left no stations on the Midland Division between Norwood Central and Plimptonville. The three station buildings are no longer extant, though an 1890s-built freight house at East Walpole has been repurposed for commercial use.

=== Windsor Gardens ===
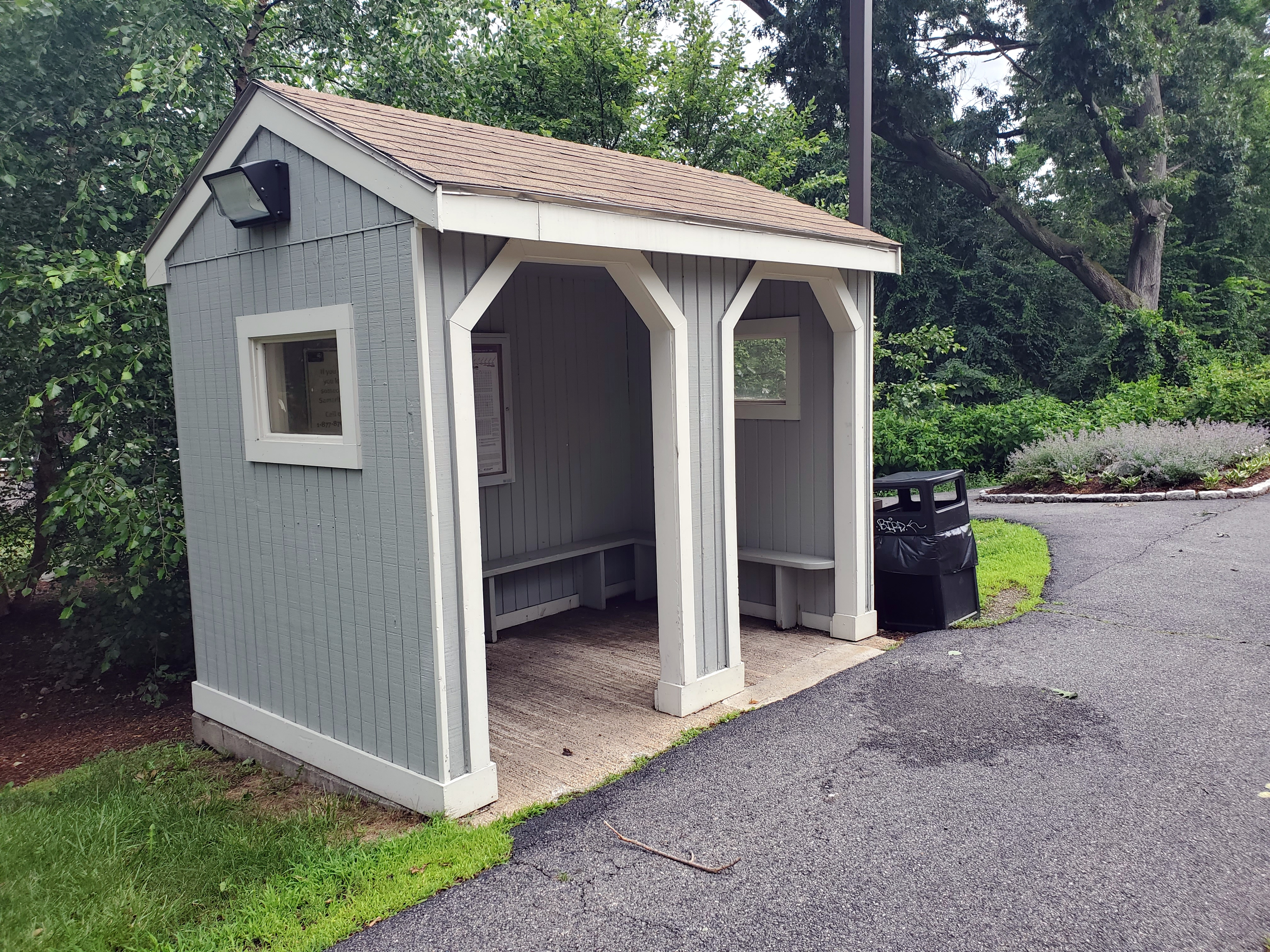
One of two shelters at the station

The Massachusetts Bay Transportation Authority (MBTA) was founded in 1964 to subsidize suburban commuter rail service. MBTA subsidies for Midland Division service began in 1966. The NYNH&H merged into Penn Central at the end of 1968. In January 1973, the MBTA purchased the Penn Central commuter rail lines; Midland Division service became the Franklin Line of the MBTA Commuter Rail system.

The first part of the 676-unit Windsor Gardens apartment complex opened in 1962. After several years of negotiations, Windsor Gardens station opened on March 29, 1971 to serve the complex. It was initially served by two daily round trips; a local official expected it to "lift a mile of traffic off the Southeast Expressway a day". The station was featured in advertisements for the complex; a promotion with free tickets was used to attract residents later in 1971.

By 1983, the station had nearly 400 daily riders. Harbor station – a similar station in Gloucester which also served a single apartment complex – was in use from 1977 to 1985 but failed to attract riders. Accessible mini-high platforms were added to several Franklin Line stations in the late 1980s and early 1990s, but Windsor Gardens was not made accessible. Windsor Gardens became a flag stop for all trains effective October 11, 2021. A planned project to double-track the line would add a second track (and possibly a second platform) at the station. As of November 2024, design work for that phase is expected to be completed in 2025. In May 2024, the MBTA listed Windsor Gardens as one of seven stations that would require "complex solutions" to be made accessible.
