= Sin City (Genitorturers album) =

1998 studio album by Genitorturers

Studio album by Genitorturers
- Released: April 7, 1998
- Studio: Audiolab Compound, Tampa, Florida
- Genre: Industrial rock; industrial metal; hard rock
- Length: 42:25
- Label: Cleopatra
- Producer: Genitorturers

Genitorturers chronology
120 Days of Genitorture (1993)	Sin City (1998)	Machine Love (2000)

Professional ratings
Review scores
Source	Rating
AllMusic	2.5/5 stars

Sin City is the second studio album by American industrial rock band Genitorturers. This is the band's first album with bassist David Vincent.

== Track listing ==
All lyrics are written by Gen, except where noted; all music is composed by Genitorturers.

No.	Title	Lyrics	Music	Length
1.	"Sin City"			3:39
2.	"Terrorvision"			4:37
3.	"Liar's Liar"			3:53
4.	"One Who Feeds"			5:22
5.	"Squealer" (AC/DC cover)	Bon Scott	Angus Young, Malcolm Young	4:37
6.	"4 Walls Black"			3:26
7.	"Asphyxiate"			4:51
8.	"Razor Cuts"			3:44
9.	"Level 3"			4:10
10.	"Crucified"			4:06
Total length:				42:25

Limited Edition bonus tracks
No.	Title	Lyrics	Music	Length
11.	"Stitch In Time"			3:38
12.	"Touch Myself" (Divinyls cover)	Chrissy Amphlett	Mark McEntee, Tom Kelly, Billy Steinberg	3:22
13.	"Machine Love"			3:52
14.	"Procession"			4:11

Bonus tracks are from the Touch Myself EP.

== Personnel ==
- Gen – vocals
- Evil D – bass
- Chains – guitars
- Racci Shay – drums
- Vinnie Saletto – keyboards
