= Dark Ages (album) =

Studio album by Soulfly
- Released: October 4, 2005
- Recorded: 2005
- Studio: The Saltmine Studio Oasis (Mesa, Arizona)
- Genres: Alternative metal, heavy metal
- Length: 66:25; 78:29 (digipak)
- Label: Roadrunner
- Producer: Max Cavalera

Soulfly chronology
Prophecy (2004)	Dark Ages (2005)	Conquer (2008)

Singles from Dark Ages
- 1. "Carved Inside" Released: September 25, 2005; 2. "Frontlines" Released: February 7, 2006

Dark Ages is the fifth album by the American heavy metal band Soulfly. It was released on October 4, 2005.

== Album information ==
The album explores aggression and dark themes to mourn the deaths of Max Cavalera's 8-month-old grandson, Moses, and his close friend Dimebag Darrell. Dark Ages was recorded in five countries – Serbia, Turkey, Russia, France, and the United States. Cavalera praised this album by calling it "unorthodox metal".

=== Songs ===
The album opens with an intro track "The Dark Ages", which continues into "Babylon", which explores worldwide chaos. "Arise Again" combines Metallica-like riffs and Sepultura-like echoes.

"Corrosion Creeps" is dedicated to Chuck Schuldiner of Death. "Fuel the Hate" begins with the lyric line 'Monday, July 16, 1945, 5:30am', exact time and date when 'Trinity' nuclear test occurred. It was around this time that the lyrical themes began to move away from the earlier spiritual themes and began incorporating more violent and aggressive elements. Richie Cavalera, Max's son, co-sings on "Staystrong" as a tribute to youthful deaths of Moses and Dana.

The outro for "Bleak" was recorded in an ancient temple in Istanbul to capture echoes to include as common sound effect on this album. "Molotov" lyrics are in Russian, Portuguese, and a final verse in English. The performance of Billy Milano, one of two guests for "Molotov", was recorded over the phone by Max. "Riotstarter" contains strong tribal chants, and "Innerspirit" blends clean and melodic vocals by the guest Coyote over the roars by Cavalera.

== Reception ==
Professional ratings
Review scores
Source	Rating
AllMusic	4/5 stars
Blabbermouth.net	8/10
Blogcritics	9/10 stars
Collector's Guide to Heavy Metal	7/10

AllMusic had a positive response, because the album has greater complexity of metal than any of the previous albums, thus refreshing the band with veterans present. Blogcritics had a very good response, as "Cavalera is screaming louder and harder than ever throughout. He's raging harder and in a higher range than he's been in years, and it's a welcome improvement."

== Track listing ==
All lyrics are written by Max Cavalera except where stated; all music is composed by Max Cavalera.

No.	Title	Lyrics	Length
1.	"The Dark Ages"		0:48
2.	"Babylon"		3:53
3.	"I and I"		3:15
4.	"Carved Inside"		3:35
5.	"Arise Again"		4:10
6.	"Molotov" (featuring Paul Fillipenko and Billy Milano)	Max Cavalera; Pavel Fillipenko; Billy Milano	1:58
7.	"Frontlines"		4:34
8.	"Innerspirit" (featuring Nemanja "Coyote" Kojić)	Max Cavalera; Nemanja Kojić; Bojan Stojanovic	5:15
9.	"Corrosion Creeps"		4:27
10.	"Riotstarter" (featuring David Ellefson)		5:00
11.	"Bleak"		4:57
12.	"(The) March"		1:19
13.	"Fuel the Hate"		4:12
14.	"Staystrong" (featuring Richie Cavalera)	Max Cavalera; Richie Cavalera	8:14
15.	"Soulfly V" (instrumental) (includes an untitled hidden track at 7:15)		10:54
Total length:			66:25

Japanese and limited edition digipak
No.	Title	Lyrics	Length
16.	"Salmo-91"	(taken from Psalm 91)	4:24
17.	"Prophecy" (live at Metalmania 2004)		3:27
18.	"Seek 'n' Strike" (live at Metalmania 2004)		4:15
Total length:			78:29

== Personnel ==
Soulfly

- Max Cavalera – vocals, 4-string guitar, berimbau, sitar, didgeridoo
- Marc Rizzo – lead guitar, flamenco guitar
- Bobby Burns – bass
- Joe Nunez – drums, percussion

Additional musicians

- Nemanja "Coyote" Kojić – vocals on "Innerspirit"
- Pavel Fillipenko – vocals on "Molotov"
- Billy Milano – vocals on "Molotov"
- David Ellefson – bass on "Riotstarter"
- Richie Cavalera – vocals on "Staystrong"
- Stefane Goldman – sitar, mandolin, acoustic guitar, keyboards
- Alexander Yushin – bayan
- Alexsander Hrenov – balalaika, wooden spoons, treshchotka
- Vitaly Hrenov – contrabass balalaika
- John Gray – synth programming

Production

- Max Cavalera – production
- John Gray – recording, engineering, digital editing, mixing on "Molotov" and "(The) March", additional mixing on "Soulfly V"
- John Bilberry – assistant engineering
- Matt Marksbary – assistant engineering
- Justin Salter – assistant engineering
- Terry Date – mixing
- June Murakawa – assisting
- Milan "Bare" Barković – engineering
- Alexkid – engineering
- Darya Jubenko – engineering
- Gloria Cavalera – executive production
- Ted Jensen – mastering
- Monte Conner – A&R

Management

- Gloria Cavalera – management
- Christina Stojanovic – management

Artwork

- Michael Whelan – illustrations
- Mr. Scott Design – art direction
- Leo Zuletta – Soulfly logo

== Chart positions ==
Chart (2000)	Peak position
Australian Albums (ARIA)	41
Austrian Albums (Ö3 Austria)	19
Belgian Albums (Ultratop Flanders)	64
Dutch Albums (Album Top 100)	68
French Albums (SNEP)	49
German Albums (Offizielle Top 100)	29
Italian Albums (FIMI)	91
Swedish Albums (Sverigetopplistan)	54
Swiss Albums (Schweizer Hitparade)	44
US Billboard 200	155
