= Deformer =

- Origin: Rotterdam, Netherlands
- Genres: Hardcore, metal, drum and bass, breakcore, jungle
- Years active: 1995–present

Deformer is a music project led by Dutch music producer Mike Redman since the early nineties. They were amongst the first generation of Jungle producers in the Netherlands and are known for merging different music genres that would later be described as Breakcore. They pioneered with using Sranan Tongo in their Jungle productions as well as primarily using Gabber sounds. Their experimental electronic (dance) music is often Horror influenced.

== Career ==
Deformer first started producing tracks under the name FXecute. In 1995 they changed their name to Deformer. All tracks during that period were produced on Amiga 2000 and Atari computers using Akai S950 samplers. Jungle, Breakbeat and Rave music were primary and samples from cult and obscure horror films were used to create a rather dark atmosphere which became a Deformer signature. To create a unique sound within Jungle music production, Deformer mostly avoided to use the famous ‘Amen Break’ and Mike Redman recorded his own live drums which he later sampled in a similar tradition. Deformer performed in underground clubs, creating a buzz in the alternative dance scene after the mid nineties.

In 1999 that some of their tracks were officially released. Their debut ‘FXecutioners’, released on Mike Redman’s independent record label Redrum Recordz received critical acclaim. It was a mixture between jungle, progressive drum and bass and dark trip hop. Around 2000 Redman asked members of the Rap group Redrum Squad to take part during the live performances of Deformer. Turntablist Eni-Less, MC P-Mode and DJ Mack completed the line up accompanied by mostly two dancers they call ‘Freaqks‘ and occasional guest artists. The Deformer live shows were very horror influenced. During the bigger live shows the Freaqks would often spray fake blood into the audience, dance with prosthetics like chopped off heads and the stage would be decorated with fake corpses. Deformer also used a giant gorilla prop on stage with a person in it to move it across the stage. The show element was of great importance and no other act within their field has previously done such a thing. Deformer were resident during the popular ‘Illy Noiz’ Drum and Bass parties in Rotterdam led by DJ Mack.

Hailing from Rotterdam city Deformer integrated the local Gabber sound to their formula and the track "Slasher" became a blueprint for future productions. The sound was different at the time and during that period the artwork for Drum and Bass records was usually very clean and mostly consisted of abstract computer graphics. Deformer took an opposite approach and made record sleeves that would more easily be associated with the artwork of Death Metal records. The cover for the maxi single "Meatcleaver" was banned in several countries; it shows a monkey’s head composed of pornographic images. Due to the unorthodox record sleeves Deformer often failed to reach the more mainstream audience that buy Drum and bass records. Deformer is known for going against the grain and also like to induct hidden messages in their recordings and artwork. For example, in their 2005 album Revolution Theory there is a hidden track before position 1 on the CD. This can only be found when rewinded in an external CD player. "Meatcleaver" has reversed speech in the track, the artwork contains almost unrecognizable pop icons.

The Deformer logo is a monkey with six arms. Inspired by the Asian ‘three wise monkeys’ proverb. Where the monkeys originally cover their eyes, ears and mouth (see no evil, hear no evil, speak no evil) Deformer’s monkey accents the eyes, ears and mouth distorting the proverb to ‘See, hear, scream!’ combining the three wise monkeys into one furious ape.

In 2006 Deformer won a prize for Best Dance Act and in 2008 they released a record with Rap group Public Enemy. They collaborated with DJ Starscream (Slipknot), 6Blocc and Heavy metal band Living Colour. They performed at renowned festivals like; Lowlands and Outlook. Deformer shared the stage with sounding names like: Amon Tobin, Venetian Snares, Andy C, Technical Itch and many others. In 2009 Deformer introduced the subgenre ‘Defcore’ with the track ‘Extreme Deformity’, a mixture of Dubstep and Gabber. In 2011, they developed an audiovisual project called ‘Videopacolypz’ and released an accompanying album. Videopacolypz was created with the minimal sounds coming from the Videopac game console that was originally released in 1978. Mike Redman has previously collaborated with Dutch Breakcore producer Bong-Ra on his acclaimed ‘Bikini Bandits Kill Kill Kill’ album, but in 2011 Deformer and Bong-Ra joined forces and founded the group Wormskull. They released the album entitled ‘Sound of Hell’ on German record label Ad Noiseam the same year. The band Wormskull, with Balázs Pándi on drums, combines live music with electronica and like Deformer, uses obscure cult, horror and exploitation film samples.

Deformer currently consists of just Mike Redman and occasional guest artists during live shows. Redman usually wears a deformed mask during the performances. In 2012 ‘Hybrid’ was released on PRSPCT Recordings. In 2014 Redman collaborated with American Horror-icon, director and producer Charles Band, founder of film company Full Moon Features. They produced the album ‘Full Moon Deformed’. Deformer still performs on an international basis.
