= Norwood Public Schools =

School district in Massachusetts, USA

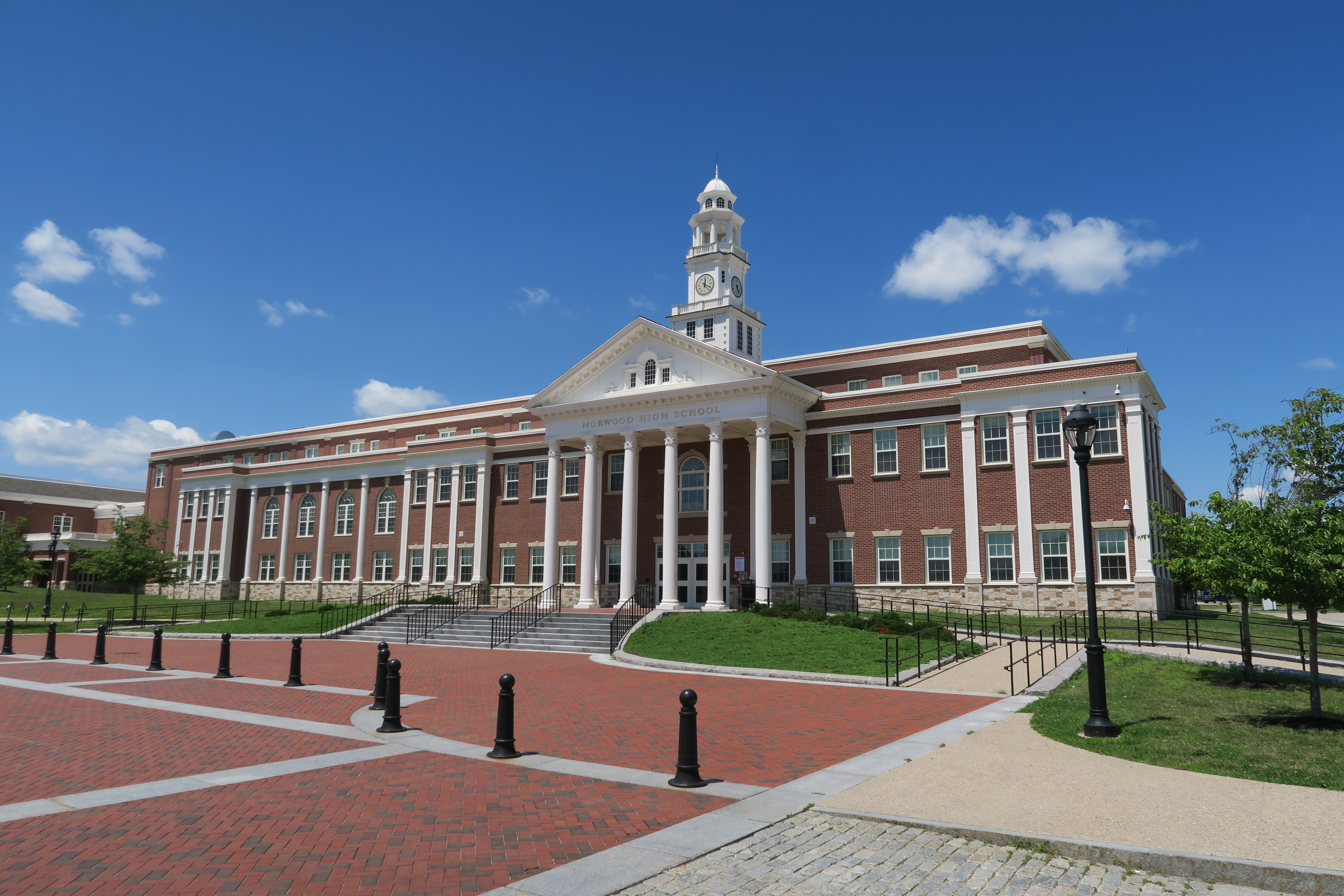
Norwood High School

Norwood Public Schools is a school district headquartered in Norwood, Massachusetts.

== Schools ==
Secondary:

- Norwood High School
- Dr. Philip O. Coakley Middle School (formerly Norwood Junior High South)

Elementary:

- Balch
- Callahan
- Cleveland
- Oldham
- C.J. Prescott

Preschool:

- Willett Early Childhood Center (serves preschool and kindergarten children).
