= 120 Days of Genitorture =

1993 studio album by Genitorturers

Studio album by Genitorturers
- Released: May 18, 1993
- Studios: Wolfhead Studio, Altamonte Springs, Florida
- Genres: Industrial metal; industrial rock
- Length: 42:56
- Labels: I.R.S.; Shock Therapy
- Producers: Nick Turner; Gen

Genitorturers chronology
120 Days of Genitorture (1993)	Sin City (1998)

Professional ratings
Review scores
Source	Rating
AllMusic	3/5 stars

120 Days of Genitorture is the debut album of American industrial metal/industrial rock band Genitorturers. The title is a reference to the book 120 Days of Sodom, by the Marquis de Sade.

== Track listing ==
All lyrics are written by Gen; all music is composed by Genitorturers.

No.	Title	Length
1.	"120 Days"	4:48
2.	"Reality Check"	4:23
3.	"Velvet Dreams"	6:23
4.	"House of Shame"	3:26
5.	"Pleasure in Restraint"	6:50
6.	"Lesser Gods"	4:25
7.	"Jackin' Man"	2:42
8.	"River's Edge/Strip the Flesh"	4:29
9.	"Force Fed"	3:09
10.	"Crack Track"	2:21

== Personnel ==
Genitorturers

- Gen – vocals, producer
- Jerry Outlaw – guitars
- Sean Colpoys – bass
- AW Reckart – drums

Additional

- Nick Turner – producer
- Dave "Rave" Ogilvie – mixing (tracks 1 to 6, 8)
- Dean Maher – mixing (tracks 7, 9, 10)
- Ken Marshall – mixing (tracks 7, 9, 10)
- Tom Baker – mastering
- Marty Ogden – engineer
- Dein R. – samples
- Justin Greathouse – samples
- Hugh Brown – art direction
- Gary Mark Allen – photography
- George Holz – photography
