= Genitorturers =

American industrial metal band

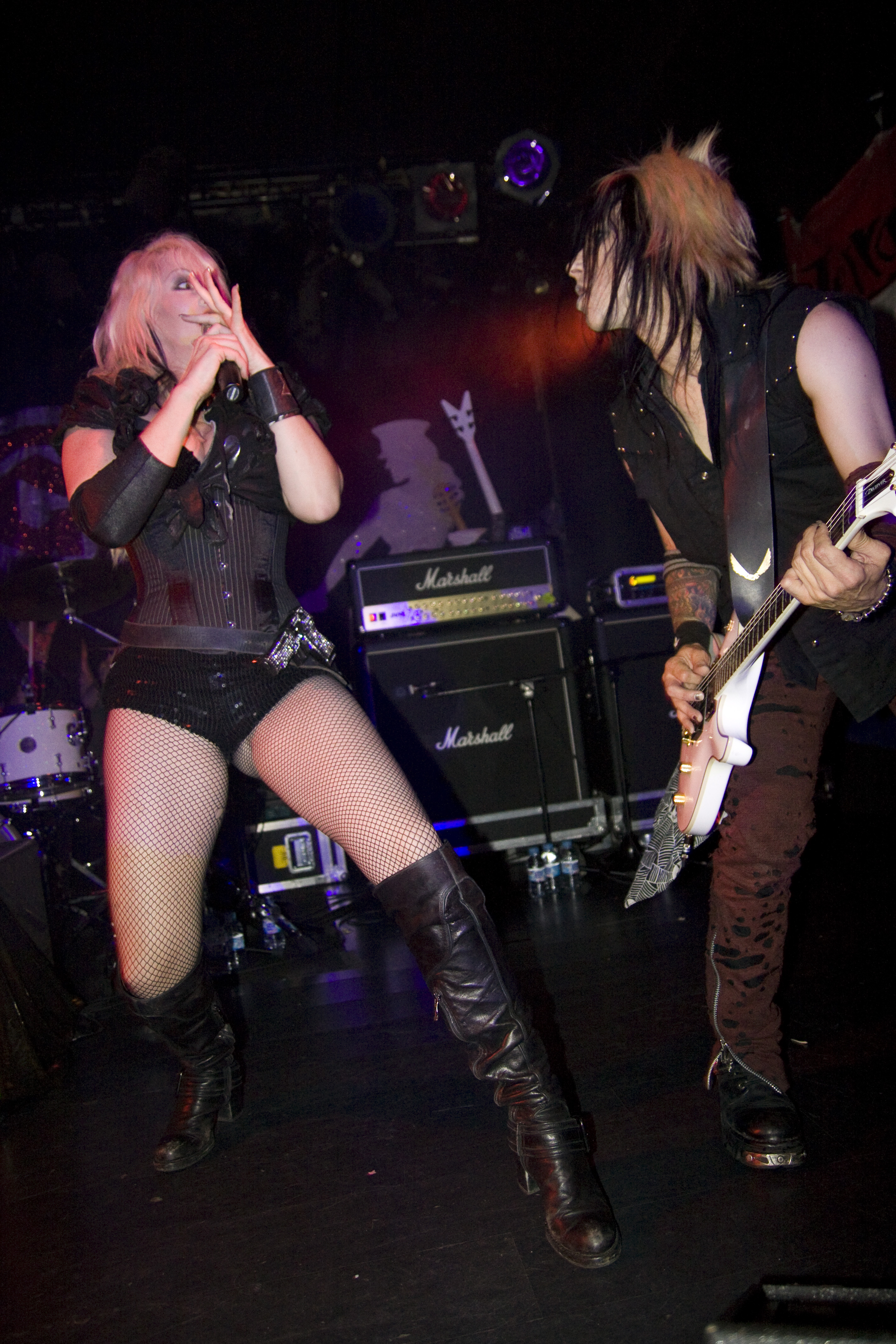
- Gen Vincent & Eric Griffin in 2010

Background information
- Origin: Orlando, Florida, U.S.
- Genres: Industrial rock, industrial metal
- Years active: 1986–present
- Labels: Capitol, Cleopatra, Retribution
- Members: Gen; Eric Griffin; Kriz D.K. Ilyn Nathaniel
- Past members: Paweł Mąciwoda; David Vincent; Angel Bartolotta; Bizz; Joe Letz; Ryan Seelbach; Abbey Nex
- Website: genitorturers.com

The Genitorturers are an American industrial metal band, based out of Tampa, Florida, with influences extending into the 1990s hardcore punk and electronic music. They proclaim themselves to be "The World's Sexiest Rock Band".

== History ==
Originating in Orlando, Florida, the band was founded by lead singer Jennifer "Gen" Zimmerman while attending Rollins college. Originally called The Festering Genitorturers, the band consisted of Gen herself on bass, Marisa on vocals, Yvonne on rhythm guitar, Larry on lead guitar and Mike on drums. Their first performance was at the Ocean Club in Cocoa Beach, Florida, in late 1986. Also on the bill was Declared Ungovernable, Belching Penguins, and the Rhythm Pigs. Shortening their name to The Genitorturers, the band underwent various personnel changes and progressed in the 1990s Florida "hardcore" music scene, with contemporary bands such as Marilyn Manson and the Spooky Kids, who also became a success in later years. According to the band's official biography, "What emerged would be a band that would go beyond shaking up the house that 'Mickey' built and extend to paving the way and breaking ground for performance based music artists thereafter worldwide".

In 1993, IRS Records owner Miles Copeland III sent his assistant Nick Turner (former drummer for The Lords of the New Church) to see the band perform. The quality of the performance, as well as their musical style containing fused elements of hardcore punk, metal and industrial electronics, led them to a record contract. Soon after that, they recorded 120 Days of Genitorture. After recording this album, Morbid Angel bassist/vocalist David Vincent (Gen's husband) joined the Genitorturers on bass. He left Morbid Angel in 1995, after the album Domination, to join his wife's band.

The band has extensively toured the United States, Japan, and Europe, and is internationally renowned for its exploits and erotic show content.

By the time of their second album Sin City in 1998, Genitorturers had gained a notable reputation with their flamboyant BDSM-themed shows resulting in the band appearing in various television features in the USA; including VH1, Fox News, Hard Copy, HBO's Real Sex and Playboy TV's Sexcetera.

The Flesh is the Law EP includes the track "Lecher Bitch", which was also included in the November 2004 video game Vampire: The Masquerade – Bloodlines. Earlier releases included Machine Love, which contains a cover of Divinyls' hit "I Touch Myself", which was produced by Dave Ogilvie and Rob Zombie producer Scott Humphrey.

In 2004, Genitorturers featured in a 12-page spread in the monthly pornographic publication Hustler, the magazine's only multi-page spread with a rock band. Hustler described Genitorturers as "the world's sexiest band".

In 2006, they toured Australia with Dead Inside the Chrysalis.

The band's last album, Blackheart Revolution, was released in 2009. In 2014, Genitorturers celebrated over 20 years since the release of their debut album by going on tour, '20 Years of Depravity'. On Halloween 2020, during a livestream, Genitorturers debuted their first song in 11 years "Scars & Stripes Forever".

== Members ==
=== Current members ===
- Gen – lead vocals (1986–present)
- Eric Griffin – guitars, backing vocals (2009–present)
- Kriz D.K. – drums (2011–present)
- Ilyn Nathaniel – bass, backing vocals (2023–present)

=== Former members ===
Guitars

- Yvonne Lievano – guitars (1986–1989)
- Scott Beckey – guitars (1989–1991)
- Jerry Ôutlaw – guitars (1991–1994)
- Chuck "Chains" Lenihan – guitars (1995–2002)
- Bizz – guitars (2003–2009)

Bass

- Paweł Mąciwoda – bass (1990)
- David "Evil D" Vincent – bass, backing vocals (1990–1992, 1994–2004)
- Sean Colpoys – bass (1992–1994)
- Abbey Nex – bass, backing vocals (2004–2009, 2022–2023)
- Ryan Seelbach – bass, backing vocals (2009–2022)

Drums

- Mike Owens – drums (1986–1991)
- AW Reckart – drums (1991–1993)
- Howard 'H-Bomb' Broadnax – drums (1993–1997)
- Racci Shay – drums (1997–2001)
- Angel Bartolotta – drums (2001–2005, 2006–2009)
- Joe Letz – drums (2005–2006)
- Sean Davidson – drums (2009–2011)

Keyboards

- James Creer – keyboards (1994–1995)
- Vinnie Saletto – keyboards (1995–1999)

== Discography ==
Studio albums

- 120 Days of Genitorture (1993)
- Sin City (1998)
- Blackheart Revolution (2009)

Remix albums

- Machine Love (2000)

Extended plays

- House of Shame (1991)
- Flesh Is the Law (2002)
- Touch Myself EP (2009)

Videos

- Society of Genitorture (VHS) (1997)
- The Society of Genitorture (DVD) (2001)
- Live in Sin (DVD) (2007)
- Scars and Stripes Forever (2025)

Movie soundtrack appearances

- The Society of Genitorture (1997)
- Raging Hormones (1999)
- Bike Week Exposed (2003)
- Vampire Clan (2002)

Video game soundtrack appearances

- True Crime: Streets of LA (2004)
- Vampire: The Masquerade – Bloodlines (2004)
