= Diet Wiegman =

Dutch artist

- Born: January 24, 1944 (age 82); Schiedam, Netherlands
- Education: Rotterdam Academy of Art
- Known for: Multidisciplinary visual artist; shadow art
- Notable work: Shadow and light sculptures

Diet Wiegman (born 24 January 1944 in Schiedam) is a Dutch multidisciplinary visual artist from the Netherlands.

Wiegman's father and grandfather were artists as well. This upbringing lead him to study at the Rotterdam Academy of Art, from 1961 to 1965, and to become a dedicated artist himself. An article in PetaPixel referred to Wiegman as an 'art omnivore'. He has works in a multitude of disciplines.

== Career ==
Wiegman acquired fame in the late nineteen sixties as a progressive ceramist. He made true-to-form rusted cans and military bags from clay. By doing so he demonstrated a combination between ‘future’ and ‘past’, with the creation of something new that was modeled after something in decay.

Wiegman also placed his works in a barrel, which he left rotating for days on end. The works came out broken up into tiny pieces. In that way he could see how the works would look decades into the future. By doing so, in his own mind, Wiegman stretched his life out over centuries. He experienced the fact that one is simply a collection of moving atoms around and that time is measured through transmutation - just as discarded metal objects are melted down to make something new.

Like artists Piero Manzoni, Yayoi Kusama, and later Jean-Michel Basquiat, Wiegman was represented by the renowned Gallery Delta in the Netherlands. As a result, Wiegman's sculptures were displayed internationally at galleries and art fairs including the Frans Hals Museum and the Museum of Art and Industry.

=== Shadow art ===
Wiegman's international breakthrough came with his shadow and light sculptures (also known as shadow art) where, by illuminating a pile of waste, a contrasting image would appear on the wall in the form of a highly detailed shadow. He later made sculptures in which he integrated shattered glass and mirror reflections with his shadow-art concept. By creating shadow art for almost five decades, Wiegman is seen as a pioneer in this field and his work has inspired numerous artists throughout the years.

When asked about his work in the 1970s, Wiegman simply said: “I did not invent the phenomenon shadow, I just make holes in the light”. Wiegman demonstrates his vision of looking at seemingly general objects in a different way. Also, his light sculptures produce more than just a shadow, behind each work lies a concept.

Wiegman's work often plays with clichés, distortion and contradiction. Sometimes it is philosophical. Sometimes it mocks its own seriousness, but it is mostly fresh, with a sense of irony. He has often destroyed his own artworks and later on combined fragments of the destroyed works in new sculptures. These became models for paintings and drawings that were exhibited.

Wiegman is called an ‘omnivore in art’ because every medium shows up in his oeuvre. Sculptures, paintings, drawings, glass and ceramic objects, performance art, art in public space, referring to fashion, architecture and more. In his performances, music and dance were also integrated. More and more he combines his works from various periods and mixes everything together. In his own words: ‘Analogous to life, just as every person reuses his early experiences and memories and combines them with new achievements from the present’.

=== Documentary ===
In 2008 'Anagram' was released, an award-winning documentary by director Mike Redman that highlights Wiegman's work and vision. Since Wiegman rarely speaks about his own art, it is a documentary without words that tells its own expressive story through Wiegman's art. In 2009 and 2010, Wiegman was voted ‘Most brilliant artist of the Netherlands’. His art can be found in the public space and is owned by museums and private collectors around the world.
