= Prophecy (Soulfly song) =

Single by Soulfly featuring David Ellefson

from the album Prophecy
- Released: February 14, 2004
- Genre: Groove metal
- Length: 3:36
- Label: Roadrunner
- Songwriter: Max Cavalera
- Producer: Max Cavalera

Soulfly singles chronology
| "Downstroy" (2002) | "Prophecy" (2004) | "Carved Inside" (2005) |

Music video
- "Prophecy" on YouTube

"Prophecy" is a song recorded by Soulfly in 2003 and released on February 14, 2004. The song is found on the band's fourth album Prophecy as the first and title track. It is the only single released from the album.

== Song ==
=== Composition ===
"Prophecy" has a simple makeup with half-tribal rhythm and tuned down guitars overlaid with roaring vocals from Max Cavalera. The song opens with up and down riffs with lines of catchy vocals typical of Soulfly songs. Megadeth bassist David Ellefson plays the bass throughout the song. The song ends with fast, thrashy riff with Cavalera chanting "New millennium tribal War" four times.

=== Lyrics ===
According to the lyrics, the song deals with prophecies surrounding tribes devastating cities in the desert next to the Red Sea, then marching to Mountains of Zion. While marching the way, he sees a blind sheep, crown of thorns, and flag of the conquering lion. After reaching the destination, prophecy continues with tribal war in the new millennium.

== Music video ==
The music video was filmed and takes place on the Navajo Nation in Monument Valley, Utah, meaning that Soulfly members perform in the desert on top of the pillar rock formation.

== Personnel ==
Regular members

- Max Cavalera – vocals, rhythm guitar
- Marc Rizzo – lead guitar
- Joe Nuñez – drums, percussion

Guest

- David Ellefson – bass

Other staff

- Max Cavalera – production, writing
- Terry Date – mixing
