= Joe Letz =

American drummer (born 1980)

- Born: October 26, 1980 (age 46); New York City, U.S.
- Genres: Electro-industrial, heavy metal, industrial metal, industrial rock, hardcore punk, electronica
- Occupation: Drummer
- Website: joeletz.com

Joe Letz is an American drummer best known as the former drummer for the electro-industrial band Combichrist and The Birthday Massacre. Letz has also drummed for Amen, Mortiis, Wednesday 13, Genitorturers, Hanzel und Gretyl, Imperative Reaction, Emigrate, Lindemann, and Aesthetic Perfection.

Letz DJs in his downtime between tours and supports Rammstein as a DJ since 2012.

He has also remixed the song "Sinematic" for the metalcore band Motionless in White.
