= Norwood, Massachusetts =

- Town
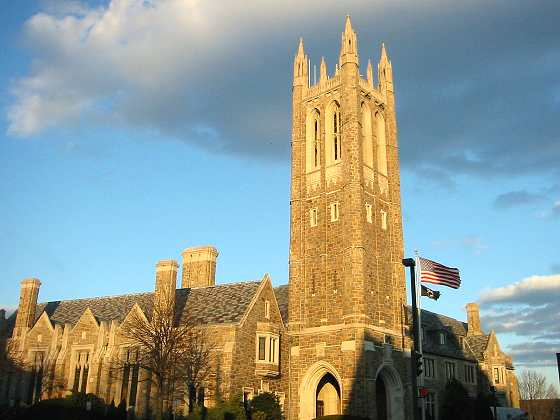
- Norwood Memorial Municipal Building (Town Hall)

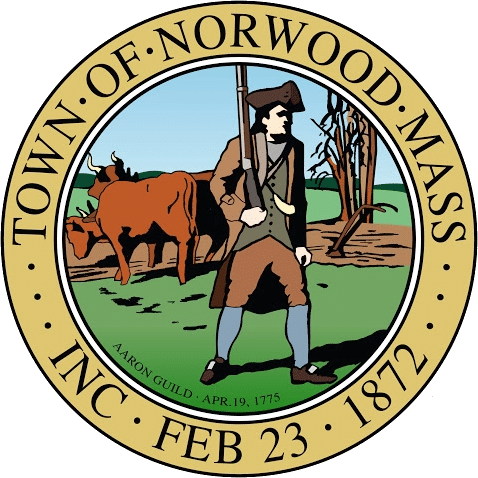
- Seal

- Location in Norfolk County in Massachusetts
- Coordinates: 42°11′40″N 71°12′0″W
- Country: United States
- State: Massachusetts
- County: Norfolk
- Settled: Sep 4 1678
- Incorporated: 1872

Government
  - Type: Representative town meeting
  - Town Manager: Tony Mazzucco

Area
  - Total: 10.5 sq mi (27.3 km^{2})
  - Land: 10.5 sq mi (27.1 km^{2})
  - Water: 0.077 sq mi (0.2 km^{2})
- Elevation: 148 ft (45 m)

Population (2020)
  - Total: 31,612
  - Density: 3,021/sq mi (1,166.5/km^{2})
- Time zone: UTC−5 (Eastern)
  - Summer (DST): UTC−4 (Eastern)
- ZIP Code: 02062
- Area code: 339 / 781
- FIPS code: 25-50250
- GNIS feature ID: 0619460
- Website: www.norwoodma.gov

Norwood is a town and census-designated place in Norfolk County, Massachusetts, United States. Norwood is part of the Greater Boston area. As of the 2020 census, the population was 31,611. The town was named after Norwood, England. Norwood is on the Neponset River, which runs all the way to Boston Harbor from Foxborough.

Norwood has a Town Meeting form of Government with a SelectBoard and a Town Manager.

== History ==
The Town of Norwood, officially formed in 1872, was until that time part of Dedham, known as the "mother of towns", as fourteen of the present communities of eastern Massachusetts lay within its original borders. Long used as a hunting ground by Native Americans, Norwood was first settled by Ezra Morse in 1678. He set up a sawmill in what is now South Norwood, the part of town to which the first concentration of families, almost all of whom were farmers, migrated over the next half-century.

During the American Revolution, there was a Minuteman company organized in the area. Its captain, Aaron Guild, on learning of the British marching on Lexington and Concord to seize the munitions stored there, rode to join the fight and arrived in time to fire on the British at Concord Bridge and participate in the running battle that chased the Redcoats back to Boston.

Abraham Lincoln passed through the town during his pre-inaugural tour of New England.

The Oak View Mansion, located in Norwood, was built by Francis Olney Winslow. Construction began in 1868 and was completed in 1870. Oak View was the scene of almost constant socializing. Some of the most prominent figures hosted in Oak View were President and future Supreme Court Justice William Howard Taft and President Calvin Coolidge.

Famous Irish-language writer Máirtín Ó Cadhain spent some time in Norwood during the early-20th century. Ó Cadhain later references Norwood in his 1949 book Cré na Cille, in which one of the characters immigrates to Norwood.

In 1955, United Fruit Company purchased the Forbes estate in Norwood from Harvard University and soon constructed one of the largest banana research facilities in the Americas. It was at its Norwood facility that United Fruit Company designed and later patented freeze-dried fruits, vegetables, and seafood for companies like Kellogg's and Campbell's.

The town shares its name with a town in the borough of Croydon, South London, England. When Norwood separated from Dedham, they considered naming the new community Balch, after the Rev. Thomas Balch.

== Geography ==
Norwood is located at 42°11′9″N 71°12′5″W (42.185974, −71.201661).

The Town of Norwood is located 13 miles southwest of Boston, placing it in the Boston Metropolitan Area.

According to the United States Census Bureau, the town has a total area of 10.6 square miles (27.3 km^{2}), of which 10.5 square mile (27.1 km^{2}) is land and 0.1 square mile (0.2 km^{2}) (0.66%) is water.

== Demographics ==
Historical population
| Year | Pop. | ±% |
|---|---|---|
| 1880 | 2,845 | — |
| 1890 | 3,733 | +31.2% |
| 1900 | 5,480 | +46.8% |
| 1910 | 8,014 | +46.2% |
| 1920 | 12,627 | +57.6% |
| 1930 | 15,049 | +19.2% |
| 1940 | 15,383 | +2.2% |
| 1950 | 16,636 | +8.1% |
| 1960 | 24,898 | +49.7% |
| 1970 | 30,815 | +23.8% |
| 1980 | 29,711 | −3.6% |
| 1990 | 28,700 | −3.4% |
| 2000 | 28,587 | −0.4% |
| 2010 | 28,602 | +0.1% |
| 2020 | 31,611 | +10.5% |
| 2024* | 31,764 | +0.5% |
* = population estimate. Source: United States Census records and Population Estimates Program data.

As of 2023 Norwood's racial demographics are

- White: 80.09%
- Black or African American: 7.89%
- Asian: 5.17%
- Two or more races: 3.91%
- Other race: 2.94%
- Native American: 0.01%
- Native Hawaiian or Pacific Islander: 0

As of the census of 2010, there were 30,602 people. The racial makeup of the town was 80.92% White, 8.01% Black or African American, 0.09% Native American, 9.57% Asian, 0.01% Pacific Islander, 0.77% from other races, and 1.25% from two or more races. Hispanic or Latino of any race were 3.58% of the population. 27.3% were of Irish descent.

As of the census of 2000, there were 28,587 people, 11,623 households, and 7,380 families residing in the town. The population density was 2,727.0 inhabitants per square mile (1,052.9/km^{2}). There were 11,945 housing units at an average density of 1,139.5 per square mile (440.0/km^{2}). The racial makeup of the town was 90.51% White, 2.31% Black or African American, 0.09% Native American, 5.06% Asian, 0.01% Pacific Islander, 0.77% from other races, and 1.25% from two or more races. Hispanic or Latino of any race were 1.65% of the population. 34.7% were of Irish, 14.8% Italian, 5.4% American and 5.0% English ancestry according to Census 2000.

There were 11,623 households, out of which 27.2% had children under the age of 18 living with them, 50.9% were married couples living together, 9.9% had a female householder with no husband present, and 36.5% were non-families. 29.4% of all households were made up of individuals, and 12.0% had someone living alone who was 65 years of age or older. The average household size was 2.41 and the average family size was 3.05.

In the town, the population was spread out, with 20.8% under the age of 18, 6.4% from 18 to 24, 33.2% from 25 to 44, 22.1% from 45 to 64, and 17.6% who were 65 years of age or older. The median age was 39 years. For every 100 females, there were 89.7 males. For every 100 females age 18 and over, there were 86.5 males.

The median income for a household in the town was $58,421, and the median income for a family was $70,164 (these figures had risen to $66,743 and $80,292 respectively as of a 2007 estimate). Males had a median income of $50,597 versus $34,312 for females. The per capita income for the town was $27,720. About 2.7% of families and 4.4% of the population were below the poverty line, including 6.5% of those under age 18 and 3.9% of those age 65 or over.

== Education ==
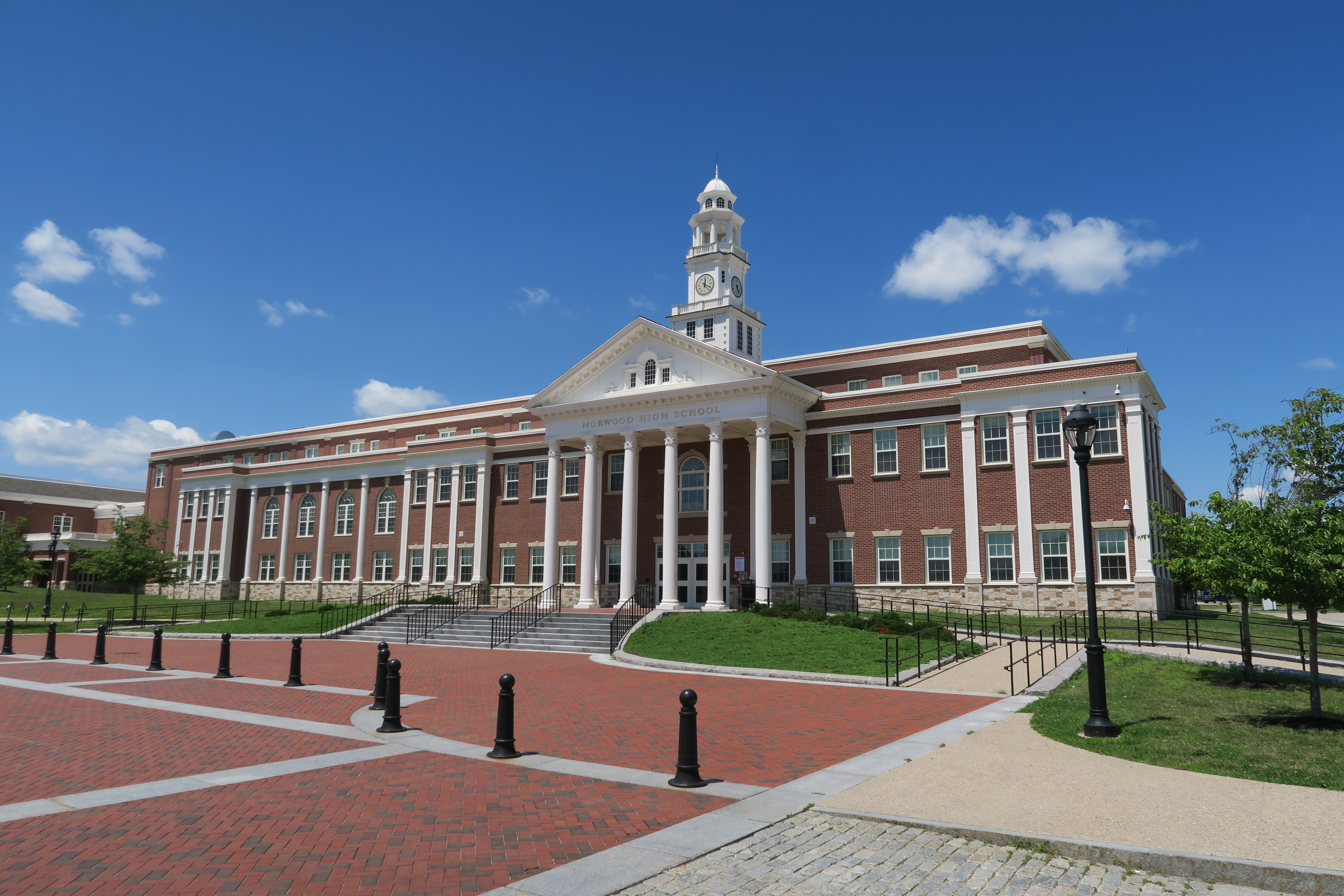
Norwood High School

The Norwood Public Schools operates eight schools (serving Kindergarten through 4th graders), and an additional school institution, Little Mustangs Preschool Academy. The public elementary schools located in Norwood include: Balch, Callahan, Cleveland, Oldham, Prescott, & Willett.

Norwood has one public middle school, the Dr. Philip O. Coakley Middle School (serving 5th through 8th graders) (formerly Norwood Junior High South), where all six elementary schools combine. Norwood also has a public high school, Norwood High School (NHS), (serves grades 9–12).

== Higher education ==
The Fine Mortuary College in Norwood includes a one-room museum featuring antique embalming tables and centuries-old wooden coffins.

== Business ==
Businesses in Norwood have access to the most educated workforce in the nation, ample venture capital, and several other advantages that help lay the foundation for regional clusters and Norwood's target industries, like advanced manufacturing and life sciences.

Norwood's top employers include Moderna, FM Global, Home Market Foods, MS Walker, and many other manufacturers and businesses engaged in research and development.

Moderna opened its state-of-the-art clinical development site in 2018, employing over 1,400. Moderna's Norwood facilities serve as its primary manufacturing facility and is responsible for producing its COVID-19 vaccine. The facility in Norwood has been expanded to increase the production capacity of Moderna's vaccine and to support the company's research and development efforts. Additionally, Moderna has established partnerships with local organizations in Norwood to support the community, including funding for education and workforce development initiatives.

A large cluster of automobile dealerships on Route 1 is known as the Norwood "Automile." The concept of having competing dealerships join together to publicize the "Automile" as an automobile shopping center was largely the work of Ernie Boch, famous in the Boston area for his ads urging people to "Come on down!"

The Skating Club of Boston moved to Norwood in 2020. The facility, located on University Avenue in Norwood, is a state-of-the-art skating rink home to the Skating Club of Boston's training and development programs for figure skating, ice dancing, and synchronized skating. The Norwood High School hockey teams play at the facility. In addition to the rink, the facility features a fitness center, a pro shop, and a cafe. The Skating Club of Boston has a rich history in figure skating and has produced many world champions and Olympic medalists.

== Architecture ==
- Norwood's town square is dominated by its town hall, the Norwood Memorial Municipal Building (Town Hall). It includes a 50-bell carillon tower housing the Walter F. Tilton Memorial Carillon, one of nine carillons in Massachusetts. On the National Register of Historic Places.
- Morrill Memorial Library (1898–1899), Joseph Ladd Neal, architect.
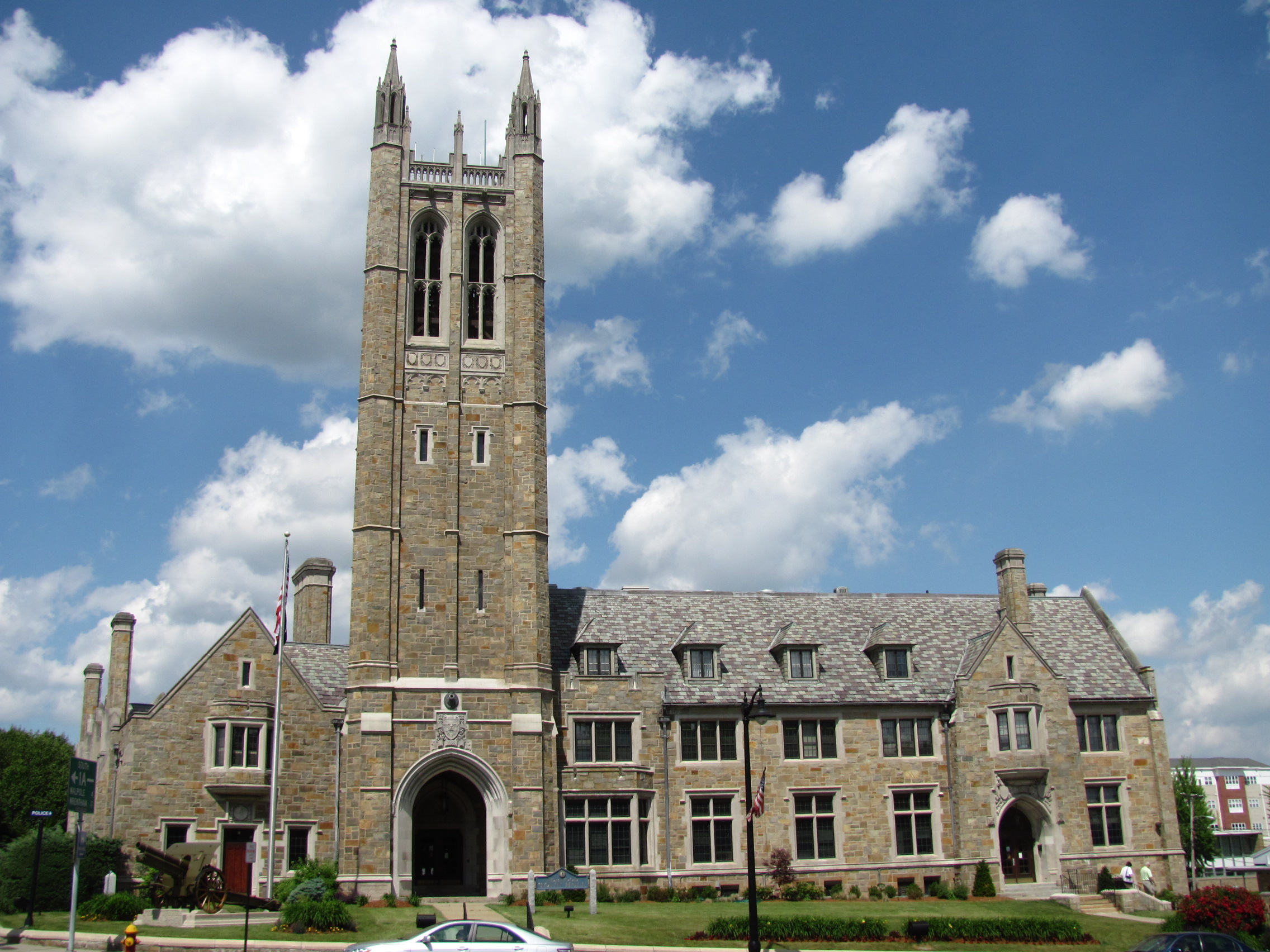
Norwood Memorial Municipal Building (Town Hall).

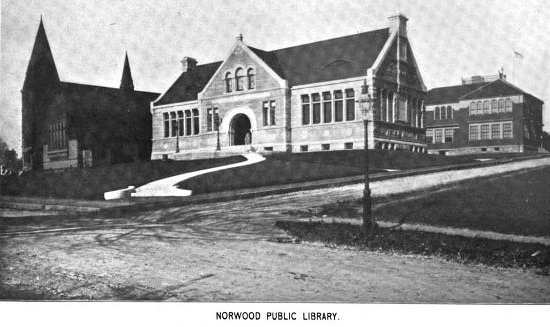
Morrill Memorial Library.

== Art ==
Norwood was the long-time home of photographer and publisher Fred Holland Day. As a photographer, Day at one point rivalled Alfred Stieglitz in influence. The publishing firm of Copeland and Day was the American publisher of Oscar Wilde's Salome with illustrations by Aubrey Beardsley. The Day House is now a museum and the headquarters of the Norwood Historical Society. F. Holland Day Historic House Museum is located at 93 Day St.

== Climate ==
Norwood has a hot summer humid continental climate (Dfa.)

Climate data for Norwood, Massachusetts (Norwood Memorial Airport), 1991−2020 normals, (Note: Mean monthly maxima and minima (i.e. the highest and lowest temperature readings during an entire month or year) calculated based on data at said location from 1991 to 2020.) extremes 1895−present (Note: Official records for Norwood were kept at the COOP from December 1900 to May 1911, the Weather Bureau Office from June 1911 to February 1937, at various locations in and around the city from March 1937 to July 1942, and at Norwood Memorial Airport since August 1942. For more information, see ThreadEx.)
| Month | Jan | Feb | Mar | Apr | May | Jun | Jul | Aug | Sep | Oct | Nov | Dec | Year |
|---|---|---|---|---|---|---|---|---|---|---|---|---|---|
| Mean daily maximum °F (°C) | 39.5 (4.2) | 42.3 (5.7) | 48.9 (9.4) | 61.2 (16.2) | 71.3 (21.8) | 80.4 (26.9) | 85.7 (29.8) | 84.3 (29.1) | 76.8 (24.9) | 65.7 (18.7) | 54.6 (12.6) | 44.3 (6.8) | 62.9 (17.2) |
| Daily mean °F (°C) | 30.1 (−1.1) | 32.0 (0.0) | 39.2 (4.0) | 50.1 (10.1) | 59.6 (15.3) | 68.8 (20.4) | 74.3 (23.5) | 72.4 (22.4) | 64.5 (18.1) | 53.4 (11.9) | 44.1 (6.7) | 35.3 (1.8) | 52.0 (11.1) |
| Mean daily minimum °F (°C) | 20.6 (−6.3) | 21.6 (−5.8) | 29.5 (−1.4) | 39.0 (3.9) | 47.9 (8.8) | 57.3 (14.1) | 62.8 (17.1) | 60.6 (15.9) | 52.1 (11.2) | 41.2 (5.1) | 33.6 (0.9) | 26.3 (−3.2) | 41.0 (5.0) |
| Average rainfall inches (mm) | 3.41 (87) | 2.80 (71) | 3.72 (94) | 3.96 (101) | 3.30 (84) | 3.92 (100) | 3.03 (77) | 3.63 (92) | 3.82 (97) | 4.54 (115) | 3.69 (94) | 4.09 (104) | 43.91 (1,115) |
| Average snowfall inches (cm) | 15.1 (38) | 14.1 (36) | 11.6 (29) | 2.5 (6.4) | 0 (0) | 0 (0) | 0 (0) | 0 (0) | 0 (0) | 0.3 (0.76) | 1.7 (4.3) | 10.8 (27) | 56.1 (142) |
Source: NOAA (snowfall data from WALPOLE 2)

== Transportation ==
- U.S. 1 is a major artery through Norwood, and a regional hub for commercial activity, dominated by strip malls and chain stores and restaurants for a 35-mile stretch between West Roxbury to Pawtucket, RI.) Interstate 95 has one exit in town that also serves neighboring Canton. This is the main highway running between the Boston metro area and points south.
- Three MBTA Commuter Rail stations served by the Franklin/Foxboro Line – Norwood Depot, Norwood Central, and Windsor Gardens – are located in Norwood. MBTA bus route 34E runs through Norwood on Washington Street.
- Norwood Memorial Airport is a general aviation airport with limited passenger service.

== Notable people ==
- Frank G. Allen, Governor of Massachusetts, 1929–1931
- Dicky Barrett, lead singer of The Mighty Mighty Bosstones
- Harry Bigelow, lawyer
- Ernie Boch, Jr., CEO, president, and spokesman of Boch Enterprises, a $1 billion business consisting primarily of automobile dealerships in Norwood
- Peter Boghossian, American philosopher and author
- Michael D. Cohen, actor and comedian, starred in Nickelodeon TV series Henry Danger
- F. Holland Day, photographer
- William Cameron Forbes, Governor General of the Philippines, 1909–1913
- Zhenya Gay, writers and children's book illustrator
- Joseph Gould, "Professor Seagull" and the author of the unpublished "Oral History of our Time"
- Harry and the Potters, rock band
- Andrew Hoffman, Professor of Business and Sustainability, the University of Michigan Ross School of Business and School for Environment and Sustainability
- Bill Keating, U.S. representative for Massachusetts
- Jon Purnell, United States Ambassador to Uzbekistan
- Brendan Emmett Quigley, crossword constructor
- Ann Ritonia, U.S. marine and Episcopal priest
- John H. Rogers, former Massachusetts House Majority Leader
- Tony Rombola, guitar player for hard rock band Godsmack
- Jason Schauble, businessman and veteran
- Tom Shillue, stand-up comedian, barbershop quartet singer, host of Fox News Channel's overnight program Red Eye with Tom Shillue
- Robert Sullivan, Classical Trumpet Player, New York Philharmonic, Cleveland Orchestra, Cincinnati Symphony Orchestra and Professor of Trumpet, the University of Michigan School of Music, Theatre, and Dance

=== Notable sports figures ===
- Jake Layman, former NBA player
- Keith Adams, former pro football player
- Charlie Bowles, former major league baseball player
- Marty Callaghan, former major league baseball player
- Allen Doyle, former pro golfer
- Joe Dugan, former major league baseball player and member of the New York Yankees first World Series title in 1923
- Alfred Fincher, former pro football player for Washington Redskins
- Noah Hanifin, current pro hockey player for the Calgary Flames
- Richie Hebner, former major league baseball player
- Joe Hulbig, former pro hockey player, Boston and Edmonton
- Peter Laviolette, professional and Olympic hockey coach
- Rhoda Leonard, All-American Girls Professional Baseball League player, teacher in Norwood public schools system
- Skip Lockwood, former major league baseball player
- Ray Martin, former major league baseball player
- Bob Quinn, general manager pro football's Detroit Lions
- Allen Ripley, former major league baseball player
- Mike Sherman, former head football coach for Green Bay Packers and Texas A&M Aggies
- Mike Smith, former major league baseball player
- George Sullivan, former Notre Dame football champion, former pro football player for the Boston Yanks, Massachusetts Senator and Judge
- Bill Travers, former major league baseball player
- Neal Flaherty, television and movie producer.
- Greg Vrotsos, Actor.

== Media ==
Norwood is served by several local media outlets including Norwood Community Media, Norwood.ma, and The Norwood Record. Norwood is also within the circulation area for The Boston Globe and The Boston Herald.
