= Hell & Heaven Metal Fest =

Annual Mexican heavy metal festival

- Genre: Metal
- Dates: March
- Locations: Mexico City, Mexico
- Years active: 2010–present
- Website: hellandheavenfest.com

Hell & Heaven Metal Fest (H&H or Festival Hell and Heaven) is an open air heavy metal music festival. It takes place annually during Fall or Spring, near Mexico City in Toluca, located in the State of Mexico, in the central part of the country. With over 40,000 festival visitors, it attracts metal music fans of all subgenres including thrash metal, black metal, death metal, power metal, gothic metal, folk metal, metalcore, nu metal, hard rock and other variations of heavy metal from all over the world. The festival is mostly attended by a Mexican audience from all around the country, but attracts a large number of visitors from Central and South America, Europe and other parts of the world.

The festival was first held in 2010 as an attempt to create a large scale Metal event for the Latin American community, known for its loyal following to Metal resembling that of European Metal fans. By 2013 word of the event had expanded beyond the region's limits, and has come to include over 60 bands from Europe, Latin America, North America and Australasia. H&H has been held in March and lasts two days, during which the festival-goers camp on large camping grounds surrounding the actual festival area, full amenities, security, first aid, and handicapped access are provided, as well as a VIP lounge tent. Within the limits of the festival, a fair is set up to provide fans with amusement and entertainment rides between performances or to take a break from the ongoing mosh pit. Other visitor activities include: Skatepark, Wrestling matches, cock fights, open restaurants, among others.

Currently the organizers are conceptualizing a regional "festival opening act", as is the case with Wacken's Firefighters at the famous German extreme music festival.

The event continues to attract bigger names in Metal with bands from further distances traveling to perform here. Events of this magnitude have demonstrated to provide economic benefits to the surrounding communities and regional tourism.

After several days of uncertainty, the 2014 festival was definitely canceled two days prior to start date. However, it has been announced that a replacement one-day festival will be held at the Autódromo Hermanos Rodríguez on 25 October 2014.

== 2010 ==
Hell & Heaven Metal Fest 2010 held on Sunday, 17 October.

Lineup
Sunday

Therion (Sweden)
Brujeria (Mexico)
Cage (U.S.)
Transmetal (Mexico)
Anabantha (Mexico)
Luzbel (Mexico)
Psicofonía (Mexico)
Anarchus (Mexico)
Thell Barrio (Mexico)

== 2011 ==
Hell & Heaven Metal Fest 2011, was held on Wednesday, 11 November.

Lineup
Wednesday

Megadeth (U.S.)
Overkill (U.S.)
Fear Factory (U.S.)
Brujeria (Mexico)
Moonspell (Portugal)
Kataklysm (Canada)
Destruction (Germany)
Mayan (Netherlands)
Dark Funeral (Sweden)
Tristania (Norway)

== 2012 ==
Suspended

== 2013 ==
Hell & Heaven Metal Fest 2013 was held from Saturday, 18 May to Sunday, 19 May.

Hell Stage
Saturday	Sunday
Anthrax (U.S.); Epica (Netherlands); Suicidal Tendencies (U.S.); Moonspell (Portugal); Transmetal (Mexico)	Motörhead (England); In Flames (Sweden); Exodus (U.S.); Six Feet Under (U.S.); Haggard (Germany); Día De Los Muertos (U.S.); Here Comes the Kraken (Mexico)

Heaven Stage
Saturday	Sunday
Morbid Angel (U.S.); Sodom (Germany); Vital Remains (U.S.); Ill Niño (U.S.)	Municipal Waste (U.S.); Gilby Clarke (U.S.); Heathen (U.S.); Resorte (Mexico)

Monster Stage
Saturday	Sunday
Warbringer (U.S.)	As Blood Runs Black (U.S.)

== 2014 ==
Cancelled two days before the anticipated date

Hell & Heaven Metal Fest 2014 was scheduled from Saturday, 15 March to Sunday, 16 March. This event was officially canceled on Thursday, 13 March.

Before the event's cancellation, the announced line-up was as follows:

Saturday	Sunday
Kiss (U.S.); Korn (U.S.); Twisted Sister (U.S.); Carcass (England); Trivium (U.S.); Misfits (U.S.); Destruction (Germany); Brujeria (Mexico); Obituary (U.S.); Possessed (U.S.); Suicide Silence (U.S.); Suffocation (U.S.); Día De Los Muertos (U.S.); Hocico (Mexico); Combichrist (Norway); Carpathian Forest (Norway); Flotsam and Jetsam (U.S.); Fleshgod Apocalypse (Italy)	Guns N' Roses (U.S.); Rob Zombie (U.S.); Opeth (Sweden); Lamb of God (U.S.); Testament (U.S.); Marduk (Sweden); P.O.D. (U.S.); DragonForce (England); Deicide (U.S.); Angra (Brazil); Tankard (Germany); Transmetal (Mexico); Cephalic Carnage (U.S.); Goatwhore (U.S.); Pornomotora (Colombia); Makina (Mexico)

Many of the performers from the planned Day 1 will perform at the 25 October replacement festival.

Replacement festival at October, 25th

Corona Hell Stage	Heaven Stage	True Metal Stage	Foro Norte Stage	New Blood Stage
Kiss; Korn; Annihilator; Overkill; Dia de los Muertos; Pinhed (U.S.); Agora (Mexico); Mikankh (Mexico)	Limp Bizkit; Rob Zombie; Angra; U.D.O. Maligno (Mexico); Nata (Mexico); Sekta Core (Mexico); Makina (Mexico)	Venom; Obituary; Samael; Terrorizer; Havok; Transmetal; Cephalic Carnage; Pro-Fé-Cia (U.S.); Nightbreed (Mexico); Thantra (Mexico); Draksen (Mexico); Mystica Girls (Mexico); Leprosy (Mexico); Avatar (Mexico)	Christian Death; Godless Procession (Mexico); Pressive (Mexico); Salvador y los Eones (Mexico); Cannibal 69 (Mexico); Orka; Trágico Ballet (Mexico); Rotting Christ; Cemican (Mexico); Dante (Colombia); After the Nightfall (Mexico); Stoneflex; Wrecker (Mexico); Agony Lords (Mexico); Archetype (Mexico); Dirty Woman (Mexico); Hellryde Inc. (Mexico); Cthulhu (Mexico); Pornomotora (Colombia)	Unleash the Archers; Next (Mexico); Rain Shatter (Mexico); Intoxxxicated (Mexico); Thrashsteel (Mexico); Spit on Your Grave (Mexico); Mexxica (Mexico); BlackRider (Mexico); Zamak (Mexico); Denial (Mexico); Drowned in Blood; Naurum (Mexico); From Oblivion (Costa Rica); Black Noize (U.S.); Angeles y Demonios (Mexico); Biomortek (Mexico); Tenebrarum; Alaydha (Mexico)

== 2016 ==
Hell & Heaven Metal Fest 2016, was held on Saturday, July, 23rd.

Hell Stage	Heaven Stage	True Metal Stage	Alternative Stage	New Blood Stage
Rammstein; Five Finger Death Punch; Epica; DragonForce; Killcode (U.S.); Tanus (Mexico); Supremacy (Colombia); Espina	Twisted Sister; Ghost; Amon Amarth; Mushroomhead; Fear Factory; Transmetal; Colectivo Suicida (Chile)	Behemoth; Ensiferum; Suffocation; Sepultura; Dying Fetus; Voivod; Bulldozer; Nightbreed (Mexico); Pinhed (U.S.); Winter Haven (Mexico); Mordskog (Mexico); El Cuervo de Poe (Mexico); Orka	Suicide Silence; Thell Barrio (Mexico); Suicidal Tendencies; P.O.D. Alien Ant Farm; A.N.I.M.A.L. Koyi K Utho; Here Comes the Kraken; Pressive (Mexico); Thantra (Mexico); Rejexion (Mexico); Seal the Rhizome (Mexico); Deiform (U.S.); Akasha (Costa Rica); Lethal Creation (Mexico)	Abolishment of Flesh (U.S.); Origin; Arcadia Libre (Mexico); Anima Tempo (Mexico); Julian's Fire (Colombia); Cathleen (Mexico); Rain Shatter (Mexico); Taipan (International); All Misery (Mexico); Driven; Anima Inside (Ecuador); El Clan (Mexico); Raven Black (U.S.); Obey the Moon (Mexico); Black Overdrive (Mexico); War Kabinett (Mexico)

== 2018 ==
The 2018 Hell and Heaven festival is sponsored by Corona and will be held at Autodrómo Hermanos Rodríguez in Mexico City on 4 and 5 May 2018.

Friday, 4 May
Corona Hell Stage	Heaven Stage	True Stage	Alternative Stage
Scorpions; Mastodon; Refused; De La Tierra; QBO (Mexico)	Deep Purple; Dead Cross; Kadavar; After the Burial; The Warning	Sabaton; Moonspell; Testament; Vein (Colombia); Jet Jaguar (Mexico); Nightbreed (Mexico); Thantra (Mexico)	Bad Religion; The Darkness; Resorte; Gruesome (U.S.); Maligno (Mexico); Cardiel (Venezuela); BETA (Mexico)

Saturday, 5 May
Corona Hell Stage	Heaven Stage	True Stage	Alternative Stage
Ozzy Osbourne; Megadeth; Gojira; Saxon; The Charm The Fury; Tanus (Mexico); S7N	Judas Priest; Marilyn Manson; Killswitch Engage; L7; Agora (Mexico); Deadly Apples; Pressive (Mexico)	Epica; Overkill; Watain; Brujeria; Tankard; Nervosa (Brazil); Gore and Carnage (Mexico); Strike Master (Mexico); Lack of Remorse (Mexico); Tulkas (Mexico)	Tenacious D Hollywood Undead; Hawthorne Heights; Skindred; Los Viejos (Mexico); Disidente (Mexico); De Nalgas (Mexico); Zoviet (U.S.); Sierra León (Mexico)

== 2020 ==
The 2020 edition took place on 14 and 15 March, amid concerns for the fast-growing COVID-19 pandemic. The festival was originally scheduled to be held at the Oceania Park in Mexico City, but after the riots that occurred at this same site during the 2019 Knotfest meets Forcefest, the organizers decided to change the location to the Foro Pegaso in Toluca, 45 minutes outside of Mexico City. It also marks the 10th anniversary of the festival. Cancellations amid COVID-19 occurred both days, but mostly on 15 March. Bands that had to back out included acts such as Megadeth, King Diamond, Cypress Hill, DevilDriver, Death Angel, and Heaven Shall Burn,

=== 14 March 2020 ===
Hell Stage	Heaven Stage	Alternative Stage	Hard Tent
Manowar; Phil Anselmo & The Illegals; Static-X; Max & Iggor Cavalera's (Return to Roots); Loudness; Minipony; Obesity	Deep Purple; Amon Amarth; Powerwolf; Deadly Apples; Obey the Moon; Tanus; Surviving	Visions of Atlantis; Allison; Desierto Drive; Delux; Anima Tempo; 7 Negro; Apolo 7; Fellowcraft; Asesino; Nueve Nueve Seis; Bloodfield; Zazel; Point Decster	Cabron; Critical Assembly; Cicuta; Aire Como Plomo; Nostra Morte; Boats; All Misery; Midaz; Smash-O; Young Lust; Parásitos; Camanchet; Demensia

=== 15 March 2020 ===
Hell Stage	Heaven Stage	Alternative Stage	Hard Tent
Jinjer; Turilli/Lione Rhapsody; Nervosa; Cemican; El Cuervo de Poe	Soulfly; Crazy Town; Pressive; Hypno5e; Operus; Salvador y Los Eones; Raped God 666	Incite; Ace Kool; High Rate Extincion; Anabantha; Anna Fiori; Raxas; Mortuary; Fractal Dimension; Vulgar Addiction; Insertion Loss; Dethdealer$; Ines Chavez; Ruinas	Makina; Next; Taste of Greed; Perros de Reserva; Highway; Metal Blade; Ash Nazg Búrz; Winter Haven; Defecto; Artilleria; Pancho Killer; Magma Souls; Dlded

== 2022 ==
The 2022 edition of Hell & Heaven 2022 was confirmed on 3 February 2022, resuming the first headliner that had been planned for the 2021 edition, which will be the American group: Slipknot. On 25 August of the same year, the poster for the 2022 edition was officially announced despite the delays of the festival organizers in which it will take place on 2, 3 and 4 December at Foro Pegaso, Toluca de Lerdo, Toluca, State of Mexico.

== See also ==
- List of heavy metal festivals
