= Primitive (Soulfly album) =

Studio album by Soulfly
- Released: September 26, 2000
- Recorded: 1999–2000
- Studio: The Saltmine Studio Oasis (Mesa, Arizona)
- Genre: Nu metal
- Length: 52:16; 72:54 (digipak)
- Label: Roadrunner
- Producer: Toby Wright; Max Cavalera; Sean Lennon

Soulfly chronology
Tribe (1999)	Primitive (2000)	3 (2002)

Singles from Primitive
- 1. "Back to the Primitive" Released: December 4, 2000; 2. "Son Song" Released: January 30, 2001; 3. "Jumpdafuckup" Released: 2001

Primitive is the second studio album by American heavy metal band Soulfly, released on September 26, 2000, through Roadrunner Records. As of 2002, Primitive has sold over 226,569 copies as reported by SoundScan.

In 2019, Joe Smith-Engelhardt of Alternative Press included the song "Jumpdafuckup" in his list of "Top 10 nü-metal staples that still hold up today".

== Background ==
The first track of Primitive is "Back to the Primitive", which plays berimbau to begin the song and the album. "Back to the Primitive" is one of three singles released from the album, others were "Son Song" and "Jumpdafuckup".

"Jumpdafuckup" features Corey Taylor of Slipknot and Stone Sour on vocals, as well as sludgy guitar riffs. "Mulambo" appears in the movie The Forsaken. "Terrorist" incorporates lyrics from songs recorded by other bands: "Inner Self" by Sepultura and "Criminally Insane" by Slayer. In addition, "Terrorist" features Slayer vocalist Tom Araya.

"Son Song" pays tribute both singers' fathers who died young. Sean Lennon's father, John Lennon, was shot, while Max's father died from a heart attack. Musically, "Son Song" has Alice in Chains-like grungy riffs and Layne Staley-like vocals by Lennon. The song appears on the Valentine OST, although it's not included in the film.

"In Memory of..." is unique for Soulfly in that it contains rap elements. "Soulfly II" is the sequel to the first eponymously titled song, which uses a large number of instruments, including Congo drums, piano, sitar, twang, and various wind instruments. Asha Rabouin makes her first Soulfly appearance on "Flyhigh", in which she sings lines like 'Just let my soul fly free'.

== Reception ==
Professional ratings
Review scores
Source	Rating
AllMusic	2/5 stars
Blabbermouth.net	8/10
Collector's Guide to Heavy Metal	8/10
Rolling Stone	3.5/5 stars

- Rolling Stone (9/28/00, pp. 53–4) - 3.5 stars out of 5 - "Old-school...Primitive is deeper...in the sound of [ex-Sepultura frontman] Max Cavalera's lived-in growl, the churning effect of a 4-string guitar and his concerns."
- Q magazine (11/00, pp. 114–6) - 3 stars out of 5 - "While [their] percussive, ethnic grooves certainly make an impact, it's only when Cavalera allows his formula to be altered by others that sparks truly fly."
- Alternative Press (11/00, p. 128) - 3 out of 5 - "With pre-millennial speed metal rubbing elbows with hip-hop, excursions into ambient instrumentals and acerbic soul, and a host of guests...Primitive is certainly a record [with] breadth."
- CMJ (8/28/00, p. 32) - "More relaxed than their debut, the low-end slaughterhouse riffs are still embellished with Cavalera's beloved tribal percussion...[It] locks its teeth into the jugular."
- Melody Maker (10/10/00, p. 50) - 4 stars out of 5 - "The metal album of the year so far...An incendiary blend of nu metal, reggae and Brazilian rhythms."
- NME (11/4/00, p. 46) - 7 out of 10 - "Draws on Max's political rage at colonial history and crimes of the conquistadors...the heavy metal Bob Marley."

== Track listing ==
All tracks are written by Max Cavalera except where noted.

Primitive
No.	Title	Lyrics	Music	Length
1.	"Back to the Primitive"			4:22
2.	"Pain" (featuring Grady Avenell and Chino Moreno)	Max Cavalera; Chino Moreno; Grady Avenell		3:40
3.	"Bring It"			3:22
4.	"Jumpdafuckup" (featuring Corey Taylor)	Max Cavalera; Corey Taylor		5:11
5.	"Mulambo"			4:20
6.	"Son Song" (featuring Sean Lennon)	Sean Lennon; Max Cavalera	Sean Lennon; Max Cavalera	4:18
7.	"Boom"			4:56
8.	"Terrorist" (featuring Tom Araya)	Max Cavalera; Tom Araya		3:47
9.	"The Prophet"			2:57
10.	"Soulfly II" (instrumental)			6:05
11.	"In Memory Of..." (featuring Babatunde Rabouin, Deonte Perry and Justus Olbert)	Max Cavalera; Babatunde Rabouin; Justus Olbert; Deonte Perry	Deonte Perry; Max Cavalera	4:36
12.	"Flyhigh" (featuring Asha Rabouin)	Max Cavalera; Justus Olbert		4:50
Total length:				52:17

Limited edition digipak and Japanese edition bonus tracks
No.	Title	Length
13.	"Eye for an Eye" (live at Roskilde Festival 1998)	3:50
14.	"Tribe" (live at Roskilde Festival 1998)	6:24
15.	"Soulfire"	5:14
16.	"Soulfly (Universal Spirit mix)" (featuring Dayjah)	6:08
Total length:		72:54

iTunes bonus tracks
No.	Title	Lyrics	Length
13.	"Terrorist" (Total Destruction mix)	Max Cavalera; Tom Araya	4:39
14.	"Back to the Primitive" (Dub Shit Up mix)		4:33
15.	"Bring It" (Armageddon mix)		3:26
16.	"Soulfire"		5:14
Total length:			70:09

== Personnel ==
Soulfly

- Max Cavalera – vocals, 4-string guitar, berimbau (tracks 1, 6, 7, 12)
- Mikey Doling – lead guitar
- Marcello D. Rapp – bass, percussion, drums (track 11)
- Joe Nunez – drums

Additional musicians

- Grady Avenell – vocals (track 2)
- Chino Moreno – vocals (track 2)
- Corey Taylor – vocals (track 4)
- Sean Lennon – vocals, guitar, piano, synthesizer and producer (track 6)
- Tom Araya – vocals (track 8)
- Babatunde Rabouin – vocals (track 11)
- Deonte Perry – vocals (track 11), additional drum programming (tracks 6, 11)
- Justus Olbert – vocals (track 11)
- Asha Rabouin – vocals (track 12)
- Dayjah – vocals (track 16)
- The Mulambo Tribe – backing vocals (track 5)
- Zyon Cavalera – foosball sound (track 5)
- Igor Cavalera Jr. – "tuuu tuu" sound (track 5)
- Jose Navarro – feedback effect (track 8)
- Larry McDonald – percussion (tracks 1–12, 15–16)
- Meia Noite – percussion (tracks 1–12, 15–16)
- Zak Sofaly – percussion (track 10)
- Toby Wright – production, additional vocals (track 7), synth bass (track 9), clarinet and piano (track 10), keyboards (tracks 1–5, 7–16), drum programming (tracks 2–4, 6, 7, 11, 12)

Additional personnel

- Max Cavalera – production
- The Rootsman – remixing and additional production (tracks 15, 16)
- Anders Dohn – production (tracks 13, 14)
- Jacob Langkilde – engineering (tracks 13, 14)
- Jan Sneum – executive production (tracks 13, 14)
- George Marino – mastering
- Andy Wallace – mixing
- Glen La Ferman – photography
- Monte Conner – A&R
- Leo Zulueta – Soulfly logo
- Gloria Cavalera – additional photography, management
- Kevin Estrada – additional photography
- Christina Newport – management
- Oasis Management – management
- Nesta Garrick – cover artwork, package design
- Neville Garrick – cover artwork, package design
- Lance Dean – additional and assistant engineering
- John Watkinson Gray – assistant engineering
- Steve Sisco – mix engineering

== Chart positions ==
Chart (2000)	Peak position
Australian Albums (ARIA)	26
Austrian Albums (Ö3 Austria)	28
Belgian Albums (Ultratop Flanders)	20
Belgian Albums (Ultratop Wallonia)	48
Dutch Albums (Album Top 100)	39
Finnish Albums (Suomen virallinen lista)	22
French Albums (SNEP)	20
German Albums (Offizielle Top 100)	16
Italian Albums (FIMI)	48
New Zealand Albums (RMNZ)	22
Scottish Albums (OCC)	34
Swedish Albums (Sverigetopplistan)	43
Swiss Albums (Schweizer Hitparade)	76
UK Albums (OCC)	45
US Billboard 200	32
US Top Independent Albums (Billboard)	11
