= Tribe (EP) =

EP by Soulfly
- Released: March 5, 1999
- Genre: Nu metal
- Label: Roadrunner
- Producer: Ross Robinson; The Rootsman; Anders Dohn; Jan Sneum

Soulfly chronology
Soulfly (1998)	Tribe (1999)	Primitive (2000)

Tribe is an extended play by American heavy metal band Soulfly. The EP was released in Australia, Japan and the UK.

== Track listing ==
All lyrics are written by Max Cavalera, except "Bleed", written by Max Cavalera and Fred Durst; all music is composed by Max Cavalera.

No.	Title	Length
1.	"Tribe"	4:53
2.	"Quilombo" (Zumbi dub mix)	3:25
3.	"No Hope = No Fear" (live)	4:16
4.	"Bumba" (live)	3:27
5.	"Quilombo" (live)	4:15
6.	"Soulfly" (Eternal Spirit mix)	5:26

Japanese edition bonus CD
No.	Title	Length
1.	"Eye for an Eye"	2:48
2.	"Umbabarauma"	3:54

Australian special tour edition
No.	Title	Length
1.	"Tribe"	4:53
2.	"Quilombo" (Zumbi dub mix)	3:25
3.	"No Hope = No Fear" (live)	4:16
4.	"Bleed" (live)	4:35
5.	"Bumba" (live)	3:27
6.	"Quilombo" (live)	4:15
7.	"Tribe" (Tribal Terrorism mix)	4:18
8.	"Soulfly" (Eternal Spirit mix)	5:26

== Personnel ==
Soulfly

- Max Cavalera – vocals, rhythm guitar, berimbau
- Logan Mader – lead guitar
- Marcello D. Rapp – bass
- Roy Mayorga – drums, percussion

Additional musicians

- Jackson Bandeira – guitar on "Tribe", "Quilombo (Zumbi dub mix)", "Soulfly (Eternal Spirit mix)", "Eye for an Eye", "Umbabarauma"
- Benji Webbe – vocals on "Quilombo (Zumbi dub mix)"
- Ritchie Cavalera – vocals on "Bleed (live)"
- Dayjah – vocals on "Soulfly (Eternal Spirit mix)"
- Jorge Du Peixe – tambora
- Gilmar Bolla Oito – tambora
- Dino Cazares – guitar on "Eye for an Eye"
- Burton C. Bell – vocals on "Eye for an Eye"
- Eric Bobo – percussion on "Umbabarauma"

Additional personal

- Ross Robinson – producer
- The Rootsman – remixed and additional production on "Tribe", "Quilombo (Zumbi dub mix)", "Soulfly (Eternal Spirit mix)"
- Anders Dohn – producer on live tracks
- Jacob Langkilde – engineer on live tracks
- Jan Sneum – executive producer on live tracks
- Josh Abraham – remixed and additional production on "Tribe" (Tribal Terrorism mix)"
- Ross Halfin – photography
- Holger Drees – design

== Charts ==
Chart performance for Tribe
Chart (1999)	Peak position
Australian Albums (ARIA)	55
UK Albums (OCC)	85
