= Discos y Cintas Denver =

- Country of origin: Mexico
- Official website: https://discosycintasdenver.com/

Discos y Cintas Denver (transl. Denver Records & Tapes) is an independent Mexican record label known for their catalogue of underground Mexican rock music, among other less popular genres.

== Catalogue ==
Although their list is extensive, among the most famous groups in the catalogue are:

- El Haragán (also known as Haragán y Compañia or Haragán y Cia)
- Luzbel
- Liran' Roll
- Heavy Nopal
- Transmetal
- Espécimen
- Sindrome Del Punk (Sindrome)
- Banda Bostik
- Charlie Monttana
- Kenny y los Eléctricos
- Leprosy
- Sam Sam
- Anabantha
1. Mantra (Costa Rica)
2. Rotteurs (Rusia)
3. Voltrim (Grecia)
4. Entre otros

Within the new and most recent:

1. Lira N' Roll - Va Por Ti
2. Poder Oculto - Hacia La Libertad
3. 3 Vallejo - Déjame Conocerte
4. California Blues, - Magia
5. Toma II - Tiempo
6. Cer d' Heavy
7. Lvzbel - Tentaciones
8. Dinastía Inmortal - Primer Acto
9. Dinastía Inmortal - Segundo Acto
10. Morante - Danza al Viento
11. Nuits Eternelles - Noche Eterna
12. Trágico Ballet - Del amor y otros Excesos
13. Erszebeth - La Condesa Inmortal
14. Morante - El Vigilante Nocturno
15. María Escarlata - El Misterio
16. Dinastía Inmortal - Tercer Acto
17. Valle de la Muerte - Crónicas Nocturnas
18. Fortaleza - La Fortaleza de la Soledad
19. Anabantha - Hermanos de Sangre
20. Requiem - Falsos Poemas
21. interpuesto-hasta la eternidad

== Important contributions ==
This label also has valuable material rescued from the Mexican rock culture, as the disc's Top Lucifer (EP recorded in 1983 and edited until 1995) and has launched the careers of great bands like Transmetal and Leprosy currently have international fame and groups have shared the stage with the likes of Morbid Angel, Carcass, Rata Blanca, Motörhead, etc. Another major contribution was the reissue of all the albums of Three Souls in My Mind Alejandro Lora band exchange after the name of El Tri. The most outstanding product of this company was, at the time, the double-plate edition of the legendary Avándaro Festival (the Mexican version of Woodstock), which brings together the best of the golden age of Mexican Rock in its infancy (Enigma, The revolution of Emiliano Zapata, and the aforementioned dugs Dug Three Souls in My Mind. In 2007, Records and Tapes Denver, launches Immortal Dynasty, First and Second Act, two compilation albums with the best of the Mexican gothic metal bands. Thus this record becomes the most important and prominent support for the goth metal scene in recent years, launching first Anabantha entire discography and a live album and DVD, filmed in Mexico City Zócalo and then signing Four of the 10 groups Immortal Dynasty: Tragic Ballet (Irapuato, GTO.) Morante (band) (Mexico City), Erszebeth (Mexico City) and Nuits Eternelles (San Pablo A., Tlaxcala), recording and releasing record of these productions. In 2008 Immortal Dynasty launches third with 10 bands. In 2009 he released the records of the bands Requiem (band) (Matehuala, San Luis Potosí) and the Fortaleza (Veracruz) every time a band that more and ba grres Death Valley (band) (Monterrey) involved in the new dynasty. Also the new album comes Anabantha: Blood Brothers. Also upcoming is the release of the DVD and CD Immortal Dynasty Live recorded at Circo Volador, and the fourth act of this recording project.

== Distribution ==
Currently, they distribute discs in Mexico, the United States, Costa Rica, Argentina, among others.

== See also ==
- List of record labels
