= Alfonso Pinzón =

Colombian drummer (born 1972)

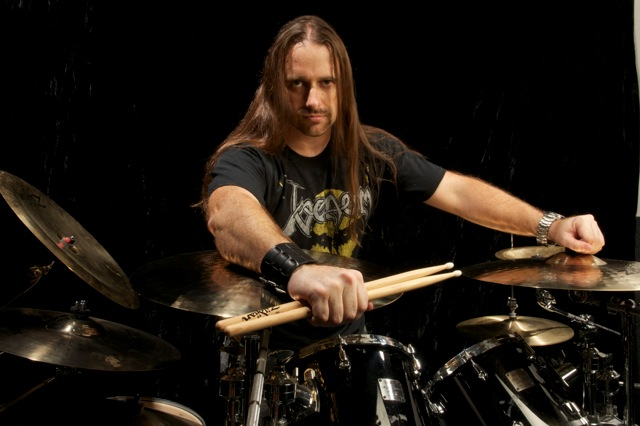
- Pinzón in 2013

Background information
- Born: 27 November 1972 (age 52); Barcelona, Spain
- Genres: Death metal; thrash metal
- Occupation: Musician
- Instrument: Drums
- Years active: 1992–present
- Member of: Agony, Dia De Los Muertos

Alfonso Pinzón (born 27 November 1972) is a Colombian heavy metal drummer and producer. He is known for his work with the bands Agony and Dia De Los Muertos and for founding the Festival del Diablo in Bogotá, Colombia.

== Career ==
Pinzón cofounded the Colombian thrash metal band Agony with and Andrés Jaramillo in 1993. They released several albums before moving to Los Angeles in 1999. In 2005, with Agony on hiatus, Pinzón cofounded the extreme metal band Dia De Los Muertos with Andres Jaramillo and Body Count bassist Vincent Price.

In 2007, Agony regrouped and headlined the festival Rock al Parque in Bogotá, Colombia. They also released the album The Devil's Breath and launched it with a live performance in Bogotá, opening for the black metal band Venom.

Pinzón has produced most of Agony's recordings. He also produced two albums for the American black metal band Inquisition: Ominous Doctrines of the Perpetual Mystical Macrocosm (2010) and Obscure Verses for the Multiverse (2013).

In 2014, Pinzón co-founded the Festival del Diablo in Bogotá, with Jan Pablo Chaparro.

In 2024, Pinzón created La Hora del Diablo, described as the official podcast of Festival del Diablo. The show covers diverse topics related to rock and metal culture and features interviews with musicians and notable figures from the Colombian and Latin American music scenes.

== Discography ==
=== with Agony ===
- Agony (1994)
- Live All the Time (1995)
- Millennium (1996)
- Reborn (2002)
- The Devil's Breath (2009)

=== with Dia de los Muertos ===
- Day of the Dead (2005)
- Satanico – Dramatico (2011)
- No Money – No Fiesta (2014)
