= Son Song =

Single by Soulfly featuring Sean Lennon

from the album Primitive
- Released: January 30, 2001
- Recorded: 1999–2000
- Genre: Nu metal; progressive metal
- Length: 4:17
- Label: Roadrunner
- Songwriter(s): Max Cavalera; Sean Lennon
- Producer(s): Max Cavalera; Sean Lennon; Toby Wright

Soulfly singles chronology
"Back to the Primitive" (2000)	"Son Song" (2001)	"Jumpdafuckup" (2001)

"Son Song" is a song, played as the sixth track of the Soulfly album Primitive. Roadrunner Records released this song in the form of single in 2001, but the album containing this song was released a year before. It is the sixth single released by Soulfly and second from Primitive.

== Song proposal ==
Max Cavalera met Sean Lennon in 1999 during the Big Day Out festival in Australia. While making plans for the album "Primitive", Gloria Cavalera, Max's wife, suggested a collaboration with Lennon.

She thought it would be cool if we sang together; [that] both voices would be amazing. I called Sean, and he was into it. We spent four days on that song; he came to my house, we scribbled around a little bit with the acoustic guitar, then we wrote the lyrics. We took more time on that song, and took it to the studio, and saw the whole thing really come to life, from scratch.

Max said that collaborating with Sean was not necessarily the kind of thing his fans might expect, but given his track record for experimentation, he didn't think it's out of character.

== Lyrics and tribute ==
In this song, co-writers Max Cavalera and Sean Lennon sing about everything turning to dust by screaming at the sky or looking at the sun. Before the song begins, Sean counts to four as first line of lyrics, and then sings the first verse after the song begins. Max sings the choruses starting with 'Dust myself up' while Sean sings the verses containing 'Every moment is precious'.

Despite the song title, the lyrics don't contain 'Son Song', but so-named because it involves sons paying tribute to their deceased fathers by writing and singing the song together. Sean's father, John Lennon, one of the world's most famous singers and songwriters, was murdered at age 40, while Max prays for his father, who died of a heart attack also at age 40 while Max was 9.

== Composition ==
"Son Song" lasts 4:17, but the single version lasts 23 seconds shorter. The first 2½ minutes of this song plays grungy metal riff, with all of the lyrics being sung in this part, and then to mostly vocalless world music part with synthesizers and keyboards, except when Sean talking to Max about how he hurt his fingertip by plucking heavy-gauge guitar strings. Berimbau is playing during the final 11 seconds of the song. The intro and verses are written in 13/8 time signature. The chorus and outro are in 4/4. This may be influenced by a progressive metal oriented sound.

This Soulfly song is noted for having elements similar to Alice in Chains songs due to Sean's similar vocals to Layne Staley, thus with influences of grunge.

== Appearance in the film ==
"Son Song" appears on the Valentine soundtrack as track No. 14, but the only one of 18 songs listed on the track that can't be heard in the film.

== Track listing ==
=== US promo CD ===
No.	Title	Length
1.	"Son Song" (feat. Sean Lennon)	3:54

=== UK promo CD ===
No.	Title	Length
1.	"Son Song" (feat. Sean Lennon)
2.	"In Memory Of..." (feat. Cutthroat Logic)

== Personnel ==
Soulfly

- Max Cavalera – vocals, rhythm guitar
- Marcelo "Cello" Dias – bass, percussion, drums on "In Memory Of..."
- Mikey Doling – lead guitar
- Joe Nuñez – drums

Additional personnel

- Sean Lennon – vocals, guitar, piano, synthesizer and production on "Son Song"
- Babatunde Rabouin – vocals on "In Memory Of..."
- Deonte Perry – vocals on "In Memory Of...", additional drum programming on "Son Song" and "In Memory Of..."
- Justus Olbert – vocals on "In Memory Of..."
- Larry McDonald – percussion
- Meia Noite – percussion
- Max Cavalera – production
- Toby Wright – keyboards and drum programming on "In Memory Of...", production
- Andy Wallace – mixing
- George Marino – mastering
