= Back to the Primitive =

2000 single by Soulfly

Single by Soulfly

from the album Primitive
- Released: December 4, 2000
- Recorded: 1999–2000
- Genre: Nu metal
- Length: 4:22
- Label: Roadrunner
- Songwriter: Max Cavalera
- Producers: Max Cavalera; Toby Wright

Soulfly singles chronology
"Tribe" (1999)	"Back to the Primitive" (2000)	"Son Song" (2001)

Music video
- "Back to the Primitive" on YouTube

"Back to the Primitive" is a song by heavy metal band Soulfly, released in 2000. The song, composed by Max Cavalera, is played as the first track of the second Soulfly album, Primitive.

== Music and lyrics ==
The song features simple downtuned riffs, plus tribal drumming and blabbering; it also plays berimbau to begin the song. Lyrically, this political song is about demoting national government back to local tribal society. Every choruses begin with 'Back to the Primitive', except for the first line of lyric Um, dois, treis, quatro ("one, two, three, four" in Portuguese) to begin the song, and verses containing just "primitive" per line.

== Music video ==
The song begins with a berimbau, but it is not the case for the accompanying music video. Instead, the intro plays tribal percussion with 'Soulfly' chants alternately by Cavalera and spectators; the berimbau is shown, but not heard. The drumming intro lasts 29 seconds, compared to just 23 seconds for the berimbau intro. Interspersed in the video are religious imagery and people of different cultures while the band performs the song in front of an audience. At the end of the video, Ozzy Osbourne makes a cameo by saying "Primitive!" into the camera.

== Track listing ==
All lyrics are written by Max Cavalera except where noted; all music is composed by Max Cavalera.

CD single
No.	Title	Lyrics	Length
1.	"Back to the Primitive"		4:01
2.	"Terrorist" (Total Destruction Mix)	Max Cavalera; Tom Araya	4:39
3.	"Back to the Primitive" (Dub Shit Up Mix)		4:35
Total length:			13:15

- include music video "Back to the Primitive"

UK Promo CD
No.	Title	Length
1.	"Back to the Primitive"	3:58
Total length:		3:58

Canada Promo CD
No.	Title	Length
1.	"Back to the Primitive" (Uncensored Version)	3:58
2.	"Back to the Primitive" (Censored Version)	4:00
Total length:		7:58

Germany Promo CD
No.	Title	Length
1.	"Spineshank – New Disease"	3:16
2.	"Soulfly – Back to the Primitive"	4:20
Total length:		7:36

Promo cassette
No.	Title	Lyrics	Length
1.	"Back to the Primitive"
2.	"Terrorist"	Max Cavalera; Tom Araya

== Personnel ==
Soulfly

- Max Cavalera – vocals, rhythm guitar, berimbau
- Mikey Doling – lead guitar
- Marcello D. Rapp – bass, percussion
- Joe Nuñez – drums

Additional personnel

- Tom Araya – vocals on "Terrorist"
- Max Cavalera – production
- Toby Wright – production
- Andy Wallace – mixing
- The Rootsman – remixing

== Charts ==
Chart (2000)	Peak position
UK Singles (Official Charts Company)	120
