= Soulfly (disambiguation) =

Soulfly is an American heavy metal band.

Soulfly may also refer to:

- Soulfly (Soulfly album), 1998
- SoulFly (Rod Wave album), 2021
