= Tribe (Soulfly song) =

Single by Soulfly

from the album Soulfly
- Released: January 21, 1999
- Recorded: 1997–1998
- Genre: Nu metal
- Length: 6:02
- Label: Roadrunner
- Songwriter(s): Max Cavalera
- Producer(s): Ross Robinson; Josh Abraham; The Rootsman; Roy Mayorga

Soulfly singles chronology
"Bleed" (1998)	"Tribe" (1999)	"Back to the Primitive" (2000)

"Tribe" is the fourth single by heavy metal band Soulfly, released in January 1999. It is played as the ninth track of the eponymous debut album Soulfly, after "Bleed" and before "Bumba". "Tribe" is the fourth and last single of the album. As with every other Soulfly songs with vocals, the lyrics were written by Max Cavalera.

== Lyrics and music ==
The first section of lyrics deal about Zumbi in Portuguese and then tribe in relation to life and god. The last section lists different tribes in alphabetical order, including Aboriginal, Hopi, Māori, and Mohican.

The first minute of this six-minute song plays a berimbau with a man singing a traditional song in Portuguese about Zumbi and his quilombo Palmares's resistance to the Portuguese. Tin can-sounded drums would start before going into churning metal riffs containing power chords, with drums performed during the rest and then played over the riff. Tribal part is played during the last quarter of the song before ending with the same rhythm in metal.

== Track listing ==
All tracks are written by Max Cavalera

No.	Title	Length
1.	"Tribe" (Fuck Shit Up Mix)	5:35
2.	"Quilombo" (Zumbi Dub Mix)	3:24
3.	"Tribe" (Tribal Terrorism Mix)	4:17
Total length:		13:16

== Personnel ==
Band members

- Max Cavalera – vocals, rhythm guitar, berimbau
- Marcello D. Rapp – bass
- Roy Mayorga – drums, percussion

Additional musicians

- Jackson Bandeira – lead guitar
- Gilmar Bolla Oito – tambora
- Jorge du Peixe – tambora
- Chris Flam – programming and engineering on track one
- Benji Webbe – vocals on track two

Additional personal

- Ross Robinson – production
- Roy Mayorga – remixing and additional production on track one
- The Rootsman – additional producer and remixing on track two
- Josh Abraham – additional producer and remixing on track three
- Brian Virtue – mixing on track three
- Holger Drees – design

== See also ==
- Tribe (EP)

== Charts ==
Chart (1999)	Peak position
UK Singles (OCC)	78
UK Rock & Metal (OCC)	2
