= Transmetal =

Transmetal may refer to:

- Transition metals, a group of elements in the periodic table
- Transmetal (band), a Mexican extreme metal band
- Transmetals, a type of Transformer technology in the fictional Transformers universe
