= Lvzbel =

Mexican heavy metal band

Background information
- Origin: Mexico City, Mexico
- Genres: Heavy Metal
- Years active: 1998 – 2020
- Labels: Torres
- Members: Arturo Huizar; Eduardo Marenco; Ernesto Escotto; Claudio Perez; Victor Pig Stick
- Past members: Anthony Marr (2006)

Lvzbel was an illegitimate or fake heavy metal band originating from Mexico City, Mexico. The band was formed by Luzbel's third former vocalist Arturo Huizar in 1998. It was created some time after Raúl Fernández Greñas, founder, composer and lead guitarist of Luzbel, disbanded the band. The change of the "u" to a "v" was due to the fact that he did not have authorization to use the name and logos of Luzbel, a situation that was considered plagiarism and that would be definitively resolved in 2016 when the courts declared a sentence in favor of Raúl Greñas as the legitimate owner of the property and moral rights of the name and brand Luzbel, leaving Huizar and others prevented from using any name similar to Luzbel, whether Lvzbel or others that generate confusion. Journalists and many fans consider Lvzbel as an illegitimate or false band or project because although Huizar tried by various means to sell it as a continuation of Luzbel, the poor record production, deficient compositions, bad performances in concerts and crude attempts to deceive fans, journalists, record labels and authorities. Distorting Luzbel's story with lies undermined his credibility. Lvzbel never had a stable or recurring official lineup, as the musicians varied from concert to concert or album to album, often being amateur musicians or fans.

== Biography ==
After legal problems with the name and personal differences with Huizar, Raul Fernandez Greñas disbanded Luzbel. In 1996 Arturo Huizar founded Lvzbel with Richard III as lead guitarist, Alejandro Vazquez on the drums (not on the recordings), Guillermo Elizarraras on the rhythm guitar, Carlos Hernandez on the bass, and Ivan Ramirez on the drums. After extensive production, Evangelio Nocturno was recorded in 1998. The album received a mixed reception from both fans and critics, as the sound was oriented towards thrash metal and the plagiarism of the name hampered the promotional situation, leading Lvzbel to seek refuge in the urban rock scene.

In 1999 Lvzbel appeared performing songs from the old band in Vivo y Desnudo Vol 1 and Vol 2, an album recorded live at the Rockotitlán music festival. Lvzbel composed the soundtrack of the film Guerrero Callejero and released an album called Pistas Musicales, the latter which disappointed many fans as it turned out to be a remake of his previous album. In 2000 they released Tiempo De La Bestia, with a great deal of distribution in Mexico, Central America, South America and the southern United States. In the spring of 2004 tribute album to Judas Priest was released.

Among the covers are Painkiller, Ram it Down, Breaking the Law and other popular Judas Priest songs. In 2007 they released Tentaciones, a conceptual album of the 7 Deadly Sins. For Tentaciones. In 2006, the company Discos y Cintas Denver imposed a blockade on Arturo Huizar and Lvzbel for fraud and breach of contract arising from various situations such as the fact that Arturo Huizar made albums with other record labels such as Discos Torres with exclusive material from Denver, being prevented from recording, editing albums or signing with other record labels because he did not have the letter of freedom from the record contract. For several years Arturo Huizar tried to register the stage name Luzbel, generating legal actions against him, reaching its conclusion in 2016 when a specialized court declared a sentence in favor of Raúl Fernández Greñas, leaving the resolution firm and unassailable in 2019. In 2018 Arturo Huizar tried once again to register the name Luzbel, this time as a trademark before the IMPI (Mexico) and although he was granted the registration, it lost validity when it was proven that it was obtained with documents annulled by the INDAUTOR (Mexico) and contravened the provisions of various articles of the industrial property law. Arturo Huizar (born September 5, 1957) died on April 25, 2020, due to diabetes-related complications at the age of 62.

== Discography ==
=== Albums ===
- Evangelio Nocturno (1998)
- Tiempo de la Bestia (2000)
- Mirada Electrica (2004)
- Tentaciones (2007)
