= Obscure Verses for the Multiverse =

Studio album by Inquisition
- Released: October 24, 2013
- Recorded: June 10–15, 2013
- Studio: AM Recording Studios, Oxnard, California
- Genre: Black metal
- Length: 45:53
- Label: Season of Mist
- Producer: Alfonso Pinzón

Inquisition chronology
Ominous Doctrines of the Perpetual Mystical Macrocosm (2010)	Obscure Verses for the Multiverse (2013)	Bloodshed Across the Empyrean Altar Beyond the Celestial Zenith (2016)

Obscure Verses for the Multiverse is the sixth full-length studio album by American black metal band Inquisition, released on October 24, 2013, through Season of Mist. The album was recorded over a period of five days, from June 10 to 15, 2013, at AM Recording Studios in Oxnard, California.

== Critical reception ==
Professional ratings
Review scores
Source	Rating
Invisible Oranges	Positive
Loudwire	4/5 stars
Metal Injection	Positive
Metal Hammer	3.5/5 stars
Pitchfork	8.1/10

Obscure Verses was generally well received by critics. Writing for Pitchfork, Kim Kelly described it as "another impressive collection, one that's about as catchy as a pure black metal record has any right to be" and mentioned that the album features "some of Dagon's best guitar work as he manipulates and torments his strings into all manner of eerie tones."

== Track listing ==
No.	Title	Length
1.	"Force of the Floating Tomb"	4:38
2.	"Darkness Flows Towards Unseen Horizons"	3:58
3.	"Obscure Verses for the Multiverse"	5:38
4.	"Spiritual Plasma Evocation"	5:21
5.	"Master of the Cosmological Black Cauldron"	4:44
6.	"Joined by Dark Matter, Repelled by Dark Energy"	6:11
7.	"Arrival of Eons After"	4:12
8.	"Inversion of Ethereal White Stars"	5:40
9.	"Infinite Interstellar Genocide"	5:23
10.	"Where Darkness Is Lord and Death the Beginning" (Bonus track)	6:35
Total length:		52:28

== Personnel ==
Inquisition

- Dagon – guitar, vocals
- Incubus – drums

Additional personnel

- Arthur Rizk – engineer, mixing
- Alfonso Pinzón – producer
- Jeremy Blair – assistant engineer
- Maor Appelbaum – mastering
- Paolo Girardi – cover art
- Adrien Bousson – artwork, layout
- Ivo "Oskar" Osvald – photography
