= Soulfly (Soulfly album) =

Studio album by Soulfly
- Released: April 21, 1998
- Recorded: 1997–1998
- Studio: Indigo Ranch Studios (Malibu, California)
- Genre: Nu metal
- Length: 68:03; 72:50 (digipak)
- Label: Roadrunner
- Producer: Ross Robinson; Richard Kaplan

Soulfly chronology
Soulfly (1998)	Tribe (1999)

Alternative cover
- Digipak edition

Singles from Soulfly
- 1. "Eye for an Eye" Released: February 23, 1998; 2. "Umbabarauma" Released: May 5, 1998; 3. "Bleed" Released: December 23, 1998; 4. "Tribe" Released: January 21, 1999

Professional ratings
Review scores
Source	Rating
AllMusic	4/5 stars
Hit Parader	B
NME	7/10

Soulfly is the debut studio album by American heavy metal band Soulfly, released on April 21, 1998, through Roadrunner Records. The record was released in memory of frontman Max Cavalera's deceased stepson and was the first album featuring Cavalera since leaving Sepultura two years prior. Soulfly has been certified gold by the RIAA. In 2021, the staff of Revolver included the album in their list of the "20 Essential Nu-Metal Albums".

== Background ==
The record features many guests, including members of Nação Zumbi, Fear Factory, Limp Bizkit, Cypress Hill, Deftones, and Dub War.

"The Song Remains Insane" is pieced together by two other songs, opening with a cover of "Caos" by Ratos de Porão and secondly a brief reckless hardcore rendition of "Attitude" by Sepultura. "Umbabarauma" is a cover of a 1976 song by Brazilian musician Jorge Ben Jor, which originally featured on his album África Brasil.

The breakdown riff in "Tribe" originated during Max's time still in Sepultura - most likely created during on-the-road demo jams during the Roots tour though evidently never recorded in any complete demo form. As such, the riff was also used by Sepultura members Andreas Kisser and Igor Cavalera as the main riff to 'Walkman' during their scoring of the movie No Coracao Dos Deuses, recorded the same year as Soulfly's 'Tribe'.

In 2008, speaking to Kerrang!, Max Cavalera remembered:

It was so hard to start over, having been in Sepultura for so long. In fact, it was harder getting Soulfly going than it was getting Sepultura started. Coming into a whole new situation underneath the shadow of Roots was a huge challenge for me, and most people thought I was nuts. Plus, we made a conscious effort not to sound like Sepultura. My choice of musicians took me away from straight metal and into a vibe that embraced a lot more, while still being heavy. Part of the magic was working with some of my all-time favourite Brazilian musicians and that really pushed me to write some great and some very different sounding music. Eye For an Eye is still my favourite, man, and I also like Tribe. That's like an anthem for all metalheads.

== Track listing ==
All lyrics are written by Max Cavalera except where stated; all music is composed by Max Cavalera except where stated.

No.	Title	Lyrics	Music	Length
1.	"Eye for an Eye" (featuring Dino Cazares and Burton C. Bell)			3:35
2.	"No Hope = No Fear"			4:36
3.	"Bleed" (featuring Fred Durst and DJ Lethal)	Max Cavalera; Fred Durst		4:07
4.	"Tribe"			6:02
5.	"Bumba" (featuring Los Hooligans)			3:59
6.	"First Commandment" (featuring Chino Moreno)			4:29
7.	"Bumbklaatt"			3:52
8.	"Soulfly" (instrumental)			4:49
9.	"Umbabarauma" (Jorge Ben Jor cover; featuring Los Hooligans)	Jorge Ben	Jorge Ben	4:11
10.	"Quilombo" (featuring Benji Webbe and DJ Lethal)			3:44
11.	"Fire"			4:21
12.	"The Song Remains Insane"	Max Cavalera; D-Low; João Gordo	Max Cavalera; Gordo; Jaba; Jao	3:40
13.	"No" (featuring Christian Olde Wolbers)			4:00
14.	"Prejudice" (featuring Benji Webbe)	Max Cavalera; Benji Webbe		6:52
15.	"Karmageddon" (containing hidden track "Sultao Das Matas")			5:44
Total length:				68:03

Limited edition
No.	Title	Writer(s)	Length
16.	"Cangaceiro"		2:19
17.	"Ain't No Feeble Bastard" (Discharge cover)	Terence Roberts	1:39
18.	"The Possibility of Life's Destruction" (Discharge cover)	Roberts	1:28
Total length:			72:50

Roadrunner Records 25th anniversary edition
No.	Title	Length
19.	"Blow Away"	4:07
Total length:		76:57

Limited edition digipak bonus disc
No.	Title	Length
1.	"Tribe" (Fuck Shit Up mix)	5:35
2.	"Quilombo" (Extreme Ragga dub mix)	3:23
3.	"Umbabarauma" (World Cup mix)	3:43
4.	"No Hope = No Fear" (live)	4:16
5.	"Bleed" (live)	4:35
6.	"Bumba" (live)	3:27
7.	"Quilombo" (live)	4:08
8.	"The Song Remains Insane" (live)	2:20
9.	"Eye for an Eye" (live at Indigo Ranch)	3:32
10.	"Tribe" (Tribal Terrorism mix)	4:17
11.	"Umbabarauma" (Brasil 70 mix)	4:27
12.	"Quilombo" (Zumbi dub mix)	3:24
13.	"Soulfly" (Eternal Spirit mix)	5:27

Roadrunner Records 25th anniversary reissue bonus disc (live at Roskilde Festival 1998)
No.	Title	Length
1.	"Eye for an Eye (live)"	3:46
2.	"No Hope = No Fear (live)"	4:08
3.	"Spit (live)" (Sepultura cover)	2:44
4.	"Bleed (live)"	4:28
5.	"Beneath the Remains/Dead Embryonic Cells (live)" (Sepultura covers)	3:41
6.	"Tribe (live)"	6:33
7.	"Bumba (live)"	3:10
8.	"Refuse/Resist (live)" (Sepultura cover)	3:43
9.	"Quilombo (live)"	4:00
10.	"Roots Bloody Roots (live)" (Sepultura cover)	3:24
11.	"Attitude (live)" (Sepultura cover)	3:51
12.	"The Song Remains Insane (live)"	3:54
13.	"No (live)"	5:08
14.	"Max Cavalera Spoken Word Performance" (Crossing Border Festival 1997)	17:28
15.	"Spoken Word Jam" (Crossing Border Festival 1997)	4:19
16.	"Eye for an Eye" (4-track demo version)	3:29

== Personnel ==
Soulfly

- Max Cavalera – lead vocals, rhythm guitar, berimbau on "Bleed" and "Tribe", backing vocals on "Bumba" and "Umbabarauma", sitar on "First Commandment" and "Soulfly", talk box on "No Hope = No Fear", agogô on "Fire", chains on "Prejudice"
- Jackson Bandeira (Lúcio Maia) – lead guitar, backing vocals on "Bumba" and "Umbabarauma", zabumba on "Fire"
- Marcello D. Rapp – bass, acoustic bass on "Soulfly", double bass on "First Commandment", backing vocals on "Bumba" and "Umbabarauma"
- Roy "Rata" Mayorga – drums, tambora on "Eye for an Eye", backing vocals on "Bumba" and "Umbabarauma", percussion on "Soulfly", "No" and "Quilombo (Zumbi dub mix)"

Additional musicians

- Dino Cazares – rhythm guitar on "Eye for an Eye"
- Burton C. Bell – backing vocals on "Eye for an Eye"
- DJ Lethal – turntables on "Bleed" and "Quilombo"
- Fred Durst – vocals on "Bleed"
- Gilmar Bolla Oito – alfaia on "Eye for an Eye", "Tribe", "Bumba", "Bumbklaatt", "Umbabarauma", "Quilombo" and "Prejudice", percussion on "Soulfly", backing vocals on "Bumba" and "Umbabarauma", triangle on "Fire"
- Jorge Du Peixe – alfaia on "Eye for an Eye", "Tribe", "Bumba", "Bumbklaatt", "Umbabarauma", "Quilombo" and "Prejudice", percussion on "Soulfly", backing vocals on "Bumba" and "Umbabarauma", chocalho on "Fire"
- Benji Webbe – vocals on "Quilombo" and "Prejudice", chains on "Prejudice", backing vocals on "Bumba"
- Chuck Johnson – backing vocals on "Bumba" and "Umbabarauma", percussion on "Soulfly" and "Karmageddon"
- Eric Bobo – backing vocals on "Bumba" and "Umbabarauma", percussion on "Umbabarauma"
- Los Hooligans – lead and backing vocals on "Bumba", backing vocals on "Umbabarauma"
- Mario Caldato Jr. – backing vocals on "Bumba" and "Umbabarauma"
- Paul Booth – backing vocals on "Bumba" and "Umbabarauma"
- Rob Agnello – backing vocals on "Bumba" and "Umbabarauma"
- Ross Robinson – backing vocals on "Bumba" and "Umbabarauma", percussion on "Soulfly"
- Chino Moreno – vocals on "First Commandment"
- Zyon Cavalera – "You Think You All Good" voice on "Bumbklaatt"
- Christian Olde Wolbers – double bass on "No"
- Chris Flam – additional programming on "Tribe (Fuck Shit Up mix)"
- Logan Mader – lead guitar on live tracks
- Ritchie Cavalera – vocals on "Bleed (live)"
- Dayjah – vocals on "Soulfly (Eternal Spirit mix)"

Production

- Ross Robinson – production, mixing on "Soulfly", "Quilombo", "Cangaceiro", "Ain't No Feeble Bastard" and "The Possibility of Life's Destruction"
- Mario Caldato Jr. – co-production on "Bumba" and "Umbabarauma"
- Andy Wallace – mixing
- George Marino – mastering
- Richard Kaplan – engineering, additional production
- Chuck Johnson – engineering
- Rob Agnello – engineering
- Steve Sisco – assistant mixing
- Anders Dohn – production on live tracks except "Eye for an Eye (live at Indigo Ranch)"
- Jacob Langkilde – engineering on live tracks except "Eye for an Eye (live at Indigo Ranch)"
- Jan Sneum – executive production on live tracks except "Eye for an Eye (live at Indigo Ranch)"
- Soulfly – production on "Eye for an Eye (live at Indigo Ranch)"
- Roy Moyorga – remixing and additional production on "Tribe (Fuck Shit Up mix)", mixing on "Eye for an Eye (live at Indigo Ranch)"
- Chris Flam – engineering on "Tribe (Fuck Shit Up mix)"
- The Rootsman – remixing and additional production on "Quilombo (Extreme Ragga dub mix)", "Quilombo (Zumbi Dub Mix)" and "Soulfly (Eternal Spirit mix)"
- Junkie XL – remixing and additional production on "Umbabarauma (World Cup mix)"
- Josh Abraham – remixing and additional production on "Tribe (Tribal Terrorism mix)"
- Brian Virtue – mixing on "Tribe (Tribal Terrorism mix)"
- Jason Corsaro – remixing and additional production on "Umbabarauma (Brasil '70 mix)"
- Ted Jensen – mastering 1999 reissue bonus CD

Artwork

- Jo Kirchherr – cover photo
- Glen LaFerman and Christy Priske – photography
- Mike Roper and Paul Stottler – label design
- Pawn Shop Press – art direction, design

== Charts ==
Chart performance for SoulFly
Chart (1998)	Peak position
Australian Albums (ARIA)	33
Austrian Albums (Ö3 Austria)	28
Belgian Albums (Ultratop Flanders)	12
Belgian Albums (Ultratop Wallonia)	45
Dutch Albums (Album Top 100)	27
Finnish Albums (Suomen virallinen lista)	18
French Albums (SNEP)	14
German Albums (Offizielle Top 100)	29
New Zealand Albums (RMNZ)	14
Scottish Albums (OCC)	26
Swedish Albums (Sverigetopplistan)	43
UK Albums (OCC)	16
US Billboard 200	79

== Certifications ==
Region	Certification	Certified units/sales
Australia (ARIA)	Gold	35,000^{^}
United States (RIAA)	Gold	500,000^{^}
^{^} Shipments figures based on certification alone.
