= Eye for an Eye (song) =

Single by Soulfly featuring Dino Cazares and Burton C. Bell

from the album Soulfly
- Released: February 23, 1998
- Recorded: 1997–1998
- Genre: Nu metal
- Length: 3:34
- Label: Roadrunner
- Songwriter(s): Max Cavalera
- Producer(s): Ross Robinson

Soulfly singles chronology
"Eye for an Eye" (1998)	"Umbabarauma" (1998)

"Eye for an Eye" is the first single by heavy metal band Soulfly, released in 1998. The song is the first track of the debut album Soulfly. However, "Eye for an Eye" is the tenth single written by Max Cavalera overall. His last single was Sepultura's "Ratamahatta" before he left the band and formed Soulfly. It has become Soulfly's trademark song, and is used at the closing of every Soulfly show since 1998.

The first Soulfly song features Fear Factory members Dino Cazares and Burton C. Bell as guests and plays fast, groovy riff lasting over 3½ minutes.

== Track listing ==
=== Promo single ===
No.	Title	Length
1.	"Eye for an Eye"	3:22
Total length:		3:22

=== Cassette promo single ===
Side one
No.	Title	Length
1.	"Eye for an Eye"

Side two
No.	Title	Length
2.	"Eye for an Eye"

== Personnel ==
Soulfly

- Max Cavalera – vocals, rhythm guitar
- Jackson Bandeira – lead guitar
- Marcello D. Rapp – bass
- Roy "Rata" Moyorga – drums

Additional personnel

- Dino Cazares – rhythm guitar
- Burton C. Bell – vocals
- Jorge Du Peixe – percussion
- Gilmar Bolla Oito – percussion
- Produced by Ross Robinson
- Mixed by Andy Wallace
- Designed by Modino Graphics
- Photographed by Glen La Ferman
