= Cardiel =

Skaterock band

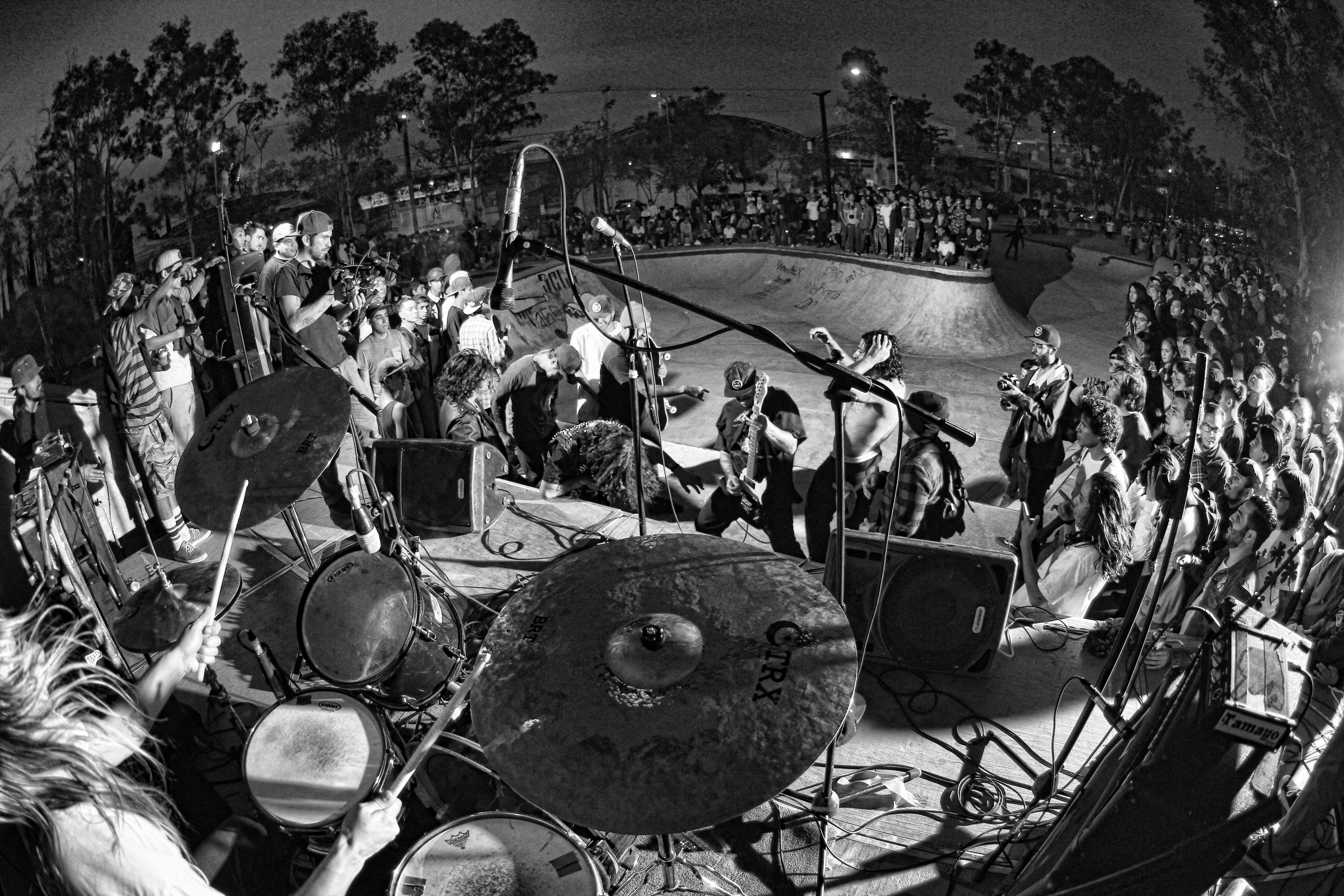
Cardiel performing in Aguascalientes, México 2017

Cardiel is a Skaterock band under the influence of stoner, the psychedelia and heavy dub.

== History ==
Cardiel formed in Mexico City in 2010 by Samantha Ambrosio (drums/vocals) and Miguel Fraino (guitar/vocals). The idea behind the band was to make music for skateboarding videos, achieving the combination between the fast and aggressive to a psychedelic dub. The band has gained notoriety among the skate sub-culture. and has been featured by Thrasher magazine, being the first band from México and Venezuela to be featured with a two page article in the magazine

They have played at important events for the skate community in Mexico, like the 30 years of the Thrasher Magazine party in Mexico, Skate Rock concert tours with Thrasher magazine in Mexico, and the 50 year event of House of Vans in Mexico City.

In addition to being on tour constantly, they have played at various festivals such as Sonic Blast Festival in Portugal in 2019 and at Muddy Roots in 2023 in Tennessee. In 2015 and 2017, they played at the SXSW festival. They have also played the Hell & Heaven Metal Fest in 2018, the Festival Palafoxiano, the Doomed and Stoned Festival Latin America among many others and have been featured on media music shows and throughout Latin America, including Vice Media, Univision and Canal Once (Mexico).

In August 2025 the band recorded "Live on KEXP" at the KEXP studios in Seattle.

On July 27, 2025 the band performed at The Punk Rock Museum

Cardiel is part of the 2026 international festivals lineup like Desertfest in Berlin, Sonic Whip in Netherlands, Obsidian Dust in Brussels and Hoflaerm Open Air in Germany., and the first Venezuelan band to play at Warped Tour

Discography

Live from Tasty Wax Records Oceanside, CA (7" Vinyl) (2024)

Live from "Vesubio Grabaciones" (2024)

Skaterock México (2023)

El Armagedón Afterparty (2022)

Aloha from Fuzz (2017)

En Vivo en Canal Once EMCO (2016)

Local Solo (2014)
