= Agony (band) =

Colombian metal band

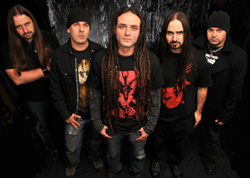
- Agony in 2009. L–R: Alfonso Pinzón, Carlos Marín, César Botero, Andrés Jaramillo, Cello Dias

Background information
- Origin: Bogotá, Colombia
- Genres: Heavy metal; thrash metal; hard rock; speed metal
- Years active: 1993–2002; 2007–present
- Spinoffs: Dia de los Muertos
- Members: Alfonso Pinzón; Andrés Jaramillo; Carlos Marín
- Past members: Ernesto Velasco; Ernesto Robayo; Héctor Lozano; Carlos Reyes; Juanes; Cello Dias; César Botero
- Website: agonyreborn.com

Agony is a Colombian extreme metal band formed in Bogotá in 1993 by Alfonso Pinzon and Ernesto Robayo.

== History ==
The band was founded in 1993 by Alfonso Pinzon and Ernesto Robayo, two university friends who shared a common interest in heavy metal. They recruited two other members, guitarist Andrés Jaramillo and bassist Héctor Lozano. Ernesto Velasco was added last, after auditioning as lead singer. This configuration of the band recorded a self-titled demo tape in 1994, with seven songs.

Robayo and Velasco both left by the end of 1994 and were replaced by Carlos Marín (guitar) and César Botero (vocals). This lineup recorded the concert album Live All the Time in 1995, the first live metal album ever recorded in Colombia. It featured covers of Pantera's "Strength Beyond Strength" and Sepultura's "Propaganda". That year, Agony participated in the inaugural edition of the Bogotá rock festival Rock al Parque.

Agony's first studio album, titled Millennium, was released in 1996 and included new bassist Carlos Reyes. In 1999, the band relocated to Los Angeles, California. Shortly after, Reyes left and was briefly replaced by Juanes. Marín also exited the group around this time.

Agony's second album, Reborn, came out in 2002, after which Botero departed, and the group went on hiatus. In 2004, Jaramillo and Pinzón formed another metal band, Dia de los Muertos. In 2006, Agony reissued Millennium, and a year later, they headlined Rock al Parque for the fifth time.

The band's third album, The Devil's Breath, with Cello Dias on bass, was released in 2009. It was mixed by Canadian guitarist and producer Logan Mader.

== Band members ==
Current

- Alfonso Pinzón – drums
- Andrés Jaramillo – guitar
- Carlos Marín – guitar

Past

- Ernesto Robayo – guitar
- Ernesto Velasco – vocals
- Héctor Lozano – bass
- Carlos Reyes – bass
- Juanes – bass
- Cello Dias – bass
- César Botero – vocals

== Discography ==
Studio albums

- Millennium (1996)
- Reborn (2002)
- The Devil's Breath (2009)

Other albums

- Agony (demo, 1994)
- Live All the Time (live, 1995)
