= Dia de los Muertos (band) =

American metal band

- Origin: Los Angeles, U.S.
- Genres: Death metal; thrash metal
- Years active: 2005–present
- Label: Cinismo Records
- Spinoff of: Agony
- Members: Rosa Arias; Alfonso Pinzón; Andres Jaramillo; Alejandro Corredor
- Past members: Vincent Price; Loana dP Valencia; Adrian Villanueva
- Website: ddlm.net

Dia de los Muertos is an American death/thrash metal band formed in Los Angeles in 2005 by Andres Jaramillo and Alfonso Pinzón, both from the Colombian thrash metal band Agony, and bassist Vincent Price of Body Count. To date, the band has released two EPs and one full-length studio album.

== History ==
Guitarist Andres Jaramillo and drummer Alfonso Pinzón of Agony, and Vincent Price of Body Count, created the band as a side project. Lacking a vocalist, they invited singers to write lyrics and record vocals over their music.

Their first release, the Day of the Dead EP, was recorded at Dungeon Studios in Los Angeles, mixed by Roy Z, and released on Cinismo Records in 2005. It featured vocals by Tony Campos (Static-X, Fear Factory), Andres Gimenez (A.N.I.M.A.L.), Loana dP Valencia (Dreams of Damnation), and Alex Oquendo (Masacre).

In 2006, Dia De Los Muertos performed at the Colombian rock festival Rock al Parque in Bogotá.

In 2011, the band issued their debut full-length album, Satanico-Dramatico, with singer Loana dP Valencia, guitarist Adrian Villanueva, and bassist Alejandro Corredor.

In 2013, Dia De Los Muertos embarked on a Latin American tour, with Mexican singer Rosa Arias joining the band. They performed at the Metal Fest in Santiago, Chile, Teatro Flores in Buenos Aires, Argentina—opening for Carcass, Hell & Heaven Metal Fest in Guadalajara, Mexico, and Del Putas Fest in Medellín, Colombia. The band returned to Mexico, then headed to Europe to play Resurrection Fest in Spain.

A year later, Dia De Los Muertos released their next record, the EP No Money – No Fiesta.

== Band members ==
Current

- Alfonso Pinzón – drums
- Andres Jaramillo – guitar
- Alejandro Corredor – bass
- Rosa Arias – vocals

Past

- Vincent Price – bass
- Loana de Valencia – vocals
- Adrian Villanueva – guitar

== Discography ==
EPs

- Day of the Dead (2005)
- No Money – No Fiesta (2014)

Studio albums

- Satanico-Dramatico (2011)
