= Espina (band) =

Mexican hard rock/metal band

- Origin: Querétaro City, Querétaro, México
- Genres: Heavy metal; hard rock
- Years active: 2007–present
- Label: Antigua Records
- Members: Pedro Espinosa; Julio Resendiz; Tony Cortés; Daniel Valencia
- Past members: Rafael de Alma; Andrés Sigler; Cesar Simón; Manuel Fernández; Fernando Núñez
- Website: espinaoficial.com

Espina is a hard rock/metal Mexican band based in Querétaro, formed in 2007. In 2015 the band recorded their first studio album called Origen. It was released in 2016, produced by José Pastas Padillas in Antiqua Recordings, with Hector Carrión, José Pastas Padilla and Fernando Nuñez involved in the production.

Espina current lineup comprises founding members Tony Cortés (drums), and Pedro Espinosa (guitar) along with Andres Sigler (vocals), Rafael de Alma (guitar) and bassist Daniel Valencia. The band has shared a stage with several national and International bands such as Lost Acapulco, Jumbo, Transmetal, El Gran Silencio, Panteón Rococó, Molotov, El Tri, Babasónicos, Supremacy, Killcode, DragonForce, Epica, Five Finger Death Punch, Rammstein and Megadeth.

== Background ==
Tony Cortés and Pedro Espinosa met in school. They started to compose some songs together. Cesar Simón was included in the band in 2007 due to previous works on other rock bands. First Espina tracks were created in this year, such as "Nos Iremos" and "Nueva Era" Manuel Fernández was incorporated to the band later.

The band's name was conceived when the members were trying to search for a Spanish name that would resemble the national identity of their country, melded with an organic and aggressive sense. Additional songs such as "Alison", "Sed", "Sálvame", "Ayer" and "Abismos" were written under Espina name. First band demo "Raíces" in 2009.

Andrés Sigler, a friend of Cesar Simón was added to the band as main vocals. Before this, Pedro and Cesar himself were the vocalists. Three new songs: "Cicatriz", "Sueño infiel" and "Fractura" were created with Andrés involved. They recorded their first EP "Nueva Era" in 2012, which was promoted in Querétaro and other cities from The Bajío region.

=== First Studio Album "Origen" ===
At the end of 2014, Espina started to record their first studio "Origen" under Antiqua Recordings. On that year, Manuel withdrew from the band and Fernando Nuñez replaced him on bass.

Production was finished in 2015 and promotion starts early 2016 in Guadalajara and Querétaro. At the same time, Fernando decides to leave the band and Daniel Valencia replaced him.

=== Road to Corona Hell and Heaven ===
With their first studio album, Espina started to reach more stages in The Bajío and other cities around Querétaro. They entered the national metal contest Road to Corona Hell & Heaven 2016 (RTCHH) to gain a spot in the lineup as first place, in one of the two main stages.

1,130 bands from all the country signed up for the contest. 210 bands were selected to perform semi-finals between May and June 2016. Another semi-finals in five large regions took place to select the finalists and on July 9 Espna was declared the winner. The bands that participated in the finals were: Don't worry be devil (Cancún), Herencia de Honor (Obregón), Coventrate (Monterrey), Void (Chihuahua), Mi Maldito Grupo Sangre (Chihuahua), What I've become (Torreón), Cyclic Enigma (Mexico City), Bellum (Aguascalientes), Uhkumo (Michoacán), Legacy (León) & Becoming Ashes (Cancún).

Hell & Heaven Fest 2016 took place on July 23, 2016, at Autódromo Hermanos Rodríguez venue Espina performed as opener act in the Hell main stage.

== After Hell and Heaven ==
Espina was selected as supporting act for Megadeth in September 2016.

Espina was a finalist in WOA Metal Battle for Wacken México 2017 contest.

Cesar Simón left the band on mid-year 2017 and Rafael De Alma from Diamante Rojo band was selected as a replacement.

Espina was selected by Eyescream productions as supporting act for DragonForce for their presentation at Auditorio Nacional in Mexico City, on September 6, 2017.

On 2019, Julio entered the band replacing Rafael, due to scheduling conflicts with Diamante Rojo band, in which Rafael was still active.

On April 28, Espina announced that Andrés was leaving the band on its Facebook page.

== Discography ==
Studio albums

- Origen (2016)

EPs

- Nueva Era (2012)
