= Ponta de Lança Africano (Umbabarauma) =

1976 song by Jorge Ben Jor

Song by Jorge Ben Jor

from the album África Brasil
- Language: Portuguese
- Released: 1976
- Genre: Samba funk
- Songwriter: Jorge Ben Jor

"Ponta de Lança Africano (Umbabarauma)" is a Brazilian song by Jorge Ben Jor from his 1976 album África Brasil. It was later recorded by Ambitious Lovers and Soulfly. The song is about an African striker, and became a well known football-related track. It has been described as "[possibly] one of the best songs about sports ever written", and prompted one writer to state that "Jorge Ben should be considered the poet laureate of soccer songwriting".

It was included on David Byrne's 1989 compilation Brazil Classics: Beleza Tropical, prompting rotation of a video for the track on VH-1. The original version of the track was used in the documentary film Di/Glauber.

It was released as a single in 1989 by EMI Records, backed with another track from the Beleza Tropical album, Nazaré Pereira's "Maculele".

In 2021, Rolling Stone ranked it number 351 in its updated list of the 500 Greatest Songs of All Time.

== Ambitious Lovers version ==
"Ponta de Lança Africano (Umbabarauma)"

Single by Ambitious Lovers

from the album Lust
- Released: 1991
- Label: Elektra
- Songwriter: Jorge Ben Jor

Ambitious Lovers recorded a cover of the song on its Lust album. A 12-inch single of remixes of the track (listed on the label as simply "Umbabarauma") by Charley Casanova and Goh Hotodain was released by Elektra Records in 1990, which became a dance hit, peaking at no. 10 on the Billboard Dance Music/Club Play Singles chart.

=== Track listing ===
- "Umbabarauma" (World Beat Club Mix) – 5:08
- "Umbabarauma" (Jorge Meets Junior House Dub) – 6:20
- "Umbabarauma" (Mix Da Verdade) – 4:27
- "Umbabarauma" (Cassanova's Kickin' House Mix) – 6:47
- "Umbabarauma" (Lemon Tree Basement Dub) – 7:36

== Soulfly version ==
"Umbabarauma"

Single by Soulfly featuring Los Hooligans

from the album Soulfly
- Released: 5 May 1998
- Recorded: 1997–1998
- Genre: Nu metal
- Length: 4:46
- Label: Roadrunner
- Songwriter: Jorge Ben Jor
- Producer: Ross Robinson

Soulfly singles chronology
"Eye for an Eye" (1998)	"Umbabarauma" (1998)	"Bleed" (1998)

Heavy metal band Soulfly recorded a cover version of the song, as "Umbabarauma", released as the band's second single in 1998, taken from the debut album Soulfly.

=== Track listing ===
==== Maxi-single ====
No.	Title	Length
1.	"Umbabarauma" (LP Mix)	4:13
2.	"Umbabarauma" (World Cup Mix)	3:45
3.	"Tribe" (Extended Version)	5:54
4.	"Umbabarauma" (World Cup Mix – Instrumental)	3:38
Total length:		17:30

==== Promo CD ====
No.	Title	Length
1.	"Umbabarauma"

=== Personnel ===
Regular Soulfly members

- Max Cavalera – vocals, rhythm guitar
- Jackson Bandeira – lead guitar
- Marcello D. Rapp – bass
- Roy "Rata" Moyorga – drums

Additional personnel

- Eric Bobo – percussion
- Jorge Du Peixe – tambora
- Gilmar Bolla Oito – tambora
- Produced by Ross Robinson

=== Charts ===
Chart (1998)	Peak position
UK Singles (Official Charts)	83
