= Inquisition (metal band) =

Colombian-American black metal band

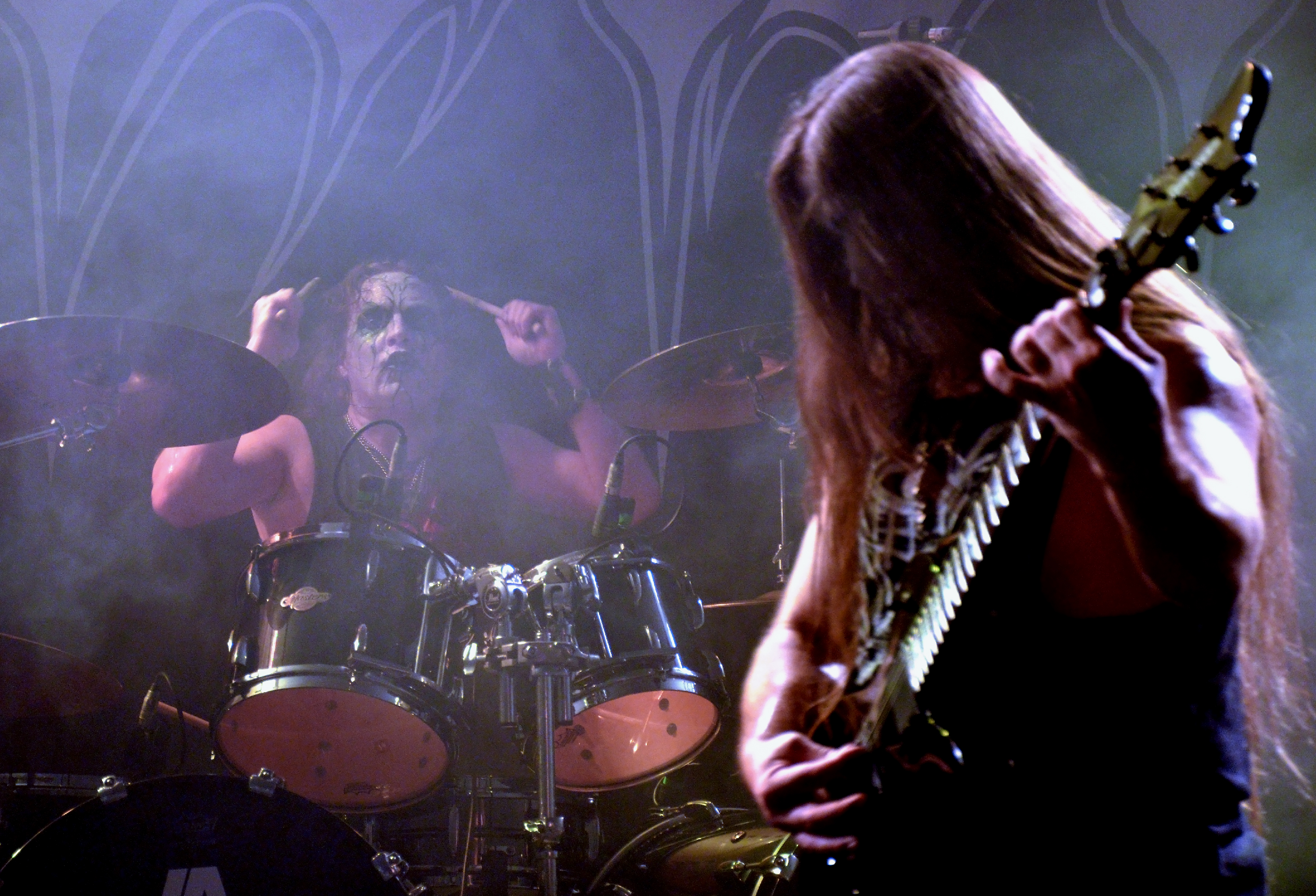
- Inquisition performing in 2016

Background information
- Origin: Cali, Colombia
- Genres: Thrash metal (early); Black metal
- Years active: 1988–present
- Labels: Sylphorium; Defiled, War Hammer; Nuclear War Now!; No Colours; Season of Mist; Agonia
- Members: Dagon; Incubus
- Past members: See below

Inquisition is a Colombian-American black metal band formed in Cali, Colombia, in 1988, and later relocated to Seattle, Washington. It has two members, Dagon (vocals, guitar) and Incubus (drums), and does not feature a bassist.

The band had a thrash metal sound on its earliest recordings, but incorporated black metal influences on its 1996 extended play Incense of Rest.

== History ==
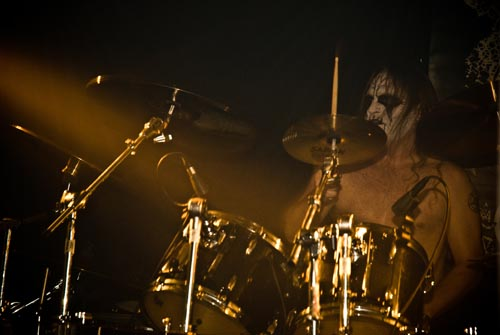
Live at Hole in the Sky 2008

Dagon formed Inquisition in 1988 in Cali, Colombia, as thrash metal act Guillotine. The band changed their name to Inquisition in 1989. The name was chosen because it represented humanity's "need to establish dominance, control and order based on a particular period of our world's history." Dagon viewed this historical event as emblematic of "man's [general] need to impose his rule over others." In 1996, Dagon relocated to the United States and recruited drummer Incubus and bassist Debandt. Debandt departed the band shortly after the release of Inquisition's full-length debut, Into the Infernal Regions of the Ancient Cult, in 1998. Dagon and Incubus recorded all subsequent releases as a duo.

Dagon has suggested that the band's formation in Colombia and subsequent development in the United States affected Inquisition's sound. Observing that "Many second and third world countries have an environment in them that suits Black Metal and Death Metal perfectly", Dagon explained that "life in some of them mean nothing. The high social tension and rebellion in those areas of the world only intensify this music and make 'evil' much more of a reality." Recalling "seeing people get shot and stabbed [by] the Cali and Medellín Cartel", Dagon portrayed the environment surrounding the band's formative years as "true darkness in flesh and blood." He described Inquisition as combining "the South American attitude" with "the musicianship and skills of the European scene." Dagon later downplayed geographic and cultural influences in favour of emphasizing the band's metaphysical inspiration: "I don't think of anything particular in our music as being rooted in a particular area culturally. Sure, there can be external influences based on geographical location, or your heritage can play a role, but in this band's case it just doesn't happen. We keep things detached from that and aim for a sound that is inspired from a much more distant and mystical element."

In 2012, the band signed with the French label Season of Mist. The band's label debut, Obscure Verses for the Multiverse, was released on October 25, 2013 (October 29 in North America). Their seventh album Bloodshed Across the Empyrean Altar Beyond the Celestial Zenith was released on August 26, 2016. On January 22, 2018, the band released an official bootleg live album titled Demonic Ritual in Unholy Blackness; the performance took place in Padua, Italy on September 25, 2010. The live album was released by the Italian label The Oath in collaboration with Land of Fog and White Wolf Productions.

=== Child pornography accusations ===
On March 26, 2018, the band was dropped from Season of Mist, from a tour with Satyricon, and from that year's Maryland Deathfest as former allegations of possession of child pornography from 2008 were brought up against Dagon. As revealed to be in the public record by metal news website MetalSucks, Dagon pleaded guilty to Unlawful Display of Sexually Explicit Material and Obstructing a Law Enforcement Officer in a plea bargain after the National Center for Missing & Exploited Children detected an account uploading sexually explicit photographs of "young females in their early teens or pre-teens" to the photo-sharing website Photobucket in November 2006, the account being traced to Dagon. A subsequent investigation of his computer revealed as many as 2,000 files recovered depicting Inquisition, Dagon and his wife, and more child pornography, involving both young girls and boys. Enough of the latter category existed to fill four DVDs with images and videos. The charges did not require him to register on the Washington Sex Offender Public Registry.

=== Recent efforts ===
In the aftermath of the resurfaced allegations against Dagon, the band went silent on their social media for the majority of 2018, however in late December of that year the band announced on their Facebook that they had started working on new music. A year later in late December 2019, they announced they had completed recording their next album. On November 11, 2020, the band released a music video for their song "Luciferian Rays" to promote their next album.

The band's eighth full-length album Black Mass for a Mass Grave was released on November 20, 2020, through Agonia Records. According to the band's website, the album was recorded, mixed and mastered between August and September 2019. The band resumed their live activities in 2022, their first live show in over four years took place at Steelfest on Finland, and embarked on a Latin America tour on October.

== Musical style ==
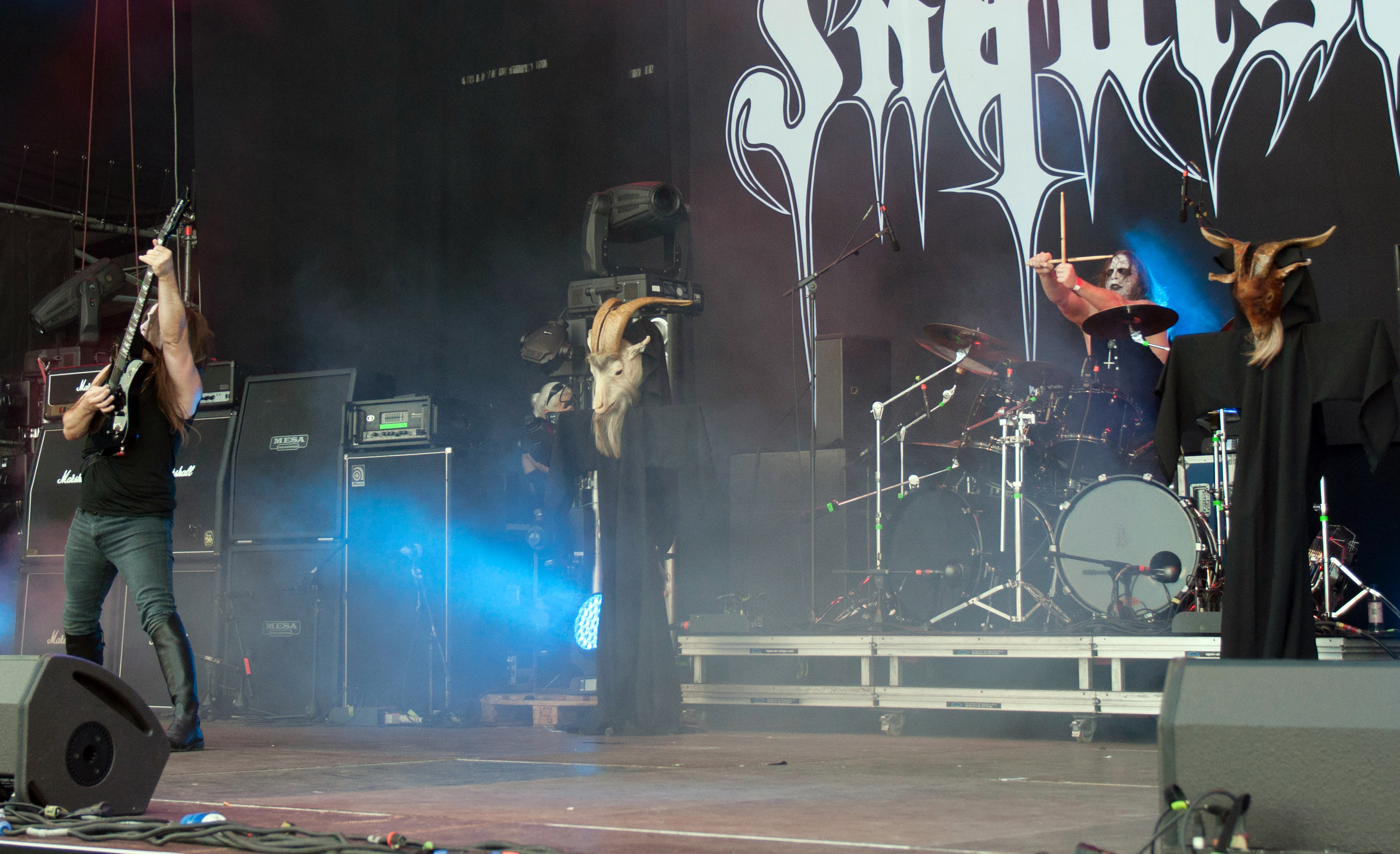
Inquisition at Party.San Open Air 2014

Inquisition started as a thrash metal band in the vein of Sodom and Kreator, but became increasingly oriented towards black metal. Dagon explained that thrash "had gotten stagnant", which led him towards black metal as it was a "guitar-driven" form of music that did not sound so "dated" and "uninteresting". The band described their sound as black metal with "slow, deep and dark riffing", "sudden tempo changes", and "melodic solo[ing]". These stylistic elements were mixed with "old school thrash metal-influenced riffs", "darker and more chaotic black metal", and "fast, tremolo picked minor-key guitar riffs". The band has cited Bathory's The Return...... as well as the music of Burzum, Immortal and Polish black metal as influential.

Inquisition's recordings have not featured a bass guitar since their debut, Into the Infernal Regions of the Ancient Cult. Dagon explained that he and Incubus "had too many problems finding a bass player years ago" and gave reasons ranging from drug addiction to the absence of a complementary ideological orientation. He said that he plays his guitar in such a way that the bass is unnecessary:

We have the bare minimum needed to create Satanic music in the form of Black Metal: a guitar, drums and a voice. With this simplistic formula, I believe that this adds to the magic of our hymns. You can do so much with so little, it is all about how creative you can or want to be, it is about your capabilities.

Dagon has said that his vocals are intentionally inhuman in order to represent an unseen demonic entity that conveys the lyrical themes. While some critics have described Dagon's singing style as "reptilian", Metal Hammer journalist Robert Müller compared Dagon's voice to Kermit the Frog. Responding to the comparison, Dagon described the intent and history of his approach:

Back in the day when I was thinking about a vocal style for Inquisition, I came to the conclusion that I did not want something screamed out at [the] top [of my] lung[s]. So many people were doing that, and still are, and identity is important to me, so I figured what can I do that the majority are not doing; meanwhile I kept hearing this idea in my head of a spoken like inhuman form of vocals chanting over very heavy and at times fast music creating a contrast. That's why when people say it sounds like a frog or anything else I feel I obtained what I wanted, I achieved that goal of keeping the human factor out of the vocal chants.

Dagon cited early Graveland and Mayhem's De Mysteriis Dom Sathanas as influential to his vocal approach.

Another notable element of the Inquisition sound is Incubus' blast beat style, in which the snare works together with the hi-hat or ride while alternating the two bass drums, as opposed to alternating the snare and kick, the more traditional form. This style is somewhat uncommon in black metal, being used much more prevalently in death metal.

Over time, the band's compositions have become increasingly complex. Dagon has referenced Baroque composers as among his greatest inspirations:

The greatest composers of the Baroque period inspire me a great deal, more so than any other form of music. The flamboyant and excessively tonal and predictable style of that period's music amazes me more than any other period in the universe of music. The Baroque composers took music to a level never seen or heard before, light years ahead of its time, and also served as the core of inspiration and influence on the period that followed. The masters never feared taking expression to the highest levels amidst the complexity of their compositions, and they did not let technique get in the way of feeling. They were perfectly balanced in technique and emotion, two worlds merged into one masterpiece. Music is expression and should be a sophisticated tool for displaying the different levels of the human mind which go unseen.

== Religion and ideology ==
Dagon defines black metal as "music that speaks for Satan, prov[ing] the existence of its force...Black Metal in essence must begin with the recognition of Satan as the foundation of the Black Metal code. This is where Black Metal began and this is how it must be, always, there should be no doubts." He described black metal as Satan expressed "through sound waves" and affirmed "individualism, elitism, rebellion against unnecessary control, pride with a cause" as virtues celebrated by Satanism. Dagon cited "demonic art" such as "old diabolic woodcuts made in times when Satan was a real threat to people" as well as books on the occult, black magic, and demonology as lyrical inspirations. Dagon's lyrics are overtly Satanic, and address both theistic and LaVeyan forms of Satanism as well as pre-Christian incarnations of evil, such as Baphomet (whom he describes as "the mysterious war god demon of the Templars") and demons from Babylonian religion.

Over time, Inquisition incorporated increasingly cosmic and metaphysical themes into its music. Dagon confirmed that these themes represent an extension and elaboration of Satanism. For Dagon, the "energy" of Satan is "everywhere", including the "cosmic dust that [forms] the ground we walk on and even who we are. Every cosmic molecule is in you and will eventually crumble and die, recycling itself back with the stars...space in general is simply the most real heaven and the most real hell you will ever come across alive or dead."

Inquisition has been accused of being a Nazi/white supremacist band or at least having racist band members. Band frontman Jason "Dagon" Weirbach had an electronic/noise side project called 88MM. The project was named after the 8.8 cm Flak 18/36/37/41 artillery weapon employed by Nazi Germany during Spanish Civil War and World War II. 88 is also frequently used by neo-Nazis as a numerical code for "HH", with H represented as the eight letter in the English alphabet, standing for "Heil Hitler". 88MM was included on the compilation called Declaration of Anti-Semetic [sic] Terror with the track "14 Showerheads, 1 Gas Tight Door". The compilation was released by white supremacist record label Satanic Skinhead Propaganda. Antichrist Kramer, who owns the label, has also drawn the cover art of all Inquisition albums from 2004 to 2010. Inquisition also appeared on a compilation CD called From Colombia with Hate by Sylphorium Records. In the booklet of the CD, there is an image of the band in front of a Nazi flag.

== Band members ==
=== Current ===
- Dagon – guitars, vocals (1988–present)
- Incubus – drums (1996–present)

=== Past ===
- John Santa – drums (1988–1994)
- Endhir Xo Kpurtos – drums (1996)
- Debandt – bass (1998)
- Cesar Santa – bass (1989)
- Carlos Arcila – keyboards, flute (1996)

== Discography ==
=== Studio albums ===
- Into the Infernal Regions of the Ancient Cult (1998)
- Invoking the Majestic Throne of Satan (2002)
- Magnificent Glorification of Lucifer (2004)
- Nefarious Dismal Orations (2007)
- Ominous Doctrines of the Perpetual Mystical Macrocosm (2010)
- Obscure Verses for the Multiverse (2013)
- Bloodshed Across the Empyrean Altar Beyond the Celestial Zenith (2016)
- Black Mass for a Mass Grave (2020)
- Veneration of Medieval Mysticism and Cosmological Violence (2024)

=== Live albums ===
- Demonic Ritual in Unholy Blackness (2018)

=== EPs, demos, splits and compilations ===
- Anxious Death (1990, EP)
- Forever Under (1993, demo)
- Incense of Rest (1996, EP; later released as a split with Profane Creation)
- Summoning the Black Dimensions in the Farallones / Nema (1996, split album with Profane Creation)
- Unholy Inquisition Rites (2004, EP; preview of Magnificent Glorification of Lucifer featuring two raw mixes, a rehearsal track, and a live song)
- Anxious Death/Forever Under (2004, compilation)
