= Bleed (Soulfly song) =

1998 single by Soulfly

Single by Soulfly featuring Fred Durst and DJ Lethal

from the album Soulfly and Faust: Love of the Damned: Original Soundtrack
- Released: December 23, 1998
- Recorded: 1997–1998
- Genre: Nu metal; rap metal
- Length: 4:06
- Label: Roadrunner
- Songwriters: Max Cavalera; Fred Durst
- Producer: Ross Robinson

Soulfly singles chronology
"Umbabarauma" (1998)	"Bleed" (1998)	"Tribe" (1999)

Music video
- "Bleed" on YouTube

"Bleed" is the third single by heavy metal band Soulfly, released in 1998 from the self-titled album Soulfly. Limp Bizkit guest members Fred Durst and DJ Lethal sing this song about pain, lying and madness with lyrics written by Durst and Max Cavalera. This song tributes Cavalera for the untimely death of his stepson Dana.

"Bleed" was the first music video released by Soulfly. Scenes include a fight including strangling, guest singer Durst jumped, and driving with shattered windshield on the driver side of a car.

In 2017, Annie Zaleski of Spin named it the 22nd-best nu metal track of all time. In 2022, Eli Enis of Revolver included the song in his list of the "10 Heaviest Nu-Metal Songs of All Time".

== Track listing ==
=== Maxi-single ===
No.	Title	Length
1.	"Bleed"	4:07
2.	"No Hope = No Fear"	4:37
3.	"Cangaceiro"	2:19
4.	"Ain't No Feeble Bastard" (Discharge cover)	1:38
Total length:		12:41

=== Promo CD ===
No.	Title	Length
1.	"Bleed"	4:07
Total length:		4:07

== Personnel ==
Soulfly

- Max Cavalera – vocals, rhythm guitar, berimbau on track one, talk box on track two
- Jackson Bandeira – lead guitar
- Marcello D. Rapp – bass
- Roy "Rata" Moyorga – drums, percussion

Additional personnel

- Fred Durst – vocals on track one
- DJ Lethal – scratches on track one
- Jorge Du Peixe – percussion on track three
- Gilmar Bolla Oito – percussion and triangle on track three
- Produced by Ross Robinson

== Charts ==
Chart (1998)	Peak position
Finland (Suomen virallinen lista)	8
Scotland Singles (OCC)	95
UK Singles (OCC)	83
