= Stoneflex =

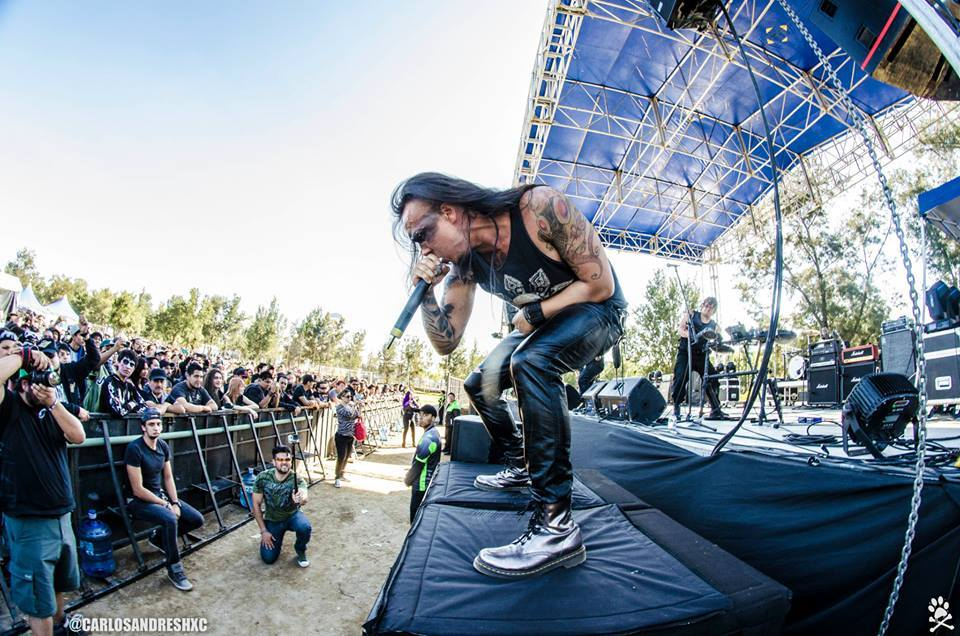
- Jhiro Cryptor from Stoneflex

Background information
- Origin: Bogota, Colombia
- Genres: Industrial metal
- Website: www.stoneflexband.com

Stoneflex is an industrial metal band formed in Bogota, Colombia in 2006. The group was founded by the lead singer and multi-instrumentalist Jhiro Cryptor (aka Jhiro Rz) (Jairo Sarmiento), who was formerly the vocalist of the South American band Koyi K Utho. The name Stoneflex is derived from critical lyrics on religion, morality, philosophy and existentialism; displaying fondness for irony and aphorism. They Count with a long list of international awards in their career as "The Best New Band" in Rolling Stone Argentina 2008.

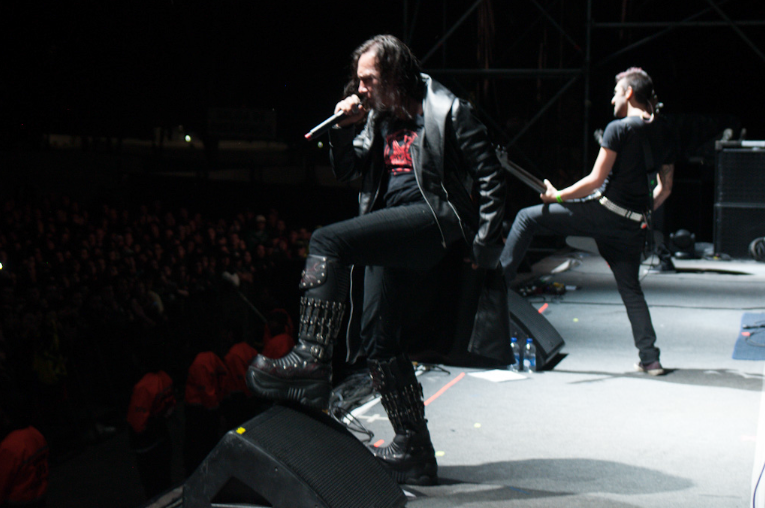
Stoneflex 2013 Black Sabbath 13 Tour

== History ==
Stoneflex was formed in Bogota, Colombia in 2006. The group was founded by the lead singer Jhiro Cryptor AKA Jhiro Rz (former vocalist of South American band “Koyi K Utho”). The name Stoneflex is derived from critical lyrics on religion, morality, philosophy and existentialism; displaying fondness for irony and aphorism. In 2006, new members joined Stoneflex, each one coming from different local bands -- Dr. Stinky (Carlos Escobar - Stained Glory) lead guitar, and Zetha (Javier Sarmiento - Koyi K Utho) drums, sequences, and production.

In 2008, Jhiro spent several months in Buenos Aires, Argentina, where the band took force thanks to the collaboration of members of local mainstream industrial bands, such as “Knife God”, “Jazmine Lasciva”, “Shocker Stalin”, “Latex” and “Jesus Martyr”. The Band ended its tour in Argentina performing in venues such as CBGB, Speed King, Green Hell, Lounge Pueyrredon, the Roxy, and La Trastienda. Stoneflex also appeared as special guests in several international tattoo conventions. The band quickly gained mainstream popularity. The same year, Rolling Stone Magazine (Argentina), awarded Stoneflex the “Best New Band of the Year”.

In 2009 the band returned to Colombia with their first album titled “REBORN”, which was well received by critics and listeners, selling out within the first couple of months of release. In the same year the band occupied a top spot in Shock magazine as one of the best rock bands. In 2010 the band released the video for their song "Psychopath Reborn ", from the album "REBORN", it was nominated for “Best Metal Video” in the Shock Music Awards. This same year they played the biggest festival in Latin America called "Rock al Parque" alongside bands/musicians like Andrés Calamaro, Ki-Mani Marley, Mutemath, Zoé, Puya, Shadows Fall, Biohazard, and Samael. Stoneflex was invited back and played again at “Rock al Parque” in 2013 with Cannibal Corpse, Symphony X, Havok, Downset, and Anti-Nowhere League.

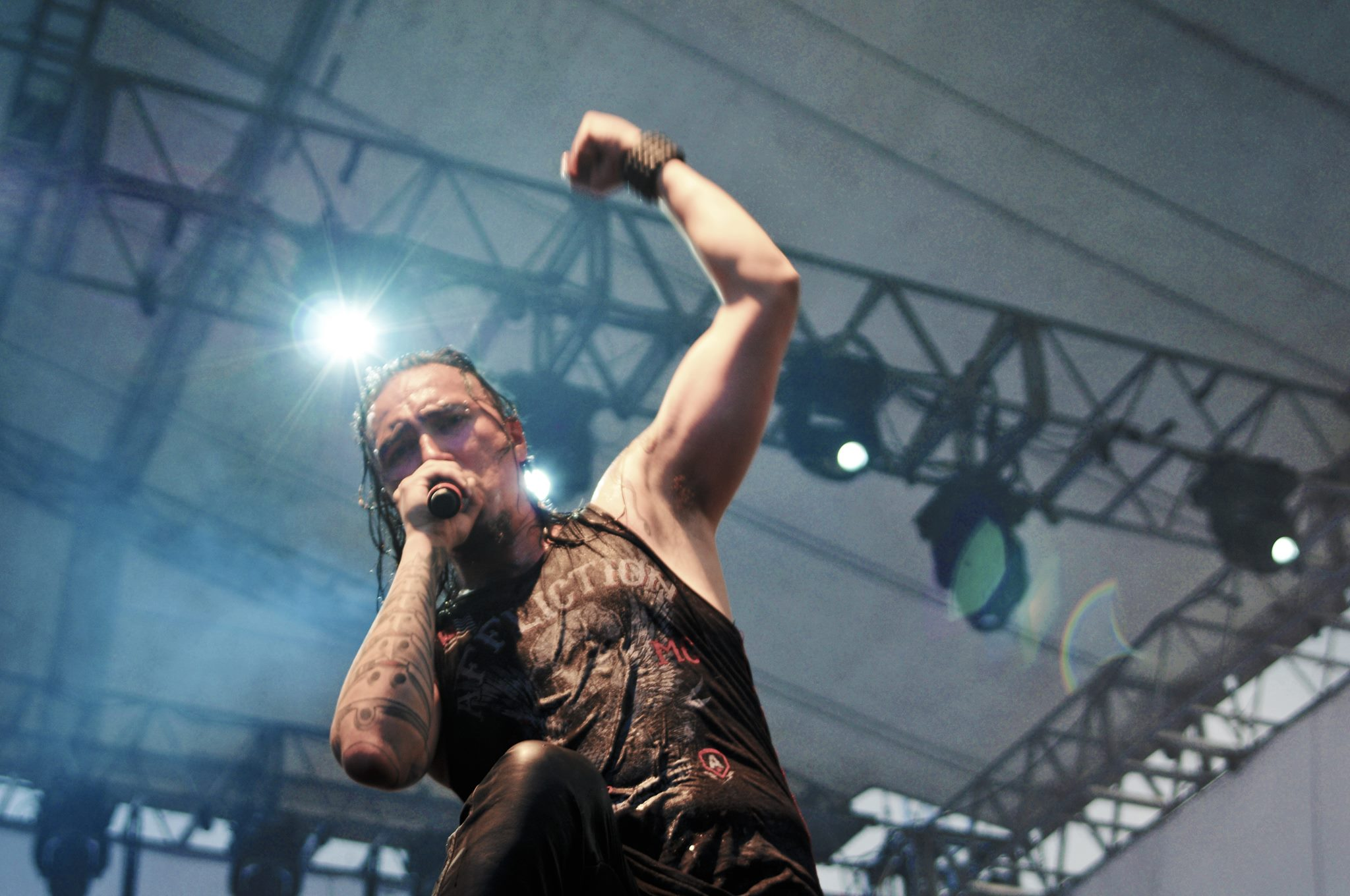
Jhiro Cryptor, Stoneflex 2015

In 2013, Stoneflex was chosen by Ozzy Osbourne to play as the opening band for Black Sabbath in the Latin American "13" tour, this tour also featured special guest Megadeth. In 2014, Stoneflex played in one of the biggest metal fests in the world, the “Corona Hell and Heaven Metal Fest”, with Kiss, Korn, Rob Zombie, Opeth, Limp Bizkit, Venom, Annihilator, Samael, U.D.O., Obituary, Rotting Christ, Havok, Cephalic Carnage, Overkill, Terrorizer, Angra, and many others. During the Festival, Stoneflex released the new video for their song “Reflecting” from the “REBORN” album. In May 2015, Stoneflex received the “Best Metal Band” award at the Subterranica Awards show.
