= Luzbel =

Mexican heavy metal band

- Origin: Mexico City, Mexico
- Genres: Heavy metal, hard rock
- Years active: 1982–1990, 1993–1997, 2004–2006, 2012–present
- Labels: Sony Music, Warner Music
- Members: Raul Fernandez Greñas – Guitars; Humberto Vazquez – Bass; Mike Glez – Vocals; Randy Corona – Drums
- Website: https://www.facebook.com/LuzbelOficialMexico https://twitter.com/LuzbelOficial https://www.instagram.com/luzbeloficial https://www.youtube.com/user/LuzbeloficialMexico https://jorgecuriel.com/Band/Luzbel https://www.facebook.com/Raul-Greñas-Luzbel-844465038915122/

Luzbel is a heavy metal band from Mexico founded in 1982 by Raul Fernandez Greñas (lead guitar), Antonio "la Rana" Morante (bass guitar), Jorge Cabrera (vocals), Hugo Tamez (drums) and Fernando Landeros (guitar). They were signed to Warner Music in 1985. Luzbel is best known during the 1980s and 1990s for songs like Holocausto, 2pm ,'Por piedad, La Gran Ciudad, Pasaporte Al Infierno, Paradoxa, Juegos De Pasion, Utopia, Souvenir, Plegaria De Un Loco, Te Posereé, El Tiempo De Odio, Del Infierno, El Errante, El Loco, Íncubo and the metalhead hymn Advertencia.

== History ==
Their first demo, called El Comienzo, included songs from Raul Greñas' previous band, Red. Guitarist Raúl Fernández founded Red in England and it had a hard rock-influenced Motörhead style and a little peer voice of Ian Gillan. The songs were published in 1995 including songs with Jorge Cabrera on vocals, LP, tape, and then CD officially in projecting releases such as Father's son, La Magia Está En El Aire and Holocausto.

In 1985, as part of the birth of Comstock subsidiary of WEA label Warner Music now, Luzbel was chosen among other groups to record their first official material, the acclaimed EP Metal Caído Del Cielo. The guitar work was simply outstanding and showed characteristics of a musician of the highest caliber. Raúl immediately established a fan base. Singer Arturo Huizar also developed a metal fan base in Mexico for a generation.

Pasaporte al inferno was recorded early in 1986. The lineup included Alejandro Vasquez on drums. The classics Pasaporte al Infierno, Por Piedad, and Hijos Del Metal were inscribed in the annals of rock and roll history and to this day continue to be some of Luzbel's best work.

In 1987, the unexpected happened and Huizar left the band due to health issues that included a minor throat problem. He was replaced by Juan Bolaños, and a third album called Luzbel was the result. This was the last album for the band under the Warner Music label. Luzbel took on fiercer themes in the lyrics in the album. Bolaños' wider vocal range, attitude, a while contributed a new lyrical style and the band expanded its fan base.

In 1990, with Hugo Tamez on drums and Francisco Yescas on the second guitar, Luzbel recorded the album "Again" under an indie label. Luzbel focused on attracting a wider market and along with the new songs, they recorded a cover of the Beatles' track "For No one". Bolaños brought powerful lyrics to the mix and it included one of Luzbel's greatest ballads, "souvenir"; however reception was cool among its hardcore followers and the distribution of this record was somewhat limited.

In 1994, Huizar joined Luzbel again and adds Coda bass player Zito Martinez. This formation yielded the album "La Rebelión De Los Desgraciados" which was produced with Sony music. This album contained the singles: "Generacion Pasiva", "Contrato Suicida" and "Resucitando El Sentido". They were eventually republished under the label "Denver" with a new cover. The combination Huizar/Greñas met very high expectations from Luzbel followers, however, the record was very different from the early Luzbel style and found itself facing, like many other hard rock and metal bands did, an era dominated by grunge and alternative rock.

Luzbel's last public appearance was in a late-night television talk show hosted by Victor Trujillo (also known as Brozo). Raúl Fernández Greñas announced Luzbel was on a hiatus to explore new musical adventures. Luzbel's last period work appeared on the market, under the form of a compilation called "The Best of Luzbel" (1998) with new remasters of the three albums that were made during its time under Warner Music.

In 2000, several Mexican heavy metal bands decided to record an album in tribute to Luzbel. Bands included; Agora, The Garrobos, Calvaria, and Anabantha.

In 2004, the band was reformed under the name "Luzbel", with Juan Bolaños on vocals, guitar Raul Greñas, Paco Rock on the second guitar, Armando "Magnus " Boland on drums and Daniel Kano on bass. This was for a small period of activity of the original band Luzbel.

And in 2006, they released a double live album called: 'Otra vez en Vivo Desde El Infierno!!!', by fans from the famous Mexico City "Tianguis Cultural Chopo" made of mostly bootlegs.

Raul Greñas announced on their official Facebook page that "Luzbel Official Mexico" was the kickoff of a new tour for 2013 with a new lineup and album. There is a free download for Kirieleison under the new lineup, which includes:

- Raul Fernandez Greñas: Guitars
- Mike de la Rosa: (former) Singer
- Vic Mata y Nava: Bass
- Jorge Curiel: Drums

The first presentation of this revival was on February 28, 2013, at the Teatro Aldama in Mexico City and began a tour of different cities in Mexico. They had a well-received TV presentation in the show Animal Nocturno on Friday, August 9, 2013. The word on the street was: 'Luzbel is back in force'.

On December 1, 2017, Luzbel announced on their Facebook page that Mike de La Rosa departed from the band in amicable terms. The singer slot is now filled by hard rock veteran vocalist, Mike Gonzalez (Adam, Erógena, Cisma), with whom they recorded a new album at La Rocka Producciones Studios in Mexico City in 2018. The production was done in the format of an EP, to be released in 2019. Details were published on the official Luzbel Facebook page.

The band released their EP on September 10 in both digital and physical formats, under the name of “El Retorno a la Obscuridad”. The pre-album contains 4 themes, all made, captured and pre-mixed in México City at La Rocka Producciones studios. Prior to the mastering, the band and their management decided to contact Dan Swanö in order to mix and master the tracks. The tracks from Unisound were delivered sooner than expected with positive feedback from the famous mix engineer. The band had stated that there will be an extension to an LP (long play), which is currently under development.

As of September of 2022, the production for the new album is in progress. All the instrumental and vocal tracks have been laid down for the rough mix. The final tracks were sent to Dan Swanö (Unisound) for mixing/mastering during autumn/winter.

The latest album was launched in June 1st of 2024 on digital platforms, under the name of “Los Hijos de Adán”, featuring 11 new songs. The production team is the same as in the successful EP “El Retorno a la Obscuridad”. The lineup changed regarding the drums section, making Randy Corona the most recent and youngest member.

== Members ==
Current lineup:

- Raúl Greñas – Guitars
- Mike Gonzalez – Singer
- Humberto Vazquez – Bass
- Jorge Curiel – Drums

Previous lineup:

- Juan Bolaños – Vocals
- Raúl Greñas – Guitars
- Paco "Rock" – Guitars
- Daniel Kano – Bass
- Armando "Magnvz" Bolaños – Drums

== Past members ==
- Juan Bolaños – Vocals
- Guillermo Herrejon – Vocals 1983
- Jorge Cabrera – Vocals 1984
- Arturo Huizar – Vocals (Lvzbel, Raxas (Mex), Transmetal, Huizar, Ultratumba (Mex))

Arturo Huizar (born September 5, 1957) died on April 25, 2020, due to diabetes-related complications at the age of 62.

- Mike De la Rosa – Vocals
- Hugo Tamez – Drums
- Vic Nava y Mata – Bass
- Jorge Curiel - Drums
- Fernando Laderos – Guitars
- Paco Yescas – Guitars
- Zito Martínez – Bass
- Antonio "La Rana" Morante – Bass
- Daniel Kano – Bass
- Alejandro Vázquez – Drums
- Sergio Lopez – Drums
- Fernando Landeros – Guitar
- Hugo Tamés – Drums
- Armando "Magnus" Bolaños – Drums
- Humberto H Medina – guitar
- Paco Rock – guitar
- Andremar Mallet – Bass

== Discography ==
- 1.- Whisper Of Death (Demo 1983)
- 2.- Luzbel (Single 1985 Comrock)
- 3.- Metal Caído del Cielo (EP 1985 Comrock – WEA)
- 4.- Pasaporte al Infierno (1986 Comrock – WEA)
- 5.- Luzbel (1987 WEA)
- 6.- ¡¿Otra vez?! (1989 Discos Sanchez)
- 7.- La Rebelión de los Desgraciados (1994 Sony Music)
- 8.- El Comienzo (1997 Discos Denver)
- 9.- Regreso Al Origen (2013 Ceiba Records)
- 10.- El Tiempo De Odio (2016 Sade Records)
- 11.- La Gran Ciudad / El Errante (2018 Luzbel Records)
- 12.- El Retorno a la Obscuridad (2019 La Rocka / Sade)
- 13.- Los Hijos de Adán (2024 La Rocka / American Line Prods)

== Compilations ==
- Antologia Perdida I (Compilation 1998 Discos Phoenix)
- Antologia Perdida II (Compilation 1998 Discos Phoenix)
- Lo Mejor de Luzbel (Compilation 1998 Warner Music)
- Vivo En el Vive (2017 Jorge Curiel Productions)

== See also ==
- Transmetal

== Sources ==
- Luzbel Mexican Page
- BNR Metal Pages – Luzbel
- Metal archives – Luzbel
