= Transmetal (band) =

Mexican extreme metal band

- Origin: Yurécuaro, Michoacán, Mexico
- Genres: Thrash metal, death metal
- Years active: 1987–present
- Members: Lorenzo Partida; Javier Partida; Juan Partida; Sergio Burgos; Adrián Tena
- Website: transmetalmexico.com

Transmetal is an extreme metal band formed in Ciudad Azteca, Ecatepec, Mexico, in 1987 by brothers Javier, Juan, and Lorenzo Partida. They are known as one of the most important metal bands in Latin America. Their most well known song is "Killers", from the Desear un Funeral EP (1989), which is a cover of French band Killers. They are also known for their 1993 album El infierno de Dante, recorded at Morrisound Studios with producer Scott Burns and Glen Benton on choruses. The album sold almost 100.000 copies and got them regularly featured on MTV.

Transmetal have released over 30 albums that experiment with thrash and death metal, with growling vocals. The band has played shows with Slayer, Sepultura, Overkill, and Kreator.

== Band members ==
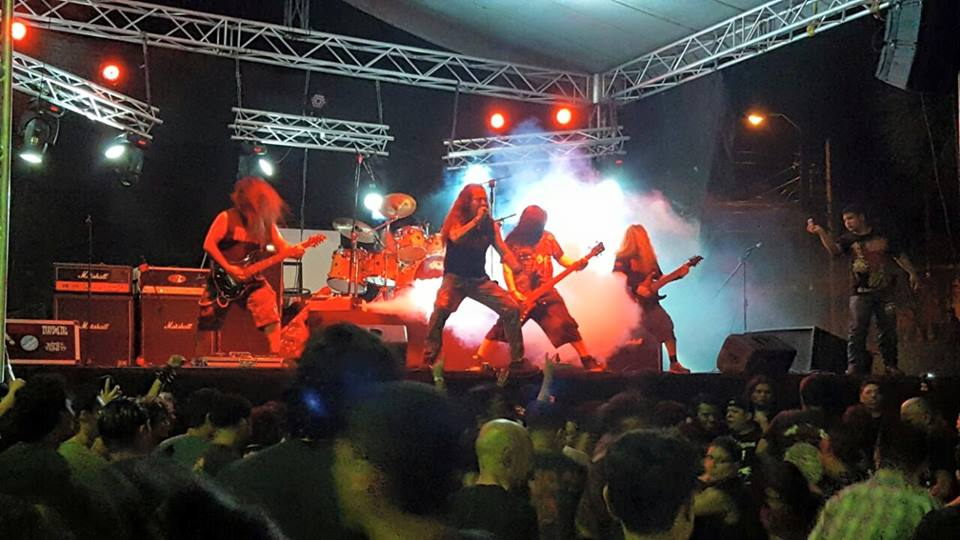
Transmetal performing live

=== Current ===
- Juan Partida – lead guitar (1987–present)
- Lorenzo Partida – bass (1987–present)
- Javier Partida – drums (1987–present)
- Isabel Romero – lead vocals (2025–present)
- Adrián Tena – rhythm guitar (2018–present)

=== Former ===
- Alberto Pimentel – lead vocals, rhythm guitar (1987–1990, 1992–1998, 2007–2009)
- Alejandro González – lead vocals (1990–1992)
- Mauricio Torres – lead vocals (1998–2004)
- Bruno Blázquez – lead vocals (2005–2007)
- Chris Menpart – lead vocals, rhythm guitar (2009–2014)
- Juan Carlos Camarena – rhythm guitar (1990–1992, 2004–2005)
- Ernesto Torres – rhythm guitar (1998–2003)
- Antonio Tenorio – rhythm guitar (2005–2007)
- Arturo Cabrera – rhythm guitar (2014–2018)
- Sergio Burgos - lead vocals (2014-2025)

=== Live Members ===
- Glen Benton – lead vocals (1993)
- Arturo Huizar – lead vocals (1998; died 2020)

== Discography ==
- Velocidad, Desecho Y Metal (1987) (demo)
- Muerto en la Cruz (1988) (LP)
- Desear un Funeral (1989) (EP)
- Sepelio en el Mar (1990) (LP)
- Zona Muerta (1991) (LP)
- Amanecer en el Mausoleo (1992) (Compilation)
- Burial at Sea (1992) (LP)
- En Vivo Vols. 1 & 2 (1992) (Live)
- Crónicas de Dolor (1993) (mix)
- El Infierno de Dante (1993) (LP) (also available as Dante's Inferno)
- El Llamado de la Hembra (1996) (LP)
- México Bárbaro (1996) (LP)
- Las Alas del Emperador (1999)
- Debajo de los Cielos Púrpura (1999)
- XIII Años en Vivo Primera Parte / XIII Años en Vivo Segunda Parte (2000) (Live)
- Tristeza de Lucifer (2002)
- El Amor Supremo (2002)
- Lo Podrido Corona la Inmensidad (2004)
- 17 Years Down in Hell (2004) (Compilation)
- Temple de Acero (2004)
- El Despertar de la Adversidad (2006)
- Progresión Neurótica (2006)
- 20 Años Ondeando la Bandera del Metal (2007)
- Odyssey in the Flesh (2008)
- En Vivo Desde Tijuana. Mex. (2011) (Live)
- Decadencia en la Modernidad (2011)
- Indestructible (2012)
- Peregrinación a la Cabeza de Cristo (2014)
- Desde lo Más Profundo del Infierno - En Vivo Desde Monterrey (2017) (Live)
- El Trigésimo Mandamiento (2017)
- Maldito Rock and Roll (2019)
- Supervivencia en el México Bárbaro - En Vivo (2019) (Live)
- 33 (2020) (EP)
- Demiurgo (2020)
- Thrash Increíble en Cuernavaca (2020) (Live)
- En Vivo Desde el Santuario del Metal (2022) (Live)
- Adiós Satanás (2022)
- Lápidas Sin Epitafios (2023)
