= Cello Dias =

Brazilian bassist

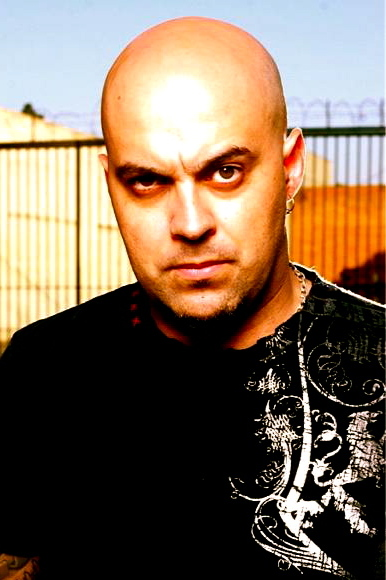
- Dias in 2009

Background information
- Also known as: Marcello D. Rapp, Cello Dias
- Born: Marcelo Dias
- Origin: São Caetano do Sul, Brazil
- Genres: Alternative rock, hard rock, heavy metal, nu metal
- Occupation: Musician
- Instrument: Bass guitar
- Years active: 1988–present
- Website: againstallwill.com

Marcelo "Cello" Dias is a Brazilian musician. He is the bass guitarist of Against All Will and the former bass guitarist of Soulfly.

== Biography ==
=== The Mist ===
Dias began his career in 1988 playing bass guitar for the Brazilian thrash metal band The Mist, which had just changed its name from Mayhem following a number of line-up changes. On the band's first album, Phantasmagoria, released in 1989, they most notably used their Chakal singer Vladimir Korg on vocals and boasted a twin guitar line-up displaying a progressive mix of aggressive thrash and gothic atmosphere. For the second album, The Hangman Tree in 1991, the former Sepultura guitarist Jairo Guedz took over full guitar duties for the band, reducing it to a four-piece while further expanding the unique sound of the first album. Korg left after the second album, further reducing the line-up to a trio for which Marcelo took over vocals for the third album, Ashes to Ashes, Dust to Dust, released in 1993, which showed the band adopting a more contemporary groove metal sound. Following this release, Dias left the band and was replaced by Cassiano Gobbet on both bass guitar and vocals for the final album, Gottverlassenin 1995, before splitting up in 1997.

=== Soulfly ===
Dias (a.k.a. Marcello D. Rapp) found international fame as the bass guitar player for the metal band Soulfly. His collaborations in the band's first three albums (Soulfly, Primitive and 3) were essential and indeed established his professional level earning him certified RIAA gold records in the US as well in other countries, selling more than two million copies worldwide.

Soulfly incorporated many styles of metal with Brazilian tribal and world music. Dias's first three studio albums entered on the US Billboard 200, with a peak position at number 32 for the second album, Primitive. The band's first album, Soulfly, was certified gold by the RIAA.

=== Abloom ===
Dias with his bandmates Mikey Doling, Roy Mayorga and One Side Zero's Jasan Radford and Levon Sultanian, formed Abloom. Performing shows from California to New York, they quickly achieved national status for an unsigned band. With System of a Down bass guitarist's Shavo Odadjian as their executive producer, they recorded a full-length album on their own, with an open agenda to negotiate any future deals. Abloom is no longer active.

=== Against All Will ===
Dias' current band, Against All Will, consists of Puddle of Mudd's main songwriter Jimmy Allen on guitars, Jeff Current (Seven Story Drop) on vocals and Phillip Gonyea (Instinct of Aggression) on drums. The band finished its independent album, A Rhyme & Reason, in December 2009 and performed shows throughout the US in spring 2010.

In 2005, Dias appeared as one of the bass guitar players on the Roadrunner United compilation CD, The All-Star Sessions, with Fear Factory's guitarist Dino Cazares, Roy Mayorga (Stone Sour), Andreas Kisser (Sepultura) and many others.

== Equipment ==
- ESP – MD 500 Signature Bass
- Fernandes Gravity 5 Deluxe
- Ampeg SVT 4 Pro Bass Amplifier and SVT 810E cabinet
- Morley Pedals
- Tech21 Sans Amp PSA1
- DR Strings
- Monster Cables

== Discography ==
Albums

- 1989: The Mist – Phantasmagoria (Cogumelo Records)
- 1991: The Mist – The Hangman Tree (Cogumelo Records)
- 1993: The Mist – Ashes to Ashes, Dust to Dust (Cogumelo Records)
- 1998: Soulfly – Soulfly (Roadrunner Records)
- 2000: Soulfly – Primitive (Roadrunner Records)
- 2002: Soulfly – 3 (Roadrunner Records)
- 2004: Abloom – Abloom (independent)
- 2009: Agony – The Devil's Breath (independent)

Singles

- 1998: "Umbabarauma" (Jorge Ben cover version)
- 1998: "Bleed" (feat. Fred Durst)
- 2000: "Back to the Primitive"

Videos

- 1998: "Bleed"
- 2000: "Back to the Primitive"
- 2002: "Seek 'n' Strike"

Guest participations

- 2005: Roadrunner United – The All-Star Sessions (Roadrunner Records)
