= The Rootsman =

English musician

- Born: John Leo Bolloten; Brighton, England
- Origin: Bradford, England
- Genres: Reggae
- Years active: 1985–2000s
- Label: Third Eye
- Website: The Rootsman on Facebook

John Leo Bolloten, also known as The Rootsman, is a musician and DJ based in Bradford, England. Bolloten is also a social documentary photographer.

== Early life ==
Bolloten was born in Brighton. He moved to Scotland at the age of nine.

== Music career ==
Bolloten's musical career began when he was living in Edinburgh, Scotland and taught himself to play guitar in 1978 at the age of 13 and formed his first punk band. After 3 concerts, he decided that being a guitarist in a band was not for him and he retired from that aspect of the music business. He moved to Bradford at the age of 18 in 1983. He worked for over two years in the local Roots Record Shop, where he began to be known as 'Rootsman'.

Starting off making roots reggae in 1985, he began to incorporate African, Middle Eastern, Asian, trip hop and electronic dance music elements into his experimental dub music. In the mid-1990s, he started his own Third Eye label, and went on to work with artists such as Muslimgauze, Alex Paterson, Soulfly, Junior Delgado, and Dub Syndicate.

Rootsman broadcast dub selections on various local radio stations from the late 80s to the mid Nineties including Bradford pirate stations Paradise City Radio (better known as PCR Radio) and WKLR, a selection of his vintage broadcasts from these stations uploaded to his official YouTube channel, including exclusive special guest interviews with dub reggae legends such as The Disciples from London Rootsman's YouTube channel.

In the late 1990s, Bolloten converted to Islam, and his music took on an increasingly spiritual quality.

His 2002 album New Testament featured guest vocals from Sandeeno, U Brown, Earl 16, Mike Brooks, and Daddy Freddy.

== Photography ==
Bolloten is also a social documentary photographer.

== Discography ==
- City Rockers EP (1994)
- "Koyaanisqatsi" (1994)
- "In Dub We Trust" (1995)
- "International Language of Dub: The Rootsman Remixed" (1995)
- Natural Born Thrillers EP (1995)
- "Authorised Versions" (1996)
- Mother of Nature EP (1996)
- Pass the Chalice EP (1996)
- "Into the Light" (1996)
- City of Djinn" (with Muslimgauze) (1997)
- "Out of the Darkness: The Rootsman Remixed" (1997)
- "Rebirth" (1997)
- "Third Eye Dimensions" (1997)
- "52 Days to Timbuktu" (1998)
- "The Final Frontier - The Rootsman Remixed" (1998)
- "Union of Souls" (1998)
- We Come Rough EP (1998)
- Imitator EP (1999)
- "Realms of the Unseen" (1999)
- "Return to the City of Djinn" (with Muslimgauze) (1999)
- Versions of the Unseen EP (1999)
- Old School New School (with Daddy Freddy) (2000)
- "Roots Bloody Rootsman" (2001)
- "Al Aqsa Intifada" (2002)
- "New Testament" (2002)
- Joy and Sorrow EP (2003)
- Showcase EP (2003)
- "Walk with Jah" (2003)
- "Intifada", "Intifada Dub" b/w (with Celtarabia) "Valley of the Kings", "Valley of Dub" - Partial Records 10" (2014)
- "Fittest of the Fittest", "When the Eye Opens" b/w "Only Jah", "Exodus" (Vibronics Remix) - Partial Records 10" (2015)
