= Uns Dias ao Vivo =

Uns Dias Ao Vivo

Live album by Os Paralamas do Sucesso
- Released: March 24, 2004
- Recorded: November 14, 2003
- Venue: Olympia, SP
- Length: 1:39:00
- Label: EMI
- Producer: Carlo Bartolini

Os Paralamas do Sucesso chronology
Longo Caminho (2002)	Uns Dias Ao Vivo (2004)	Hoje (2005)

Uns Dias Ao Vivo is the fifth live album by Brazilian rock band Os Paralamas do Sucesso, recorded at the Olympia in São Paulo.

== Track listing ==
=== Disc one ===
1. "O Calibre" (from Longo Caminho)
2. "Running On The Spot" (from Longo Caminho)
3. "Trac-Trac (Track-Track)" (from Os Grãos)
4. "Mensagem de Amor" (from O Passo do Lui)
5. "Selvagem" (from Selvagem?)
6. "Soldado da Paz" (from Longo Caminho)
7. "Que País é Este" (from Acústico MTV)
8. "Seguindo Estrelas" (from Longo Caminho)
9. "Meu Erro" (from O Passo do Lui)
10. "Cuide Bem do Seu Amor" (from Longo Caminho)
11. "Longo Caminho" (from Longo Caminho)
12. "Tendo a Lua" (from Os Grãos)
13. "Será Que Vai Chover? / Assaltaram a Gramática / O Filho Pródigo" (from D / from O Passo do Lui / unreleased)

=== Disc two ===
1. "Dos Margaritas" (from Severino)
2. "Depois da Queda o Coice (from Hey Na Na)
3. "Ska" (from O Passo do Lui)
4. "La Bella Luna" (from Nove Luas)
5. "Uns Dias" (from Bora-Bora)
6. "Caleidoscópio" (from Arquivo)
7. "Ela Disse Adeus" (from Hey Na Na)
8. "Lanterna dos Afogados" (from Big Bang)
9. "Uma Brasileira" (from Vamo Batê Lata)
10. "O Beco" (from Bora-Bora)
11. "Alagados" (from Selvagem?)
12. "Lourinha Bombril (Parate y Mira)" (from Nove Luas)
13. "Mensagem de Amor" (from O Passo do Lui)

== Personnel ==
- Herbert Vianna - lead guitar, lead vocals
- Bi Ribeiro - bass guitar
- João Barone - drums, backing vocals
- João Fera - keyboards, backing vocals
- Eduardo Lyra - percussion
- José Monteiro Junior - tenor saxophone
- Bidu Cordeiro - trombone
- Edgard Scandurra - lead guitar and backing vocals in "Running On The Spot" and "Trac-Trac"
- Dado Villa-Lobos - lead guitar in "Soldado da Paz" and "Que País é Este", backing vocals in "Que País é Este"
- Nando Reis - co-lead vocals in "Tendo a Lua"
- Black Alien - rap in "Será Que Vai Chover? / Assaltaram a Gramática / O Filho Prodígio"
- George Israel - alto saxophone in "Ska", "La Bella Luna", "Caleidoscópio" and "Ela Disse Adeus"
- Roberto Frejat - lead guitar and co-lead vocals in "Uns Dias" and "Caleidoscópio"
- Djavan - co-lead vocals in "Lanterna dos Afogados" and "Uma Brasileira"
- Paulo Miklos - co-lead vocals in "O Beco"
- Andreas Kisser - lead guitar in "Mensagem de Amor" (disc two)
