= Paralamas e Titãs Juntos e Ao Vivo =

Live album by Paralamas do Sucesso and Titãs
- Released: June 2008
- Recorded: 26 January 2008, at Marina da Glória, Rio de Janeiro
- Genre: Rock
- Label: EMI

Paralamas do Sucesso and Titãs chronology
Titãs & Paralamas Juntos Ao Vivo (2000)	Paralamas e Titãs Juntos e Ao Vivo (2008)

Os Paralamas do Sucesso chronology
Rock in Rio 1985 (2007)	Paralamas e Titãs Juntos e ao Vivo (2008)	Brasil Afora (2009)

Titãs chronology
MTV ao Vivo (2005)	Paralamas e Titãs Juntos e ao Vivo (2008)	Sacos Plásticos (2009)

Paralamas e Titãs Juntos e Ao Vivo is a live album by Brazilian rock bands Paralamas do Sucesso and Titãs in June 2008. It is the second live album recorded by both bands together, and it has been released as a DVD as well. The album is part of the bands' 25 years of career celebration, and several other shows took place in the beginning of 2008, with both bands sharing stage. Some well-known Brazilian artists made guest appearances during the show, like Andreas Kisser (from Sepultura), Samuel Rosa (from Skank), and Arnaldo Antunes (former Titãs member). For the live performances, both bands were nominated for "Best Live Act" at the 2008 MTV Video Music Brazil awards

== Background ==
The first time both bands had shared the stage with all members simultaneously had been in the 1992 edition of Hollywood Rock. The ideia of playing together again came when both bands met in the backstage of the 2005 festival Planeta Atlântida in Rio Grande do Sul. The collective tour began in October 2007 with a show in Belo Horizonte and was supposed to be only five shows long, but there was demand for some additional dates. The setlist was determined by the groups, with each band choosing songs from the other one's catalogue.

Commenting about the careers of both groups, then vocalist and guitarist of Titãs Paulo Miklos said that "more than the proximity, the collegiality, there was also between us a healthy competition. These works show the real proximity of what we have. There was something exciting about realizing the paths that the other one was walking".

The song "Meu Erro" and the medley "Sonífera Ilha / Ska" were included in the soundtrack of Rede Globo's telenovela Três Irmãs. "Selvagem / Polícia" is featured in Paralamas's compilation album Arquivo 3.

== Track listing ==
No.	Title	Music	Lead vocals	Length
1.	"Diversão" (Fun)	Sérgio Britto, Nando Reis	Herbert Vianna	3:21
2.	"O Calibre" (The Caliber)	Vianna	Vianna and Paulo Miklos	3:05
3.	"Marvin (Patches)"	Ronald Dunbar and General N. Johnson (version by Britto and Reis)	Mello and Vianna	4:14
4.	"Selvagem/Polícia" (Savage/Police; featuring Andreas Kisser)	Vianna, Bi Ribeiro, João Barone/ Tony Bellotto	Britto & Vianna	4:49
5.	"Uma Brasileira" (A (female) Brazilian)	Carlinhos Brown and Vianna	Vianna	3:36
6.	"A Novidade" (The News)	Vianna, Ribeiro, Barone and Gilberto Gil	Vianna and Britto	3:46
7.	"Homem Primata" (Primate Man)	Britto, Marcelo Fromer, Reis and Ciro Pessoa	Britto and Vianna	3:21
8.	"Lourinha Bombril (Parate Y Mira)" (Bombril Little Blond (Stop and Notice it); featuring Samuel Rosa)	Diego José Blanco and Fernando Javier Luis Hortal (version by Vianna)	Rosa, Mello and Vianna	3:05
9.	"Cabeça Dinossauro" (Head Dinossaur)	Miklos, Mello and Antunes	Mello	4:19
10.	"A Melhor Banda de Todos os Tempos da Última Semana" (Last Week's Best Band Ever)	Britto and Mello	Mello	3:11
11.	"O Beco" (The Alley; featuring Samuel Rosa)	Vianna and Ribeiro	Rosa, Mello & Vianna	3:22
12.	"Trac-Trac (Track-Track)" (I'll Doubt It)	Fito Páez (version by Vianna)	Vianna and Britto	3:27
13.	"Go Back"	Torquato Neto and Britto	Britto and Vianna	3:43
14.	"Comida" (Food; featuring Arnaldo Antunes)	Fromer, Britto and Antunes	Antunes and Miklos	4:43
15.	"Lugar Nenhum" (Nowhere; featuring Arnaldo Antunes and Andreas Kisser)	Antunes, Charles Gavin, Fromer, Britto and Belloto	Antunes and Mello	4:30
16.	"Óculos" (Glasses)	Vianna	Miklos and Vianna	4:10
17.	"Sonífera Ilha/Ska" (Sleepy Island/Ska)	Mello, Fromer, Belloto, Carlos Barmak, Pessoa/Vianna	Vianna and Miklos	5:08
18.	"Meu Erro" (My Mistake)	Vianna	Vianna and Mello	3:14
19.	"Flores" (Flowers)	Gavin, Belloto, Miklos and Britto	Mello and Vianna	3:56

== Personnel ==
=== Os Paralamas do Sucesso ===
- Herbert Vianna - lead vocals on tracks 1 and 5, co-lead vocals on all tracks except 1, 5, 9, 10, 14 and 15, backing vocals on tracks 10, 14 and 15, lead guitar on tracks 2, 4–6, 8, 11, 12 and 16–18, rhythm guitar on tracks 1, 3, 4, 7, 13-15 and 17, third guitar on tracks 10 and 19
- Bi Ribeiro - bass except on tracks 6 and 9
- João Barone - drums except on track 6, percussion on track 6, backing vocals on tracks 5, 12 and 16

==== Touring members ====
- João Fera - keyboards and backing vocals on tracks 5 and 11
- Monteiro Jr. - saxophone on tracks 5 and 11
- Bidu Cordeiro - trombone on tracks 5 and 11

=== Titãs ===
- Branco Mello - lead vocals on tracks 9 and 10, co-lead vocals on tracks 3, 8, 11, 15, 18 and 19, backing vocals on tracks 1, 2, 4–7, 12–14, 16 and 17, bass on track 9
- Paulo Miklos - co-lead vocals on tracks 2, 14, 16 and 17, backing vocals on tracks 1, 2–13, 15, 18 and 19, rhythm guitar on tracks 9, 10 and 19, harmonica on track 2, saxophone on tracks 3, 11 and 17, keyboards on track 13, mandolin on tracks 6–8
- Sérgio Britto - keyboards on tracks 1–3, 5, 8, 9, 11, 14 and 16–19, co-lead vocals on tracks 4, 6, 7, 12 and 13, backing vocals on tracks 1–3, 5, 8-11 and 14–19
- Tony Bellotto - lead guitar on tracks 1, 3, 4, 7, 9, 10, 13–15, 17 and 19, rhythm guitar on tracks 2, 4–6, 8, 11, 12 and 16–18
- Charles Gavin - drums except on tracks 6 and 13, percussion on tracks 6 and 13

=== Guest performers ===
- Andreas Kisser (from Sepultura) - third guitar and backing vocals on tracks 4 and 15
- Samuel Rosa (from Skank) - co-lead vocals and third guitar on tracks 8 and 11
- Arnaldo Antunes (ex Titãs) - co-lead vocals on tracks 14 and 15
