= Latin Grammy Award for Best Portuguese Language Rock or Alternative Album =

Latin Grammy Award category

- Awarded for: Portuguese language rock or alternative albums containing at least 51% playing time of newly recorded material.
- Country: United States
- Presented by: The Latin Recording Academy
- First award: 2000
- Currently held by: BaianaSystem for O Mundo Dá Voltas (2025)
- Website: latingrammy.com

The Latin Grammy Award for Best Portuguese Language Rock or Alternative Album is an honor presented annually at the Latin Grammy Awards, a ceremony that recognizes excellence and creates a wider awareness of cultural diversity and contributions of Latin recording artists in the United States and internationally.

According to the category description guide for the 13th Latin Grammy Awards, the award is for vocal or instrumental Portuguese Language Rock albums containing at least 51% playing time of newly recorded material. For Solo artists, duos or groups.

From 2000 to 2015, the award category was presented as Best Brazilian Rock Album and was changed to its current name in 2016.

Brazilian band Os Paralamas do Sucesso and singer Erasmo Carlos hold the record of most wins in the category with three each.

== Recipients ==
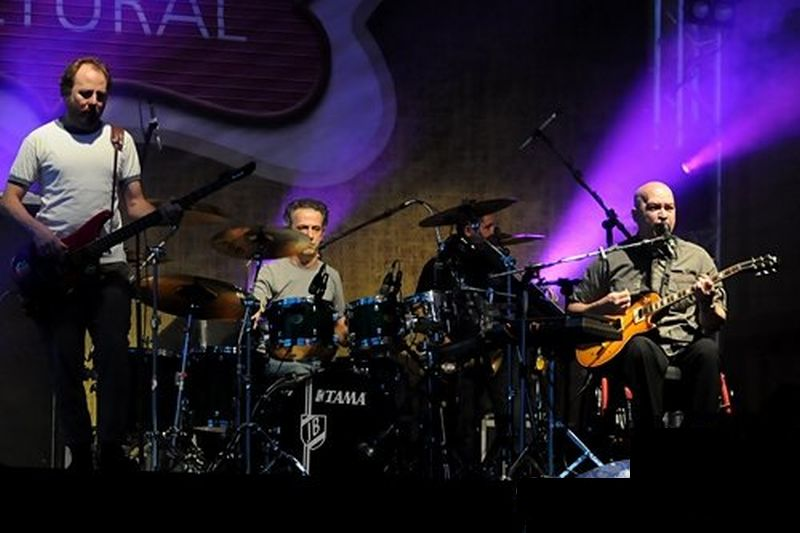
Os Paralamas do Sucesso were the first winners of this award in 2000 for Acústico MTV. Since then, they have won the award two more times, in 2003 and 2006.

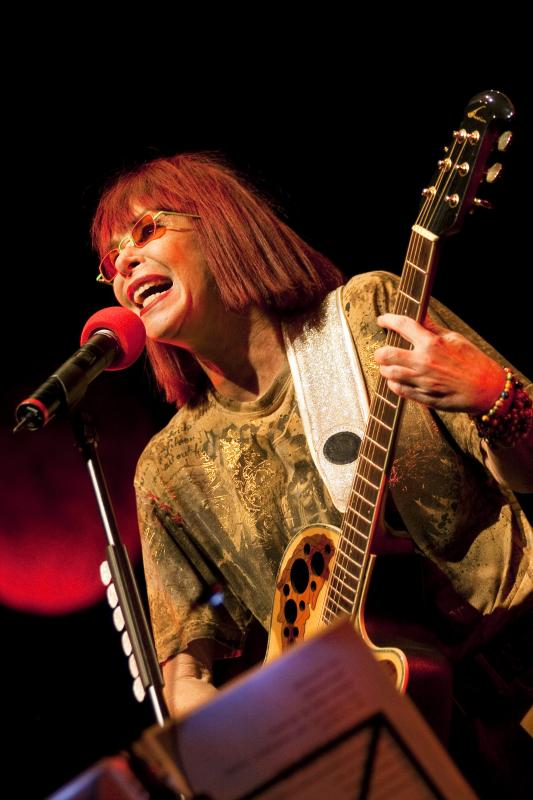
Rita Lee received this award in 2001 for 3001.

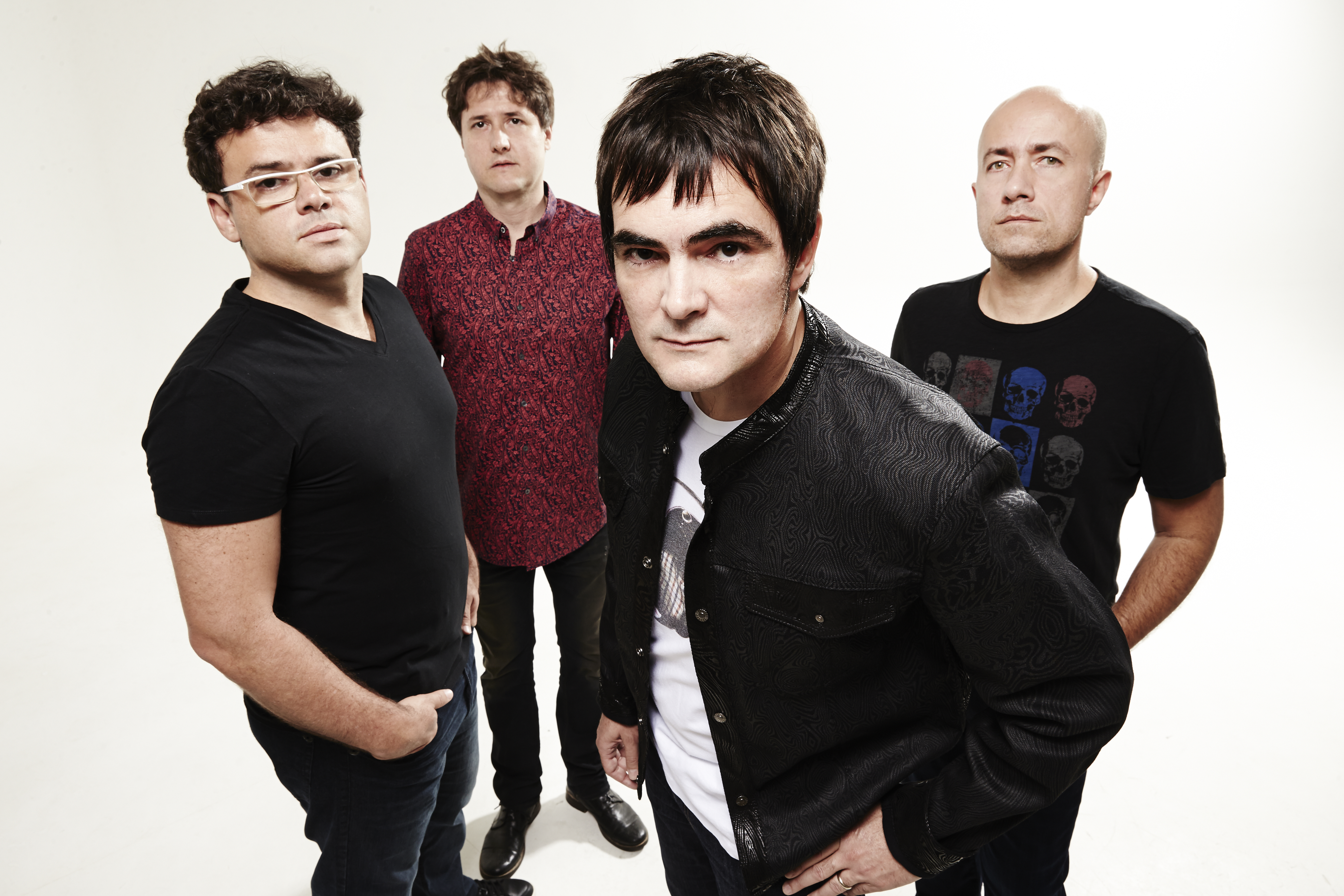
2004 winner, Skank.

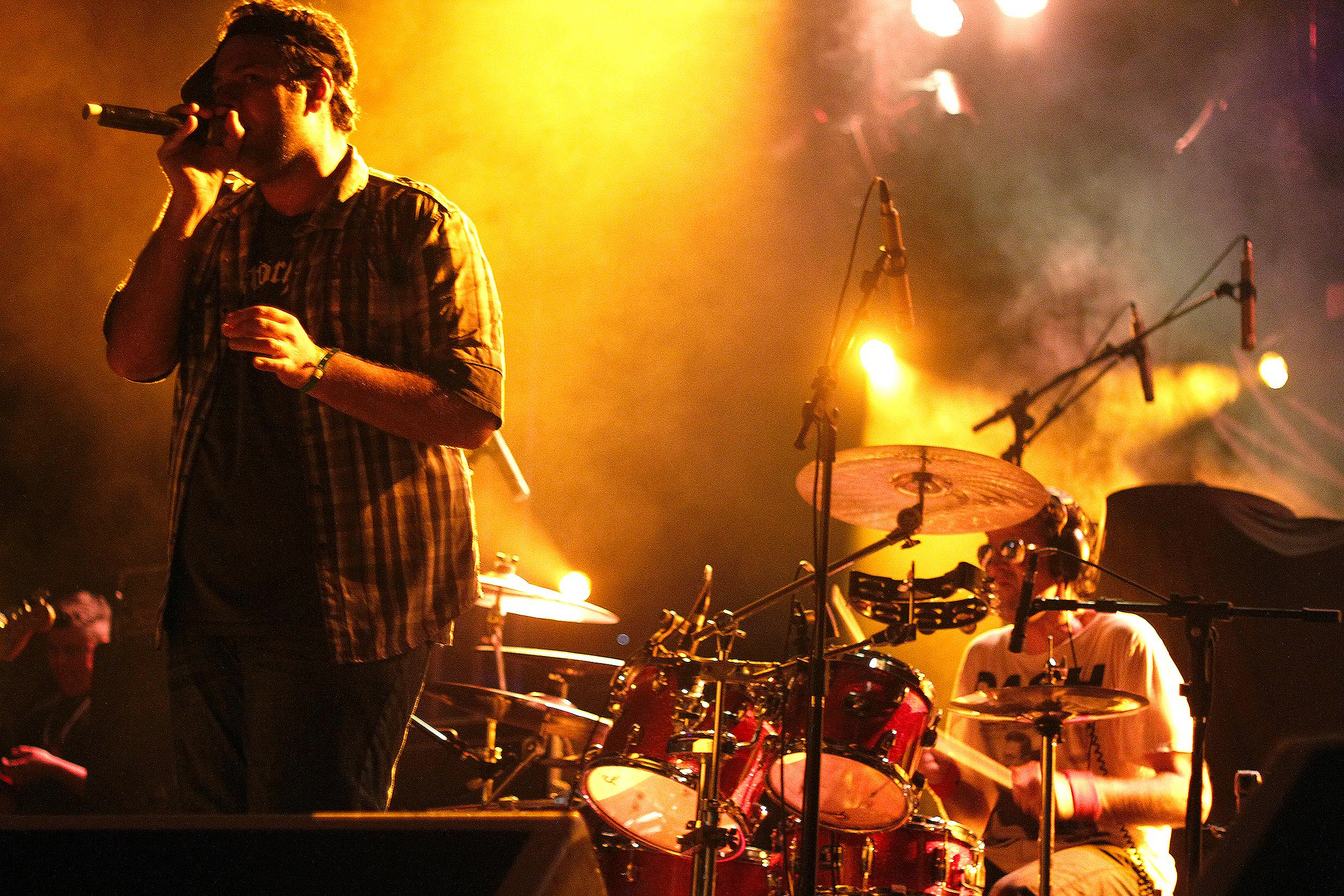
Charlie Brown Jr. has won twice, in 2005 and 2010.

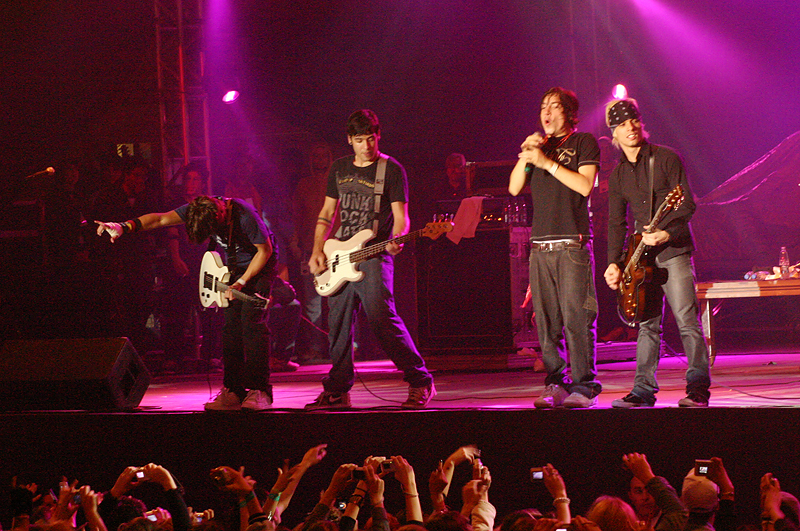
2009 winner, NX Zero.

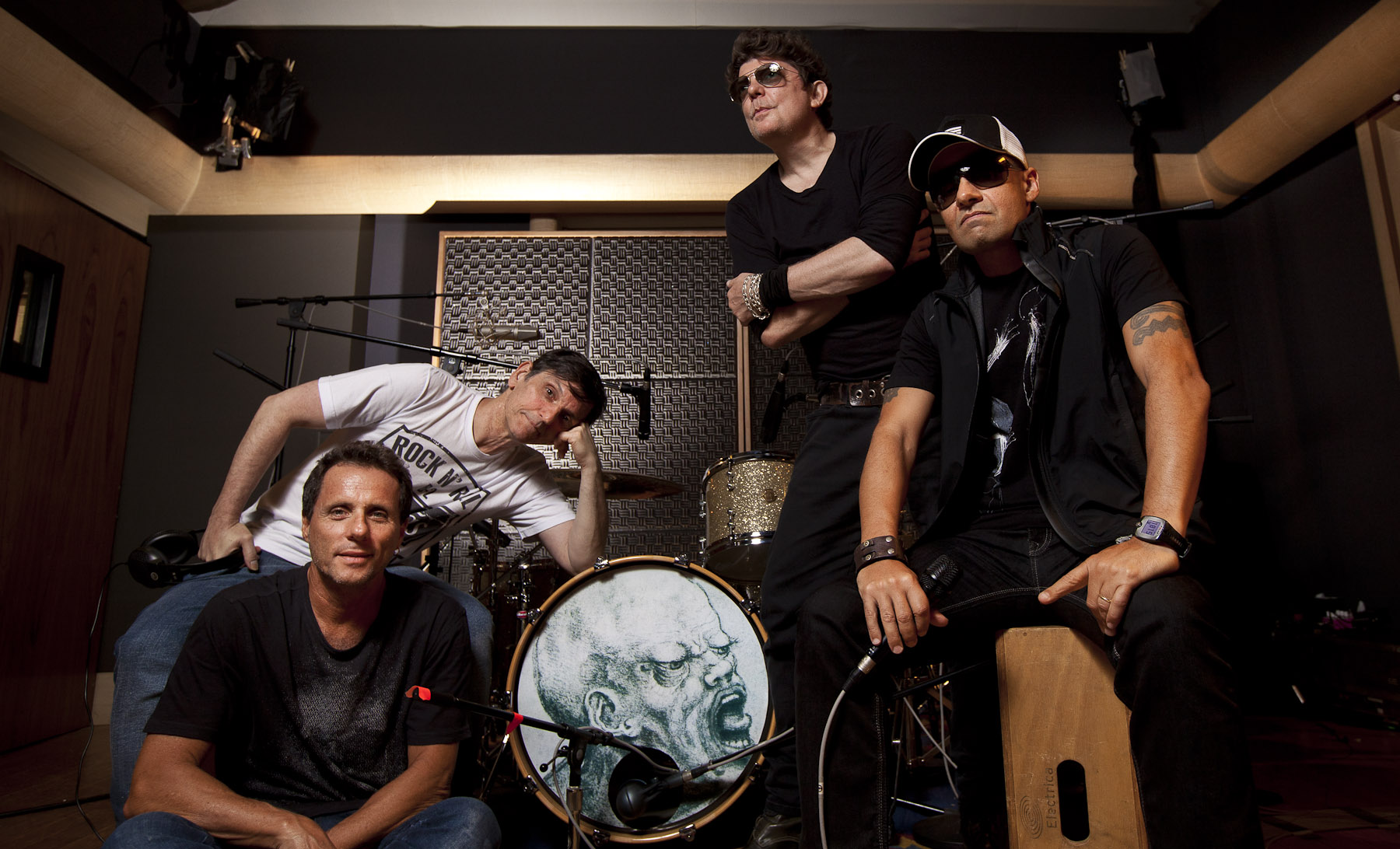
2009 winner Titãs.

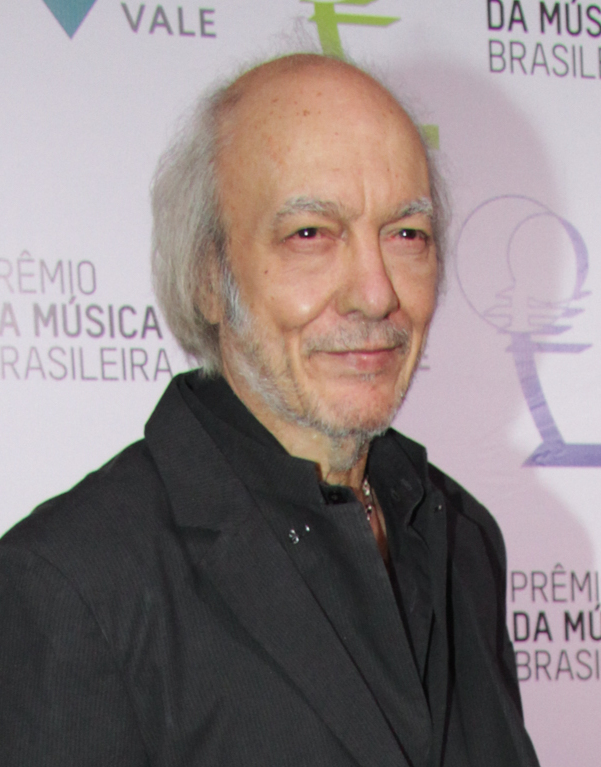
Three-time winner, Erasmo Carlos.

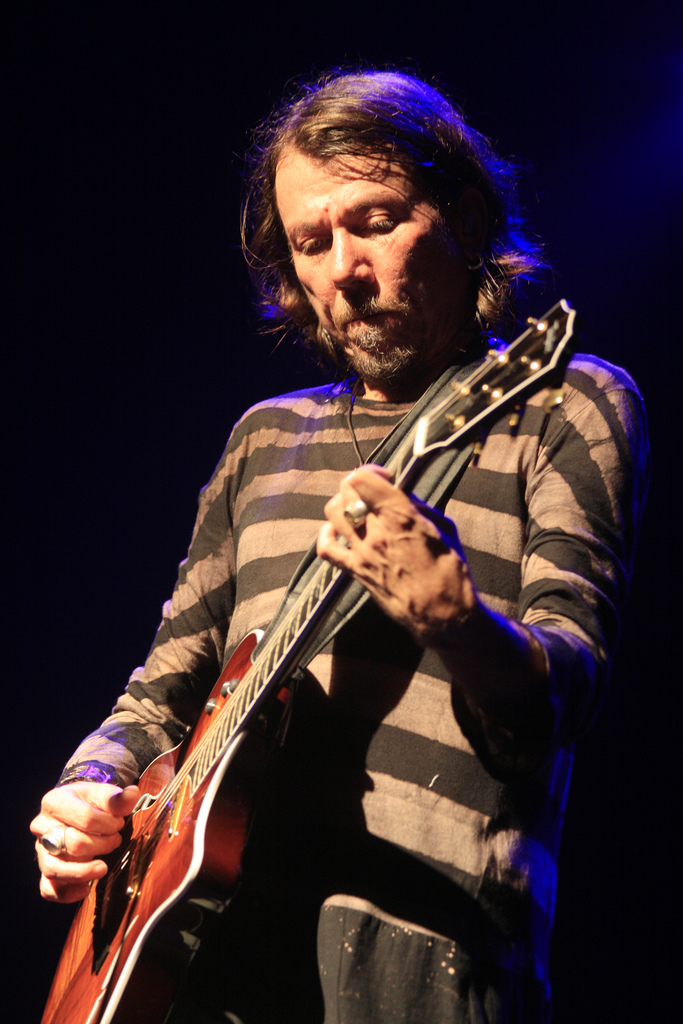
2018 winner, Lenine.

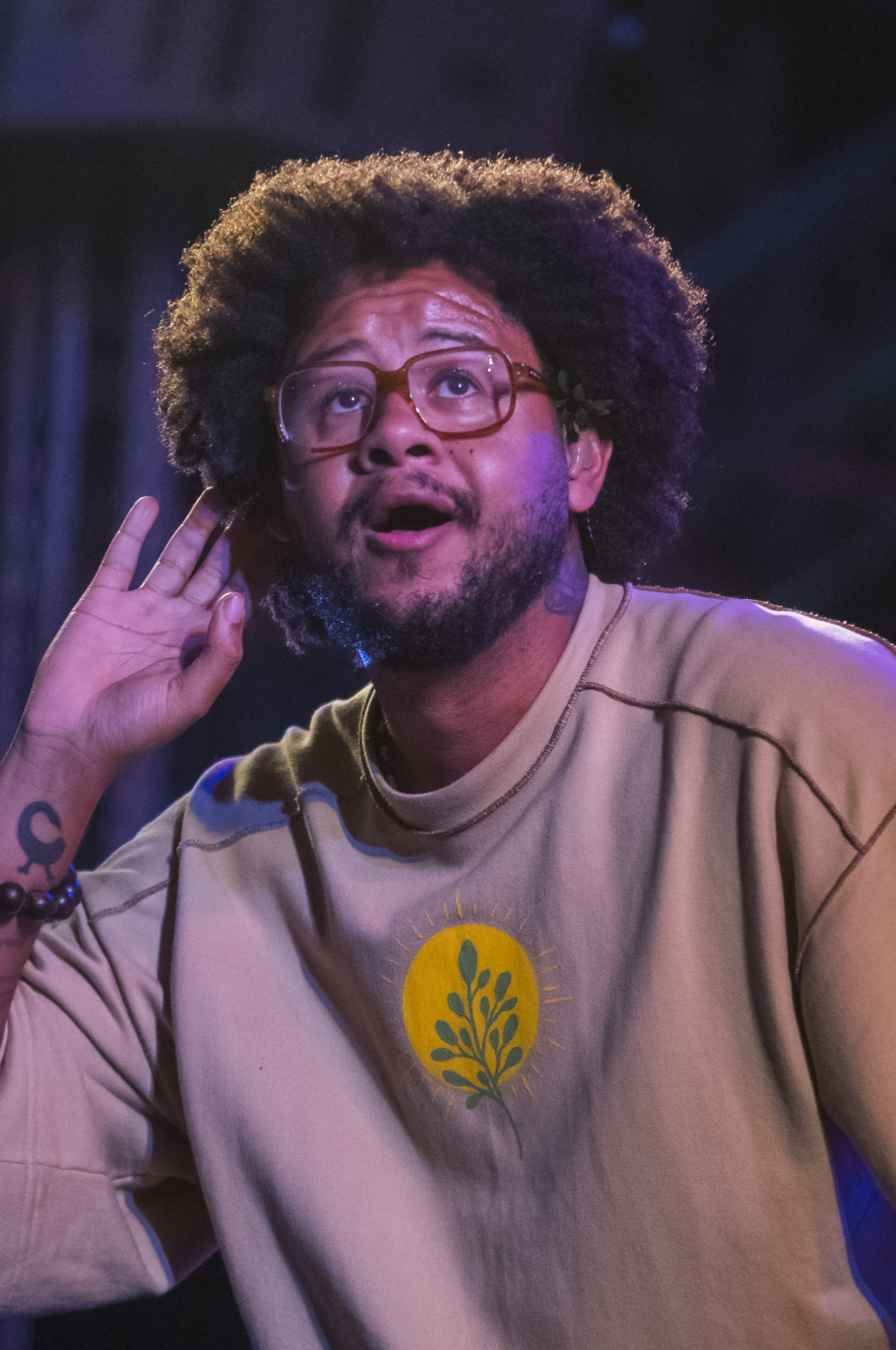
2020 winner, Emicida.

=== Best Brazilian Rock Album ===
Year	Performing artist(s)	Work	Nominees	Ref.
2000	Os Paralamas do Sucesso	Acústico MTV	Cássia Eller – Com vocé... meu mundo ficaria completo; Legião Urbana – Acústico MTV; Los Hermanos – Los Hermanos; Raimundos – Só no forevis	
2001	Rita Lee	3001	Charlie Brown Jr. – Nadando com os Tubarões; Cidade Negra – Enquanto o Mundo Gira; Pavilhão 9 – Reação; Sidereal – Na Paz	
2002	Cássia Eller	Acústico MTV	Arnaldo Antunes – Paradeiro; CPM 22 – CPM 22; Roberto Frejat – Amor Pra Recomecar; Los Hermanos – Bloco do Eu Sozinho	
2003	Os Paralamas do Sucesso	Longo Caminho	Capital Inicial – Rosas e Vinho Tinto; Charlie Brown Jr. – Bocas Ordinárias; CPM 22 – Chegou A Hora De Recomeçar; Cássia Eller – Dez de Dezembro; Nação Zumbi – Nação Zumbi	
2004	Skank	Cosmotron	Roberto Frejat – Sobre Nós 2 e O Resto Do Mundo; Los Hermanos – Ventura; Os Paralamas do Sucesso – Uns Dias Ao Vivo; Pitty – Admirável Chip Novo	
2005	Charlie Brown Jr.	Tamo Aí na Atividade	Barão Vermelho – Barão Vermelho; Leela – Leela; Tianastácia – Tianastácia Ao Vivo	
2006	Os Paralamas do Sucesso	Hoje	Barão Vermelho – MTV Ao Vivo; Charlie Brown Jr. – Imunidade Musical; O Rappa – Acústico MTV; Nando Reis – Sim e Não	
2007	Lobão	Acústico MTV	Capital Inicial – Eu Nunca Disse Adeus; CPM 22 – MTV Ao Vivo CPM 22; Mutantes – Ao Vivo – Barbican Theatre, Londres 2006; NX Zero – NX Zero	
2008	CPM 22	Cidade Cinza	Charlie Brown Jr. – Ritmo, Ritual e Responsa; Detonautas Roque Clube – O Retorno de Saturno; Nação Zumbi – Fome de Tudo; Pitty – {Des}concerto Ao Vivo - 06-07-07 Traje: (Rock Fino)	
2009	NX Zero	Agora	Cachorro Grande – Cinema; Erasmo Carlos – Rock 'N' Roll; Zé Ramalho – Zé Ramalho canta Bob Dylan - Tá tudo mudando	
2009	Titãs	Sacos Plásticos	Cachorro Grande – Cinema; Erasmo Carlos – Rock 'N' Roll; Zé Ramalho – Zé Ramalho canta Bob Dylan - Tá tudo mudando	
2010	Charlie Brown Jr.	Camisa 10 Joga Bola Até na Chuva	Capital Inicial – Das Kapital; Andreas Kisser – Hubris I & II; Nasi – Vivo na Cena; NX Zero – Sete Chaves	
2011	Caetano Veloso	Zii e Zie – Ao Vivo	Fresno – Revanche; Os Mutantes – Haih Or Amortecedor; Pitty – A Trupe Delirante no Circo Voador; Plebe Rude – Rachando Concreto Ao Vivo Em Brasília	
2012	Beto Lee	Celebração & Sacrificío	CPM 22 – Depois De Um Longo Inverno; Ira! e Ultraje A Rigor – Ao Vivo No Rock In Rio; NX Zero – Multishow Ao Vivo NX Zero 10 Anos; RPM – Elektra	
2013	Jota Quest	Ao Vivo: Rock In Rio	Nevilton – Sacode!; Nando Reis e Os Infernais – Sei; Vespas Mandarinas – Animal Nacional; Vowe – Nossa Verdade	
2014	Erasmo Carlos	Gigante Gentil	Charlie Brown Jr. – La Familia 013; O Rappa – Nunca Tem Fim...; Nando Reis e Os Infernais – Sei, Como Foi Em BH; Titãs – Nheengatu	
2015	Suricato	Sol-Te	Banda do Mar – Banda do Mar; Humberto Gessinger – Insular Ao Vivo; Malta – Supernova; Pato Fu – Não Pare Pra Pensar	

=== Best Portuguese Language Rock or Alternative Album ===
Year	Performing artist(s)	Work	Nominees	Ref.
2016	Ian Ramil	Derivacivilização	Boogarins – Manual; Jay Vaquer – Canções de Exílio; Versalle – Distante em Algum Lugar	
2016	Scalene	Éter	Boogarins – Manual; Jay Vaquer – Canções de Exílio; Versalle – Distante em Algum Lugar	
2017	Nando Reis	Jardim-Pomar	The Baggios – Brutown; Blitz – Aventuras II; Curumin – Boca; Metá Metá – MM3	
2018	Lenine	Lenine em Trânsito	Tim Bernardes – Recomeçar; Kassin – Relax; Rubel – Casas; Jay Vaquer – Ecos do Acaso e Casos de Caos	
2019	BaianaSystem	O Futuro Não Demora	The Baggios – Vulcão; Chal – O Céu Sobre A Cabeça; Liniker e Os Caramelows – Goela Abaixo; Pitty – Matriz	
2020	Emicida	AmarElo	Ana Frango Elétrico – Little Electric Chicken Heart; Letrux – Letrux Ao Prantos; Rapadura – Universo Do Canto Falado; Suricata – Na Mão as Flores	
2021	A Cor do Som	Álbum Rosa	André Abujamra – Emidoinã; BaianaSystem – OxeAxeExu; Marcelo D2 – Assim Tocam Meus Tambores; Scalene – Fôlego; Velhas Virgens – O Bar Me Chama	
2022	Erasmo Carlos	O Futuro Pertence à... Jovem Guarda	Baco Exu do Blues – QVVJFA?; Criolo – Sobre Viver; Lagum – Memórias (De Onde eu Nunca Fui); Juçara Marçal – Delta Estácio Blues	
2023	Planet Hemp	Jardineiros	Lô Borges – Não Me Espere Na Estação; Rachel Reis – Meu Esquema; Tulipa Ruiz – Habilidades Extraordinárias; Titãs – Olho Furta-Cor	
2024	Erasmo Carlos	Erasmo Esteves	Cátia de França – No Rastro de Catarina; Ana Frango Elétrico – Me Chama de Gato Que Eu Sou Sua; Jovem Dionisio – Ontem Eu Tinha Certeza (Hoje Eu Tenho Mais); Lagum – Lagum Ao Vivo	
2025	BaianaSystem	O Mundo Dá Voltas	Maria Beraldo – Colinho; Tó Brandileone – Reações Adversas / Ao Persistirem Os Sintomas; Djonga – Quanto Mais Eu Como, Mais Fome Eu Sinto!; Jadsa – Big Buraco	
