= Arquivo (album) =

Compilation album by Os Paralamas do Sucesso
- Released: 1990
- Label: EMI

Os Paralamas do Sucesso chronology
Big Bang (1989)	Arquivo (1990)	Os Grãos (1991)

Professional ratings
Review scores
Source	Rating
allmusic	4.5/5 stars

Arquivo (Portuguese meaning "Archive") was Os Paralamas do Sucesso's first compilation album released in 1990. It contains the previously unreleased song Caleidoscópio (Kaleidoscope) and the remastered version of one of their greatest hits Vital E Sua Moto

== Track listing ==
1. "Caleidoscópio" (Herbert Vianna) – 3:31
2. "Óculos" (Herbert Vianna) – 3:39
3. "Cinema Mudo" (Herbert Vianna) – 3:47
4. "Alagados" (Herbert Vianna, Bi Ribeiro, João Barone) – 5:02
5. "Lanterna dos Afogados" (Herbert Vianna) – 3:10
6. "Melô do Marinheiro" (Bi Ribeiro, João Barone) – 3:28
7. "Vital e Sua Moto" (1990s version) (Herbert Vianna) – 3:30
8. "O Beco" (Herbert Vianna, Bi Ribeiro, João Barone) – 3:09
9. "Meu Erro" (Herbert Vianna) – 3:28
10. "Perplexo" (Herbert Vianna, Bi Ribeiro, João Barone) – 2:41
11. "Me Liga" (Herbert Vianna) – 3:49
12. "Quase Um Segundo" (Herbert Vianna) – 4:35
13. "Selvagem" (Herbert Vianna, Bi Ribeiro, João Barone) – 4:05
14. "Romance Ideal" (Herbert Vianna, Martin Cardoso) – 4:10
15. "Será que Vai Chover ?" (Herbert Vianna) – 5:36
16. "Ska" (Herbert Vianna) –
- Tracks 3 and 7 (remastered): Cinema Mudo
- Tracks 2, 9, 11, 14 and 16: O Passo do Lui
- Tracks 4, 6 and 13: Selvagem?
- Tracks 15: D
- Tracks 8 and 12: Bora-Bora
- Tracks 5 and 10: Big Bang

== Personnel ==
- Humberto Araujo – saxophone
- Demetrio Bezerra – trumpet, flugelhorn
- Seno Bezerra – trombone
- Jorge Davidson – art direction
- Vitor Farias – engineer, remixing, remastering
- Joao Fera – keyboards
- Charly García – piano
- Gilberto Gil – vocals
- Don Harris – trumpet
- Egeu Laus – graphic coordinator
- Liminha – guitar, keyboards, producer, remixing, phasing
- Armando Marcal – percussion
- Matos – trombone
- Monteiro Jr – saxophone
- Os Paralamas do Sucesso – producer
- Carlos Savalla – producer
- Claudio Torres – graphic design
- Mauricio Valladares – photography
