= Rock in Rio 1985 =

Live album by Os Paralamas do Sucesso
- Released: 2007
- Recorded: January 16, 1985
- Venue: City of Rock, Rio de Janeiro, Brazil
- Genre: Rock
- Length: 41:57
- Language: Portuguese
- Label: EMI, Som Livre

Os Paralamas do Sucesso chronology
Hoje (2005)	Rock in Rio 1985 (2007)	Brasil Afora (2009)

Rock in Rio 1985 is the fifth live album by brazilian rock band Os Paralamas do Sucesso, released in 2007. Was recorded at the Rock in Rio, in Rio de Janeiro, Brazil on January 16, 1985. Rock in Rio, more than an album is also one of the biggest music festival in the world. So far, Rock in Rio have been in four countries: Brazil, Spain, Portugal and United States.

== Track listing ==
All tracks are written by All songs written by Herbert Vianna, except where noted.

No.	Title	Writer(s)	Length
1.	"Mensagem de Amor"		5:04
2.	"Assaltaram a Gramática"	Lulu Santos, Waly Salomão	3:31
3.	"Patrulha Noturna"		3:41
4.	"Inútil"	Roger Moreira	2:56
5.	"Fui Eu"		3:19
6.	"Cinema Mudo"		4:33
7.	"Meu Erro"		3:31
8.	"Óculos"		7:13
9.	"Ska"		2:35
10.	"Vital e Sua Moto"		2:41
11.	"Química"	Renato Russo	2:53

== Personnel ==
- Herbert Vianna - vocals, guitar
- Bi Ribeiro - bass guitar
- João Barone - drums
