= 9 Luas =

Studio album by Os Paralamas do Sucesso
- Released: 1996
- Recorded: 1996
- Genre: Pop rock
- Label: EMI
- Producer: Os Paralamas do Sucesso

Os Paralamas do Sucesso chronology
Vamo Batê Lata (1995)	9 Luas (1996)	Hey Na Na (1998)

Professional ratings
Review scores
Source	Rating
AllMusic	3/5 stars

9 Luas (Portuguese for 9 Moons) is the eighth studio album by Brazilian rock band Os Paralamas do Sucesso, released in 1996. With this album, the Paralamas definitely abandon their previous new wave/ska/reggae rock style and adopt a more pop rock sonority, however without abandoning the Latino influences.

Main hits of this album include "Lourinha Bombril", "Capitão de Indústria", "Busca Vida", "O Caminho Pisado", "La Bella Luna" and "O Caroço da Cabeça" (previously recorded by Titãs and released in their 1995 album Domingo).

The song "De Música Ligeira" is a Portuguese-language cover of "De Música Ligera", originally by Argentine band Soda Stereo.

== Track listing ==
No.	Title	Lyrics	Length
1.	"Lourinha Bombril" (Bombril Blondie)	Bahiano, Diego Blanco, Herbert Vianna	2:38
2.	"Outra Beleza" (Another Beauty)	Herbert Vianna, Lulu Santos	3:06
3.	"La Bella Luna" (The Beautiful Moon)	Herbert Vianna	3:12
4.	"De Música Ligeira" (Of Light Music)	Gustavo Cerati, Héctor Bosio, Herbert Vianna	3:33
5.	"Capitão de Indústria" (Industry Captain)	Marcos Valle, Paulo Sérgio Valle	3:37
6.	"O Caminho Pisado" (The Stepped Way)	Herbert Vianna	3:27
7.	"Busca Vida" (Search Life)	Herbert Vianna	2:54
8.	"O Caroço da Cabeça" (The Head's Pit)	Herbert Vianna, Marcelo Fromer, Nando Reis	3:29
9.	"Sempre te Quis" (I Always Wanted You)	Herbert Vianna	2:43
10.	"Seja Você" (Be Yourself)	Herbert Vianna	2:28
11.	"Na Nossa Casa" (In our House)	Herbert Vianna	3:28
12.	"Um Pequeno Imprevisto" (A Little Mishap)	Herbert Vianna, Thedy Corrêa	3:11

== Personnel ==
- Bi Ribeiro – bass guitar
- Herbert Vianna – guitar, vocals
- João Barone – drums, percussion
