= Alagados =

Single by Os Paralamas do Sucesso

from the album Selvagem?
- Released: 1986
- Genre: Brazilian rock, latin rock
- Length: 5:00
- Label: EMI Records
- Songwriter(s): Bi Ribeiro, João Barone, and Herbert Vianna
- Producer(s): Liminha

"Alagados" is a song written by Bi Ribeiro, João Barone, and Herbert Vianna, which are the three members from Os Paralamas do Sucesso. It was featured in their third studio album, Selvagem?, released in 1986. It was voted by the Brazilian edition of Rolling Stone as the 63rd greatest Brazilian song.

== Information ==
The song describes the reality of Brazilian slums, more specifically in the city of Rio de Janeiro (specifically the verse "a cidade que tem braços abertos num cartão-postal" meaning "the city with open arms on a postcard") during the economic crisis that hit the nation in the 1980s, the "lost decade". In the chorus, the song draws a parallel between the slums in Trenchtown, Jamaica and the slums in Alagados, Salvador. The song portrays Rio de Janeiro as a place with "fists" which denies its poorest residents. A reference to the popularity of TV sets during that time was also done in the verse "a esperança não vem do mar, nem das antenas de tevê" ("hope does not come from the sea, nor from the TV antennas"). The song also showed how the Brazilian faith in an improvement in the quality of life seemed to be almost completely lost during that time.

In the background, the band used images of large pockets of poverty on beaches around the world—the slums of Alagados in Salvador, Trenchtown in Kingston, the capital of Jamaica and at Maré in Rio—to show the contrast between the cities' joy (these three cities were synonymous with the party) and sadness (mostly situated in its poor residents in the slums). The first stanza is about the people who live in poor living conditions in the dawn of the day, a great challenge since daybreak took away night's fantasy world (dreams) for the day's harsh realities] exemplified by stilts, warehouses and rags. The second stanza addresses the insensitivity of the authorities.

== Music video ==
The music video follows the song closely, showing scenes of slums in horrible conditions, garbage pick ups, street vendors and homelessness. It also shows the band walking through the scene of Rio's slums and even being searched by the police—getting the robber.
