= Acústico MTV: Os Paralamas do Sucesso =

Acústico MTV

Live album by Os Paralamas do Sucesso
- Released: 1999
- Recorded: June 5–6, 1999
- Label: EMI
- Producer: Léo Garrido

Os Paralamas do Sucesso chronology
Hey Na Na (1998)	Acústico MTV (1999)	Arquivo II (2000)

Professional ratings
Review scores
Source	Rating
Allmusic	4/5 stars

Acústico MTV is the third live album released by brazilian rock band Os Paralamas do Sucesso at the Parque Lage, in Brazil.

== Track listing ==
All songs written by Herbert Vianna, except where noted:

1. "Vulcão Dub / Fui Eu" (Herbert Vianna, Bi Ribeiro, João Barone / Herbert Vianna) – 4:47
2. "O Trem da Juventude" – 3:46
3. "Manguetown" (Chico Science, Lúcio Maia, Dengue) – 2:43
4. "Um Amor, Um Lugar" – 3:05
5. "Bora-Bora" – 3:03
6. "Vai Valer" – 3:26
7. "I Feel Good / Sossêgo" (James Brown / Tim Maia) – 4:05
8. "Uns Dias" – 4:01
9. "Sincero Breu" (Pedro Luís, Celso Alvim, Mauro Moura, C.A, Sidon Silva, Herbert Vianna) – 3:28
10. "Meu Erro" – 3:09
11. "Selvagem" (Herbert Vianna, Bi Ribeiro, João Barone) – 2:29
12. "Brasília 5:31" – 2:58
13. "Tendo a Lua" (Herbert Vianna, Tetê Tillet) – 3:19
14. "Que País é Esse?" (Renato Russo) – 3:37
15. "Navegar Impreciso" – 4:23
16. "Feira Moderna" (Fernando Brant, Beto Guedes, Lô Borges) – 3:02
17. "Tequila / Lourinha Bombril" (Chuck Rio / Diego Blanco, Bahiano (version by Herbert Vianna) – 4:16
18. "Vamo Batê Lata" – 3:49
19. "Life During Wartime" (David Byrne) – 4:19
20. "Nebulosa do Amor" – 3:23
21. "Caleidoscópio" – 4:16

== Personnel ==
- Herbert Vianna – vocals, acoustic guitar, 12-string guitar; semi-acoustic guitar in "I Feel Good / Sossêgo"
- Bi Ribeiro – acoustic bass guitar
- João Barone – drums, percussion
- João Fera - digital piano; cowbell in "Selvagem", tambourine in "Brasília 5:31"
- Eduardo Lyra - percussion
- José Monteiro Junior - tenor sax
- Demétrio Bezerra - trumpet
- Bidu Cordeiro - trombone; cowbell in "O Trem da Juventude"
- Dado Villa-Lobos – acoustic guitar, viola caipira; semi-acoustic guitar with e-bow in "Brasília 5:31"
- Zizi Possi – vocals in "Meu Erro"

== Awards ==
- 2000: Latin Grammy Award for Best Brazilian Rock Album

== Certification ==
Region	Certification	Certified units/sales
Brazil (Pro-Música Brasil)	Gold	100,000^{*}
^{*} Sales figures based on certification alone.
