= Os Grãos =

Studio album by Os Paralamas do Sucesso
- Released: 20 September 1991
- Recorded: May/June 1991
- Genres: Pop rock, new wave
- Label: EMI
- Producers: Carlos Savalla, Liminha, "Teabag V"

Os Paralamas do Sucesso chronology
Arquivo (1990)	Os Grãos (1991)	Severino (1994)

Os Grãos (Portuguese: The Grains) is the sixth studio album by Brazilian rock band Os Paralamas do Sucesso. It was released in September 1991.

== Track listing ==
No.	Title	Lyrics	Length
1.	"Tribunal de Bar" (Bar Court)	Bi Ribeiro, Herbert Vianna	2:50
2.	"Sábado" (Saturday)	Herbert Vianna	3:49
3.	"Tendo a Lua" (Having the Moon)	Herbert Vianna	3:41
4.	"Os Grãos" (The Grains)	Demétrio Bezerra, Herbert Vianna	3:37
5.	"Carro Velho" (Old Car)	Herbert Vianna	3:26
6.	"Vai Valer" (It'll be Worth It)	Herbert Vianna	3:36
7.	"Trac-Trac"	Fito Páez (version by Herbert Vianna)	3:51
8.	"O Rouxinol e a Rosa" (The Nightingale and the Rose)	Herbert Vianna	3:55
9.	"A Outra Rota" (The Other Route)	Herbert Vianna	2:40
10.	"Dai-nos" (Give Us)	Herbert Vianna	3:01
11.	"Ah, Maria"	Herbert Vianna	4:49
12.	"Não Adianta" (It's No Use)	Herbert Vianna	4:03
13.	"Trinta Anos" (Thirty Years)	Herbert Vianna	3:09

== Personnel ==
Os Paralamas do Sucesso

- Bi Ribeiro — bass; album cover concept; mixing
- João Barone — drums, percussion, programming; album cover concept; mixing
- Herbert Vianna — guitar, keyboards, vocals; album cover concept; mixing; production (as Teabag V)

Guest musicians

- Chico Neves — sequencer (on "Tribunal de Bar")
- Liminha — sequencer (on "Sábado" and "Ah, Maria"), guitar (on "Sábado")
- João Fera — keyboards (on "Sábado", "O Rouxinol e a Rosa" and "Dai-nos")
- Monteiro Jr. — saxophone and flute (on "Sábado", "Os Grãos", "Carro Velho", "Vai Valer" and "O Rouxinol e a Rosa")
- Senô Bezerra — trombone (on "Sábado", "Os Grãos", "Carro Velho", "Vai Valer" and "O Rouxinol e a Rosa")
- Demétrio Bezerra — trumpet and flugelhorn (on "Sábado", "Os Grãos", "Carro Velho", "Vai Valer" and "O Rouxinol e a Rosa")
- William Magalhães — electric piano (on "Tendo a Lua")
- Carlinhos Brown, Léo Bit-Bit and Tripé — percussion (on "Carro Velho")
- Jaques Morelenbaum — cello (on "Vai Valer" and "A Outra Rota")
- Denver Campolino — double bass (on "Vai Valer")
- Arlindo Penteado and Frederick Stephany — viola (on "Vai Valer" and "A Outra Rota")
- Hindemburgo Pereira and Murillo Loures — viola (on "A Outra Rota")
- Carlos Eduardo Hack, Gian Carlo Pareschi, José Alves, José Dias de Lana, João Daltro and Paschoal Perrotta — violin (on "Vai Valer" and "A Outra Rota")
- Aizik Geller and Alfredo Vidal — violín (on "A Outra Rota")
- Fernanda Abreu — backing vocals (on "Trac-Trac")
- Fito Páez — organ and piano (on "Trac-Trac" and "A Outra Rota"); backing vocals (on "Trac-Trac")
- Fábio Fonseca — keyboards (on "Trac-Trac" and "Não Adianta")
- Mário P.C. — baritone saxophone (on "A Outra Rota")

Production

- Liminha — production, recording, mixing
- Carlos Savalla — production, recording, mixing
- Franklin Garrido — recording
- Safira Hirsch — percussion recording
- Brad Gilderman — engineer, mixing
- Lawrence Ethan — mixing
- Steve Hall — mastering at Future Disc (original 1991 version)
- Chris Blair and Peter Mew — remastering at Abbey Road (1997 version)
- Márcio Paquetá — assistant engineer (except "A Outra Rota")
- Beto Pimentel and Jorge Rosa — assistant engineer (on "A Outra Rota")
- Helder Vianna — roadie
- Mauro Benzaquem — roadie, technician

Design

- Gringo Cardia — artwork, album cover concept
- Maurício Valladares — album cover concept, photography
- Egeu Laus — graphics
