= Vamo Batê Lata =

Live album by Os Paralamas do Sucesso
- Released: 1995
- Recorded: 1994
- Length: 54:59
- Label: EMI
- Producer: Carlos Savalla

Os Paralamas do Sucesso chronology
Severino (1994)	Vamo Batê Lata (1995)	Nove Luas (1996)

Professional ratings
Review scores
Source	Rating
Allmusic	3/5 stars

Vamo Batê Lata is the second live album released by brazilian rock band Os Paralamas do Sucesso, launched in 1995. Vamo Batê Lata had more than 900,000 copies sold in Brazil, the most sold of the band. The album comes in 2 CDs: the first one with live tracks, and the second one with studio recordings. Vamo Batê Lata included "Luis Inácio (300 Picaretas)" and "Uma Brasileira".

== Track listing ==
=== Disc one ===
1. "A Novidade" ("The Novelty") (Herbert Vianna, Bi Ribeiro, João Barone, Gilberto Gil) – 4:37
2. "Dos Margaritas" ("Two Daisies" - Spanish Writing) (Herbert Vianna, Bi Ribeiro) – 3:03
3. "Vamo Batê Lata" ("Let's Hit It")(Herbert Vianna) – 3:09
4. "Alagados" ("Victims Of Flood")(Herbert Vianna, Bi Ribeiro, João Barone) – 4:28
5. "Caleidoscópio" ("Caleidoscope")(Herbert Vianna) – 3:56
6. "Meu Erro" ("My Mistake")(Herbert Vianna) – 5:28
7. "Trac-Trac" (Fito Páez, version by Herbert Vianna) – 4:17
8. "O Rio Severino" ("Severino River") (Herbert Vianna) – 4:48
9. "Lanterna dos Afogados" ("The Drowned Ones' Light") (Herbert Vianna) – 4:56
10. "Um a Um" ("One to One") (Edgar Ferreira) – 3:02
11. "Você / Gostava Tanto de Você" (You / Liked you so much) (Tim Maia / Edson Trindade) – 2:58
12. "O Beco" ("The Alley") (Herbert Vianna, Bi Ribeiro) – 2:50
13. "Romance Ideal" ("Ideal romance") (Martim Cardoso, Herbert Vianna) – 4:34
14. "Não me Estrague o Dia / Sol e Chuva" (Don't ruin my day / Sun & rain) (Herbert Vianna, Bi Ribeiro / Alceu Valença) – 2:45

=== Disc two ===
1. "Uma Brasileira" ("A brazilian girl") (Carlinhos Brown, Herbert Vianna) – 3:40
2. "Saber Amar" ("To know How To Love") (Herbert Vianna) – 3:24
3. "Luis Inácio (300 Picaretas)" ("300 Jerks")(Herbert Vianna) – 3:19
4. "Esta Tarde" ("This afternoon") (Herbert Vianna) – 3:04

== Personnel ==
Paralamas do Sucesso

- Herbert Vianna - vocals, guitar, production
- Bi Ribeiro - bass guitar, production
- João Barone - drums, production

Additional musicians

- João Fera - keyboards
- Eduardo Lyra - percussion
- Monteiro Jr. - saxophone
- Senô Bezerra - trombone
- Demétrio Bezerra - trumpet, flugelhorn
- Charly García - piano on "Saber Amar"
- Maurício Barros - Hammond organ
- Ernie Watts - tenor saxophone
- Jairo Cliff - vocals on "Luis Inácio"

Production

- Carlos Savalla - co-production on "Uma Brasileira" and "Saber Amar"
- Liminha - co-production on "Uma Brasileira" and "Luis Inácio"
- Vitor Farias - recording, mixing
- Marcelo Sabóia - piano recording
- Larry Reed - sax recording
- Ronaldo Lima - organ recording
- Ricardo Essucy - mastering
- Marco Aurélio - studio assistant
- Pedro Ribeiro - production Assistant
- Chico Neves - samplers, programming

Design

- Gringo Cardia - artwork
- Leonardo Eyer - art assistant and CG
