= Cinema Mudo =

Studio album by Os Paralamas do Sucesso
- Released: 1983
- Recorded: EMI Studios, Rio de Janeiro City; 1982/1983
- Genre: Reggae rock, new wave, ska
- Length: 30:51
- Label: EMI
- Producer: Marcelo Sussekind

Os Paralamas do Sucesso chronology
Cinema Mudo (1983)	O Passo do Lui (1984)

Professional ratings
Review scores
Source	Rating
Allmusic	4/5 stars

Cinema Mudo (Portuguese for Silent Film) is the debut album by Brazilian rock band Os Paralamas do Sucesso. It was released in 1983 to critical acclaim, selling more than 90,000 copies.

The songs "Vital e a Sua Moto" and "Vovó Ondina É Gente Fina", the two main singles of the album, are homages to Vital Dias (the former drummer of the band) and bassist Bi Ribeiro's grandmother, respectively.

== Track listing ==
No.	Title	Lyrics	Length
1.	"Vital e Sua Moto" (Vital and His Motorcycle)	Herbert Vianna	3:10
2.	"Foi o Mordomo" (The Butler Did It)	Vianna	3:50
3.	"Cinema Mudo" (Silent Film)	Vianna	3:49
4.	"Patrulha Noturna" (Night Patrol)	Vianna	2:53
5.	"Shopstake"	Instrumental	3:00
6.	"Vovó Ondina É Gente Fina" (Granny Ondina Is Cool)	Vianna	1:59
7.	"O que Eu Não Disse" (What I Did Not Say)	Vianna, João Barone, Renato Russo	3:37
8.	"Química" (Chemistry)	Russo	3:01
9.	"Encruzilhada" (Intersection)	Vianna	2:56
10.	"Volúpia" (Lust)	Vianna	2:36

== Personnel ==
Os Paralamas do Sucesso

- Bi Ribeiro — bass
- Herbert Vianna — guitar, vocals, harpsichord in "Cinema Mudo"
- João Barone — drums, percussion

Additional musicians

- Léo Gandelman — metal arrangements in "Volúpia"
- Marcelo Sussekind — harpsichord in "Cinema Mudo"
- Lulu Santos — slide guitar in "O que Eu Não Disse"
- Ruban — keyboards in "Foi o Mordomo"
