= Hey Na Na =

Studio album by Os Paralamas do Sucesso
- Released: June 16, 1998
- Recorded: 1998
- Genre: Pop rock
- Label: EMI
- Producer: Chico Neves

Os Paralamas do Sucesso chronology
9 Luas (1996)	Hey Na Na (1998)	Acústico MTV (1999)

Professional ratings
Review scores
Source	Rating
Allmusic	4/5 stars

Hey Na Na is the ninth studio album by Brazilian rock band Os Paralamas do Sucesso. It was released on June 16, 1998. Main hits of the album include "Ela Disse Adeus", "O Amor Não Sabe Esperar" and "Depois Da Queda O Coice".

Former Legião Urbana guitarist Dado Villa-Lobos made a special appearance, providing guitars for some tracks.

== Track listing ==
No.	Title	Lyrics	Length
1.	"Por Sempre Andar" (Due to Always Walking)	Herbert Vianna	3:23
2.	"Depois da Queda, o Coice" (After the Fall, the Kick)	Herbert Vianna	4:09
3.	"O Trem da Juventude" (Youth Train)	Herbert Vianna	4:38
4.	"Brasília 5:31"	Herbert Vianna	3:24
5.	"O Amor Não Sabe Esperar" (Love Can't Wait)	Herbert Vianna	4:00
6.	"Ela Disse Adeus" (She Said Goodbye)	Herbert Vianna	4:28
7.	"Scream Poetry"	Chico Science, Herbert Vianna	3:00
8.	"Viernes, 3 a.m." (Friday, 3 a.m.)	Charly García, Herbert Vianna	4:36
9.	"Um Dia em Provença" (A Day in Provence)	Herbert Vianna, Thedy Corrêa	3:49
10.	"Santorini Blues"	Herbert Vianna	2:54

== Personnel ==
- Bi Ribeiro — bass
- Herbert Vianna — guitar, vocals
- João Barone — drums, percussion
