= Big Bang (Os Paralamas do Sucesso album) =

Studio album by Os Paralamas do Sucesso
- Released: November 20, 1989
- Recorded: August/September 1989
- Genres: Alternative rock, new wave
- Label: EMI
- Producers: Carlos Savalla, Os Paralamas do Sucesso

Os Paralamas do Sucesso chronology
Bora Bora (1988)	Big Bang (1989)	Arquivo (1990)

Big Bang is the fifth studio album by Brazilian rock band Os Paralamas do Sucesso. It was released in 1989.

Main hits of this album include "Lanterna dos Afogados" (one of the band's most well-known songs), "Nebulosa do Amor" and "Jubiabá" (a Portuguese-language adaptation of Alan Robert's and Lord Kitchner's "Give Me the Things").

== Covers ==
Portuguese gothic metal band Moonspell covered "Lanterna dos Afogados" for their 2017 album 1755.

== Track listing ==
No.	Title	Lyrics	Length
1.	"Perplexo" (Mesmerized)	Herbert Vianna	2:41
2.	"Dos Restos" (Of the Remains)	Herbert Vianna, Liminha	3:04
3.	"Pólvora" (Gunpowder)	Herbert Vianna	3:04
4.	"Nebulosa do Amor" (Love Nebula)	Herbert Vianna	3:12
5.	"Vulcão Dub" (Volcano Dub)	Instrumental	1:10
6.	"Se Você Me Quer" (If You Want Me)	Herbert Vianna	3:30
7.	"Rabicho do Cachorro Rabugento" (The Cranky Dog's Tail)	Herbert Vianna	1:21
8.	"Esqueça o que te Disseram Sobre o Amor (Vai Ser Diferente)" (Forget About What They Told You About Love [It Will Be Different])	Herbert Vianna, João Barone	3:49
9.	"Lanterna dos Afogados" (Lantern of the Drowned)	Herbert Vianna	3:09
10.	"Bang-Bang"	Herbert Vianna	3:29
11.	"Lá em Algum Lugar" (There Somewhere)	Herbert Vianna	3:27
12.	"Jubiabá"	Alan Robert, Lord Kitchner (version by Herbert Vianna)	2:40
13.	"Cachorro na Feira" (Dog in the Fair)	Herbert Vianna	1:18

== Personnel ==
Os Paralamas do Sucesso

- Bi Ribeiro — bass
- Herbert Vianna — guitar, vocals
- João Barone — drums, percussion, vocals in "Rabicho do Cachorro Rabugento" and "Cachorro na Feira"
