= Arquivo =

Arquivo may refer to:

- Portuguese and Spanish word for archive
- Arquivo (album), an album by Os Paralamas do Sucesso
- An album by Yahoo
