= Meu Erro =

Single by Os Paralamas do Sucesso

from the album O Passo do Lui
- Released: 1984
- Genre: Pop-Rock
- Label: EMI-Odeon

"Meu Erro" (Portuguese for "My Mistake") is a rock single by Os Paralamas do Sucesso that was a Brazilian hit. It was released in 1985, with great success among the Brazilian youth. Cover versions included two recorded by CPM 22 and Banda do Santa.

In 1999, an acoustic version by Brazilian singer Zizi Possi, included on her album Puro Prazer, was nominated for a Latin Grammy Award for Best Female Pop Vocal Performance.

== History ==
During the production of the album O Passo do Lui, the band singer Herbert Vianna break-up of the Kid Abelha singer Paula Toller. One of the most widely shared Interpretation about the song is that the song is about the lament of Vianna for the end of the relationship.

Another Interpretation about the song is that it's about the delusion and the lack of the perspective of the society after of the end of the military dictatorship in Brazil.

== Credits and personnel ==
Written by Herbert Vianna, record in the studios of EMI Odeon of Brasil, Rio de Janeiro in 1984.

- Herbert Vianna - vocal and guitar
- Bi Ribeiro - bass
- João Barone - drums
- Jotinha - Keyboard
