= Selvagem? =

Studio album by Os Paralamas do Sucesso
- Released: 1986
- Recorded: February/March 1986
- Genre: Reggae rock, MPB, ska
- Label: EMI
- Producer: Liminha

Os Paralamas do Sucesso chronology
O Passo do Lui (1984)	Selvagem? (1986)	D (1987)

Selvagem? (Portuguese for "Savage?") is the third studio album by Brazilian rock band Os Paralamas do Sucesso. It was released in 1986. "Você" is a cover of Tim Maia. Commenting on the track "Selvagem" in 2013, amidst the 2013 protests in Brazil, bassist Bi Ribeiro said he was impressed that the song was still in harmony with Brazilian conjuncture.

== Cover ==
The album cover, designed by Ricardo Leite, depicts bassist Bi Ribeiro's brother, Pedro Ribeiro, in a camp at a cerrado area near Brasília, now occupied by a residential condominium. The picture was taken after one week of no shower and limited food. Each camper dressed like a character and Pedro chose to be a "savage", wearing a judo belt and holding a bow given by a native Brazilian and with which they intended to hunt some birds. It was then hung upon a wall in the room where the band used to rehearse at the brothers' grandmother house, near posters of musicians like Alceu Valença, Jimi Hendrix and others.

Even before any song was composed, the band already knew that would be the cover and the character's name would be the title, even though the label was initially reluctant. According to Bi, the objective was "to challenge, provoke, show independence and that we could do what we wanted to do".

== Track listing ==
No.	Title	Lyrics	Length
1.	"Alagados" (Flooded)	Bi Ribeiro, Herbert Vianna, João Barone	5:04
2.	"Teerã" (Tehran)	Ribeiro, Vianna, Barone	4:28
3.	"A Novidade" (The News)	Ribeiro, Gilberto Gil, Vianna, Barone	3:12
4.	"Melô do Marinheiro" (Sailor Song)	Ribeiro, Barone	3:29
5.	"Marujo Dub" (Sailor Dub)	Instrumental	2:50
6.	"Selvagem" (Wild)	Ribeiro, Vianna, Barone	4:05
7.	"A Dama e o Vagabundo" (Lady and the Tramp)	Ribeiro, Vianna	4:21
8.	"There's a Party"	Vianna	2:27
9.	"O Homem" (The Man)	Ribeiro, Vianna	4:08
10.	"Você" (You — Tim Maia cover)	Maia	3:22
11.	"Teerã Dub" (Tehran Dub)	Instrumental	4:26

== Legacy ==
Selvagem? was ranked 39th at Rolling Stone Brasil's list of 100 Best Albums of Brazilian Music. In 2022, it was elected as one of the best Brazilian music albums of the last 40 years by a O Globo poll which involved 25 specialists, including Charles Gavin, Nelson Motta, and others.

== Personnel ==
- Bi Ribeiro — bass
- Herbert Vianna — guitar, vocals
- João Barone — drums, percussion, dialog in "Melô do Marinheiro"

== Additional musicians ==
- Liminha — keyboards on tracks 1–3, 10, guitar on track 1, phaser on track 1
- Gilberto Gil — vocals on track 1
- Armando Marçal — percussion on tracks 1,2,10
