= D (Os Paralamas do Sucesso album) =

Live album by Os Paralamas do Sucesso
- Released: 1987
- Recorded: 1987
- Genre: Rock, reggae, samba, ska
- Label: EMI

Os Paralamas do Sucesso chronology
Selvagem? (1986)	D (1987)	Bora-Bora (1988)

D is the first live album released by brazilian rock band Os Paralamas do Sucesso at the Montreux Jazz Festival in Switzerland.

The album already features João Fera on a musical keyboard and a special appearance by George Israel on a saxophone in "Ska". It also includes two unreleased songs, "Será Que Vai Chover?" and a re-recording of "Charles, Anjo 45" by Jorge Ben Jor,in addition to the band's classics. Despite being a performance outside of Brazil, the band was well received and had a very receptive audience.

== Track listing ==
All songs written by Herbert Vianna, except where noted:

1. "Será Que Vai Chover" – 5:28
2. "Alagados" (Bi Ribeiro, João Barone, Herbert Vianna) – 7:15
3. "Ska" – 2:55
4. "Óculos" – 7:05
5. "O Homem" (Bi Ribeiro, Herbert Vianna) – 4:32
6. "Selvagem" (Bi Ribeiro, João Barone, Herbert Vianna) – 4:51
7. "Charles, Anjo 45" (Jorge Ben Jor) – 4:47
8. "A Novidade" (Bi Ribeiro, João Barone, Gilberto Gil, Herbert Vianna) – 4:08
9. "Meu Erro" – 4:18
10. "Será Que Vai Chover?" (studio version) – 5:08

== Personnel ==
- Herbert Vianna - vocals, guitar
- Bi Ribeiro - bass guitar
- João Barone - drums, percussion
- João Fera - keyboards
- George Israel - saxophone in "Ska"
