= Longo Caminho =

Studio album by Os Paralamas do Sucesso
- Released: September 2002
- Recorded: March–June 2002
- Genre: Alternative rock
- Length: 35:50
- Label: EMI
- Producer: Carlo Bartolini

Os Paralamas do Sucesso chronology
Arquivo II (2000)	Longo Caminho (2002)	Uns Dias Ao Vivo (2004)

Professional ratings
Review scores
Source	Rating
CliqueMusic	(not rated) link

Longo Caminho (Portuguese for A Long Way) is the tenth studio album by Brazilian rock band Os Paralamas do Sucesso. It was released in 2002, one year after vocalist Herbert Vianna's accident with the ultralight plane that made him paraplegic. Most of the tracks were written before the accident.

Main hits of the album included "O Calibre", an aggressive song that is a critic to the urban violence, and the ballads "Cuide Bem do Seu Amor" and "Seguindo Estrelas". "O Calibre" would be featured on the soundtrack of the film Elite Squad: The Enemy Within eight years later its release.

"Soldado da Paz" was recorded by Cidade Negra in their MTV Unplugged album, while the title track was recorded by Zélia Duncan. Argentine musician Fito Páez, a recurring collaborator for the Paralamas, provided the organ for the song "Flores e Espinhos".

The track "Flores no Deserto" was written in honor of Marcelo Yuka, former drummer of the Brazilian rap rock band O Rappa. The track "Hinchley Pond" shares its name with a farm owned by the parents of Vianna's deceased wife, Lucy Needham Vianna.

"Amor em Vão" was recorded by Paulo Ricardo, bassist of the famous Brazilian band RPM. "Flores e Espinhos" was covered by Fat Family under the name "Sou Só Um".

The track "Running on the Spot" is a cover of the Jam.

The album has sold more than 350,000 copies. It also won Best Brazilian Rock Album at the 4th Annual Latin Grammy Awards.

== Track listing ==
All tracks are written by Herbert Vianna and Os Paralamas do Sucesso except for "Running on the Spot" by Paul Weller

No.	Title	Length
1.	"O Calibre" (The Caliber)	3:25
2.	"Seguindo Estrelas" (Following Stars)	4:13
3.	"Longo Caminho" (A Long Way)	3:22
4.	"Soldado da Paz" (Peace Soldier)	2:53
5.	"Cuide Bem do Seu Amor" (Take Good Care of Your Beloved One)	3:42
6.	"Amor em Vão" (Love in Vain)	3:13
7.	"Flores no Deserto" (Flowers in the Desert)	3:57
8.	"Running on the Spot" (The Jam cover)	3:11
9.	"Flores e Espinhos" (Flowers and Thorns)	3:08
10.	"La Estación" (The Station)	2:26
11.	"Hinchley Pond"	2:39

== DVD ==
The DVD documentary directed by Andrucha Waddington and was released in 2002. A mixture of recordings with presentations. It includes featured with its music of Paralamas's early career Pingüins (original title Pingüins Já Não os Vejo Pois Não Está na Estação), recorded a show for the parents, friends and employees of EMI in September 2002

=== Track listing ===
1. O Calibre
2. Seguindo Estrelas (Follow the Stars)
3. Longo Caminho (Long Way)
4. Alagados
5. Soldado da Paz
6. Cuide Bem do Seu Amor
7. Amor em Vão (Tudo Passará)
8. Flores no Deserto (Flowers in the Desert)
9. Running on the Spot
10. Flores e Espinhos (Flowers and Thorns)
11. La Estación (The Station)
12. Hinchley Pond
13. Flores no Deserto (Flowers in the Desert)
14. Pingüins (Penguins)
15. O Calibre
