= O Passo do Lui =

Studio album by Os Paralamas do Sucesso
- Released: 1984
- Recorded: July 1984
- Genres: Reggae rock, new wave, ska
- Label: EMI
- Producers: Marcelo Sussekind, Os Paralamas do Sucesso

Os Paralamas do Sucesso chronology
Cinema Mudo (1983)	O Passo do Lui (1984)	Selvagem? (1986)

Professional ratings
Review scores
Source	Rating
Allmusic	4/5 stars

O Passo do Lui (Portuguese for Lui's Step) is the second studio album by Brazilian rock band Os Paralamas do Sucesso. Released in 1984, it was the album that cemented Paralamas' popularity all over Brazil, with hits such as "Ska", "Meu Erro", "Me Liga" and "Romance Ideal". The album's name is a homage to Lui, a friend of Paralamas who, according to them, is a good dancer. Lui is also depicted on the front cover.

== Track listing ==
Side one

No.	Title	Lyrics	Length
1.	"Óculos" (Glasses)	Herbert Vianna	3:40
2.	"Meu Erro" (My Mistake)	Vianna	3:28
3.	"Fui Eu" (It Was Me)	Vianna	3:52
4.	"Romance Ideal" (Ideal Romance)	Martim Cardoso, Vianna	4:10
5.	"Ska"	Vianna	2:29

Side two

No.	Title	Lyrics	Length
6.	"Mensagem de Amor" (Love Message)	Vianna	4:18
7.	"Me Liga" (Call Me)	Vianna	3:49
8.	"Assaltaram a Gramática (featuring Lulu Santos and Scarlet Moon de Chevalier)" (The Grammar Was Assaulted)	Santos, Waly Salomão	2:52
9.	"Menino e Menina" (Boy and Girl)	Vianna	3:55
10.	"O Passo do Lui" (Lui's Step)	Instrumental	2:19

== Personnel ==
=== Os Paralamas do Sucesso ===
- Bi Ribeiro (credited as Felipe Bi Ribeiro) — bass
- Herbert Vianna — guitar, vocals
- João Barone — drums, percussion

=== Additional musicians ===
- Lulu Santos — backing vocals on "Assaltaram a Gramática"
- Scarlet Moon — backing vocals on "Assaltaram a Gramática"
- Jotinha - Keyboards on "Me Liga", "Óculos" and "Meu Erro"
- Ricardo Cristaldi - Keyboards on "Óculos" and "Assaltaram a Gramática".
- Paula Preuss - Backing vocals in "Me Liga" and "Fui Eu"
- Léo Gandelmann - Saxophone

=== Additional personnel ===
- Producer - Marcelo Sussekind
- Production manager - Mayrton Bahia
- Production assistant - Franklin Garrido
- Recording technicians - Franklin Garrido, Renato Luiz and José Celso
- Mixing technicians - Marcelo Sussekind and Franklin Garrido
- Studio auxiliary - Rob and Geraldo
- Cut - Osmar Furtado
- Cover art - Ricardo Leite
- Pictures - Maurício Valladares
- Graphic coordination - Gustavo Caio
