= Uma Brasileira =

Single by Paralamas do Sucesso

from the album Vamo Batê Lata
- Released: 1995
- Genre: Reggae, reggae fusion, rock
- Label: EMI
- Composers: Herbert Vianna; Carlinhos Brown

Paralamas do Sucesso singles chronology
"Saber Amar" (1994)	"Uma Brasileira" (1995)	"Capitão De Indústria" (1995)

Music video
- "Uma Brasileira" on YouTube

"Uma Brasileira" is a song by the Brazilian Rock Band Os Paralamas do Sucesso featuring the singer Djavan and being featuring in the album Vamo Batê Lata from 1995. Written by Herbert Viana and Carlinhos Brown. In Hispanic America country's the song was partially translated to Spanish and renamed as Una brasilera.

== Accolades ==
Awards and nominations for "Uma Brasileira"
Organization	Year	Category	Result	Ref.
MTV Video Music Brasil	1995	Music Video of the Year	Nominated	
MTV Video Music Brasil	1995	Audience Choice	Won	
MTV Video Music Brasil	1995	Pop Music Video	Won	
MTV Video Music Brasil	1995	Direção em Videoclipe	Nominated	

=== Weekly charts ===
Chart (1996)	Peak position
Peru (UPI)	6

== Certifications ==
Certifications for "Uma Brasileira"
Region	Certification	Certified units/sales
Brazil (Pro-Música Brasil)	Gold	50,000^{‡}
^{‡} Sales+streaming figures based on certification alone.
