= Hoje (Os Paralamas do Sucesso album) =

Studio album by Os Paralamas do Sucesso
- Released: 2005
- Label: EMI
- Producer: Liminha, Carlo Bartolini

Os Paralamas do Sucesso chronology
Uns Dias Ao Vivo (2004)	Hoje (2005)	Perfil: Vol. I (2006)

Hoje is the eleventh studio album by Brazilian rock band Os Paralamas do Sucesso. The songs were composed after Herbert Vianna's accident, unlike Longo Caminho. The album features three special participations: Manu Chao ("Soledad Cidadão (Me Llaman Calle)"), Marcelinho da Lua ("Ao Acaso") and Andreas Kisser ("Fora do Lugar" and "Ponto de Vista"). The track "Na Pista" received a video which was nominated for the 2006 MTV Video Music Brazil award.

== Track listing ==
All songs composed by Herbert Vianna, except where noted:

1. "2A" – 3:58
2. "Pétalas" (Petals) (Nando Reis) – 2:50
3. "Na Pista" (On the Track) – 3:31
4. "Soledad Cidadão (Me Llaman Calle)" (Solitude Citizen (They Call Me the Street)) (Manu Chao, version by Herbert Vianna, Pedro Luís) – 2:15
5. "Passo Lento" (Slow Pace) – 2:51
6. "De Perto" (Up Close) – 3:11
7. "Ao Acaso" (Random) – 3:52
8. "Hoje" (Today) – 3:17
9. "Fora de Lugar" (Out of Its Place) (Leoni) – 2:53
10. "220 Desencapado" (220V Live Wire) – 2:32
11. "Ponto de Vista" (Point of View) – 3:02 Suarez – Chwojres – Artochi –
12. "Deus Lhe Page" (God Bless) (Chico Buarque) – 4:20
13. "Ao Acaso Dub" (Random Dub) – 4:26
