= Brasil Afora =

Studio album by Os Paralamas do Sucesso
- Released: February 2009
- Recorded: 2008
- Genre: Brazilian rock
- Label: EMI
- Producer: Liminha

Os Paralamas do Sucesso chronology
Rock in Rio 1985 (2007)	Brasil Afora (2009)	Novelas (2010)

Brasil Afora (transl. All Over Brazil) is the twelfth album by Brazilian rock band Os Paralamas do Sucesso. The first single of the disc to be released to radio was A Lhe Esperar, released in January 2009. The second single was Meu Sonho, released in June 2009.

== Track listing ==
1. Meu Sonho (My Dream)
2. Sem Mais Adeus (No More Farewell) (feat. Carlinhos Brown)
3. A Lhe Esperar (Waiting for You)
4. El Amor (El Amor Después Del Amor) (Love (Love After Love)) (Fito Páez cover)
5. Quanto ao Tempo (As for the Time)
6. Aposte em Mim (Bet on Me)
7. Mormaço (Damp Weather) (feat. Zé Ramalho)
8. Taubaté ou Santos (Taubaté or Santos)
9. Brasil Afora (All Over Brazil)
10. Tempero Zen (Zen Spice)
11. Tão Bela (So Beautiful)
12. O Palhaço (The Clown) (only available for digital download)
