= Hubris I & II =

Studio album by Andreas Kisser
- Released: August 25, 2009
- Recorded: 2008–2009 at A Voz do Brasil Studios in Sao Paulo, Brazil
- Genre: Experimental rock, folk, progressive metal
- Length: 1:11:31
- Label: Mascot Records/RED Distribution
- Producer: Andreas Kisser, Jean Dolabella

Professional ratings
Review scores
Source	Rating
Allmusic	Not rated link
Sea of Tranquility	link

Hubris I & II is the debut solo studio album from Brazilian guitarist Andreas Kisser. It was released on August 25, 2009 through Mascot Records.

It is the first solo album Kisser has released and features ex-fellow Sepultura member Jean Dolabella (who also co-produced the album along with Kisser). It is a 2 disc set and contains 21 tracks, 10 on one disc and 11 on the other.

A music video was made for the song "Em Busca Do Ouro" and was aired on MTV Brasil. The song was written by Titãs guitarist Tony Bellotto and has the guest performance of Zé Ramalho, a Brazilian singer with whom Sepultura had already worked in a thrash version of "A Dança das Borboletas", a song from his debut album.

== Track listing ==
=== Hubris I ===
1. "Protest!" – 1:07
2. "Euphoria/Desperation" – 1:42
3. "Eu Humano" – 3:27
4. "The Forum" – 4:39
5. "Virgulandia" – 3:39
6. "God's Laugh" – 5:20
7. "R.H.E.T" – 4:18
8. "Em Busca Do Ouro" (featuring Zé Ramalho) – 4:38
9. "Lava Sky" – 3:36
10. "A Million Judas Iscariotes" – 6:22

=== Hubris II ===
1. "Sad Soil" – 2:00
2. "World's Apart" – 2:48
3. "Breast Feeding" – 3:15
4. "Page" – 3:55
5. "Domenicana" – 3:39
6. "Vivaldi" – 2:27
7. "0120" – 3:48
8. "Armonia" – 1:39
9. "Hubris" – 4:29
10. "Mythos" – 1:59
11. "O Mais Querido" – 2:34

== Personnel ==
- Andreas Kisser – vocals, guitars, bass, producer
- Jean Dolabella – drums, percussion, co-producer
- Henrique Portugal – keyboards
- Fabio Azeitona – percussion, wind instruments
- Renato Zanuto – piano
- Vasco Faé – vocals, harmonica
- Stanley Soares – mixing, mastering
