= Andreas Kisser =

Brazilian guitarist (born 1968)

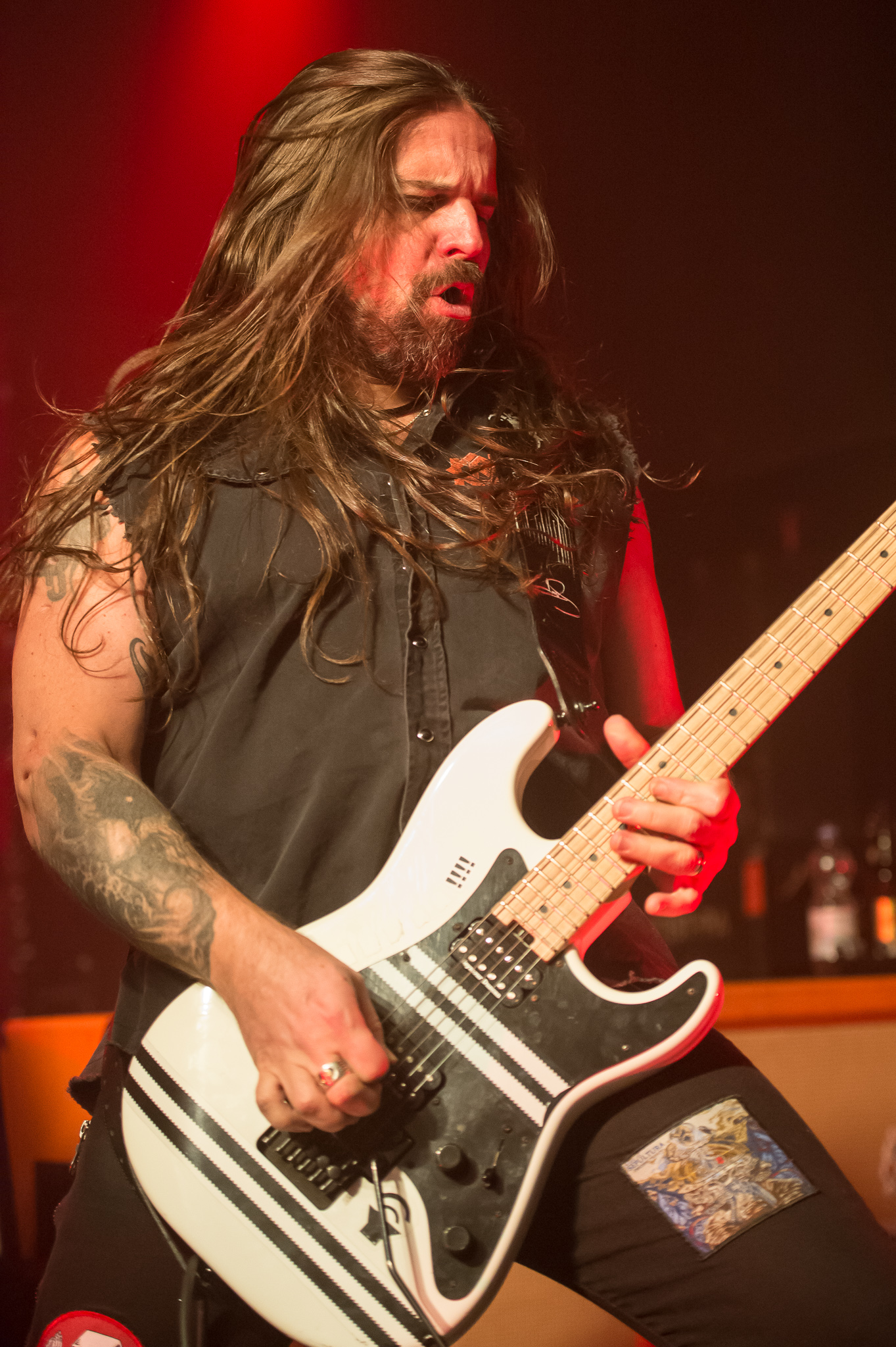
- Kisser in 2018

Background information
- Born: Andreas Rudolf Kisser; 24 August 1968 (age 58); São Bernardo do Campo, São Paulo, Brazil
- Genres: Heavy metal; thrash metal; death metal; groove metal; alternative metal; experimental rock; folk
- Occupations: Musician; songwriter
- Instrument: Guitar
- Years active: 1980–present
- Member of: De La Tierra; Kisser Clan
- Formerly of: Sepultura; Anthrax; Hail!; Asesino
- Website: Andreas Kisser on X

Andreas Rudolf Kisser (Portuguese: [ˈɐ̃dɾeɐz ʁuˈdowf ˈkiseʁ]; born 24 August 1968) is a Brazilian musician, best known for being the lead guitarist for the metal band Sepultura for 39 years until their breakup in 2026. He had been featured on every Sepultura release since their second album, Schizophrenia. Additionally, Kisser has also been involved in other bands such as the rock supergroup Hail!, Sexoturica and, more recently, De La Tierra.

== Biography ==
Kisser was born in São Bernardo do Campo, a municipality in São Paulo to a Slovene mother from Maribor, Anna Maria Kisser (née Tarkusch), and a German father, Siegfried Kisser. His father was a mechanical engineer and his mother was a teacher and amateur artist. At an early age, Kisser showed an interest in music.

He was 10 when he started to listen to his parents' records of the Beatles, Roberto Carlos and Tonico & Tinoco. He received his first acoustic guitar from his grandmother and later won a second guitar at a game of Bingo. In his early adolescence, Kisser started to play acoustic guitar first learning basic chords from the Brazilian popular music repertoire and later on classical pieces. A friend then introduced Kisser to hard rock with bands like Queen and Kiss which had a great influence on him. In 1983, he went to see Kiss live in São Paulo and his father took him to Rock In Rio in 1985 to see AC/DC. Kisser eventually got his first electric guitar, a Giannini-Supersonic, and an overdrive pedal. Kisser's first guitar was purchased for him by his mother.

== Musical style and influences ==
Some of his major influences consisted then of Eddie Van Halen, Eric Clapton, Jimi Hendrix, Steve Howe, Tony Iommi, Ritchie Blackmore, Jimmy Page and Randy Rhoads.

== Career ==
Kisser started performing in 1984 in a three-piece band called Esfinge, which he formed with school friends and where he played guitar and sang. The band mostly played covers of heavy metal bands such as Black Sabbath, Ozzy Osbourne, Iron Maiden, Venom and Metallica. Two years later the band renamed itself Pestilence and, in 1987, recorded a demo called Slaves of Pain. The songs on the demo were afterwards reused by Sepultura on their albums Schizophrenia and Beneath the Remains. Pestilence was, however, short-lived and ultimately split up.

=== Sepultura ===
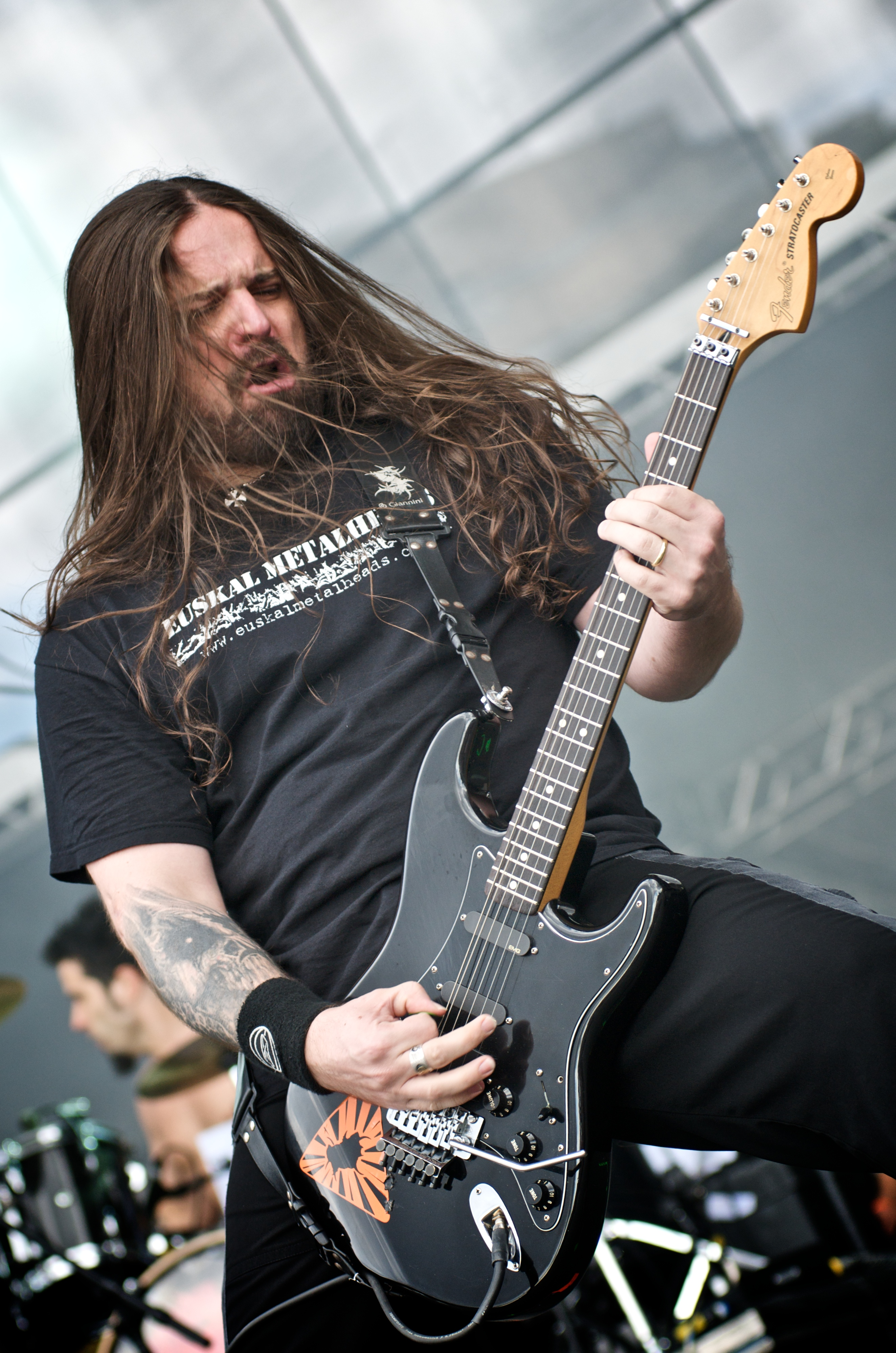
Andreas Kisser playing with Sepultura during the Maquinária Festival

In 1987, Kisser met the members of Sepultura and went to see the band play live while he was on a vacation trip to Belo Horizonte. On the day of the concert he joined the band as an improvised roadie for vocalist/guitarist Max Cavalera. He also jammed with the members during the intermissions. Following the departure of original lead guitarist Jairo Guedes, Kisser auditioned for the position of lead guitarist. The same year he performed with the band for the first time in Caruaru, Pernambuco and recorded the album Schizophrenia. His involvement in Sepultura helped shape the band's evolving sound. Max Cavalera said of him:

"... he brought new ideas and influences into Sepultura. The result was Schizophrenia."

On Schizophrenia and Beneath the Remains, Kisser co-wrote the lyrics with Max, whereas the whole band wrote the music. For Arise and thereafter Kisser began to write songs of his own. Kisser has also occasionally provided backing vocals both live and on the records. He also fronted the band in 1996, at the Castle Donington Monsters of Rock festival, when Max Cavalera was forced to absent himself in order to attend the funeral of his stepson Dana Wells.

Kisser remained in Sepultura until the band's dissolution in 2026; with a span of 39 years, he (along with bassist Paulo Jr., who joined shortly after the band's formation in 1984) was one of the longest-serving members of the band.

=== Hail! ===
Kisser is also a member of the metal tribute band Hail!. That band's rotating cast of members include Tim "Ripper" Owens, Paul Bostaph, David Ellefson, Mike Portnoy, Jimmy DeGrasso, Phil Demmel and Roy Mayorga. Hail! Was formed in the late 2008 by Ellefson and music manager Mark Abbattista. The band's original lineup, which consisted of DeGrasso, Ellefson, Kisser and Owens, started a series of concerts in 2009 in Chile. The band then toured Europe and played an exclusive concert in Lebanon. In 2010, Hail! went on a second European tour and played a number of US shows with the following line-up: Andreas Kisser, Tim "Ripper" Owens, Paul Bostaph and James LoMenzo.

=== De La Tierra ===
In December 2012, Kisser formed the Latin American supergroup De La Tierra with Alex González of Maná, Andrés Giménez of A.N.I.M.A.L. and Sr. Flavio of Los Fabulosos Cadillacs. The band first released a teaser and a number of behind-the-scene footages of the recording before releasing their debut single "Maldita Historia" in 2013.

=== Film composition ===
Kisser worked on three Brazilian movie soundtracks. For No Coração dos Deuses ("In the Heart of Gods"), a 1999 drama film, he worked on the score with Igor Cavalera and Mike Patton. The soundtrack was recorded at the Estudio ION in São Paulo in June 1998 and produced by André Moraes. In 2001 Kisser worked alongside Tony Bellotto, Eduardo de Queirós, Charles Gavin on the score of the award-winning crime film Bellini and the Sphinx. Kisser collaborated again on the soundtrack for the 2008 sequel Bellini and the Devil.

=== Solo work ===
In August 2009, Kisser released his solo debut album entitled Hubris I & II. When not active with Sepultura Kisser experimented musical ideas, wrote and recorded demo material, some of which had been gestating for 15 years prior to the album's release. In 2007, he uploaded a few short videos of the recording process through his YouTube account. It finally took Kisser 6 years to complete the album during which he handled a great part of the production duties himself. In the months following the release Kisser played a few shows in Brazil to promote the album and took part in a music video shoot for the song "Em Busca Do Ouro". The album was eventually nominated at the 2010 Latin Grammys in the "Best Brazilian Rock Album" category.

=== Guest work and collaborations ===
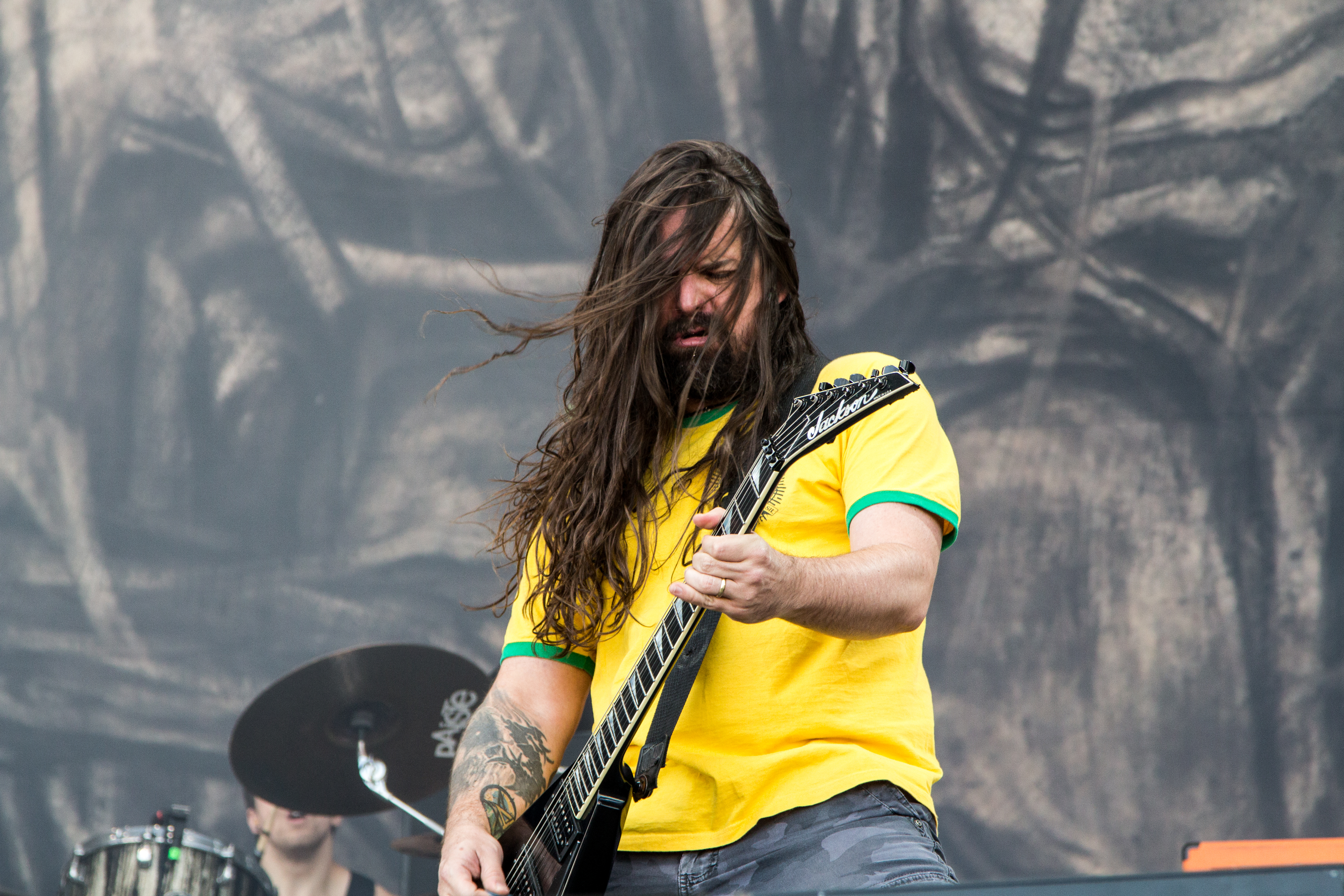
Andreas Kisser at Nova Rock Festival 2014

Kisser worked on various musical projects. Between 1995 and 1996 Kisser recorded a number of demo tracks with Jason Newsted and Tom Hunting under different monikers. For the first project the trio recorded three demo tracks under the name Sexoturica which later became part of the compilation album IR8 vs. Sexoturica. For the second project, called Quarteto da Pinga and which included Robb Flynn, they recorded two tracks and a cover. In 1996 Kisser renewed his collaboration with Newsted on another project called Godswallop which included Carl Coletti on drums and Sofia Ramos on vocals.

Furthermore, Kisser has made multiple guest appearances on other bands' albums, providing additional (lead) guitar and/or vocal accompaniment. He has been featured on the album of bands such as Asesino, Astafix, Biohazard, Burning in Hell, Claustrofobia, Korzus, Krusader, Nailbomb, Ratos de Porão and The AK Corral. In 2005, Kisser took part in the recording of the Roadrunner United album. He played guitar on the tracks "The Enemy", "Baptized in the Redemption", and "No Mas Control". He also played at the 25th Anniversary Concert. In 2008 Kisser worked on a Brazilian Beatles tribute album Álbum Branco, which was recorded at the Bavini Studio in São Paulo. He played guitar on the tracks Piggies and Helter Skelter.

Beside his work as musician, Kisser has been involved in projects as producer. In 1992 Kisser co-produced Hammerhead's album Shadow of a Time to Be. In 2004 he recorded three songs for the Brazilian rock band Sayowa which appeared on the band's debut album Treme Terra. The same year he helped produce Necromancia's album Check Mate and provided additional guitar and backing vocal on the album's title track "Greed Up to Kill". In 2006 he produced Sayowa's second Album. The album was also co-produced by the band itself and Stanley Soares.

=== Other musical endeavors ===
In 1992, Kisser unsuccessfully auditioned for the temporary position of rhythm guitarist of Metallica, as a temporary replacement of James Hetfield, who had suffered severe burns on his left hand and arm during a live show in Montreal. Kisser had been recommended to Metallica through Phil Rind of Sacred Reich who was well acquainted with Jason Newsted.

In 2008, he took part in the Scorpions Humanity World Tour in Mexico and Brazil as a guest musician, recording the "Amazônia - Live in the Jungle" DVD.

In 2011, Kisser replaced Anthrax guitarist Scott Ian for some European tour dates (2–16 July), including the Big 4 Sonisphere Festival shows in Gothenburg, Sweden as well as Knebworth, UK and Amneville, France, as Ian and his wife Pearl Aday were expecting the birth of their first child.

Kisser played a few concerts with Brazilian Beatles cover band Clube Big Beatles in The Cavern Club in Liverpool and, in August 2012, was given his own brick in the Cavern Club's wall of fame. He thus became the first Brazilian to have one, and the first modern metal guitarist to be honored in that way.

== Equipment ==
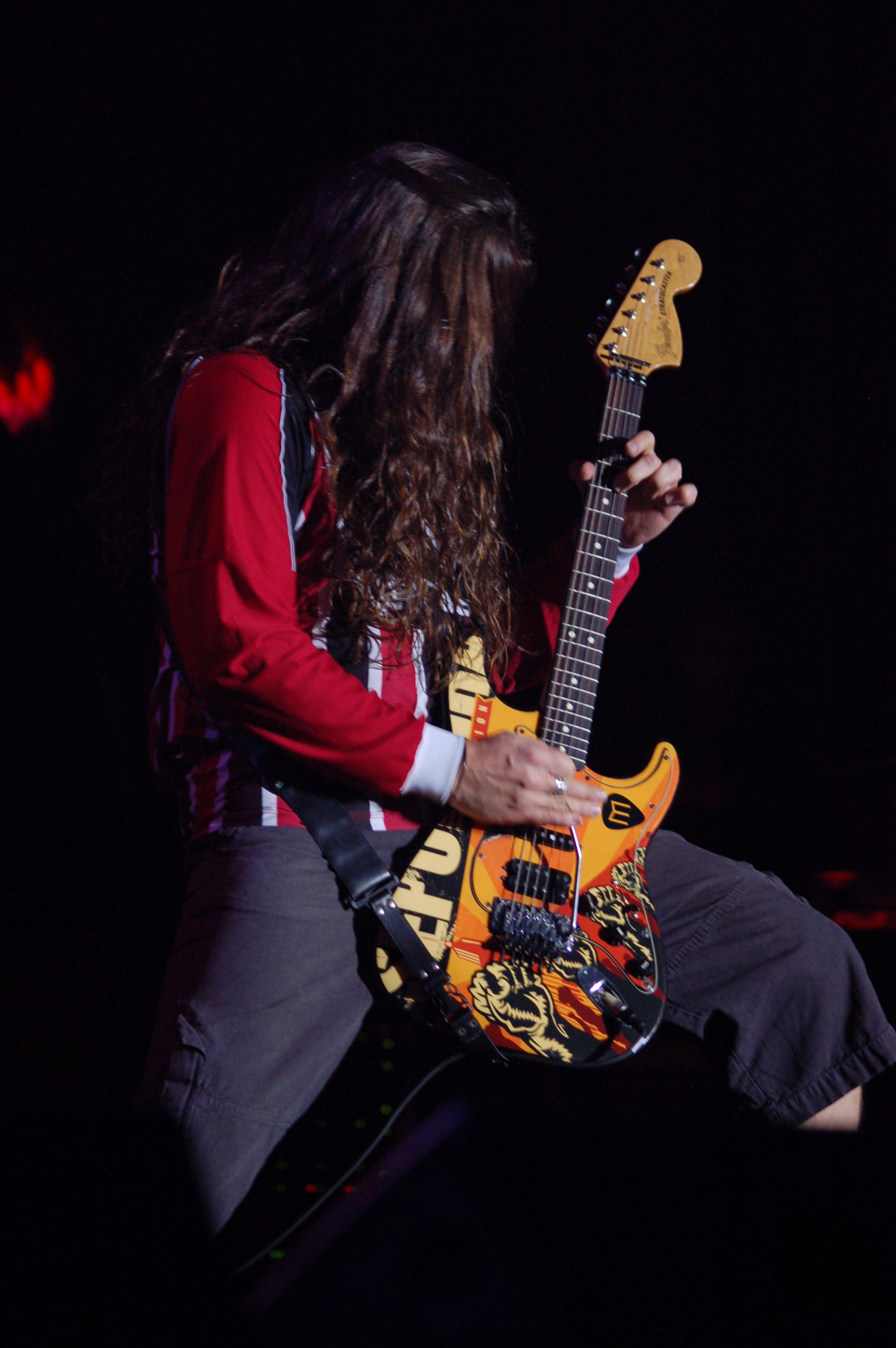
Andreas Kisser playing guitar during the Metamania festival, 2007

=== Guitars ===
Kisser currently uses Fender, Jackson and Seizi guitars. He has been endorsing Fender guitars since 2002 and Seizi guitars since 2011. Seizi guitars is currently in the process of releasing a signature model. Throughout his career Kisser has used a number of guitars from different companies. In 2001/2002 he endorsed the Squier Stagemaster/Showmaster Deluxe V4 neck-through model. When he started with Sepultura he used an Ibanez guitar. Later he acquired a Charvel Model 2 and Jackson Randy Rhoads which he used extensively and continues to use on recordings. In the 1990s Kisser also used and endorsed ESP and Fernandes guitars. His guitars are tuned to D standard and Bb standard. When touring he takes four guitars with him, two for each tuning. Kisser has a collection of about 40 guitars including:

- Charvel Model 2
- ESP Explorer
- ESP Horizon 3
- ESP Viper
- Fender Stratocaster
- Fernandes AFR-150S
- Ibanez RG440
- Jackson Soloist
- Jackson Randy Rhoads
- Seizi Mosh (custom built)

=== Amplifiers and cabinets ===
For amplification, Kisser uses a Mesa Boogie Triaxis preamplifier which he runs through two amplifier heads and two to four 4x12 cabinets. He endorses Mesa Boogie and Meteoro Amplifiers, a Brazilian company that released his signature amplifier models. Before switching to Mesa Boogie, Kisser used an ADA MP-1 MIDI Preamplifier and Marshall amplifiers.

- Mesa Boogie Triaxis
- Mesa Boogie Strategy 500 Power Amplifier
- Mesa Boogie Triple Rectifier
- Mesa Boogie 4x12 cabinets
- EVH 5150
- Marshall JCM 800 2204
- Marshall 4x12 cabinets
- Meteoro MAK 3000
- Orange Rockerverb

=== Effects and Accessories ===
Kisser uses a MXR Carbon Copy and his signature Cry Baby Wah for effects when playing live. He endorses Dunlop Manufacturing, SG strings and Zoom.

- Boss CH-1 Super Chorus
- Dunlop Buddy Guy Crybaby Wah
- Dunlop Andreas Kisser Crybaby Wah
- Morley Wah
- MXR Carbon Copy Analog Delay
- Rocktron Hush Super C
- Dunlop 0.88mm and James Hetfield Black Fang 0.96mm picks
- SG signature strings (.10-.46 and .13-.56)

=== Guitar Rig and signal flow ===
A detailed gear diagram of Andreas Kisser's 2004 Sepultura guitar rig is well-documented.

== Personal life ==
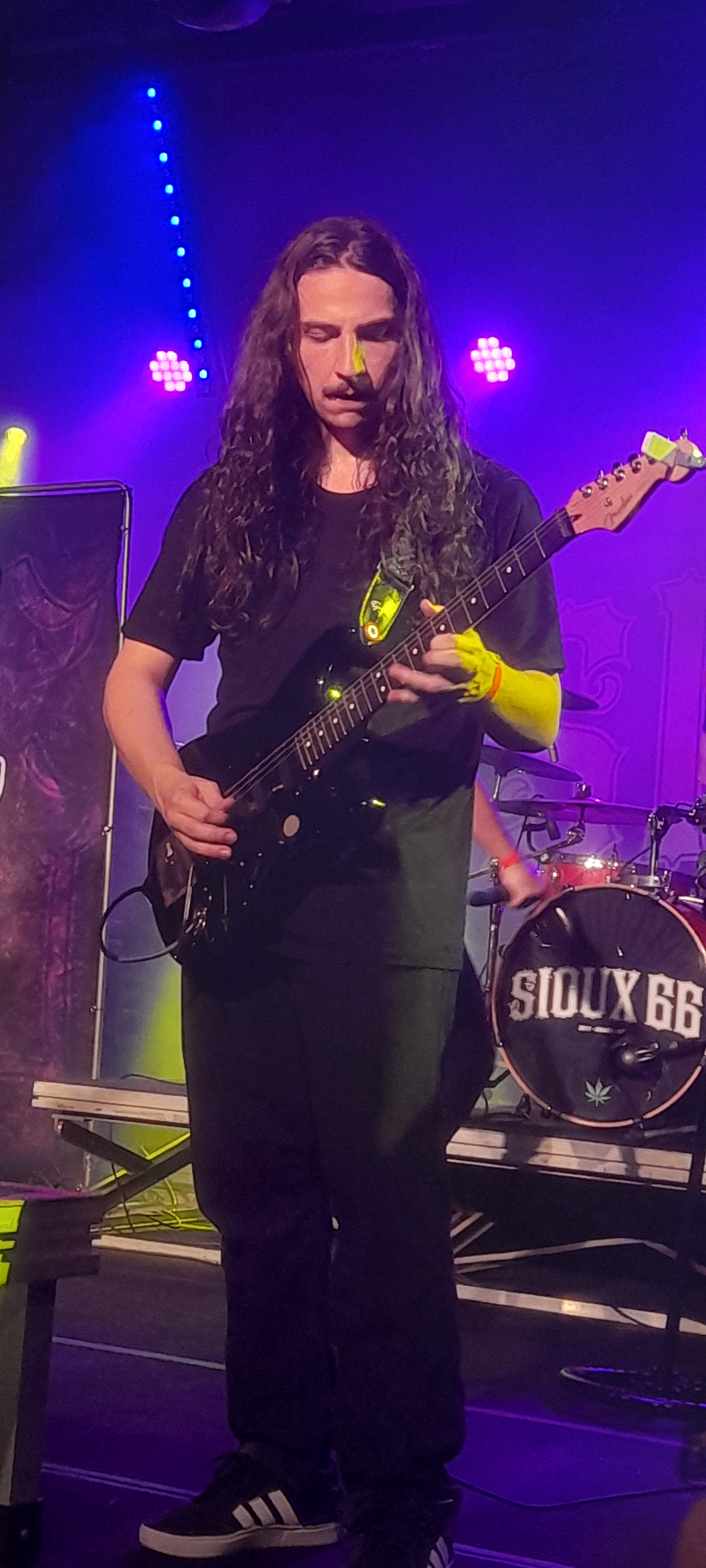
Kisser's middle son Yohan live with his band Sioux 66 in 2023.

He was married to Patricia Perissinotto Kisser, and has three children: Giulia (born in 1995), Yohan (born in 1997), and Enzo (born in 2005). Patricia died on 3 July, 2022, from colon cancer. A football fan, he supports São Paulo FC. Aside from his musical career, Kisser has also participated in a number of extra activities. In 2010, he wrote a weekly column for Yahoo! Brasil Music and since January 2013, he has been hosting his own radio show with his son Yohan. The show is called Pegadas de Andreas Kisser ("Andreas Kisser's Footprints") and is aired on the Brazilian radio station 89FM Rádio Rock.

== Discography ==
Pestilence

- 1987: Slaves of Pain (demo)

Sepultura

- 1987: Schizophrenia
- 1989: Beneath the Remains
- 1991: Arise
- 1993: Chaos A.D.
- 1996: Roots
- 1998: Against
- 2001: Nation
- 2002: Revolusongs (EP)
- 2003: Roorback
- 2006: Dante XXI
- 2009: A-Lex
- 2011: Kairos
- 2013: The Mediator Between Head and Hands Must Be the Heart
- 2017: Machine Messiah
- 2020: Quadra
- 2026: The Cloud of Unknowing (EP)

Quarteto da Pinga

- 1995: Demo

Sexoturica

- 1995: SpermogoDemo (demo)
- 2003: IR8 / Sexoturica

Solo albums

- 2009: Hubris I & II

De La Tierra

- De La Tierra (2014)
- II (2016)
- III (2023)

=== Guest session ===
The AK Corral

- 2004: A Different Brand of Country

Die Apokalyptischen Reiter

- 2009: Adrenalin

Asesino

- 2006: Cristo Satánico

Astafix

- 2009: End Ever

Biohazard

- 2001: Uncivilization

Burning in Hell

- 2006: Believe

Claustrofobia

- 2005: Fulminant

Clutch

- 1993: A Shogun Named Marcus

Korzus

- 2004: Ties of Blood

Krusader

- 2009: Angus

Metal Allegiance

- 2015: Metal Allegiance

Nailbomb

- 1994: Point Blank

Necromancia

- 2001: Check Mate

Os Paralamas do Sucesso

- 2005: Hoje on "Fora do Lugar" and "Ponto de Vista"
- 2008 - Paralamas e Titãs Juntos e Ao Vivo on "Selvagem/Polícia" and "Lugar Nenhum"

Ratos de Porão

- 1987: Cada Dia Mais Sujo e Agressivo / Dirty and Aggressive

Roadrunner United

- 2005: The All-Star Sessions

Sallaberry

- 2007: Samba Soft

Scorpions

- 2009 - Amazônia: Live in the Jungle on Always Somewhere, Holiday, Dust in the Wind, Wind of Change and Rock You Like a Hurricane

Hell:on

- 2015 - Once Upon a Chaos on Salvation in Death

Titãs

- 1995: Domingo on "Brasileiro"
- 2008: Paralamas e Titãs Juntos e Ao Vivo on "Selvagem/Polícia" and "Lugar Nenhum"
- 2009: Sacos Plásticos on "Deixa Eu Entrar"

Various

- 2005: Subdivisions [Tribute to Rush]
- 2008: Álbum Branco
