= Bahiano =

Argentine reggae singer

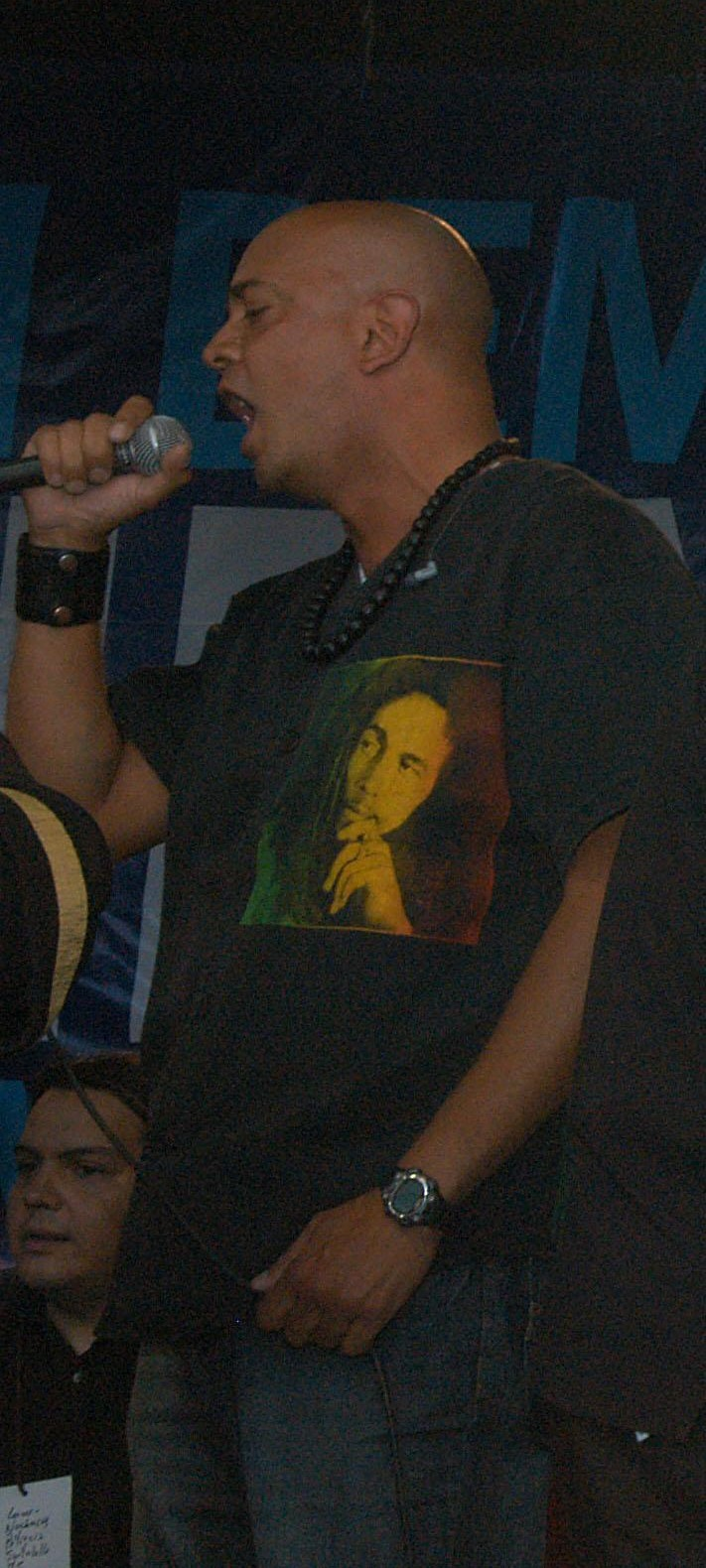

Fernando Javier Luis Hortal (born December 26, 1962), known professionally as Bahiano is an Argentine reggae singer. He has worked with Los Pericos, and started a solo career in 2004.

== Discography ==
=== With Los Pericos ===
- El ritual de la banana (1987)
- King Kong (1988)
- Maxi anfitreu (1989)
- Rab a Dab Stail (1990)
- Big Yuyo (1992)
- Maxi 1992 (1992)
- Los Maxis (1994)
- Pampas Reggae (1994)
- Yerba buena (1996)
- Mystic Love (1998)
- 1000 vivos (2000)
- Desde cero (2002)

=== Solo career ===
- BH+ (2005)
- Nomade (2008)
- Rey mago de las nubes (2011)
- Celebremos (2015)
- Original Roots (2019)
- Mucha Experiencia (2022)
