= Os Paralamas do Sucesso =

Brazilian pop rock band

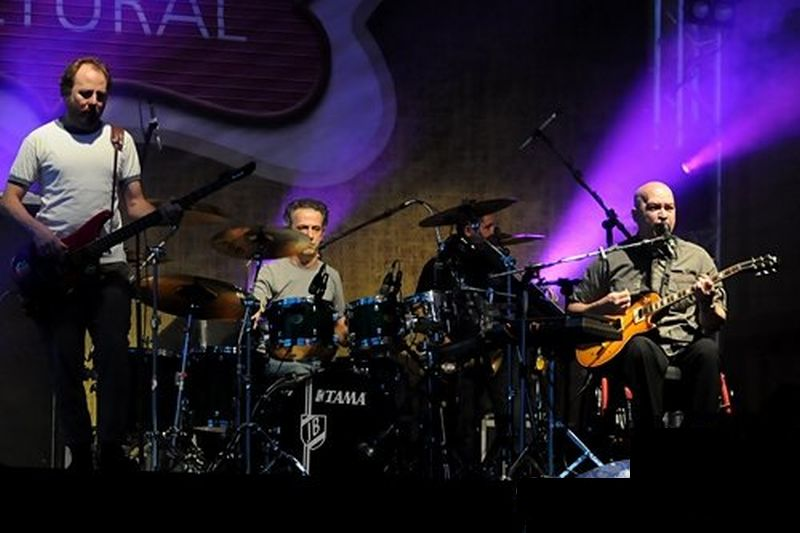
- Os Paralamas do Sucesso performing in Brasília, October 2008

Background information
- Origin: Rio de Janeiro, RJ, Brazil
- Genres: New wave; reggae rock; ska; pop rock
- Years active: 1977–present
- Label: EMI
- Members: Herbert Vianna; Bi Ribeiro; João Barone
- Past members: Vital Dias
- Website: osparalamas.com.br

Os Paralamas do Sucesso (also known simply as Paralamas) is a Brazilian rock band, formed in Rio de Janeiro in 1977. Its members since 1982 are Herbert Vianna (guitar and lead vocals), Bi Ribeiro (bass), and João Barone (drums). In its beginning, the band combined reggae and ska with rock, but later added horn arrangements and Latin rhythms.

== History ==
=== Beginnings ===
Although considered part of the "Brasília gang", because they lived there and were friends with local bands, Paralamas were formed in Rio de Janeiro. Herbert Vianna and Felipe "Bi" Ribeiro were childhood friends and neighbors in that city. Herbert's father was in the military, while Bi's was a diplomat. In 1977, Herbert went to Rio to attend military school, and met Bi once again. They decided to form a band, Herbert with his Gibson guitar and Bi, which had no musical training whatsoever, with a bass guitar bought during a trip to England. The drummer Vital Dias would later join them. They parted ways in 1979, around the time all of them were busy studying for their vestibular tests, but resumed their musical activity in 1981.

The trio rehearsed in the house of Bi's grandmother (which provided inspiration for the song "Vovó Ondina é Gente Fina", or "Grandma Ondina is Really Cool") and in a farm in Mendes, and performed in small venues. Their setlist was not quite serious (with songs like "Pingüins, Já Não Os Vejo Pois Não Está na Estação", or "I No Longer See Penguins, Because They're Out of Season"), and they tried to create a name for the band in the same spirit, with the first option being "As Cadeirinhas da Vovó", or "Grandma's Little Chairs". The name "Paralamas do Sucesso" (meaning "Mudflaps of Success") was coined by Bi, and adopted because all three of them thought it was really funny. In the beginning, Herbert was only the guitar player, and the group had two lead singers, Ronel e Naldo, both of whom departed in 1982.

In 1982, Vital missed a gig at the Universidade Federal Rural do Rio de Janeiro in Seropédica, and was replaced by João Barone, which became the drummer after he decided to leave the band. Vital would later inspire the demo song "Vital e sua Moto", which the band sent to FM station Rádio Fluminense, which was the first to broadcast many bands that would eventually achieve national recognition in Brazil. The song received substantial airplay in the summer of 1983, and the Paralamas made their first major appearance opening for Lulu Santos, another popular singer of their generation, in the Circo Voador. It was around that time when they signed a deal with EMI Brasil to record their first album Cinema Mudo (later defined by Herbert as "manipulated by the record company people"), which achieved moderate success.

=== Breakthrough ===
In 1984, they released their second album, O Passo do Lui. It spanned the hits "Óculos", "Me Liga", "Meu Erro", "Romance Ideal", and "Ska", leading the band to perform at the first edition of Rock in Rio, in which Paralamas' concert was considered one of the best.

After a national tour, they released Selvagem? in 1986. The album opposed the "manipulation" of the band's first release from its cover (featuring Bi's younger brother in the middle of the woods wearing only a shirt around his waist) and incorporated a bold mixture of reggae, rock and African rhythms. Produced by Liminha (former bass player for Os Mutantes), it spanned the hits "Alagados", "A Novidade" (their first collaboration with Gilberto Gil, and the second track co-written with him), "Melô do Marinheiro", and "Você" (a cover version of a Tim Maia song), and sold over 700,000 copies. This led the Paralamas to play in the Montreux Jazz Festival the following year.

In 1987, the band released their first live album, D, recorded from their performance in Montreux. It was the first album to feature the band's constant collaborator, keyboard player João Fera, who still tours with the band today. After Montreux, Paralamas also played in L'Olympia and toured through South America, becoming popular in Argentina, Chile, Uruguay, and Venezuela.

Their fourth studio album, Bora-Bora, was released in 1988. It introduced the usage of piano, horns and sampling by the band. The album has both social-political focused songs such as "O Beco" and more introspective tracks, such as "Quase Um Segundo" (thought to be about the end of Vianna's relationship with Paula Toller, the lead singer of Kid Abelha). Bora-Bora is the first of several attempts by the band to self-produce their recordings. Big Bang, released in the following year, continued in the same vein, featuring cheerful songs with a deep critical social messages like "Perplexo" and poetical/lyrical ones like "Lanterna dos Afogados".

In 1988 Brazilian filmmaker Sandra Kogut directed a documentary honoring the group by sharing interviews with the musicians and their fans, and scenes of live shows at Ibirapuera Stadium in São Paulo and at Montreux, Switzerland.

In 1990, the Paralamas released their first compilation, Arquivo, which featured a new version of "Vital e Sua Moto", titled "Vital 1990", and an unreleased song, "Caleidoscópio" (originally recorded by Dulce Quental of the all-female band Sempre Livre), that got massive radio play.

=== Success in Argentina only ===
The band would dedicate the first half of the 1990s to experimentation. The sixth studio album, Os Grãos, was released in 1991. It contained keyboard-driven songs of minor popular appeal, achieving a low sales record for the band, although it featured two successful tracks: "Trac-Trac", a Portuguese version of a Fito Páez song, and "Tendo a Lua". Its failure, however, can also be attributed to the deep economic crisis Brazil went through during the Fernando Collor administration.

After a small break, in which Vianna released his first solo album, the trio returned to live performances, which were sold out although the band was under heavy criticism from the press. In late 1993, Herbert, Bi and Barone spent three months in London, where they recorded Severino, produced by Phil Manzanera. Released in 1994, the album featured Brian May in the song "El Vampiro Bajo El Sol". It was even more experimental than the band's last release, with overly elaborate arrangements, and was completely ignored by radio stations and the general public, selling only 55,000 copies—an all-time low for Paralamas.

As they were being forgotten in their native Brazil, they were also gaining huge popularity in Argentina. In 1992, their compilation Paralamas, which was released in Hispanic American countries, and featured Spanish language versions of their hits, was a huge hit in neighboring countries. They were in high demand for live performances, due to the great success of Dos Margaritas, their subsequent album released in the Hispanic market (a Spanish version of Severino).

=== Back to the hit parades ===
Despite low sales for the album, Severino's tour was a huge success among the public. A series of three performances, recorded in late 1994, was released the next year as the band's second live album, Vamo Batê Lata. It was accompanied by an EP featuring four unreleased tracks: "Uma Brasileira" (a collaboration of Herbert with Djavan), "Saber Amar", "Esta Tarde", and the controversial "Luís Inácio (300 Picaretas)", which drew the spotlight back to the band after it was banished from the Federal District. The song was in reference to a statement made by former Brazilian president, Luiz Inácio Lula da Silva, at the time a Federal Deputy, that the National Congress was formed by some honored men and 300 quacks. The return to easily understandable songs and the pop genre helped the band's comeback to commercial and critical acclaim. This resulted in the best-selling album of their career, with almost a million copies sold.

Around the same time, the band invested in overtly produced music videos, for which they won eleven MTV Video Music Brasil Awards between 1995 and 1999. Their first two awards were in 1995 for the video for "Uma Brasileira", winning the Best Pop Video and Viewer's Choice Award.

From then on, the Paralamas produced a string of hits, including: "Lourinha Bombril", "Busca Vida", "Ela Disse Adeus", and "O Amor não Sabe Esperar" (a collaboration with Marisa Monte and Dado Villa-Lobos) on their next two studio albums, 1996's Nove Luas and 1998's Hey Na Na. Nove Luas sold 250,000 copies in one month, while Hey Na Na sold the equivalent in just one week.

In 1999, MTV Brasil invited the band to record the album MTV Unplugged. Instead of playing their biggest hits, they opted instead for a repertoire dominated by lesser-known songs like, "Bora Bora", "Vai Valer", and "Trem da Juventude". The Paralamas also paid homage to Chico Science and Legião Urbana. Two new songs were also featured: "Sincero Breu", and "Um Amor Um Lugar", originally recorded by Fernanda Abreu. The live album sold more than 500,000 copies, won the Latin Grammy Award for Best Brazilian Rock Album, and resulted in a sold-out world tour.

The Unplugged tour was extended until the end of 2000, when the trio released their second compilation, Arquivo II. It featured songs from all the band's albums (except Severino), a re-recording of "Mensagem de Amor" and the new track "Aonde Quer que Eu Vá", the creation of a partnership between Herbert Vianna and Paulo Sérgio Valle. The album also included two major hit tracks by Ivete Sangalo.

Afterwards, Paralamas announced a six-month vacation and a reformulation in the sound of the group after nearly two decades of collaboration. The plans pointed to a new rock album.

=== An accident, but not the end ===
On February 4, 2001, tragedy struck the band. A plane carrying Herbert and his wife, Lucy Needham Vianna, crashed en route to Dado Villa-Lobos's house in Angra dos Reis, Rio de Janeiro. Lucy died instantly in the crash and left Herbert in a coma. The crash became front-page news and the entire country followed Herbert’s fight for survival in the hospital Copa D’Or, in Copacabana, Rio de Janeiro.

Herbert eventually woke up from his coma, but was left in a wheelchair and battled long-term difficulties with speaking and playing after the accident. After many years of therapy, Herbert has made significant strides in his recovery, despite the permanent damage done to his brain. Even during this difficult period, his musical talent was not incapacitated and, in October 2002, he began rehearsing with the band again in his home studio. This led to the recording of a new CD titled Longo Caminho, with songs composed before the accident.

In 2005, they released Hoje and in 2009 they released Brasil Afora, which was first available for digital download and only later released on CD.

On 3 March 2015, ex-drummer Vital Dias died of cancer in Rio de Janeiro. In their official Facebook page, the band published a message by the members, stating that they were sending "our higher thoughts for his wife, children and friends in this difficult time".

In February 2016, it was announced that the band, together with singers Nando Reis, Paula Toller and Pitty, would take part of a tour promoted by the project Nivea Viva!, which takes place every year and takes artists on Brazilian tours. The series of 7 shows will pay tribute to Brazilian rock.

== Influence on Brazilian Rock ==
In 1987 and 1988, Afro-Bahian rhythms began to influence the sound of some of the major Brazilian rock bands, most notably Os Paralamas do Sucesso. This created a break with the influence of English-oriented, North American rock groups that originally inspired Brazilian bands. With this new sound, they were able to criticize foreign, mainstream music while simultaneously creating new opportunities for Brazilian rock groups and a more genuinely Brazil-oriented music. This new sound also followed in the tradition of the politically-influenced artists from the 1960s and 1970s, like Os Mutantes, Gilberto Gil, Caetano Veloso, and Raul Seixas. Movement toward a more Afro-Brazilian sound was also the result of the explosion of funk, hip-hop, and rap internationally. Os Paralamas are best remembered for their reggae-afrobrazilian-ska beats. Throughout its 30 years of existence, the band has continuously produced successful albums as well as controversial discs, like Alagados, Selvagem and Perplexo, which exposed the social and political realities of Brazil. They went even further with "Luís Inácio (300 Picaretas)", which openly criticized the Brazilian Congress. The band faced tragedy following Herbert's accident but remained cohesive and committed to Brazilian rock. In 2011, the band celebrated 25 years together by re-releasing their most influential album, Selvagem? (1986) and performing in Brazil, Argentina, Uruguay and Venezuela. In 2011, the song "O Calibre" (Longo Caminho-2002) was included in soundtrack of one of the most successful films in Brazil's history, Tropa de Elite 2 (Elite Squad: The Enemy Within). Herbert Vianna was listed in Brazil's Rolling Stone magazine as one of the most influential guitarists in the nation's musical history. Bi Ribeiro was also listed as one of the best bass players in Brazil and João Barone is frequently referred as one of Brazil's top drummers. The band celebrated their 30 years together by going on tour in 2012.

== Band members ==
=== Current members ===
- Herbert Vianna – lead vocals, guitars, keyboards (1977–present)
- Bi Ribeiro – bass guitar (1977–present)
- João Barone – drums, percussion, backing vocals (1982–present)

=== Former members ===
- Vital Dias – drums, percussion (1977–1982; died 2015)

=== Current touring members ===
- João Fera – keyboards, backing vocals (1987–present) percussion (1987-1993; 2007-present)
- Monteiro. Jr – saxophone (1989–present)
- Bidu Cordeiro – trombone (1997–present)

=== Former touring members ===
- Mattos Nascimento – trombone (1988)
- George Israel – saxophone (1987–1989)
- Senô Bezerra – trombone (1988–1997)
- Demetrio Bezerra – trumpet (1988–2002)
- Eduardo Lyra – percussion (1993–2007)

== Discography ==
=== Studio albums ===
- (1983) Cinema Mudo
- (1984) O Passo do Lui
- (1986) Selvagem?
- (1988) Bora Bora
- (1989) Big Bang
- (1991) Os Grãos
- (1994) Severino
- (1996) 9 Luas
- (1998) Hey Na Na
- (2002) Longo Caminho
- (2005) Hoje
- (2009) Brasil Afora
- (2017) Sinais do Sim

=== Live albums ===
- (1987) D
- (1995) Vamo Batê Lata
- (1999) Acústico MTV: Os Paralamas do Sucesso
- (2004) Uns Dias ao Vivo
- (2007) Rock in Rio 1985

=== Compilation albums ===
- (1990) Arquivo

== Awards ==
=== Latin Grammy Awards ===
- 2000: Best Brazilian Rock Album - Acústico MTV
- 2001: Best Music Video - "Aonde Quer Que Eu Va" (Nomination)
- 2001: Best Brazilian Song "A Lua Q Eu T Dei" (Nomination)
- 2003: Best Brazilian Rock Album - Longo Caminho
- 2003: Best Brazilian Song "Cuide Bem Do Seu Amor" (Nomination)
- 2006: Best Brazilian Rock Album - Hoje
- 2007: Legend of Latin Music
- 2011: Best Brazilian Contemporary Pop Album - Multishow Ao Vivo Paralamas Brasil Afora (Nomination)

=== Prêmio Multishow de Música Brasileira ===
- 1996: Best band
- 1999: Best instrumentalist (João Barone)
- 2003: Best band
- 2003: Best instrumentalist (João Barone)
- 2004: Tribute (Herbert Vianna)
- 2006: Best video (top 5) - "Na Pista"

=== MTV Video Music Brasil ===
- 1995: Best Pop Video - "Uma Brasileira"
- 1995: Viewer's Choice - "Uma Brasileira"
- 1996: Video of the Year - "Lourinha Bombril"
- 1996: Best Video Director - "Lourinha Bombril"
- 1996: Best Edited Video - "Lourinha Bombril"
- 1997: Video of the Year - "Busca Vida"
- 1998: Video of the Year - "Ela Disse Adeus"
- 1998: Best Video Director - "Ela Disse Adeus"
- 1998: Best Art Direction - "Ela Disse Adeus"
- 1998: Best Photography - "Ela Disse Adeus"
- 1998: Best Pop Video - "Ela Disse Adeus"
- 1999: Best Edited Video - "Depois da Queda o Coice"
- 2008: Dream Band - Bi Ribeiro (bass) and João Barone (drums)
- 2009: Best Live Performance

Awards and achievements
Preceded by no winner Cássia Eller; Charlie Brown Jr.	Latin Grammy Award for Best Brazilian Rock Album; 2000; 2003; 2006	Succeeded by Rita Lee; Skank; Lobão
