= Bi Ribeiro =

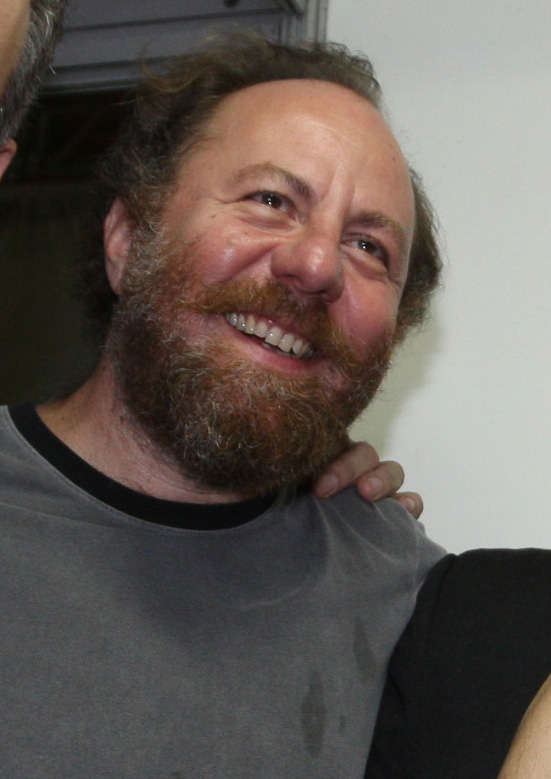
Bi Ribeiro at Garanhuns' Winter Festival.

Felipe de Nóbrega Ribeiro, better known as Bi Ribeiro (March 30, 1961 in Rio de Janeiro) is a bass player.

Since 1977, he is the bass player of the Brazilian rock band Os Paralamas do Sucesso. Ribeiro is responsible for the songwriting of many of Os Paralamas do Sucesso's songs, including "Alagados", "Melô do Marinheiro", "A Novidade" and "Perplexo".

== Guest appearances ==
- Jorge Ben Jor - Benjor (1989)
- Legião Urbana - Uma Outra Estação (1997)
- Raimundos - Só no Forévis (1999)
- Pedro Luís e a Parede - É Tudo um Real (1999)
