= João Barone =

Brazilian drummer

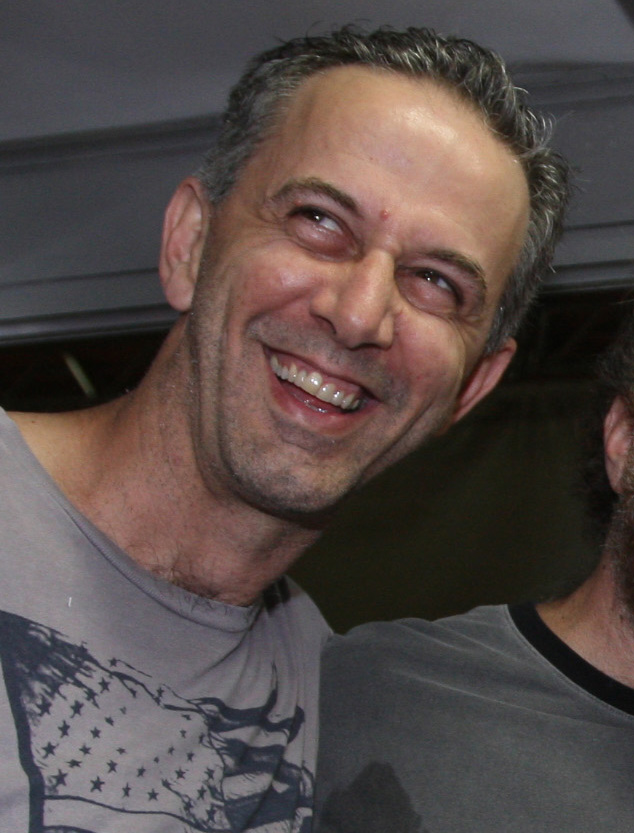
- João Barone at Garanhuns' Winter Festival.

Background information
- Born: João Alberto Barone Reis e Silva; August 4, 1962 (age 63); Rio de Janeiro, Brazil
- Occupation: Drummer
- Instrument: Drums
- Years active: 1982-present

João Alberto Barone Reis e Silva, better known as João Barone (born August 5, 1962, Rio de Janeiro), is a Brazilian drummer.

Since 1982 he is the drummer of the band Os Paralamas do Sucesso.

== Guest appearances ==
- Eduardo Dussek - Brega Chique (1984)
- Léo Jaime - Sessão da Tarde (1985)
- Léo Jaime - Vida Difícil (1986)
- Ultraje a Rigor - Sexo!! (1987)
- Ed Motta and Conexão Japeri - Ed Motta & Conexão Japeri (1988)
- Kid Abelha - Kid (1989)
- Jorge Ben Jor - Benjor (1989)
- Theo Werneck - Leite Materno (1990)
- Marina Lima - Marina Lima (1991)
- Fausto Fawcett and Laufer - Básico Instinto (1993)
- Dinho Ouro Preto - Vertigo (1994)
- Rita Lee - Rita e Roberto (1995)
- Titãs - Domingo (1995)
- Paulo Ricardo - Rock Popular Brasileiro (1996)
- Lenine - O Dia em Que Faremos Contato (1997)
- Arnaldo Antunes - Um Som (1998)
- George Israel - 4 Letras (2004)
- Zé Ramalho - Parceria dos Viajantes (2007)
