= Herbert Vianna =

Brazilian musician and producer

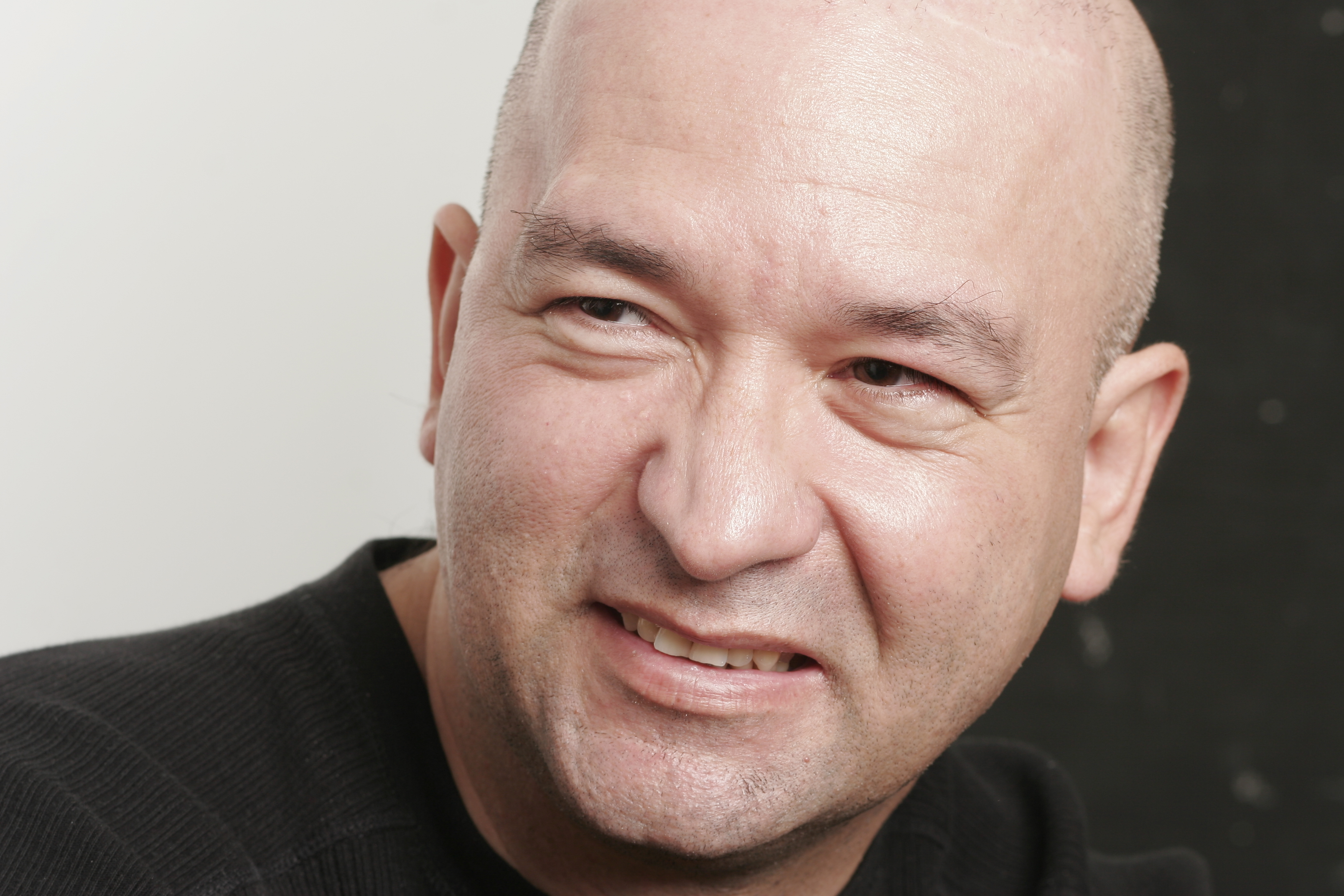
- Herbert Vianna, photo by Mauricio Valladares.

Background information
- Born: Herbert Lemos de Sousa Vianna; May 4, 1961 (age 65)
- Origin: João Pessoa, Paraíba, Brazil
- Genres: Pop, Ska
- Occupations: Singer, songwriter, guitarist, record producer
- Years active: 1977–present
- Label: EMI Music Group
- Member of: Os Paralamas do Sucesso

Herbert Lemos de Sousa Vianna (born May 4, 1961) is a Brazilian singer, songwriter, guitarist and record producer mainly known for his work with Brazilian pop rock band Os Paralamas do Sucesso.

== Early life ==
Herbert was born in João Pessoa, Paraíba. His father was from the military and, because of that, he moved to Brasília when he was still a child.

== Career ==
In Brasilia, he met band member Bi Ribeiro. When they moved to Rio de Janeiro, they formed Os Paralamas do Sucesso (some still consider them part of the "Brasília gang", along with Capital Inicial and Legião Urbana) with their friend Vital Dias playing drums. Herbert's brother is the Brazilian anthropologist and cultural researcher Hermano Vianna.

After Vital was replaced by João Barone, Herbert wrote the song "Vital e Sua Moto", to pay homage to his friend. The song became the band's first airplay hit and, shortly after that, they signed with EMI Music Group.

After spending ten years with the band, Herbert released the solo album Ê Batumarê (1992). He recorded two others, Santorini Blues (1997) e O Som do Sim (2000), with Cássia Eller, Nana Caymmi, Sandra de Sá and Marcos Valle.

=== Plane accident and aftermath ===
Herbert always liked to pilot helicopters and ultralight airplanes. On February 4, 2001, he suffered an accident in Mangaratiba, Rio de Janeiro, when the ultralight airplane he was piloting crashed into the sea, in the bay of Angra dos Reis. The accident killed his wife Lucy and put Herbert in the hospital for 44 days (part of them in a coma).

The musician became disabled (he is now in a wheelchair) and lost part of his memory after the accident; however, after a slow recovery process, he returned to perform. Since the accident, Herbert has recorded five albums with Os Paralamas do Sucesso: Longo Caminho (2002), the live Uns Dias ao Vivo (2004), Hoje (2005), Brasil Afora (2009) and Sinais do Sim (2017).

== Personal life ==
Herbert married the British journalist Lucy Needham whom he met when she came to interview him for a documentary for the BBC. They had three children together.

== Discography ==
- 1992: Ê Batumaré
- 1997: Santorini Blues
- 2000: O Som do Sim
- 2012: Victoria

== Songs written for other artists ==
- Dulce Quental: "Caleidoscópio" (later recorded by Os Paralamas do Sucesso)
- Ivete Sangalo: "Se Eu Não Te Amasse Tanto Assim", "A Lua Q Eu te Dei"
- Marina Lima: "Nada Por Mim"
- Daniela Mercury: "Milagres", "Só Pra te Mostrar" and "Sempre Te Quis" (later recorded by Os Paralamas do Sucesso)
- Ana Carolina: "Pra Terminar"
- Kid Abelha: "Seu Espião", "Por Que Não Eu?", "Educação Sentimental (Part II)"
- Paulo Ricardo: "Amor em Vão" (later recorded by Os Paralamas do Sucesso)
- Titãs: "O Caroço da Cabeça" (later recorded by Os Paralamas do Sucesso)
- Cidade Negra: "Soldado da Paz" (later recorded by Os Paralamas do Sucesso)
