= The Best of Sepultura =

Greatest hits album by Sepultura
- Released: September 12, 2006
- Recorded: 1988 – December 1995
- Genre: Groove metal; thrash metal; death metal; nu metal
- Length: 53:37
- Label: Roadrunner
- Producer: Sepultura, Scott Burns, Andy Wallace, Ross Robinson

Sepultura chronology
Dante XXI (2006)	The Best of Sepultura (2006)	A-Lex (2009)

Professional ratings
Review scores
Source	Rating
AllMusic	4.5/5 stars

The Best of Sepultura is a compilation album from Roadrunner Records, featuring a best of collection of Sepultura's music with the label. Although the track-listing after "Inner Self" is mostly a collection of the band's singles from 1991 to 1996, in its representation of the album Arise the compilation substitutes the single "Under Siege (Regnum Irae)" for the album track "Desperate Cry".

The record was released without Sepultura's involvement (they were signed to SPV Records at the time) and is not officially recognized by Sepultura themselves. The Roadrunner studio albums Morbid Visions, Against, Nation, the debut EP Bestial Devastation, and the rarities and live albums Blood-Rooted, The Roots of Sepultura and Under a Pale Grey Sky are not represented on the record (although a version of "Troops of Doom" did originally appear on Morbid Visions).

The album was released on September 12, 2006, simultaneously with similarly unsanctioned best-of collections of the bands Type O Negative, Fear Factory and Ill Niño.

== Track listing ==
No.	Title	Original release	Length
1.	"Troops of Doom"	Schizophrenia 1990 reissue	3:17
2.	"Beneath the Remains"	Beneath the Remains	5:11
3.	"Inner Self"	Beneath the Remains	5:07
4.	"Arise"	Arise	3:17
5.	"Dead Embryonic Cells"	Arise	4:52
6.	"Desperate Cry"	Arise	6:43
7.	"Refuse/Resist"	Chaos A.D.	3:19
8.	"Territory"	Chaos A.D.	4:47
9.	"Slave New World"	Chaos A.D.	2:55
10.	"Biotech is Godzilla"	Chaos A.D.	1:52
11.	"Roots Bloody Roots"	Roots	3:32
12.	"Attitude"	Roots	4:15
13.	"Ratamahatta"	Roots	4:30
Total length:			53:37

== Credits ==
=== Sepultura ===
- Max Cavalera - vocals, rhythm guitar
- Andreas Kisser - lead guitar, bass on Schizophrenia, Beneath the Remains, Arise
- Paulo Jr. - bass on Chaos A.D., Roots
- Igor Cavalera - drums, percussion
