= Sepultura discography =

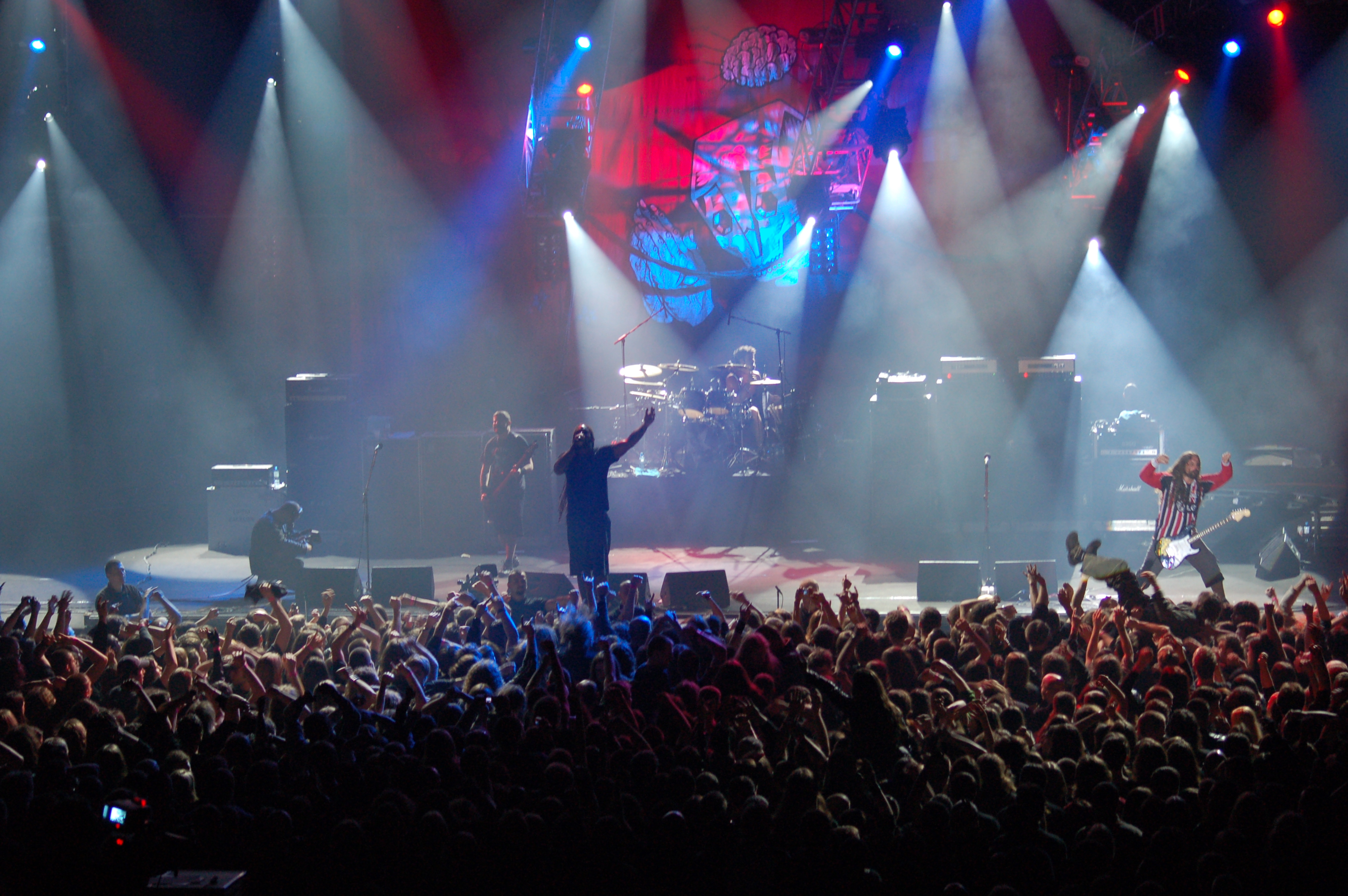
- Sepultura performing at Metalmania in 2007
- Studio albums: 15
- Extended plays: 5
- Live albums: 4
- Compilation albums: 4
- Singles: 21
- Video albums: 6
- Music videos: 21

The following is the discography of Sepultura, a Brazilian heavy metal band. Sepultura was formed in Belo Horizonte, Minas Gerais, in 1984 by brothers Max and Igor Cavalera. After several lineup changes, Paulo Jr. and Jairo Guedz became permanent members for the band's first studio album Morbid Visions, released in 1986 through Cogumelo Records. Guitarist Jairo Guedz left Sepultura following the band's first tour and was replaced by Andreas Kisser. With the new lineup, Sepultura recorded Schizophrenia in 1987. Beneath the Remains, the first album from the band's contract with Roadrunner Records, was released in 1989, followed by Arise in 1991 and Chaos A.D. in 1993. Sepultura's best-selling album Roots, was released in 1996 and debuted at number 27 on the Billboard 200.

In 1996, vocalist Max Cavalera left the band and formed Soulfly. The other members announced that they would continue under the Sepultura name and were searching for a replacement. Derrick Green was chosen to replace Cavalera, and with the new vocalist the band released Against in 1998. Nation was released in 2001, the band's last studio album with Roadrunner Records. Sepultura signed to German label SPV and released Roorback. Dante XXI was released in 2006 as a concept album inspired by the literary classic Divine Comedy by Dante Alighieri. Igor Cavalera left the band in 2006 and was replaced by Jean Dolabella. In 2009 Sepultura released A-Lex, a concept album about A Clockwork Orange, followed by 2011's Kairos. Drummer Eloy Casagrande replaced Dollabella and in 2013 the band released The Mediator Between Head and Hands Must Be the Heart, which was loosely based on sci-fi film Metropolis. In 2017, Sepultura released their fourteenth studio album Machine Messiah, and followed this in 2020 with their fifteenth studio album Quadra. In 2024, Casagrande left the band and was replaced by Greyson Nekrutman with whom the band released their final studio recording, The Cloud of Unknowing, in 2026.

== Studio albums ==
Year	Album details	Peak chart positions											Sales	Certifications
Year	Album details	AUS	AUT	FRA	GER	NLD	SWE	SWI	UK	UK Rock	US	US Ind.	Sales	Certifications
1986	Morbid Visions: Released: 10 November 1986; Label: Cogumelo	—	—	—	—	—	—	—	—	—	—	—		
1987	Schizophrenia: Released: 30 October 1987; Label: Cogumelo	—	—	—	—	—	—	—	—	—	—	—		
1989	Beneath the Remains: Released: 7 April 1989; Label: Roadrunner	—	—	—	96	—	—	—	—	—	—	—		
1991	Arise: Released: 26 March 1991; Label: Roadrunner	194	—	—	25	68	46	24	40	—	119	—		BPI: Silver
1993	Chaos A.D.: Released: 28 September 1993; Label: Roadrunner/Epic	27	19	6	11	21	11	15	11	—	32	—		ARIA: Gold; BEA: Gold; BPI: Gold; NVPI: Gold; RIAA: Gold
1996	Roots: Released: 20 February 1996; Label: Roadrunner	3	2	4	7	6	5	16	4	—	27	—		ARIA: Gold; BEA: Gold; BPI: Gold; IFPI AUT: Gold; MC: Gold; NVPI: Gold; RIAA: Gold; SNEP: Gold
1998	Against: Released: 6 October 1998; Label: Roadrunner	25	23	33	23	76	33	—	40	—	82	—	US: 129,856	
2001	Nation: Released: 20 March 2001; Label: Roadrunner	40	41	91	28	—	—	84	88	—	134	4	US: 62,065	
2003	Roorback: Released: 27 May 2003; Label: SPV/Universal Music	—	—	77	46	—	—	69	129	—	—	17	US: 4,000	
2006	Dante XXI: Released: 14 March 2006; Label: SPV	—	—	166	64	—	—	—	—	8	—	45	US: 2,300	CYP: Gold
2009	A-Lex: Released: 27 January 2009; Label: SPV	—	53	150	82	—	—	68	—	22	—	48	US: 1,600	
2011	Kairos: Released: 12 July 2011; Label: Nuclear Blast	—	75	87	49	—	—	45	—	26	—	48	US: 2,500	
2013	The Mediator Between Head and Hands Must Be the Heart: Released: 29 October 2013; Label: Nuclear Blast	—	—	153	76	—	—	96	—	22	—	50	US: 1,800	
2017	Machine Messiah: Released: 13 January 2017; Label: Nuclear Blast/Sony Music	82	33	114	27	—	—	27	165	9	—	11	US: 1,900	
2020	Quadra: Released: 7 February 2020; Label: Nuclear Blast	112	17	63	5	—	—	13	—	5	—	—	US: 3,250	
"—" denotes releases that did not chart or were not released in that country.

== Live albums ==
Year	Album details	Peak positions		
Year	Album details	AUS	FRA	SWI
2002	Under a Pale Grey Sky: Released: 22 September 2002; Label: Roadrunner	98	52	99
2005	Live in São Paulo: Released: 8 November 2005; Label: SPV	—	—	—
2014	Metal Veins – Alive in Rock in Rio: Released: 20 September 2014; Label: Eagle Vision	—	—	—
2021	SepulQuarta: Released: 13 August 2021; Label: Nuclear Blast	—	—	22
"—" denotes a release that did not chart.

== Compilation albums ==
Year	Album details	Peak positions	
Year	Album details	AUS	US
1996	The Roots of Sepultura: Released: 29 November 1996; Label: Roadrunner	42	—
1997	Blood-Rooted: Released: 3 June 1997; Label: Roadrunner	116	162
1997	B-Sides: Released: 1997; Label: Roadrunner	—	—
2006	The Best of Sepultura: Released: 12 September 2006; Label: Roadrunner	152	—
"—" denotes a release that did not chart.

== Extended plays ==
Year	Album details
1985	Bestial Devastation: Released: 1 December 1985; Label: Cogumelo
1992	Third World Posse: Released: 1992, exclusively in Australia and peaked at number #116; Label: Roadrunner Records
1996	Natural Born Blasters: Released: 1996; Label: Roadrunner Records
2002	Revolusongs: Released: 22 November 2002; Label: SPV/Universal Music
2026	The Cloud of Unknowing: Released: 24 April 2026; Label: Nuclear Blast

== LP ==
Year	Album details
2015	Sepultura Under My Skin: Released: 5 June 2015; Label: Nuclear Blast

== Singles ==
Year	Single	Peak chart positions										Album
Year	Single	AUS	FIN	FRA	GER	IRL	NLD	NOR	NZL	SWE	UK	Album
1991	"Arise"	—	—	—	—	—	—	—	—	—	—	Arise
1991	"Under Siege (Regnum Irae)"	—	9	—	—	—	—	—	—	—	91	Arise
1991	"Dead Embryonic Cells"	—	—	—	—	—	—	—	—	—	—	Arise
1993	"Refuse/Resist"	195	10	—	—	29	—	—	—	—	51	Chaos A.D.
1994	"Territory"	143	3	—	—	8	—	—	50	—	66	Chaos A.D.
1994	"Slave New World"	101	9	—	—	—	—	—	—	32	46	Chaos A.D.
1996	"Roots Bloody Roots"	44	2	26	42	27	35	20	—	14	19	Roots
1996	"Ratamahatta"	115	—	—	—	—	—	—	—	—	23	Roots
1996	"Attitude"	—	16	—	—	—	—	—	—	—	46	Roots
1998	"Choke"	160	—	—	—	—	—	—	—	—	91	Against
1999	"Against"	—	—	—	—	—	—	—	—	—	—	Against
1999	"Tribus"	82	—	—	—	—	—	—	—	—	—	Against
2006	"Convicted in Life"	—	—	—	—	—	—	—	—	—	—	Dante XXI
2011	"Kairos"	—	—	—	—	—	—	—	—	—	—	Kairos
2013	"The Age of the Atheist"	—	—	—	—	—	—	—	—	—	—	The Mediator Between Head and Hands Must Be the Heart
2015	"Sepultura Under My Skin"	—	—	—	—	—	—	—	—	—	—	Sepultura Under My Skin
2016	"I Am the Enemy"	—	—	—	—	—	—	—	—	—	—	Machine Messiah
2016	"Phantom Self"	—	—	—	—	—	—	—	—	—	—	Machine Messiah
2019	"Isolation"	—	—	—	—	—	—	—	—	—	—	Quadra
2019	"Last Time"	—	—	—	—	—	—	—	—	—	—	Quadra
2020	"Means to an End"	—	—	—	—	—	—	—	—	—	—	Quadra
2020	"Guardians of Earth"	—	—	—	—	—	—	—	—	—	—	Quadra
"—" denotes releases that did not chart or were not released in that country.

== Video albums ==
Year	Video details	US chart peak
1992	Under Siege (Live in Barcelona): Released: 14 January 1992; Label: Roadrunner	13
1995	Third World Chaos: Released: 27 June 1995; Label: Roadrunner	6
1997	We Are What We Are: Released: 28 January 1997; Label: Roadrunner	19
2002	Chaos DVD: Released: 7 October 2002; Label: Roadrunner	38
2005	Live in São Paulo: Released: 8 November 2005; Label: SPV	—
2014	Metal Veins – Alive in Rock in Rio: Released: 20 September 2014; Label: Eagle Vision	—

1.Billboard Top Music Video Charts.

== Music videos ==
Year	Title	Album	Director
1989	"Inner Self"	Beneath the Remains	Aurelio Diaz
1991	"Dead Embryonic Cells"	Arise	Bill Henderson
1992	"Arise"	Arise	Bill Henderson
1993	"Refuse/Resist"	Chaos A.D.	Peter Christopherson
1993	"Territory"	Chaos A.D.	Paul Rachman
1994	"Slave New World"	Chaos A.D.	Thomas Mignone
1996	"Roots Bloody Roots"	Roots	Thomas Mignone
1996	"Ratamahatta"	Roots	Fred Stuhr
1996	"Attitude"	Roots	Block
1998	"Choke"	Against	Raul Machado
2003	"Bullet the Blue Sky"	Revolusongs	Ricardo Della Rosa
2004	"Mind War"	Roorback	Ricardo Della Rosa
2005	"Refuse/Resist" (live)	Live in São Paulo	Lecuck Ishida
2006	"Convicted in Life"	Dante XXI	Luis Carone
2008	"Ostia"	Dante XXI	Geraldo Moraes
2009	"We've Lost You"	A-Lex	André Moraes
2009	"What I Do!"	A-Lex	Sepultura
2013	"The Vatican"	The Mediator Between Head and Hands Must Be the Heart	Rafael Kent
2014	"Da Lama ao Caos"	The Mediator Between Head and Hands Must Be the Heart	Rafael Kent
2016	"Phantom Self"	Machine Messiah	Mauricio Eça
2019	"Isolation"	Quadra	
2020	"Means to an End"	Quadra	Otavio Juliano and Luciana Ferraz
2020	"Guardians of Earth"	Quadra	Raul Machado
