= Under a Pale Grey Sky =

Live album by Sepultura
- Released: September 24, 2002
- Recorded: December 16, 1996
- Genre: Groove metal; thrash metal; death metal; nu metal
- Length: 1:48:09
- Label: Roadrunner
- Producer: Tony Wilson; Sepultura

Sepultura chronology
Nation (2001)	Under a Pale Grey Sky (2002)	Revolusongs (2002)

Professional ratings
Review scores
Source	Rating
AllMusic	link

Under a Pale Grey Sky is a live album by Sepultura, released on September 24, 2002, through Roadrunner Records. The album was recorded in the Brixton Academy, London on December 16, 1996. Max Cavalera left Sepultura shortly after the concert, following an argument with his bandmates outside the band's touring bus.

The two other bands performing on that same night were Strife and Floodgate.

The album was released by Roadrunner Records after dropping Sepultura from the label. The set list for the show sees the band play the majority of that year's Roots album, as well as the most popular songs from their previous albums. The title of the album is a direct reference to the chorus of the song "Arise" from their fourth album of the same name.

== Track listing ==
All tracks are written by Sepultura, except where noted.

Disc one
No.	Title	Writer(s)	Length
1.	"Itsári (Intro)"		1:27
2.	"Roots Bloody Roots"		3:37
3.	"Spit"		2:27
4.	"Territory"		4:59
5.	"Monólogo ao Pé do Ouvido" (Chico Science cover)	Chico Science	1:21
6.	"Breed Apart"		4:01
7.	"Attitude"		5:54
8.	"Cut-Throat"		2:53
9.	"Troops of Doom"		2:46
10.	"Beneath the Remains/Mass Hypnosis"		4:00
11.	"Born Stubborn"		4:15
12.	"Desperate Cry"		2:21
13.	"Necromancer"		3:15
14.	"Dusted"		3:59
15.	"Endangered Species"		8:27

Disc two
No.	Title	Writer(s)	Length
1.	"We Who Are Not as Others"		3:57
2.	"Straighthate"		5:10
3.	"Dictatorshit"		1:35
4.	"Refuse/Resist"		3:52
5.	"Arise/Dead Embryonic Cells"		3:09
6.	"Slave New World"	Sepultura; Evan Seinfeld	2:42
7.	"Biotech Is Godzilla"	Sepultura; Jello Biafra	2:43
8.	"Inner Self"		4:36
9.	"Polícia" (Titãs cover)	Tony Bellotto	2:35
10.	"We Gotta Know" (Cro-Mags cover)	Harley Flanagan; John Joseph; Parris Mayhew	3:52
11.	"Kaiowas"		6:12
12.	"Ratamahatta"	Sepultura; Carlinhos Brown	5:24
13.	"Orgasmatron" (Motörhead cover)	Lemmy Kilmister; Michael Burston; Phil Campbell; Pete Gill	6:38

Notes

- "Cut-Throat" contains a replay of "Cornucopia", written by John Osbourne, Tony Iommi, Terence Butler, and William Ward.
- "Polícia", contains a replay of "Gene Machine/Don't Bother Me", written by Gary Miller, Darryl Jenifer, and Paul Hudson.

== Credits ==
Sepultura

- Max Cavalera – lead vocals, rhythm guitar
- Andreas Kisser – lead guitar, backing vocals
- Paulo Jr. – bass
- Igor Cavalera – drums, percussion

Additional personnel

- Rick Rodney – vocals (on "We Gotta Know")
- Colin Richardson – mixing

== Charts ==
Chart (2002)	Peak position
Australian Albums (ARIA)	98
French Albums (SNEP)	52
Swiss Albums (Schweizer Hitparade)	99
