= Ratamahatta =

Single by Sepultura

from the album Roots
- Released: October 1996
- Recorded: October–December 1995 at Indigo Ranch in Malibu, California, U.S.
- Genre: Groove metal; nu metal; latin metal
- Length: 4:30 (album version); 3:14 (single version)
- Label: Roadrunner
- Songwriters: Max Cavalera; Igor Cavalera; Andreas Kisser; Paulo Jr.; Carlinhos Brown
- Producer: Ross Robinson

Sepultura singles chronology
| "Attitude" (1996) | "Ratamahatta" (1996) | "Choke" (1998) |

"Ratamahatta" is a song by Brazilian metal band Sepultura. It was the third and final single from the band's 1996 album Roots, and also the last Sepultura single to feature founding frontman Max Cavalera. The song is amongst the band's best-known and remains a concert staple to this day. A music video was created for the song using stop-motion animation which explores the themes of the song. This video can be found on the VHS Sepultura: We Are What We Are, which was later released on DVD as part of Chaos DVD.

The song features guest appearances from Carlinhos Brown on vocals and then Korn drummer David Silveria on percussion. It is amongst Sepultura's most percussive and tribal songs.

The song also appears in live form on the band's live release Under a Pale Grey Sky.

== Artwork ==
The artwork is a painting which reflects the video. Featured primarily on the sleeve is Zé do Caixão.

== Releases ==
The single was released on two CDs and 7" vinyl. The first CD was presented in a card foldout digipak case, while the second was in a standard slimline jewel case. Early copies of the digipak version were embossed with a stamp of the band's thorned "S" logo. The vinyl was a strictly limited edition.

== Track listing ==
CD1 (Digipak)

1. "Ratamahatta" (edit)
2. "War" (Bob Marley cover)
3. "Slave New World" (live)
4. "Amen/Inner Self" (live)

CD2

1. "Ratamahatta" (edit)
2. "War" (Bob Marley cover)
3. "Dusted" (demo version)
4. "Roots Bloody Roots" (demo version)

7" vinyl

1. "Ratamahatta"
2. "Mass Hypnosis" (live) (from Under Siege (Live in Barcelona))
- Note that all of these B-sides except for "Mass Hypnosis" (live) and "Amen/Inner Self" (live) would be collected on Blood-Rooted.
- "Slave New World" (live) and "Amen/Inner Self" (live) were recorded live in Minneapolis in March 1994.

== Cover versions ==
- Soulfly covered the song live. A recording of this can be found on the DVD The Song Remains Insane.
- Santa Catarina-based alternative metal band Panaceia covered the song in 2025, featuring singer Rogério Skylab and Korzus vocalist Marcello Pompeu.

== In popular culture ==
Brazilian fighter Thiago Silva used this as his entrance song at UFC 102, UFC 108 and UFC 125.

== Personnel ==
- Max Cavalera – lead vocals, rhythm guitar
- Andreas Kisser – lead guitar
- Paulo Jr. – bass
- Igor Cavalera – drums

Additional personnel

- Carlinhos Brown – backing vocals
- David Silveria – percussion
- Produced by Ross Robinson and Sepultura
- Recorded and engineered by Ross Robinson
- Mixed by Andy Wallace
- Assistant engineer: Richard Kaplan
