= Refuse/Resist =

1994 song by Sepultura

Single by Sepultura

from the album Chaos A.D.
- Released: 1993
- Recorded: 1992
- Studio: Rockfield Studios and Chepstow Castle, Wales
- Genre: Groove metal; thrash metal
- Length: 3:20
- Label: Roadrunner
- Lyricist: Max Cavalera
- Producer: Andy Wallace

Sepultura singles chronology
"Under Siege (Regnum Irae)" (1991)	"Refuse/Resist" (1993)	"Territory" (1993)

"Refuse/Resist" is Sepultura's fourth single, released in 1993. The title song, also included as a single off the album Chaos A.D., is one of the band's best-known songs and remains a concert staple to this day. A music video was filmed for the single which features the band playing live at a festival intercut with footage of rioting and general unrest. This video can be found on the VHS Third World Chaos, which was later released on DVD as part of the Chaos DVD. The intro to the song is the heartbeat of Max Cavalera's then-unborn first son Zyon. This song is also notable for having a 20-second growl at the end.

"Refuse/Resist" also appears in live form on the band's live releases Under a Pale Grey Sky and Live in São Paulo.

== Background ==
Max Cavalera claims to have been inspired for the song by seeing the phrase "Protest and survive/Refuse and resist" on a man's leather jacket on the New York subway.

== Artwork ==
The cover of the single depicts a Korean man jumping at a police barricade holding a petrol bomb, while the interior features the famous image of the anonymous Chinese man who stood in front of several tanks in Tiananmen Square, Beijing China, blocking their path. The reverse of the sleeve shows the band playing live. The spine of the CD release does not feature the band name or the name of the single, but rather is blank purple.

== Releases ==
The single was released in several forms. Two CD versions exist: one 3-track maxi-single and a seven-track EP, details of which are listed below. Both come in foldout card digipak cases. Early limited pressings were embossed with the Sepultura thorned 'S' logo. In addition, the single was also released on cassette tape with the same B-sides as the maxi single. The single also saw two vinyl releases, both limited editions. The 7" version was pressed on 7" vinyl with "Inhuman Nature" as the B-side, while the 12" version was pressed on black vinyl but had a die-cut sleeve which was made to look like it had been riddled with bullet holes.

== Accolades ==
It charted at number 26 in VH1's 40 Greatest Metal Songs.

== Track listing ==
No.	Title	Length
1.	"Refuse/Resist" (from the album Chaos A.D.)
2.	"Crucificados pelo sistema" (cover of a Ratos de Porão song)
3.	"Inhuman Nature" (cover of a Final Conflict song: also appears on the compilation Blood-Rooted)
4.	"Drug Me" (cover of a Dead Kennedys song: also appears on the compilations Virus 100, Blood Rooted as well as The Roots of Sepultura)
5.	"Dead Embryonic Cells" (Live version taken from Under Siege (Live In Barcelona)*)
6.	"Desperate Cry" (Live version taken from Under Siege (Live In Barcelona)*)
7.	"Orgasmatron" (Motörhead cover, live version taken from Under Siege (Live In Barcelona)*)

- * denotes tracks which were only available on the scarce EP version.

== Personnel ==
- Max Cavalera – vocals, rhythm guitar
- Andreas Kisser – lead guitar
- Paulo Jr. – bass
- Igor Cavalera – drums, percussion
- Sepultura – production
- Andy Wallace – mixing, recording, engineering, production
- Simon Dawson – assistant engineering

== Cover versions ==
- Apocalyptica covered the song on their album Inquisition Symphony.
- Soulfly plays the song live. A recording of this can be found on the DVD, The Song Remains Insane. "Refuse/Resist" was recorded in the Soulfly studio and released as a bonus track in their seventh album, Omen.
- Pro-Pain covered the song on their tribute album Run for Cover.
- Andre Luders and Nordmacht.
- Krisiun covered the song for their album Southern Storm.
- Deep Coma covered the song for their album Despair As You Stare.
- Hatebreed covered the song for their cover album For the Lions. The cover also appears on the soundtrack for the movie Marvel's Punisher: War Zone.
- Cataract covered the song for their homonym album Cataract.
- Roadrunner United covered it on their live DVD*.
- French nu metal band Mass Hysteria covered the song in their 1998 album Live à Montréal (in French).
- Hank Williams III's punk/thrash/metal band Assjack covers "Refuse/Resist" as part of a medley with Slayer's "Raining Blood", "Postmortem", and "Jesus Saves" during some live performances.
- Local South Florida thrash metal band Edge of Anger has made their cover of "Refuse/Resist" a staple in their live shows.
- American thrash metal band Anthrax frequently cover the song while live on tour for their 2011 album, Worship Music.
- British black metal band The Meads of Asphodel covered the song for their 2004 live studio album The Mill Hill Sessions.
- Belgian metal band Fleddy Melculy covered the music, but used their own lyrics titled "De bus gemist".
