= Attitude (Sepultura song) =

1996 single by Sepultura

Single by Sepultura

from the album Roots
- B-side: "Kaiowas" (Tribal Jam); "Clenched Fist" (live); "Biotech Is Godzilla" (live); "Lookaway" (Master Vibe mix); "Mine"
- Released: June 1996
- Recorded: October – December 1995 at; Indigo Ranch, in Malibu, California
- Genre: Groove metal; alternative metal; nu metal
- Length: 4:15
- Label: Roadrunner
- Songwriters: Max Cavalera; Igor Cavalera; Andreas Kisser; Paulo Jr.
- Producer: Ross Robinson

Sepultura singles chronology
"Roots Bloody Roots" (1996)	"Attitude" (1996)	"Ratamahatta" (1996)

"Attitude" is a song by Brazilian heavy metal band Sepultura. It is the second single from their 1996 album Roots. The song remains a concert staple to this day. A music video was filmed for the single which features the band performing beside a mixed martial arts cage, in which various people (including businessmen and tribesmen) are fighting whilst being filmed. The Gracie family and Danny Trejo also appear in the video. At the end of the video, the crowd goes crazy and destroys the cage (which is similar to the end of Nirvana's "Smells Like Teen Spirit" music video) and Max Cavalera destroys his guitar. At the very end, the band and the Gracie family are seen taking photos. This video can be found on the VHS We Are What We Are, which was later released on DVD as part of Chaos DVD.

The song's lyrics were written by Max Cavalera's stepson Dana Wells, who also came up with the idea for the video. Dana was killed in an automobile accident not too long after the album was released, which was one of the catalysts for Max leaving the band and starting Soulfly, who perform a different version of "Attitude" named "The Song Remains Insane", although using the same set of lyrics. This refrain in particular also crops up again in the song "The Doom of All Fires" on Cavalera Conspiracy's debut album Inflikted.

The song also appears in live form on the band's live releases Under a Pale Grey Sky and Live in São Paulo.

== Artwork ==
The cover of the single shows various people's Sepultura tattoos, which are shown to be on wrists, ankles and even foreheads. The reverse of the EP shows Dana Wells mid-stage-dive, and features a short eulogy from Max and Ozzy Osbourne. The concept for the tattoo cover was also developed by Dana.

== Releases ==
The single was released on two CDs and 7" vinyl. The first CD was presented in a card foldout digipak case, while the second was in a standard slimline jewel case. Early copies of the digipak version were embossed with a stamp of the band's thorned 'S' logo. The vinyl was a strictly limited edition.

== Track listing ==
CD1 (Digipak)

1. "Attitude"
2. "Kaiowas" (Tribal Jam) (new version of the song originally found on Chaos A.D.)
3. "Clenched Fist" (live)
4. "Biotech Is Godzilla" (live)

CD2

1. "Attitude"
2. "Lookaway" (Master Vibe mix) (remix of the song originally found on Roots)
3. "Mine" (featuring Mike Patton)

7" red vinyl

1. "Attitude"
2. "Dead Embryonic Cells" (live) (from Under Siege (Live in Barcelona))
- Note that all of these B-sides except for "Dead Embryonic Cells" (live) and "Kaiowas" (Tribal Jam) would be collected on Blood-Rooted.

== Cover versions ==
- Soulfly covers the song live. A recording of this can be found on the DVD, The Song Remains Insane.

== Personnel ==
- Max Cavalera – vocals, rhythm guitar, berimbau on "Attitude"
- Andreas Kisser – lead guitar
- Paulo Jr. – bass
- Igor Cavalera – drums, percussion

Technical personnel

- Sepultura – production
- Ross Robinson – production, recording, engineering
- Andy Wallace – mixing
- Richard Kaplan – assistant engineering
