= Raza de Odio =

Raza de Odio was an Italian metal band from Genoa.

The band was formed in 2002 by Italian extreme metal guitarist Marco "Peso" Pesenti, among others of the band Necrodeath, and Spanish guitar player Paco. They would play extreme metal with flamenco influences. Moreover, the band would write English and Spanish lyrics.

Peso was followed by members he had played with in Necrodeath and Sadist; vocalist Zanna and bassist Davide Queirolo ("John" in Necrodeath, "El Sargento" in Raza de Odio). Christian "Christo Machete" Parisi belonged to Genoa's power metal scene, and the band was completed by his brother "López" on lead guitar.

Raza de Odio's only album La nueva alarma was released by Scarlet Records in 2004, and mixed thrash and death metal with the Spanish influences. The reception was mediocre to negative. Metal.de only scored the album 5 out of 10. The reviewer stated that "the idiosyncratic mix of Sepultura in the Chaos A.D./Roots era, NYHC à la Biohazard, and classic flamenco guitars doesn't really ignite". The folk-type guitars and the bongo drums "rarely come to the fore", with the music being dominated by "simple" thrash metal riffs. Listening to the album once was fine, but "anyone who enjoys listening to an album several times should steer clear of this one".

Danish site Heavymetal.dk also stopped on 5 of 10. There were some good riffs, but the "tribal thrash" did not measure up to the apparent inspirations Sepultura and Soulfly. The reviewer felt the band could do without "the Latin tripe" and instead "produce a solid round of thrash". Norway's Scream gave La nueva alarma 2 out of 6, dismissing most aspects of it: "This debut album is about as funny as an empty whisky bottle. The tunes are sluggish and slow". Sound-wise, La nueva alarma reminded the reviewer of "a Norwegian thrash metal demo from the late 80s", meaning a garage and amateur production. Another Norwegian magazine gave a dice throw of 4, citing that the thrash/Latin mix was "incredibly catchy in certain passages", giving the reviewer "positive vibrations".
