= Choke (Sepultura song) =

Single by Sepultura

from the album Against
- B-side: "Gene Machine/Don't Bother Me" (Bad Brains cover)
- Released: November 28, 1998
- Recorded: List: ION Studios, São Paulo, Brazil; House of Blues Studios, Encino, California; The Hook Studios, North Hollywood; Sparky Dark Studios, Calabasas, California; Image Studios, Los Angeles, California; Chophouse Studio, Walnut Creek, California; Golden Track Studios, San Diego, California; KODO Village, Sado Island, Japan
- Genre: Groove metal
- Length: 4:15
- Label: Roadrunner
- Songwriters: Derrick Green; Igor Cavalera; Andreas Kisser; Paulo Jr.
- Producers: Howard Benson; Sepultura

Sepultura singles chronology
"Ratamahatta" (1996)	"Choke" (1998)	"Against" (1998)

"Choke" is Sepultura's tenth official single, and the first of three from the album Against, released in 1998. This is the band's first single with Derrick Green on vocals. It is still played in concerts. The video for the single was filmed at Green's first concert with the band, and can be found on the DVD Live in São Paulo. The cover artwork simply shows the four member of the band during the same performance.

== Overview ==
It was the band's last single to chart in the United Kingdom, peaking at number 91. It was released as both a CD and 12" picture disc.

A multitude of people were known to have demoed vocals for "Choke" including Marc Grewe of Morgoth, Phil Demmel of Machine Head and Vio-Lence, Jason "Gong" Jones of Drowning Pool, Jorge Rosado of Merauder and Chuck Billy of Testament.

== Track listing ==
CD

1. "Choke"
2. "Gene Machine/Don't Bother Me" (Bad Brains cover)
3. "Against" (demo version)

12" vinyl

1. "Choke"
2. "Gene Machine/Don't Bother Me" (Bad Brains cover)
3. "Against" (demo version)

== Personnel ==
- Derrick Green – vocals, rhythm guitar
- Andreas Kisser – lead guitar
- Paulo Jr. – bass
- Igor Cavalera – drums, percussion

Technical personnel

- Sepultura – production
- Howard Benson – production, mixing
- Carlo Bartolini – recording, engineering
- Tim Palmer – mixing
- Bobbie Brooks – mixing
- James Saez – assistant mixing
- Mark Moncrief – assistant mixing
- David Bryant – assistant engineering
- Daniel Mantovani – assistant engineering
- Tosh Kasai – assistant engineering
- James Bennett – assistant engineering
- Tape Op by Skye A.K. Correa
