= Slave New World =

Single by Sepultura

from the album Chaos A.D.
- B-side: "Desperate Cry" (live); "Orgasmatron" (live); "Drug Me"; "Crucificados Pela Sistema"
- Released: 1994
- Recorded: 1992; Rockfield Studios and; Chepstow Castle, South Wales, United Kingdom
- Genre: Groove metal
- Length: 2:54
- Label: Roadrunner
- Songwriter(s): Max Cavalera; Igor Cavalera; Andreas Kisser; Paulo Jr.; Evan Seinfeld
- Producer(s): Andy Wallace

Sepultura singles chronology
"Territory" (1993)	"Slave New World" (1994)	"Roots Bloody Roots" (1996)

"Slave New World" is Sepultura's sixth official single, and the final of three to be taken from the album Chaos A.D., released in 1994. The lyrics were co-written by Evan Seinfeld from Sepultura's Roadrunner label-mates Biohazard. Like most of the band's singles, the song is one of the band's best-known songs and remains a concert staple to this day. A music video was filmed for the single which features the band playing on what appears to be a volcano, intercut with footage of severe human conditioning, including branding people with barcodes. This video can be found on the VHS Third World Chaos, which was later released on DVD as part of Chaos DVD. The title of the song is a wordplay of Aldous Huxley's 1932 dystopian novel Brave New World.

The song also appears in live form on the band's releases Under a Pale Grey Sky and Live in São Paulo. It also appeared as a live B-side to the "Ratamahatta" single. This same recording was later included on the Blood-Rooted compilation.

== Artwork ==
The artwork for the single shows a grey clenched fist, the wrist branded with a barcode. The reverse also depicts a barcode, rippled to look like a flag. The single artwork stays with the imagery of the music video.

== Releases ==
The single was released in several forms. There exist 2 CD versions: one three-track maxi-single and a two-track single, the track details of which are listed below. The maxi-single was released in a foldout card digipak case which had two disc trays: one for the CD which came with it, and another to insert the second single into. The second single came in a card slip with the same artwork as the normal CD, but was more reminiscent of a promotional CD. The vinyl version of the single was a single sided etched 10" limited edition orange 45 RPM record, which came in a transparent sleeve so it could be seen.

== Track listing ==
The band's official discography gives the incorrect track listing for this single.

CD1:

1. "Slave New World" (from the album Chaos A.D.)*
2. "Crucificados Pelo Sistema" (Ratos de Porao cover)
3. "Drug Me" (Dead Kennedys cover)
4. "Orgasmatron" (Motörhead cover, live version taken from the Under Siege (Live in Barcelona) video)

CD2:

1. "Slave New World" (from the album Chaos A.D.)*
2. "Desperate Cry" (live version taken from the Under Siege (Live in Barcelona) video)
- "Slave New World" is the only song to appear on both versions of the single.
- Many of these B-sides have appeared on previous singles. "Drug Me" and "Orgasmatron" (live) were used for Third World Posse. "Desperate Cry" (live) also appeared with "Orgasmatron" on Under Siege (Live in Barcelona). The only track making its first appearance is "Crucificados Pelo Sistema".

== Chart performance ==
Although the single did not chart in the US, it did peak at number 46 in the British Singles Chart.

== Personnel ==
Sepultura

- Max Cavalera – vocals, rhythm guitar
- Andreas Kisser – lead guitar
- Paulo Jr. – bass
- Igor Cavalera – drums

Technical personnel

- Sepultura – production
- Andy Wallace – production, recording, engineering, mixing
- Simon Dawson – assistant engineering

== Cover versions ==
This song was covered by the American band Trivium as a bonus track for deluxe editions of In Waves, and also by Eyes of the Dead on their EP, Lets Play Drink the Beer!!.

In April 2016, grandmother-fronted Canadian grindcore band Grindmother, released a cover version of "Slave New World" for a video and 7" single. In response, Sepultura posted it on their social media feeds, calling their version "inspiring".
