= Tribus =

Tribus was the name for Roman tribes (also see tribal assembly) and may also refer to:

- Tribe, a social group
- Tribus (song), an EP released by Brazilian Thrash metal band Sepultura
- Myron Tribus (1929–2016), director of the Center for Advanced Engineering Study at MIT
- Tribus (carriage), a type of cabriolet, a horse-drawn carriage
- Tribe (biology), a taxonomical rank
