= Tribus (EP) =

Single by Sepultura

from the album Against
- B-side: "The Waste"; "Common Bonds (alternate mix)"
- Released: June 1999
- Recorded: List: ION Studios, São Paulo, Brazil; House of Blues Studios, Encino, California; The Hook Studios, North Hollywood; Sparky Dark Studios, Calabasas, California; Image Studios, Los Angeles, California; Chophouse Studio, Walnut Creek, California; Golden Track Studios, San Diego, California; KODO Village, Sado Island, Japan
- Genre: Experimental metal
- Length: 1:45
- Label: Roadrunner
- Songwriter(s): Derrick Green; Igor Cavalera; Andreas Kisser; Paulo Jr.
- Producer(s): Howard Benson; Sepultura

Sepultura singles chronology
"Against" (1998)	"Tribus" (1999)

Tribus is an EP released by Brazilian band Sepultura, in 1999. It is made up of demos and remixes of songs found on the full-length album Against. The song "The Waste" is an alternate version of the song "Kamaitachi" from the album Against, featuring Mike Patton of Faith No More on vocals. "The Waste" and "Common Bonds (alternate mix)" were also features as B-sides on the "Against" single, which also has the same artwork as the "Tribus" E.P. "Prenúncio" is a recording of Zé do Caixão's introduction of the band which used to precede their live performances. Another recording of this can be found on the band's second live album, Live in São Paulo.

== Track listing ==
1. "The Waste" (with Mike Patton) – 3:39
2. "Tribus (demo)" – 1:45
3. "Common Bonds (alternate mix)" – 3:04
4. "Unconscious (demo)" – 3:42
5. "F.O.E. (extended mix)" – 3:04
6. "Prenúncio" – 5:08

== Personnel ==
- Derrick Green – lead vocals, rhythm guitar
- Igor Cavalera – drums
- Andreas Kisser – lead guitar
- Paulo Jr. – bass
- Produced by Howard Benson and Sepultura
- Recorded and engineered by Carlo Bartolini
- Mixed by Tim Palmer at Scream Studios, Studio City, California, USA
- Mixed by Howard Benson and Bobbie Brooks at The Gallery, Encino, California, USA
- Mix assisted by James Saez and Mark Moncrief
- Assistant engineered by David Bryant, Daniel Mantovani, Tosh Kasai, and James Bennett
- Tape Op by Skye A.K. Correa

== Charts ==
Chart performance for Tribus
Chart (1999)	Peak position
Australian Albums (ARIA)	82
