= Roots Bloody Roots =

Single by Sepultura

from the album Roots
- B-side: "Procreation (Of the Wicked)"; "Territory" (live); "Beneath the Remains/Escape to the Void" (live); "Symptom of the Universe"; "Propaganda" (live)
- Released: February 1996
- Recorded: October–December 1995
- Studio: Indigo Ranch in Malibu, California
- Genre: Nu metal; groove metal
- Length: 3:32
- Label: Roadrunner
- Songwriters: Max Cavalera; Igor Cavalera; Andreas Kisser; Paulo Jr.
- Producer: Ross Robinson

Sepultura singles chronology
"Slave New World" (1994)	"Roots Bloody Roots" (1996)	"Attitude" (1996)

Music video
- "Roots Bloody Roots" on YouTube

"Roots Bloody Roots" is a song by Brazilian heavy metal band Sepultura, released in February 1996 as the lead single from their sixth studio album Roots. It is the band's best-known song and remains a concert staple, usually being performed on encores. A music video was filmed for the song, which features the band performing in a catacomb and on the streets with a tribe of percussionists. This video can be found on the VHS We Are What We Are, which was later released on DVD as part of Chaos DVD.

The song also appears in live form on the band's live releases Under a Pale Grey Sky and Live in São Paulo. Another live version appears on the limited-edition digipak of the band's 2001 album Nation. Former Sepultura frontman Max Cavalera has also played the song live numerous times with his other bands Soulfly and Cavalera Conspiracy. Recordings of their version can be found on the limited edition versions of the albums Soulfly and Prophecy and as iTunes bonus track on Conquer, as well as on the DVD The Song Remains Insane, plus on the bonus DVDs of Omen and Archangel.

In 2021, Eli Enis of Revolver included the song in his list of the "15 Greatest Album-Opening Songs in Metal".

== Music video ==
The music video was directed by Thomas Mignone and won the Kerrang "Video of the Year Award" in 1996, as well as a nomination for the MTV Brazil "Best Rock Video" Award. Filming was done in the catacombs underneath the city of Salvador, where the Brazilian slaves were sold. The video is distinguished from other heavy metal imagery by its atypical use of the natural beauty of Brazil, including its traditional capoeira fight, Timbalada percussionists, and Afro-Brazilians people, as well as the reference to the religion of Candomblé. The video also shows scenes of Catholic churches.

== Releases ==
The single was released on two CDs and 7" vinyl. The first CD was presented in a card foldout digipak case, while the second was in a standard slimline jewel case. Early copies of the digipak version were embossed with a stamp of the band's thorned 'S' logo. The vinyl was a strictly limited edition and was red in colour.

== Track listing ==
Disc one (digipak)

1. "Roots Bloody Roots"
2. "Procreation (Of the Wicked)" (Celtic Frost cover)
3. "Refuse/Resist" (live)
4. "Territory" (live)

Disc two

1. "Roots Bloody Roots"
2. "Procreation (Of the Wicked)" (Celtic Frost cover)
3. "Propaganda" (live)
4. "Beneath the Remains/Escape to the Void" (live)

7" red vinyl

1. "Roots Bloody Roots"
2. "Symptom of the Universe" (Black Sabbath cover. It also appears on Blood-Rooted and the limited edition of Roots)
- Refuse/Resist, Territory, Propaganda, Beneath the Remains/Escape to the Void were recorded live in Minneapolis, Minnesota in March 1994

== Personnel ==
=== Sepultura ===
- Max Cavalera – lead vocals, rhythm guitar
- Andreas Kisser – lead guitar, backing vocals
- Paulo Jr. – bass
- Igor Cavalera – drums, percussion

=== Production ===
- Produced by Ross Robinson and Sepultura
- Recorded and engineered by Ross Robinson
- Mixed by Andy Wallace
- Assistant engineer: Richard Kaplan

== Charts ==
Chart (1996)	Peak position
Australia (ARIA)	44
Belgium (Ultratop 50 Wallonia)	31
Europe (Eurochart Hot 100)	25
Finland (Suomen virallinen lista)	2
France (SNEP)	26
Germany (GfK)	42
Ireland (IRMA)	27
Netherlands (Dutch Top 40)	38
Netherlands (Single Top 100)	35
Norway (VG-lista)	20
Scottish Singles Sales (Official Charts)	22
Sweden (Sverigetopplistan)	14
UK Singles (Official Charts)	19
UK Rock & Metal (Official Charts)	1
