= Live in São Paulo (Sepultura album) =

2005 live album by Sepultura

- DVD front cover

Live album by Sepultura
- Released: November 8, 2005
- Recorded: 3 April 2005
- Venue: Olympia, São Paulo, Brazil
- Genre: Groove metal; thrash metal; death metal
- Length: 78:18 (CD); 79:00 (DVD)
- Label: SPV
- Director: Lecuck Ishida
- Producer: Sepultura

Sepultura chronology
Roorback (2003)	Live in São Paulo (2005)	Dante XXI (2006)

Alternative cover
- CD front cover

Professional ratings
Review scores
Source	Rating
AllMusic	3.5/5 stars

Live in São Paulo is a live and video album by Brazilian heavy metal band Sepultura, released on November 8, 2005, through SPV Records. It was recorded on April 3, 2005, in São Paulo, Brazil. The performance of "Refuse/Resist" was released as the single for the album. The album and DVD are the second time that fans can hear singer Derrick Green perform Max Cavalera-era Sepultura songs on an official release. A live version of "Roots Bloody Roots" featuring Green was released as a bonus track on Nation.

== Track listing ==
Disc one
No.	Title	Length
1.	"Intro"	4:51
2.	"Apes of God"	3:11
3.	"Slave New World"	3:37
4.	"Propaganda"	3:03
5.	"Attitude"	4:48
6.	"Choke"	3:27
7.	"Inner Self" / "Beneath the Remains"	4:55
8.	"Escape to the Void"	4:29
9.	"Mindwar"	3:16
10.	"Troops of Doom"	3:39
11.	"Necromancer"	3:29

Disc two
No.	Title	Length
1.	"Sepulnation"	3:52
2.	"Refuse/Resist"	3:07
3.	"Territory"	4:30
4.	"Black Steel in the Hour of Chaos" (Public Enemy cover)	3:49
5.	"Bullet the Blue Sky" (U2 cover)	4:58
6.	"Reza"	2:08
7.	"Biotech Is Godzilla"	2:41
8.	"Arise" / "Dead Embryonic Cells"	4:28
9.	"Come Back Alive"	2:18
10.	"Roots Bloody Roots"	4:42

- In "Biotech Is Godzilla" the band plays Led Zeppelin's song "Dazed and Confused" from their 1969 album Led Zeppelin.

DVD one
No.	Title	Length
1.	"Intro"
2.	"Apes of God"
3.	"Slave New World"
4.	"Propaganda"
5.	"Attitude"
6.	"Choke""
7.	"Inner Self" / "Beneath the Remains"
8.	"Escape to the Void"
9.	"Mindwar"
10.	"Troops of Doom"
11.	"Necromancer"
12.	"Sepulnation"
13.	"Refuse/Resist"
14.	"Territory"
15.	"Black Steel in the Hour of Chaos"
16.	"Bullet the Blue Sky"
17.	"Reza"
18.	"Biotech Is Godzilla"
19.	"Arise" / "Dead Embryonic Cells"
20.	"Come Back Alive"
21.	"Roots Bloody Roots"

- "Making Of" (11 min)
- "Band Biography" (18 min)

DVD two

- A documentary about the band from 1998–2005
- "Mind War" (music video)
- "Bullet the Blue Sky" (music video)
- "Choke" (music video)
- "Nomad" (live)
- "Desperate Cry" (live)
- "Territory" (live)

== Credits ==
Sepultura

- Derrick Green – lead vocals, rhythm guitar
- Andreas Kisser – lead guitar, backing vocals
- Paulo Jr. – bass
- Igor Cavalera – drums, percussion

Other Performers

- BNegão – vocals ("Black Steel in the Hour of Chaos")
- Alex Camargo – vocals ("Necromancer")
- João Gordo – vocals ("Reza" and "Biotech is Godzilla")
- Jairo Guedz – guitar ("Troops of Doom" and "Necromancer")
- Zé Gonzáles – turntables ("Black Steel in the Hour of Chaos")
