= The Song Remains Insane (video) =

Video by Soulfly
- Released: March 1, 2005
- Genre: Nu metal, groove metal
- Length: 79 minutes
- Label: Roadrunner
- Director: Kimo Proudfoot
- Producer: Villains, Jason Cohon

The Song Remains Insane is the first video album by the American metal band Soulfly. It was released through Roadrunner Records on March 1, 2005.

== Track listing ==
All songs written and composed by Max Cavalera.

Live

1. "Prophecy" (live at the Metalmania Festival, Poland, 2004)
2. "Eye for an Eye" (live at The Palace, Los Angeles, CA, 2000)
3. "Living Sacrifice" (live at the Hultsfred Festival, Hultsfred, Sweden, 2004)
4. "Bring It" (live at the Metalmania Festival, Poland, 2004)
5. "Refuse/Resist" (live at the Hultsfred Festival, Hultsfred, Sweden, 2004)
6. "Execution Style" (live at the Hultsfred Festival, Hultsfred, Sweden, 2004)
7. "Seek 'n' Strike" (live at the Metalmania Festival, Poland, 2004)
8. "Roots Bloody Roots" (live at the Metalmania Festival, Poland, 2004)

Music videos

9. "Bleed"
10. "Back to the Primitive"
11. "Seek 'n' Strike"
12. "Prophecy"

Bonus performance clips

13. "Attitude" (live at the Dynamo Festival, Holland, 1998)
14. "First Commandment" (live at the Dynamo Festival, Holland, 1998)
15. "No Hope = No Fear" (live at The Palace, Los Angeles, CA, 2000)

Bonus audio track

16. "Blow Away" (Ruff Mix)

== Personnel ==
- Villains – producer
- Kimo Proudfoot – director
- Jason Cohon – producer
- Janet Haase – executive producer
- Chris Wright – editor
