= Chaos A.D. =

Studio album by Sepultura
- Released: October 11, 1993
- Recorded: 1992–1993
- Studio: Rockfield (Monmouth, Wales) Chepstow Castle (Monmouth, Wales)
- Genres: Groove metal, thrash metal
- Length: 47:04
- Labels: Roadrunner; Epic
- Producer: Andy Wallace

Sepultura chronology
Arise (1991)	Chaos A.D. (1993)	Roots (1996)

Singles from Chaos A.D.
- 1. "Refuse/Resist" Released: September 5, 1993; 2. "Territory" Released: September 27, 1993; 3. "Slave New World" Released: May 25, 1994

Chaos A.D. is the fifth studio album by Brazilian heavy metal band Sepultura, released on October 11, 1993 by Roadrunner Records. After the success of Arise (1991), the band decided to expand the experimentation of that album and depart further from their earlier thrash metal sound, moving towards groove metal. The album also features the band's first fully acoustic song.

Chaos A.D. is also Sepultura's only album on Epic Records, which handled its release for North American distribution. It is also the first album to feature Paulo Jr. on bass after having played with the band in a live capacity since 1984. (Note: Despite being credited as bassist on the band's first four albums, the members of Sepultura have stated in interviews that Paulo Jr. had not played on any albums prior to Chaos A.D.)

The album peaked at 32 on the Billboard 200, becoming Sepultura's highest-charting record at the time and Roadrunner's first album in the top 40. It received widespread acclaim upon release and has come to be regarded as one of Sepultura's best albums, and a landmark in heavy metal.

== Recording and production ==
The band considered numerous producers, including avant-garde jazz composer John Zorn and Al Jourgensen of industrial metal pioneers Ministry. They ultimately chose Andy Wallace, who had previously mixed Arise. Sepultura wanted isolation, and for that Andy Wallace suggested Rockfield Studios, located in South Wales. The recording sessions marked the first time Sepultura had recorded as a quartet as opposed to a trio, which saw Andreas Kisser handling both bass and guitar duties on their previous three albums; as such, Chaos A.D. was the first album to include Paulo Jr., who had been playing live with the band since joining in 1984.

"Kaiowas" was recorded live among the ruins of the medieval castle of Chepstow. It was an entirely acoustic track, with Kisser and Max Cavalera on the guitars and drummer Igor Cavalera and Paulo Jr. on percussion. When they recorded "Kaiowas", the quartet never even considered playing the track live, because they thought it would be too difficult to recreate the drumming on stage. They changed their minds after seeing a video of the American band Neurosis: "We saw in that live video that the Neurosis guys put down their guitars and everybody started to play the drums on stage", lead guitarist Andreas remembers. "We decided to try the same thing. We rehearsed it once and it was wonderful. We haven't stopped playing the song live since."

During recording sessions, Sepultura recorded several covers: "The Hunt", from New Model Army, "Polícia", from Titãs, "Inhuman Nature", from the American hardcore punk band Final Conflict, and "Crucificados pelo Sistema", from Brazilian Ratos de Porão. Igor, a New Model Army fan, convinced the other band members to include "The Hunt" on the record. Paulo joked that the money of the LP would go straight to new dentures for Justin Sullivan, the toothless singer of New Model Army. The latter 3 covers would be included as B-sides and also on the compilation Blood-Rooted. "Polícia" is also included as a bonus track on the Brazilian edition of the album. Up until the time the album was due, the title was originally Propaganda after track 6, but Max Cavalera changed it to Chaos A.D. after the Misfits' Earth A.D.

== Composition ==
Out of the boredom of playing the Arise songs for two years straight and concerned about the threat of musically stagnating, Sepultura pushed the envelope on Chaos A.D. The new material came out slower, with more emphasis on groove than speed. The first track, "Refuse/Resist", revealed the band's new direction. The song starts with the heartbeat of Max's then-unborn first son, Zyon, followed by some Afro-Brazilian drumming reminiscent of Salvador, Bahia samba-reggae group Olodum. About the track's introductory guitar riff, Max said it "could have been created by a death metal band."

According to Max Cavalera, "diversity was the key to Chaos A.D.", also saying "Biotech Is Godzilla" was "pure hardcore". "Nomad", with its characteristically slow riffs, was described by lead guitarist Andreas Kisser as their answer to Metallica's "Sad but True". The album also featured Sepultura's first all-acoustic incursion, "Kaiowas". "It's like a mixture of Led Zeppelin, Sonic Youth and Olodum", said Max of that particular song.

Chaos A.D. was their first record to use some lower guitar tunings. Half of the songs in the album are tuned down to D standard, except for "Kaiowas" and “Propaganda,” which are in drop C♯ and D♯ standard tunings, respectively. Max Cavalera said he "had to fight Andreas over" retuning the guitars to D, partly because all of Sepultura's songs, until then, were written in standard tuning. He argued that Black Sabbath also played in D, and they could do the same.

== Lyrical themes ==
After traveling extensively abroad for their Arise tour, the band came to see their home-country in a new light. Brazil's political issues and music then came to the fore. Sepultura targeted and denounced racism, discrimination, xenophobia and neocolonialism, and how they fueled destructive policies and power-hungry politicians. Writing for VICE, author J.J. Anselmi declared that the "social messages of Chaos A.D. are timeless and universal, making it one of the most important metal albums ever recorded."

The lyrics of "Refuse/Resist" mention "tanks on the streets, confronting police, bleeding the plebs." Its chorus ("Refuse! Resist!") resembles a protest march slogan, and when released as a single featured a photograph of a South Korean student rushing at Seoul's riot police contingent while holding a Molotov cocktail. Speaking to Kerrang!, Max Cavalera remembered: "This certainly got in touch with the dark side of Sepultura. "Refuse/Resist" is an anti-police song – a real piece of anarchy. You could call the album riot music. It was full of heavy shit and some of it was risky, but it was just where we were coming from at the time." The next song, "Territory", dealt with the conflict between the Palestinian and Israeli peoples. "Slave New World" — with its lyrics co-written by Biohazard bassist Evan Seinfeld — was a protest against censorship.

Massacres were a major part of Chaos A.D.'s overall theme. "Amen" tackled the massacre of David Koresh's followers in Waco, Texas. "Manifest" had a faux-radio report of the Carandiru massacre, and "Kaiowas" was made in honor of a Brazilian Indian tribe that committed collective suicide in protest against the government that wanted to drive them off the land of their ancestors. "Nomad", written by Andreas, talked about people expelled from their homelands.

On Chaos A.D., Sepultura honored one of their biggest idols, Jello Biafra. Max had called Biafra asking him to contribute to the album with a song about the growing neo-Nazi movement. "I asked for something like 'Nazi Punks Fuck Off - Part 2'", remembers Max, referring to the anti-Nazi song "Nazi Punks Fuck Off" by the Dead Kennedys. But Biafra wasn't interested in recycling old ideas, and suggested a song called "Biotech Is Godzilla", that he had written during his visit to Eco '92, a world conference about ecology organized in Rio de Janeiro. "Jello spent ten minutes explaining me his crazy theories", said Max to Anamaria G. of Bizz magazine, "he said that George Bush had sent a group of scientists to Brazil to test germs and bacteria on human beings and use them as guinea pigs. The lyrics claim that biotechnology created AIDS. But they don't say that technology is bad, just that it's in the wrong hands."

== Release, touring and promotion ==
By the time Chaos A.D. was released on October 11, 1993, and October 19 in the United States, Sepultura were the biggest act of Roadrunner's roster. Aware of the band's increasing popularity, the label spent nearly $1 million on a "marketing blitz" which quickly guaranteed them silver and gold records in Belgium, France and the UK. The group also signed an exclusive distribution deal with a major label, Epic Records, home of Pearl Jam and Rage Against the Machine. This deal eventually went sour: Epic paid little attention to Sepultura, preferring to invest in Fight and Prong.

The Chaos A.D. tour launched on October 23, 1993, with gothic metal band Paradise Lost as the opening act. The tour went well, except for an incident where Berlin's police received a false tip claiming that Sepultura's tour bus was loaded with a major cocaine shipment. Enraged by the unjust search and seizure procedure, Max re-wrote "Antichrist", from their 1985 Bestial Devastation EP, as "Anti-Cop", and then the band proceeded in playing the song live throughout the tour (a recorded version is available on the combined re-release of Bestial Devastation/Morbid Visions and The Roots of Sepultura albums). While touring Europe, rumors floated around that Sepultura would be part of the latest edition of Brazil's Hollywood Rock music festival, taking place in January 1994. The event would happen simultaneously on São Paulo and in Rio de Janeiro. Chaos A.D. has sold more than 2 million copies worldwide. The North American leg, which was co-headlined by Pantera, coincided with the 1994 FIFA World Cup, with the concert in Irvine, California, taking place on July 17, a few hours after the tournament final, in nearby Pasadena. Sepultura, whose members attended the match, took to the stage decorated in the Brazilian colors in celebration of the national team's triumph in the tournament.

In October 1994, the Black Sabbath tribute album Nativity in Black was released. It was the brainchild of producer Bob Chiappardi, a project two years in the making. Nativity in Black featured mostly "up-and-coming" bands such as White Zombie, Biohazard, Type O Negative and Therapy?. Sepultura's contribution was their "Symptom of the Universe" cover, a song they played live since the Beneath the Remains (1989) tour. According to the band, the invitation came due to their good relations with Concrete, Chiappardi's production company. In November, Sepultura did a brief Brazilian tour with The Ramones. Fellow countrymen Viper and Raimundos were the opening acts. The tour spanned five dates, with shows in Curitiba, Florianópolis, Belo Horizonte, Porto Alegre and Santo André. The joint tour came about as happenstance: both bands wanted to tour in Brazil in the same time period.

== Third World Chaos ==
Sepultura's second home video, Third World Chaos, was released in VHS format on June 27, 1995. It features interviews, music videos, behind-the-scenes footage, and portions of concerts and jam sessions from the Chaos AD tour. The video starts with a live (and sped-up) rendition of their Motörhead cover "Orgasmatron" from their 1994 Monsters of Rock show, at Donington Park, UK. It segues to a series of press clippings with Roy Mayorga's "Chaos BC" remix serving as background music. The "Slave New World" promotional video comes next, with a brief making of scene and Max explaining to a Japanese interviewer the song's theme. This leads to Iron Maiden singer Bruce Dickinson interviewing both Max and Andreas, and they clarify the concept behind "Kaiowas" title and how it was recorded. The band plays the song live on MTV Europe and on their Monsters of Rock gig. More backstage antics are shown, now with tourmates Biohazard together in a percussive jam. The promos for "Refuse/Resist" and "Territory" are next.

There is also older archival footage on Third World Chaos. One example is the "Arise" video, whose location shooting was California's Death Valley, where the infamous Manson Family resided for a time in the late 1960s. There is also their first ever promo —"Inner Self"—a track taken from Beneath the Remains.

== Critical reception ==
Professional ratings
Review scores
Source	Rating
AllMusic	4.5/5 stars
Collector's Guide to Heavy Metal	10/10
Entertainment Weekly	B+
NME	6/10
Q	3/5 stars
Rolling Stone	3.5/5 stars

Chaos A.D. received positive reviews from music critics, with many commending the album's experimentation and sense of the band coming into their own. AllMusic declared it one of the best heavy metal albums of all time, calling it "a remarkable achievement not only in its concentrated power and originality, but also in the degree to which Sepultura eclipsed their idols in offering a vision of heavy metal's future." Entertainment Weekly proclaimed that "Sepultura will separate casual headbangers from rabid addicts fast... even non-metalheads will be impressed by the variety in [Chaos A.D.]: they're not averse to slowing things down."

== Legacy and influence ==
Chaos A.D. was a watershed moment for the band, with Ultimate Guitar calling it the album "that elevated Sepultura to even greater heights" as well as "one of the most important and influential metal albums of the 90's". The quartet faced many challenges with the record. For one, they made a risky transition from their earlier death/thrash sound. Sepultura also traversed the radical shift in the rock music scene of the 1990s, with the sudden popularity of alternative rock. "We made a record that was very metal", said Max Cavalera; there "was an explosion of grunge and nobody wanted anything to do with metal." Despite everything, Chaos A.D. was ultimately a triumph. "It was a magical and very inspiring time" remembers the elder Cavalera.

Sound of the Beast author Ian Christe credits Chaos A.D., along with Pantera, for developing the groove metal style, which would later influence other artists in the 1990s. It is one of Joe Duplantier's top ten albums, guitarist-songwriter for Gojira. In his opinion, Chaos A.D. "gave birth to the whole nu-metal scene." Korn were inspired by the album when they started out. At least two members from Slipknot attested how Chaos A.D. was important to them.

Chaos A.D. was ranked 29th on Rolling Stone's and 63th on NME's 100 greatest metal albums lists. "Refuse/Resist", the album's first single, charted at number 26 in VH1's "40 Greatest Metal Songs" list. In Rolling Stone Brasil's list of the 100 greatest MPB records, Chaos A.D. held the 46th position. According to the magazine, the album was a "point of inflection" for the band and the heavy metal scene. It paved the way to "another essential record"—Roots—ranked No. 57 in the same list.

At the first Kerrang! Awards ceremony in 1994, Chaos A.D. won the award for Best Album.

=== Impact ===
Sepultura's newfound interest in the music and socials ills of Brazil inspired—or ran parallel to—their fellow countrymen's own MPB/metal experiments. One particular case was Overdose, Sepultura's former Cogumelo labelmates. Overdose's 5th album, Progress of Decadence (1993), opened with "Rio, Samba e Porrada na Morro", an industrial-meets-samba intro five years in the making. The rest of the album segues into their own brand of groove metal. Furthermore, Overdose inserted political themes in their lyrics, although they had been doing such before Sepultura.

Saravá metal group Gangrena Gasosa's debut Welcome to Terreiro (1993) opens with "Troops of Olodum", a spoof on Sepultura's "Troops of Doom" complete with the song's intro riff and Olodum-styled percussion.

On Brazilian band Angra's concept album, Holy Land, lead guitar player Kiko Loureiro said that, when composing for their second album, the MPB influence "came naturally". Despite this statement there was, indeed, a concerted effort by the group to explore their Brazilian musical identity. It was partly a response to the criticism directed towards Angels Cry (1993), which drew many comparisons to Helloween, Iron Maiden and others. Holy Land and Sepultura's Roots were released a month apart from each other, and they both highlighted a major moment for Brazil's metal scene.

Although it became a popular trend in the 1990s, the mixing of metal and percussion remains a controversial topic in the Brazilian scene. One example is the "tribal" thrash metal of Krucipha, which takes inspiration from Pernambuco's maracatu through the states' manguebeat movement. The band's music still divides opinions, enraging metal purists.

== Track listing ==
All music is composed by Sepultura, except where noted.

No.	Title	Lyrics	Length
1.	"Refuse/Resist"	Max Cavalera	3:20
2.	"Territory"	Andreas Kisser	4:47
3.	"Slave New World"	Evan Seinfeld; Max Cavalera	2:55
4.	"Amen"	Max Cavalera	4:27
5.	"Kaiowas"	(instrumental)	3:43
6.	"Propaganda"	Max Cavalera	3:33
7.	"Biotech Is Godzilla"	Jello Biafra	1:52
8.	"Nomad"	Andreas Kisser	4:59
9.	"We Who Are Not as Others"	Max Cavalera	3:42
10.	"Manifest"	Max Cavalera	4:49
11.	"The Hunt" (New Model Army cover)	Justin Sullivan; Robert Heaton	3:59
12.	"Clenched Fist" ( (Note: "Clenched Fist" ends at 4:58, after a minute of silence, an untitled hidden track starts at 5:58. Later releases ommit the track or places the track after the song "Polícia," with the same minutes of silence.))	Max Cavalera	8:01
Total length:			47:04

1993 bonus track version (American edition)
No.	Title	Length
13.	"Polícia" (Titãs cover)	1:47

1996 reissue (American edition)
No.	Title	Lyrics	Length
13.	"Chaos B.C. (from the 1996 album Mortal Kombat: More Kombat)"	Andreas Kisser; Igor Cavalera; Max Cavalera; Roy Mayorga	5:12
14.	"Kaiowas (Tribal Jam)"	(instrumental)	3:47
15.	"Territory (live)"	Max Cavalera	4:48
16.	"Amen/Inner Self (live)"	Andreas Kisser; Max Cavalera	8:42

== Personnel ==
=== Sepultura ===
- Max Cavalera – vocals, rhythm guitar, 4-string guitar, nylon string guitar
- Igor Cavalera – drums, percussion
- Paulo Jr. – bass, floor tom
- Andreas Kisser – lead guitar, 12-strings viola, steel-string acoustic guitar

=== Production staff ===
- Simon Dawson – assistant engineer
- Alex Newport – guitar sound, feedback advisor
- Dave Somers – assistant engineer
- Andy Wallace – producer, mixing
- George Marino – mastering
- Steve Remote – recording engineer
- Michael Whelan – cover artwork
- Gary Monroe – photography

== Charts ==
Chart (1993–1994)	Peak position
Australian Albums (ARIA)	27
Austrian Albums (Ö3 Austria)	19
Dutch Albums (Album Top 100)	21
European Albums (European Top 100 Albums)	18
Finnish Albums (The Official Finnish Charts)	4
German Albums (Offizielle Top 100)	11
Hungarian Albums (MAHASZ)	23
New Zealand Albums (RMNZ)	15
Norwegian Albums (VG-lista)	16
Portuguese Albums (AFP)	6
Scottish Albums (Official Charts)	84
Swedish Albums (Sverigetopplistan)	11
Swiss Albums (Schweizer Hitparade)	15
UK Albums (Official Charts)	11
UK Rock & Metal Albums (ERA)	5
US Billboard 200	32

Chart (1996)	Peak position
UK Rock & Metal Albums (Official Charts)	21

== Certifications ==
Region	Certification	Certified units/sales
Australia (ARIA)	Gold	35,000^{^}
Brazil (Pro-Música Brasil)	Gold	100,000^{*}
Indonesia	Gold	25,000
Netherlands (NVPI)	Gold	50,000^{^}
United Kingdom (BPI)	Gold	100,000^{^}
United States (RIAA)	Gold	500,000^{^}
^{*} Sales figures based on certification alone.^{^} Shipments figures based on certification alone.
