= Against (album) =

Studio album by Sepultura
- Released: 6 October 1998
- Recorded: 1998
- Studio: List: ÍON Studios (São Paulo, Brazil); House Of Blues Studios (Encino, California); Hook Studios (North Hollywood, California); Sparky Dark Studios (Calabasas, California); Image Recording Studios (Hollywood, California); Chophouse Studios (Walnut Creek, California); Golden Track Studios (San Diego, California); Kodo Village Studios (Sado Island, Japan
- Genres: Groove metal; nu metal
- Length: 47:26
- Label: Roadrunner
- Producers: Howard Benson; Sepultura

Sepultura chronology
Blood-Rooted (1997)	Against (1998)	Nation (2001)

Singles from Against
- 1. "Choke" Released: November 28, 1998; 2. "Against" Released: 1999; 3. "Tribus" Released: June 1999

Against is the seventh studio album by Brazilian heavy metal band Sepultura, released in 1998 through Roadrunner Records. It is the band's first release with frontman Derrick Green, who replaced group founder Max Cavalera in 1997.

== Album information ==
Like Roots before it, the album has a variety of guest musicians and incorporates tribal influences. Japanese percussion elements are added with the assistance of taiko group Kodo.

The songs "Against", "Choke" and "Tribus" were released as singles, with a music video accompanying "Choke". The video featured footage from the Barulho Contra Fome (Noise Against Hunger) concert that was the first show of the Against tour. This performance included guest appearances from the Xavante tribe, who were featured on Roots (as documented in the "Choke" video) as well as Mike Patton, Jason Newsted, Carlinhos Brown, original Sepultura guitarist Jairo Guedz and Coffin Joe (whose "blessing" of the band performed during this concert turned up as a B-side entitled "Prenúncio" on the Tribus EP).

The flute section of "Kamaitachi" performed by Kodo is based on "The Hunted", which appeared on Kodo's Ibuki album and was originally composed for the soundtrack of the movie of the same name. The song "The Waste" (a vocal version of "Kamaitachi" featuring Mike Patton that appeared on the single B-sides) is featured in the movie Freddy vs. Jason and its soundtrack.

== Release ==
Against was a commercial disappointment compared to Roots, selling only 18,000 copies its first week in the US, and peaking at 82 on the Billboard 200. It also underperformed elsewhere, such as in Germany and the Netherlands. It has sold over 130,000 copies in the United States. To support the album, the band toured with Metallica in the latter's May 1999 tour in Brazil, and opened for Slayer in an American tour.

== Reception ==
Professional ratings
Review scores
Source	Rating
AllMusic	3/5 stars
Chronicles of Chaos	9/10
Collector's Guide to Heavy Metal	8/10
The Encyclopedia of Popular Music	2/5 stars
Melody Maker	4/5 stars
NME	7/10

Against has received mixed-to-positive reviews since it was released. AllMusic gave the album 3 stars out of 5 and said that "there are enough flashes of the old Sepultura brilliance to suggest that great things are still to come". The album received a very positive response from Chronicles of Chaos, who said, "The new LP focuses on and showcases the real power of Sepultura, managing to reinvent themselves once again with this LP, but still stay so close to Sepultura's trademark sound."

=== Legacy ===
"Choke", "Boycott" and the title track were still being played live during the Machine Messiah era (2017–2018) and after. Notably, "Reza" (with João Gordo from Ratos de Porão) and "Against" were played in the final concert of band's career, in November 2026 in São Paulo.

In 2019, singer Derrick Green stated, "I feel so proud and happy about it, because it has affected so many people that I didn't realise (back then). At the time when we were playing the shows, people had just gotten into the changes of the band, but so many people have great stories from their first time hearing this album. So I really feel it now when we play these songs, how excited people get, you know? It's great to see that the evolution of people having time to 'ingest' all the changes and everything. It's such an important album for keeping the band together."

== Track listing ==
No.	Title	Lyrics	Music	Length
1.	"Against"	Andreas Kisser	Kisser; Igor Cavalera	1:54
2.	"Choke"	Kisser	Kisser; Cavalera	3:36
3.	"Rumors"	Kisser	Kisser; Cavalera	3:04
4.	"Old Earth"	Kisser; Derrick Green	Kisser; Cavalera; Paulo Jr.	4:28
5.	"Floaters in Mud"	Kisser; Green	Kisser; Cavalera	4:58
6.	"Boycott"	Kisser	Kisser; Cavalera	3:10
7.	"Tribus"		Cavalera; Kisser	1:39
8.	"Common Bonds"	Kisser	Kisser; Cavalera; Paulo Jr.	2:58
9.	"F.O.E." (Jimmy Bowen cover*)		James L. Bowen	2:08
10.	"Reza" (Pray – featuring João Gordo from Ratos de Porão on vocals)	João Gordo	Kisser; Cavalera	2:16
11.	"Unconscious"	Kisser	Kisser; Cavalera	3:37
12.	"Kamaitachi" (featuring Kodo)		Kisser; Cavalera	3:03
13.	"Drowned Out"	Green	Kisser; Cavalera	1:28
14.	"Hatred Aside" (featuring Jason Newsted from Metallica on baritone guitar, percussion, theremin and vocals)	Kisser; Jason Newsted; Green	Kisser; Newsted; Cavalera; Paulo Jr.	5:13
15.	"T3rcermillennium"		Kisser; Cavalera; Paulo Jr.	3:56
Total length:				47:26

Brazilian bonus tracks
No.	Title	Lyrics	Music	Length
16.	"Gene Machine/Don't Bother Me" (Bad Brains cover)	Gary Miller; Darryl Jenifer; Paul Hudson	Miller; Jenifer; Hudson	2:51
17.	"Prenúncio" (Prenounce – featuring Coffin Joe and Jairo Guedz)	José Mojica Marins	Kisser; Cavalera; Paulo Jr.	5:10

== Personnel ==
- Derrick Green – lead vocals, rhythm guitar
- Andreas Kisser – lead guitar, backing vocals
- Paulo Jr. – bass
- Igor Cavalera – drums, percussion
- Recorded at
  - ION Studios, São Paulo, Brazil
  - House of Blues Studios, Encino, California, US
  - The Hook Studios, North Hollywood, US
  - Sparky Dark Studios, Calabasas, California, US
  - Image Studios, Los Angeles, California, US
  - Chophouse Studio, Walnut Creek, California, US
  - Golden Track Studios, San Diego, California, US
  - KODO Village, Sado Island, Japan
- Produced by Howard Benson and Sepultura
- Recorded and engineered by Carlo Bartolini
- Mixed by Tim Palmer at Scream Studios, Studio City, California, US
- Mixed by Howard Benson and Bobbie Brooks at The Gallery, Encino, California, US
- Mix assisted by James Saez and Mark Moncrief
- Assistant engineered by David Bryant, Daniel Mantovani, Tosh Kasai, and James Bennett
- Tape Op by Skye A.K. Correa
- Mike Curry – cover art

== Singles ==
- "Choke" – released in 1998

No.	Title	Length
1.	"Choke"	3:36
2.	"Gene Machine/Don't Bother Me" (Bad Brains cover)	2:51
3.	"Against (demo)"	1:38

- "Against" – released in 1999

No.	Title	Length
1.	"Against"	1:54
2.	"The Waste" (featuring Mike Patton and Kodo – a vocal version of Kamaitachi)	3:39
3.	"Tribus (demo)"	1:45
4.	"Common Bonds (alternate mix)"	3:04

- "Tribus" – released in 1999

No.	Title	Length
1.	"The Waste" (featuring Mike Patton and Kodo – a vocal version of Kamaitachi)	3:39
2.	"Tribus (demo)"	1:45
3.	"Common Bonds (alternate mix)"	3:04
4.	"Unconscious (demo)"	3:42
5.	"F.O.E. (extended mix)" (Jimmy Bowen cover)	3:04
6.	"Prenúncio" (Prenounce – featuring Coffin Joe and Jairo Guedz)	5:10

== Charts ==
Chart (1998–1999)	Peak position
Australian Albums (ARIA)	25
Austrian Albums (Ö3 Austria)	23
Belgian Albums (Ultratop Flanders)	24
Canada Top Albums/CDs (RPM)	83
Dutch Albums (Album Top 100)	76
Finnish Albums (Suomen virallinen lista)	38
French Albums (SNEP)	33
German Albums (Offizielle Top 100)	23
New Zealand Albums (RMNZ)	44
Scottish Albums (Official Charts)	42
Swedish Albums (Sverigetopplistan)	33
UK Albums (Official Charts)	40
UK Rock & Metal Albums (Official Charts)	1
US Billboard 200	82
