= Arise (Sepultura song) =

Single by Sepultura

from the album Arise
- B-side: "Inner Self" (live); "Troops of Doom" (live)
- Released: 1991
- Recorded: 1990–1991 at Morrisound Recording in Tampa, Florida
- Genre: Thrash metal; death metal
- Length: 3:17
- Label: Roadrunner
- Songwriters: Max Cavalera; Igor Cavalera; Andreas Kisser; Paulo Jr.
- Producer: Scott Burns

Sepultura singles chronology
"Arise" (1991)	"Dead Embryonic Cells" (1991)

"Arise" is Sepultura's first official single, as well as the first of three to be released from the album of the same name.

The song is one of Sepultura's best known songs and is sometimes called a thrash metal masterpiece. Max Cavalera states that it's his favorite Sepultura song and he's especially proud of it.

== History ==
At this stage in their career the band had recorded little material to be used as B-sides, which is why the Arise singles are so similar. B-sides on this single were taken from the Under Siege (Live in Barcelona) VHS.

== Music video ==
A controversial music video for the song was produced and can be found on the VHS release Third World Chaos, which was later released on DVD as part of Chaos DVD. The video was filmed in Death Valley and features footage of the band playing during daylight, mixed with images of a Christ-like figure in a gas mask, hung on a cross. The video was banned by MTV America due to its apocalyptic religious imagery.

== Cover versions ==
- American deathcore band Crematorium on Various Cover Sessions EP, 1997 – also released on the World of Pain: A Tribute to Sepultura CD, 1999.
- Swedish death metal and thrash metal band The Crown on Sepultural Feast: A Tribute to Sepultura CD, 1998.
- Finnish extreme power metal band Kalmah on the Japanese and UK editions of their fifth album, For the Revolution, 2008.
- Indonesian death metal band DeadSquad covered the track on their debut album Horror Vision, 2009.
- American thrash metal band Havok included their cover on Point of No Return EP, 2012.
- Belgian death metal Aborted released their version on Scriptures of the Dead EP, 2014.

== Track listing ==
1. "Arise" (album version)
2. "Inner Self" (from Under Siege (Live in Barcelona))
3. "Troops of Doom" (from Under Siege (Live in Barcelona))

== Personnel ==
- Max Cavalera – lead vocals, rhythm guitar
- Igor Cavalera – drums
- Andreas Kisser – lead guitar, bass (uncredited)
- Paulo Jr. – bass (credited, but did not perform)
- Produced by Scott Burns and Sepultura
- Recorded and engineered by Scott Burns
- Mixed by Andy Wallace
- Assistant engineers: Fletcher McClean and Steve Sisco

== See also ==
- Other songs titled "Arise"
