= Roots (Sepultura album) =

1996 studio album by Sepultura

Studio album by Sepultura
- Released: February 20, 1996 (Europe); March 12, 1996 (U.S.)
- Recorded: October–December 1995
- Studio: Indigo Ranch Studios (Malibu, California)
- Genres: Groove metal; nu metal
- Length: 72:08
- Label: Roadrunner
- Producer: Ross Robinson

Sepultura chronology
Chaos A.D. (1993)	Roots (1996)	Against (1998)

Singles from Roots
- 1. "Roots Bloody Roots" Released: February 18, 1996; 2. "Attitude" Released: June 1996; 3. "Ratamahatta" Released: October 1996

Roots is the sixth studio album by Brazilian heavy metal band Sepultura. It was released in Europe on February 20, 1996 and in the U.S. three weeks later on March 12 by Roadrunner Records. It is the band's last studio album to feature founder and vocalist/rhythm guitarist Max Cavalera, who left in late 1996 at the conclusion of a run of European dates in support of the album.

Following the shift to slower tempos and Latin-tinged rhythms on Chaos A.D., Roots delves further into Brazilian musical textures and features significant contributions from iconic Brazilian musician Carlinhos Brown, who guided and arranged the sections throughout the album that feature ensemble percussion playing. Both in sound and overall aesthetic, Roots is a conscious nod to Brazil's marginalized indigenous population and cultures. The song "Itsári" features a Xavante chant that re-appears on the song "Born Stubborn" and serves as a loose thematic thread for the album, which showcases the band's increased affinity for experimentation and collaboration.

"Lookaway" features guest appearances by Korn vocalist Jonathan Davis, then-Korn drummer David Silveria, House of Pain/Limp Bizkit turntablist DJ Lethal, and Faith No More/Mr. Bungle vocalist Mike Patton. Riff-wise, Roots also draws influence from the then-surging nu metal movement, specifically Korn (whose first two albums were also produced by Roots producer Ross Robinson) and Deftones. After leaving the band, Max Cavalera continued pursuing the nu metal and "world" stylings of Roots with his band Soulfly.

Roots has received critical acclaim as a seminal work in Sepultura's discography. It has proven commercially successful, selling over two million copies worldwide, and remains Sepultura's highest-charting album, peaking at 27 on the Billboard 200.

== Background and recording ==
Roots is the product of a concerted effort on the band's part to embrace its Brazilian heritage, including indigenous sounds that were unfamiliar to the Sepultura's members up to that point. The album reflects Sepultura's heightened focus on the music, culture, politics, and history of their native country. The overarching concept was inspired by the film At Play in the Fields of the Lord (particularly the scene in which Tom Berenger's character parachutes into an Amazonian village populated by the Niaruna people). The movie inspired Max Cavalera to try and record with a Native Brazilian tribe. After convincing Roadrunner Records to support the project, Cavalera contacted Angela Pappiani, at the time the communications coordinator for Brazil's Núcleo de Cultura Indígena (Indigenous Culture Center). Nearly one year after Cavalera's initial contact, Pappiani arranged for a small party including band, herself, Robinson, and then-manager Gloria Cavalera to travel to Mato Grosso, Brazil to visit the Xavante tribe and record with them. At the time, the members of Sepultura were only peripherally aware of the indigenous tribes residing in Brazil's interior.

In a 2016 interview with Nashville Scene, Igor Cavalera remembered:

Every second of that trip was insane in a very inspiring way. But there's a few things that really stand out. Like when they explained to us that the only way they wrote music was if someone in the tribe dreamed of the music. They couldn't just write a lyric or a melody. It has to be transmitted to them in a dream. From a musician's point of view, it was like, "Wow, this is a completely different way of approaching music."

University of Iowa anthropology professor Laura Graham explained the role of music in Xavante culture to PopMatters in 2016:

For them, music functions as a medium for entering into other realms—whether they be other dimensions of existence or other cultures. Well before they had any contact with white people, part of their culture has always entailed that men engage the spirit world, especially through music. This happens in their dreams. Not all, but most of their music is inspired—you could say "composed", although they say received—in their dreams through encounters with other worlds. When people come and visit the community from the outside, one of the things the Xavante ask them to do is sing them a song. Music is this medium for entering into relations with others—others meaning spiritual beings or, for example, white society or other cultures. The Xavante want to be known and they want their culture to be known. They want their music to be known because they think it's beautiful and view it as a contribution to humanity. It's like, "We have something beautiful to contribute to humanity—and, by the way, here we are suffering. We want people to know who we are and that we exist." And so when they got this proposal from a musical group that wanted to come jam and share music with them, they loved it.

A spokesman for the tribe looked back on the collaboration: "We had seen pictures of Sepultura and we knew that they were different, with their long hair and many tattoos. We also knew that they had been discriminated, like we were. Because of that we were very curious about them."

Meeting the Xavante was by several accounts a life-changing experience that has continued to resonate with the members of Sepultura ever since. Igor has also said that the band identified a lot with the natives: "In a certain way, I think that we, as a band, had a lot of things in common with the Xavante Indians. We also lived on the edge of society, and our music and lifestyle is a long way from being assimilated and respected by that society."

After the trip, recording resumed with Robinson at Indigo Ranch, at the time Robinson's studio of choice. According to the same 2016 Nashville Scene article, by that point the band had amassed "an overabundance of material." Igor Cavalera remembered that it was a challenge to prevent the album from becoming "a gigantic jam that didn't turn into actual songs." He added: "It was quite a difficult record to finish. We did so much recording that the amount of stuff we had going on was quite crazy. We had to make sure not to let anything really special slip by. It was tricky to go through all of it, and it took a lot of time to find out what would work with what we were already writing."

According to Korn guitarist Brian Welch in a November 1996 interview, his "own Bigger Muff guitar pedal" that he had initially modified and then used for his band was reused to his "great dismay" for recording the Roots album.

== Composition ==
Roots represents a significant shift in direction for Sepultura. On several levels, the album reflects a concerted effort on the band's part to embrace its Brazilian heritage, with a heightened focus on Brazilian culture that is strikingly apparent in the music. Musically speaking, the inspiration for the shift was twofold: One was the desire to further experiment with both Latin and indigenous strains of the music of Brazil, including the percussive style of the Salvador, Bahia samba reggae group Olodum. Roots was also inspired by Korn's self-titled debut, with its heavily down-tuned guitars.

Roots is a groove metal and nu metal album that incorporates thrash metal, death metal, world music, various Brazilian musical styles (including Brazilian folk music), tribal music, and ambient field recordings. All of the songs on Roots draw from these styles, with the band often blending them in unconventional ways and at times super-imposing them onto one another through creative mixing and editing in post-production. Several songs feature Brazilian instrumentation that had up to that point never been used by a metal band, and the album is peppered with ensemble percussion sections played by the band along with Carlinhos Brown.

Of the album's prominent Latin influence, Igor Cavalera told Nashville Scene:

I'd always wanted to do a little more stuff with a Latin feel, but it took until Chaos A.D. to realize how we could make that into something that wasn't too clichéd. That was always my fear. I'd been exposed to samba and the African Brazilian rhythms before I played the drums, and I'd always had a lot of caution about incorporating them in the right way, and not doing it for the sake of just having them there. It took us a lot of research and time to make sure that we did it in a way that felt completely natural. It wasn't just like "OK, we like this and it makes sense, so let's just do it." It took a lot to develop.

== Lyrical and visual themes ==
Disparate elements of Brazilian culture permeate every aspect of Roots, from the music to the lyrics to the artwork and visuals to the videos the band made for the songs "Roots Bloody Roots," "Attitude," and "Ratamahatta." The album cover features an indigenous man of the Karajá tribe taken from a 1990 banknote of the discontinued Brazilian cruzeiro, to which artist Michael Whelan added a locket with Sepultura's "tribal S" logo and a background of red roots.

Much of Roots references Brazilian culture, history, lore, and politics, either directly or indirectly. According to Max Cavalera, "Roots Bloody Roots" is "about believe in yourself, about be proud of your heritage, proud of where you come from. Really powerful but simple lyrics. So it's really about just be down with your own roots and believe in your roots". In a 1996 MTV Europe clip, Max Cavalera explained the meaning behind the song as: "Don't give in. What you believe is for life, even if people try all the time to change you. The song is about 'don't let the bastards grind you down.'"

"Ratamahatta" is "a celebration of life in Brazil's favela slums, sung mostly in Portuguese, which tells the stories of people like Zé do Caixão (Coffin Joe) and Lampião, the leader of an early 1900s outlaw gang from north Brazil, whose head was put on public display after he was captured". "Itsári" ("Roots" in the Xavante language) features a Xavante healing ceremony chant. "Ambush" is "a tribute to murdered South American rain-forest activist Chico Mendes". "Dictatorshit" addresses the 1964 Brazilian coup d'état. "Endangered Species" addresses environmental destruction. "Cut-Throat" is about Epic Records, who the band had some trouble with during their previous album, Chaos A.D.; the last words in the song are "Enslavement, Pathetic, Ignorant, Corporations", spelling "Epic". The lyrics to "Attitude" were co-written by Dana Wells, Max Cavalera's stepson, whose death (in part) led to the events which caused Max to leave the band. Dana also came up with the concept for the video for the song, featuring Brazilian Jiu-Jitsu experts the Gracie family.

== Release and commercial performance ==
"Roots Bloody Roots" was Sepultura's first Top 40 hit on the UK Singles Chart, reaching number 19 in February 1996. Chart watcher James Masterton considered its success to prove the eclecticism of the British charts: "You would be hard pressed to find any single on release this week as utterly uncommercial as this and whilst a swift exit next week is assured the presence of the single is still cause to celebrate the 'anything goes' culture of a chart that is based on nothing more than the records people choose to buy." "Ratamahatta" followed, reaching number 23 in August 1996.

== Critical reception ==
Professional ratings
Review scores
Source	Rating
AllMusic	4.5/5 stars
Chicago Tribune	3.5/4 stars
Entertainment Weekly	C−
Houston Chronicle	4/5 stars
Los Angeles Times	3.5/4 stars
NME	7/10
Q	3/5 stars
Record Collector	4/5 stars
Rolling Stone	3/5 stars
Spin	6/10

American newspapers like The New Times, the Daily News and the Los Angeles Times reviewed the Brazilian band: "The mixture of the dense metal of Sepultura and the Brazilian music has a intoxicating effect", wrote a Los Angeles Times reviewer. The Daily News praised the album saying: "Sepultura reinvented the wheel. By mixing metal with native instruments, the band resuscitates the tired genre, reminding of Led Zeppelin times. But while Zeppelin mixed English metal with African beats, it's still more moving to hear a band that uses elements of its own country. By extracting the sounds of the past, Sepultura determines the future direction of metal".

Specialized heavy metal critics also reviewed the album positively. Martin Popoff, author of the book The Collector's Guide to Heavy Metal, ranked Roots as the 11th best metal record of all time. "This is a spectacular metal and futurist hardcore LP", wrote Popoff, "a masterpiece, accomplished by a band with an enormous heart and an even larger intellect". Kerrang! magazine awarded Roots second place in the list of "100 records that you have to hear before dying". In 2001, Q magazine named Roots as one of the 50 Heaviest Albums Of All Time. Rolling Stone Brasil named it the 57th best Brazilian music album. Rolling Stone contributor Jon Wiederhorn gave the album three stars out of five and said, "Sepultura play a violent game of sonic overload... the band uses its catharsis as a creative force, funneling torrents of noise into a tunnel of hate" and called the album "a refreshing step forward in a genre full of bands that are creatively bankrupt." Music critic Robert Christgau gave the album a negative "dud" rating. Looking back on the album 20 years later, PopMatters contributor Saby Reyes-Kulkarni described Roots as "inarguably one of the most radical [stylistic] departures from convention in heavy metal history," an album that "blew the doors open on our perceptions of metal and so-called 'world music,'" adding that "we haven't heard anything quite like it since." In April 2005, Decibel inducted Roots into the Decibel Magazine Hall of Fame, becoming the third album overall to receive a coveted spot in their Hall of Fame.

== Legacy ==
Shane Mehling of Decibel, commenting on the album's nu metal sound, likens the reaction from the metal community to the Electric Dylan controversy and writes that "there's still plenty of raw emotion about what that record did to heavy music." Mehling himself deemed the record "a massive blow to metal purists, some of whom had already been disappointed by Sepultura moving away from thrash on their previous album, Chaos A.D. The smolder of Korn's increasing popularity may have worried some, but Roots was like Nero downtuning while Rome burned." Greg Whalen of Terrorizer, who was a fan of Sepultura, recalled that Roots "was like someone took a fish and slapped me across the face with it. It was the most reprehensible thing. They could write these amazing riffs and technical parts, and they just dumb it down to lowest common denominator status. And it almost physically hurt me."

Speaking to Kerrang! in 2008, Max Cavalera looked back on Roots:

Roots came from a blurry dream I had about going to the rainforest. Wine may have been involved. In the end, when we actually went into the forest to record, it was unbelievable. The whole album was a huge personal journey for me, and as a Brazilian, it felt as an incredible achievement. Everyone was inspired and Igor was at the top of his game. The percussion was crazy and we worked with so many great musicians, in the end coming out with a 15-minutes drum jam that someone likened to a crazy Brazilian Pink Floyd. When we took the album to Roadrunner they loved it except for the title. They thought it would sound like a Bob Marley tribute album. We explained it to them, and thankfully they got it.

As for the Xavantes, both their leader at the time of the band's visit (Cipassé) and Pappiani agree that Roots helped the tribe gain some visibility, to the point that people would actually identify them as Xavantes instead of just calling them "indigenous people". Pappiani noticed an increase in people's interest for information on the tribe and their music.

On March 25, 2021, French heavy metal band Gojira released the single "Amazonia", a song about anti-deforestation of the Amazon and the protection of Brazilian indigenous peoples' rights. Shortly after its release on April 15, frontman Joe Duplantier in an interview with Blabbermouth.net was asked his thoughts about comparing "Amazonia" to Sepultura, to which he said:

I go, "Yup." And it's a compliment, and there is no shame here. And we ripped them off, but we didn't do it on purpose. But we realized it right after. We were, like, "Oh, that sounds like SEPULTURA. Ahhh, whatever." It's a tribute to Sepultura — how about that? It's about Brazil. It's about the Amazon. It's tribal.

Brazilian UFC fighter Alex Pereira uses the song 'Itsári' as his signature walkout music before his fights. Commentators have noted the connection between the song and Pereira's indigenous heritage.

Saby Reyes-Kulkarni stated of Roots in 2016, "we can still only point to a handful of acts that have even nibbled at cross-continental mass appeal by blending metal with music that strikes Western ears as comparably remote and alien", noting the Armenian, Assyrian, and Sumerian cultural influence on Melechesh; as well as the Taiwanese cultural influence on Chthonic. Alien Weaponry have also been compared to Roots-era Sepultura due to their usage of Māori culture in their music, stemming from their own Māori heritage. Drummer Henry de Jong said they were not aware of Sepultura before writing their first song in the Māori language, but Youtube commenters compared them. de Jong found it strange seeing how similar they were despite being years apart and not knowing what Sepultura had done.

Keith Kahn-Harris analyzed the album's influence for its 25th anniversary in 2021. He found it important for expanding the boundaries of metal into other kinds of music in the world, but considered the album's sound to cross the line from raw into half-baked at times, particularly in its integration of Brazilian music. He states "In folk metal today you find a much more seamless melding of metal and its musical others. Korpiklaani and Finntroll are not jam bands, they are effortlessly slick and do not question their entitlement to evoke their mythic ancestors. Orphaned Land and Melechesh are not incorporating Middle Eastern influences into their music, it is their music. Even bands that owe a lot musically to Sepultura, such as Alien Weaponry, sound much more comfortable in their own skin." Kahn-Harris also argued that while Roots was influential on nu-metal, it didn't entirely fit due to its influence from 80s anarcho-punk. He concluded that Roots "doesn't really map out as much new musical territory as was claimed at the time", but was nonetheless still very enjoyable. That same year, the staff of Revolver included the album in their list of the "20 Essential Nu-Metal Albums".

In 2025, Rae Lemeshow-Barooshian of Loudwire included the album in her list of "the top 50 nu-metal albums of all time", ranking it eighteenth. Spin ranked Roots at number 30 in their 2002 list of the "40 Greatest Metal Albums of All Time", with Chuck Klosterman deeming it "death metal as world music as universal horror-flick soundtrack" and praising it for advancing the use of native Brazilian sounds from Chaos A.D., saying Roots mixes "tribal chants, polyrhythms, and norteamericano ringer Jonathan Davis of Korn with political fury and into-the-abyss guitar."

== Track listing ==
All lyrics are written by Max Cavalera, except where noted; all music is composed by Sepultura, except where noted.

No.	Title	Lyrics	Music	Length
1.	"Roots Bloody Roots"			3:32
2.	"Attitude"	Max Cavalera; Dana Wells		4:15
3.	"Cut-Throat"			2:44
4.	"Ratamahatta" (featuring David Silveria and Carlinhos Brown)	Sepultura; Carlinhos Brown	Sepultura; Carlinhos Brown	4:30
5.	"Breed Apart"	Andreas Kisser; Max Cavalera		4:01
6.	"Straighthate"			5:21
7.	"Spit"			2:45
8.	"Lookaway" (featuring Jonathan Davis, Mike Patton and DJ Lethal)	Jonathan Davis	Sepultura; DJ Lethal	5:26
9.	"Dusted"	Andreas Kisser	Andreas Kisser	4:03
10.	"Born Stubborn"			4:07
11.	"Jasco"	(instrumental)	Andreas Kisser	1:57
12.	"Itsári"	(instrumental)	Xavante Tribe; Sepultura	4:48
13.	"Ambush"			4:39
14.	"Endangered Species"			5:19
15.	"Dictatorshit" ( (Note: "Dictatorshit" ends at 1:26. A hidden track entitled "Canyon Jam" immediately starts at 1:27. On vinyl releases "Canyon Jam" is ommited or replaced with outtakes, demos, and live tracks.))			14:42
Total length:				72:08

=== Roadrunner Records: The 25th Anniversary Series bonus disc ===
No.	Title	Length
1.	"Procreation (Of the Wicked)" (Celtic Frost cover)	3:39
2.	"Mine" (featuring Mike Patton)	6:25
3.	"War" (Bob Marley cover)	6:40
4.	"Lookaway" (Master Vibe mix)"	5:36
5.	"Mine (Andy Wallace mix)"	7:58
6.	"Dusted" (demo)	4:27
7.	"Roots Bloody Roots" (demo)	3:32
8.	"R.D.P." (demo)	1:15
9.	"Untitled" (demo)	4:14
10.	"Attitude" (live at Ozzfest)	5:37
11.	"Roots Bloody Roots (Megawatt mix one)"	4:01
12.	"Roots Bloody Roots (Megawatt mix two)"	4:08

== The Roots of Sepultura ==
The Roots of Sepultura

Compilation album by Sepultura
- Released: 29 November 1996
- Genres: Thrash metal; death metal
- Length: 73:37
- Languages: English; Portuguese
- Label: Roadrunner
- Compilers: Monte Conner; Borivoj Krgin

Sepultura chronology
The Roots of Sepultura (1996)	Blood-Rooted (1997)

The Roots of Sepultura is a double-disc album by Sepultura, released in November 1996. The second disc contains a collection of unreleased tracks, B-sides, alternate mixes, and live recordings. This release differs from Roots and the 2005 25th Anniversary Roots album as the B-sides disc has a different series of tracks. This album includes covers of tracks by Motörhead, Dead Kennedys, Os Mutantes and Ratos de Porão and also includes tracks from their first live home video, Under Siege (Live in Barcelona).

=== Track listing ===
No.	Title	Length
1.	"Intro"	1:33
2.	"C.I.U. (Criminals in Uniform)"	4:17
3.	"Orgasmatron" (Motörhead cover)	4:15
4.	"Dead Embryonic Cells" (original mix)	4:31
5.	"Desperate Cry" (original mix)	6:42
6.	"Murder" (original mix)	3:25
7.	"Under Siege (Regnum Irae)" (original mix)	4:44
8.	"Necromancer" (demo)	3:59
9.	"The Past Reborns the Storms" (demo)	5:08
10.	"A Hora e a Vez do Cabelo Nascer" (Os Mutantes cover)	2:21
11.	"Drug Me" (Dead Kennedys cover)	1:53
12.	"Crucificados pelo Sistema" (Ratos de Porão cover, "Slave New World" 1994 B-side)	1:03
13.	"Anticop" (live)	3:02
14.	"Intro" (live)	1:30
15.	"Arise" (live)	2:51
16.	"Inner Self" (live)	4:42
17.	"Mass Hypnosis" (live)	4:25
18.	"Escape to the Void" (live)	5:03
19.	"Troops of Doom" (live)	2:53
20.	"Altered State" (live)	5:20

== Personnel ==
=== Sepultura ===
- Max Cavalera – lead vocals, 4 and 6-string rhythm guitar, berimbau
- Andreas Kisser – lead guitar, backing vocals, sitar
- Paulo Jr. – bass, timbau grandé
- Igor Cavalera – drums, percussion, timbau, djembe

=== Additional personnel ===
- Jairo Guedz - lead guitar (on "Necromancer")
- Mike Patton – vocals (on "Lookaway")
- David Silveria – drums (on "Ratamahatta")
- Carlinhos Brown – vocals, percussion, berimbau, timbau, wood drums, lataria, xequere, surdos (on "Ratamahatta")
- Jonathan Davis – vocals (on "Lookaway")
- DJ Lethal – turntables (on "Lookaway")
- Xavante people – percussion, chanting (on "Itsári")

=== Production staff ===
- Ross Robinson and Sepultura – production
- Chuck Johnson – engineering
- Richard Kaplan – engineering
- Rob Agnello – engineering
- Andy Wallace – mixing
- Steve Sisco – mixing and engineering
- George Marino – mastering

== Charts ==
=== Weekly charts ===
Chart (1996)	Peak position
Australian Albums (ARIA)	3
Austrian Albums (Ö3 Austria)	2
Belgian Albums (Ultratop Flanders)	5
Belgian Albums (Ultratop Wallonia)	3
Canada Top Albums/CDs (RPM)	22
Czech Albums (IFPI)	4
Danish Albums (Hitlisten)	34
Dutch Albums (Album Top 100)	6
Europe (European Top 100 Albums)	2
Finnish Albums (Suomen virallinen lista)	5
France Albums (SNEP)	4
German Albums (Offizielle Top 100)	7
Irish Albums (IRMA)	5
Italian Albums (Musica e Dischi)	5
New Zealand Albums (RMNZ)	8
Norwegian Albums (VG-lista)	8
Portuguese Albums (AFP)	8
Scottish Albums (Official Charts)	13
Spanish Albums (AFYVE)	18
Swedish Albums (Sverigetopplistan)	5
Swiss Albums (Schweizer Hitparade)	16
UK Albums (Official Charts)	4
UK Rock & Metal Albums (Official Charts)	1
US Billboard 200	27

Chart (2026)	Peak position
Hungarian Physical Albums (MAHASZ)	11
Hungarian Vinyl Albums (MAHASZ)	7

=== Year-end charts ===
Chart (1996)	Peak Position
Austrian Albums (Ö3 Austria)	35
Dutch Albums (Album Top 100)	66
Europe (European Top 100 Albums)	45
German Albums (Offizielle Top 100)	73

== Certifications ==
Region	Certification	Certified units/sales
Australia (ARIA)	Gold	35,000^{^}
Austria (IFPI Austria)	Gold	25,000^{*}
Canada (Music Canada)	Gold	50,000^{^}
France (SNEP)	Gold	100,000^{*}
Netherlands (NVPI)	Gold	50,000^{^}
Poland (ZPAV)	Gold	50,000^{*}
United Kingdom (BPI)	Gold	100,000^{^}
United States (RIAA)	Gold	500,000^{^}
^{*} Sales figures based on certification alone.^{^} Shipments figures based on certification alone.
