= Territory (song) =

1993 song by Sepultura

Single by Sepultura

from the album Chaos A.D.
- B-side: "Polícia" (Titãs cover); "Biotech Is Godzilla"
- Released: October 5, 1993
- Recorded: 1992; Rockfield Studios and; Chepstow Castle, South Wales, United Kingdom
- Genre: Groove metal; thrash metal
- Length: 4:47
- Label: Roadrunner
- Songwriters: Max Cavalera; Igor Cavalera; Andreas Kisser; Paulo Jr.
- Producer: Andy Wallace

Sepultura singles chronology
"Refuse/Resist" (1993)	"Territory" (1993)	"Slave New World" (1994)

"Territory" is a song by Brazilian heavy metal band Sepultura, released as the second of the three singles from the band's fifth studio album, Chaos A.D., released in 1993. Like most of the band's singles, the song is one of the band's best-known songs, and is a concert staple to this day.

The artwork for the single is not easily discernible. It depicts a monument of some sort. The image is overlaid with the band's thorned 'S' logo.

In a 2017 interview, co-songwriter Max Cavalera said that the song "was about all different territorial wars, from L.A. gangs like Crips and Bloods, to drug wars in Brazil, to the ongoing conflict between Israel and Palestine."

== Releases ==
"Territory" saw relatively few variations upon its release compared to the other singles from the album. The CD came in a standard slimline jewel case, rather than the usual digipak, and only one version was released. The single was also released as a 12" vinyl record, with only "Polícia" as a B-side.

== Music video ==
Filmed in Israel and Palestine around the time of the signing of the Oslo Accords, the music video for "Territory" represents the Israeli–Palestinian conflict. In the video, the band performs near the Dead Sea, becoming covered in mud. This is intercut with footage of armed Israeli soldiers and police, pro-Palestinian graffiti, band members drinking tea with Arabs, Bedouins, Haredim kissing the stones of the Western Wall, pages of the Qur'an and the Hebrew Bible, and Christian ceremonies in the Old City of Jerusalem. It ends with videos of a newspaper clipping of the signing of the Oslo Accords, a soldier, and the silhouette of the band standing in the sea.

The video, directed by Paul Rachman, was released to TV stations in October 1993. It won the International Viewer's Choice award for best video (Brazil) at the 1994 MTV Video Music Awards. In 1995 it was released on the VHS Third World Chaos, which was re-released on DVD in 2002 as part of Chaos DVD.

In 2019, Sepultura was denied entry to Lebanon, causing the group to cancel a scheduled performance in Beirut. Their entry was denied by Lebanese General Security, possibly due to the group previously having visited Israel during the production of the "Territory" music video. Under Lebanese visa policy, individuals who have visited Israel may be detained if they enter Lebanon. Organizers of the canceled event shared "we were told [by authorities] that the issue is delicate as it relates to insulting Christianity, that the band members are devil worshipers, that they held a concert in Israel, that they filmed a video clip supporting Israel"—accusations the promoter denied. In a statement, the band said: "In 35 years of history, it was the first time we had our entry blocked in a country by a false interpretation of our purposes and values since our intention has always been to promote unity and freedom of expression through music, without making any political, racial or religious distinction."

== Cover versions ==
- American metal band Between the Buried and Me recorded a cover of this song, which is on their 2006 cover album The Anatomy Of.
- French metal band Gojira covered "Territory" live during the tour promoting their 2016 album, Magma.

== Track listing ==
1. "Territory" (from the album Chaos A.D.)
2. "Polícia" (Titãs cover, also available on digipak and Brazilian pressings of Chaos A.D. and the compilation Blood-Rooted)
3. "Biotech Is Godzilla" (from the album Chaos A.D.)

== Personnel ==
- Max Cavalera – vocals, rhythm guitar
- Andreas Kisser – lead guitar
- Paulo Jr. – bass
- Igor Cavalera – drums
- Produced by Andy Wallace and Sepultura
- Recorded and engineered by Andy Wallace
- Mixed by Andy Wallace
- Assistant engineer: Simon Dawson

== Charts ==
Chart (1993)	Peak position
Australia (ARIA)	143
European Hot 100 Singles (Music & Media)	81
Finland (The Official Finnish Charts)	3
Greece Indie (Pop & Rock)	9
Ireland (IRMA)	8
New Zealand (Recorded Music NZ)	50
UK Singles (Official Charts)	66
UK Rock & Metal Singles (ERA)	5
