= Arise (Sepultura album) =

Studio album by Sepultura
- Released: March 25, 1991
- Recorded: 1990–1991
- Studios: Morrisound Recording, Tampa, Florida, U.S.
- Genres: Thrash metal; death metal
- Length: 42:26
- Label: Roadrunner
- Producers: Sepultura; Scott Burns

Sepultura chronology
Beneath the Remains (1989)	Arise (1991)	Chaos A.D. (1993)

Singles from Arise
- 1. "Arise" Released: 1991; 2. "Dead Embryonic Cells" Released: 1991; 3. "Under Siege (Regnum Irae)" Released: 1991

Arise is the fourth studio album by Brazilian heavy metal band Sepultura, released on March 25, 1991, by Roadrunner Records. Released after their breakthrough album, Beneath the Remains (1989), Arise represents the band's experiments with that album's death/thrash style as well as its progressive and technical abilities, and presents the band's first incursions with industrial music, hardcore punk and Latin percussion. Upon its release, it received widespread acclaim in the heavy metal press, and yielded multiple singles. The tour that supported the album was the group's longest at that time, totaling 220 shows in 39 countries from 1991–1992. During the touring, the album went gold in Indonesia, becoming the band's first music industry certification. By the tour's end, Arise had achieved platinum sales worldwide. According to Whiplash's Hagen Kennedy, Arise is widely considered Sepultura's greatest album, and a landmark not only in thrash metal but extreme metal as a whole. The album was inducted into Decibel magazine's "Hall of Fame", becoming the third Sepultura album to receive such award, the previous two being Roots and Beneath the Remains. This induction made Sepultura the first band to have at least three of their albums featured in the Decibel Hall of Fame. It is considered to be an essential release in the thrash genre by Revolver.

== Background ==
After the release of the third album, Beneath the Remains, Sepultura began to receive heavy attention in the international heavy metal scene and toured outside of the United States for the first time. They received additional attention for performances at the Rock in Rio II festival, and their heavily played video for the track "Inner Self". In the midst of this, the band moved to Phoenix, Arizona and acquired new management. In August 1990, the band travelled to Florida to work on the album. Scott Burns reprised his role as producer and audio engineer, and now with a major advantage: Sepultura were at his home studio, Morrisound, a studio properly equipped to record their music style. Their label Roadrunner granted a $40,000 budget, which helped explain the album's improved production values. That allowed drummer Igor Cavalera and Burns, for example, to spend a whole week just testing the drum kit's tunings and experimenting with microphone practice.

=== Musical style ===
Although lead guitarist Andreas Kisser stated that Arise "took a lot of the same direction" as their previous album, it was clear that their music was moving in a more experimental direction. Sepultura's usual breakneck pace became toned down a bit; drummer Igor Cavalera started using groove-laden rhythms. According to metal specialist Don Kaye, the album "represented the band taking their initial death/thrash sound to its logical conclusion." According to music journalist T Coles, "the grimy grunt of Max Cavalera gave them a particularly subterranean aesthetic."

Arise also found the band opening up to non-metal influences. Bands such as Einstürzende Neubauten, Nine Inch Nails, The Young Gods, and Ministry were already part of Sepultura's listening habits, and slight touches of industrial music can be traced through the use of samples and sound effects. A trademark of a later phase—Latin percussion and "tribal" drumming—made its first appearance on the song "Altered State". The band's old love for hardcore punk is evident on "Subtraction" and "Desperate Cry".

== Release ==
Released on March 25, 1991, and April 8 in the United Kingdom, Arise was the first Sepultura record to enter the Billboard charts, at number 145, before peaking at 119. It was also the first to gain a music certification—Arise went gold in 1992 for selling 25,000 copies in Indonesia. By 1993, the album had sold 1 million units around the globe. In 2001, it won a second certification: silver in the United Kingdom, for selling in excess of 60,000 copies.

The album was accompanied by three singles: The title track, "Dead Embryonic Cells", and "Under Siege (Regnum Irae)". Though the title track was banned in American by MTV due to its apocalyptic religious imagery, "Dead Embryonic Cells" would enjoy airplay on Headbanger's Ball. A remastered version of Arise was released by Roadrunner in 1997, with added notes by music critic Don Kaye and four bonus tracks, previously released on the compilation The Roots Of Sepultura: a cover version of Motörhead's "Orgasmatron", a rough mix of "Desperate Cry" and two previously unreleased songs. A previously unavailable photo shoot from the Arise period was also included in the expanded CD booklet.

=== Touring ===
Just one day after finishing the recording of Arise, the band embarked on a small headlining tour with extreme metallers Obituary and Sadus. That was the start of the longest promotional tour of Sepultura's career, a worldwide affair that would span two full years. In January 1991, they were invited to play for at the Brazilian music festival Rock in Rio 2 where their performance was watched by a 70,000-strong crowd. Before heading out of Brazil on a mid-1991 European tour, Sepultura performed one more concert in São Paulo, the country's largest city. It took place at Praça Charles Miller (in front of Estádio do Pacaembu), on May 11. Local military police expected 10,000 to attend. 30,000 showed up instead, making crowd management nearly impossible. Six people were hurt, 18 were arrested and one was murdered with an axe. A week before, a young man was stabbed to death at a Ramones concert in São Paulo, during a brawl between headbangers and skinheads. These events were followed by a huge mainstream media backlash throughout the country against rock music. Sepultura's three-month tour with thrash metal groups Sacred Reich and Heathen was a critical success. For the first time they appeared on the cover of best-selling British heavy metal magazine Kerrang! and major pop weeklies such as Melody Maker and NME published long feature articles on the group. While in Spain Sepultura recorded their Under Siege video, which included their Barcelona concert and interview footage with all four members of the band. After Europe, they embarked on the North American tour New Titans on the Block with Napalm Death, Sick of It All and Sacred Reich. Max Cavalera has recalled that, before signing on to the New Titans on the Block tour, Sepultura was supposed to be the opening act for the Clash of the Titans tour featuring Megadeth, Slayer and Anthrax, but they "got kicked out" and were replaced by Alice in Chains. Sepultura wrapped up the year doing a brief German tour with Motörhead and Morbid Angel in December. Sepultura then managed to secure a slot in two of the most sought after rock tours of 1992. The first tour was with ex-Black Sabbath singer Ozzy Osbourne, who was promoting his multi-platinum solo album No More Tears. The second tour was with industrial metal stalwarts Ministry and influential alternative metal/noise rock unit Helmet. Both of these American acts had just released the most successful records of their careers – Psalm 69 and Meantime.

== Reception ==
Professional ratings
Review scores
Source	Rating
AllMusic	4.5/5 stars
Collector's Guide to Heavy Metal	9/10
Kerrang!	5/5 stars
Q	4/5 stars
Select	5/5 medals

Arise garnered praise from a wide variety of sources. By the time of its release, major Brazilian newspapers were already aware of the band's existence, and advance copies sent to them were generally met with positive reviews. Artur G. Couto Duarte, writing for O Estado de Minas, described Sepultura's soundscapes as "stories describing barren worlds where disease, hunger, torture and death reign supreme". Folha de S.Paulo's Sérgio Sá Leitão pointed out Sepultura's increasing compositional skills, drawing attention to how the band's occasional use of restraint benefited their songs as a whole.

The international pop press also took notice of Brazil's premiere metal group. Top British weeklies such as the Melody Maker and NME wrote lengthy articles on the band, praising them. A Melody Maker journalist wrote: "Sepultura is [...] a Brazilian metal band which seems to be in the verge of getting big – maybe even bigger than Slayer, their only true rival." Genre-specific magazines also reacted positively to the group. Germany's Thrash elected Sepultura the best band in the world, defeating major contenders Metallica and Slayer. Sepultura were also prominently featured on the biggest metal publications of the time, such as Kerrang!, Rock Hard and Metal Forces. Select gave the album a five out of five rating, referring to it as a "a classic example of rock music as pure cathartic release" and that "few metal LPs released this year, if any, will triumph over Arise."

Throughout the years, Arise has been continuously praised by the music press, not only as a landmark release of Sepultura's career, but of extreme metal in general. In November 1996, Q magazine stated that "Arise remains their thrash high water mark, sounding like an angry man throwing tools at a urinal while reading the Book of Revelations [sic]." AllMusic contributor Eduardo Rivadavia considered Arise as "a classic of the death metal genre." The album also appeared in the book 1001 Albums You Must Hear Before You Die (2006), edited by writer Robert Dimery. In January 2016, 25 years since the album's release, Arise was inducted into Decibel magazine's "Hall of Fame", becoming the third Sepultura album to receive such award, the previous two being Roots and Beneath the Remains. This induction made Sepultura the first band to have at least three of their albums featured in the Decibel Hall of Fame. Decibel would further go on to proclaim Arise as the greatest album of 1991. Adam McCann of Metal Digest noted: "The band had created a monster with their previous album Beneath the Remains, but Arise was the album which broke them through to the big mainstream MTV era with tracks like 'Dead Embryonic Cells', 'Desperate Cry' and the title track which would lay the foundation for Sepultura's mid 90's success with the band poised to conquer the world. Many people regard Arise as the bands last truly great album."

== Track listing ==
All music is composed by Sepultura, except where noted.

No.	Title	Lyrics	Length
1.	"Arise"	Max Cavalera	3:18
2.	"Dead Embryonic Cells"	Cavalera	4:52
3.	"Desperate Cry"	Andreas Kisser	6:40
4.	"Murder"	Cavalera	3:26
5.	"Subtraction"	Kisser	4:46
6.	"Altered State"	Kisser	6:34
7.	"Under Siege (Regnum Irae)"	Cavalera	4:52
8.	"Meaningless Movements"	Kisser	4:40
9.	"Infected Voice"	Kisser	3:18
Total length:			42:26

Bonus track (Japanese and Brazilian edition)
No.	Title	Writer(s)	Length
10.	"Orgasmatron" (Motörhead cover)	Lemmy Kilmister; Michael Burston; Pete Gill; Phil Campbell	4:15

1997 remaster
No.	Title	Lyrics	Length
11.	"Intro"	(instrumental)	1:32
12.	"C.I.U. (Criminals in Uniform)"	Katherine Ludwig Moses	4:17
13.	"Desperate Cry (Scott Burns mix)"	Kisser	6:43

== Personnel ==
Sepultura

- Max Cavalera – lead vocals, rhythm guitar
- Igor Cavalera – drums, percussion
- Andreas Kisser – lead guitar, backing vocals, bass (uncredited)
- Paulo Jr. – bass (credited, but did not perform)

Production

- Sepultura – production
- Scott Burns – production, engineering, lyrical and translation assistance
- Andy Wallace – mixing
- Fletcher McLean – assistant engineering, lyrical and translation assistance
- Steve Sisco – assistant mix engineering
- Howie Weinberg – mastering
- Henrique Portugal – synthesizers
- Kent Smith – sound effect creation
- Michael Whelan – cover illustration ("Arise")
- Tim Hubbard – photography
- Patricia Mooney – art direction
- Don Kaye – liner notes
- Carole Segal – photography
- Alex Solca – photography
- Shaun Clark – photography
- Rui Mendes – photography
- Bozo – tribal "S" logo

== Charts ==
Chart (1991)	Peak position
Dutch Albums (Album Top 100)	68
Finnish Albums (The Official Finnish Charts)	14
German Albums (Offizielle Top 100)	25
Swedish Albums (Sverigetopplistan)	46
Swiss Albums (Schweizer Hitparade)	24
UK Albums (Official Charts)	40
US Billboard 200	119

Chart (2026)	Peak position
Hungarian Physical Albums (MAHASZ)	9

== Certifications ==
Region	Certification	Certified units/sales
United Kingdom (BPI)	Silver	60,000^{^}
^{^} Shipments figures based on certification alone.
