= Final Conflict =

American hardcore punk band

- Origin: Long Beach, California, U.S.
- Genres: Hardcore punk, crossover thrash
- Years active: 1983–present
- Labels: Tankcrimes, Relapse, Pusmort, Nemesis, Bacteria Sour, Tacklebox/Cargo
- Members: Ron Martinez; Jeff Harp; Nick Manning; Anthony Robles
- Past members: Johnny Daniels; Jeff Lennert; Rob Justice; Warren Renfrow; Adam Zuckert; Travis Laws; James Scoggins; Dale Dang; David Phillips; Ron Avila; Anthony Guarino; Mark David; John Haddad; Steve Shears; Rick Kurtz; Calum Mackenzie; Eric Fauver
- Website: Final Conflict on Facebook

Final Conflict is an American hardcore punk band from Long Beach, California, formed in 1983. Their first album was Ashes to Ashes, released in 1988. Over the years they went through various lineup changes; as of 2009, the only original member remaining was guitar player Jeff Harp. Another long-time member was vocalist Ron Martinez.

Final Conflict is regarded as one of the first extreme hardcore punk bands from Southern California. They incorporated a British-style hardcore punk rock at a time when the punk rock scene was at its weakest popularity. Their perseverance and dedicated fan base helped spark a Los Angeles and Orange County punk rock revival of sorts during the late 1980s and early 1990s. Final Conflict have stayed active and relevant through the years touring and releasing new material. In 2013 Final Conflict reunited 3/4 of the "Ashes to Ashes" lineup for the Chaos in Tejas Festival in Austin TX and Maryland Death Fest in Baltimore 2014.

Currently the band's lineup includes 1/2 of the original 1987 "Ashes to Ashes" lineup. Ron Martinez (vocals), Jeff Harp (guitar), Anthony Robles (bass) and Nick Manning (drums) and have consistently played with this lineup since 2016.

== Discography ==
=== Albums ===
- Ashes to Ashes – LP (1988)
- Discharged – From Home Front to War Front – EP Compilation (1991)
- The American Scream – EP 7" (1992)
- V/A Strange Notes – A Germs Cover Compilation – CD (1996)
- Face Extinction – EP 7" (1997)
- INSTITUTION – EP 7" (1997)
- Split with "No Reason" – EP Split 7" (1997)
- Rebirth – LP (1997)
- Final Conflict – EP 7" (1997)
- No Peace on Earth, No Rest in Hell – LP (2006)
- V/A What Are We Fighting For? – A Dead Kennedys Tribute Album – CD (2007)
- "Nineteen Eighty-Five Demo" – LP (2013)
- "Ashes to Ashes" – LP + 2xCD (includes 1985 demo) reissue (2014)
