= Blood-Rooted =

Compilation album by Sepultura
- Released: June 3, 1997
- Recorded: 1991–1996
- Genres: Groove metal; thrash metal; death metal; alternative metal; crossover thrash
- Length: 64:21
- Label: Roadrunner
- Producers: Sepultura; Andy Wallace; Paulo Junqueiro; Ross Robinson; DJ Lethal

Sepultura chronology
The Roots of Sepultura (1996)	Blood-Rooted (1997)	Against (1998)

Professional ratings
Review scores
Source	Rating
AllMusic	link
NME	6/10

Blood-Rooted is an album by Brazilian metal band Sepultura, released on June 3, 1997. It was a collection of unreleased tracks, B-sides, remixes, and live recordings. It was also the last officially recognised Sepultura album featuring original singer Max Cavalera, who left in December 1996 amid a management dispute. Cavalera was replaced by American singer Derrick Green in 1997.

Tracks 1–6 and 11 are cover songs.

== Track listing ==
All tracks by Sepultura except the covers.

No.	Title	Length
1.	"Procreation (of the Wicked)" (Celtic Frost cover)	3:38
2.	"Inhuman Nature" (Final Conflict cover)	3:10
3.	"Polícia" (Titãs cover)	1:46
4.	"War" (Bob Marley cover)	6:38
5.	"Crucificados Pelo Sistema" (Ratos de Porão cover)	1:03
6.	"Symptom of the Universe" (Black Sabbath cover)	4:14
7.	"Mine" (featuring Mike Patton)	6:20
8.	"Lookaway (Master Vibe mix)" (featuring Mike Patton and Jonathan Davis)	5:35
9.	"Dusted (demo version)"	4:26
10.	"Roots Bloody Roots (demo version)"	3:30
11.	"Drug Me" (Dead Kennedys cover)	1:53
12.	"Refuse/Resist (live)"	3:50
13.	"Slave New World (live)"	3:05
14.	"Propaganda (live)"	3:25
15.	"Beneath the Remains / Escape to the Void (live)"	3:48
16.	"Kaiowas (live)"	2:18
17.	"Clenched Fist (live)"	3:37
18.	"Biotech Is Godzilla (live)"	2:07

== Credits ==
- Martin Eric Ain – composer
- Carlton "Carly" Barrett – composer
- Toni Bellotto – composer
- Jello Biafra – composer
- Black Sabbath – composer
- Scott Burns – mixing
- Geezer Butler – composer
- Igor Cavalera – drums, percussion, producer
- Max Cavalera – guitar, photography, producer, vocals
- George Chin – photography
- Jonathan Davis – composer, guest artist, vocals
- DJ Lethal – composer, producer
- Michael Grecco – photography
- Tony Iommi – composer
- Paulo Junqueiro – producer
- Andreas Kisser – guitar, producer
- Jim Lockyer – engineer
- Rob Martinez – composer
- Alex Newport – mixing
- Ozzy Osbourne – composer
- Mike Patton – composer, guest artist, vocals
- Paulo Jr. – bass, producer
- Steven Remote – recording engineer
- Ross Robinson – mixing, producer
- Sepultura – composer, primary artist, producer
- Andy Wallace – mixing, producer
- Bill Ward – composer
- Thomas Gabriel Warrior – composer

== Charts ==
Chart (1997)	Peak position
UK Rock & Metal Albums (Official Charts)	12
US Billboard 200	162
