= Dead Embryonic Cells =

Single by Sepultura

from the album Arise
- B-side: "Orgasmatron" (Motörhead cover); "Troops of Doom" (new version)
- Released: 1991
- Recorded: 1990–1991 at Morrisound Recording in Tampa, Florida
- Genre: Thrash metal; death metal
- Length: 4:52
- Label: Roadrunner
- Songwriters: Max Cavalera; Igor Cavalera; Andreas Kisser; Paulo Jr.
- Producer: Scott Burns

Sepultura singles chronology
| "Arise" (1991) | "Dead Embryonic Cells" (1991) | "Under Siege (Regnum Irae)" (1991) |

"Dead Embryonic Cells" is Sepultura's second single, as well as the second of three to be released from the album Arise. A music video for the song was produced and can be found on the VHS release Third World Chaos, which itself was released on DVD as part of Chaos DVD. The video features footage of the band performing in the wilderness accompanied by imagery from the album.

At this stage in their career, the band had recorded little material to be used as B-sides, which is why the Arise singles are so similar. This single and the next, "Under Siege (Regnum Irae)" have exactly the same artwork (a detail of the Arise album cover artwork by Michael Whelan) and B-sides.

The song appears on the Liberty City Hardcore station in both Grand Theft Auto IV: The Lost and Damned and Grand Theft Auto: The Ballad of Gay Tony. The station notably features Max Cavalera as the radio DJ.

== Track listing ==
1. "Dead Embryonic Cells" (album version)
2. "Orgasmatron" (Motörhead cover)
3. "Troops of Doom" (This is the re-recorded version of the song which originally appeared on the album Morbid Visions.)

== Personnel ==
- Max Cavalera – lead vocals, rhythm guitar
- Igor Cavalera – drums
- Andreas Kisser – lead guitar, bass (uncredited)
- Paulo Jr. – bass (credited, but did not perform)
- Produced by Scott Burns and Sepultura
- Recorded and engineered by Scott Burns
- Mixed by Andy Wallace
- Assistant engineers: Fletcher McClean and Steve Sisco
