= Andy Wallace (producer) =

American record producer (born 1947)

Andy Wallace (born 1947) is an American record producer and audio and mixing engineer. Over the years, he focused exclusively on mixing. Wallace is described as "legendary" in the recording industry and has worked on many best-selling and influential records, mainly in heavy metal, alternative rock, grunge and other styles of rock and roll, including with Nirvana, Linkin Park, System of a Down, Slayer, Avenged Sevenfold, Sepultura, Jeff Buckley, and Ghost. Wallace won a Grammy for his work on The Globe Sessions (1999) by Sheryl Crow.

== Career ==
Wallace was born in New Jersey. From the 1970s he worked as a musician, playing bass guitar and singing backup vocals; his favorite music as a performer was "old R&B" inspired by Stax Records and Little Richard. He began his recording career as a chief engineer in his own studio in Los Angeles. After a few years of moderate success, he returned to New York City during the emergence of hip-hop in the early 1980s.

Following the breakout success of the 1986 production of the Run-DMC–Aerosmith collaboration on "Walk This Way" with Rick Rubin, Wallace went on to work with The Cult, Slayer, Prince, Bruce Springsteen, Sepultura, Nirvana, Jeff Buckley, Sonic Youth, Rage Against the Machine, Guns N' Roses, Linkin Park, Paul McCartney, Avenged Sevenfold, and many others.

In February 1999, Wallace shared a Grammy Award for Best Engineered Album, Non-Classical with Tchad Blake and Trina Shoemaker, for their work on Sheryl Crow's album The Globe Sessions.

As of May 2021, over 120 million album units had been sold worldwide that contained a credit to Wallace.

== Discography (selection) ==
e = engineered; m = mixed; p = produced

1983:

- Mtume – Juicy Fruit [e]

1986:

- Afrika Bambaataa – Planet Rock: The Album [m]
- Run-D.M.C. – Raising Hell [e/m]
- Slayer – Reign in Blood [e/m]

1987:

- The Cult – Electric [e/m]

1988:

- Slayer – South of Heaven [e/m]

1989:

- The Front – The Front [p/e/m]
- New Model Army – Thunder and Consolation [m]
- The Godfathers – More Songs About Love & Hate [m]

1990:

- Slayer – Seasons in the Abyss [p/m]

1991:

- Radio Active Cats – Radio Active Cats [p/e/m]
- Sepultura – Arise [m]
- Head Candy – Starcaster (Head Candy album) [m]
- Fear Of God – Within the Veil [m]
- Nirvana – Nevermind [m]

1992:

- The Rollins Band – The End of Silence [p]
- White Zombie – La Sexorcisto: Devil Music Volume One [p/e/m]
- Sonic Youth – Dirty [m]
- Helmet – Meantime [m]
- Rage Against the Machine – Rage Against the Machine [m]
- Ned's Atomic Dustbin – Are You Normal? [p/e/m]
- Nirvana – Hormoaning [m] (2, 5)
- Screaming Trees – Sweet Oblivion [m]

1993:

- Galactic Cowboys – Space in Your Face [m]
- Fishbone – Give a Monkey a Brain and He'll Swear He's the Center of the Universe [m]
- Sepultura – Chaos A.D. [p/m]

1994:

- Toadies – Rubberneck [m]
- Bad Religion – Stranger Than Fiction [p/m]
- Helmet – Betty [m]
- Jeff Buckley – Grace [p/e/m]
- Shudder To Think – Pony Express Record [m]
- Big Head Todd & The Monsters – Strategem [m]

1995:

- Faith No More – King for a Day... Fool for a Lifetime [p/m]
- Blind Melon – Soup [p/e/m]
- Rancid – ...And Out Come the Wolves [m]
- Seaweed – Spanaway [m]
- Front 242 – 06:21:03:11 Up Evil [m]

1996:

- Sepultura – Roots [m]
- Nirvana – From the Muddy Banks of the Wishkah [m]
- Rage Against the Machine – Evil Empire [m]
- Rush – Test for Echo [m]
- Screaming Trees - Dust [m]
- Sense Field – Building [m]

1997:

- Silverchair – Freak Show [m]
- Everclear – So Much for the Afterglow [m]
- Ben Folds Five – Whatever and Ever Amen [m]
- The Misfits – American Psycho [m]
- Limp Bizkit – Three Dollar Bill, Y'all [m]

1998:

- Soulfly – Soulfly [m]
- Phish – The Story of the Ghost [p/m]

1999:

- Bernard Butler – Friends and Lovers [m]
- Atari Teenage Riot – 60 Second Wipeout [m]
- Feeder – Yesterday Went Too Soon [m]
- Tonic – Sugar [m]
- Foo Fighters – There Is Nothing Left to Lose [m] (3, 6, 7)
- Sevendust – Home [m]
- Skunk Anansie – Post Orgasmic Chill [p/m]
- Luscious Jackson – Electric Honey [m]

2000:

- Disturbed – The Sickness [m]
- The Mighty Mighty Bosstones – Pay Attention [m]
- Mudvayne – L.D. 50 [m]
- Soulfly – Primitive [m]
- Limp Bizkit – Chocolate Starfish and the Hot Dog Flavored Water [p/m]
- Linkin Park – Hybrid Theory [m]
- Ultraspank – Progress [m]
- At the Drive-In – Relationship of Command [m]

2001:

- Toadies – Hell Below / Stars Above [m]
- Staind – Break the Cycle [m]
- System of a Down – Toxicity [m]
- Slipknot – Iowa [m]
- Stereophonics – Just Enough Education to Perform [m]
- Natalie Imbruglia – White Lilies Island [m]
- Oleander – Unwind [m]
- Systematic – Somewhere in Between [m]
- Fenix TX – Lechuza [m]
- Powerman 5000 – Anyone for Doomsday? [m]
- Puddle of Mudd – Come Clean [m]

2002:

- System of a Down – Steal This Album! [m]
- Trapt – Trapt [m]
- Disturbed – Believe [m]
- Taproot – Welcome [m]
- Pacifier – Pacifier [m] (1, 4, 8)
- Trust Company – The Lonely Position of Neutral [m]
- Chevelle – Wonder What's Next [m]
- Earshot – Letting Go [m]
- Korn – Untouchables [m]

2003:

- Staind – 14 Shades of Grey [m]
- The Distillers – Coral Fang [m]
- Fuel – Natural Selection [m]
- Pete Yorn – Day I Forgot [m]
- Rooney – Rooney [m]
- Linkin Park – Meteora [m]
- Thrice – The Artist in the Ambulance [m]
- Revis – Places for Breathing [m] (1, 4)
- A Perfect Circle – Thirteenth Step [m]
- Blink-182 – Blink-182 [m] (4, 5, 8, 11)

2004:

- Chevelle – This Type of Thinking (Could Do Us In) [m]
- Sum 41 – Chuck [m] (1, 4, 7–11, 13)
- Patti Smith – Trampin' [e]
- System of a Down – Mezmerize [m]
- System of a Down – Hypnotize [m]
- Rise Against – Siren Song Of The Counter Culture [m]

2005:

- LCD Soundsystem – LCD Soundsystem [m]
- Avenged Sevenfold – City of Evil [m]
- 3 Doors Down – Seventeen Days [m]
- Coheed and Cambria – Good Apollo, I'm Burning Star IV, Volume One: From Fear Through the Eyes of Madness [m]

2006:

- The Strokes – First Impressions of Earth [m]
- Dashboard Confessional – Dusk and Summer [m]
- Kasabian – Empire [m]
- Elefant – The Black Magic Show [m]
- From First to Last – Heroine [m]

2007:

- Biffy Clyro – Puzzle [m]
- Good Charlotte – Good Morning Revival [e/m]
- Avenged Sevenfold – Avenged Sevenfold [m]
- Paul McCartney – Memory Almost Full (2007) m
- Atreyu – Lead Sails Paper Anchor [m]
- The Cribs – Men's Needs, Women's Needs, Whatever [m]
- Kelly Clarkson – My December [m]
- Airbourne – Runnin' Wild [m]

2008:

- 3 Doors Down – 3 Doors Down [m]
- Shiny Toy Guns – Season of Poison [m]
- Kaiser Chiefs – Off With Their Heads [m]
- Guns N' Roses – Chinese Democracy [m]
- Coldplay – Viva la Vida or Death and All His Friends [m]
- Plain White T's – Big Bad World [m]

2009:

- Gallows – Grey Britain [m]
- Relient K – Forget and Not Slow Down [m]
- Biffy Clyro – Only Revolutions [m]

2010:

- Kashmir – Trespassers [p]
- Avenged Sevenfold – Nightmare [m]

2011:

- Portugal. The Man – In The Mountain, In The Cloud [m]
- Dream Theater – A Dramatic Turn of Events [m]
- X Japan – "Jade" [m]
- Blink-182 – "Natives" from Neighborhoods [m]

2013:

- The Joy Formidable – Wolf's Law [m]
- Skillet* - Rise [m]
- Avenged Sevenfold – Hail to the King [m]

2014:

- Linkin Park – The Hunting Party [m]

2015:

- Ghost – Meliora [m]

2016:

- A Day to Remember – Bad Vibrations [m]
- Avenged Sevenfold – The Stage [m]

2018:

- The Voidz – Virtue (The Voidz album) [m]
- Ghost – Prequelle [m]

2021:

- Gojira – Fortitude [m]

2022:

- Ghost – Impera [m]

2023:

- Avenged Sevenfold – Life Is But a Dream... [m]

2025:

- Ghost – Skeletá [m]

== Awards and nominations ==
=== Grammy Awards ===
Year	Nominee / work	Award	Result	Ref.
1994	Rage Against the Machine	Best Engineered Album, Non-Classical	Nominated	
1999	The Globe Sessions	Best Engineered Album, Non-Classical	Won	
1999	The Globe Sessions	Album of the Year	Nominated	
2003	C'mon, C'mon	Best Engineered Album, Non-Classical	Nominated	
2004	Natural Selection	Best Engineered Album, Non-Classical	Nominated	
2006	Daft Punk Is Playing at My House	Best Dance Recording	Nominated	
2009	Viva la Vida or Death and All His Friends	Album of the Year	Nominated	
