= Igor Cavalera =

Brazilian drummer

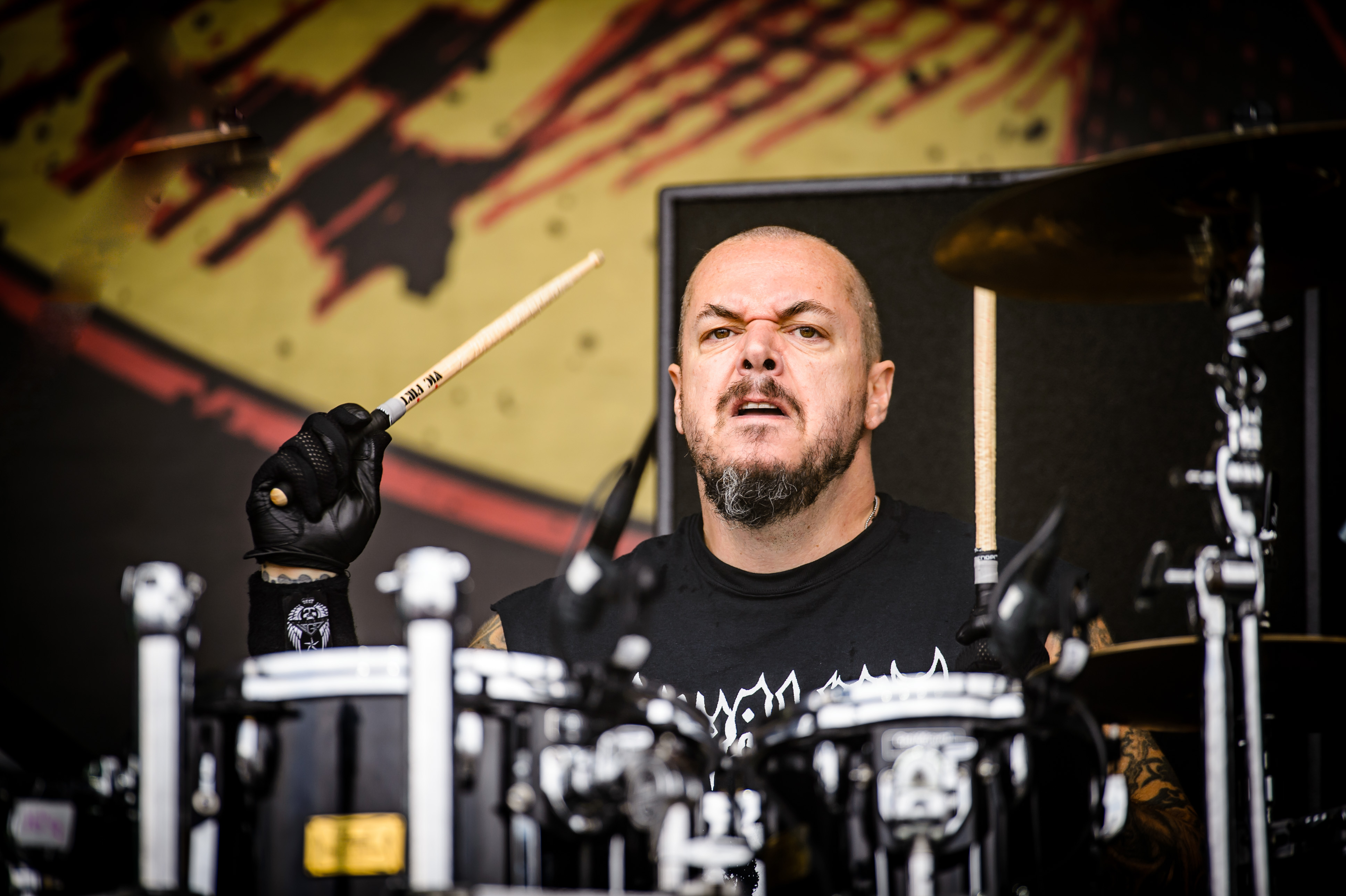
- Cavalera at Wacken Open Air 2017

Background information
- Also known as: Igor Skullcrusher; Iggor Cavalera; El Covero
- Born: Igor Graziano Cavalera; 4 September 1970 (age 56); Belo Horizonte, Minas Gerais, Brazil
- Genres: Groove metal; thrash metal; death metal; alternative metal; hip-hop; electronic; experimental
- Occupation: Musician
- Instrument: Drums
- Years active: 1984–present
- Member of: Cavalera Conspiracy; Soulwax
- Formerly of: Sepultura

Igor Graziano Cavalera (born 4 September 1970) is a Brazilian musician, best known as the former drummer for the heavy metal band Sepultura, which he co-founded with his brother Max in 1984. Max left the band in 1996, and Igor himself would depart nearly ten years later, making him the last original member of Sepultura to leave the band. The brothers have since reunited in the band Cavalera Conspiracy.

He has played in the bands Nailbomb and Strife. As his hip-hop influences grew stronger, he began to DJ. Cavalera is one half of DJ duo Mixhell, a project he founded with his wife Laima Leyton.

In 2016, Soulwax introduced a new live show entitled "Soulwax Transient Program for Drums and Machinery", for which the new line up included Cavalera as one of three drummers (along with Victoria Smith and Blake Davies) as well as Igor's wife Laima Leyton (of Mixhell) on synths and backing vocals. This live show was the basis for their album From Deewee, released March 24. Cavalera has remained an official member of Soulwax since then.

== Biography ==
Cavalera started playing drums at around seven years old. He was into samba music as a child but, after seeing Queen live in 1981 along with his older brother Max, he started listening to rock music. When Sepultura was formed, Cavalera was the youngest member at the age of 13, his brother Max was 14 at the time. Sepultura was a big success and gave Cavalera an early start. On 21 April 1984, Cavalera played, for the first time, on a real drum kit, which was borrowed from Helinho of the band Overdose, that also played that night.

After the band split with his brother Max (lead vocals/rhythm guitar) in December 1996, their relationship underwent a crisis. In recent times their relationship has improved. Cavalera joined Max's current band Soulfly on stage at the 2006 tenth annual D-Low Memorial Show, to play the Sepultura songs "Roots Bloody Roots" and "Attitude". It was the first time the brothers had played together in ten years.

Cavalera is credited as having made a guest appearance on Biohazard's 2001 release Uncivilization on the track "Gone". He also served as a live musician for parodic heavy metal band Massacration under the pseudonym "El Covero" throughout 2004.

In 2006, with the release of Dante XXI, he began spelling his name "Iggor", preferring the way it looks. On 13 January 2006, it was announced that he was taking a break from the band due to the birth of his fourth child, initially leaving Sepultura temporarily. He later announced that he was quitting Sepultura due to "artistic incompatibility". Sepultura replaced him with Jean Dolabella.

Cavalera was scheduled to collaborate with underground hip-hop artist Necro on a project described by Necro as in the style of "old-school '80s thrash/death metal". However, Necro mentioned later that the project will not go ahead.

In 2008 Cavalera released the album Inflikted together with his brother Max in a project named Cavalera Conspiracy.

In 2012, Cavalera performed drums for the entire Strife album Witness a Rebirth, released via 6131 Records. In 2017, he played drums for Soulwax on their album From Deewee and in their live tour, along with two other live drummers.

In 2018, he formed the noise music duo Pet Brick with Wayne Adams of Big Lad and Death Pedals.

== Playing style ==
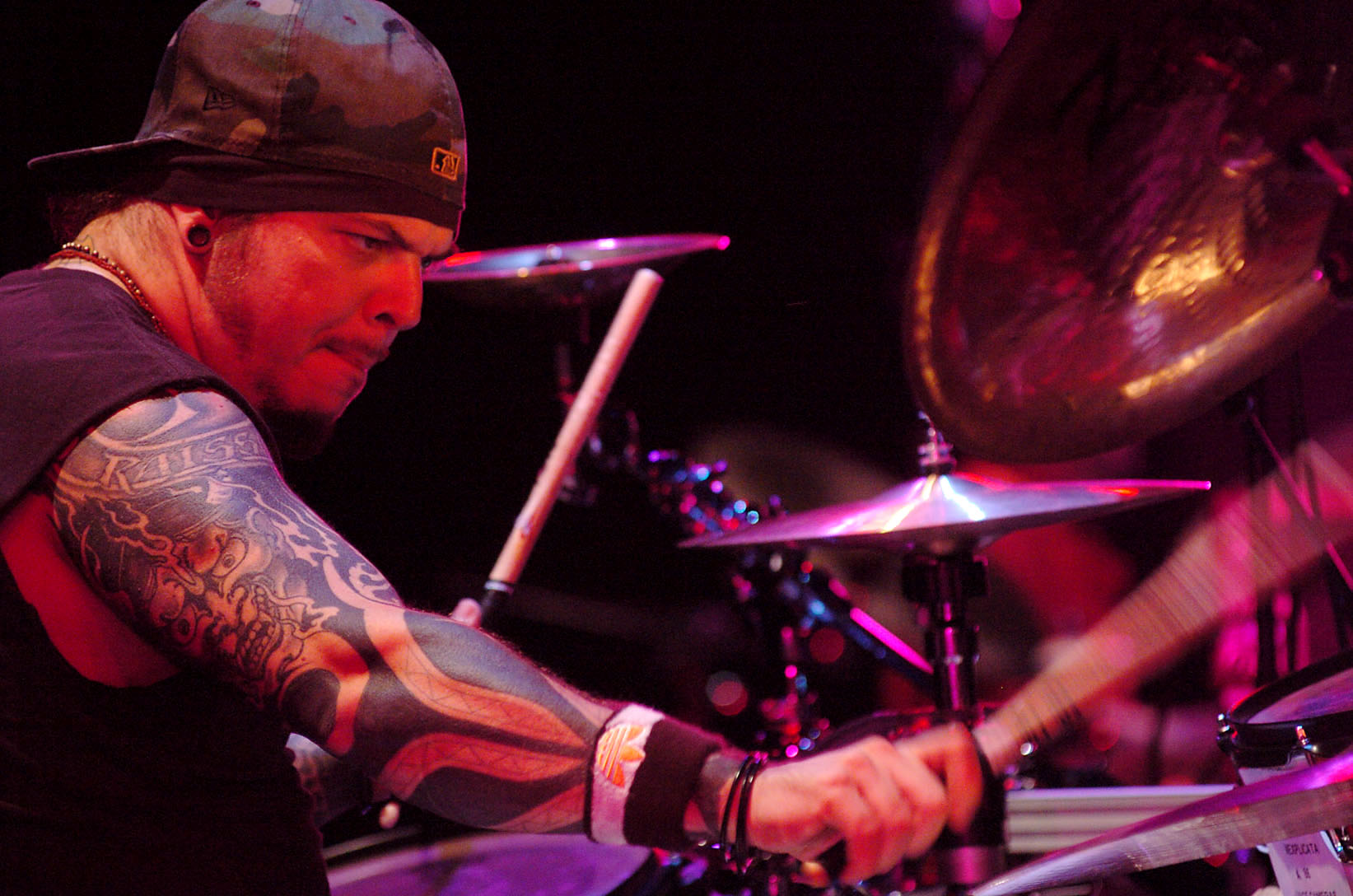
Cavalera in São Paulo, 2006

Cavalera cites Roger Taylor, Bill Ward, Dave Lombardo, Stewart Copeland and Mike Bordin among his major influences.

In the early Sepultura albums his drumming was loud and fast, following the thrash metal style of the 1980s. He mastered this style by 1987–1991 (with Schizophrenia, Beneath the Remains and Arise). His innovative style in the album Chaos A.D. brought tribal elements into the songs. One example of his contribution is the introduction of the song "Territory" (1993, Chaos A.D.). He further developed this style in the 1996 Roots album, adding more tribal elements to Sepultura's music.

Throughout his career, Cavalera has been widely recognized as a hard-hitting drummer (acknowledged by producer Scott Burns during the recording of Beneath the Remains). In later years, Cavalera adopted a drum set configuration with upright toms and fewer cymbals, as seen in Live in São Paulo. In reference to his work on the Sepultura album Nation, AllMusic wrote "Drummer Igor Cavalera's timing and tempo couldn't be more perfect as the adrenaline heightens until the album's intensity burns right through the speakers."

== Personal life ==
Cavalera has four children, born in 1996, 2000, 2002 and 2006. He has lived in London since 2013.

Cavalera collects toys and football shirts and has many hobbies, including Brazilian jiu-jitsu, kickboxing, snowboarding, surfing, drawing and supporting Brazilian football club Palmeiras. He admires his father Graziano Cavalera as his role model. In 1996, he started the fashion label "Cavalera". His fashion label has faced controversy of its use of the Albanian flag as its logo. In 2020, a petition called for "Cavalera" to change it.

On July 5, 2023, Cavalera’s brother Max announced that their mother Vania had died.

== Discography ==
=== Sepultura ===
- Bestial Devastation (1985)
- Morbid Visions (1986)
- Schizophrenia (1987)
- Beneath the Remains (1989)
- Arise (1991)
- Chaos A.D. (1993)
- Roots (1996)
- Against (1998)
- Nation (2001)
- Roorback (2003)
- Dante XXI (2006)

=== Cavalera Conspiracy ===
- Inflikted (2008)
- Blunt Force Trauma (2011)
- Pandemonium (2014)
- Psychosis (2017)
- Bestial Devastation (Re-Recorded) EP (2023)
- Morbid Visions (Re-Recorded) (2023)
- Schizophrenia (Re-Recorded) (2024)

=== Absent in Body ===
- Plague God (2022)

=== Petbrick ===
- I (2019)
- I Remixes (2020)
- Deafbrick (collaborative album with Deafkids, 2020)
- Liminal (2022)

=== Soulwax ===
- From Deewee (2017)

=== Self ===
Iggor Cavalera / Shane Embury - Neon gods / Own your darkness split EP Cold Spring Records

=== Guest appearances ===
- Titãs – Domingo on "Brasileiro" (1995)
- Pavilhão 9 – Cadeia Nacional on "Mandando Bronca" (1997)
- Soulwax – Belgica soundtrack – drums with Burning Phlegm (2016)
- Ladytron – Ladytron (2019)
- Pig Destroyer – The Octagonal Stairway (2020)
- Crizin da Z.O. – "O Fim Um" (2024)
- Merzbow, Bernocchi, Cavalera – Nocturnal Rainforest (2025)
