= List of Sepultura members =

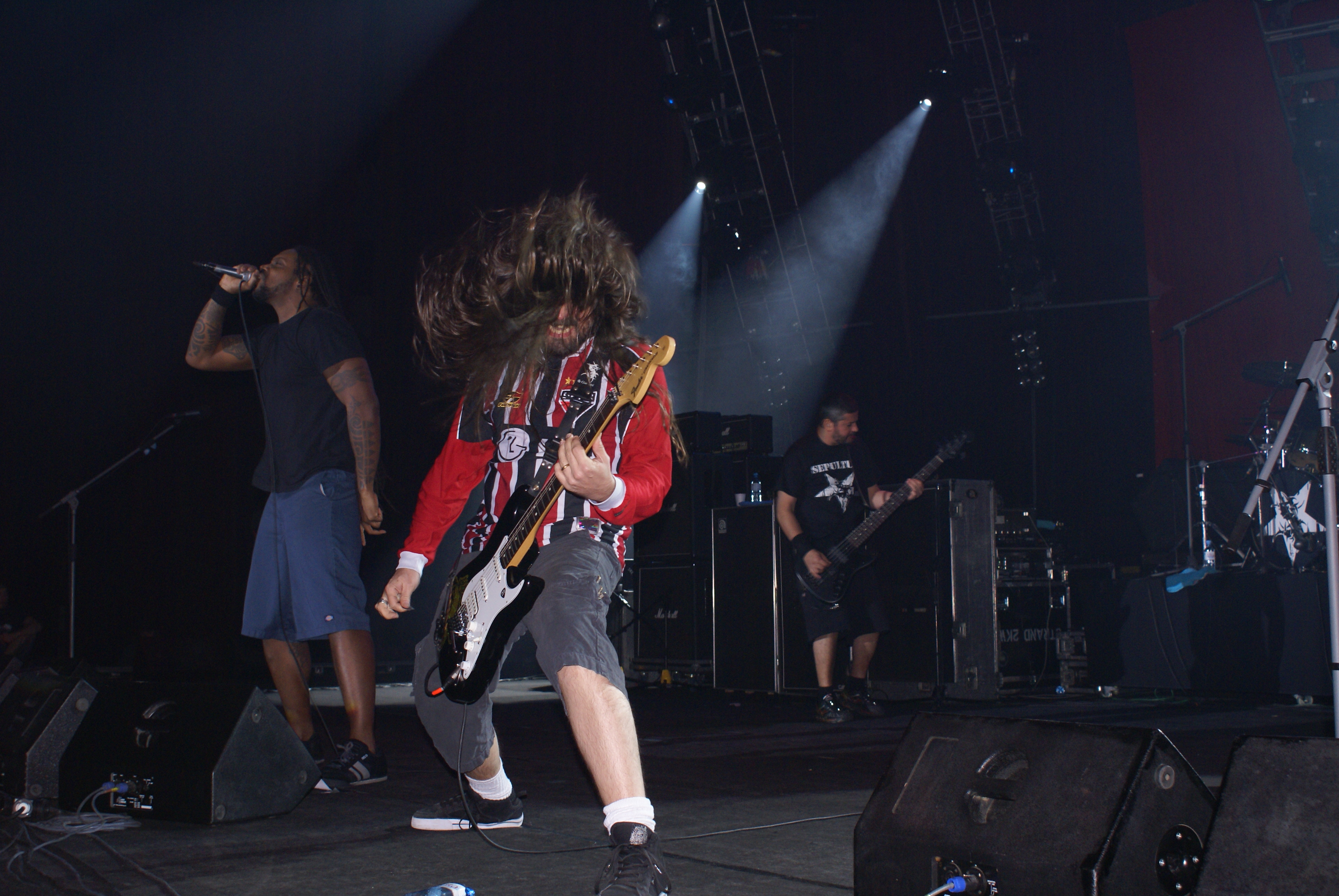
(left to right) Derrick Green, Andreas Kisser, Paulo Jr. and Jean Dolabella (off picture)

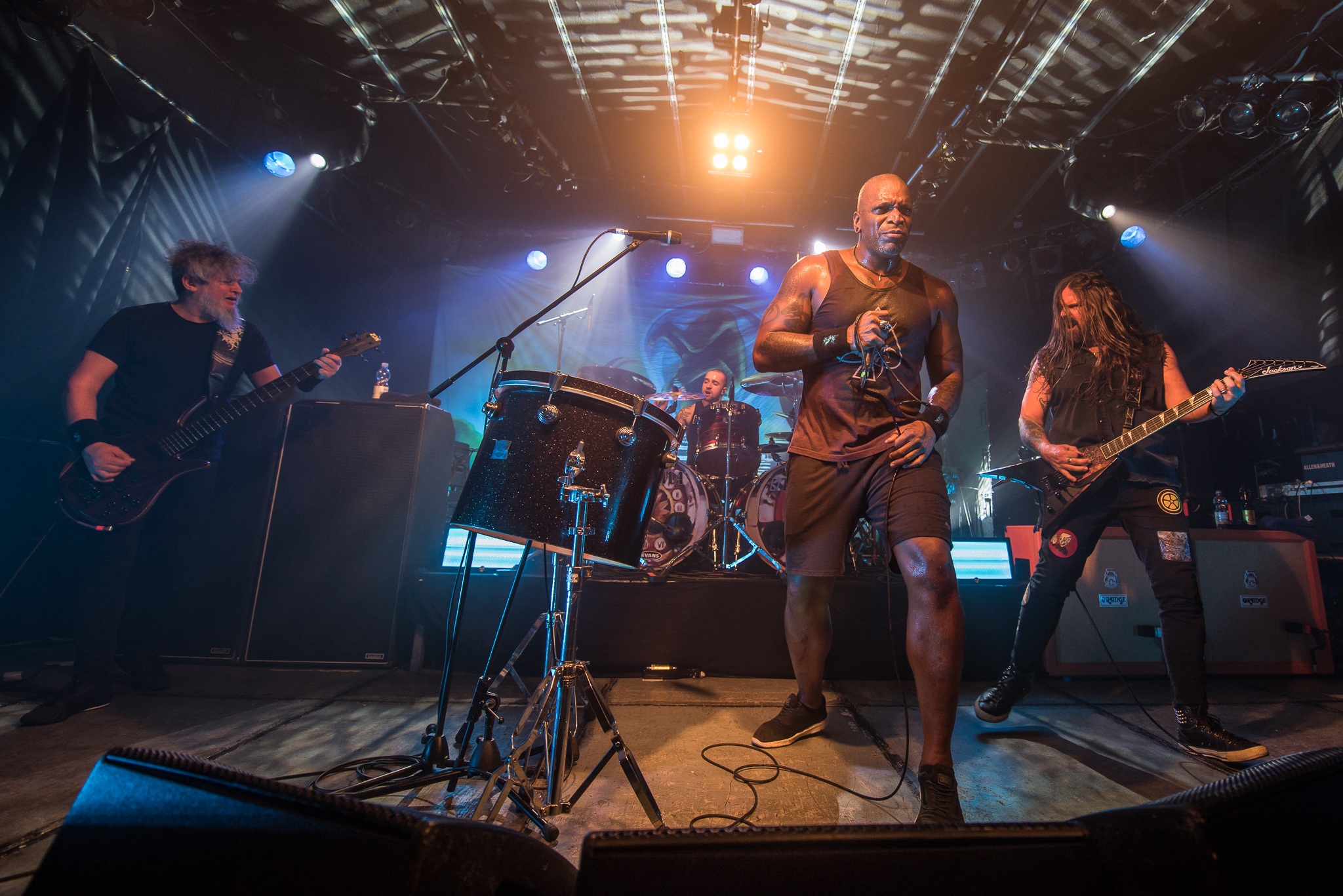
(left to right) Paulo Jr., Eloy Casagrande (on drums), Derrick Green and Andreas Kisser

Two lineups of Sepultura performing in 2007 and 2018

Sepultura was a Brazilian heavy metal band from Belo Horizonte formed by brothers guitarist/vocalist Max and drummer/percussionist Igor Cavalera in 1984. The band's first stable lineup in 1984 included Max and Igor alongside lead vocalist Wagner Lamounier, and bassist Paulo Jr. The band's final lineup included Paulo Jr. alongside guitarist Andreas Kisser (who joined in 1987), lead vocalist Derrick Green (who joined in 1997), and drummer Greyson Nekrutman (who joined in 2024).

== History ==
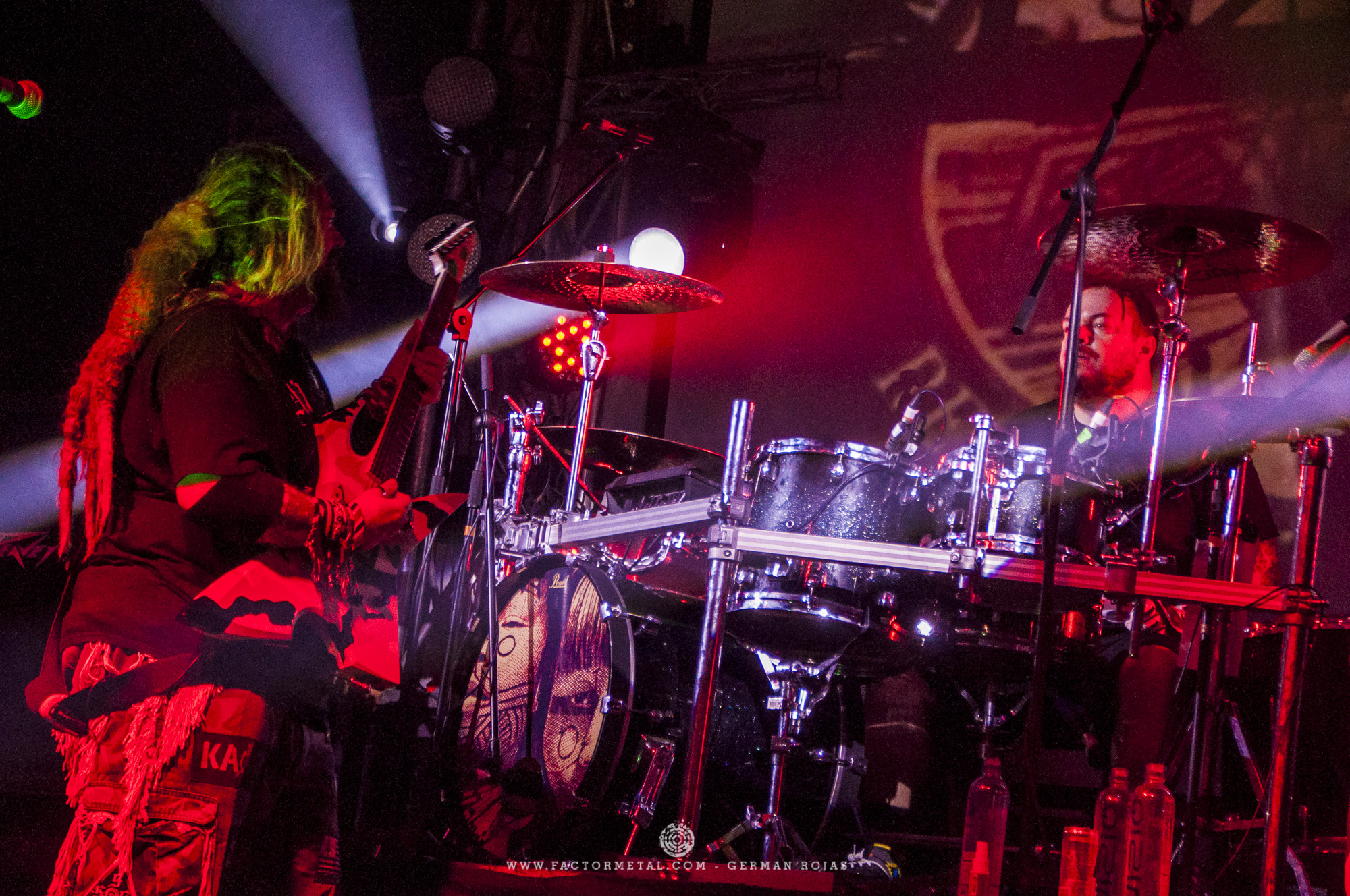
Brothers Max and Igor Cavalera founded the band after Max heard Black Sabbath Vol. 4.

Sepultura formed in 1984 in Belo Horizonte, the capital city of Minas Gerais, Brazil. The band was founded by brothers Max and Igor Cavalera, the impoverished sons of Vânia, a model, and Graciliano, a well-to-do Italian diplomat whose fatal heart attack left his family in financial ruin. Graciliano's death deeply affected his sons, inspiring them to form a band after Max heard Black Sabbath's 1972 album Black Sabbath Vol. 4 the very same day. They chose the band name Sepultura, Portuguese for "grave", when Max translated the lyrics of the Motörhead song "Dancing on Your Grave".

By 1984, they had dropped out of school. After several early membership changes, Sepultura established a stable lineup of Max on guitar, Igor on drums, lead vocalist Wagner Lamounier, and bassist Paulo Jr. Lamounier departed in March 1985 after disagreements with the band and became the leader of the pioneering Brazilian black metal band Sarcófago. After his departure, Max took over the vocal duties and Jairo Guedes joined as lead guitarist.

After about a year of performing, Sepultura signed to Cogumelo Records in 1985. Later that year, they released Bestial Devastation, a shared EP with fellow Brazilian band Overdose. It was recorded and self-produced in just two days. The band recorded their first full-length album, Morbid Visions, in August 1986. It contained their first hit, "Troops of Doom", which gained some media attention. The band then decided to relocate to the larger city of São Paulo.

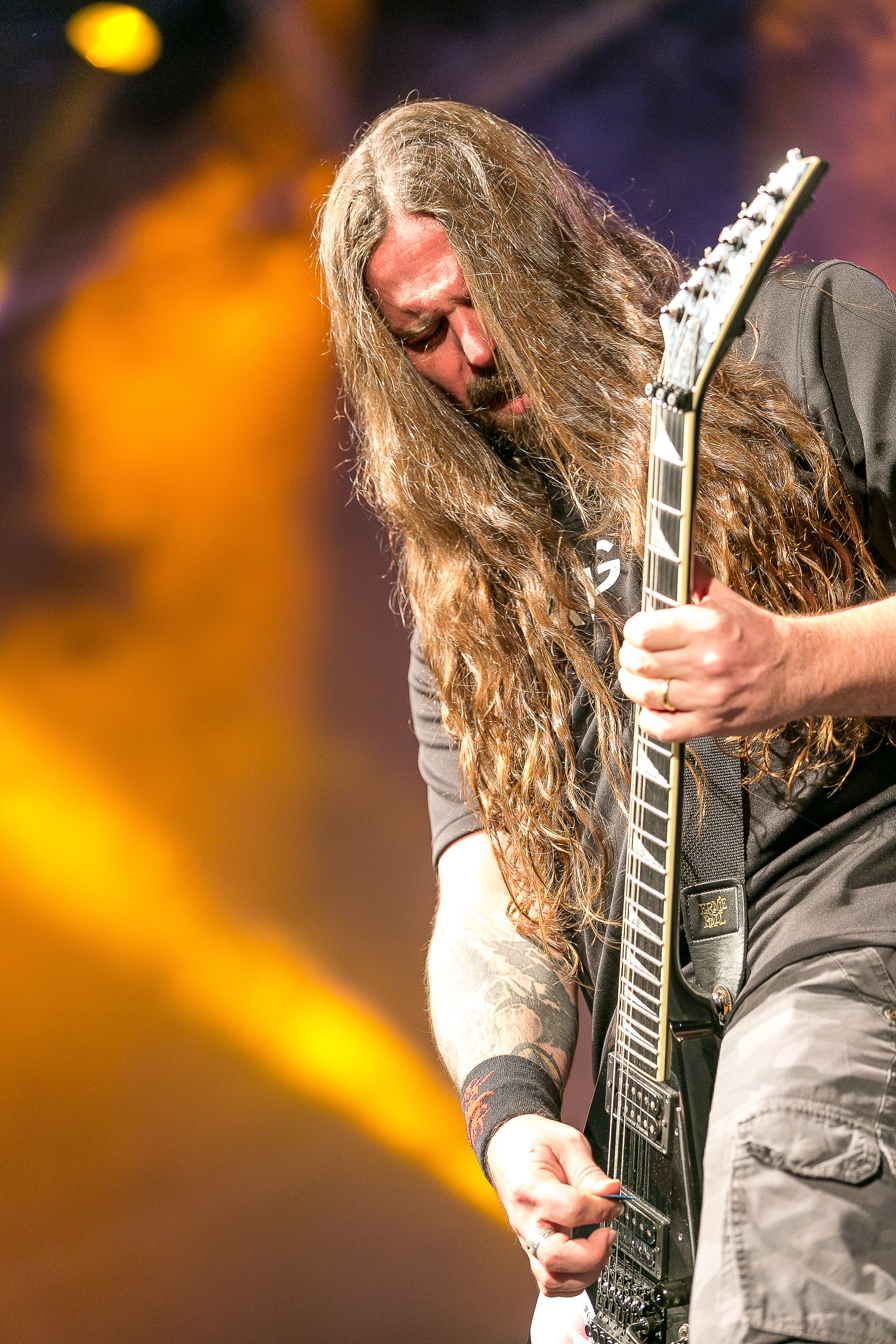
Guitarist Andreas Kisser joined the band in 1987, replacing Jairo Guedz. He later took up lead vocals between Max Cavalera's departure and Derrick Green joining.

In early 1987, Jairo Guedz quit the band. Guedz was replaced by São Paulo-based guitarist Andreas Kisser, and they released their second studio album, Schizophrenia, later that year. The album reflected a stylistic change towards a more thrash metal-oriented sound, while still keeping the death metal elements of Morbid Visions. Schizophrenia was an improvement in production and performance, and became a minor critical sensation across Europe and America as a much sought-after import. During a May 2018 interview with teenyrockers.com, Kisser noted that Sepultura would not have been possible without family support, not only from his own family, but also from the families of Max and Igor, and Paulo Jr.

In August 1996, Sepultura played on the Castle Donington Monsters of Rock main stage alongside Ozzy Osbourne, Paradise Lost, Type O Negative, Biohazard, and Fear Factory. The band was suddenly a three-piece with Andreas Kisser taking over on lead vocals, after Max Cavalera left the concert site earlier in the day upon learning of the death of his stepson Dana Wells in a car accident. After Dana Wells' funeral was finished, Max returned and continued to tour with Sepultura. A few months after Wells' death, the band had a meeting with Max and said that they wanted to fire their manager Gloria Bujnowski, who was Max's wife and Dana's mother, and find new management. Their reasoning was that Bujnowski was giving preferential treatment to Max while neglecting the rest of the band. Max, who was still coming to terms with the death of Wells, felt betrayed by his bandmates for wanting to get rid of Bujnowski and abruptly quit the band. Max Cavalera's final performance with Sepultura was at Brixton Academy in England on December 16, 1996. He officially left Sepultura very shortly after the concert, as the band opted not to renew a management contract with Bujnowski.

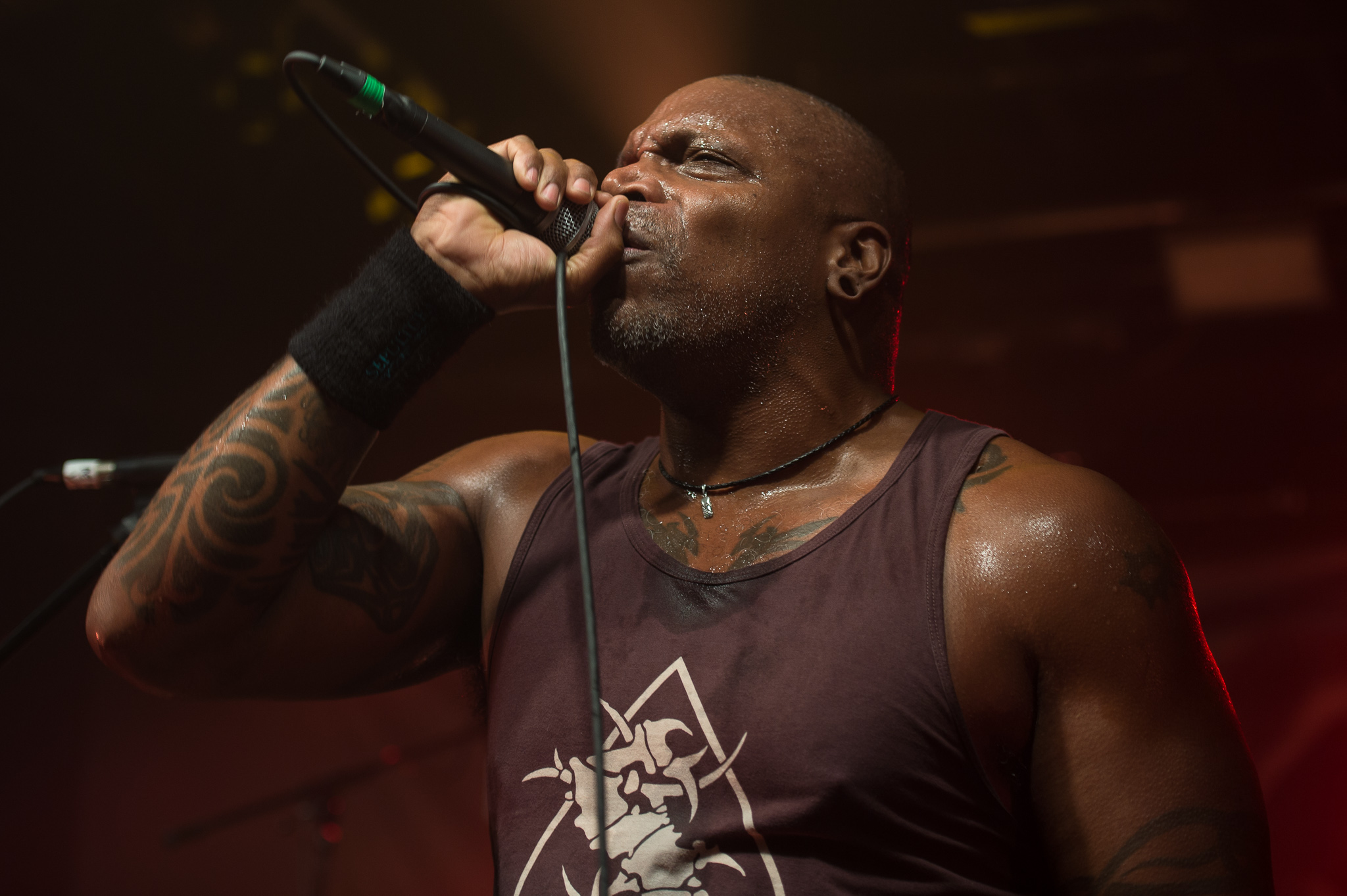
American vocalist Derrick Green joined the band following the departure of founder Max Cavalera.

Following Max Cavalera's departure, the remaining members of the band announced plans to find a new vocalist. Among those who auditioned were Chuck Billy of Testament, Phil Demmel of Machine Head and Vio-lence, Marc Grewe of Morgoth, Jorge Rosado of Merauder and a then-unknown Jason "Gong" Jones. American musician Derrick Green from Cleveland, Ohio, was selected as the band's new front-man. The first album with the new lineup was Against, which was released in 1998. The album was critically and commercially less successful than previous albums and sold considerably fewer copies than the debut album by Max Cavalera's new band Soulfly. In a retrospective review AllMusic gave the album 3 stars out of 5, stating that "there are enough flashes of the old Sepultura brilliance to suggest that great things are still to come".

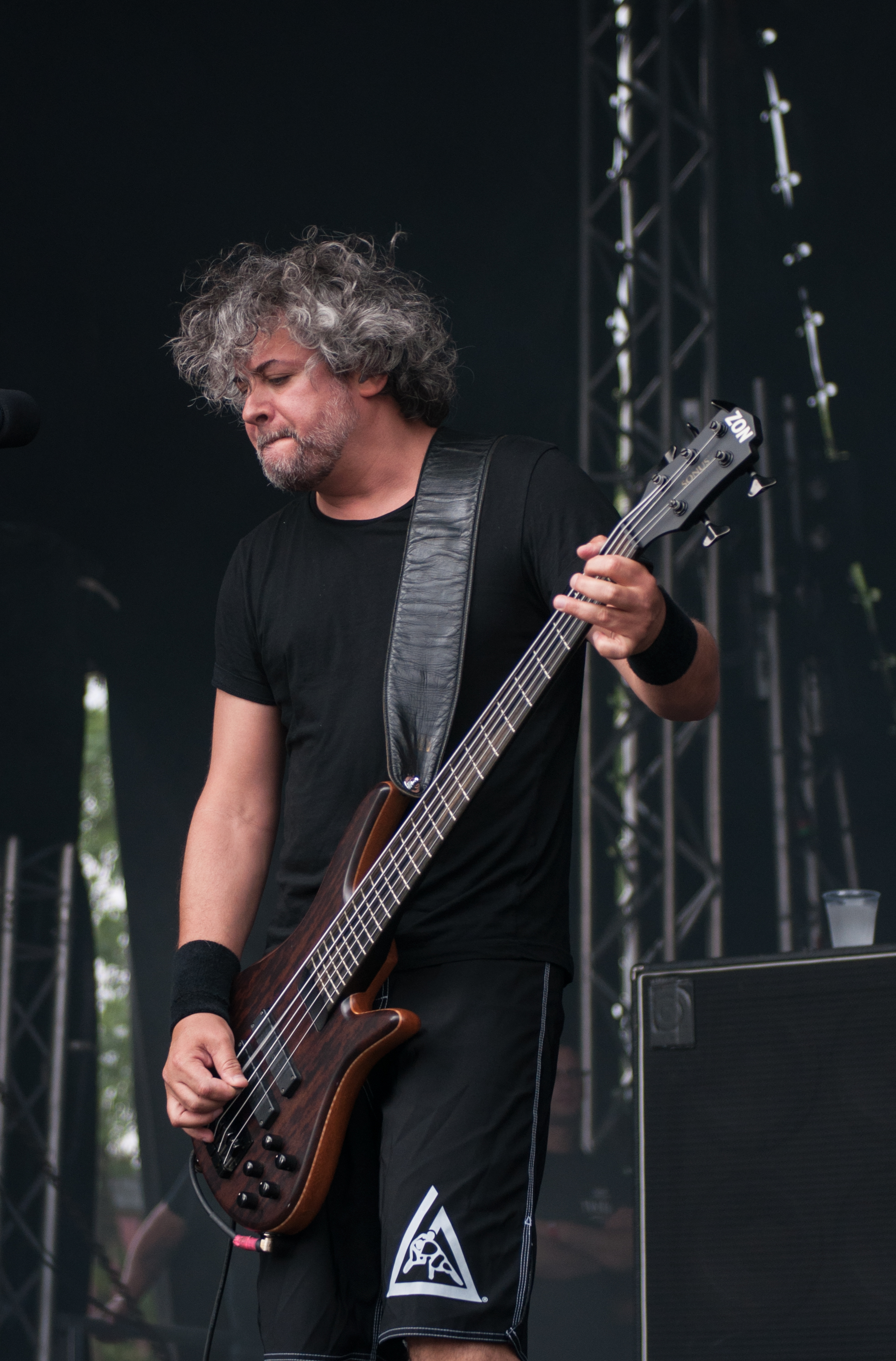
Paulo Jr. was left as the band's longest tenured member after the departure of Igor Cavalera.

In a 2007 interview with Revolver magazine, Max Cavalera stated that he and Igor, both of whom having recently reconciled after a decade-long feud, would reunite with the original Sepultura lineup. There were also rumors that the reunited line up would play on the main stage at Ozzfest 2007. However, this was denied by Kisser and the reunion did not occur. Instead, Igor Cavalera left the band after the release of Dante XXI and was replaced by Brazilian drummer Jean Dolabella, leaving the band without any of its original members. After leaving Sepultura, Igor and Max formed Cavalera Conspiracy.

Sepultura released the album A-Lex on January 26, 2009. This was the first Sepultura album to include neither of the Cavalera brothers, with bassist Paulo Jr. as the sole remaining member from the band's debut album.

On July 6, 2010, it was announced that Sepultura were signed with Nuclear Blast Records, and would release their first album for the label in 2011. The band confirmed that there would be no reunion of the classic lineup. By the end of 2010, the band began writing new material and entered the studio to begin recording their 12th album with producer Roy Z (Judas Priest, Halford, Iron Maiden's Bruce Dickinson, Helloween and Andre Matos). On March 1, 2011, Sepultura had completed recording their new album, entitled Kairos, which was released in June 2011.

The album includes cover versions of Ministry's "Just One Fix" and The Prodigy's "Firestarter", both of which are available as bonus tracks on various special-edition releases. Sepultura played on the Kairos World Tour and at Wacken Open Air 2011. Drummer Jean Dolabella left the band and was replaced by 20-year-old Eloy Casagrande in November 2011, who had already played in Brazilian heavy metal singer Andre Matos' solo band and in the Brazilian post-hardcore band Gloria. In November and December 2011 Sepultura participated the Thrashfest Classics 2011 tour alongside thrash metal bands like Exodus, Destruction, Heathen, and Mortal Sin. Eloy Casagrande left the band in February 2024, he was replaced by Greyson Nekrutman, who left Suicidal Tendencies to do so.

== Members ==
=== Final lineup ===
Image	Name	Years active	Instruments	Release contributions
	Paulo Jr.	1984–2026	bass (only live until 1991); backing vocals; percussion (1993–1997)	all releases, credit only on studio releases from Bestial Devastation (1985) to Arise (1991)
	Andreas Kisser	1987–2026	lead guitar; backing vocals; lead vocals (1996–1997); bass (1987–1991 only in studio); rhythm guitar (1996–2026)	all releases from Schizophrenia (1987)
	Derrick Green	1997–2026	lead vocals; percussion (2005–2026); additional rhythm guitar (1998–2005, 2026) (Note: Green only played rhythm guitar on select songs both live and in the studio during this time)	all releases from Against (1998), except Under a Pale Grey Sky (2002), The Best of Sepultura (2006)
	Greyson Nekrutman	2024–2026	drums; percussion	The Cloud of Unknowing (2026)

=== Former ===
Image	Name	Years active	Instruments	Release contributions
	Max Cavalera	1984–1996	lead vocals (1985–1996); rhythm guitar (1984, 1985–1996); lead guitar, backing vocals (1984–1985); percussion (1995–1996)	all releases from Bestial Devastation (1985) to Blood-Rooted (1997); Under a Pale Grey Sky (2002); The Best of Sepultura (2006)
	Igor Cavalera	1984–2006	drums (1984–2006); percussion, backing vocals (1984, 1993–2006)	all releases from Bestial Devastation (1985) to The Best of Sepultura (2006)
	Cássio	1984	rhythm guitar	none
	Beto Pinga	1984	drums	none
	Wagner Lamounier	1984–1985	lead vocals	none
	Roberto "Gato" Raffan	1984	bass	none
	Roberto UFO	1984	rhythm guitar	none
	Julio Cesar Vieira Franco	1985	lead guitar	none
	Jairo Guedz	1985–1987	lead guitar; studio bass; backing vocals	Bestial Devastation (1985); Morbid Visions (1986)
	Jean Dolabella	2006–2011	drums; percussion	A-Lex (2009); Kairos (2011)
	Eloy Casagrande	2011–2024	drums; percussion	all releases from The Mediator Between Head and Hands Must Be the Heart (2013) to Sepulquarta (2021)

=== Touring ===
Image	Name	Years active	Instruments	Notes
	Silvio Golfetti	1991	lead guitar	Golfetti filled in for Andreas Kisser in 1991 when the guitarist injured his arm.
	Guilherme Martin	2005	drums	Roadie and drum tech Guilherme Martin completed a short tour with the band in 2005 when Igor Cavalera was unavailable.
	Roy Mayorga	2006	drums	Former Soulfly drummer Roy Mayorga performed with the band in 2006 when Igor took a break to spend time with his new wife while they awaited the birth of their first child together.
	Amilcar Christófaro	2011; 2019	drums	Torture Squad drummer Amilcar Christófaro performed with the band when Dolabella injured his arm in 2011, and later when Casagrande's father died.
	Kevin Foley	2013	drums	Foley replaced Casagrande when the drummer hurt himself.
	Bruno Valverde	2022	drums	Valverde replaced Casagrande when the drummer broke his right leg in a stage accident.
	Jean Patton	2022	lead guitar	Project46 guitarist Jean Patton replaced Kisser following a bereavement.

== Recording ==
Album	Lead vocals	Rhythm Guitar	Lead guitar	Bass	Drums
Bestial Devastation	Max Cavalera		Jairo Guedz		Igor Cavalera
Morbid Visions	Max Cavalera		Jairo Guedz		Igor Cavalera
Schizophrenia	Max Cavalera		Andreas Kisser		Igor Cavalera
Beneath the Remains	Max Cavalera		Andreas Kisser		Igor Cavalera
Arise	Max Cavalera		Andreas Kisser		Igor Cavalera
Chaos A.D.	Max Cavalera		Andreas Kisser	Paulo Jr.	Igor Cavalera
Roots	Max Cavalera		Andreas Kisser	Paulo Jr.	Igor Cavalera
Against	Derrick Green	Andreas Kisser		Paulo Jr.	Igor Cavalera
Nation	Derrick Green	Andreas Kisser		Paulo Jr.	Igor Cavalera
Revolusongs	Derrick Green	Andreas Kisser		Paulo Jr.	Igor Cavalera
Roorback	Derrick Green	Andreas Kisser		Paulo Jr.	Igor Cavalera
Dante XXI	Derrick Green	Andreas Kisser		Paulo Jr.	Igor Cavalera
A-Lex	Derrick Green	Andreas Kisser		Paulo Jr.	Jean Dolabella
Kairos	Derrick Green	Andreas Kisser		Paulo Jr.	Jean Dolabella
The Mediator Between Head and Hands Must Be the Heart	Derrick Green	Andreas Kisser		Paulo Jr.	Eloy Casagrande
Machine Messiah	Derrick Green	Andreas Kisser		Paulo Jr.	Eloy Casagrande
Quadra	Derrick Green	Andreas Kisser		Paulo Jr.	Eloy Casagrande
The Cloud of Unknowing	Derrick Green	Andreas Kisser		Paulo Jr.	Greyson Nekrutman

== Line-ups ==
Period	Members	Releases
1984	Max Cavalera – lead guitar; Cássio – rhythm guitar; Beto Pinga – drums; Igor Cavalera – percussion	none
1984	Max Cavalera – lead guitar; Cássio – rhythm guitar; Igor Cavalera – drums	none
1984	Max Cavalera – lead guitar; Igor Cavalera – drums; Wagner Lamounier – lead vocals; Roberto UFO – rhythm guitar; Roberto "Gato" Raffan – bass	none
1984	Max Cavalera – lead guitar; Igor Cavalera – drums; Wagner Lamounier – lead vocals; Roberto UFO – rhythm guitar; Paulo Jr. – bass, backing vocals	none
1984–1985	Max Cavalera – guitar; Igor Cavalera – drums; Wagner Lamounier – lead vocals; Paulo Jr. – bass, backing vocals	none
1985	Max Cavalera – lead vocals, rhythm guitar; Igor Cavalera – drums; Paulo Jr. – bass, backing vocals; Julio Cesar Vieira Franco – lead guitar	none
1985	Max Cavalera – lead vocals, guitar; Igor Cavalera – drums; Paulo Jr. – bass, backing vocals	none
1985–1987	Max Cavalera – lead vocals, rhythm guitar; Igor Cavalera – drums; Paulo Jr. – bass (live), backing vocals (Note: Despite being credited as bassist on the band's first four albums, the members of Sepultura have stated in interviews that Paulo Jr. had not played on any albums prior to Chaos A.D..); Jairo Guedz – lead guitar, bass (studio), backing vocals	Bestial Devastation (1985); Morbid Visions (1986)
1987–1996	Max Cavalera – lead vocals, rhythm guitar, percussion; Igor Cavalera – drums, percussion; Paulo Jr. – bass (only live until 1991), backing vocals, percussion; Andreas Kisser – lead guitar, bass (studio until 1991), backing vocals	Schizophrenia (1987); Beneath the Remains (1989); Arise (1991); Third World Posse (1992); Chaos A.D. (1993); Natural Born Blasters (1996); Roots (1996); The Roots of Sepultura (1996); B-Sides (1997); Blood-Rooted (1997); Under a Pale Grey Sky (2002); The Best of Sepultura (2006)
1996–1997	Igor Cavalera – drums, percussion; Paulo Jr. – bass, backing vocals, percussion; Andreas Kisser – guitars, lead vocals	none – live performances
1997–2006	Igor Cavalera – drums, percussion; Paulo Jr. – bass, backing vocals; Andreas Kisser – guitars, backing vocals; Derrick Green – lead vocals, rhythm guitar, percussion	Against (1998); Nation (2001); Revolusongs (2002); Roorback (2003); Live in São Paulo (2005); Dante XXI (2006)
2006–2011	Paulo Jr. – bass, backing vocals; Andreas Kisser – guitars, backing vocals; Derrick Green – lead vocals, percussion; Jean Dolabella – drums, percussion	A-Lex (2009); Kairos (2011)
2011–2024	Paulo Jr. – bass, backing vocals; Andreas Kisser – guitars, backing vocals; Derrick Green – lead vocals, percussion; Eloy Casagrande – drums, percussion	The Mediator Between Head and Hands Must Be the Heart (2013); Metal Veins – Alive in Rock in Rio (2014); Sepultura Under My Skin (2015); Machine Messiah (2017); Quadra (2020); SepulQuarta (2021)
2024–2026	Paulo Jr. – bass, backing vocals; Andreas Kisser – guitars, backing vocals; Derrick Green – lead vocals, percussion; Greyson Nekrutman – drums, percussion	The Cloud of Unknowing (2026)
