= Quadra (album) =

Studio album by Sepultura
- Released: February 7, 2020
- Recorded: August–October 2019
- Studios: Fascination Street Studios, Örebro, Sweden
- Genres: Thrash metal; groove metal; progressive metal
- Length: 51:14
- Labels: Nuclear Blast; BMG (Brazil)
- Producer: Jens Bogren

Sepultura chronology
Machine Messiah (2017)	Quadra (2020)	The Cloud of Unknowing (2026)

Singles from Quadra
- 1. "Isolation" Released: November 8, 2019; 2. "Last Time" Released: December 20, 2019; 3. "Means to an End" Released: February 7, 2020

Quadra is the fifteenth and final studio album by Brazilian heavy metal band Sepultura, released on February 7, 2020. It is a concept album based on numerology, the number four and its significance as depicted on Quadrivium. The band went to Sweden to work with producer Jens Bogren for the recording of Quadra. It is the band's final release with drummer Eloy Casagrande before his departure from the band to join Slipknot in 2024, and their final full-length studio album before disbanding in 2026.

Quadra was the band's most successful record since 1998's Against, charting in 17 countries and entering the top 20 in seven countries (eight, considering the UK Rock & Metal Albums Chart). It was also their most successful album in Germany and Switzerland to date, exceeding the chart positions of Roots (1996), with positions number five and number 13, respectively.

== Concept ==
Guitarist Andreas Kisser explained that the concept of the album is based on Quadrivium, which are the four subjects, or arts (namely arithmetic, geometry, music, and astronomy), taught after teaching the trivium. The word is Latin, meaning four ways. The concept was discussed with the well known music photographer Marcos Hermes who was responsible for the picture of the album cover.

Based on this, the band divided the 12-track album into four sections of three songs each. The first being thrash metal songs, based on the classic Sepultura sound. The second section is inspired by the groove-percussion oriented sound the band explored in Roots. The third part has more progressive songs inspired by the track "Iceberg Dances" from Machine Messiah, but is not all instrumental tracks. Side four features slow-paced and melodic tracks, similar to the song "Machine Messiah".

Quadra is also the Portuguese term for sports court. Kisser stated that "everyone grows up in a different Quadra, shaped by rules and definitions. We are all determined by these concepts, our relationships, our careers. Our whole lives."

When Derrick Green was asked during an interview with BraveWords, "Which Sepultura album are you most proud of?", he replied, "Definitely Quadra. It's the latest album, and we really worked so hard on it. We have so many different elements from the past that have helped us get to here – where we are at right now. So, without a doubt in my mind, this is the strongest album that we've done together. And I'm extremely proud of it."

== Reception ==
Professional ratings
Aggregate scores
Source	Rating
Metacritic	77/100
Review scores
Source	Rating
AllMusic	4/5 stars
The Arts Desk	4/5 stars
Blabbermouth.net	9/10
Clash	7/10
Consequence of Sound	B
Exclaim!	8/10
Kerrang!	3/5
Metal Storm	8.0/10
Ultimate Guitar	8.7/10

Quadra received positive reviews. Thom Jurek of AllMusic wrote in a review: "Quadra is Sepultura's first album to actually stand on equal qualitative footing with their classic trilogy. It offers a series of tough, meaty, adventurous songs, that abundantly indulge raw power and emotion. Bogren's production and Sepultura's execution are in perfect balance. Further, Green delivers a career-defining performance here. It is the first Sepultura album in decades to measure favorably alongside the band's classic output". Blabbermouth's Dom Lawson wrote that Quadra "plainly and loudly showcases the sound of a band at the height of their powers, both in terms of creativity and musicianship" and calls the album "one of their finest records yet".

Metalriot.com chose Quadra as their number one album of 2020. Morgan Y. Evans wrote that the album, "...is nothing short of a monument to a lifetime in metal, the determined triumph of a legacy name never saying die and following their trusted vision over popular opinion. Quadra works on every level. In a year filled with so much death even the band's name vibrates on some heavy karmic level, but "Isolation" especially resonates deeply in a time of so much social upheaval for justice reform."

The website Collector's Room included Quadra on the top 50 Brazilian metal albums of all time. Metal Hammer named it as the 30th best metal album of 2020.

At the 2020 Metal Storm Awards, the album won a Metal Storm Award for Best Thrash Metal Album.

== Track listing ==
All lyrics are written by Derrick Green.

Quadra track listing
No.	Title	Music	Length
1.	"Isolation"	Kisser; Eloy Casagrande	4:56
2.	"Means to an End"	Kisser; Casagrande	4:39
3.	"Last Time"	Kisser; Casagrande	4:27
4.	"Capital Enslavement"	Kisser; Casagrande	3:40
5.	"Ali"	Kisser; Casagrande	4:12
6.	"Raging Void"	Kisser; Casagrande	3:57
7.	"Guardians of Earth"	Kisser; Casagrande	5:11
8.	"The Pentagram" (instrumental)	Kisser; Casagrande	5:20
9.	"Autem"	Kisser; Casagrande	4:06
10.	"Quadra" (instrumental)	Kisser	0:46
11.	"Agony of Defeat"	Kisser; Casagrande	5:51
12.	"Fear, Pain, Chaos, Suffering" (featuring Emmily Barreto)	Kisser; Casagrande	4:09
Total length:			51:14

Alive in Brazil (digipak and earbook bonus disc)
No.	Title	Lyrics	Music	Length
1.	"Choke" (from Against, 1998)	Kisser	Kisser; Igor Cavalera	3:46
2.	"Convicted in Life" (from Dante XXI, 2006)	Kisser; Green	Kisser; Green; Cavalera	3:31
3.	"Sepulnation" (from Nation, 2001)	Green; Cavalera	Kisser; Cavalera	4:41
4.	"Apes of God" (from Roorback, 2003)	Kisser; Green	Kisser; Cavalera; Green	3:22
5.	"Sepultura Under My Skin" (from Sepultura Under My Skin, 2015)	Kisser; Green	Kisser	3:45
6.	"Manipulation of Tragedy" (from The Mediator..., 2013)	Green; Kisser	Kisser; Casagrande	4:19
7.	"The Vatican" (from The Mediator..., 2013)	Green; Kisser	Kisser; Casagrande	6:34
8.	"Cut-Throat" (from Roots, 1996)	Max Cavalera	Sepultura	2:55
Total length:				32:28

- Recorded live at the Audio Club in São Paulo, Brazil on June 20, 2015

== Personnel ==
=== Sepultura ===
- Derrick Green − vocals
- Andreas Kisser − guitars
- Paulo Jr. − bass
- Eloy Casagrande − drums, percussion

=== Guests ===
- Emmily Barreto − guest vocals on track 12
- Paulo Cyrino − heavy dubstep elements on track 5
- Kadu Fernandes − percussion on track 4
- Francesco Ferrini − orchestral and key arrangements on tracks 3 and 12
- Ingrid Misgeld − conductor of the Chorus Mysticus choir
- Gunnar Misgeld − choir arrangements on track 1, 3, 7 and 11
- Robertinho Rodrigues − acoustic bass
- Renato Zanuto − keyboards, choir arrangements, orchestral and string arrangements on tracks 1, 4, 7 and 11
- Bruna Zneti − violins

== Charts ==
Sales chart performance for Quadra
Chart (2020)	Peak position
Australian Digital Albums (ARIA)	19
Austrian Albums (Ö3 Austria)	17
Belgian Albums (Ultratop Flanders)	59
Belgian Albums (Ultratop Wallonia)	54
French Albums (SNEP)	63
German Albums (Offizielle Top 100)	5
Hungarian Albums (MAHASZ)	12
Polish Albums (ZPAV)	23
Portuguese Albums (AFP)	11
Scottish Albums (Official Charts)	31
Spanish Albums (Promusicae)	40
Swiss Albums (Schweizer Hitparade)	13
UK Independent Albums (Official Charts)	11
UK Rock & Metal Albums (Official Charts)	5
