= Machine Messiah (album) =

Studio album by Sepultura
- Released: January 13, 2017
- Recorded: October–November 2016
- Studio: Fascination Street Studios, Örebro, Sweden
- Genre: Thrash metal; groove metal
- Length: 46:05; 50:40 (deluxe edition)
- Label: Nuclear Blast – Sony (Latin America)
- Producer: Jens Bogren

Sepultura chronology
The Mediator Between Head and Hands Must Be the Heart (2013)	Machine Messiah (2017)	Quadra (2020)

Singles from Machine Messiah
- 1. "I Am the Enemy" Released: November 10, 2016

Machine Messiah is the fourteenth studio album by Brazilian heavy metal band Sepultura, released on January 13, 2017. The album sold 1,900 units in the United States in its first week. The title of the album was inspired by the song of the same name from Yes' 1980 album Drama.

== Album information ==
The band recorded Machine Messiah in Sweden with producer Jens Bogren. Machine Messiah is the band's first studio album in over three years since The Mediator Between Head and Hands Must Be the Heart (2013), marking the longest gap between two studio albums in their career. The album cover art was created by Filipino artist Camille Dela Rosa.

The band stated the concept of the album, saying, "The main inspiration around Machine Messiah is the robotization of our society nowadays. The concept of a God Machine who created humanity and now it seems that this cycle is closing itself, returning to the starting point. We came from machines and we are going back to where we came from. The messiah, when he returns, will be a robot, or an humanoid, our biomechanical savior."

== Reception ==
Professional ratings
Review scores
Source	Rating
AllMusic	3.5/5 stars
Metal Hammer	8/10 stars
Terrorizer	4/5 stars

Machine Messiah received positive reviews, with many critics calling it one of Sepultura's best albums. Thom Jurek of Allmusic gave it 3.5 stars out of 5, saying that, "Machine Messiah continues to build on the diverse proggish elements displayed on Dante XXI, A-Lex, and Kairos, while re-engaging with the thrash and hardcore that made 2013's The Mediator Between Head and Hands Must Be the Heart so compelling." He described the album as an "ambitious, angry, hungry outing", and that, "Sepultura remain vital in their creativity; they expand their palette dramatically while fully integrating the sounds that brought them here."

New Noise gave the album 5 stars out of 5 and said, "Sepultura have very well created one of 2017's most noticeable records in Machine Messiah. While Green provides capturing vocals and lyrics, the instrumentals truly stand as a testament to incredible musicianship." And that, "Sepultura have crafted an album to be incredibly proud of, and one fans will adore. Machine Messiah is a record that embodies the strengths of the past, innovative combination, and excellent musicianship on all levels."

Loudwire praised the guitar playing, saying, "One thing that doesn't change is Kisser's skillful guitar work. Whether he's blazing along at maximum velocity or exploring progressive territory, it's creative and flawlessly played." First Post praised the vocals, saying, "Green is mesmerising, hypnotic and aggression personified in equal parts, and his versatility across the space of just these 10 tracks show exactly why there should never be a reunion."

No Clean Singing praised the drumming, saying, "The other thing that really brings Machine Messiah to life is drummer Eloy Casagrande, whose own writing on this record is phenomenal. This is the first truly great drum performance of 2017 that I've heard, and I think it'll turn out to be a real standout for me for the rest of the year. He approaches the album in two extremes: He either sticks to the super tried-and-true basics or he just throws something completely fucking out there (see the fucked-up blast-beats in "I Am The Enemy"), and shows that he's not only filling the shoes of his predecessor just fine, he's outright superior to him in every regard as a living, breathing groove factory."

Maximum Volume Music praised Machine Messiah as one of their very best albums, saying, "It would come as something of a shock that at this point in their careers, Sepultura sound this vital and this fresh. But then, the only surprising thing, perhaps is that we are still surprised. Sepultura: confounding expectations since 1984 – and this is up there with their best."

Pure Grain Audio called the album "a very accomplished piece of work in its entirety, encompassing a variation of styles and syncopations." Already Heard praised the musicianship, saying, "The playing on this record is unbelievable, Andreas Kisser is on fire throughout, Paulo Jr's bass is heavy as hell and drummer Eloy Casagrande is stunning in his versatility. Tracks 9 and 6 were also praised, saying, "Vandals Nest" rips the listener's head clean off; Kisser's shredding is so sharp everything else is slow motion – killer. However, the one track that stands above is the absolutely massive 'Sworn Oath', its cinematic orchestration and angular guitar lines cut into a pounding bass drum that leads into as epic a thrasher as you are likely to hear."

My Global Mind said, "Let's face it, our present day relies on machines. The computers and cell phones we glare into space for hours on end are machines. Many lost the ability of social interaction, making simple meeting places such as coffee shops, music stores, and arcades, a memory of the past. Everything is turning into a controlled digital monopoly, pulling our human strings into a handful of directions that we end up having short attention spans or enter frustrated confusion. With that said, to me, this is what Sepultura's Machine Messiah is all about."

It was elected the 18th-best Brazilian album of 2017 by the Brazilian edition of Rolling Stone.

== Track listing ==
All lyrics are written by Derrick Green (1, 3, 4, 6 to 11), Andreas Kisser (2, 4) and Kyouchi Azuma (12); all music is composed by Kisser, Green and Eloy Casagrande, except "Iceberg Dances" by Kisser and Casagrande, and "Ultraseven no Uta" by Toru Fuyuki.

No.	Title	Length
1.	"Machine Messiah"	5:54
2.	"I Am the Enemy"	2:27
3.	"Phantom Self"	5:30
4.	"Alethea"	4:31
5.	"Iceberg Dances" (instrumental)	4:41
6.	"Sworn Oath"	6:09
7.	"Resistant Parasites"	4:58
8.	"Silent Violence"	3:46
9.	"Vandals Nest"	2:47
10.	"Cyber God"	5:22
Total length:		46:05

Bonus tracks
No.	Title	Length
11.	"Chosen Skin"	3:17
12.	"Ultraseven no Uta"	1:18
Total length:		50:40

== Personnel ==
Band

- Derrick Green − vocals
- Andreas Kisser − guitars
- Paulo Jr. − bass
- Eloy Casagrande − drums, percussion

Technical

- Jens Bogren − producer, mixing
- Linus Corneliusson − editing, mixing assistant
- Viktor Stenquist − engineering
- Andre Alvinzi − programming
- Tony Lindgren − mastering
- David Castillo − drum engineering
- Ludwig Nasvall − drum technician

Art

- Javier Andrés − artwork, design, layout
- Camille Della Rosa − artwork
- Dedé Moreira − band photo
- David Owen − back cover photo
- Erik Cupino − photography
- Gorka Rodrigo − photography

Musical guests

- Elyes Bouchoucha − conductor
- Kévin Codfert − conductor, violin arrangements
- Renato Zanuto − conductor/arrangements/performer horn quintet, mini-moog and hammond
- Bechir Gharbi − violins
- Hamza Obba − violins
- Mohamed Gharbi − violins
- Youssef Belheni − violins
- Agnaldo Gonçalves − horns
- Douglas Costa − horns
- Marcos Tudera − horns
- Mauricio Martins − horns
- Rafael Nascimento − horns
- André Alvinzi − additional programming

== Charts ==
Chart (2017)	Peak position
Australian Albums (ARIA)	82
Austrian Albums (Ö3 Austria)	33
Belgian Albums (Ultratop Flanders)	35
Belgian Albums (Ultratop Wallonia)	67
French Albums (SNEP)	114
German Albums (Offizielle Top 100)	27
New Zealand Albums (RMNZ)	135
Portuguese Albums (AFP)	35
Scottish Albums (OCC)	100
Swiss Albums (Schweizer Hitparade)	27
UK Independent Albums (OCC)	18
UK Rock & Metal Albums (OCC)	9
US Independent Albums (Billboard)	11
