= The Cloud of Unknowing (EP) =

EP by Sepultura
- Released: April 24, 2026
- Recorded: January – February 2025
- Studios: Criteria Studios, North Miami, Florida
- Genres: Groove metal; thrash metal; progressive metal; death metal
- Length: 16:29
- Label: Nuclear Blast
- Producers: Sepultura; Stanley Soares

Sepultura chronology
Quadra (2020)	The Cloud of Unknowing (2026)

Singles from The Cloud of Unknowing
- 1. "The Place" Released: February 26, 2026

The Cloud of Unknowing is an EP by Brazilian heavy metal band Sepultura, released on April 24, 2026, through Nuclear Blast. As their final studio output, it is the band's only studio recording with drummer Greyson Nekrutman, who replaced Eloy Casagrande in 2024, and its release coincided with the final year of Sepultura's final world tour. The EP marked the only time since A-Lex (2009) that they worked with producer Stanley Soares.

== Reception ==
Critical reception of The Cloud of Unknowing was mixed to positive. Dom Lawson of Blabbermouth.net wrote, "While we can acknowledge that a four-song EP is a slightly disappointing way to conclude an illustrious, four-decade career, it is equally worth noting that Sepultura are still a fearsome force for heavy metal greatness, and The Cloud of Unknowing is strong enough to be regarded as more than a footnote in the band's catalogue. A full album would have been great, but you really can't have everything."

== Track listing ==
No.	Title	Lyrics	Music	Length
1.	"All Souls Rising"	Derrick Green	Andreas Kisser; Green; Greyson Nekrutman	3:35
2.	"Beyond the Dream"	Kisser; Green; Sérgio Britto; Tony Bellotto	Kisser; Green; Britto; Bellotto	4:04
3.	"Sacred Books"	Kisser	Kisser; Nekrutman	2:52
4.	"The Place"	Green	Kisser; Green; Nekrutman	5:58

== Personnel ==
Sepultura

- Derrick Green – vocals
- Andreas Kisser – guitars
- Paulo Jr. – bass
- Greyson Nekrutman – drums, percussion

== Charts ==
Chart performance for The Cloud of Unknowing
Chart (2026)	Peak position
French Physical Albums (SNEP)	128
French Rock & Metal Albums (SNEP)	37
