= The Mediator Between Head and Hands Must Be the Heart =

2013 studio album by Sepultura

Studio album by Sepultura
- Released: October 25, 2013 (Europe); October 28, 2013 (UK); October 29, 2013 (North America)
- Recorded: June−July 2013
- Studio: Ross Robinson’s Home Studio (Venice, California)
- Genre: Thrash metal; groove metal; death metal
- Length: 47:04
- Label: Nuclear Blast, Tribus Music (Brazil)
- Producer: Ross Robinson

Sepultura chronology
Kairos (2011)	The Mediator Between Head and Hands Must Be the Heart (2013)	Machine Messiah (2017)

Singles from The Mediator Between Head and Hands Must Be the Heart
- 1. "The Age of the Atheist" Released: September 20, 2013

The Mediator Between Head and Hands Must Be the Heart is the thirteenth studio album by Brazilian heavy metal band Sepultura. It was released on October 25, 2013 in Europe on October 29 in the United States via Nuclear Blast. The album is based on the 1927 science fiction film Metropolis; its title is a quote from the film.

It is the band's first album to feature drummer Eloy Casagrande, and the first album by the band to be recorded in the United States since 1998's Against. The album was produced by Ross Robinson, who previously produced the band's 1996 album Roots.

== Background ==
The band hinted at a thirteenth studio album as early as May 2012, when guitarist Andreas Kisser told Metal Underground that Sepultura would soon "start working on something new with [new drummer who joined in 2011] Eloy [Casagrande]" and see if they could "get ready for new music early next year." Later, Kisser revealed that Sepultura was "already thinking about new ideas" for their next album and was going to "have something new going on" in 2013.

On December 10, 2012, producer Ross Robinson, who produced Sepultura's Roots album, hinted on Twitter that he would be producing the new album, tweeting: "Oh, didn't mention.. Spoke to Andreas, it's on. My vision, smoke Roots- It can be done", which was later confirmed with another announcement that Steve Evetts would be co-producing the album.

By April 2013, the band had 13 songs in development, with Kisser commenting positively about the progress of the album, saying: "This is the first time writing with Eloy Casagrande on drums and everything sounds fresh(...)You'll just have to wait to hear it. It's very difficult to describe what we're doing, but I can say that will be one of the strongest Sepultura albums to date." In May, vocalist Derrick Green reported "We have written most of the music already and now we are working on lyrics for the album. We should have everything ready before we hit the studio June 1st."

On June 10, during the recording of the album, the band announced that they had six songs recorded for the album, and according to Kisser, they were "going in a rate of two songs a day". Later that month, it was announced that former Slayer drummer Dave Lombardo would make a guest appearance on the album, with Kisser explaining "When the mics were all ready and running Eloy and Dave started playing and the magic was on, so great! The part they recorded will be a special part on the middle of one of the songs, it came out crazy!"

On July 12, it was announced that the band has completed recording the album, and a week later, they announced that it would be called The Mediator Between Head and Hands Must Be the Heart.

== Musical style ==
Vocalist Derrick Green described the album's sound as "really sinister, dark, and metal as hell!" whilst guitarist Andreas Kisser said that the album is "brutal, fast and straight to the point". They also commented positively on the input of new drummer Eloy Casagrande, with Green explaining "It's been great working with Eloy in the writing process because it brings a whole different energy to the music. The many changes that have been going on in our lives and in the world also add to the making of the new album."

== Concept ==
Guitarist Andreas Kisser said of the album title: "I was inspired by a phrase which is the main message of the story: "The mediator between the head and hands must be the heart" to express what we are saying on the lyrics." Although the album was inspired by the 1927 film Metropolis, it is not intended to be a concept album, unlike two of the band's previous studio albums, Dante XXI (based on Dante Alighieri's The Divine Comedy) and A-Lex (based on the 1962 novel A Clockwork Orange by Anthony Burgess). As guitarist Andreas Kisser explained:

"In the movie, a crazy millionaire wants to transform a robot into a real person. That's kind of the opposite of what we live today. More than ever we are robotized, through the worldwide web, Google glasses, chips under our skins and the globalized slavery our society suffers nowadays. The [aforementioned] phrase points to the heart as being the human factor who keeps a man, a man, not a robot. The heart beats with freedom of choice, we have to think by ourselves to create a real world, not a matrix. Being a novel written in the early 1920s, it's almost prophetical. It helped us to put the ideas together for the lyrics to express what we see today. I live in São Paulo, Brasil, one of the big metropolis in the world with more than 20,000,000 people living and working in it. I know how it is to live in daily chaos, our music reflects a lot of that feeling."

== Reception ==
Professional ratings
Review scores
Source	Rating
About.com	4/5 stars
AllMusic	3.5/5 stars
Blabbermouth.net	8/10 stars

Ray Van Horn Jr. of Blabbermouth.net gave the album 8 of 10 stars, stating that, "(...) most people should come out of this listening session pleased by the results". Matt Hinch from About.com said that, "Mediator is arguably Sepultura's best album this millennium and I'm sure some will even say since Chaos A.D.", and gave the album 4 of 5 stars.

The album sold over 1,800 copies in the United States in its first week of release.

== Track listing ==
All lyrics are written by Derrick Green and Andreas Kisser; all music is composed by Kisser and Eloy Casagrande, except where noted.

No.	Title	Length
1.	"Trauma of War"	3:45
2.	"The Vatican" (intro composed by Renato Zanuto)	6:33
3.	"Impending Doom"	4:15
4.	"Manipulation of Tragedy"	4:16
5.	"Tsunami"	5:10
6.	"The Bliss of Ignorants"	4:51
7.	"Grief"	5:34
8.	"The Age of the Atheist"	4:19
9.	"Obsessed" (featuring Dave Lombardo)	3:53
10.	"Da Lama ao Caos" (Chico Science & Nação Zumbi cover; music by Science)	4:28
Total length:		47:04

Bonus track (iTunes exclusive)
No.	Title	Length
11.	"Stagnate State of Affairs"	3:37

== Personnel ==
Sepultura

- Derrick Green – lead vocals, percussion on "Da Lama ao Caos"
- Andreas Kisser – guitars, backing vocals, lead vocals on "Da Lama ao Caos"
- Paulo Jr. – bass
- Eloy Casagrande – drums, percussion

Additional personnel

- Dave Lombardo – additional drums on "Obsessed"
- Fredo Ortiz – percussion
- Renato Zanuto – keyboards and "intro" of "The Vatican"
- Jaque Humara – voice effects

Technical staff

- Ross Robinson – production
- Steve Evetts – mixing
- Alan Douches – mastering
- Alexandre Wagner – paintings
- Melissa Castro – photo
- Rob Kimura – layout
- Mike Balboa – studio assistant
- Gregoy Alan Coates – technician

Digipak includes "making of" DVD.

- Otavio Juliano – direction
- Luciana Ferraz – executive production
- Mike Balboa – photography
- Eduardo de Andrea – photography
- Otavio Juliano – photography

== Charts ==
Chart (2013)	Peak position
Belgian Albums (Ultratop Flanders)	151
Belgian Albums (Ultratop Wallonia)	112
French Albums (SNEP)	153
German Albums (Offizielle Top 100)	76
Swiss Albums (Schweizer Hitparade)	96
UK Rock & Metal Albums (OCC)	22
US Independent Albums (Billboard)	50

== Singles ==
- "The Age of the Atheist" – released in 2013

No.	Title	Length
1.	"The Age of the Atheist"	4:19
2.	"Zombie Ritual" (Death cover)	4:45
