= Cultura Tres =

Venezuelan metal band

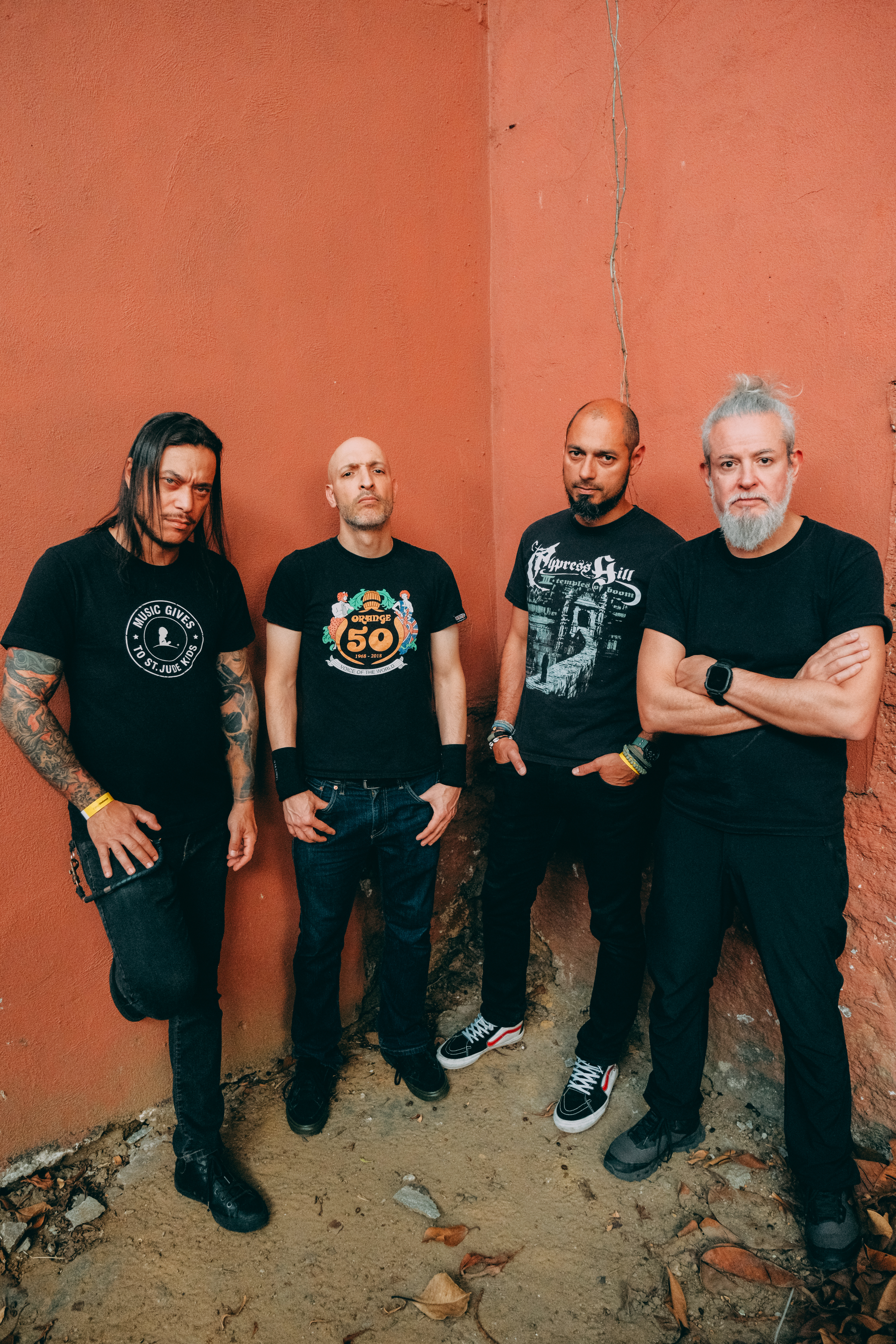
- Left to right: Henrique Pucci, Alejandro Londono Montoya, Juanma de Ferrari Montoya, Paulo Xisto Pinto Jr. (2025)

Background information
- Origin: Maracay, Venezuela
- Genres: Sludge metal, doom metal, groove metal
- Years active: 2006–present
- Members: Alejandro Londoño Montoya; Paulo Xisto Pinto Jr.; Juanma de Ferrari Montoya; Henrique Pucci
- Past members: Marcel Capell; Darell Laclé; David Abbink; Alonso Milano Mendoza; Benoit Martiny; Jerry Vergara

Cultura Tres is a South American metal band formed in Maracay in 2006 by brothers Alejandro and Juanma Montoya.

== History ==
During the band's sludge-doom era, guitarist brothers Alejandro and Juanma Montoya produced several independent releases. In its early years, the band toured Europe, Japan and South America, and was listed as a "discovery of the month" for Metal Hammer UK. Burrn!, a Japanese magazine, described the band as "Tool meets South American rock", and praised the band's "dark, gloomy riffs with swelling groove". In a review in Metal Underground, the band's self-released album El Mal Del Bien (2011) was praised as "a memorable album", receiving 4/5 or "excellent" on the publication's rating system.

In 2019, the Montoya brothers' friend Paulo Jr. (bass player of Sepultura) joined the band. Soon after, the first demo sessions took place in a studio in Amsterdam. The resulting style retained elements of the band's psychedelic-sludgy past, but incorporated Paulo's influence.

During the following three years and despite the COVID-19 pandemic, Cultura Tres worked on an album. Drummers Alonso Milano Mendoza and Jerry Vergara joined the band as studio musicians to record Camino de Brujos ("Trail of Witches"), an album that explored new and old musical textures. Camino de Brujos was released in 2023 through Outono / Universal Music Group in the Americas and in the rest of the world through AJM / Bloodblast. It received praise for its tone in Bass Magazine. The addition of Henrique Pucci, a Brazilian drummer, completed Cultura Tres' new lineup. The band started preparing their follow-up album, scheduled for release in February 2025.

== Members ==
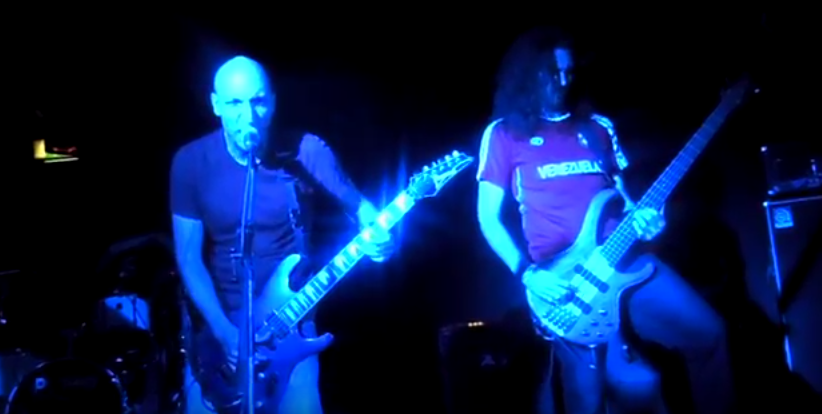
Cultura Tres performing in London, 2013

Current members

- Alejandro Londoño Montoya – guitar and vocals
- Juanma de Ferrari Montoya – guitar and backing vocals
- Paulo Xisto Pinto Jr. – bass (2019 – current)
- Henrique Pucci – drums (2024 – current)

Former members

- Marcel Capell – bass (2007)
- Darrell Laclé – bass (2007–2008 – 2017–2018)
- David Abbink – drums (2007–2013)
- Benoit Martiny – drums (2014–2018)
- Alonso Milano Mendoza – bass – drums (2008–2020)
- Jerry Vergara – drums (2021–2024)

== Discography ==
- Seis – 2007 (EP)
- La Cura – 2008 (album)
- El Mal Del Bien – 2011 (album)
- Rezando Al Miedo – 2013 (album)
- La Secta – 2017 (album)
- Camino de Brujos – 2023 (album)
