= Outface =

American punk rock band

- Origin: Cleveland, Ohio, U.S.
- Genres: Alternative metal; hardcore punk; post-hardcore; reggae; ska; funk metal
- Years active: 1985–1992
- Label: Crisis Records
- Spinoffs: Overfiend, Alpha Jerk
- Past members: Charlie Garriga; Frank Cavanagh; Mark Konopka; Chris Hall; Derrick Green

Outface was an American punk rock band formed in the Cleveland, Ohio area in the mid 1980s, by Chris Hall and self-taught guitarist Charlie Garriga. Outface was eventually fronted by Derrick Green who went on to become the singer for the Brazilian thrash metal band Sepultura. The band also featured Frank Cavanagh, the future bassist of Filter; Garriga would later play for CIV. Mark Konopka was Outface's drummer. They recorded one demo tape in 1987, and later reunited for a studio album, Friendly Green, released in 1992. Stylistically, their music varies between rock, metal and punk with ska elements, not unlike the early works of Red Hot Chili Peppers. Green was credited as Simon Verde on the Outface release.

== Members ==
Last line-up

- Derrick Green a.k.a. Simon Verde – vocals, trumpet (1986–1992)
- Charlie Garriga a.k.a. Charlie Bucket – guitars (1985–1992)
- Frank Cavanagh a.k.a. Gerald Francis – bass (1985–1992)
- Mark Konopka a.k.a. Marque "Straw Dog" David – drums, percussion (1985–1992)

Former members

- Chris Hall – vocals (1985–1986)

Session members

- Dan Dulin – horns (on Friendly Green)
- Jeff Baker – horns (on Friendly Green)

== Discography ==
- Demo 1986
- Demo 1990
- Friendly Green (1992)
