= Revolusongs =

EP by Sepultura
- Released: November 22, 2002
- Recorded: July 28 – August 9, 2002
- Studio: Estudios Trama (São Paulo, Brazil)
- Length: 28:14
- Label: Universal/SPV/Victor Entertainment
- Producer: Steve Evetts

Sepultura chronology
Under a Pale Grey Sky (2002)	Revolusongs (2002)	Roorback (2003)

Revolusongs is an EP of cover songs released by Brazilian heavy metal band Sepultura exclusively in Brazil and Japan in 2002. It was released in 2003 through SPV Records as a bonus disc for their Roorback album.

The EP contains seven cover songs. The cover of U2's "Bullet the Blue Sky" was released as a single, but as a part of their next album, Roorback. Revolusongs was later included as a bonus disc on the digipak and vinyl LP editions of Roorback, minus the final song and video tracks.

== Reception ==
Professional ratings
Review scores
Source	Rating
AllMusic	4/5 stars

The album received good reviews, and due to its limited release, it sold over 15,000 copies.

== Track listing ==
No.	Title	Writer(s)	Length
1.	"Messiah" (Hellhammer cover)	Tom Warrior; Martin Eric Ain	3:27
2.	"Angel" (Massive Attack cover)	Robert Del Naja; Grantley Marshall; Andrew Vowles; Horace Andy	5:13
3.	"Black Steel in the Hour of Chaos (Feat. Sabotage)" (Public Enemy cover)	Eric Sadler; James Boxley; Carlton Ridenhour; William Drayton	4:02
4.	"Mongoloid" (Devo cover)	Mark Mothersbaugh; Gerald Casale	2:35
5.	"Mountain Song" (Jane's Addiction cover)	Perry Farrell; David Navarro; Eric Avery; Stephen Perkins	3:28
6.	"Bullet the Blue Sky" (U2 cover)	Paul Hewson; Dave Evans; Adam Clayton; Larry Mullen	4:34
7.	"Piranha" (Exodus cover)	Exodus	3:39
8.	"Enter Sandman/Fight Fire with Fire Medley" (Metallica cover)		1:10
9.	"Bullet the Blue Sky [video]" (Roorback bonus CD)		4:34

== Credits ==
Sepultura

- Derrick Green - vocals
- Andreas Kisser - guitars
- Paulo Jr. - bass
- Igor Cavalera - drums, percussion

Additional personnel

- Sepultura - production
- Zé Gonzales - scratching (3), programming (3), production
- Sabotage - additional vocals (3)
- Maurício Felício - assistant engineering
- Ronaldo Frige - technical assistance
- Igor Cavalera - design
- Estevam Romera - design, photography
- Alan Douches - mastering
- Steve Evetts - production, engineering, mixing
