= Derrick Green =

American musician

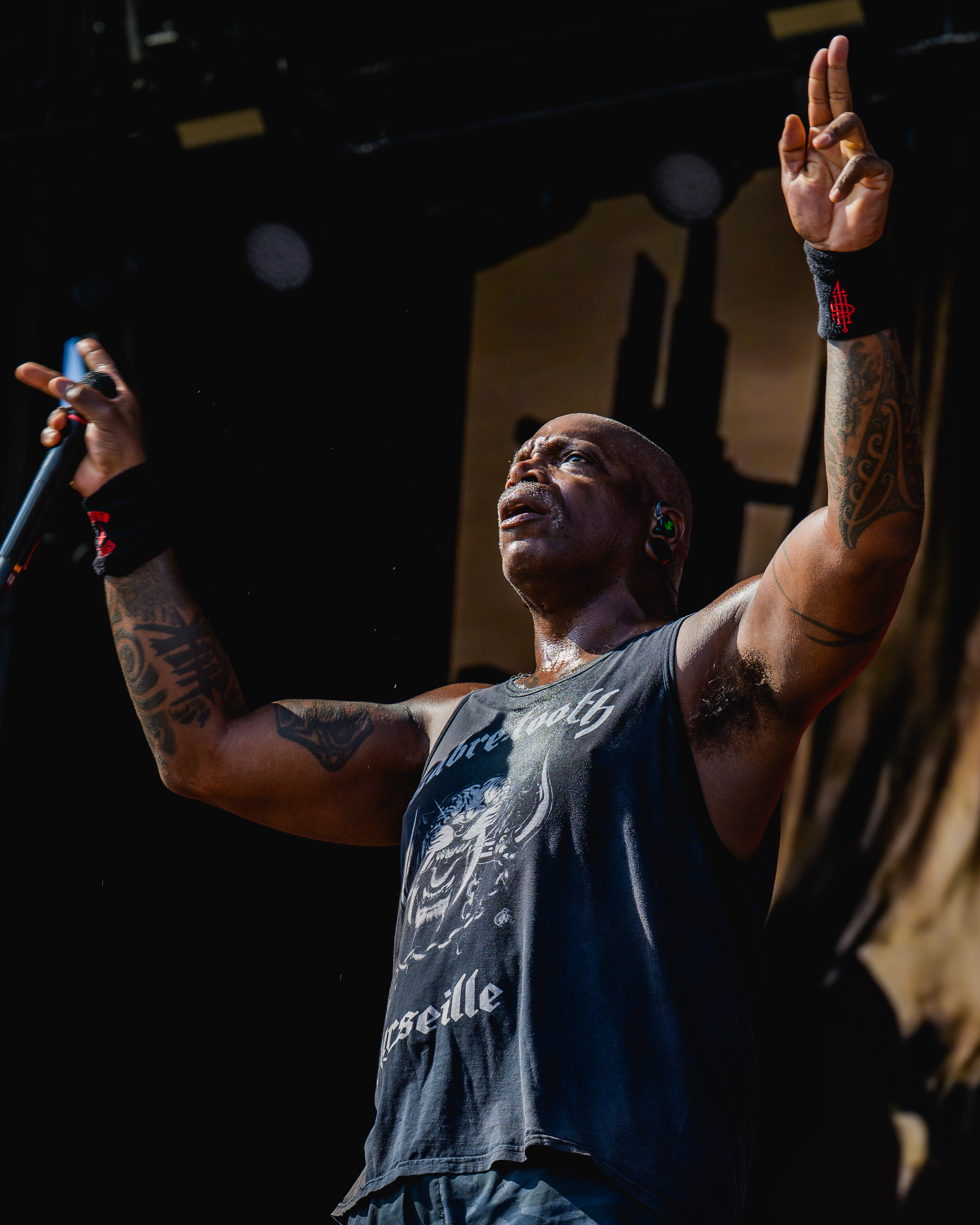
- Derrick Green in 2026

Background information
- Born: Derrick Leon Green; January 20, 1971 (age 55); Cleveland, Ohio, U.S.
- Genres: Groove metal; thrash metal; death metal; alternative metal; hardcore punk; nu metal
- Occupations: Singer; musician; songwriter
- Instruments: Vocals; guitar; percussion
- Years active: 1986–present
- Formerly of: Sepultura; Outface; Musica Diablo

Derrick Leon Green (born January 20, 1971) is an American musician best known as the vocalist of Brazilian heavy metal band Sepultura. He joined the band in 1997 after the departure of founding member Max Cavalera, and was their longest-serving singer for 29 years until their break up in 2026.

== Early life ==
Born in Cleveland, Ohio, Green is the youngest of three children; his sister Renée Green is an artist, writer, and filmmaker. Green's father, Friendly, an electrician, and mother, Gloria, a music teacher, moved the family from inner-city Cleveland to suburban Shaker Heights when Green was 7. "This was my first live interaction with white people," Green later recalled. From an early age, Green wished to travel and live outside the United States; he went to Berlin for a time before moving from New York to São Paulo.

== Career ==
=== Pre-Sepultura ===
Green became a friend and roadie of the already formed thrash metal/hardcore band Outface which formed in 1985. He then joined the band in 1986 at the age of 15 after the departures of their first two singers. The band consisted of guitarist Charlie Garriga (CIV), bassist Frank Cavanagh (Prong and Filter) and drummer Mark Konopka. They recorded two demos, one in 1987 and the other in 1989. They were then offered a recording deal by a friend from New York, Walter Schreifels (Quicksand, Youth of Today, Gorilla Biscuits) for a recording deal to record for his new sub label of Crisis Records for one studio album, Friendly Green (named after Green's father), released in 1992. Stylistically, their music varied between rock, heavy metal and punk with ska elements. Green was credited as Simon Verde on the Outface release; verde means green in Portuguese, Spanish, Italian, and Romanian. With this lineup they toured and played in many places on the east coast and the south of the United States and one tour in Europe.

Once back from the tour in Europe, Green and Garriga decided that they wanted to move to New York City. Cavanagh stayed and later went on to join the band Filter. Konopka also decided to stay and recorded one album with the band Integrity.

In New York, Green and Garriga teamed up with drummer Sammy Siegler (Side by Side, Youth of Today, Judge), bass player Eric Thrice (Orange 9mm), who was replaced by Sara Cox, to form Overfiend. The band was named after the brutal Japanese animated film Legend of the Overfiend. They recorded a three-song demo with the help of Schreifels, the direction was much heavier with influences of metal and heavy rock. Their first show was played in Staten Island opening for Sick of It All. This would be their only show. Garriga and Siegler would leave the band to join and form CIV.

In 1996, Green would start to play guitar and sing with Sara Cox, they would then form the band Alpha Jerk. They later recruited drummer Luke Abby (Warzone, Gorilla Biscuits), who was then replaced by Nick Heller (Sweet Diesel). They would release one self-titled album on Toybox Records. They managed to play a few shows in the New York area and doing a few shows together with the bands Lunachicks and Demonspeed. Two songs were featured on New York's Hardest, Vol. 2 compilation.

=== Sepultura ===
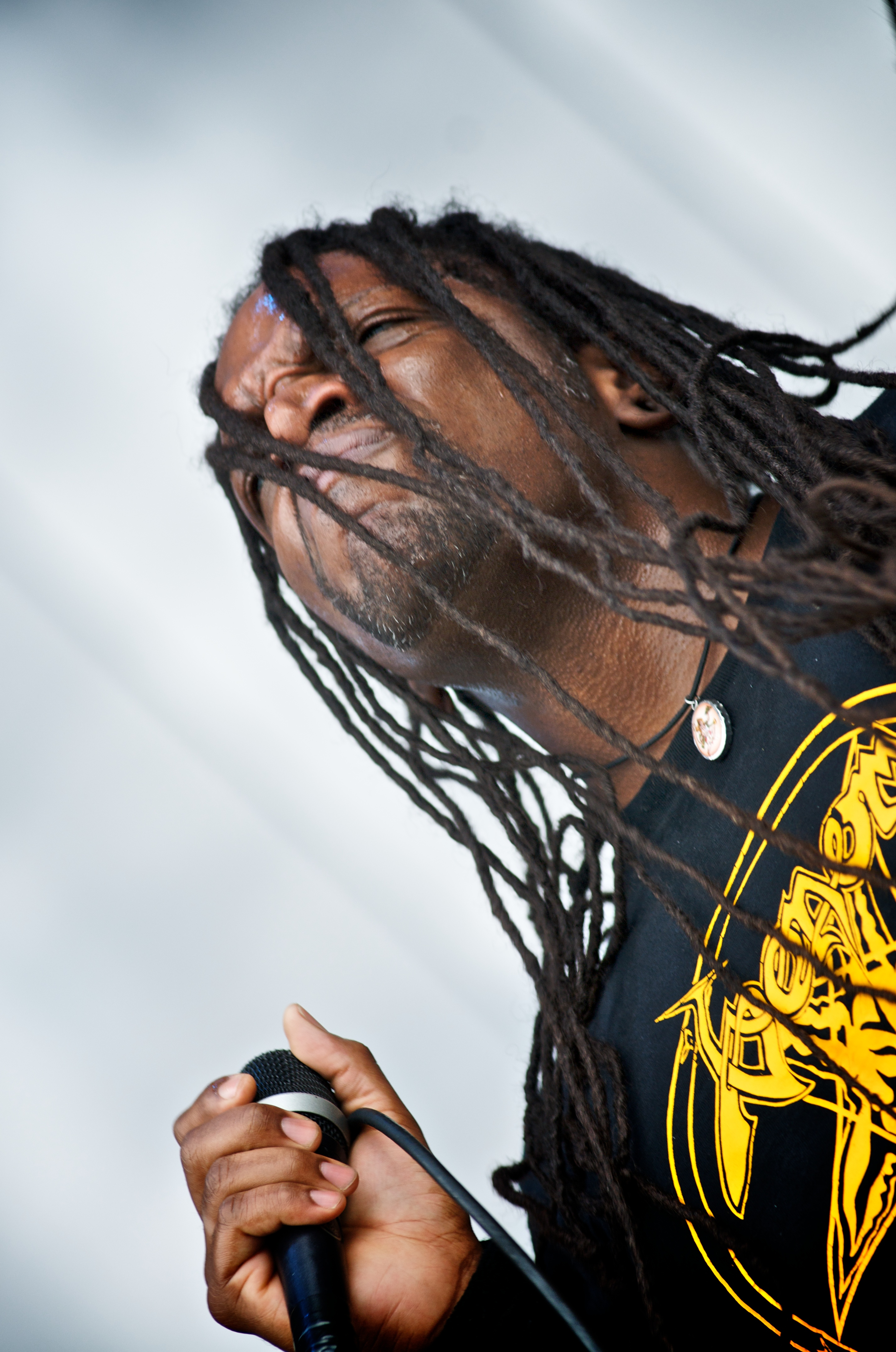
Green performing in 2009

Green was approached in 1997 by A&R rep Mike Gitter from Roadrunner Records. He told him that Sepultura frontman Max Cavalera had left the band in 1996 and they were searching for a new vocalist. He suggested Green try out for the position. Sepultura had recorded one song with no vocals to see what people all around the world could come up with. Green got a hold of the tape from Gitter and he recorded his idea for the song "Choke" and sent it to Brazil. A month later he received a phone call from Sepultura's drummer, Igor Cavalera. He was then asked to fly down to São Paulo, Brazil to meet everyone and audition for the position. Green flew out a week later and met everyone and auditioned for two weeks. Green was asked to come back to Brazil to start recording his first album, Against, with Sepultura.

Most of Against was written before Green entered the band. Against was released in 1998 and the group set out on a world tour. Green moved from New York and decided to live in Amsterdam while on a promo tour. The album was critically and commercially less successful than previous Sepultura albums, as many fans were still coming to terms with the absence of Max Cavalera from the band. AllMusic gave the album 3 stars out of 5, and gave an optimistic note of the band's future by stating that "there are enough flashes of the old Sepultura brilliance to suggest that great things are still to come".

Nation would be the first album that Green would take part in the writing process for, from beginning to end. He decided to move to São Paulo to be closer to the group and work on the new material. Nation, the band's eighth album with Roadrunner Records, was released in 2001 and sold poorly. AllMusic gave the album 3 stars out of 5 and said, "As Green scrapes the lining of his vocal chords through the brash, impassioned tracks, he's singing about more than just 'one tribe, Sepulnation'; he's suggesting something bigger, something worth shouting about and fighting for". In an interview, Derrick said about the album that "every song will be related to the idea of building this idea of a positive nation. We will have our own flag, our own anthem, our own army".

Nation was the group's last studio album with Roadrunner Records, as their contract ran out. The contract had an option for one more album but the group felt the label was not supportive enough. A recording of Max Cavalera's last live show with Sepultura, titled Under a Pale Grey Sky, was released in 2002 by Roadrunner Records, against the wishes of the band.

Revolusongs, an EP of cover songs was released by the band. The EP was exclusively released in Brazil and Japan, but then the band was picked up by record label SPV and Revolusongs was later included as a bonus disc on the digipak edition of Roorback, the next full-length studio album with Green. A collaboration between the video director Ricardo Della Rosa and Green created the idea of the music video of U2's song "Bullet the Blue Sky". It won best photography in the 2003 Brazil MTV music awards show.

Despite Roorback receiving critical acclaim, sales remained low. AllMusic gave the album 4 stars out of 5 and said, "if there are still any lingering doubts about the Green/Sepultura match, 2003's excellent Roorback should put them to rest for good. Green is passionate and focused throughout the album —he has no problem going that extra mile— and the writing is consistently strong".

All the tracks on the DVD Live in São Paulo were recorded on April 3, 2005, at a concert in São Paulo, Brazil. A CD of the same name was also recorded. Both were released on November 8, 2005, through SPV Records. The second DVD features a documentary of the band's career from 1998 on, filmed and co-edited by Green.

Dante XXI was released on March 14, 2006. It is a concept album based on Dante's The Divine Comedy, a book that Green read in high school and suggested to the band for the concept for the album. In "Convicted in Life" video, Green collaborated with the video director Luis Carone for the idea. The video won for best editing in a video and best direction in a video at the Brazil MTV music awards show in 2006.

AllMusic gave the album 3.5 stars out of 5 and said that, "Overall, Dante XXI is easily one of Sepultura's strongest releases to feature Green on vocals". Igor Cavalera left the band after the release of Dante XXI. He was replaced by Brazilian drummer Jean Dolabella who they continued with and toured with for the most part of the Dante XXI tour.

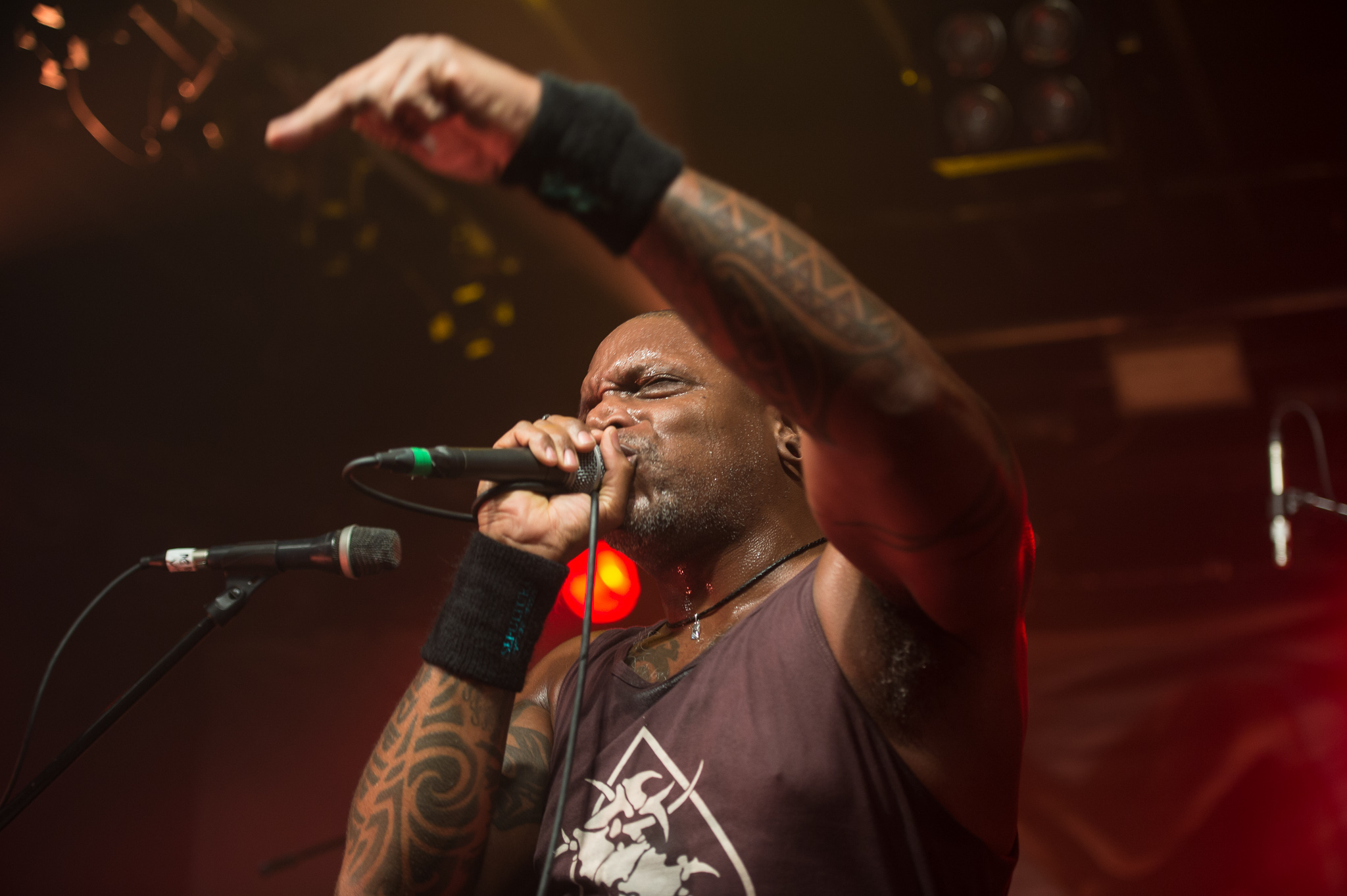
Green with Sepultura in Germany, 2018

Sepultura released the album A-Lex on January 26, 2009. A-Lex is a concept album based on Anthony Burgess' book A Clockwork Orange. AllMusic gave the album 4 stars out of 5 and said that "personnel changes can have a very negative effect on a band, but Sepultura have maintained their vitality all these years – and that vitality is alive and well on the superb A-Lex".

In July 2010, it was announced that Sepultura have signed a deal with Nuclear Blast Records, and will release their first album Kairos for the label in 2011. Roy Z (Judas Priest, Halford, Iron Maiden's Bruce Dickinson, Helloween) was the producer for the new album.

Green remained in Sepultura for three more albums (2013's The Mediator Between Head and Hands Must Be the Heart, 2017's Machine Messiah and 2020's Quadra), and one EP (2026's The Cloud of Unknowing), before the band's retirement in 2026.

=== Musica Diablo ===
Green joined another band, Musica Diablo, in 2008, a thrash metal band with members of Nitrominds, Ação Direta and Dead Fish. On May 28, 2010, the band released their self-titled debut album on both CD and MP3 download. CD Universe said that "Musica Diablo's extreme fast thrash metal, with the characteristic Brazilian style and a strong root into the 1980s veterans made them unique, and the need of recording a proper album was eminent. The band recorded their first album in January 2010 with the well known producer Rafael Ramos in Rio de Janeiro. A month later, Derrick Green recorded his vocals in São Paulo, again under Rafael's production. The result is a killer, blast-in-your-face album with 11 songs of sheer violence and pure Brazilian Thrash Metal!". Green has since left Musica Diablo.

=== Collaborations ===
Green was a guest vocalist on a few CDs including Biohazard's Uncivilization and the soundtrack of the Brazilian movie Lisbela e o Prisioneiro.

Green appeared with Sepultura in a successful ad campaign for Volkswagen that aired nationally throughout Brazil in 2008. The spot said that "it's the first time you've seen Sepultura like this. And a sedan like this one too". This Volkswagen TV spot shows Sepultura playing bossa nova, the opposite of its Heavy Metal style, to say that "you never saw something like this, as you never saw a car like the new Voyage".

Green is working on a three volume book set of his photography and writings due to be released in late 2011/2012. Each volume will be released at different times.

In 2013, Green worked on a side project called Maximum Hedrum.

== Personal life ==
In 2011, when asked about his religious views, Green replied:

I think there is a connection that is missing between nature and people. We're connected. People cannot live without nature. And I feel this is something that is a very powerful inner phase, indisputable and very realistic. And it's in a sense a God in itself, this planet, it's something beautiful and very powerful and gives so much nourishment to its people and everything around us and I feel to be connected with that is something that we need to re-learn. So for me, my religion is this planet and having that connection and trying my best to learn to deal with it.

Green speaks fluent Portuguese with a noticeable American accent. He previously lived in Carapicuíba, São Paulo, but now lives in Los Angeles.

Green is a vegan. He has been a vegetarian since 1986. He made this publicly clear in a PETA video interview regarding Sepultura's 2006 video of the song "Convicted in Life". He stated in the interview that the subject of this video is that some kind of "karma" is inflicted on those that damage the environment and its wildlife.

== Discography ==
- Outface – Friendly Green (1992)
- Alpha Jerk – S/T (1996)
- Various – New York's Hardest, Vol. 2 Comp (1998)
- Sepultura – Against (1998)
- Sepultura – Nation (2001)
- Sepultura – Revolusongs (2002)
- Sepultura – Roorback (2003)
- Sepultura – Live in São Paulo (2005)
- Sepultura – Dante XXI (2006)
- Sepultura – A-Lex (2009)
- Música Diablo – Música Diablo (2010)
- Sepultura – Kairos (2011)
- Maximum Hedrum – S/T (2013)
- Sepultura – The Mediator Between Head and Hands Must Be the Heart (2013)
- Sepultura – Metal Veins – Alive in Rio (2014)
- Sepultura – Machine Messiah (2017)
- Sepultura – Quadra (2020)
- Sepultura – Sepulquarta (2021)
- Sepultura – The Cloud of Unknowing (2026)
