= Kairos (album) =

Studio album by Sepultura
- Released: June 24, 2011
- Recorded: December 2010–March 2011
- Studios: Trama Studios, São Paulo, Brazil
- Genres: Groove metal; thrash metal; death metal
- Length: 45:51
- Labels: Nuclear Blast, Tribus Music (Brazil)
- Producer: Roy Z

Sepultura chronology
A-Lex (2009)	Kairos (2011)	The Mediator Between Head and Hands Must Be the Heart (2013)

Kairos is the twelfth studio album by Brazilian heavy metal band Sepultura. It was released on June 24, 2011 by independent German record label Nuclear Blast Records. This is the band's first release on the label, marking their first album not released on SPV/Steamhammer since 2001's Nation.

== Background and recording ==
On July 6, 2010, it was announced that Sepultura were signed with Nuclear Blast Records, and would release their first album for the label in 2011. By the end of 2010, the band had begun writing new material and entered the studio to begin recording their twelfth album with producer Roy Z (Judas Priest, Halford, Iron Maiden's Bruce Dickinson, Helloween). Recording sessions for Kairos took place from December 2010 to March 2011 at Trama Studios in São Paulo, Brazil, the same studio where its 2009 predecessor A-Lex was recorded.

On March 1, 2011, it was announced that Sepultura had completed recording their album, which was tentatively due in May 2011. Days after the album was finished, Sepultura announced on March 4, 2011 that the album would be called Kairos and would be released around that late spring or early summer. Kairos was Sepultura's last album recorded with drummer Jean Dolabella, as he left the band five months after its release.

=== Concept ===
Speaking of how the band came up with the Kairos title, guitarist Andreas Kisser said:

The whole theme of the album is the concept of the time, and the title reflects that — it's like one concept of time which is not chronological, from one to two; it's like an instant in time, it's a special time of change... Everyone's life is written by [their] choices — you have many 'kairos' moments, like if you go [from] point A [to point] B [to point] C, you are driven by your choices or your guidance; you have to go either one way or the other. And that's the kind of time we talked about — not about aging or getting old or going back [in time]; it's just [about those important] moments that can change everything.

According to the guitarist, the concept had to do with Sepultura's 26-year-old history and the changes inside and outside the band. "It's a collection of 'kairos' that [got us] here. It's being inspired by our own biography, but mostly [focusing] on what Sepultura is today," he added.

== Reception ==
Professional ratings
Review scores
Source	Rating
About.com	4/5 stars
AllMusic	3/5 stars
The A.V. Club	C−
Knac	3/5 stars
Metal Archives	(favourable)

Kairos was well received by music critics and fans. It sold over 2,500 copies in the United States in its first week of release and topped the CMJ Loud Rock chart for three weeks. The album charted in Germany, Austria and Switzerland. The band toured Europe, the US, Canada and Brazil for the Kairos World Tour.

The song "Mask" is a downloadable content in the 2012 video game Twisted Metal.

== Track listing ==
All lyrics are written by Andreas Kisser and Derrick Green, except where noted; all music is composed by Andreas Kisser, Jean Dolabella, and Derrick Green, except where noted.

No.	Title	Writer(s)	Length
1.	"Spectrum"		4:03
2.	"Kairos"		3:37
3.	"Relentless"		3:36
4.	"2011"		0:30
5.	"Just One Fix" (Ministry cover)	Al Jourgensen; Paul Barker; Bill Rieflin; Michael Balch	3:33
6.	"Dialog"		4:57
7.	"Mask"		4:31
8.	"1433"		0:31
9.	"Seethe"		2:27
10.	"Born Strong"		4:40
11.	"Embrace the Storm"		3:32
12.	"5772"		0:29
13.	"No One Will Stand"		3:17
14.	"Structure Violence (Azzes)"		5:39
15.	"4648"		0:28
Total length:			45:51

Deluxe edition
No.	Title	Writer(s)	Length
16.	"Firestarter" (The Prodigy cover)	The Prodigy	4:28
17.	"Point of No Return"		3:27

== DVD ==
The deluxe edition also comes with a bonus DVD. Over its 50:16 running length, the film shows the band in the rehearsal room running through the songs together, and in the studio recording the album. It also contains interviews with all the band members, and producer, engineer and mixer Roy Z.

== Credits ==
Sepultura

- Derrick Green – vocals
- Andreas Kisser – guitars
- Paulo Jr. – bass
- Jean Dolabella – drums, percussion

Additional personnel

- Les Tambours du Bronx – percussion on "Structure Violence (Azzes)"
- Roy Z – production, engineering, mixing
- Maor Appelbaum – mastering engineering
- Paulo Chagas – assistant
- Ronaldo Frige – assistant
- Jon Mattox – sound design, treatments

== Charts ==
Chart (2011)	Peak Position
Austrian Albums (Ö3 Austria)	75
French Albums (SNEP)	87
German Albums (Offizielle Top 100)	49
Swiss Albums (Schweizer Hitparade)	45
UK Independent Albums (Official Charts)	44
UK Rock & Metal Albums (Official Charts)	28
US Independent Albums (Billboard)	48
