= Paulo Jr. =

Brazilian bassist

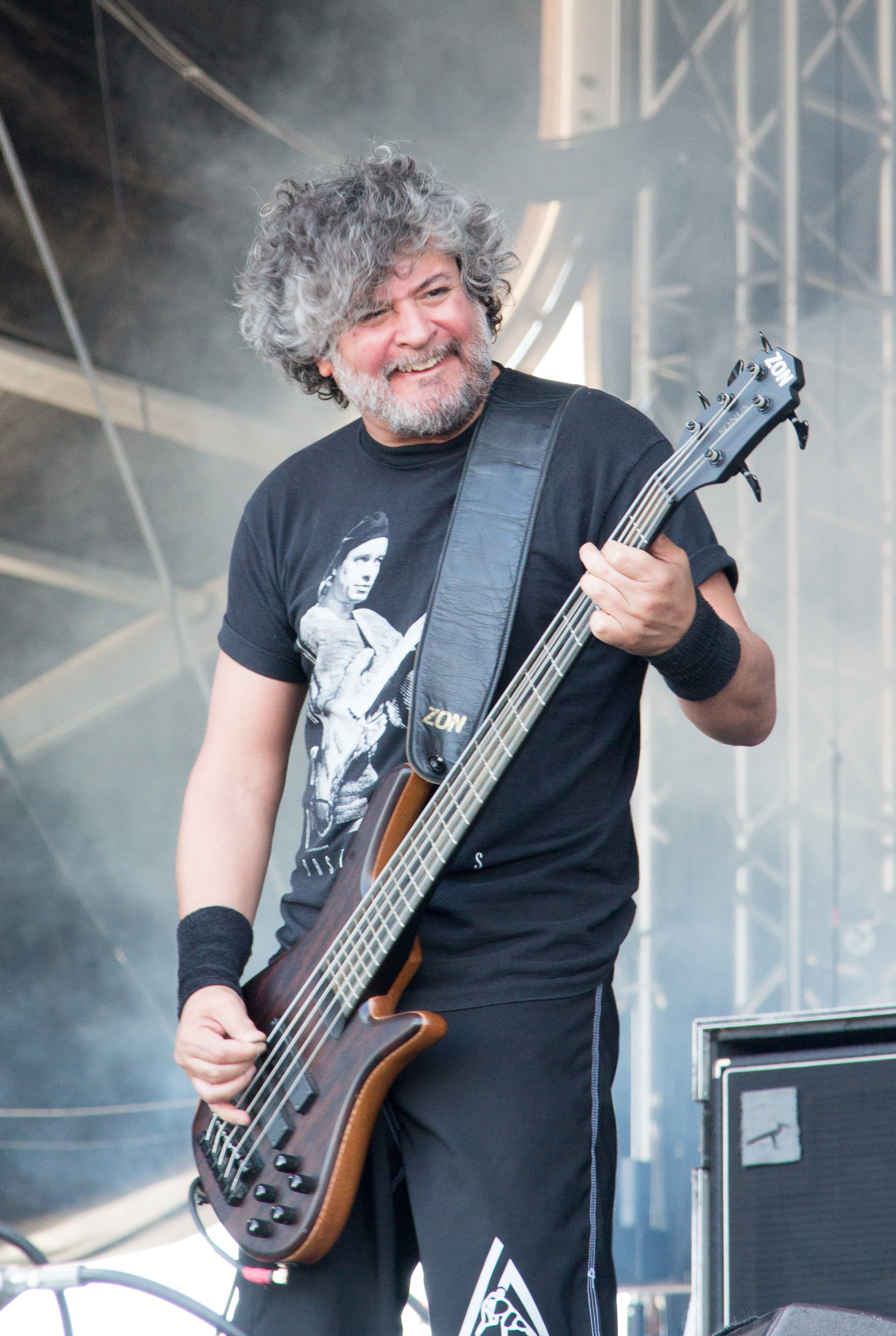
- Paulo Jr. at Nova Rock Festival in 2014

Background information
- Also known as: Paulo Jr., Paulo Destructor
- Born: Paulo Xisto Pinto Júnior; April 30, 1969 (age 57); Belo Horizonte, Minas Gerais, Brazil
- Genres: Groove metal; thrash metal; death metal; alternative metal
- Occupation: Musician
- Instrument: Bass
- Years active: 1983–present
- Member of: Cultura Tres; The Unabomber Files
- Formerly of: Sepultura
- Website: sepultura.com.br

Paulo Xisto Pinto Júnior is a Brazilian musician best known as the bassist for heavy metal band Sepultura. He joined Sepultura after Roberto Raffan left the band in 1984, becoming the band's second bassist. He was the longest-serving member of Sepultura, in which (following the departure of drummer Igor Cavalera in 2006) there were no remaining original members left.

== Early life and influences ==
Paulo Jr. was born in Belo Horizonte, where he grew up with two brothers and a younger sister. His father was a lawyer. He received his first bass guitar, a white Giannini, when he was 15. In an interview, Paulo Jr. commended his parents for supporting the band in its early days.

"The support of the parents was one of the keys to our success. We had an empty room and my parents not only lent the space, but also the car to carry the equipment and made lunch for everyone when we were rehearsing."

His influences include Steve Harris, Geddy Lee, Geezer Butler, Cliff Burton and Gene Simmons, though Paulo plays bass with a guitar pick rather than his fingers.

== Career ==
=== Sepultura ===
In 1984, Paulo Jr. met the Cavalera brothers in the Santa Teresa neighbourhood of Belo Horizonte through a common friend. He joined Sepultura after the departure of the band's previous bass player, Roberto Raffan. Paulo Jr. played his first concert at the Ideal Club in Santa Teresa. He is their longest serving member. However, while he was a part of the band in their early years and performed live with them, Paulo had not performed on any Sepultura album until Chaos A.D. (1993); Andreas Kisser did both guitar and bass duties on their albums prior to Chaos A.D., except Morbid Visions (1986), which featured Jairo Guedz handling both roles. Paulo Jr. remained in Sepultura until the band's breakup in 2026, and for 42 years, was their longest-serving member.

=== Cultura Tres ===
In 2019, Paulo Jr. joined the brothers Alejandro Londoño Montoya and Juan M De Ferrari Montoya to bring back to life the sludge / thrash metal band Cultura Tres. In 2023, the band released their full length Camino de Brujos supported with three music video clips for the songs "The World And Its Lies", "Proxy War", and "The Land". Paulo Jr. is currently touring with Cultura Tres with dates announced both in Europe and South America.

=== The Unabomber Files ===
In 2009, Paulo Jr. joined with Alan Wallace and André Márcio of Eminence and Vladimir Korg of Chakal to form the band The Unabomber Files. In 2013, the group released a six-song EP and a teaser for the music video of the song "Buried In My Bunker".

=== Guest appearances ===
In 2007, Paulo Jr. played bass guitar on Sayowa's second album. In 2013, he made a guest appearance on Eminence's fourth album, The Stalker, providing extra bass accompaniment.

== Personal life ==
Paulo Jr.'s hobbies include jiu jitsu and soccer. He is an avid supporter of soccer club Clube Atlético Mineiro. He currently lives in Belo Horizonte.

=== Charity work ===
Since 1999, Paulo Jr. has organised a series of annual soccer charity games between former Brazilian players, television artists, musicians and the band members. The games took place at the Estádio Municipal Castor Cifuentes in Nova Lima, Brazil, near Belo Horizonte. The spectators were asked to donate a pound of food and the gathered donations were given to local charities.

In April 2008, Paulo Jr. was decorated with the Medalha da Inconfidência. This decoration was created in 1952 by the former Brazilian president Juscelino Kubitschek to pay homage to individuals who contributed in the development of the state of Minas Gerais and the country. The ceremony took place in Ouro Preto, hosted by the then Governor of Minas Gerais, Aécio Neves.

== Discography ==
=== Sepultura ===
- 1985: Bestial Devastation (EP) (credit only)
- 1986: Morbid Visions (credit only)
- 1987: Schizophrenia (credit only)
- 1989: Beneath the Remains (credit only)
- 1991: Arise (credit only)
- 1993: Chaos A.D.
- 1996: Roots
- 1998: Against
- 2001: Nation
- 2002: Revolusongs (EP)
- 2003: Roorback
- 2006: Dante XXI
- 2009: A-Lex
- 2011: Kairos
- 2013: The Mediator Between Head and Hands Must Be the Heart
- 2017: Machine Messiah
- 2020: Quadra
- 2026: The Cloud of Unknowing (EP)

=== Cultura Tres ===
- 2023: Camino de Brujos

=== The Unabomber Files ===
- 2013: The Unabomber Files

=== Guest appearances ===
Eminence

- 2013: The Stalker

Nine Red Moons

- 2026: Sumerian Songs for the Dead
