= Gloria (Brazilian band) =

Brazilian musical group

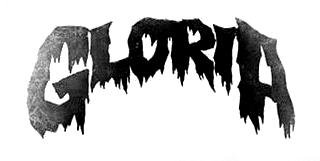

Background information
- Origin: São Paulo City, São Paulo, Brazil
- Genres: Metalcore; post-hardcore; screamo; alternative metal; emo
- Years active: 2002–present
- Label: Universal
- Members: Mi Vieira; Peres Kenji; Thiago Abreu; Vini Rodrigues
- Past members: Yuri Nishida; Gee Rocha; Guga; Thiba; Johnny; Rafa; Fil; Eloy Casagrande; Ricky Machado; João Milliet; Elliot Reis; Leandro Ferreira
- Website: gloriaoficial.com

Gloria is a Brazilian metalcore band formed in 2002 in São Paulo. The group currently consists of lead vocalist Mi Vieira, drummer Leandro Ferreira, guitarist/vocalist Vini Rodrigues, guitarist Giu Daga and bassist Tom Vicentini.

== Band members ==
=== Current members ===
- Mi Vieira – unclean vocals (2002–present)
- Leandro Ferreira – drums (2016–present)
- Vini Rodrigues – guitar, clean vocals (2020–present)
- Giu Daga – guitar (2026–present)
- Tom Vicentini – bass guitar (2026–present)

=== Former members ===
- Guga – guitar (2002–2003)
- Denis Mendes – drums (2002–2004)
- Yuri Nishida – clean vocals (2002–2005), bass guitar (2002–2003), guitar (2003–2005)
- Gee Rocha – guitar (2003–2006), clean vocals (2005–2006)
- Thiba – guitar (2005–2006)
- Rafa – drums (2004–2007)
- Fil – drums (2007–2011)
- Eloy Casagrande – drums (2011–2012)
- Johnny Bonafé – bass guitar (2003–2013)
- Ricky Machado – drums (2012–2015)
- João Milliet – bass guitar (2013–2016)
- Elliot Reis – guitar, clean vocals (2006–2020)
- Thiago Abreu – bass guitar (2016–2020)
- Peres Kenji – guitar (2006–present)

== Discography ==
=== Studio albums ===
Title	Album details
O Fim é Uma Certeza	Released: 2005; Label: DaLaranjaaoCaos; Format: CD, DL
Nueva	Released: 15 June 2006; Label: Urubuz; Format: CD, DL
Gloria	Released: 14 April 2009; Label: Universal; Format: CD, DL
(Re)Nascido	Released: 23 May 2012; Label: Self-released; Format: CD, DL
Acima do Céu	Released: 26 April 2019; Label: Self-released; Format: CD, DL

=== Live albums ===
Title	Album details
(Re)Nascido em Chamas	Released: 24 December 2013; Label: Self-released; Format: DVD, DL

=== Extended plays ===
Title	EP details
V (Quinto)	Released: 2018; Format: CD, DL; Label: Self-released

=== Singles ===
Year	Name	Chart	Album
Year	Name	BRA	Album
2004	"Piano Perfeito"	—	O Fim é uma Certeza
2005	"Ela e a Tempestade"	—	O Fim é uma Certeza
2006	"Janeiro de 2006"	—	Nueva
2006	"Asas Fracas"	—	Nueva
2008	"Anemia"	—	Gloria
2009	"Minha Paz"	11	Gloria
2009	"Agora é Minha Vez"	49	Gloria
2010	"Tudo Outra Vez"	21	Gloria
2010	"Vai Pagar Caro Por Me Conhecer"	32	Gloria
2012	"Sangue"	97	(Re)Nascido
2012	"A Arte de Fazer Inimigos"	27	(Re)Nascido
2012	"Horizontes" (feat. Lucas Silveira)	37	(Re)Nascido
2013	"Bicho do Mato"	30	(Re)Nascido
2013	"Presságio"	32	(Re)Nascido
2016	"A Cada Dia"	—	V (Quinto)
2017	"A Chama"	—	V (Quinto)
2017	"Previsões"	—	V (Quinto)
2018	"Deixa Eu Viver Mais"	—	V (Quinto)
2018	"A Luz"	—	V (Quinto)
2018	"Voa"	—	Acima do Céu
2019	"Acima do Céu"	—	Acima do Céu
2019	"Karma"	—	Acima do Céu
2023	"Coração Codificado"	—	Non-album single
2023	"Convencer"	—	Non-album single

=== Music videos ===
- (2006) Janeiro de 2006
- (2007) Asas Fracas
- (2008) Anemia
- (2008) Asas Fracas
- (2009) Minha Paz
- (2009) Onde Estiver
- (2009) Agora é Minha Vez
- (2010) Tudo Outra Vez
- (2010) Vai Pagar Caro Por Me Conhecer
- (2012) Sangue
- (2012) A Arte de Fazer Inimigos
- (2012) Horizontes (feat. Lucas Silveira)
- (2016) A Cada Dia

== Awards ==
Year	Award	Category	Result
2009	Prêmio Multishow de Música Brasileira	Discovery of the year	Nomination
2009	MTV Video Music Brazil	Discovery of the year	Nomination
2010	Prêmio Rock Show	Show of the year	Win
2011	Prêmio Rock Show	Artist of the year	Win
