= Eloy Casagrande =

Brazilian drummer (born 1991)

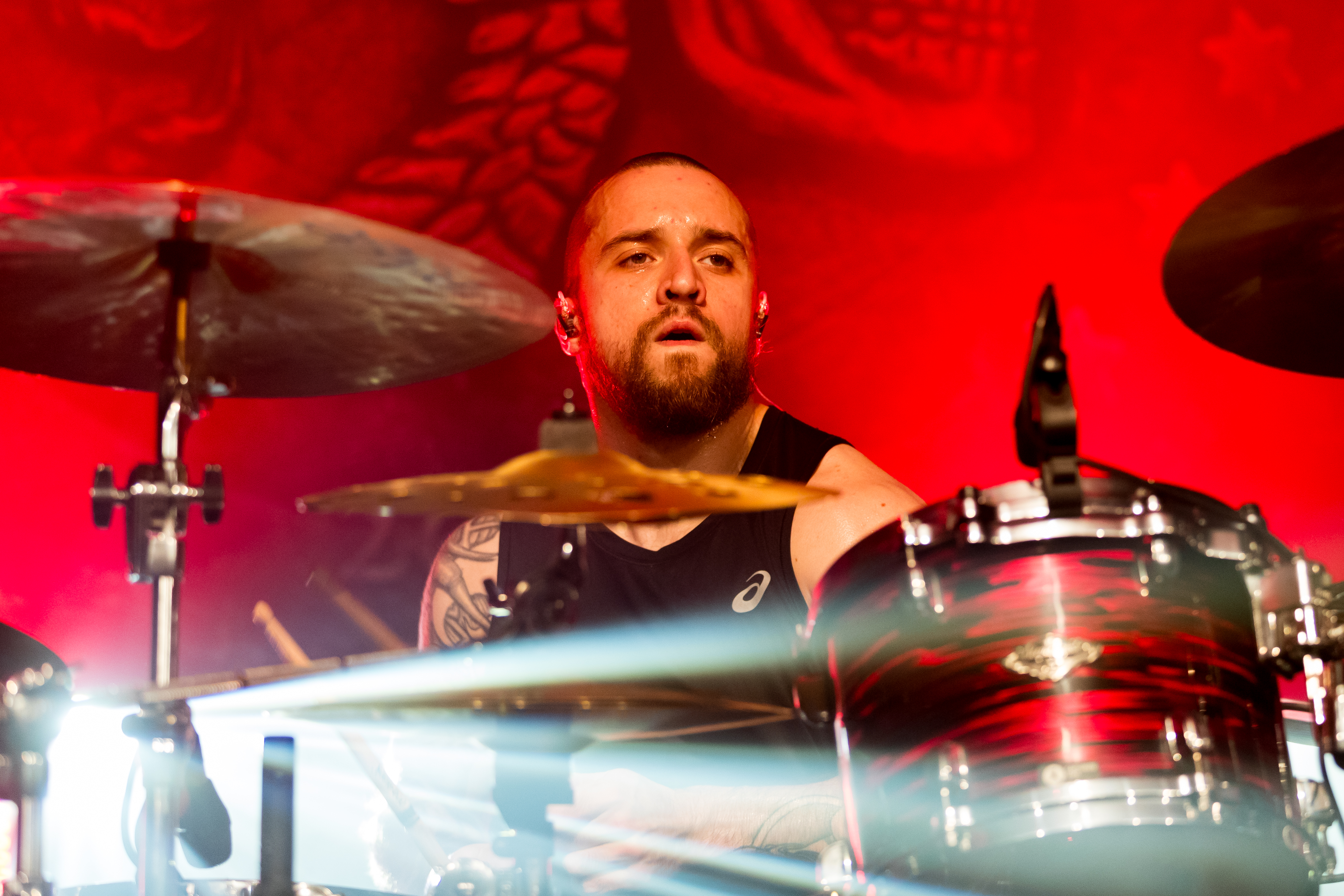
- Casagrande performing in 2023

Background information
- Born: 29 January 1991 (age 35); Santo André, São Paulo, Brazil
- Genres: Heavy metal; thrash metal; metalcore; nu metal
- Occupation: Musician
- Instruments: Drums; percussion
- Years active: 2004–present
- Member of: Casagrande & Hanysz; Slipknot
- Formerly of: Andre Matos; Gloria; Sepultura

Eloy Casagrande (born 29 January 1991) is a Brazilian musician who has been the drummer of American heavy metal band Slipknot since 2024. He was previously the drummer of Brazilian metal band Sepultura, and is also part of musical project Casagrande & Hanysz.

== Biography ==
Casagrande began playing at age seven, when he got a toy drum from his mother; after a year, he got a real drum kit. He was notably taught by fellow Brazilian drummer Aquiles Priester. In 2004, at age 13, he was the winner of the Batuka International Drummer Fest, sponsored by Vera Figueiredo. Later, Casagrande also won Modern Drummer's Undiscovered Drummer Contest 2005 in New Jersey, and the following year, toured the United States.

Casagrande joined Sepultura in November 2011, replacing Jean Dolabella. He recorded three albums with the band before his departure in February 2024 and is the second youngest member of Sepultura, with his replacement Greyson Nekrutman being 11 years his junior. Casagrande is also known for his time with power metal vocalist Andre Matos, Brazilian Christian metal band Iahweh and post-hardcore/metalcore band Gloria, and has a project called Casagrande & Hanysz with guitarist João Hanysz.

In April 2024, Slipknot officially confirmed that Casagrande would be replacing Jay Weinberg as the band's drummer. His first show with the band was on April 25, 2024, at Pappy & Harriet's Palace in California, USA. In the same year he joined the band, Eloy Casagrande was voted Best Metal Drummer in Modern Drummer magazine's 2024 Readers' Poll.

== Discography ==
=== With Sepultura ===
- The Mediator Between Head and Hands Must Be the Heart (2013)
- Machine Messiah (2017)
- Quadra (2020)
- SepulQuarta (live album, 2021)

=== With others ===
- Neblim with Iahweh (2008)
- Mentalize with Andre Matos (2009)
- Landscape Revolution with Aclla (2010)
- A Quarta Ponte with 2OIS (2011)
- (Re)Nascido with Gloria (2012)
- Deserto with Iahweh (2014)
- "Over Dee Moon"/"5 Years thinking outside your Box" with Daniel Piquê (2014)
- LIMINAL with Casagrande & Hanysz (2024)
- Arsenal with Slipknot (2026)
