= Roorback =

Studio album by Sepultura
- Released: May 27, 2003
- Recorded: 2002–2003
- Studio: AR Studios (Rio de Janeiro, Brazil); Guilas Studios (Sao Paulo, Brazil)
- Genre: Groove metal; nu metal
- Length: 56:44
- Label: SPV – Universal (Brazil)
- Producer: Steve Evetts

Sepultura chronology
Revolusongs (2003)	Roorback (2003)	Live in São Paulo (2005)

Roorback is the ninth studio album by Brazilian heavy metal band Sepultura, released in 2003, through SPV Records.

== Album information ==
The songs "Mind War" and "Bullet the Blue Sky" were released as singles and music videos. The digipak version (released everywhere except the United States) contains the Revolusongs EP and the video for "Bullet the Blue Sky". The album title refers to the "Roorback forgery".

== Reception ==
Professional ratings
Review scores
Source	Rating
AllMusic	4/5 stars
Chronicles of Chaos	(8.5/10)
Metal Storm	(7/10)
PopMatters	(favorable)

Sales were down from their previous albums featuring Derrick Green on vocals. However, Roorback received positive reviews and placed on Billboard's Independent Music Chart at #17, with first-week sales of 4,000. SoundScan reported on March 20, 2007 that Roorback had sold over 75,000 units in the United States.

Allmusic's Alex Henderson gave the album 4 stars out of 5 and said that "unrest and political corruption are recurring themes on Roorback", and "the songs that Sepultura wrote paint a consistently bleak and troubling picture of the world". Adrien Begrand from PopMatters called Roorback "their strongest effort in years" and "their most consistent and energized album since Roots".

== Track listing ==
All lyrics are written by Andreas Kisser, Derrick Green and Igor Cavalera, except track 14 by Bono; all music is composed by Sepultura, except track 14 by U2.

No.	Title	Length
1.	"Come Back Alive"	3:06
2.	"Godless"	4:22
3.	"Apes of God"	3:36
4.	"More of the Same"	3:59
5.	"Urge"	3:17
6.	"Corrupted"	2:33
7.	"As It Is"	4:26
8.	"Mind War"	3:00
9.	"Leech"	2:24
10.	"The Rift"	2:57
11.	"Bottomed Out"	4:35
12.	"Activist"	1:54
13.	"Outro" (uncredited)	11:39
Total length:		56:44

Bonus track
No.	Title	Length
14.	"Bullet the Blue Sky" (U2 cover)	4:31

The digipak version includes a second disc which contains Revolusongs, but excludes the Metallica cover from the original EP.

On the digipack CD version, Outro ends at 1:22. There is silence from 1:23 to 8:22. Starting at 8:23 is a hidden track.

== Credits ==
- Derrick Green - vocals
- Andreas Kisser - guitars
- Paulo Jr. - bass
- Igor Cavalera - drums, percussion
- João Barone - guest appearance
- Sepultura - production
- Steve Evetts - production, engineering, mixing
- Derek Hess - illustrations
- George Marino - mastering
- Milky - assistant engineering
- Luciano Tarta - assistant engineering
- Leo Shogun - assistant engineering
- Fabiano Zowa - executive engineering
- Jacob Bannon - graphic design

== Charts ==
Chart (2003)	Peak position
French Albums (SNEP)	77
German Albums (Offizielle Top 100)	46
Swiss Albums (Schweizer Hitparade)	69
UK Rock & Metal Albums (OCC)	19
US Independent Albums (Billboard)	17

Chart (2024)	Peak position
Portuguese Albums (AFP)	40
