= A-Lex =

Studio album by Sepultura
- Released: January 23, 2009
- Recorded: 2008
- Studios: Trama Studios, São Paulo, Brazil
- Genres: Groove metal; thrash metal; death metal
- Length: 54:19
- Labels: SPV, Atração (Brazil)
- Producers: Stanley Soares; Sepultura

Sepultura chronology
The Best of Sepultura (2006)	A-Lex (2009)	Kairos (2011)

A-Lex is the eleventh studio album by Brazilian heavy metal band Sepultura. It was released on January 23, 2009 by independent German record label SPV. This is the first album featuring drummer Jean Dolabella, since the departure of Igor Cavalera in 2006, and their first album without any original member.

This is the second concept album released by Sepultura, following 2006's Dante XXI, which was based on Dante Alighieri's The Divine Comedy. A-Lex is based on the 1962 novel A Clockwork Orange by Anthony Burgess, which was adapted into a film version by Stanley Kubrick in 1971.

== Album information ==
The album was recorded in São Paulo at Trama Studios and mixed at Mega Studios during 2008, since February through the process of composition until August when the band finished the mixing process and revealed the track listing and album title.

Guitarist Andreas Kisser stated about the influences obtained from Burgess work:

We will write our soundtrack for this story and Burgess' life will be an inspiration also to write the music, lyrics and for the artwork.

The title is a pun on the main character from the novel, Alex, and the Latin for "without law": a (without) + lex (law); presumably referring to how Alex and his companions behaved.

A-Lex is available in three versions: a deluxe digipak with an embossed cover, a regular jewel case and on a vinyl gate-fold LP. On January 16, 2009, the album was released for exclusive listening on last.fm.

== Music videos ==
Two music videos have been made for the album. The first, "We've Lost You!", was filmed in São Paulo, Brazil, and was released in February 2009. A video for "What I Do!" was released in May 2009. Sepultura performed on the A-Lex World Tour 2009 in Europe and North America.

== Reception ==
Professional ratings
Review scores
Source	Rating
About.com	3.5/5 stars
AllMusic	4/5 stars
Blistering	(7.5/10)
Glide Magazine	4/5 stars
Metal Underground	3.5/5 stars
MetalSucks	(3/5)
Record Collector	3/5 stars
Rock Sound	(8/10)

A-Lex received positive reviews. New drummer Jean Dolabella, who replaced Igor Cavalera, was well received by fans and media. AllMusic gave A-Lex 4 stars out of 5 and called it a "vicious, loud sledgehammer of an album". Alternative Press (p. 108) gave it 3.5 stars out of 5 and said, "A-Lex deftly fuses the band's many stylistic phases, from the thrash and death metal that launched their career to later explorations of punk, hardcore, groove metal and even tribal rhythms." Record Collector (p. 103) gave it 3 stars out of 5 and said, "Much closer to a live, hardcore punk sound than the refined digital crunch of their previous records... As ever with Sepultura, Kisser's slick riffage and the visceral drums are the point."

A-Lex sold 5,000 copies in its first week of release in Brazil and 1,600 in its first week of release in the United States. It was considered by the Brazilian edition of Rolling Stone as one of the Top 25 Brazilian albums of 2012.

== Track listing ==
All tracks are written by Sepultura except "Ludwig Van", based on Ludwig van Beethoven's Symphony No. 9, and "Paradox", co-written by Lucas Kater, who won a contest hosted by Sepultura to include lyrics written by a fan in a song on the album.

No.	Title	Length
1.	"A-Lex I"	1:53
2.	"Moloko Mesto"	2:09
3.	"Filthy Rot"	2:45
4.	"We've Lost You!"	4:13
5.	"What I Do!"	2:01
6.	"A-Lex II"	2:18
7.	"The Treatment"	3:23
8.	"Metamorphosis"	3:01
9.	"Sadistic Values"	6:50
10.	"Forceful Behavior"	2:27
11.	"Conform"	1:54
12.	"A-Lex III"	2:03
13.	"The Experiment"	3:28
14.	"Strike"	3:40
15.	"Enough Said"	1:36
16.	"Ludwig Van"	5:29
17.	"A-Lex IV"	2:46
18.	"Paradox"	2:15
Total length:		54:19

== Personnel ==
- Derrick Green – vocals
- Andreas Kisser – guitars
- Paulo Jr. – bass
- Jean Dolabella – drums, percussion

== Charts ==
Chart (2009)	Peak position
Austrian Albums (Ö3 Austria)	53
French Albums (SNEP)	150
German Albums (Offizielle Top 100)	82
Swiss Albums (Schweizer Hitparade)	68
UK Rock & Metal Albums (Official Charts)	22
US Independent Albums (Billboard)	48
