= Nation (Sepultura album) =

Studio album by Sepultura
- Released: 20 March 2001
- Recorded: 2000–2001
- Studio: AR Studios, Rio de Janeiro; Ouvir Studios, São Paulo; Magic Shop, New York City; Coyote Studios, Brooklyn; Millbrook Studio, Helsinki
- Genre: Groove metal; nu metal
- Length: 52:18
- Label: Roadrunner
- Producer: Sepultura; Steve Evetts; Hiili Hiilesmaa (track 15 only)

Sepultura chronology
Against (1998)	Nation (2001)	Under a Pale Grey Sky (2002)

Nation is the eighth studio album by Brazilian heavy metal band Sepultura, released in 2001 through Roadrunner Records. Nation features guest appearances from artists such as Hatebreed singer Jamey Jasta, Dead Kennedys singer Jello Biafra, Ill Niño singer Cristian Machado, Ratos de Porão frontman João Gordo, and Apocalyptica.

According to the official site, a video for "One Man Army" was scheduled to be filmed at the end of August 2001. However, due to a lack of support from Roadrunner Records, the video was never made. Sepultura blamed Roadrunner for not promoting the album and left for SPV in 2002.

== Reception ==
Professional ratings
Aggregate scores
Source	Rating
Metacritic	(69/100)
Review scores
Source	Rating
AllMusic	3/5 stars
Alternative Press	4/5 stars
Blabbermouth.net	(8/10)
Chronicles of Chaos	(9.5/10)
Dotmusic	4/5 stars
NME	(6/10)
Q	3/5 stars
Rolling Stone	(average)

The album received better reviews than Against, but sold fewer copies. As of April 2002, Nation has sold over 55,700 copies in the U.S. and went gold in Brazil.

Q magazine (5/01, p. 118) – 3 stars out of 5 – "A clutch of crowd-pleasingly brutal anthems...with a return to the more exploratory approach of old....the faithful will not be disappointed."

Alternative Press (5/01, p. 63) – 4 out of 5 – "There are plenty of touchstones to [their] days of headbanger hegemony....[new singer] Derrick Green's heightened tunefulness along with the broadened emotional resonance...should relate to an enlarged fanbase."

NME (3/31/01, p. 31) – 6 out of 10 – "Fiercely political and uncomprimisongly direct....it's taut and tense and if you buy it quick you'll get to hear their logic-defying cover of Bauhaus' 'Bela Lugosi's Dead'."

== Track listing ==
No.	Title	Lyrics	Music	Length
1.	"Sepulnation"	Igor Cavalera; Derrick Green	Andreas Kisser; I. Cavalera	4:20
2.	"Revolt"	Kisser	Kisser; I. Cavalera	0:56
3.	"Border Wars"	Green; Kisser	Kisser; I. Cavalera; Green	5:10
4.	"One Man Army"	Cavalera	Kisser; Green; I. Cavalera	5:27
5.	"Vox Populi"	Kisser	Kisser; I. Cavalera	3:41
6.	"The Ways of Faith"	Kisser; Green	Kisser; I. Cavalera; Green	4:53
7.	"Uma Cura"	Kisser; Green	Kisser; I. Cavalera	3:14
8.	"Who Must Die?"	Green; Kisser	Kisser; I. Cavalera	2:58
9.	"Saga"	Kisser	Kisser; I. Cavalera	4:37
10.	"Tribe to a Nation" (feat. Dr. Israel)	Green	Kisser; Green; I. Cavalera	2:48
11.	"Politricks" (feat. Jello Biafra of Dead Kennedys)	Kisser; Jello Biafra	Kisser; I. Cavalera; Green	4:14
12.	"Human Cause" (feat. Jamey Jasta of Hatebreed)	Kisser	Kisser; I. Cavalera	0:57
13.	"Reject"	Green	Green; Kisser; I. Cavalera	2:59
14.	"Water"	Kisser; Green	Kisser; Green	2:44
15.	"Valtio" (instrumental, feat. Apocalyptica)		Kisser; Eicca Toppinen	3:20
Total length:				52:18

Bonus tracks on digipak, Japan, Brazil, Mexico & Colombia
No.	Title	Lyrics	Music	Length
16.	"Bela Lugosi's Dead" (Bauhaus cover)	Daniel Ash; Kevin Dompe; David Haskins; Peter Murphy	Ash; Dompe; Haskins; Murphy	4:09
17.	"Annihilation" (feat. Cristian Machado of Ill Niño) (Crucifix cover)	Crucifix	Crucifix	1:31
18.	"Rise Above" (feat. João Gordo of Ratos de Porão) (Black Flag cover)	Greg Ginn	Ginn	2:01
19.	"Revolt" (demo)	Kisser	Kisser; I. Cavalera	3:49
20.	"Roots Bloody Roots" (live)	Max Cavalera	M. Cavalera; Kisser; Paulo Jr.; I. Cavalera	3:44

== Credits ==
=== Sepultura ===
- Derrick Green – vocals
- Andreas Kisser – guitars
- Paulo Jr. – bass
- Igor Cavalera – drums, percussion

=== Other personnel ===
"Border Wars"

- Eduardo Marsola – spoken word
- Mother Teresa – quoted citation

"The Ways of Faith"

- Inder J. Kohli – spoken word
- Dalai Lama Mahatma Gandhi – quoted citation

"Saga"

- Marinho Nobre – intro sample

"Uma Cura"

- Marinho – additional bass, also co-composition on (3, 6 & 10)
- Krztoff (Chris Liggio) – programming
- Steve Revitte – assisting mixing, also on "Saga" (at RPM Studios, New York City)

"Tribe to a Nation"

- Helmut Karbacher – spoken word
- Einstein – quoted citation
- Marinho Nobre – Music By – Spoken Word Musical Bed

"Valtio"

- Apocalyptica – strings
  - Eicca Toppinen – cello; co-composition
  - Max Lilja – cello
  - Paavo Lötjönen – cello
  - Perttu Kivilaakso – cello
- Juha Heininen – recording, & mixing (at The Hit Factory and Millbrook Studio)

Guest vocals

- Dr. Israel – on "Tribe to a Nation"
- Jello Biafra – on "Politricks"
- Jamey Jasta – on "Human Cause"
- Cristian Machado – on "Annihilation"
- João Gordo – on "Rise Above"

=== Production ===
- Steve Evetts – engineering; also recording & mixing (7, 9, & 15)
- What? (Theo Mares) – engineering assistance (at Rio de Janeiro)
- Ted Jensen – mastering (at Sterling Sound, New York City)
- John Goodmanson – mixing (at The Hit Factory, New York City)
- Steve Thompson – mixing
- Dan Milazzo – mixing assistance
- Albert Levsink – technical assistance
- Jason Spittle – technical assistance
- Mauricio Cersosimo – technical assistance
- Shepard Fairey – cover art
- Léo Dias – band icons
- Tattoo – logo
- Rui Mendes – photography

== Charts ==
Chart (2001)	Peak position
Australian Albums (ARIA)	40
Austrian Albums (Ö3 Austria)	41
French Albums (SNEP)	91
German Albums (Offizielle Top 100)	28
Hungarian Albums (MAHASZ)	34
Italian Albums (Musica e Dischi)	39
Polish Albums (ZPAV)	9
Scottish Albums (OCC)	63
Swiss Albums (Schweizer Hitparade)	84
UK Albums (OCC)	88
UK Rock & Metal Albums (OCC)	8
US Billboard 200	134
US Independent Albums (Billboard)	4
