= Dante XXI =

2006 studio album by Sepultura

Studio album by Sepultura
- Released: March 14, 2006
- Recorded: 2005
- Studio: Estudios Trama (Sao Paulo, Brazil)
- Genres: Groove metal; thrash metal
- Length: 39:06
- Label: SPV - BMG (Brazil)
- Producers: André Moraes; Sepultura; Stanley Soares

Sepultura chronology
Live in São Paulo (2005)	Dante XXI (2006)	The Best of Sepultura (2006)

Dante XXI is the tenth studio album by Brazilian heavy metal band Sepultura, released in 2006 through SPV Records. It is a concept album based on Dante Alighieri's The Divine Comedy. This is the last album with Igor Cavalera on drums.

== Album information ==
Dante XXI was originally titled "Dante 05", but it was changed when it became clear the album would not be released by the end of 2005. The first single from the album was "Convicted in Life". A video for the song was released in 2006, and it won the MTV VMB Best Editing in a Video Award that year. In January 2008, the band released a music video for the song "Ostia". The album artwork was done by Stephan Doitschinoff, whom the band commissioned to do 10 paintings based on the Divine Comedy.

Covers of Judas Priest's "Screaming for Vengeance" and Sick of It All's "Scratch the Surface" were recorded as B-sides. "Screaming for Vengeance" was added as a Japanese bonus track, while "Scratch the Surface" is included on the SOIA tribute album Our Impact Will Be Felt. The Brazilian edition (Krako records), contains two bonus tracks: "Mindwar" (recorded live from Stanley Soares's mixing desk in Erfurt/Germany, on December 3, 2004, while on tour with Motorhead) and "False" (demo recorded at High Five Studio São Paulo, during pre production for Dante XXI in July, 2005).

== Reception ==
Professional ratings
Review scores
Source	Rating
About.com	4.5/5 stars
AllMusic	3.5/5 stars
Alternative Press	4/5 stars
Blabbermouth.net	(7/10)
Brave Words & Bloody Knuckles	(8.5/10)
Metal Storm	(8.5/10)
Stylus Magazine	C−

Many critics stated that it was the best Derrick Green-era Sepultura album thus far. Chad Bowar from About.com praised the album for its intensity and commented that it "brings the thrash at full blast". He also highlighted Green's vocal performance, as well as the album's overall concept. AllMusic's Steve Huey noted that much of the elements that made Sepultura "stand out from the metal pack" are still present on this record, and that this was one of Sepultura's strongest releases with Green on vocals.

Alternative Press reviewer Phil Freeman stated that with this album, Sepultura are "finally back at full strength", giving the listener "exactly what he hopes to get from pioneers in the art of skull-crushing". In a mixed review for Stylus Magazine, Cosmo Lee said that the riffs were "unmemorable" and the songs lacked "tension and release". He also criticized the album's artwork, describing it as a "weak, mild-mannered font worthy of indie rock".

Despite mostly positive reviews, sales of the album were disappointing and continued the decrease in sales of Sepultura's albums since Against, selling only 2,300 copies its first week of release in the US. Dante XXI has sold 120,000+ copies worldwide as of January 2, 2008 and went Gold in Brazil and Cyprus (their first music industry certification outside of Brazil since Roots).

According to Matthew Teutsch, a scholar of literature and popular culture, the album is "a modern-day soundtrack for Dante’s Divine Comedy" and allows an exploration of the poem "through an aesthetic rendering of twenty-first-century national (and international) issues".

== Track listing ==
All music is composed by Andreas Kisser, Derrick Green, Igor Cavalera, except where noted.

No.	Title	Lyrics	Music	Length
1.	"Lost (Intro)"	(Instrumental)		0:59
2.	"Dark Wood of Error"	Kisser		2:18
3.	"Convicted in Life"	Kisser; Green		3:09
4.	"City of Dis"	Green		3:27
5.	"False"	Kisser		3:34
6.	"Fighting On"	Green		4:29
7.	"Limbo (Intro)"	(Instrumental)		0:44
8.	"Ostia"	Kisser		3:07
9.	"Buried Words"	Green		2:35
10.	"Nuclear Seven"	Kisser		3:44
11.	"Repeating the Horror"	Green		3:11
12.	"Eunoé (Intro)"	(Instrumental)		0:13
13.	"Crown and Miter"	Green	Kisser, Green, Cavalera, Paulo Jr.	2:12
14.	"Primium Mobile (Intro)"	(Instrumental)		0:29
15.	"Still Flame"	Kisser	Kisser, André Moraes	4:51
Total length:				39:06

Japanese and Korean bonus track
No.	Title	Lyrics	Music	Length
16.	"Screaming for Vengeance" (Judas Priest cover)	Halford	Downing; Tipton	3:31

Brazilian bonus tracks
No.	Title	Lyrics	Music	Length
16.	"Mind War (live)"	Kisser; Green	Kisser; Green; Cavalera; Paulo Jr.	3:01
17.	"False (demo)"	Kisser	Kisser; Green; Cavalera	3:15

Our Impact Will Be Felt track
No.	Title	Lyrics	Music	Length
11.	"Scratch the Surface" (Sick of It All cover)	Koller	Koller; Setari; Majidi	2:35

== Credits ==
=== Sepultura ===
- Derrick Green - vocals
- Andreas Kisser - guitars
- Paulo Jr. - bass
- Igor Cavalera - drums, percussion

=== Additional personnel ===
==== Horns ====
- Luiz Garcia
- Samuel Hamzem

==== Cellists ====
- Fabio Presgrave
- Bia Rebello

==== Crew ====
- Guilherme Cersosimo
- Estevam Romera
- Rogerinho Motorhead
- Pedro Verdone

==== Others ====
- André Moraes - percussion, piano, programming, sitar, Fender Rhodes, horns arrangements, strings arrangements, introduction, minimoog, production
- Andreas Kisser - horns arrangements, strings arrangements
- Stephan Doitschinoff - paintings
- Mauricio Cersosimo - pre-production
- Susanne Kammer - design
- Stanley Soares - producer, engineer, mixing

==== Assistants ====
- Fragata
- Helio Leite

== Charts ==
Chart (2006)	Peak position
Belgian Albums (Ultratop Flanders)	180
French Albums (SNEP)	166
German Albums (Offizielle Top 100)	64
UK Rock & Metal Albums (Official Charts)	8
US Independent Albums (Billboard)	45

== Certifications ==
Region	Certification	Certified units/sales
Cyprus	Gold	5,000
