= Sagrado Inferno =

Brazilian heavy metal band

- Origin: Belo Horizonte, Brazil
- Genres: Heavy metal, thrash metal, black metal
- Years active: 1983-1987; 2012-present
- Label: Independent
- Members: Markin Junior; Lukas Vilela; Marcos Rodrigues
- Past members: Pedro Vitor; Dilsinho; Silvinho; Ronaldo; Robinho; Victor Peixoto; Fernando Righi; Rogerio; Heitor Alípio; Roberto "UFO"
- Website: SoundCloud.com/SagradoInferno

Sagrado Inferno is a Brazilian heavy metal band formed in 1983 in Belo Horizonte, Minas Gerais. It was a pioneering band in the style of heavy metal, thrash and black metal in the mining capital, influencing bands like Chakal, Witchhammer and Sepultura. The group had broken up in 1987, returning in 2012.

== History ==
=== Early career and demo release (1983-1984) ===
The band was formed in 1983 in the city of Belo Horizonte, being the first heavy metal band from Minas Gerais, influenced by bands of the 70s, like Black Sabbath. Subsequently, albums of bands like Metallica, Slayer, Celtic Frost, Destruction, Kreator, Mercyful Fate began to arrive in Brazil, influencing the band. In an interview with The MetalVox, Marcos Rodrigues had said that he was not influenced by Brazilian metal, although he was listening to Stress's first album quite a lot, but he did not think it influenced the sound of the band.

In 1984 they recorded the first demo titled with the same name of the band "Sagrado Inferno" containing three tracks, "Sagrado Inferno", "Vida Macabra" and "Perseguição", and this second one is still performed today by bands like Chakal and Witchhammer. The songs were recorded under precarious conditions, they constituted a pillar of influence for many bands that would appear shortly after, heading the legendary Metal scene of Belo Horizonte. One of the unique and remarkable public appearances, was conceived in Metal BH II festival in 1985, where the band played alongside Sarcófago, Sepultura, Armmagedom, Chakal and Minotauro, making a great show. Also in 1985, the band suffered the loss of their original drummer, Betao-Ronca Ferro, who allegedly died from an extreme alcohol poisoning during a party with friends.

=== The loss of the great opportunity (1986) ===
In 1986, because of a disagreement between guitarist Silvinho and João Eduardo de Faria Filho, owner of Cogumelo Records, the band Sagrado Inferno lost to the Sepultura (who shared the recording with Overdose) the protagonist of the first metal album produced in Minas Gerais: Século XX / Bestial devastation.

=== Death of Silvinho and the end of the group (1987) ===
In 1987, about to record their first compact, an accident ends the band's career when guitarist Silvinho died as a result of an electric shock. The bass player Marcos Rodrigues in 1992 had moved to the city of Santa Bárbara and presently acted as director of a school, and the other members took their course.

=== The Return of the Sagrado Inferno ===
After 25 years inactive the only original member of the band, Marcos Rodrigues, living in another city affirmed that there were no heavy metal fans in the place, he waited for the growth of the children, soon after they set up a band called Laranja Mecânica (based on one of their songs) and recorded a demo, Marcos talked with his brother (Dilsinho old guitarist of the original formation), he approved the sound and then Marcos returned with the name Sagrado Inferno.

== Members ==
=== The current members ===
- Markin Junior – Vocalist and Guitarist (2012–present)
- Lukas Vilela – Bass (2012–present)
- Marcos Rodrigues – Drums (2004–present) Bass (1983 - 1987)

=== Ex-members ===
- Pedro Vitor - Guitarist (2012)
- Dilsinho - Guitarist (1984)
- Silvinho - Guitarist (1983 - 1987)
- Ronaldo - Drums (1984)
- Robinho - Vocalist (2012)
- Victor Peixoto - Vocalist (2012)
- Fernando Righi - Bass (1983)
- Rogerio - Vocalist (1984)
- Heitor Alípio - Bass (2012)
- Roberto UFO - Guitar (1983) Ex - (Sagrado Inferno, Sepultura, Sarcofago, Kalabouço "Rob Thunder", Apolium)

== Discography ==
=== Demos ===
- (1984) - Demo

=== EPs ===
- (2016) - Sagrado Inferno
