= Jéssica Pauletto =

Brazilian fashion model (born 1990)

- Born: Jéssica Pauletto; 19 April 1990 (age 36); Brazil, Rio Grande do Sul, Bento Gonçalves
- Modeling information
- Height: 1.78 m (5 ft 10 in)
- Hair color: brown
- Eye color: blue
- Agency: WAY Model (Brazil), anc.model management (Germany)

Jéssica Pauletto (born 19 April 1990) is a Brazilian fashion model.

== Biography ==
Jéssica Pauletto was born in the town of Bento Gonçalves, State of Rio Grande do Sul, 125 km away from the State's capital Porto Alegre. She is the daughter of a Brazilian industrialist. Her family was originating from the Region of Veneto, Italy.

Like Alessandra Ambrósio, Gisele Bündchen, Caroline Trentini and many other Brazilian models from Rio Grande do Sul, Jéssica Pauletto made her début with the modeling school of Dilson Stein. She joined the agency Marilyn in São Paulo at the end of 2004, and within a year she was already a very much sought-after model.

In January 2005 she participated in the São Paulo Fashion Week (SPFW), and she won the first edition of the Dream Tim contest as best "new face". During the SPFW she walked for 29 different fashion designers. Still during the 2005 winter season, Jéssica participated in the Rio Fashion Week" and was elected best model. Shortly after that she went to New York City and settled there. In 2006 she went to Japan for some months and worked with L'Oréal Japan, Elle, Elle Girl and with the catalogue of the Japanese department stores Isetan (Japanese: 伊勢丹). In 2006 the review Folha included her among the 25 most famous Brazilian models.

Jéssica has appeared in many editorials of magazines, including:

- Vogue (Brazil) (twice)
- Vogue Teen
- Elle (Argentina)
- Elle Girl
- Glamour (Italy)
- Marie Claire (twice)
- Simples Magazine
- SPFW Review

She has been the face of a variety of advertising campaigns of Brazilian fashion houses, including:

- Arezzo
- Triton
- Vide Bula
- Lucy in the Sky
- Saad

She has modeled for the catalogue of the Brazilian fashion house Maria Bonita, and has posed for the following Brazilian photographers:

- André Schiliró
- Cristiano Pio de Almeida
- Jacques Dequeker
- Marcelo Nunes
- Miro

In 2007 Jéssica took a year off due to health problems. But she reappeared more beautiful than ever at the 2008 Winter SPFW, where she made the catwalk for a dozen of fashion companies including Iodice, Triton, Giselle Nasser and Amapô. Subsequently, she went again to Japan. In 2010 she was signed by the ANC Agency in Hamburg, Germany.

== See also ==
- São Paulo Fashion Week
