= Sepultura =

Brazilian heavy metal band

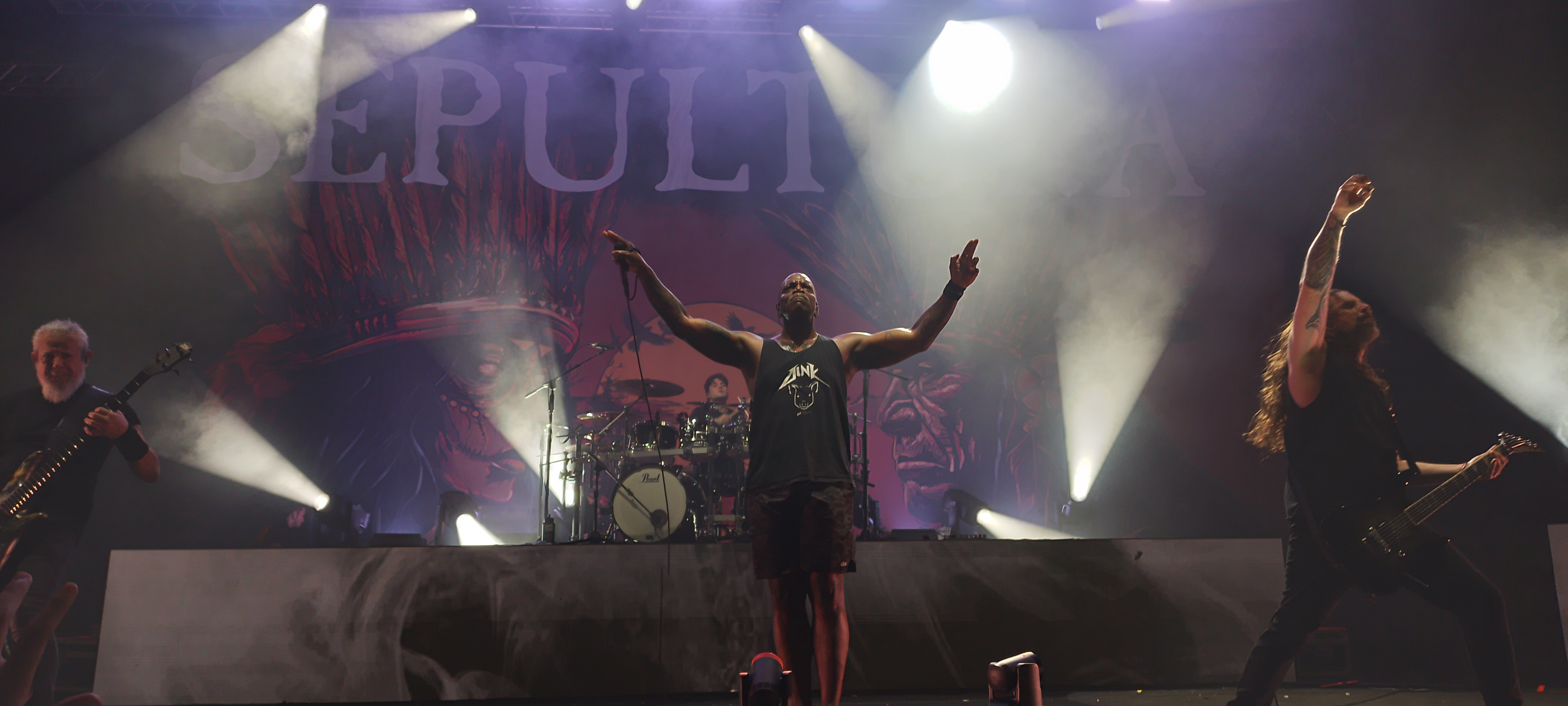
- Sepultura performing live in 2024 (L–R): Paulo Jr., Greyson Nekrutman, Derrick Green and Andreas Kisser

Background information
- Origin: Belo Horizonte, Minas Gerais, Brazil
- Genres: Groove metal; thrash metal; death metal; alternative metal
- Works: Discography
- Years active: 1984–2026
- Labels: Cogumelo; New Renaissance; Roadrunner; Epic; SPV; Nuclear Blast
- Spinoffs: Sarcófago; Nailbomb; Soulfly; Cavalera Conspiracy; De La Tierra
- Past members: See List of former Sepultura members
- Website: sepultura.com.br

Sepultura (Portuguese: [sepuwˈtuɾɐ], "grave") was a Brazilian heavy metal band from Belo Horizonte, formed in 1984 by brothers Max and Igor Cavalera. They were a major force in the groove metal, thrash metal and death metal genres between the late 1980s and mid-1990s, and were also an integral part of the sound of deathrash. Their style had changed over the years, with the band merging its sound with influences and textures of alternative metal, world music, nu metal, progressive rock, hardcore punk, and industrial metal. Sepultura is also considered part of the second wave of thrash metal from the late 1980s to early-to-mid-1990s.

Sepultura released fifteen studio albums. Their second album, Schizophrenia (1987), caught the attention of Roadrunner Records, who signed the band in 1988. Further albums – including Beneath the Remains (1989), Arise (1991), Chaos A.D. (1993), and Roots (1996) – established Sepultura as one of the most popular bands in heavy metal music history. The band has sold over three million units in the United States and almost 20 million worldwide, gaining multiple gold and platinum records around the globe, including France, Australia, Indonesia, the United States, the United Kingdom, Cyprus, and their native Brazil.

Sepultura underwent several membership changes throughout its 42-year run. Max and Igor Cavalera departed in 1996 and 2006, respectively. Their "classic" lineup, which lasted nearly a decade, consisted of Max, Igor, bassist Paulo Jr., and guitarist Andreas Kisser. In the years following Igor's departure in 2006, there were no original members left in the band. Although Paulo Jr. had joined Sepultura shortly after its formation in late 1984 and was the longest serving member, he did not perform on any of their studio albums until Chaos A.D. (Note: Despite being credited as bassist on the band's first four albums, the members of Sepultura have stated in interviews that Paulo Jr. did not perform on any of their albums prior to Chaos A.D.) Kisser, who replaced previous guitarist Jairo Guedz, appeared on every Sepultura album from Schizophrenia to Quadra (2020). He also performed as a bassist until Chaos A.D. Their final lineup consisted of Paulo Jr., Kisser, frontman Derrick Green (who replaced Max in 1997), and drummer Greyson Nekrutman. In March 2024, after more than four decades of activity, the band began a two-year-long farewell tour, after which they disbanded; an EP, The Cloud of Unknowing (2026), was released to coincide with the tour's final year.

== History ==
=== Formation, Bestial Devastation and Morbid Visions (1984–1986) ===
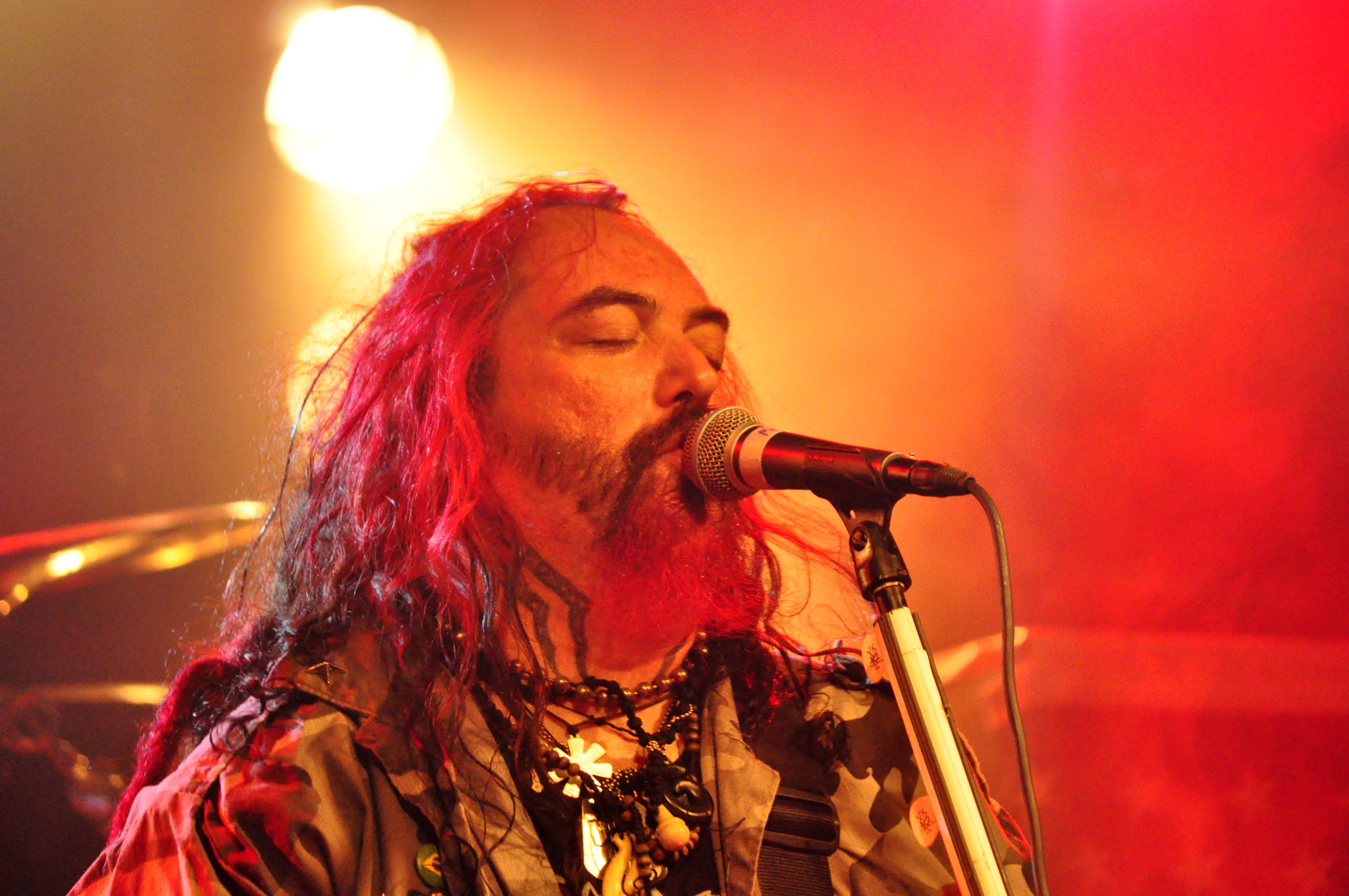
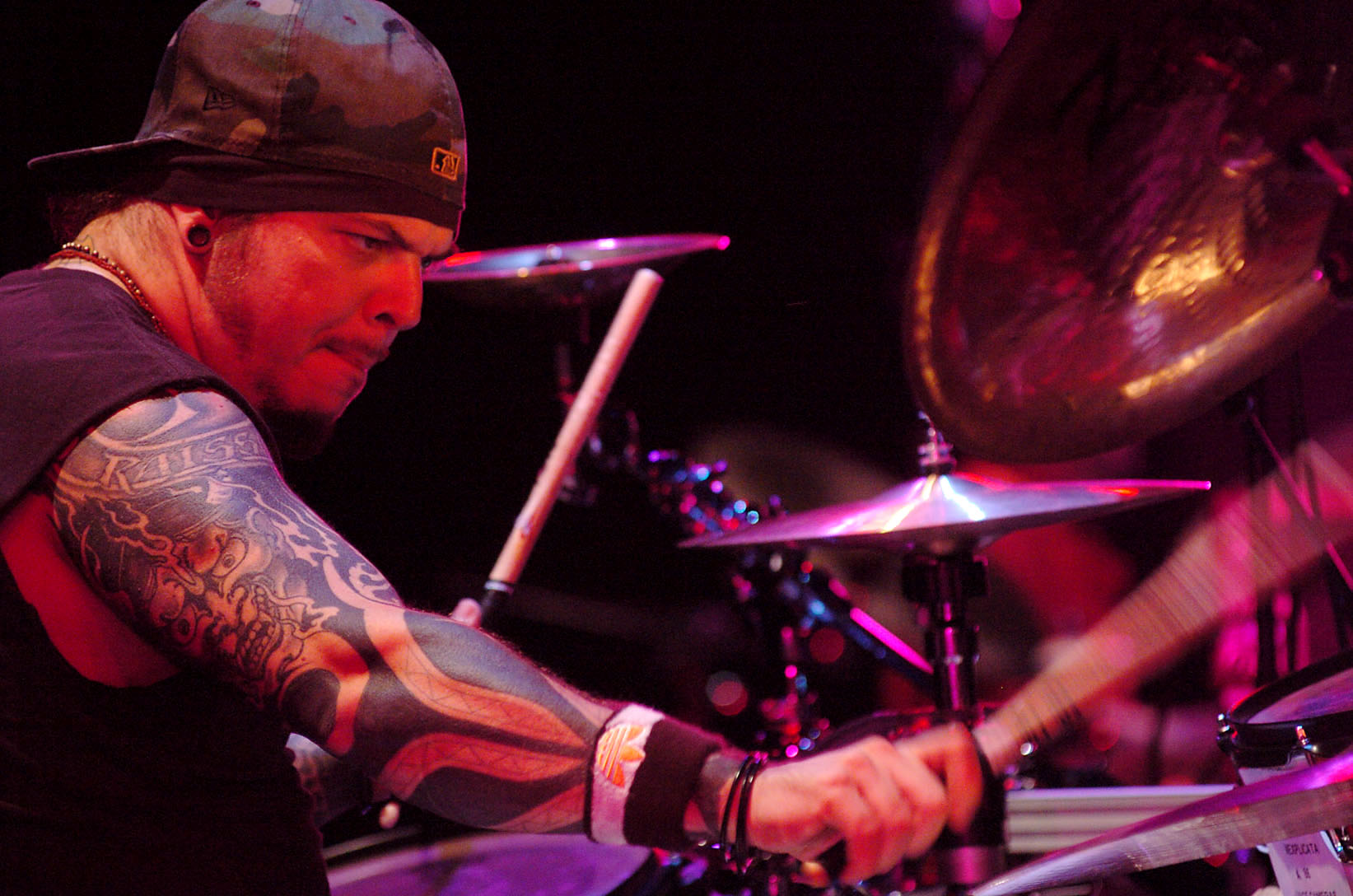
The Cavalera brothers, vocalist and guitarist Max (left) and drummer Igor (right), were founding members of Sepultura. Max stayed with the band until 1996, while Igor remained until 2006.

Sepultura was formed in 1984 in Belo Horizonte by brothers Max and Igor Cavalera, the sons of model Vânia, and well-to-do Italian diplomat Graciliano, whose death left the family in financial ruin. Graciliano's passing deeply affected his sons, inspiring them to form a band after Max heard Black Sabbath's 1972 album Vol. 4 the very same day. They chose the name Sepultura, the Portuguese word for "grave", when Max translated the lyrics of the Motörhead song "Dancing on Your Grave". The brothers were previously in a cover band.

The brothers' early influences included Led Zeppelin, Black Sabbath, Deep Purple, Van Halen, Iron Maiden, Motörhead, AC/DC, Judas Priest, Ozzy Osbourne, V8, Terveet Kädet, Rattus, and Discharge. They would travel to a record store in São Paulo that mixed tapes of then-latest records by American bands. Their listening habits changed after they were introduced to Venom. As Igor Cavalera recalls:

I remember the first time I listened to Venom, it was on a friend's borrowed tape. It was similar to Motörhead, only a lot heavier. I remember someone saying: "It's the devil's Motörhead!" After we got acquainted with Venom, we stopped listening to Iron Maiden and all that lighter stuff.

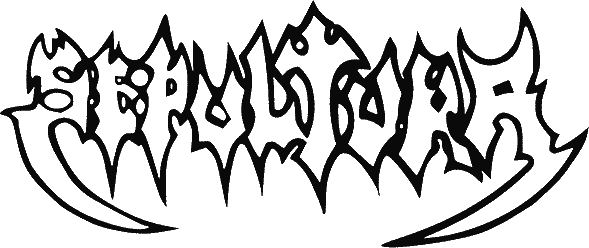
One of Sepultura's early logos, used on the Schizophrenia album cover, and in the booklets of their first four studio albums.

The Cavalera brothers started listening to more extreme metal bands such as Hellhammer, Celtic Frost, Kreator, Sodom, Slayer, Megadeth, Exodus, Exciter, and Dark Angel. They were also influenced by Brazilian metal bands like Stress, Sagrado Inferno, and Dorsal Atlântica. By 1984, they had dropped out of school. After several early membership changes, Sepultura established a stable lineup of Max on guitar, Igor on drums, lead vocalist Wagner Lamounier, and bassist Paulo Jr. Lamounier departed in March 1985 and became the leader of pioneering Brazilian black metal band Sarcófago. Max took over the vocal duties and Jairo Guedz joined the band as lead guitarist.

After a year of performing, Sepultura signed with Cogumelo Records in 1985. Later that year, they released Bestial Devastation, a split EP with Brazilian band Overdose. It was recorded and self-produced in just two days. The band recorded their first full-length album, Morbid Visions, in August 1986. Released that November, the album contained the track "Troops of Doom", which gained some media attention. The band relocated to São Paulo.

=== Schizophrenia, Beneath the Remains and Arise (1987–1992) ===
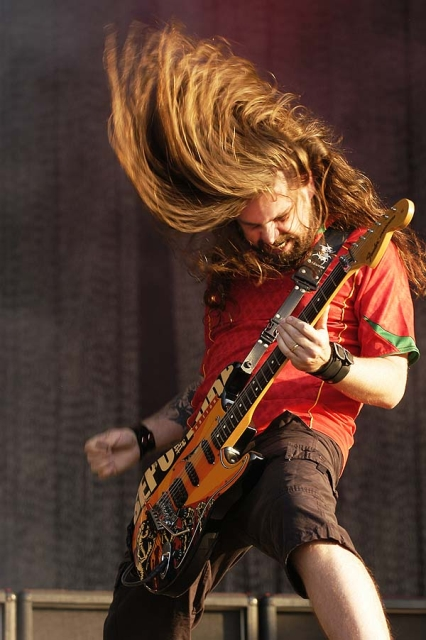
Guitarist Andreas Kisser replaced Jairo Guedz in 1987, and remained a member of Sepultura until their disbandment in 2026. His teunre provided the group with a more technical experience.

In early 1987, Guedz quit the band and was replaced by São Paulo-based guitarist Andreas Kisser. They released their second studio album, and debut with Kisser, Schizophrenia, in October of that year. The album reflected a change towards a thrash metal-oriented sound while retaining the death metal elements of Morbid Visions. Schizophrenia displayed improved production and performance, becoming a minor critical sensation and sought-after import in Europe and North America. The band sent tapes to the United States that made radio playlists during a time when they were struggling to book shows as club owners were wary of their style. Sepultura gained attention from Roadrunner Records, who signed them in the spring of 1988 and released Schizophrenia internationally before seeing the band perform in person. Max Cavalera later recalled to Revolver magazine, "We were finally going to get a real label, real producer, real studio. Things were happening...and it was up to us to write the best material possible. And I think that charged everybody up and we went into the jam room with an attitude of let's not fuck around. This is our shot. You only get so many shots in this life, and you gotta make it count."

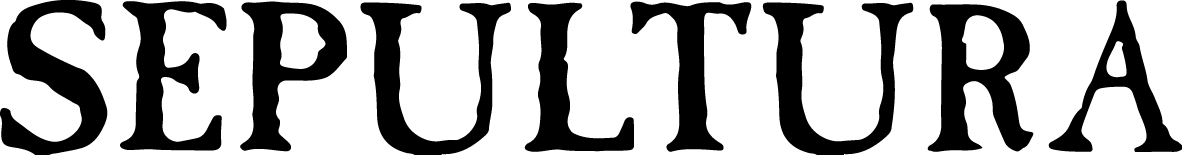
Sepultura's "classic" logo, used on all of the band's studio albums from Beneath the Remains (1989) to Against (1998), and again from Kairos (2011) to Quadra (2020).

In a May 2018 interview, Kisser noted that Sepultura would not have been possible without family support, not only from his own family, but also from the families of Max and Igor, and Paulo Jr.

Sepultura's third studio album, Beneath the Remains, was released in April 1989. The album was recorded towards the end of 1988 in a rustic studio in Rio de Janeiro. The band communicated through translators with American producer Scott Burns. Beneath the Remains was an immediate success and established Sepultura as "an international proposition"; it became known as a classic on the order of Slayer's Reign in Blood. Terrorizer magazine hailed it as one of the all-time top 20 thrash metal albums, as well as gaining a place in their all-time top 40 death metal records. AllMusic gave the album 4.5 stars out of 5 and said, "The complete absence of filler here makes this one of the most essential death/thrash metal albums of all time." European and American tours furthered the band's reputation, although they were still very limited English speakers; their first live dates outside of Brazil included opening for Sodom on their Agent Orange tour in Europe. Sepultura's first U.S. show followed, held on October 31, 1989 at the Ritz in New York City, opening for King Diamond. During this time, the band released its first music video for the song "Inner Self", which received considerable airplay on MTV's Headbangers Ball, giving Sepultura their first exposure in North America. Touring in support of Beneath the Remains continued throughout most of 1990, including three shows in Brazil with Napalm Death, European dates with Mordred, and a North American tour with Obituary and Sadus.

Traveling on trains. Getting beat up by cops. Sleeping behind the stage. It's part of growing up. It's part of the nature of this stuff. If you don't have that kind of background, you can't be a band like us.

— Max Cavalera reflecting on Sepultura's past in Brazil

Sepultura relocated to Phoenix, Arizona in 1990, obtained new management, and recorded their fourth studio album, Arise, at Morrisound Studios in Tampa, Florida. By the time the album was released in March 1991, the band had become one of the most critically praised thrash/death metal bands of the time. The first single, "Dead Embryonic Cells", was a success, and the title track gained additional attention when MTV banned its video due to its apocalyptic religious imagery. It did, however, get some airplay on Headbangers Ball, as did the music videos for "Dead Embryonic Cells" and "Desperate Cry". Arise was critically acclaimed and the band's first to enter the US chart, reaching No. 119 on the Billboard 200.

Sepultura toured relentlessly in support of Arise throughout 1991 and 1992. Prior to the album's release, the band played for more than 100,000 people at the Rock in Rio II festival. The tour began in May 1991 with a European trek with Sacred Reich and Heathen, followed by the New Titans on the Bloc tour in North America that included support from Sacred Reich, Napalm Death and Sick of It All. They also played with several other bands, including Slayer, Testament, Motörhead, Kreator, White Zombie, Type O Negative, and Fudge Tunnel, and along with Alice in Chains, Sepultura supported Ozzy Osbourne on the latter's tour for No More Tears. Max Cavalera married the band's manager Gloria Bujnowski during this period. The Arise tour concluded in December 1992 with a North American tour, where the band (along with Helmet) supported Ministry on their Psalm 69 tour.

=== Chaos A.D., Nailbomb and Roots (1993–1996) ===
Sepultura's fifth album, Chaos A.D., was released in October 1993. Supported by the singles "Refuse/Resist", "Territory", and "Slave New World", it was their only album to be released in North America by Epic Records, and the first of two albums to be certified gold by the RIAA. It marked a departure from the death metal sound of the band's previous works, adding elements of groove metal, industrial, hardcore punk, and thrash metal. AllMusic gave the album 4.5 stars out of 5 and wrote that, "Chaos A.D. ranks as one of the greatest heavy metal albums of all time", while Ultimate Guitar claimed it to be the album that "elevated Sepultura to even greater heights" and called it "an integral part of the decade's so-called 'groove metal' boom movement." The band embarked on a year-and-a-half-long tour in support of Chaos A.D., headlining a European run with Paradise Lost, followed by a North American tour with Fudge Tunnel, Fear Factory, and Clutch. They were one of the supporting acts (along with Biohazard and Prong) for Pantera's Far Beyond Driven tour in North America, opened for the Ramones in South America, and toured Australia and New Zealand with Sacred Reich. By the time the Chaos A.D. tour ended in November 1994, Sepultura was one of the most successful heavy metal bands of the day.

Also in 1993, Max and Igor formed Nailbomb with Alex Newport of Fudge Tunnel. They released an industrial-oriented album, Point Blank, the following year. The group performed its only live concert for nearly two decades at Dynamo Open Air in 1995, which was released as a live album, Proud to Commit Commercial Suicide. Nailbomb disbanded shortly afterward.

Sepultura's sound continued changing with their sixth album, Roots, released in February 1996. The band experimented with Brazil's indigenous music, and adopted a slower, down-tuned sound. The album was hailed as a modern-day heavy metal classic and a major influence on the then-nascent nu metal scene. AllMusic gave it a rating of 4.5 stars out of 5 and said, "Roots consolidates Sepultura's position as perhaps the most distinctive, original heavy metal band of the 1990s." It was the band's second and last album to be certified gold in the United States. Also in 1996, Sepultura performed "War (Guerra)" for the AIDS benefit album Silencio=Muerte: Red Hot + Latin, produced by the Red Hot Organization.

=== Departure of Max Cavalera, arrival of Derrick Green and Against (1996–2000) ===
In August 1996, Sepultura played on the Castle Donington Monsters of Rock main stage with Kiss, Ozzy Osbourne, Paradise Lost, Type O Negative, Biohazard, and Fear Factory. The band performed as a three-piece, with Andreas Kisser filling in on lead vocals, as Max Cavalera left the concert site earlier in the day upon learning of his stepson Dana Wells' death in a car accident. After Wells' funeral, Max returned and continued to tour with Sepultura. A few months after Wells' death, the band met with Max and said they wanted to fire their manager Gloria Bujnowski, Max's wife and Dana's mother, and find new management, much to the chagrin of Max himself. Their reasoning was that Bujnowski was giving Max preferential treatment while neglecting the rest of the band. Max's final performance with Sepultura was at the Brixton Academy in England on December 16, 1996. Max, still coming to terms with Wells' death and angered by their decision to fire his wife, quit the band shortly after the concert. His split with Sepultura was publicly announced in January 1997, citing his differences with the remaining members of the band and their refusal to renew a management contract with Bujnowski as factors.

I started Sepultura back in the day. I used to write that name on my schoolbooks. What I'm going through now, is like watching my own son die. I cry every day, I feel hurt, sad, angry, it's like half of me has died.

— Max Cavalera explaining his feelings on leaving Sepultura

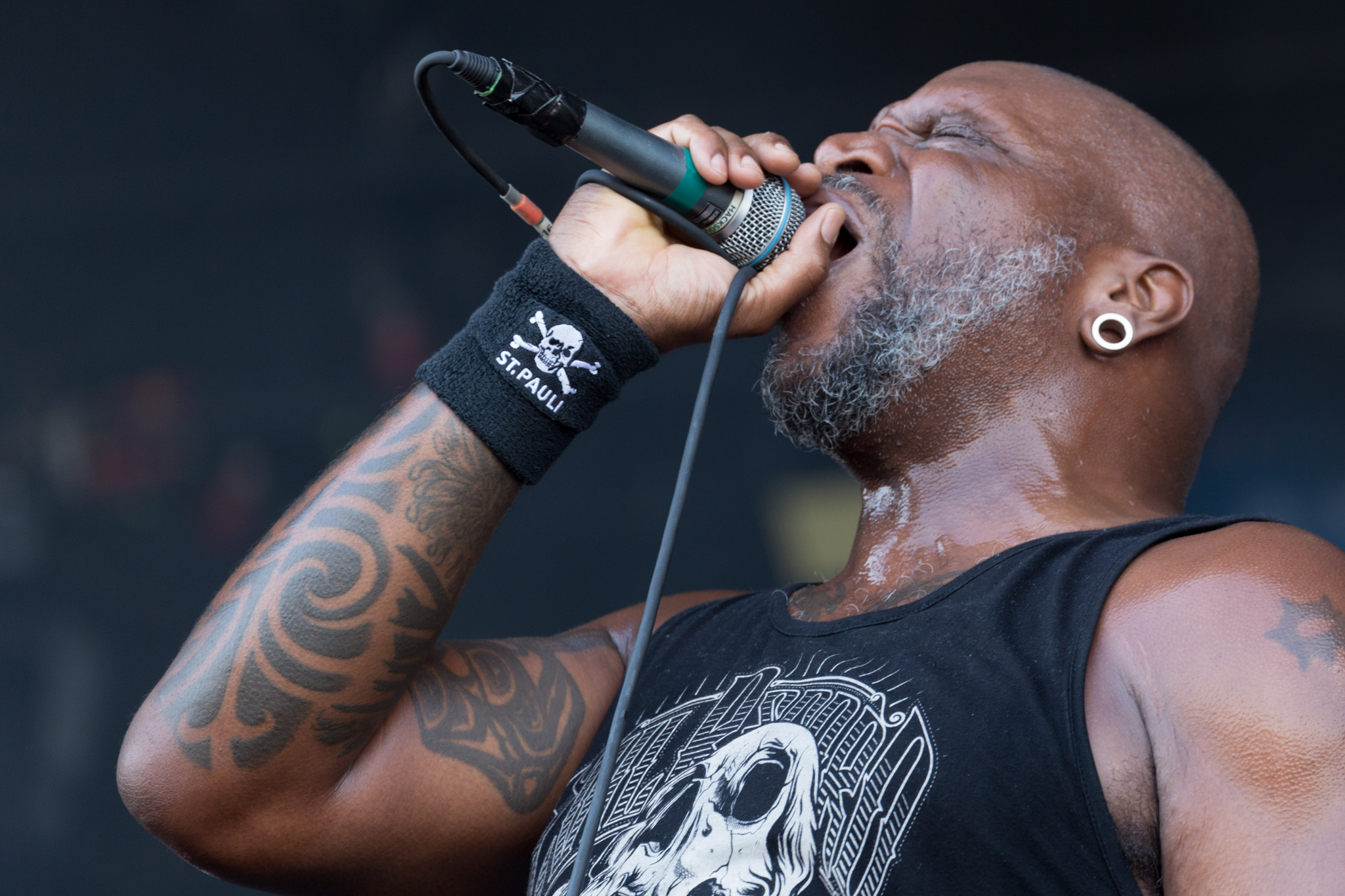
Derrick Green (who replaced Max Cavalera) was the lead singer of Sepultura from 1997 to their disbandment in 2026.

Following Cavalera's departure, the remaining members remained a three-piece for eight months and worked on new material, with Kisser on vocals. In November 1997, the band announced that they were searching for a new vocalist. Among those who auditioned were Chuck Billy of Testament, Phil Demmel of Machine Head and Vio-lence, Marc Grewe of Morgoth, Jorge Rosado of Merauder, and a then-unknown singer Jason "Gong" Jones. American musician Derrick Green was selected as the new frontman. Sepultura played their first show with Green to a handful of fan club members at their rehearsal space in Brazil in February 1998. The band played their first public show under the pseudonym "Troops of Doom" on July 8, 1998 at the House of Blues in Los Angeles, where they were supported by Human Waste Project, Tura Satana, and Spineshank. The first album with the new lineup was Against, released in October 1998. The album was critically and commercially less successful than previous albums and sold considerably fewer copies than the self-titled debut album by Max Cavalera's then-new band Soulfly. In a retrospective review, AllMusic gave the album 3 stars out of 5, stating that "there are enough flashes of the old Sepultura brilliance to suggest that great things are still to come."

=== Nation and Roorback (2001–2005) ===
Sepultura's eighth album, Nation (2001), sold poorly. It would be their last with Roadrunner Records. AllMusic gave the album 3 stars out of 5 and said, "As Green scrapes the lining of his vocal chords through the brash, impassioned tracks, he's singing about more than just 'one nation, Sepulnation'; he's suggesting something bigger, something worth shouting about and fighting for." In an interview, Derrick Green said, "Every song will be related to the idea of building this nation. We will have our own flags, our own anthem." Max Cavalera's final live show with Sepultura, Under a Pale Grey Sky, was released in 2002 as a live album by Roadrunner Records.

After recording an EP of covers, Revolusongs (2002), the band released their ninth studio album, Roorback, in 2003. Despite receiving greater critical acclaim than its predecessors, sales remained low. It was their first album with SPV Records. AllMusic gave the album 4 stars out of 5 and said, "If there are still any lingering doubts about the Green/Sepultura match, 2003's excellent Roorback should put them to rest for good. Green is passionate and focused throughout the album — he has no problem going that extra mile — and the writing is consistently strong." In 2005, the band played in the annual Dubai Desert Rock Festival. In November of that year, a live double DVD/double CD, Live in São Paulo, was released. This was the first official live album by the band.

=== Dante XXI, departure of Igor Cavalera, and A-Lex (2006–2010) ===
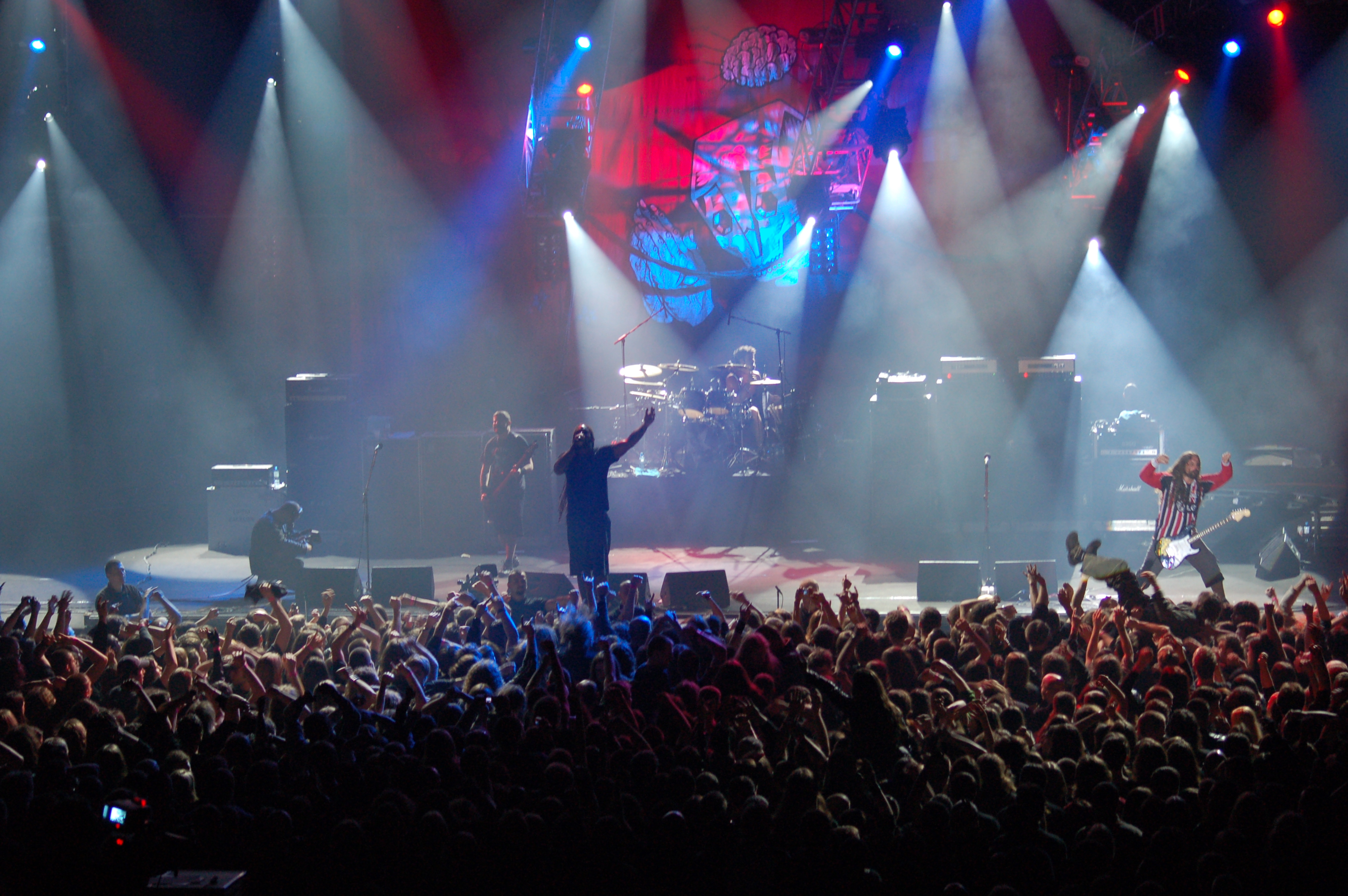
Sepultura performing at Metalmania in Poland, 2007

Sepultura's tenth studio album, Dante XXI, was released on March 14, 2006. It is a concept album based on Dante Alighieri's The Divine Comedy. Music videos were released for the songs "Convicted in Life" and "Ostia". AllMusic gave the album 3.5 stars out of 5 and said that, "Overall, Dante XXI is easily one of Sepultura's strongest releases to feature Green on vocals."

In a 2007 interview with Revolver magazine, Max Cavalera stated that he and Igor, both of whom had recently reconciled after a near decade-long feud, would reunite with the original Sepultura lineup. There were rumors that the reunited lineup would play on the main stage at Ozzfest 2007. However, Kisser clarified that there would be no reunion. Instead, Igor Cavalera left Sepultura after the release of Dante XXI and was replaced by Brazilian drummer Jean Dolabella, leaving the band without any original members. After leaving Sepultura, Igor and Max formed Cavalera Conspiracy.

The band was a featured musical guest at the Latin Grammy Awards of 2008 on November 13. They performed a cover of "The Girl from Ipanema", and "We've Lost You" from the album A-Lex. The 9th annual Latin Grammy Awards ceremony was held at the Toyota Center in Houston, Texas and aired on Univision.

Sepultura released A-Lex on January 26, 2009. This was the first Sepultura album to include neither Cavalera brother, with bassist Paulo Jr. as the sole remaining member from the band's debut album. A-Lex is a concept album based on the book A Clockwork Orange. The album was recorded at Trama Studios in São Paulo, Brazil, and produced by Stanley Soares. AllMusic gave the album 4 stars out of 5 and said, "Personnel changes can have a very negative effect on a band, but Sepultura have maintained their vitality all these years – and that vitality is alive and well on the superb A-Lex." In the same year, Andreas Kisser contributed his recipe for "Churrasco in Soy Sauce" to Hellbent for Cooking: The Heavy Metal Cookbook, stating that he prefers his meat "medium-rare". Sepultura supported Metallica on January 30 and 31, 2010, at the Morumbi Stadium in São Paulo. The two concerts were attended by 100,000 people. The band filmed a concert DVD in 2010. Sepultura played at Kucukciftlik Park in Istanbul on April 27, 2010. On August 8, 2010, they played at the Hevy Music Festival near Folkestone.

=== Kairos and The Mediator Between Head and Hands Must Be the Heart (2010–2015) ===
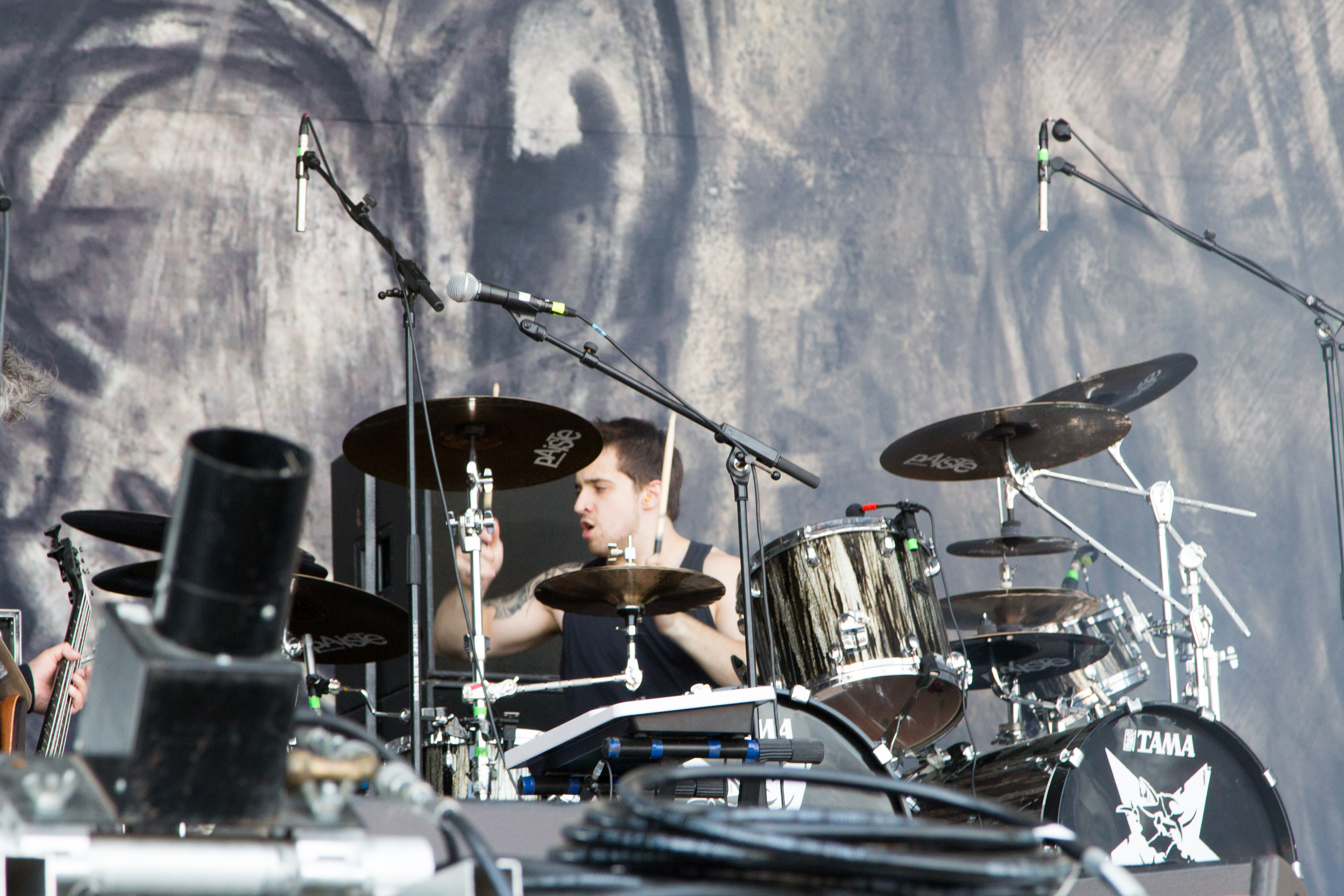
Drummer Eloy Casagrande in 2014. Casagrande was the drummer of Sepultura from 2011 to 2024.

On July 6, 2010, it was announced that Sepultura signed with Nuclear Blast Records, and would release their first album for the label in 2011. The band confirmed there would be no reunion of the classic lineup. By the end of 2010, the band began writing new material and entered the studio to record their 12th album with producer Roy Z. On March 1, 2011, Sepultura completed recording the album, titled Kairos and released in June 2011.

The album includes cover versions of Ministry's "Just One Fix" and the Prodigy's "Firestarter", available as bonus tracks on various special-edition releases. Sepultura played on the Kairos World Tour and at Wacken Open Air 2011. Drummer Jean Dolabella left the band and was replaced by Eloy Casagrande in November 2011, who had previously played in Gloria and Andre Matos' solo band. In November and December 2011, Sepultura participated in the Thrashfest Classics tour alongside thrash metal bands like Exodus, Destruction, Heathen, and Mortal Sin.

In May 2012, guitarist Andreas Kisser told Metal Underground that Sepultura would soon "start working on something new with Eloy" and see if they could "get ready for new music early next year." In an interview at England's Bloodstock Open Air on August 10, 2012, Kisser revealed that Sepultura would be filming a live DVD with the French percussive group Les Tambours du Bronx. He also revealed that the band was "already thinking about new ideas" for their next album and would "have something new going on" in 2013.

On December 10, 2012, producer Ross Robinson, who produced Sepultura's Roots album, tweeted: "Oh, didn't mention.. Spoke to Andreas, it's on. My vision, smoke Roots", suggesting he would be producing the band's next album. This was later confirmed, as well as an announcement that it would be co-produced by Steve Evetts. Original Slayer drummer Dave Lombardo made a guest appearance on the album.

On January 25, 2013, it was announced that author Jason Korolenko was working on Relentless – 30 Years of Sepultura, which is described in a press release as "the only book-length biography to cover the band's entire 30-year career." Relentless was published on October 8, 2014, in Poland under the title Brazylijska Furia, and the English language edition was published via Rocket 88 on December 4, 2014. The Brazilian edition, titled Relentless – 30 Anos de Sepultura, was scheduled for publication via Benvira in early 2015. The French language edition of Relentless was published in France on October 19, 2015.

On July 19, 2013, it was revealed that the title of the band's thirteenth album was The Mediator Between Head and Hands Must Be the Heart. In September 2013, they performed at Rock in Rio with Brazilian rock/MPB artist Zé Ramalho – this lineup was named "Zépultura", a portmanteau of both artists' names.

=== Machine Messiah and Quadra (2016–2023) ===
After more than two years of touring in support of The Mediator Between Head and Hands Must Be the Heart, Sepultura entered the studio in mid-2016 to begin recording their fourteenth studio album, with Jens Bogren as the producer. The resulting album, Machine Messiah, was released on January 13, 2017. Sepultura promoted the album with a series of world tours, including supporting Kreator on their Gods of Violence tour in Europe in February–March 2017, and along with Prong, they supported Testament on the latter's Brotherhood of the Snake tour in North America in April–May 2017. The band toured Europe in February–March 2018 with Obscura, Goatwhore and Fit for an Autopsy, and Australia in May with Death Angel.

The first official Sepultura documentary, Sepultura Endurance, premiered in May 2017 and was released on June 17. Max and Igor declined to be interviewed for the documentary film and refused to allow early material of the band to be used.

In an August 2018 interview at Wacken Open Air, Kisser confirmed that Sepultura had begun the songwriting process of their fifteenth studio album, and stated later that month that it would not be released before 2020. The band began recording the album, again with producer Bogren, in August 2019 for a tentative February 2020 release.

In October 2019, during their performance at Rock in Rio 8, the band announced the name and revealed the cover for their fifteenth studio album, Quadra. They debuted lead single "Isolation", also the opening track for the album. On November 8, they released the studio version of "Isolation" and announced that Quadra would be released on February 7, 2020. Due to the COVID-19 pandemic, Sepultura was not able to tour or play any shows in support of Quadra for over two years after its release. They played their first show in two years at Circo Voador in Rio de Janeiro on February 12, 2022. The band promoted Quadra by touring North America with Sacred Reich, Crowbar and Art of Shock, and Europe with Sacred Reich and Crowbar; due to COVID-19, the tours had been rescheduled to two years from March and April 2020 and a year from the fall of 2021 respectively. Drummer Bruno Valverde of Angra filled in for Eloy Casagrande on the last three dates of the US tour, as the latter could not perform due to a leg injury. Due to a "family emergency", Kisser was temporarily replaced by Jean Patton of Project46 on the summer 2022 European tour; the reason behind this "family emergency" was Kisser's wife Patricia's battle with colon cancer. She died on July 3. The band co-headlined the Klash of the Titans tour in North America with Kreator during the spring of 2023, with Death Angel and SpiritWorld as supporting acts.

Sepultura released a quarantine collaboration album on August 13, 2021, titled SepulQuarta, including contributions by members of Megadeth, Testament, Anthrax, System of a Down, Trivium, and Sacred Reich.

In a July 2022 interview, frontman Derrick Green confirmed that Sepultura would begin working on their next studio album after the end of the Quadra tour, in 2024 at the earliest. Kisser indicated that the band was not expected to release another studio album before at least 2025 or for "a few years".

=== 40th anniversary, farewell tour, The Cloud of Unknowing and disbandment (2023–2026) ===
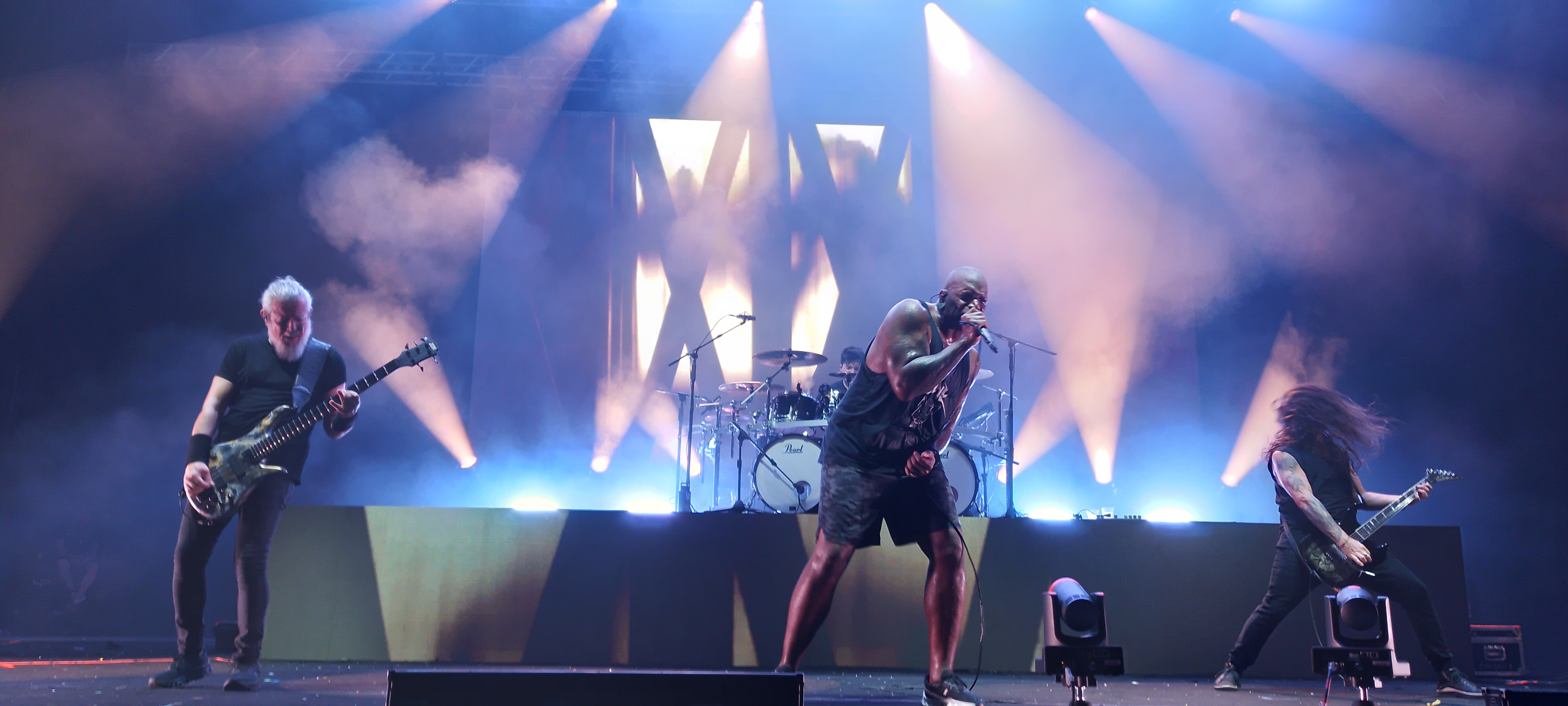
Sepultura performing in 2024

In August 2023, Kisser revealed that Sepultura would celebrate its 40th anniversary in 2024 with a "special tour" that would not include Max and Igor Cavalera, as well as a live album.

On December 8, 2023, Sepultura announced that they would embark on a farewell tour in 2024 in celebration of their 40th anniversary, titled Celebrating Life Through Death. It was set to run for 18 months, though Kisser later stated that the tour would end around late 2026. When asked about the band "departing via a conscious and planned death on this farewell tour", Kisser explained, "There were a few factors, including the fortieth anniversary. Surviving the pandemic gave us new perspective, and then two years ago my wife passed away from cancer. It made me realise that dying can bring new possibilities for life. Live in the present, there might not be a tomorrow." The first show of the tour took place at the Arena Hall in Belo Horizonte on March 1, 2024.

Flyer for Sepultura's final North American concert (shown above), which took place at the Wiltern Theatre in Los Angeles on May 29, 2026

Kisser has said that he would be open to reuniting with former members of the band (including the Cavalera brothers) for one final show. Although initially open to reuniting with Sepultura, Max Cavalera ruled out the possibility in a July 2024 interview with Metal Injection, explaining, "The more the time passes by, the more I feel that I don't need to [reunite with Sepultura]. Like I said, the real reunion is between myself and Igor, and I did that. It's pure magic and amazing what we're doing right now. You kind of have to realise if we end up doing a Sepultura reunion, it's almost like we can't go back to the Cavalera thing, you know? It won't really make sense."

Three days before the farewell tour began, it was announced that Casagrande had quit the band on February 6, 2024, to join "another project", later revealed to be Slipknot. He later stated that one of the reasons he left Sepultura was because he "didn't want to stop playing drums at the age of 33." Casagrande was replaced by former Suicidal Tendencies drummer Greyson Nekrutman.

In November 2024, Kisser revealed that Sepultura would release an EP with four new songs. Paulo Jr. confirmed in August 2025 the band had "done some new recording with Greyson", and Kisser announced the same month that the EP would be released in 2026. In January 2026, the title of the EP was revealed to be The Cloud of Unknowing; it was released on April 24.

In April 2026, Kisser stated that the "possibilities are always open" for future Sepultura shows after the conclusion of the Celebrating Life Through Death tour. In regards to the band members' future plans, he said, "It's irrelevant to say if [the retirement is] gonna be forever or we gonna be back. The important thing is that we're gonna stop now. We need that rest, because we organize everything around that. We need our time — we need time to look in a different direction." Four months later, Green revealed that the idea of a farewell tour came from Kisser and claimed "the timing of everything, of what was going on" influenced this decision: "We had gotten to a point where we had done the cycle of go in the studio, write some songs, record them, do press dates and everything, then do a tour for two years, and then, again, write new material. We've done that cycle over [and over]... And so then it gets to a point where it's... For us, doing music and playing music is about having fun and having fun with it, and we were fortunate to be able to do that for so many years. It had just gotten to the point where we didn't want it to be something we had to do. We wanted to be something we wanna do, and we wanna take a break, we wanna stop, and we wanna stop on a very high end, a high note, so to speak, where everyone's getting along."

Sepultura's final show took place on November 7, 2026 at the Suhai Music Hall in São Paulo, with Krisiun, Sacred Reich and Metal Allegiance as the supporting acts, after which the band disbanded. During this show, former Sepultura guitarist Jairo Guedz joined the band on stage to perform the songs "Biotech Is Godzilla", "Slave New World" and "Troops of Doom".

Shortly before the farewell tour's conclusion, Kisser confirmed that a new Sepultura live album will be released in 2027, and include 40 songs recorded in 40 different cities.

== Musical style and influences ==
Sepultura has been influenced by rock, heavy metal and hard rock bands such as Yes, Rush, Queen, Kiss, Black Sabbath, Judas Priest, Rainbow, Motörhead, Iron Maiden, Scorpions, Venom, Celtic Frost, Twisted Sister, Triumph, Dio, Whitesnake and Corrosion of Conformity, thrash metal bands Metallica, Slayer, Megadeth, Exodus, Overkill, Testament, Anthrax, Kreator, Sodom, Destruction, Dark Angel and Sacrifice, and death metal bands Possessed and Death. They were also influenced by punk bands such as the Ramones, the Sex Pistols, Terveet Kädet, Rattus, Black Flag, the Dead Kennedys, Kaaos, Discharge, Stormtroopers of Death, Amebix, Sick of It All, Agnostic Front, the Cro-Mags, Gorilla Biscuits and New Model Army, as well as early U2. Kisser has affirmed that "without Slayer, Sepultura would never be possible."

Sepultura's music comes in a wide range of heavy metal musical styles. The band has been described mainly as thrash metal and death metal, and considered one of the primary inventors of the latter genre. Another genre the band has been categorized under is groove metal. The band later on experimented with other genres, including hardcore punk, industrial, alternative metal, progressive, world music, and nu metal. Their first EP Bestial Devastation and debut album Morbid Visions were influenced by first-wave black metal bands such as Venom and Celtic Frost, and both releases have been referred to as blackened death metal. Sepultura put more emphasis on thrash metal starting with Schizophrenia, while Beneath the Remains and Arise saw the band move away from the black metal sound of their first two albums and lean more towards a technical and progressive-tinged deathrash sound. Chaos A.D. saw them abandon much of the band's thrash and death metal influences in favor of an experimental sound influenced by industrial music, groove metal and hardcore punk.

Elements of Latin music, samba and Brazilian folk and tribal music have been incorporated into Sepultura's metal style, particularly on Roots. The album was partly recorded with the indigenous Xavante tribe in Mato Grosso, and incorporates percussion, rhythms, chanting and lyrical themes inspired by the collaboration. While Roots continued in the same groove metal vein from Chaos A.D., it was Sepultura's first foray into nu metal, influenced by bands such as Korn and Deftones. Starting with Dante XXI, the band abandoned the nu metal sound of their previous four albums in favor of a return to thrash and death metal, while retaining elements of groove metal and progressive influences.

== Legacy and impact ==
Sepultura was referred to as one of the "Big Four" of 1990s heavy metal by Lauryn Schaffner of Loudwire, along with Korn, Pantera, and Tool. In 2025, Zahra Huselid of Screen Rant included the band in the site's list of "10 Best Thrash Metal Bands Who Weren't The Big Four".

Looking back on the band's career in a 2016 article on Max and Igor Cavalera's retrospective Return to Roots tour (in commemoration of the album's 20th anniversary), Nashville Scene contributor Saby Reyes-Kulkarni observed that, "Before Chaos A.D., the overwhelming majority of metal had a 'white' feel to it. Sepultura changed that forever. And with Roots, the band went a step further, asserting once and for all that the genre can accommodate native stylings from any culture, much like jazz had done for decades prior." That same year, the staff of Loudwire named them the 41st best metal band of all time.

MTV called Sepultura the most successful Brazilian heavy metal band in history and "perhaps the most important heavy metal band of the '90s." In 1992, Daniel B. Levine of Guitar World wrote, "Offering proof that thrash is an international language is Sepultura, born of the beauty and corruption of their native Brazil", and described them as "a band uniquely qualified to write about violence, corruption, alienation and the deterioration of society." In 1993, Robert Baird of Phoenix New Times wrote that the band played "machine-gun-tempo mayhem" and that the members "love to attack organized religion and repressive government." In 2004, Dan Epstein of Guitar World referred to Sepultura as "the biggest metal band to ever come out of Brazil". He added, "At a time when classic thrash bands of the eighties seemed to be on the wane, Sepultura rose to prominence on the strength of two brutal albums: 1989's Beneath the Remains and 1991's Arise."

Many bands have cited Sepultura as an influence or inspiration to their music, including Korn, Limp Bizkit, Slipknot, Pantera, Machine Head, Cannibal Corpse, Hatebreed, Alien Weaponry, Krisiun, Gojira, Xibalba, Vein, Toxic Holocaust, Code Orange, Puya, Nails, Kittie, Children of Bodom, Power Trip, Atreyu, Evile, Havok, Pestilence, Incantation, Grave, Ektomorf, and Taproot.

== Band members ==
Sepultura live at Tons of Rock 2026

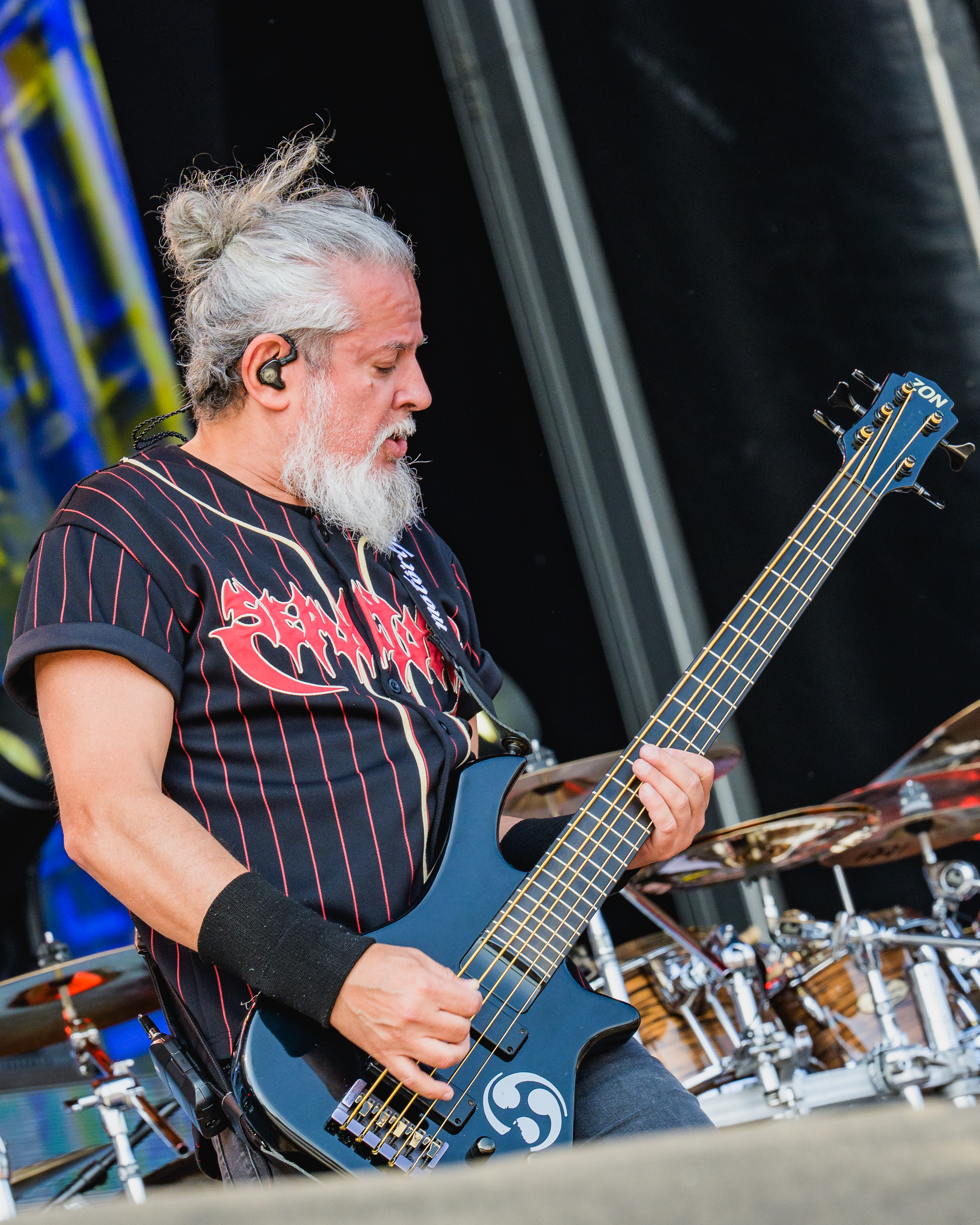
Paulo Jr.

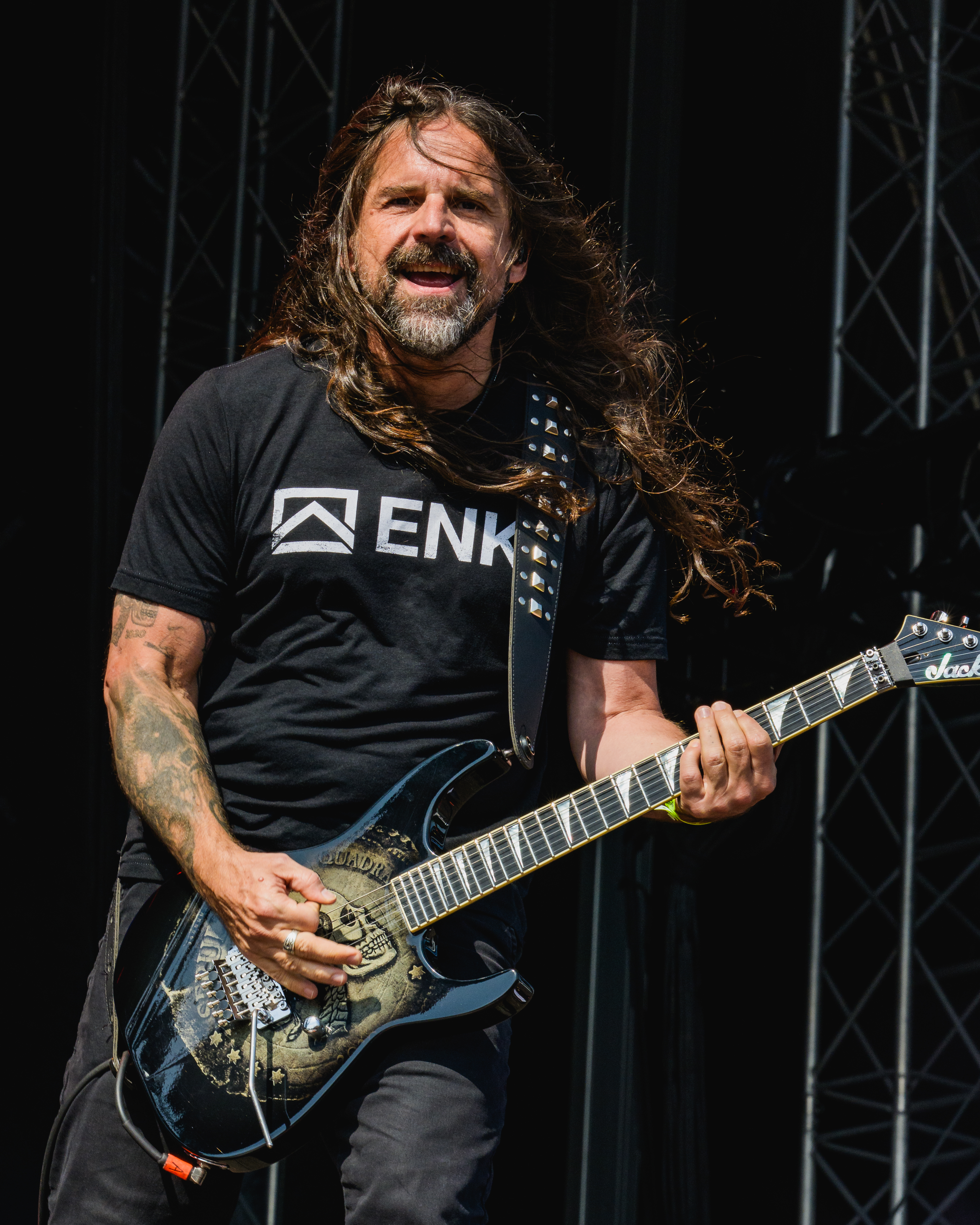
Andreas Kisser

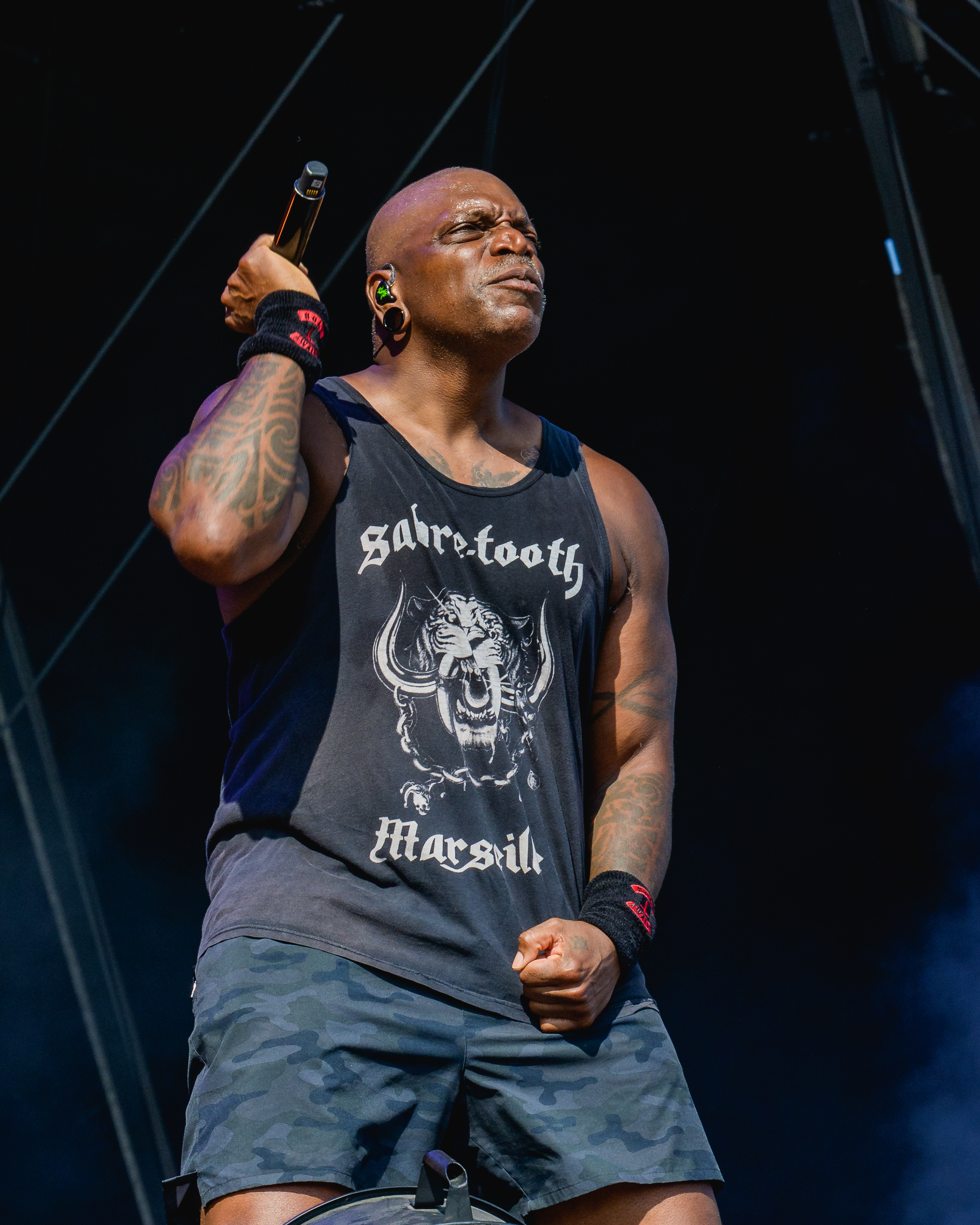
Derrick Green

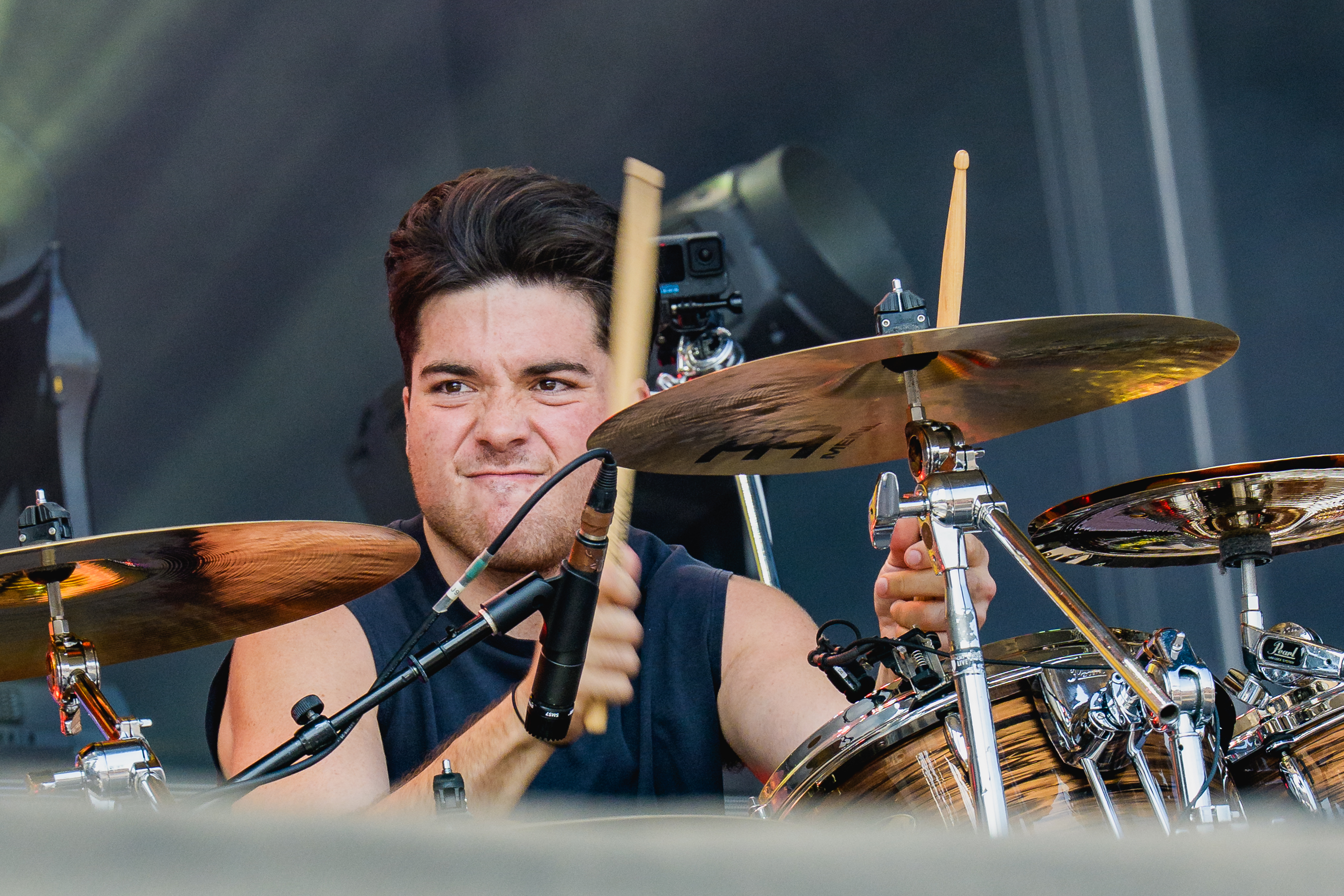
Greyson Nekrutman

Final lineup

- Paulo Jr. – bass (1984–2026, only live until 1992), backing vocals (1984–2026); percussion (1993–1997)
- Andreas Kisser – lead guitar, backing vocals (1987–2026); lead vocals (1996, 1997); bass (1987–1991, only in studio); rhythm guitar (1996–2026)
- Derrick Green – lead vocals (1997–2026); percussion (2005–2026); additional rhythm guitar (1998–2005, 2026)
- Greyson Nekrutman – drums, percussion (2024–2026)

== Discography ==
- Morbid Visions (1986)
- Schizophrenia (1987)
- Beneath the Remains (1989)
- Arise (1991)
- Chaos A.D. (1993)
- Roots (1996)
- Against (1998)
- Nation (2001)
- Roorback (2003)
- Dante XXI (2006)
- A-Lex (2009)
- Kairos (2011)
- The Mediator Between Head and Hands Must Be the Heart (2013)
- Machine Messiah (2017)
- Quadra (2020)

== Bibliography ==
- Anonymous (May 2003). Beneath the Remains. In: A Megaton Hit Parade: The All-Time Thrash Top 20. Terrorizer No. 109, page 35.
- Barcinski, André & Gomes, Silvio (1999). Sepultura: Toda a História. São Paulo: Ed. 34. ISBN 9788573261561. LCCN 99-887894. OCLC 9788573261561. OL 143799M.
- Colmatti, Andréa (1997). Sepultura: Igor Cavalera. Modern Drummer Brasil, 6, 18–26, 28–30.
- Hinchliffe, James (December 2006). Beneath the Remains. In: Death Metal|The DM Top 40. Terrorizer No. 151, page 54.
- Lemos, Anamaria (1993). Caos Desencanado. Bizz, 98, 40–45.
- Schwarz, Paul (2005). Morbid Visions. In: The First Wave. Terrorizer, 128, 42.
- Sepultura (1996). Roots. [CD]. New York, NY: Roadrunner Records. The 25th Anniversary Series (2-CD Reissue, 2005).
- Thoroddsen, Arnar (2006). Dimery, Robert (ed.). 1001 Albums You Must Hear Before You Die. Quintet Publishing Limited. ISBN 9780789313713. LCCN 2005930000. OCLC 63515375. OL 14443780M.
