= Sam Porto =

Brazilian tattoo artist and trans model

- Born: 1995 (age 30–31); Brasília
- Occupations: Tattoo artist and model
- Notable work: Noted as the first trans model to walk in the São Paulo Fashion Week, participated in the Proud My Calvins underwear campaign for Calvin Klein

Sam Porto (born 1995) is a Brazilian tattoo artist and model. He was the first trans man to walk in the São Paulo Fashion Week.

He has walked for Ellus, Cavalera, and has been featured in fashion editorials for publications like Marie Claire. Porto has appeared on the covers of major Brazilian fashion magazines. He participated in the Proud My Calvins underwear campaign for Calvin Klein and acquired international notoriety with prominent coverage in media such as The Washington Post. Porto is a member of the Way Model roster.

== Biography ==
Porto was born in Brasília in 1995. He debuted as a model in 2019 and was the first trans man to walk in the São Paulo Fashion Week. He made a significant impact on the runway by kneeling and advocating for trans respect with the words "respeito trans" (trans respect) written on his abdomen. The model also posed for Mario Testino, for ÁLG by Alexandre Herchcovitch, appeared on the cover of Vogue, walked for Ellus, Cavalera, and was featured in fashion editorials for publications like Marie Claire. Porto's performance earned him international attention, being featured in publications such as The Washington Post. He is a member of the Way Model roster and is also part of Rock MGT.

Porto has appeared on the covers of major Brazilian fashion magazines. He participated in the Proud My Calvins underwear campaign for Calvin Klein.

After a photograph of Bianca Andrade on Instagram kissing Porto for an advertising campaign, rumors circulated that the two had been in a relationship since November 2022. Bianca debunked the rumor on TV Fama, telling viewers it was just a professional shoot.
