= Schizophrenia (Sepultura album) =

Studio album by Sepultura
- Released: October 30, 1987
- Recorded: August 1987
- Studio: J. G. Estudio (Belo Horizonte, Brazil)
- Genre: Thrash metal; death metal
- Length: 37:49
- Label: Cogumelo (Brazil); Roadrunner Records (International)
- Producer: Sepultura; Tarso Senra

Sepultura chronology
| Morbid Visions (1986) | Schizophrenia (1987) | Beneath the Remains (1989) |

Professional ratings
Review scores
| Source | Rating |
|---|---|
| AllMusic | 4/5 stars |

Schizophrenia is the second studio album by Brazilian heavy metal band Sepultura, released on October 30, 1987 by Cogumelo Records. It is the first album for the band with Andreas Kisser. All songs were recorded during August 1987. The reissue of 1990 has a bonus track, "Troops of Doom", which was recorded during August 26–27, 1990.

In America the band sent radio playlists at the time when they were struggling to book gigs because club owners were afraid to book them due to their style. Roadrunner Records signed them and released Schizophrenia internationally before seeing the band perform in person.

The album was re-recorded by Cavalera Conspiracy, featuring original Sepultura members Max and Igor Cavalera, and released on 21 June 2024. This re-recording received a perfect score from Jeff Podoshen of Metal Injection.

== Music ==
The album's sound leans more towards death/thrash metal than the previous album Morbid Visions, which is stylistically closer to black metal. Kisser states that, when he joined Sepultura in 1987, he:

...brought in some new influences - traditional heavy metal and a more melodic style. It was an immediate meeting of minds. We understood where each other was coming from musically and we knew we could find a way to put all our influences together and make the music work.

Jeff Podoshen of Metal Injection said: "Sepultura injected a unique flavor and some added melody into thrash metal, setting them apart from their American and European counterparts, many of whom were just emphasizing speed and aggression over anything else at the time."

== Reception and legacy ==
Eduardio Rivadavia of AllMusic gave Schizophrenia four stars out of five in a retrospective review. He said it was "the first Sepultura release to make serious waves with international critics and fans, while setting the stage for the group's imminent breakthrough release, Beneath the Remains."

In 2024, Jeff Podoshen of Metal Injection stated his belief that the band's songs were more innovative and memorable than their genre contemporaries. He said the album "stands as a pivotal moment in the evolution and history of thrash. [...] What Sepultura brought us were just some incredibly original rhythms and groove that made for a much more novel listening experience back in the day."

== Track listing ==
All lyrics are written by Max Cavalera and Andreas Kisser; all music is composed by Sepultura, except where noted.

| No. | Title | Length |
|---|---|---|
| 1. | "Intro" | 0:31 |
| 2. | "From the Past Comes the Storms" | 4:55 |
| 3. | "To the Wall" (lyrics by Vladimir Korg) | 5:36 |
| 4. | "Escape to the Void" | 4:38 |
| 5. | "Inquisition Symphony" (instrumental) | 7:13 |
| 6. | "Screams Behind the Shadows" | 4:48 |
| 7. | "Septic Schizo" | 4:31 |
| 8. | "The Abyss" (instrumental) | 1:01 |
| 9. | "R.I.P. (Rest in Pain)" | 4:36 |
| Total length: | | 37:49 |

1990 reissue
| No. | Title | Length |
|---|---|---|
| 10. | "Troops of Doom" (re-recorded in 1990, music and lyrics by Igor Cavalera, Jairo Guedz, Max Cavalera and Paulo Jr.) | 3:17 |

1997 remaster
| No. | Title | Length |
|---|---|---|
| 11. | "The Past Reborns the Storms (demo version)" | 5:08 |
| 12. | "Septic Schizo (rough mix)" | 4:34 |
| 13. | "To the Wall (rough mix)" | 5:31 |

== Personnel ==
Sepultura

- Max Cavalera – vocals, rhythm guitar
- Igor Cavalera – drums, percussion
- Andreas Kisser – lead guitar, bass (uncredited)
- Paulo Jr. – bass (credited, but did not perform)

Additional personnel

- Henrique Portugal – synthesizers
- Paulo Gordo – violins

Technical personnel

- Tarso Senra – engineering
- Gauguim – engineering on track 10
- Scott Burns – mixing on track 10
- Fabiana – photography
- Jeff Daniels – production (reissue)
- George Marino – remastering (reissue)
- Don Kaye – liner notes (reissue)

== Cover art ==
The album cover by Ibsen Otoni was inspired by the Scorpions's 1982 album Blackout and by Anthrax's 1985 album Spreading the Disease.

== Charts ==
Chart performance for Schizophrenia
| Chart (2022) | Peak position |
|---|---|
| Portuguese Albums (AFP) | 34 |
