= Morbid Visions =

Studio album by Sepultura
- Released: November 10, 1986
- Recorded: August 1986
- Studio: Estudio Vice Versa (Belo Horizonte, Brazil)
- Genres: Thrash metal; death metal; black metal
- Length: 33:30
- Labels: Cogumelo (Brazil); Roadrunner (International)
- Producer: Sepultura

Sepultura chronology
Bestial Devastation (1985)	Morbid Visions (1986)	Schizophrenia (1987)

Professional ratings
Review scores
Source	Rating
AllMusic	3/5 stars

Morbid Visions is the debut studio album by Brazilian heavy metal band Sepultura, released on November 10, 1986, by Cogumelo Records. It is the only studio album by the band to feature lead guitarist Jairo Guedz.

== Background and production ==
The production quality of the album was considered to be poor. In the liner notes of Roadrunner's reissue of the album (which includes the tracks from Bestial Devastation), Cavalera admits that the band neglected to tune their guitars during the recording. They were only starting to learn English at this point, so they had to translate the lyrics word-for-word using a dictionary. All pre-1992 releases of Morbid Visions featured the first movement of Carl Orff's Carmina Burana ("O Fortuna") as an unnamed introduction. This composition was left off the CD re-release, probably due to copyright issues. This would mark the last appearance of the group's original lead guitarist Jairo Guedz.

The album, alongside Bestial Devastation, was re-recorded by Max and Igor Cavalera under the Cavalera name in 2023.

== Music and lyrics ==
While later albums have a more political edge, Morbid Visions (along with the 1985 EP Bestial Devastation) is notable for Satanic themes and imagery. The band said many lyrics were fashioned after those of early extreme metal bands such as Venom and Celtic Frost (note the similarity of the album title to Morbid Tales).

== Reception and legacy ==
Eduardio Rivadavia of AllMusic gave the album three stars out of five in a retrospective review. He opined that the album "revealed a band of teenagers more preoccupied with shocking their parents than creating great music, and clearly still learning their craft. [...] Venom would have been proud."

== Track listing ==
All tracks are written by Max Cavalera, Igor Cavalera, Jairo Guedz, and Paulo Jr., except where noted.

No.	Title	Length
1.	"Morbid Visions"	3:23
2.	"Mayhem"	3:15
3.	"Troops of Doom"	3:21
4.	"War"	5:32
5.	"Crucifixion"	5:02
6.	"Show Me the Wrath"	3:52
7.	"Funeral Rites"	4:23
8.	"Empire of the Damned"	4:24
Total length:		33:35

Bestial Devastation 1991 reissue / 1997 remaster
No.	Title	Length
9.	"The Curse"	0:39
10.	"Bestial Devastation"	3:08
11.	"Antichrist" (lyrics by Wagner Lamounier)	3:47
12.	"Necromancer"	3:53
13.	"Warriors of Death"	4:10
14.	"Necromancer" (demo version)	4:00
15.	"Anticop" (live 1996)	3:02

== Personnel ==
- Max Cavalera – vocals, rhythm guitar
- Igor Cavalera – drums, percussion
- Jairo Guedz – lead guitar, backing vocals, bass (uncredited)
- Paulo Jr. – bass (credited, but did not perform)

== Sources ==
- Barcinski, André & Gomes, Silvio (1999). Sepultura: Toda a História. São Paulo: Ed. 34. ISBN 85-7326-156-0
- Sepultura (1986). Morbid Visions. [CD]. New York, NY: Roadrunner Records. The Sepultura Remasters (1997).
- Sepultura (1986). Morbid Visions. [Vinyl]. Belo Horizonte, MG: Cogumelo Produções.
