= Beneath the Remains =

Studio album by Sepultura
- Released: April 10, 1989
- Recorded: December 15–28, 1988
- Studios: Nas Nuvens Studio, Rio de Janeiro, Brazil
- Genres: Thrash metal; death metal
- Length: 41:48
- Label: Roadrunner
- Producers: Scott Burns; Sepultura

Sepultura chronology
Schizophrenia (1987)	Beneath the Remains (1989)	Arise (1991)

Beneath the Remains is the third studio album by Brazilian heavy metal band Sepultura, released on April 10, 1989. It was their first release by Roadrunner Records. Continuing in the death/thrash metal vein of its predecessor Schizophrenia (1987), the album had improved production and songwriting compared to the band's previous black metal-influenced works. It also marked the beginning of Sepultura's transition to a more technical, progressive sound heard on the next album Arise (1991). The album was the band's breakthrough in extreme metal circles, bringing them international attention in the scene. Though no singles were released from the album, the band's first music video was made for the track "Inner Self".

Retrospectively, the album has received acclaim as a classic in the thrash metal genre. According to vocalist Max Cavalera, Sepultura had "really found [their] style" on this album. In January 2013, Beneath the Remains was inducted into Decibel magazine's Hall of Fame, becoming the second Sepultura album to do so, the first being Roots. This induction would make Sepultura the first band to have more than one of their albums being featured in the Decibel Hall of Fame.

== Background and recording ==
Max Cavalera travelled to New York in February 1988 and spent a whole week negotiating with the Roadrunner label. Although they offered a seven-record deal to Sepultura, the label was unsure of the band's sale potential. The album's budget was a small amount by the label's standards ($8,000), but in the end the cost was almost twice its original budget.

Scott Burns, who had previously engineered records by death metal acts Obituary, Death and Morbid Angel, was the chosen producer. Burns agreed to work for a low fee ($2,000) because he was curious about Brazil. Sepultura spent the last half of December 1988 recording the album at Nas Nuvens Studio in Rio de Janeiro, from 8 pm to 5 am. The studio was specifically chosen because it was the one where some years before Brazilian rock band Titãs had recorded their classic album Cabeça Dinossauro, which impressed Sepultura. Burns had brought some drum equipment and Mesa Boogie amps to Brazil (a rare item for production standards at the time) which helped to improve the sound quality.

== Release and promotion ==
The album was released on April 10, 1989. The album reached no. 9 on the UK Indie Charts, and became the band's breakthrough in Heavy Metal circles. To support the album, the band went on their first tour outside of Brazil, opening for Sodom. The band also released their first music video, for the track "Inner Self", which received heavy airplay on Headbanger's Ball.

== Music ==
The album represents the conclusion of Sepultura's transition away from black metal, instead adopting elements of death metal and thrash metal, as well as influences from Black Sabbath and the early U2 and Corrosion of Conformity albums. The album was one of the earliest examples of the deathrash subgenre, and it is considerably more technical and progressive than the band's first two albums. Eduardio Rivadavia of AllMusic stated: "As soon as the deceptively gentle acoustic intro gives way to the title track's thrashing brutality, the listener is propelled at maximum speed and intensity through to the very last crunch of 'Primitive Future.'"

== Artwork ==
This was their first album to feature cover art by Michael Whelan. Sepultura had initially planned on using a different painting by Whelan, Bloodcurdling Tales of Horror and the Macabre; Igor Cavalera had even gone so far as to get part of the painting tattooed on his arm. Roadrunner Records convinced Sepultura to use Nightmare in Red as they felt it was better suited for Beneath the Remains. Monte Conner of Roadrunner later sent the original artwork to Obituary, who used it on their album, Cause of Death, which was released a year after Beneath the Remains. For years after the incident, Igor Cavalera was upset with Monte Conner for giving away their album cover.

The cover art is acrylics over pastels.

== Reception and legacy ==
Professional ratings
Review scores
Source	Rating
AllMusic	4.5/5 stars
Q	3/5 stars

Beneath the Remains has received critical acclaim. AllMusic writer Eduardo Rivadavia noted that the album "marked the band's transition from third-world obscurity to major contenders in the international extreme metal arena", and called it "one of the most essential death/thrash metal albums of all time."

== Track listing ==
All lyrics are written by Max Cavalera and Andreas Kisser, except where noted; all music is composed by Sepultura, except where noted.

No.	Title	Length
1.	"Beneath the Remains"	5:11
2.	"Inner Self"	5:07
3.	"Stronger Than Hate" (lyrics by Kelly Shaefer)	5:50
4.	"Mass Hypnosis"	4:22
5.	"Sarcastic Existence"	4:43
6.	"Slaves of Pain"	4:00
7.	"Lobotomy"	4:55
8.	"Hungry"	4:28
9.	"Primitive Future"	3:08
Total length:		41:48

1997 remaster
No.	Title	Length
10.	"A Hora e a Vez do Cabelo Nascer" (Os Mutantes cover for the 1989 tribute album Sanguinho Novo... Arnaldo Baptista Revisitado; lyrics by Arnolpho Lima Filho)	2:23
11.	"Inner Self (drum tracks)"	5:11
12.	"Mass Hypnosis (drum tracks)"	4:22

== Personnel ==
Sepultura

- Max Cavalera – vocals, rhythm guitar
- Igor Cavalera – drums, percussion
- Andreas Kisser – lead guitar, bass (uncredited)
- Paulo Jr. – bass (credited, but did not perform)

Guest musicians

- Kelly Shaefer (Atheist) – background vocals on "Stronger Than Hate"
- John Tardy (Obituary) – background vocals on "Stronger Than Hate"
- Scott Latour (Incubus) – background vocals on "Stronger Than Hate"
- Francis Howard (Incubus) – background vocals on "Stronger Than Hate"
- Henrique Portugal – synthesizers

Production

- Scott Burns – producer, engineer, mixing
- Sepultura – production
- Max Cavalera – mixing
- Monte Conner – executive producer
- Antoine Midani – assistant engineer
- Tom Morris – mixing at Morrisound Recording, Tampa, Florida, January 1989
- Jeff Daniel – producer (reissue)
- George Marino – remastering (reissue) at Sterling Sound, New York City
- Don Kaye – liner notes (reissue)

Artwork

- Michael Whelan – front cover illustration ("Nightmare in Red")
- Wesley H. Raffan – back cover photography from lightandshadow.com
- Mark Weiss – photography
- Eric de Haas – photography
- Twelve Point Rule, New York City – album redesign

== Charts ==
Chart (1989)	Peak position
UK Indie Chart	9

Chart (2020)	Peak position
Croatian Foreign Albums (TOTS)	3
German Albums (Offizielle Top 100)	96
Hungarian Albums (MAHASZ)	22
