= Stress (Brazilian band) =

Brazilian heavy metal band

- Also known as: Pingo D'água (until 1977)
- Origin: Belém, Pará, Brazil
- Genres: Heavy metal, speed metal
- Years active: 1974–1987; 1995–present
- Label: Dies Irae
- Members: Roosevelt 'Bala' Cavalcante; Paulo Gui; André Lopes Chamon

Stress is a Brazilian heavy metal band. They were among the earliest Brazilian metal bands, and recorded what is considered to be the first Brazilian heavy metal album, Stress.

== History ==
Formed in 1974 by the encounter of the future members of the group in a school, they were the first Brazilian metal band, and also the first to release an album. Their career began by playing songs by artists such as Rolling Stones, Nazareth, Sweet, Led Zeppelin, Black Sabbath, Deep Purple and other similar groups. The lineup of the time consisted of: ChamoneI Andre on drums, Leonardo Revenue on keyboards, Roosevelt Bala as the singer, Wilson Mota on guitar and Paulo Lima on bass. The first concert of the band, omitting various live performances for the anniversaries of the school, occurred in 1977.

In 1978 the band began to work on their first piece, under the influence of metal groups such as Judas Priest, Saxon and Iron Maiden, sung both in English and in Portuguese, but due to the desire of the fans who wanted to understand the lyrics, all lyrics were rewritten in Portuguese.

The first album was released in 1982, called simply Stress. The album mostly consisted of a quite heavy brand of speed metal, occasionally bordering on thrash metal, in some parts accompanied by classic metal and hard rock influences. The lyrical themes of the album also focused on social issues, as an example the song Stressencefalodrama strongly denounced the policy of censorship and torture adopted by the Brazilian government in those years. Many of the songs still had to undergo changes to the lyrics or the titles due to the censorship of the time. The release of the album followed with a major success for the band, for example the song O Oráculo do Judas was one of the most successful songs on radio stations in Rio de Janeiro, making the band gather many fans and bringing it to the attention of Brazilian media.

Three years after the release of their album, Stress returned to the market with their second album, Flor Atômica, consolidating the status of cult band in the Brazil metal scene, a scene that would later be dominated by thrash metal groups like Mutilator, Atomic, Sepultura and Sarcofago.

After the release of the album the band continued to play concerts, but failed to produce another album and so they decided to disband in 1987.

In 1995 the band reunited and in 1996 they released a new album called Stress III, containing brand new and unreleased songs. The band never released any more material for 9 years, but in 2005 they released a demo with only one new song.

In 2019 the band released its fourth full length album, Devastação.

== Band members ==
=== Current members ===
- Roosevelt "Bala" Cavalcante – vocals, bass (1977–present)
- André Lopes Chamon – drums (1977–present)
- Paulo Gui – guitars (1983–present)

=== Former members ===
- Pedro Lobão - guitars
- Leonardo Renda - keyboards
- Wilson Motta - bass (1977-1979)
- Pedro Valente - guitars (1977-1983)
- Carlos Reimão - bass (1979-1982)
- J. Bosco - bass (1985-1986)
- Alex Magnum - guitars (1985-1986)
- Rick - bass (1986-?)
- Christian - guitars (1986-?) (deceased)
- Alex Scio - guitar (1988-1989)
- Alex "Xamba" Cotta - bass (1988-1989)

== Discography ==
=== Studio albums ===
- Stress (1982)
- Flor Atômica (1985)
- Stress III (1996)
- Devastação (2019)

=== Live albums ===
- Stress - Ao Vivo! DVD (2007)
- Live 'n' Memory (2009)

=== Compilation albums ===
- Amazon, First Metal Attack! (2009)
- Atomic Flower, Brazilian Metal Explosion (2010)
