= Bestial Devastation =

EP by Sepultura
- Released: December 1, 1985
- Recorded: August 1985
- Studio: J. G. Estudio (Belo Horizonte, Brazil)
- Genre: Thrash metal; death metal; black metal
- Length: 15:37
- Label: Cogumelo; Roadrunner
- Producer: Sepultura

Sepultura chronology
| Bestial Devastation (1985) | Morbid Visions (1986) |

Bestial Devastation is the debut extended play (EP) by Brazilian heavy metal band Sepultura, released in 1985 by Cogumelo Records.

It is the band's first official release, and originally appeared alongside Overdose's Século XX as a split album. The EP's songs were later released as bonus tracks on the CD version of Morbid Visions. The EP, alongside Morbid Visions, was re-recorded by founding Sepultura members Max and Igor Cavalera under their band Cavalera in 2023.

== Background and production ==
Due to the band's collective lack of money, most of the instruments used on Bestial Devastation were borrowed from friends and acquaintances. The vocals on the introductory track "The Curse" were performed by a friend of the band; according to drummer Igor Cavalera: "We had one of our friends come and do the voice for the intro ('The Curse') because he would do that voice without effects - he was kind of burping in a way. It was funny, so we had him come down and do it in the studio. I don't even remember his name!"

The band apparently fought with the producer during the recording. In an interview, Igor Cavalera said, "He wanted to clean everything up in the mix and we finally had to play him some records by Venom to show him that bands sounded this way."

Months before recording the Bestial Devastation EP, the band switched their lyrics from Portuguese to English. None of the band members knew how to write or speak the language, so they asked their friend Lino to translate their lyrics. An example of Lino's crude translation skills can be seen in one of the verses of the song "Antichrist":

Churches will be destroyed
Crosses will be broken
He's laughing in blasphemy
Like a domination of death.

== Cover art ==
The front cover is from an 60 cm × 60 cm oil painting by ex-bassist of the band Chakal, Sérgio "Destroyer" Oliveira, also known as "AlJarrinha". The painting only uses red and black on a white canvas. The demon portrayed is heavily inspired by a Conan the Barbarian painting by Boris Vallejo. The cover is re-imagined in the Ghost album Prequelle's cover art by Zbigniew M. Bielak which contains most of the same elements.

== Release ==
Professional ratings
Review scores
| Source | Rating |
|---|---|
| AllMusic | 3/5 stars |

Bestial Devastation was released in December 1985, alongside Overdose's Século XX EP. Over the next few months, it sold 8,000 copies. Sepultura's surprising success was partly attributed to the first Rock in Rio, which took place in Rio de Janeiro in January 1985. This music festival's line-up included Whitesnake, AC/DC, Iron Maiden, Queen, Ozzy Osbourne and the Scorpions, and was responsible for Brazil's hard rock/heavy metal boom.

The EP was later reissued by Roadrunner Records on one CD with Morbid Visions in 1997. It included a demo version of the song "Necromancer" that was the first studio recording of the band, and a live version of "Antichrist" from the Chaos A.D. tour, re-written as "Anticop".

Bestial Devastation was re-recorded and released in 2023 by Cavalera Conspiracy, a project of brothers Max and Igor Cavalera. At the same time, they released a newly recorded version of the 1986 album, Morbid Visions.

== Track listing ==
Bestial Devastation

All tracks are written by Max "Possessed", Jairo "Tormentor", and Paulo "Destructor" except where noted.

| No. | Title | Lyrics | Music | Length |
|---|---|---|---|---|
| 1. | "The Curse" | | | 0:39 |
| 2. | "Bestial Devastation" | | | 3:08 |
| 3. | "Antichrist" | Wagner "Antichrist" | Max "Possessed" | 3:47 |
| 4. | "Necromancer" | | | 3:53 |
| 5. | "Warriors of Death" | | | 4:10 |
| Total length: | | | | 15:37 |

Século XX

All tracks are written by Overdose.

| No. | Title | Length |
|---|---|---|
| 1. | "Anjos do Apocalipse" | 10:02 |
| 2. | "Filhos do Mundo" | 6:04 |
| 3. | "Século XX" | 5:03 |
| Total length: | | 21:09 |

== Personnel ==
=== Sepultura ===
- Max "Possessed" Cavalera – vocals, rhythm guitar
- Jairo "Tormentor" Guedz – lead guitar, bass (uncredited)
- Paulo "Destructor" Jr. – bass (credited, but did not perform)
- Igor "Skullcrusher" Cavalera – drums, percussion

=== Production ===
- Recorded and mixed in two days on 8 tracks in August 1985 at J. G. Estudios, Belo Horizonte
- Produced by Sepultura
- Back cover photo by Vânia Cavalera
- Remastered for the Roadrunner Records release by Michael Sarsfield at Frankford/Wayne, New York

== Sources ==
- Barcinski, André & Gomes, Silvio (1999). Sepultura: Toda a História. São Paulo: Ed. 34. ISBN 85-7326-156-0
- Sepultura (1986). Morbid Visions. [CD]. New York, NY: Roadrunner Records. The Sepultura Remasters (1997).
