= Rattus (band) =

Finnish hardcore punk band

- Origin: Finland
- Genres: Hardcore punk, crust punk
- Years active: 1978–1988, 2001–present
- Members: V-P drums; Jopo guitar, vocals; Jeekki bass (since 2023)
- Past members: Tomppa bass; Jake guitar, vocals; Annikki vocals

Rattus is a Finnish hardcore punk band that was formed in 1978 in Vilppula. They split up in 1988 but returned in 2001.

== Members ==
Current members
V-P - drums
Jopo - guitar, vocals
Jeekki - bass

Former members
Tomppa - bass
Jake - guitar, vocals
Annikki - vocals

== Discography ==
=== Albums ===
- WC räjähtää, 1982 (the Toilet Explodes)
- Uskonto on vaara, 1984 (Religion Is a Danger)
- Stolen Life, 1987
- Rattus, 2005
- Uudet piikit, 2007 (New Thorns)
- Turta, 2014

=== EPs ===
- Fucking Disco, 1981
- Rattus on rautaa, 1981 (Rattus Rocks)
- Rajoitettu ydinsota, 1982 (Limited Nuclear War)
- Ihmiset on sairaita, 1985 (People Are Sick)

=== Singles ===
- "Khomeini Rock", 1980
- "Win or Die", 1988

=== Collections ===
- Rattus, 1984, released in U.S. (Rat Cage Records) and Great Britain (Making Waves)
- BCT-8: Finnish Hardcore, 1984, cassette only release in the U.S. (Bad Compilation Tapes / Borderless Countries Tapes)
- Levytykset 1981-1984, 1993 (Recordings 1981-1984)
- Täältä tullaan kuolema, 1996 (Here We Come Death)
- 30th Anniversary of Rattus, 2007 in Malesia (Black Konflik Records)
