= Nadia Cavalera =

Italian writer

Nadia Cavalera (born 20 September 1950 in Galatone, Lecce) is an Italian novelist, poet and literary critic.

Cavalera attended the Liceo Classico "Palmieri" de Lecce and earned a bachelor's degree in Philosophy in the Università di Lecce, with the thesis "Democrazia e socialismo nel giovane Marx". She started her political activity in PCI when she was 20 years old. She worked in Brindisi for 12 years and since 1988, she has lived and worked as a teacher in Modena. She founded Brindisi's first entirely literary magazine, Gheminga. In 1990, she and the poet Edoardo Sanguineti founded and became editors of the journal Bollettario: quadrimestrale di scrittura e critica, issued three times a year, which is a publication of literature and literary criticism of the cultural association "Le avanguardie". The association proposes an avant-garde philosophy that can be permanent, non-elitist and open to the concept of umafeminità (a mix of uomo, man and feminità, femininity, a concept which sees men and women as equal despite their differences). In 2005, she founded the literary prize Premio Alessandro Tassoni, which is administered by the University of Modena and Reggio Emilia.

== Biography ==
Nadia Cavalera, born in Galatone (Lecce), graduated in philosophy from the University of Salento after graduating from high school. In Brindisi from 1976 -1988, he taught humanities subjects and worked as a journalist in the purely cultural field (at the Brindisi, Lecce and Taranto Newspaper, 1982 - 1988). She has lived in Modena since 1988. The only poet presented in “Third Wave,” which stigmatizes the avant-garde of the last twentieth century, Nadia Cavalera in her works has also written in Latin (Ecce Femina), English (Bluff/Americanata) and Galatian dialect (Salentudine).

He translated from Latin (“Hermit Dialogue” by Antonio Galateo), and French (“Soluble Fish” by André Breton).

He founded two journals: in Brindisi, Gheminga (1988, 0-3), the city's first exclusively literary magazine; in Modena, with poet Edoardo Sanguineti, Bollettario (1990 - 2010), a four-monthly journal of writing and criticism. From 2005 to 2018 she chaired the Alessandro Tassoni Prize (poetry, fiction, drama, nonfiction), organized by the Le Avanguardie Association, which she has directed since 1989. In some issues of Bulletin highlights his own civic, social and political engagement.

His writings are featured in several anthologies and he has collaborated with several specialist publications.

== Publications ==
=== Prose ===
- I palazzi di Brindisi – Schena, Fasano, 1986
- Nottilabio - Roma, La città della luna, 1995

=== Poetry ===
- Vita Novissima, Modena, Bollettariolibri, 1992
- Americanata, Modena, Bollettariolibri, 1993
- Ecce Femina, Napoli, Altri termini, 1994
- Brogliasso, Modena, Gheminga, 1996
- Salentudine, Venezia, Marsilio, 2004
- Superrealisticallegoricamente, Roma, Fermenti, 2005; Premio L'Aquila - Carispaq.

=== Wordvisual works ===
- Imprespressioni, 1970
- Adriana, 1972
- Golphe de Genes, 1975
- Sospensioni, 1980
- Amsirutuf: enimma, 1988
- I prestanomi: uomini senza, 1993
- La città della luna, 1997

=== Catalogues ===
- Superrealismo allegorico, Modena, 1993
- Superrealismo allegorico, Modena,1995
- Superrealismo allegorico, Modena,1997
- Superrealismo allegorico, Modena, 1999

=== Books about artists ===
- Il capo: lavoro, romanzo senza parole, 1991
- Stundaia, 1995
