= Jairo Guedz =

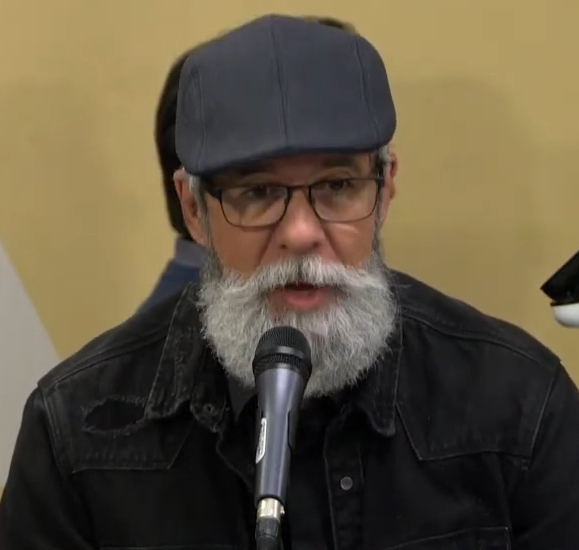
- Guedz in 2025

Background information
- Also known as: Tormentor; Jairo T.
- Born: Jairo Guedes Braga; 25 November 1968 (age 57); João Monlevade, Minas Gerais, Brazil
- Genres: Extreme metal
- Occupations: Musician; songwriter
- Instruments: Guitar; bass
- Years active: 1985–present
- Member of: The Troops of Doom; The Southern Blacklist
- Formerly of: Sepultura; Guerrilha; Overdose; The Mist; Eminence

Jairo Guedes Braga (born 25 November 1968), known professionally as Jairo Guedz, is a Brazilian guitarist and bassist, currently playing guitar for The Troops of Doom and The Southern Blacklist, and bass in a Metallica tribute band called Metallica Cover Brazil.

He was the lead guitarist of the heavy metal band Sepultura from 1985 to 1987 and was part of the short lived project Guerrilha alongside Igor and Max Cavalera and Sílvio SDN of Mutilator. He also played with The Mist, Overdose and Eminence.

== Early life and influences ==
Guedz was born on November 25, 1968, in João Monlevade, a municipality in the state of Minas Gerais. He got into music at the age of 10, listening to records of Elvis Presley, and from there his musical interest lead him to explore hard rock and heavy metal. His musical influences include Serge Gainsbourg, Leonard Cohen, James Hetfield and Lou Reed. Guedz started playing music at the age of 15, inspired by bands like Motörhead, Slayer, Voivod, Sacrifice, Possessed and Celtic Frost.

== Career ==
=== Sepultura ===
In 1985 Guedz met the Cavalera brothers during a concert in Belo Horizonte. Guedz was then invited to attend a rehearsal session of Sepultura. He got the opportunity to play with the members and ended up joining the band. His recorded output with the band includes the 1985 EP Bestial Devastation and the 1986 first full-length Morbid Visions. When playing with Sepultura he used the alias "Tormentor" and on occasion "Jairo T." In 1987 Guedz decided to leave Sepultura while the band was already writing music for the album Schizophrenia. He was replaced a week later by Andreas Kisser. In later interviews he cited a number of reasons for his departure, one of which that he was "looking for something different", musically speaking. To this day Guedz remains on very good terms with the former and current members of Sepultura and regularly joins them on stage to perform one or several songs from Morbid Visions. In 2005 he appeared on Sepultura's live DVD, Live in São Paulo, playing the songs Necromancer and Troops of Doom and in 2012 he joined Cavalera Conspiracy on stage at the Music Hall in Belo Horizonte and performed the song Troops of Doom with the band.

=== The Mist ===
In 1989 Guedz joined the thrash metal band The Mist as a substitute for the guitarists Reinaldo "Cavalão" Bedran and Roberto "Beto" Lima. He took part in the recording of the band's second album The Hangman Tree which came out in 1991 and enjoyed a fair amount of success in Brazil. In the same year, the band was offered a record deal from the British record label Music For Nations but turned it down, a decision Guedz later admitted to regret. After the departure of the singer, Vladimir Korg, The Mist carried on as a three piece and recorded in 1993 the EP Ashes to Ashes, Dust to Dust. In 1995 the band released the album Gottverlassen and embarked on the No Gods Tour where they played a series of headline shows and a number of opening shows for Kreator. In 1997 the remaining members decided to put an end to The Mist. Meanwhile, Guedz was invited by Overdose to fill in for their guitarist Sérgio Cicohvicz and went on tour with the band in Europe and America, opening for Mercyful Fate.

=== Eminence ===
In 1999 Guedz became the bassist for the death groove metal band Eminence which was formed in 1995 by guitarist Alan Wallace Bello. During the 6 years that Guedz stayed in the band they recorded the full-lengths Chaotic System and Humanology and toured extensively in Europe and South-America. In 2006 Eminence announced Guedz' departure citing "personal reasons" and "scheduling conflicts."

=== The Southern Blacklist ===
In 2014, Guedz co-founded The Southern Blacklist with former Eminence singer Wallace Parreiras, bass player Guilherme Henrique (Cyhad), drummer Alexandre Oliveira (Dilúvio), and guitarist Caio Ribeiro (Dilúvio). In March 2015, T.S.B. released their debut music video for the song "We Shall Rise". In 2016, they released their second video, for the song "10 Tons of Vengeance".

=== The Troops of Doom ===
In 2020 Guedz formed a new band called The Troops of Doom (taking its name from the Sepultura track he originally helped write and perform). With members including guitarist and artist Marcelo Vasco and vocalist/bassist Alex Kafer, they released their first EP The Rise of Heresy in October 2020, containing covers of early Sepultura tracks "Troops of Doom" and "Bestial Devastation".

== Personal life ==
Beside being a musician, Guedz designs figurines, runs an atelier and teaches miniature figure painting. He now lives in Belo Horizonte and has two sons, Igor and Érico Braga.

== Discography ==
Eminence

- 1999: Chaotic System
- 2003: Humanology

Guerrilha

- 1986: Live at Festival da Morte (demo)
- 1986: Guerrilha (demo)

Sepultura

- 1985: Bestial Devastation / Século XX (split)
- 1985: Bestial Devastation (EP)
- 1986: Rehearsal (demo)
- 1986: Morbid Visions
- 1990: The Lost Tapes of Cogumelo (split)

The Mist

- 1991: The Hangman Tree
- 1993: Ashes to Ashes, Dust to Dust (EP)
- 1995: Gottverlassen
