= São Paulo Fashion Week =

Clothing trade show in São Paulo, Brazil

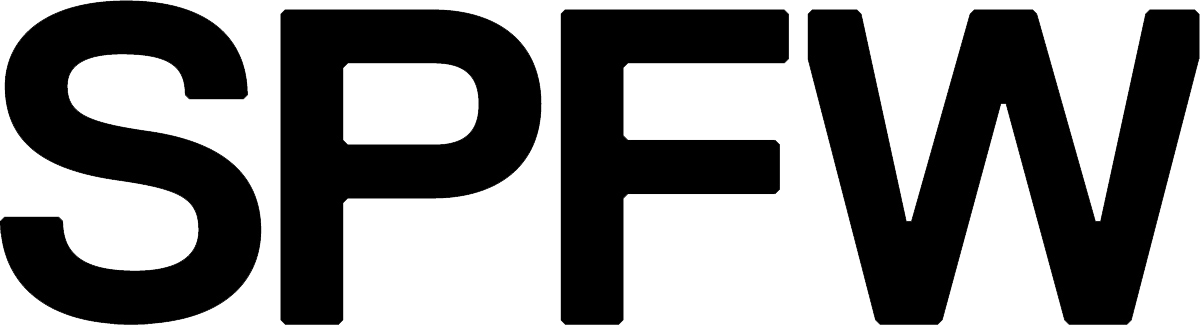

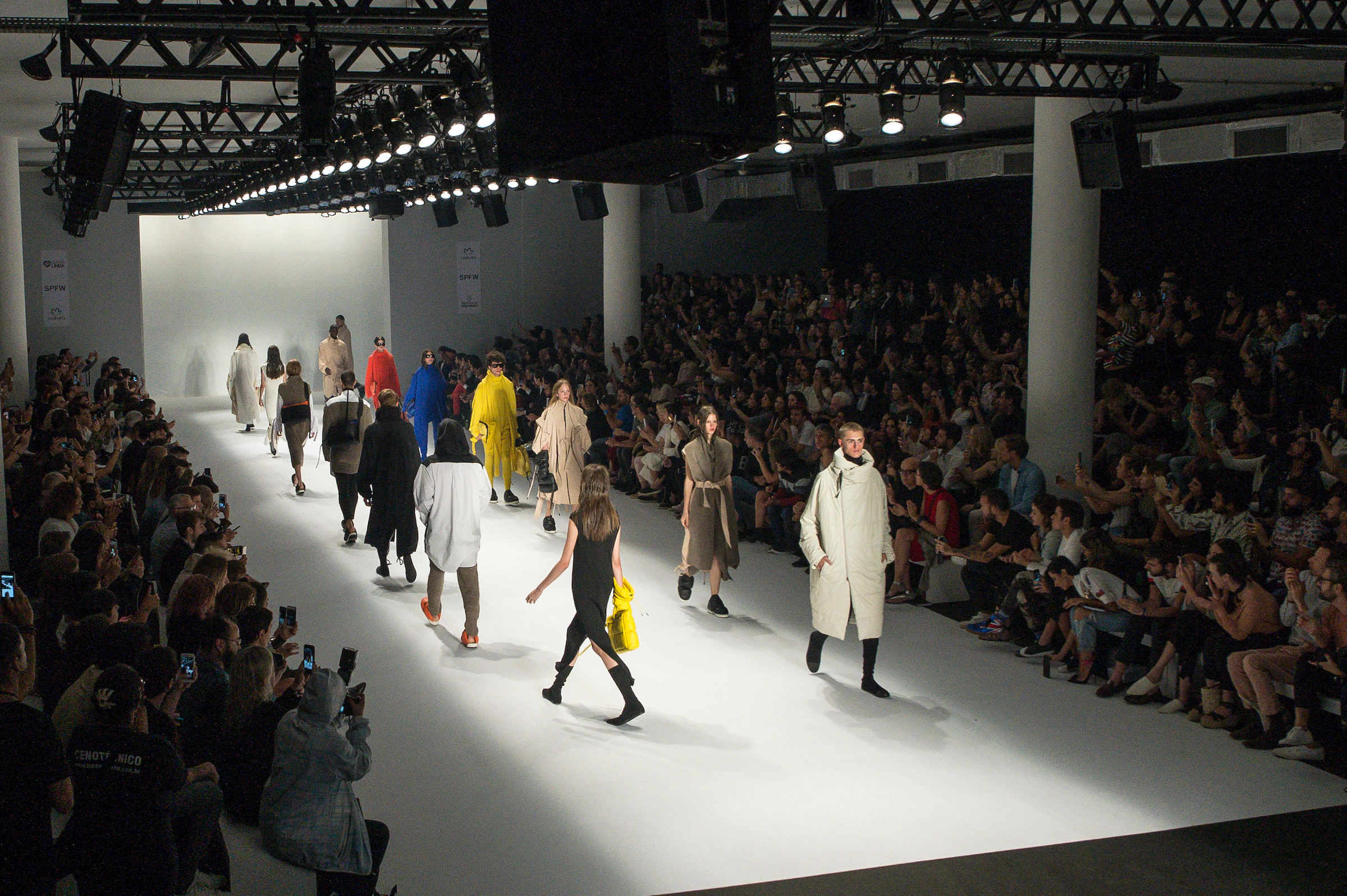
- Models walks the runway for Osklen, at São Paulo Fashion Week 2017
- Locations: São Paulo, Brazil
- Inaugurated: 1995
- Founder: Paulo Borges
- Organiser: Grupo Luminosidade
- Website: spfw.com.br

The São Paulo Fashion Week is a clothing trade show held semi-annually in São Paulo, Brazil. It is notable as "Latin America's pre-eminent fashion event" and it is the biggest of the fashion weeks, outside the Big Four of New York, London, Paris, and Milan, that have been established since the 1990s. It has been controversial in the past because of a "longstanding bias towards white models." In 2009 quotas were imposed that required that 10 percent of models to be "black or indigenous" as a way to foster equal opportunity. In its 2019, the show featured a male transgender model, Sam Porto, for the first time in its history.

In April 2019, male fashion model Tales Soares, artistically known as Tales Cotta, died after collapsing on the runway at the show. Soares was walking the runway when he suddenly stumbled and fell as he was about to exit. Soares received help after falling and was taken to a hospital where he later died.
