= Cavalera =

Cavalera is a surname. Notable people with the surname include:

- Max Cavalera, Brazilian heavy metal songwriter and musician, brother of Igor Cavalera
- Igor Cavalera, Brazilian heavy metal drummer, brother of Max Cavalera
- Nadia Cavalera, novelist, poet and literary critic
- Richie Cavalera, lead singer for rock band Incite, stepson of Max Cavalera
- Zyon Cavalera, drummer for rock bands Soulfly and Lody Kong, son of Max Cavalera

== See also ==
- Cavalera Conspiracy, heavy metal supergroup founded by the brothers Max and Igor in 2007
