= Fuel discography =

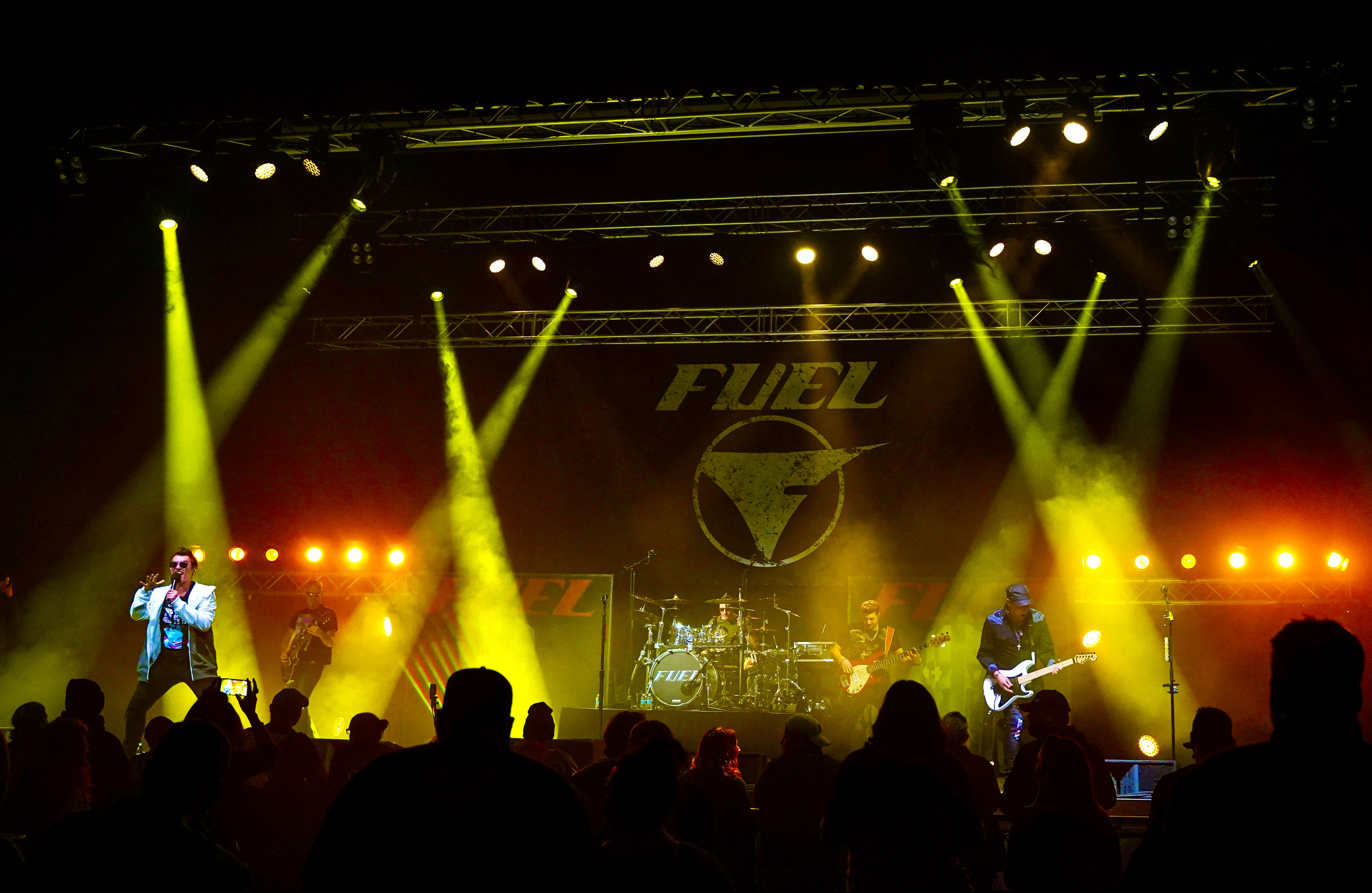
- Fuel performing in 2022
- Studio albums: 6
- Extended plays: 4
- Compilation albums: 2
- Singles: 21
- Music videos: 13

The discography of Fuel, an American rock band formed in 1989, consists of 7 studio albums, 4 extended plays, 2 compilation albums, 21 singles, and 13 music videos.

== Albums ==
=== Studio albums ===
| Year | Title | Peak chart positions | | | Certifications (sales thresholds) |
| Year | Title | US | AUS | NZ | Certifications (sales thresholds) |
|---|---|---|---|---|---|
| 1998 | Sunburn: Released: March 31, 1998; Label: Epic | 77 | 16 | 17 | RIAA: Platinum; ARIA: Gold |
| 2000 | Something Like Human: Released: September 19, 2000; Label: Epic | 17 | 6 | 8 | RIAA: 2× Platinum; MC: Gold |
| 2003 | Natural Selection: Released: September 23, 2003; Label: Epic | 15 | 64 | — | |
| 2007 | Angels & Devils: Released: August 7, 2007; Label: Epic | 42 | — | — | |
| 2014 | Puppet Strings: Released: March 4, 2014; Label: Megaforce | 77 | — | — | |
| 2021 | Anomaly: Released: October 22, 2021; Label: Moon Chair Media/ONErpm | — | — | — | |
| 2026 | Pendulum: Released: October 30, 2026; Label: Moon Chair Media | | | | |
"—" denotes a release that did not chart.

=== Compilation albums ===
| Year | Title |
|---|---|
| 2005 | The Best of Fuel: 1st compilation; Released: December 13, 2005; Label: Epic |
| 2008 | Playlist: The Very Best of Fuel: 2nd compilation; Released: October 20, 2008; Label: Sony Legacy |
| 2010 | Super Hits: 3rd compilation; Released: November 9, 2010; Label: Sony Legacy |

== EPs ==
| Year | Title |
|---|---|
| 1994 | Small the Joy: Released: 1994; Label: Self-released |
| 1994 | Fuel: 2nd self-release; Released: March 17, 1994; Label: none |
| 1996 | Porcelain: Released: May 1, 1996; Label: Self-released |
| 1998 | Hazleton: Released: March 17, 1997; Label: Epic |

== Singles ==
| Year | Title | Peak chart positions | | | | | | | | | | Album |
| Year | Title | US | US Alt. | US Main. | US Herit. | US Active | US Adult | US Pop | US Radio | AUS | ICE | Album |
|---|---|---|---|---|---|---|---|---|---|---|---|---|
| 1998 | "Shimmer" | 42 | 2 | 11 | 18 | 7 | 37 | — | 51 | 16 (Note: "Shimmer" and "Sunburn" were released as a double A-side single in Australia.) | 14 | Sunburn |
| 1998 | "Bittersweet" | — | 17 | 15 | 20 | 12 | — | — | — | 70 | — | Sunburn |
| 1999 | "Sunburn" | — | 31 | — | — | — | — | — | — | 16 | — | Sunburn |
| 1999 | "Jesus or a Gun" | — | 26 | 24 | 32 | 23 | — | — | — | — | — | Sunburn |
| 2000 | "Hemorrhage (In My Hands)" | 30 | 1 | 2 | 2 | 2 | 17 | 22 | 24 | 46 | 12 | Something Like Human |
| 2001 | "Innocent" | — (Note: "Innocent" did not enter the Billboard Hot 100, but peaked at number 13 on the Bubbling Under Hot 100 chart.) | 4 | 10 | 13 | 10 | — | — | — | — | — | Something Like Human |
| 2001 | "Bad Day" | 64 | 12 | 14 | 4 | 23 | 21 | 28 | 65 | — | — | Something Like Human |
| 2001 | "Last Time" | — | 25 | 21 | 16 | 21 | — | — | — | — | — | Something Like Human |
| 2003 | "Won't Back Down" | — | 37 | 22 | 22 | 21 | — | — | — | — | — | Natural Selection |
| 2003 | "Falls on Me" | 52 | 11 | 9 | 4 | 17 | 17 | 13 | 58 | 56 | — | Natural Selection |
| 2003 | "Million Miles" | — | 33 | 16 | 11 | 19 | — | — | — | — | — | Natural Selection |
| 2007 | "Wasted Time" | — | — | 24 | 16 | 25 | — | — | — | — | — | Angels & Devils |
| 2007 | "Gone" | — | — | — | — | — | — | — | — | — | — | Angels & Devils |
| 2013 | "Yeah!" | — | — | — | — | — | — | — | — | — | — | Puppet Strings |
| 2014 | "Soul to Preach To" | — | — | 30 | — | — | — | — | — | — | — | Puppet Strings |
| 2014 | "Cold Summer" | — | — | 39 | — | — | — | — | — | — | — | Puppet Strings |
| 2014 | "What We Can Never Have" | — | — | — | — | — | — | — | — | — | — | Puppet Strings |
| 2021 | "Hard" | — | — | 23 | — | — | — | — | — | — | — | Anomaly |
| 2021 | "Don't Say I" | — | — | — | — | — | — | — | — | — | — | Anomaly |
| 2021 | "I'm Gone" | — | — | — | — | — | — | — | — | — | — | Anomaly |
| 2021 | "Keep It Away" | — | — | — | — | — | — | — | — | — | — | Anomaly |
| 2026 | "Want It" | — | — | — | — | — | — | — | — | — | — | Pendulum |
| 2026 | "Pull Me In" | — | — | — | — | — | — | — | — | — | — | Pendulum |
"—" denotes a release that did not chart.

== Music videos ==
| Year | Title | Director | Album |
|---|---|---|---|
| 1996 | "Sunday Girl" | Unknown | Porcelain |
| 1998 | "Shimmer" | Josh Taft | Sunburn |
| 1998 | "Bittersweet" | George Vale | Sunburn |
| 1999 | "Sunburn" | Scott Lochmus | Sunburn |
| 1999 | "Jesus or a Gun" | S. Floyd Lochmus | Sunburn |
| 2000 | "Hemorrhage (In My Hands)" | Nigel Dick | Something Like Human |
| 2001 | "Innocent" | Nigel Dick | Something Like Human |
| 2001 | "Bad Day" | Nigel Dick | Something Like Human |
| 2003 | "Won't Back Down" | Robert Hales | Natural Selection |
| 2003 | "Falls on Me" | Martin Weisz | Natural Selection |
| 2007 | "Wasted Time" | Unknown | Angels & Devils |
| 2014 | "Soul to Preach To" | Unknown | Puppet Strings |
| 2014 | "Cold Summer" | Unknown | Puppet Strings |
| 2021 | "Hard" | Unknown | Anomaly |
| 2021 | "Landslide" | Kamp Kennedy | Anomaly |
