= The Best of Fuel =

The Best Of Fuel

Greatest hits album by Fuel
- Released: December 13, 2005
- Genres: Hard rock, post-grunge
- Length: 41:42
- Label: Epic

Fuel chronology
Natural Selection (2003)	The Best Of Fuel (2005)	Angels & Devils (2007)

Professional ratings
Review scores
Source	Rating
AllMusic	3/5 stars

The Best of Fuel is a compilation album by American hard rock band Fuel. It contains songs from their first three full-length albums, Sunburn, Something Like Human, and Natural Selection. All of the said albums featured vocalist Brett Scallions who departed from the group only a few months after the compilation's release. The Best of Fuel consists solely of the band's released singles, with the exception of "Million Miles" from Natural Selection (it features "Quarter" from the same album instead).

== Track listing ==
All songs written by Carl Bell.

No.	Title	Length
1.	"Hemorrhage (In My Hands)" (Something Like Human)	3:56
2.	"Won't Back Down (Bring You Hell Mix)" (Natural Selection)	3:23
3.	"Shimmer" (Sunburn)	3:33
4.	"Bad Day" (Something Like Human)	3:15
5.	"Last Time" (Something Like Human)	3:42
6.	"Falls on Me" (Natural Selection)	4:13
7.	"Jesus or a Gun" (Sunburn)	3:58
8.	"Sunburn" (Sunburn)	4:23
9.	"Bittersweet" (Sunburn)	3:51
10.	"Innocent" (Something Like Human)	3:40
11.	"Quarter" (Natural Selection)	3:39
