= Angels & Devils (Fuel album) =

Studio album by Fuel
- Released: August 7, 2007
- Recorded: Chop Shop Studios; Hollywood, California, from August until November 2006
- Genres: Alternative rock, post-grunge
- Length: 46:00
- Label: Epic
- Producers: Scott Humphrey, Carl Bell

Fuel chronology
The Best of Fuel (2005)	Angels & Devils (2007)	Playlist: The Very Best of Fuel (2008)

Singles from Angels & Devils
- 1. "Wasted Time" Released: June 19, 2007; 2. "Gone" Released: October 23, 2007

Angels & Devils is the fourth studio album by American rock band Fuel. Released on August 7, 2007, it was their first studio effort since 2003's Natural Selection and was the last Fuel album to feature original bassist Jeff Abercrombie. It was also Fuel's only studio album to feature new vocalist Toryn Green, and their final album for Epic Records. With a new singer, the album also introduced a new Fuel logo.

Former Godsmack drummer Tommy Stewart was announced as the band's new drummer but was unable to perform on the album due to other commitments so Josh Freese and Tommy Lee performed drums in his place.

== Background ==
Following the Natural Selection album and tour, longtime drummer Kevin Miller was dismissed from the group in 2004. In 2006 lead singer/guitarist Brett Scallions left the group as well, citing burnout and a lack of passion

After Scallions' departure from the group was announced, rumors began to rise that American Idol contestant Chris Daughtry might be in line to replace Scallions as Fuel's frontman. Daughtry had performed a version of the band's 2000 Top 40 hit, "Hemorrhage (In My Hands)" in one of his performances on the show and Bell has stated that several conversations occurred between Daughtry and the band reflecting the possibility of him joining the group, "[Daughtry] was saying ‘Hey if I don’t make this American Idol thing, maybe there is something that both of us can work out.'" Ultimately Daughtry would decline the opportunity to join the band, so Bell and bassist Jeff Abercrombie continued their search for a possible replacement for Scallions. Bell and Abercrombie felt there was a paucity of singers in the Los Angeles area, so they wound up allowing potential singers to send in their auditions through the internet. After going through a large number of audition tapes that were sent in and auditioning other singers, Bell and Abercrombie chose Toryn Green as the band's new frontman. Green was chosen as he had the image, preparation, and knew the lyrics to the songs he was singing during the audition.

== Writing, recording, and production ==
Bell spent more than two years writing material for Angels & Devils, drawing inspiration from the departure of former members Miller and Scallions as well as from his own relationship troubles. Bell had most of the album written and demoed before Green joined the group.

For the recording of the album, Fuel hired producer Scott Humphrey, who had previously worked with Rob Zombie and Mötley Crüe. Bell liked working and recording in Humphrey's studio, as Humphrey kept the instruments and amps miked up at all times, which allowed them to go back and change and/or add parts to songs that were recorded previously. According to Bell, "Most studios, as soon as you do the drums they will tear down the drums... So with Scott’s setup, that alone adds a different level of what you can do with as far as the record goes and as far as production style goes."

Angels & Devils is the first Fuel album where outside collaborators are credited in the songwriting.

== Promotion ==
The first single released off of the album was "Wasted Time," and was followed by "Gone" on October 23. The video to "Wasted Time" was released on September 24, there has been no mention about the possibility of a video being produced for "Gone."

On August 10, the band performed "Wasted Time" on The Tonight Show with Jay Leno.

WWE has used two songs off this album. "Gone" for their pay-per-view event Vengeance: Night of Champions, and "Leave the Memories Alone" for their tribute videos to the retiring wrestler Ric Flair.

The song "Again" was used in the previews for the fourth season of the TV series Prison Break.

== Reception ==
Professional ratings
Review scores
Source	Rating
Allmusic	2/5 stars
LiveDaily	favorable
PopMatters	6/10 stars
Ultimate Guitar	(7.3/10)

The album debuted at number 42 on the Billboard 200, selling approximately 15,000 copies in its first week. It sold 7,281 copies in its second week and approximately 4,854 copies in its third, bringing its total US sales to 27,358 copies.

While not many significant publications reviewed the album, critical response to Angels & Devils was largely marginal to negative. Many reviews echoed that the end result was solid but bland. Stephen Thomas Erlewine of Allmusic described the album as having decreased Fuel's heaviness, brightened up their production, and become more "generic" in having such a precise vocalist. He lamented, "The end result is pleasant but forgettable, something no rock band should be."

PopMatters' Andrew Blackie described the album as "an ultimately frustrating listen, awash in exaggerated dynamics and production but with no soul, one hook-filled standout sandwiched between horrible, corny, outdated post-grunge." In addition to criticizing the overly depressing and pessimistic lyrics, Blackie considered songwriter Carl Bell "a man afraid to commit and trust." And while noting that some of Fuel's hallmarks are still intact, he regarded Angels & Devils "merely a solid rock album, when it really had the potential to be great."

The album did, however, receive a heavily positive response from LiveDaily's Paul Gargano who claimed that it "succeeds because it doesn't try to be anything more than Fuel has ever been." Regarding vocalist Toryn Green, he noted the album "suffers none musically. . . In fact, in terms of sheer vocal ability, Fuel might be better served by the previously-unheard-of frontman." Gargano favorably highlighted numerous songs and repeatedly noted how Fuel's "middle-of-the-road arena rock" serves the band well.

== Track listing ==
All tracks are written by Carl Bell, except 2 (Bell, Marti Frederiksen), 8 (Bell, Keith Wallen), and 11 (Jeff Abercrombie, Ryan Giles, Toryn Green).

No.	Title	Length
1.	"Gone"	3:55
2.	"I Should Have Told You"	3:52
3.	"Forever"	3:42
4.	"Wasted Time" (G-Mix)	4:11
5.	"Leave the Memories Alone"	3:57
6.	"Mess"	0:13
7.	"Not This Time"	3:32
8.	"Scars in the Making"	3:25
9.	"Hangin Round"	3:48
10.	"Again"	3:57
11.	"Halos of the Son"	3:29
12.	"Angels Take a Soul"	3:47
13.	"Wasted Time" (S-Mix)	4:16
Total length:		46:00

Hastings Exclusive Track
No.	Title	Length
14.	"Wasted Time" (Live Acoustic)	4:22
Total length:		50:22

iTunes bonus tracks
No.	Title	Length
14.	"Shimmer" (Live Acoustic)	3:23
15.	"Hemorrhage (In My Hands)" (Live Acoustic)	3:56
16.	"Falls On Me" (Live Acoustic)	4:11
17.	"Forever" (Live Acoustic)	3:43
Total length:		61:13

- In the digital booklet there was a link to exclusive acoustic videos for "Hemorrhage" and "Gone".

== Personnel ==
Fuel

- Toryn Green – lead vocals
- Carl Bell – guitar, backing vocals
- Jeff Abercrombie – bass

Additional personnel

- Josh Freese – drums on all tracks except "Wasted Time"
- Tommy Lee – drums on "Wasted Time"
- Matthew Nelson – backing vocals
- Strings by Stefanie Fife, Kirsten Fife, and Jennifer Walton.
- String arrangements by Carl Bell and Stefanie Fife.

Production

- Scott Humphrey: Producer
- Michael Shipley: Mixing
- Ben Grosse: Mixing on "Wasted Time (G-Mix)"
- Brad Blackwood: Mastering
- Ted Jensen: Mastering
