= Puppet Strings =

Studio album by Fuel
- Released: March 4, 2014
- Recorded: Los Angeles March 2012-July 2013
- Genre: Hard rock
- Length: 41:10
- Label: Megaforce
- Producers: Brett Scallions, Eddie Wohl

Fuel chronology
Playlist: The Very Best of Fuel (2008)	Puppet Strings (2014)	Anomaly (2021)

Singles from Puppet Strings
- 1. "Soul to Preach To" Released: January 23, 2014; 2. "Cold Summer" Released: June 10, 2014; 3. "What We Can Never Have" Released: December 31, 2014

Puppet Strings is the fifth studio album by American rock band Fuel. Released March 4, 2014, it is their final album to feature original lead singer Brett Scallions, and the only Fuel album not to feature original songwriter/guitarist Carl Bell. Additionally, none of the album's personnel contributed to the recording of Fuel's previous album Angels & Devils (2007) or the next album Anomaly.

== Background ==
Fuel became inactive after their Angels & Devils tour in 2007-2008. In 2009 original lead singer, Brett Scallions, re-grouped Fuel under the moniker Re-Fueled which eventually became the new Fuel. On April 8, 2010, the reformation of Fuel was finally confirmed in an official press release. Also the Fuel MySpace and Facebook were updated with the new line-up and tour dates. The new band website is www.fuelrocks.com.

"There is only one original of anything" exclaims Scallions, "and that includes Fuel. The original lineup with Carl, Jeff, Jody and myself will always be something special to all of us, and our first Fuelies (a term for Fuel fans) but it has been thirteen years since the original lineup was intact, and since then many great musicians have come and gone. The lineup I put together for Fuel is not meant to replace or diminish what any of the original members created. Just the opposite, it is to give our fans a live destination, and to keep the Fuel name alive for a new generation to discover. Maybe someday we'll all get on the same page and play together again, but life happens and the next thing you know you just can't jump on a bus and take off for a month, let alone a year."

The new Fuel went through a few line-up changes. The original line-up included Brett Scallions on vocals/guitar, Yogi Lonich on guitar/vocals, Jeff Abercrombie on bass, and Ken Schalk on drums. Jeff left the band to be home with his family and was replaced with former Shinedown bassist Brad Stewart. In 2010, former Shinedown guitarist Jasin Todd joined the band to replace Yogi Lonich on lead guitar, however, Yogi then returned to the band in January 2011 and Jasin Todd left the band on good terms. Yogi was eventually dismissed from the band. Scallions stated that Lonich was not committed or loyal to the band. Scallions also hinted that there is in fact a new Fuel record in the works and also introduced the band's new lead guitarist, Andy Andersson. On April 30, 2013 drummer Ken Schalk announced his departure from the band citing reasons that if touring got in the way of family time it would be time to move on. On that same day Scallions announced new drummer Bryan "Keelgood" Keeling. The band will, however, keep Schalk's drum tracks. On June 26, 2013, Scallions announced that Bryan Keeling was going out on tour with Eric Sardinas in Europe and that Shannon Boone (current drummer for Puddle of Mudd) has joined the band.

== Production ==
Fuel entered the studio on March 8, 2012 with producer Eddie Wohl to begin recording Puppet Strings. In late September the band re-entered the studio to complete the guitar and bass tracks for the record.

As guitarist and main songwriter Carl Bell left the group by "mutual agreement" after recording 2007's Angels & Devils without Brett Scallions, Puppet Strings features songs written by Scallions, along with new members Andy Andersson and Brad Stewart. One exception is "Cold Summer", which was written by Scallions before 2003's Natural Selection album.

On April 30, 2013 Scallions commented on the new album; "The record has been recorded and is so close to being released for all of you I can taste it. There will be big announcements very soon regarding release dates, singles, videos, and much much more. Take care and we will see you all soon at a venue near you!"

Recently Scallions announced that the record is done and the band just needs to work out "a few bugs" and that "a record label is already on hand" although he did not mention which label yet. In a July 22, 2013 interview with the Oakland Free Press it was revealed that the new record had an album title, the title was revealed as Puppet Strings, which is also a potential title track with Robby Krieger of The Doors as special guest lead guitar.

Scallions confirmed that the new album was mixed by Ben Grosse who also produced and mixed Fuel's sophomore and most successful album Something Like Human from 2000.

It was announced through Guitar World on December 5, 2013 that the album indeed titled, Puppet Strings, will be released March 4, 2014. The song, "Yeah!" was released for free download on the website as well, although it was believed to be the first single, Scallions stated that it is not the first single, but rather a "teaser." The first single, "Soul to Preach To" was released February 4, 2014. A second single, "Cold Summer" was released June 10, 2014. A third single, "What We Can Never Have" was released December 31, 2014.

== Reception ==
Professional ratings
Review scores
Source	Rating
Allmusic	2.5/5 stars
Ultimate Guitar	(6.3/10)

Puppet Strings debuted at #77 on the Billboard 200.

== Track listing ==
All tracks are written by Andy Andersson, Brett Scallions, and Brad Stewart; except where noted.

No.	Title	Writer(s)	Length
1.	"Yeah!"		3:13
2.	"Soul to Preach To"		4:34
3.	"Hey, Mama"		3:39
4.	"Time for Me to Stop"		3:48
5.	"Wander"		5:42
6.	"Cold Summer"	Scallions, Eddie Wohl	3:56
7.	"I Can See the Sun"		4:10
8.	"Puppet Strings"		4:03
9.	"Headache"		3:16
10.	"What We Can Never Have"		4:49
Total length:			42:37

== Personnel ==
Fuel

- Brett Scallions – lead vocals, rhythm guitar
- Andy Andersson – lead guitar, mandolin (track 2), dobro (track 8)
- Brad Stewart – bass
- Ken Schalk – drums

Additional personnel

- Robby Krieger – guitar (guest appearance on track 8)

== Production ==
- Eddie Wohl – producer
- Ben Grosse – mixing
- Tom Baker – mastering
