= Porcelain (EP) =

EP by Fuel
- Released: May 1, 1996
- Genre: Grunge
- Length: 25:03
- Label: Moonchair Music
- Producers: Carl Bell and Randy Lane

Fuel chronology
Fuel EP (1994)	Porcelain (1996)	Hazleton (1998)

Professional ratings
Review scores
Source	Rating
Allmusic	3/5 stars

Porcelain is Fuel's third EP. The self-released compact disc sold over 5,000 copies. It was recorded, mixed and produced by Randy Lane and Carl Bell.

== Content ==
Released in 1996, this EP contains songs that were recorded for their debut studio album, Sunburn. Only two songs, "Nothing" and "Sunday Girl", did not make it to the final album, however, "Sunday Girl" was played live throughout the Sunburn tour and released on the "Shimmer" single.

== Track listing ==
1. "Ozone Baby (Sucker)" - 3:49
2. "Song for You" - 3:40
3. "Shimmer" - 3:13
4. "Nothing" - 3:20
5. "Sunday Girl" - 3:20
6. "Mary Pretends" - 3:25
7. "Hideaway" - 4:16

== Personnel ==
- Brett Scallions – lead vocals, rhythm guitar
- Carl Bell – lead guitar, backing vocals
- Jeff Abercrombie – bass
- Erik Avakian – keyboards, backing vocals
- Jody Abbott – drums
