= Falls on Me =

2003 single by Fuel

Single by Fuel

from the album Natural Selection
- Released: July 21, 2003
- Length: 4:14
- Label: Epic
- Songwriter: Carl Bell
- Producers: Michael Beinhorn, Carl Bell

Fuel singles chronology
"Won't Back Down" (2003)	"Falls on Me" (2003)	"Million Miles" (2003)

Music video
- "Falls on Me" on YouTube

"Falls on Me" is a song by American alternative rock band Fuel. It was released on July 21, 2003, as the second single from their third studio album Natural Selection. It is the second overall single from the album with "Won't Back Down" having been originally released on Daredevil: The Album a few months prior.

"Falls on Me" received moderate airplay on radio and MTV, reaching number 52 on the US Billboard Hot 100 in early 2004. It reached number nine and number 11 on the Mainstream Rock Tracks and the Modern Rock Tracks charts and become a crossover hit, peaking number 13 and number 17 on the Mainstream Top 40 and Adult Top 40 charts. The song was released as a CD single in Australia and peaked at number 56 on the ARIA Singles Chart.

== Background and writing ==
Written by Fuel guitarist Carl Bell, the song "Falls on Me" is about the difficulties of remaining in a monogamous relationship; according to Bell, "Everybody is hardwired to have some wanderlust in them... But that song comes from having a relationship and trying to honor it and not mess up something beautiful."

== Awards and nominations ==
Award	Year	Nominee(s)	Category	Result	Ref.
BDSCertified Spin Awards	2004	"Falls on Me"	100,000 Spins	Certified	
BMI Pop Awards	2005	"Falls on Me"	Most-Performed Song	Won	
BDSCertified Spin Awards	2007	"Falls on Me"	200,000 Spins	Certified	

== Track listing ==
All songs were written by Carl Bell except where noted.

Australian CD single

1. "Falls on Me"
2. "On the Road Again" (Floyd Jones, Alan Wilson)
3. "Shimmer"
4. "Won't Back Down"

== Charts ==
=== Weekly charts ===
Chart (2003–2004)	Peak position
Australia (ARIA)	56
US Billboard Hot 100	52
US Adult Pop Airplay (Billboard)	17
US Alternative Airplay (Billboard)	11
US Active Rock (Billboard)	17
US Bubbling Under Hot 100 (Billboard)	1
US Heritage Rock (Billboard)	4
US Mainstream Rock (Billboard)	9
US Pop Airplay (Billboard)	13
US Radio Songs (Billboard)	58

=== Year-end charts ===
Chart (2003)	Position
US Modern Rock Tracks (Billboard)	47
US Active Rock (Billboard)	49
US Heritage Rock (Billboard)	22

Chart (2004)	Position
US Adult Top 40 (Billboard)	48
US Mainstream Top 40 (Billboard)	46

== Release history ==
Region	Date	Format(s)	Label(s)	Ref.
United States	July 21, 2003	Mainstream rock; active rock; alternative radio	Epic	
Australia	September 8, 2003	CD	Epic; 550 Music	
United States	September 22, 2003	Contemporary hit; hot AC radio	Epic	
