= Caught in the Rain =

Caught in the Rain may refer to:

- Caught in the Rain (film), a 1914 film
- "Caught in the Rain" (song), by Revis, 2003
