= A Penny for Jane =

American rock band

- Origin: Las Vegas, United States
- Genres: Alternative rock Pop rock
- Years active: 2007–2012
- Labels: Quickstar Productions; Songram Records
- Members: Anthony Valentino; Denny Mishler; Craig David; David Guzman; Chris Bitonti
- Past members: John Wackerman
- Website: Official Website

Penny for Jane is an American rock band from Las Vegas, led by Anthony Valentino and Denny Mishler. The band started out as a songwriting partnership between Valentino and Mishler, but eventually grew into a full band ensemble.

== History ==
A Penny for Jane was formed in Las Vegas in 2007. The band consists of Anthony Valentino on vocals, Denny Mishler on lead guitar, Chris Bitonti on rhythm guitar, and Craig David on bass guitar. The music of A Penny for Jane has appeared on The WB, ABC, CBS, NBC and Lifetime on shows such as Smallville, The O.C., One Tree Hill, Friday Night Lights, and America's Next Top Model. The band has been featured in local and national press including Raw Vegas TV and Guitar Player magazine. Dashboard Confessional drummer Mike Marsh provides drums and some vocals for A Penny For Jane's EP. The group has opened for groups such as Lifehouse, Fuel, Paolo Nutini, Sara Bareilles and Colbie Caillat.

== EPs ==
- A Penny for Jane (2008)
