= Soul to Preach To =

Single by Fuel

from the album Puppet Strings
- Released: February 4, 2014
- Genre: Alternative rock, hard rock
- Length: 4:34
- Label: MegaForce Records
- Songwriters: Andy Andersson, Brett Scallions, Brad Stewart

Fuel singles chronology
"Gone" (2007)	"Soul to Preach To" (2014)	"Cold Summer" (2014)

Music video
- "Soul to Preach To" on YouTube

"Soul to Preach To" is the first single released from Fuel's album Puppet Strings. It is also the first single released featuring original lead singer Brett Scallions since Fuel's 2003 studio album Natural Selection.

About the song, lead singer Brett Scallions says, "Lyrically, 'Soul to Preach To' is about regret. I think we all look upon our past when we get to a certain age and think that there may have been things we could have done differently in our lives. When we recorded the song we tracked everything for the most part but something seemed to still be missing. Luckily my friend Slash let me borrow a dobro and the melody in the verses was then written. At that point the song felt complete."

The song peaked at number 30 on Billboard's Mainstream Rock Songs, staying on the chart for 11 weeks.

== Track listing ==
Song composed by Brad Stewart and Brett Scallions. Lyrics written by Brett Scallions. Ken Schalk is credited to performing drums on this track, however, left the band before the release of Puppet Strings.

No.	Title	Length
1.	"Soul to Preach To"	4:34

== Music video ==
A music video was filmed on January 28, 2014. The video features the band performing in the desert. The video features Shannon Boone on drums rather than Ken Schalk who left the band after the album was recorded.

== Personnel ==
- Brett Scallions - lead vocals, rhythm guitar
- Andy Andersson - lead guitar
- Brad Stewart - bass
- Ken Schalk - drums

== Charts ==
Chart (2014)	Peak position
US Mainstream Rock (Billboard)	30
