= Won't Back Down =

Won't Back Down may refer to:

== Songs ==
- "Won't Back Down" (Eminem song), 2010
- "Won't Back Down" (Fuel song), 2003
- "Won't Back Down" by YoungBoy Never Broke Again, 2023

== Other uses ==
- Won't Back Down (film), a 2012 drama film directed by Daniel Barnz

== See also ==
- "I Won't Back Down", a song by Tom Petty featured on his first solo album, Full Moon Fever
- "We Won't Back Down", a song by HammerFall on their album (r)Evolution
