= Million Miles (Fuel song) =

2003 single by Fuel

Single by Fuel

from the album Natural Selection
- Released: December 16, 2003
- Length: 3:53
- Label: Epic
- Songwriter: Carl Bell
- Producers: Michael Beinhorn, Carl Bell

Fuel singles chronology
"Falls on Me" (2003)	"Million Miles" (2003)	"Wasted Time" (2007)

Million Miles is a song by American rock band Fuel. It was released as the second single from the band's third studio album, Natural Selection, on December 16, 2003.

The song had already begun receiving airplay on American rock radio in early December 2003. In the December 12, 2003 issue of Radio & Records, "Million Miles" was reported with 61 plays on 18 stations and 11 new adds.

The song later peaked at number 16 on the US Billboard Mainstream Rock Tracks chart and number 33 on the Modern Rock Tracks chart. It also reached number 11 on the Billboard Airplay Monitor Heritage Rock chart.

"Million Miles" did not receive an official music video. The song has remained a popular deep cut among Fuel listeners and was later included on the 2008 compilation Playlist: The Very Best of Fuel.

== Charts ==
Chart	Peak position
US Mainstream Rock Tracks (Billboard)	16
US Modern Rock Tracks (Billboard)	33
US Heritage Rock (Billboard Airplay Monitor)	11
US Active Rock (Billboard Airplay Monitor)	19
