= Cold Summer (song) =

Single by Fuel

from the album Puppet Strings
- Released: June 10, 2014
- Genre: Alternative rock, post-grunge
- Length: 3:56
- Label: MegaForce Records
- Songwriters: Brett Scallions, Eddie Wohl

Fuel singles chronology
"Soul to Preach To" (2014)	"Cold Summer" (2014)	"What We Can Never Have" (2014)

Music video
- "Cold Summer" on YouTube

"Cold Summer" is the second single released from Fuel's album Puppet Strings. The song dates back to the early 2000s (decade) before the band's 2003 album Natural Selection. According to Scallions, the band had recorded the song several times and lost hope in it until producer Eddie Wohl convinced Scallions to record it for Puppet Strings.

== Track listing ==
Song composed by Brett Scallions and Eddie Wohl. Ken Schalk is credited to performing drums on this track, however, left the band before the release of Puppet Strings.

No.	Title	Length
1.	"Cold Summer"	3:56

== Music video ==
A music video was filmed in Agoura Hills, CA and features Scallions as a pool boy who stumbles in to a party.

== Personnel ==
- Brett Scallions - lead vocals, rhythm guitar
- Andy Andersson - lead guitar
- Brad Stewart - bass
- Ken Schalk - drums

== Charts ==
Chart (2014)	Peak position
US Mainstream Rock (Billboard)	39
