= Daredevil: The Album =

Soundtrack album by various artists
- Released: February 4, 2003
- Recorded: 2002
- Genres: Post-grunge; nu metal
- Length: 74:07
- Labels: Wind-up; Fox Music
- Producer: various artists

Singles from Daredevil: The Album
- 1. "Bring Me to Life" Released: January 13, 2003; 2. "Won't Back Down" Released: January 14, 2003; 3. "For You" Released: February 10, 2003; 4. "Caught in the Rain" Released: February 17, 2003; 5. "My Immortal" Released: December 8, 2003

Professional ratings
Review scores
Source	Rating
Allmusic	2/5 stars

Daredevil: The Album is the soundtrack album for the film Daredevil (2003), starring Ben Affleck. It was released on February 4, 2003 by Wind-up Records. Many of the songs on the album appeared in the film.

Two songs made specifically for the album were released as singles: Fuel's "Won't Back Down" and The Calling's "For You". Revis' "Caught in the Rain" and Evanescence's songs "Bring Me to Life" and "My Immortal", each also included on Daredevil: The Album, were included on the groups' own efforts and subsequently released as singles. "Bring Me to Life" won Best Hard Rock Performance at the 46th Grammy Awards, and Soundtrack Single of the Year at the Billboard Music Awards.

Three songs were omitted from release on the album: N.E.R.D.'s "Lapdance", Dara Shindler's "Faraway", and House of Pain's "Top o' the Morning to Ya". The album was one of the first collaborations between Marvel Comics and Wind-up Records, which would continue with the releases of The Punisher, Fantastic Four and the Daredevil sequel/spin-off Elektra.

== Track listing ==
Credits adapted from the album's liner notes.

No.	Title	Writer(s)	Producer(s)	Length
1.	"Won't Back Down" (Fuel)	Carl Bell	Michael Beinhorn; Carl Bell (co.)	3:22
2.	"For You" (The Calling)	Aaron Kamin; Alex Band	Marc Tanner; Aaron Kamin; Alex Band	3:42
3.	"Bleed For Me" (Saliva)	Josey Scott; Chris D'Abaldo; Wayne Swinny; Dave Novotny; Paul Crosby; Bob Marlette	Bob Marlette	3:59
4.	"Hang On" (Seether)	Shaun Welgemoed; Dale Stewart	Jay Baumgardner	3:10
5.	"Learn the Hard Way" (Nickelback)	Chad Kroeger; Mike Kroeger; Ryan Peake; Ryan Vikedal	Rick Parashar; Nickelback	2:54
6.	"The Man Without Fear" (Drowning Pool featuring Rob Zombie)	C.J. Pierce; Stevie Benton; Mike Luce; Rob Zombie	Scott Humphrey	3:20
7.	"Right Now" (Nappy Roots featuring Marcos Curiel of P.O.D.)	Marcos Curiel; William Hughes; Vito Tisdale; Ronald Wilson; Melvin Adams; Brian Scott	Marcos Curiel	4:33
8.	"Evening Rain" (Moby)	Moby; James Talley	Moby	3:53
9.	"Bring Me to Life" (Evanescence)	Amy Lee; Ben Moody; David Hodges	Dave Fortman	3:56
10.	"Until You're Reformed" (Chevelle)	Pete Loeffler; Sam Loeffler; Joe Loeffler	Chevelle	4:00
11.	"Right Before Your Eyes" (Hoobastank)	Douglas Robb; Chris Hesse; Daniel Estrin; Markku Lappalainen	Rich Costey	3:31
12.	"Fade Out/In" (Paloalto)	James Grundler	Rick Rubin	3:37
13.	"Caught in the Rain" (Revis)	Robert Davis; Nathaniel Cox; Justin Holman; Bob Thiemann	Don Gilmore	3:31
14.	"High Wire Escape Artist" (Boysetsfire)	Nathan Gray; Chad Istvan; Josh Latshaw; Matt Krupanski; Rob Avery	Dave Fortman	3:47
15.	"Raise Your Rifles" (Autopilot Off)	Chris Johnson; Chris Hughes; Phil Robinson; Rob Kucharek	Greig Nori	2:37
16.	"Daredevil Theme [Blind Justice Remix]" (Graeme Revell and Mike Einziger)	Graeme Revell	Graeme Revell	3:32
17.	"My Immortal" (Evanescence)	Amy Lee; Ben Moody	Ben Moody	4:23
18.	"Sad Exchange" (Finger Eleven)	Scott Anderson; James Black; Rich Beddoe; Sean Anderson; Rick Jackett	Johnny K	3:32
19.	"Simple Lies" (Endo)	Gil Bitton; Zelick Gimelstein; Eli Parker; Joe Eshkenazi	David Schiffman	4:07
20.	"Let Go" (12 Stones)	Paul McCoy; Kevin Dorr; Eric Weaver; Pat Quave	Jay Baumgardner; Dave Fortman (co.)	4:29
Total length:				74:07

Daredevil: The Album - EP
No.	Title	Writer(s)	Producer(s)	Length
1.	"Won't Back Down" (Fuel)	Carl Bell	Michael Beinhorn; Carl Bell (co.)	3:22
2.	"For You" (The Calling)	Aaron Kamin; Alex Band	Marc Tanner; Aaron Kamin; Alex Band	3:42
3.	"Hang On" (Seether)	Shaun Welgemoed; Dale Stewart	Jay Baumgardner	3:10
4.	"Sad Exchange" (Finger Eleven)	Scott Anderson; James Black; Rich Beddoe; Sean Anderson; Rick Jackett	Johnny K	3:32
5.	"Let Go" (12 Stones)	Paul McCoy; Kevin Dorr; Eric Weaver; Pat Quave	Jay Baumgardner; Dave Fortman (co.)	4:29

== Other appearances ==
- A remix of Fuel's "Won't Back Down" was later released on Natural Selection.
- Seether's "Hang On" appeared on the U.S. version of Disclaimer II.
- "Bring Me to Life" and "My Immortal" were originally recorded for Evanescence's debut album Fallen, which was released a month after the soundtrack.
- Nickelback's "Learn the Hard Way" appeared as a bonus track on The Long Road.
- Revis' "Caught in the Rain" was originally recorded for their debut album, Places for Breathing, though this album did not see release until three months after the soundtrack.
- BoySetsFire's "High Wire Escape Artist" appeared on their third album, Tomorrow Come Today, a few weeks after the soundtrack.
- "Simple Lies" later appeared on Endo's second album Songs for the Restless in July 2003.

== Charts ==
=== Weekly charts ===
Chart (2003)	Peak position
Australian Albums (ARIA)	38
Austrian Albums (Ö3 Austria)	55
Canadian Albums (Billboard)	9
French Albums (SNEP)	65
German Albums (Offizielle Top 100)	36
New Zealand Albums (RMNZ)	26
Swiss Albums (Schweizer Hitparade)	97
US Billboard 200	9
US Soundtrack Albums (Billboard)	2

=== Year-end charts ===
Chart (2003)	Position
US Billboard 200	126
US Soundtrack Albums (Billboard)	7

== Certifications ==
Region	Certification	Certified units/sales
United States (RIAA)	Gold	500,000^{^}
^{^} Shipments figures based on certification alone.
