= Million Miles =

Million Miles in music:

- "Million Miles", a song from the 1997 album Time Out of Mind by Bob Dylan
- "Million Miles" (Fuel song), 2003
- "Million Miles" (Reamonn song), 2009
- "Million Miles", a song from the 2014 album Kiss Me Once by Kylie Minogue
- "Million Miles", a 2020 single by Angelina Jordan
