= Innocent (Fuel song) =

2000 single by Fuel

Single by Fuel

from the album Something Like Human
- Released: December 5, 2000
- Length: 3:40
- Label: Epic
- Songwriter: Carl Bell

Fuel singles chronology
"Hemorrhage (In My Hands)" (2000)	"Innocent" (2000)	"Bad Day" (2001)

Music video
- "Innocent" on YouTube

"Innocent" is a song by American rock band Fuel, released on December 5, 2000 as the second single from their second studio album, Something Like Human. The inspiration for song's lyrical content is not known.

An official acoustic version with a piano melody surfaced online in 2015.

== Appearances ==
A music video was filmed, directed by Nigel Dick.

The song was originally going to appear on the soundtrack of the 1998 feature film City Of Angels, but songwriter Carl Bell felt the song was better suited to only appear on the band's album. The song was performed live on The Late Show with David Letterman.

== Personnel ==
- Brett Scallions – lead vocals, rhythm guitar
- Carl Bell – lead guitar
- Jeff Abercrombie – bass
- Kevin Miller – drums

== Chart positions ==
Chart (2001)	Peak position
US Alternative Airplay (Billboard)	4
US Mainstream Rock (Billboard)	10
