= Cold Summer =

Cold Summer may refer to:

- Cold Summer (Mustard album), 2016
- Cold Summer (U.S.D.A. album), 2007
- "Cold Summer" (song), by Fuel, 2014
- "Cold Summer", a song by Adonxs from Age of Adonxs, 2022
- A Cold Summer, a 2003 Australian film
