= Places for Breathing =

Studio album by Revis
- Released: May 20, 2003 (US); June 17, 2003 (Canada)
- Recorded: 2002
- Studio: NRG Recording Studios, North Hollywood, California
- Genre: Post-grunge
- Length: 41:11
- Label: Epic
- Producer: Don Gilmore

Revis chronology
Places for Breathing (2003)	Do We Have to Beg? (2011)

Singles from Places for Breathing
- 1. "Caught in the Rain" Released: February 17, 2003; 2. "Seven" Released: November 10, 2003

Professional ratings
Review scores
Source	Rating
Allmusic	2.5/5 stars

Places for Breathing is the first studio album by American post-grunge band Revis. Released in May 2003 on Epic Records, it was recorded in 2002 at NRG Recording Studios in North Hollywood. The album features the singles "Caught in the Rain" and "Seven" and debuted at number one on Billboard's Heatseekers chart.

== Writing and recording ==
All songs were written on acoustic guitar before being demoed. Guitarist Nathaniel Cox wrote all lyrics with some input by vocalist Justin Holman and Robert Davis. "A Gift," "Seven," and "Straight Jacket Labels" served as the band's first three demos produced by Tommy Henriksen and Jeff Pilson. They then recorded "Caught in the Rain" and "Spin" to encourage further label hype prior to being signed. Upon their joining Epic Records, Revis worked with famed producer Don Gilmore as well as Andy Wallace and Alan Moulder on mixing. In New York, Wallace provided mixing on two tracks while Moulder covered the remainder of the album.

Session drummer Josh Freese provided drumming tracks with the exception of "Your Wall" which was recorded by new Revis drummer David Piribauer.

== Touring and promotion ==
Revis toured with Oleander in early 2003 before headlining the second stage of Pearl Jam's tour. They also joined Creed as well as Cold and Evanescence on the first Nintendo Fusion Tour.

The first track, "Caught in the Rain," first appeared in the film Daredevil in February 2003 where it originally played as the last song in the closing credits, and was also included in its respective soundtrack album Daredevil: The Album. A music video was also produced with director Steven Murashige whose previous work included Incubus' "Pardon Me" and Rage Against the Machine's "Renegades of Funk." The song also appeared in the videogame MVP Baseball 2003.

"Seven" would serve as a follow-up single and managed to land on the Mainstream Rock chart.

== Track listing ==
All tracks are written by Nathaniel Cox, Robert Davis, Justin Holman, and Bob Thiemann.

1. "Caught in the Rain" - 3:28
2. "Your Wall" - 3:29
3. "Spin"- 3:08
4. "Seven" - 4:14
5. "Straight Jacket Labels" - 3:40
6. "Living Rooms" - 2:51
7. "Re Use" - 3:52
8. "City Beneath" - 3:32
9. "Everything After" - 3:21
10. "Places for Breathing" - 3:21
11. "Look Right Through Me" - 2:27
12. "Family" (hidden track) - 3:19

Unreleased Tracks

1. "From That Point On" - 3:24
2. "A Gift" - 4:15
3. "Shotgun Star (Bright)" - 3:25
4. "Butterfly Cry" - 3:25

== Personnel ==
Band

- Justin Holman – vocals
- Robert Davis – guitar
- Nathaniel Cox – guitar
- Bob Thiemann – bass
- David Piribauer – drums (on "Your Wall")

Other

- Josh Freese - session drums (all tracks except "Your Wall")
- Jason Taylor - DJ Turntables (Seven, Straight Jacket Labels, Look Right Through Me)
- Don Gilmore - production
- Andy Wallace - mixing (tracks 1 & 4)
- Alan Moulder - mixing
- Ted Jensen - mastering

== Chart positions ==
=== Album ===
Year	Chart	Position
2003	Billboard 200	115
2003	Billboard Heatseekers	1

=== Singles ===
Year	Title	Positions	
Year	Title	US Modern Rock	US Mainstream Rock
2003	"Caught in the Rain"	17	8
2003	"Seven"	—	29
