= Revis =

American rock band

- Origin: Carbondale, Illinois, US
- Genre: Post-grunge
- Years active: 1999–2005; 2010–2012; 2023–present
- Label: Epic (2002–2004)
- Members: Justin Holman; Robert Davis; David Piribauer
- Past members: Nathaniel Cox; Bob Thiemann; Dan Sronce; Marcus D'Marco; Kyle Needham; Simon Huber

Revis is an American post-grunge band from Carbondale, Illinois. Formed in 1999 under the name Orco, the band built a local following before moving to Los Angeles in the early 2000s. There, they signed to Epic Records and released their debut album, Places for Breathing, in 2003. Revis received mainstream attention with the single "Caught in the Rain", which peaked at no. 8 on the US Billboard Mainstream Rock chart and appeared on Daredevil: The Album, the soundtrack to the film Daredevil. Despite this success, Revis disbanded in 2005 while working on a follow-up album.

They reformed in 2010 but struggled to release new music. Despite extensive work on new material, including an EP named Fire and Ice and a full-length album titled Do We Have to Beg? reportedly being finished, internal disagreements between band members and the record label prevented further releases beyond a handful of promotional singles. After the abrupt cancellation of the album, the band announced their second breakup in 2012. In 2024, they reformed again and issued the EP Bottles of Lightning, and the full-length album Killing Time followed in November 2025.

== History ==
=== Early years (1999–2001) ===
The group, formerly known as Orco, was formed in 1999 in the small town of Ewing, Illinois. Their big break came when they beat out 40 other musical groups for the chance to compete against five bands at the radio station WTAO's battle of the bands at the DuQuoin State Fair in August 2000. They won the competition and were offered the opportunity to play live remotes for the station. According to vocalist Justin Holman, "It wasn't long after that that our songs began creeping onto (WTAO's) playlist." The original Orco lineup consisted of Holman, Robert Davis (guitar), Nathaniel Cox (guitar), Dan Sronce (bass), and Marcus D'Marco (drums). The band moved to Los Angeles in July 2001, with Bob Thiemann replacing Sronce on bass.

=== Places for Breathing (2002–2003) ===
In the early 2000s, the band recorded three demo songs, "A Gift", "Seven", and "Straight Jacket Labels", with producers Tommy Henriksen and Jeff Pilson. This eventually caught the attention of record labels, and demos for "Caught in the Rain" and "Spin" were subsequently recorded to maintain hype. In January 2002, the band signed with Epic Records to start work on their first album.

During this time, they were forced to change their name, as a British band by the name Orco already existed. They chose "Revis" after their close friend and guitar tech Jason Revis.

The debut album, Places for Breathing, produced by Don Gilmore, was released in May 2003. It opened at no. 1 on Billboard's Heatseekers chart, selling 10,000 copies in its first week, and peaking at no. 115 on the Billboard Top 200.

Revis released two singles, "Caught in the Rain" and "Seven", the first of which peaked at number 8 on the Mainstream Rock Radio charts during a 26-week chart run and remained on the Billboard Alternative Rock charts for 16 weeks, peaking at number 20. It was also featured in the movie Daredevil and its respective soundtrack, Daredevil: The Album. The second single, "Seven", charted on Billboard's Mainstream Rock chart but only peaked at number 29 over ten weeks.

The band's hometown of Carbondale announced May 19, 2003, "Revis Day", in tribute to the group.

Revis went on to support the album by touring with groups like Oleander and Evanescence and playing the 2003 Nintendo Fusion Tour.

=== Breakup (2004–2009) ===
In 2004, Revis recorded a second demo with Tony Berg and began work on a second album. Despite their rising popularity, however, the band was dropped by Epic Records and forced to acquire new management. Holman speculated that this was due to poor management and the merging of BMG and Sony. Around this time, Davis and Piribauer had joined another band, which led to questions over the future of Revis. Holman and Cox, without Davis, Piribauer, or Thiemann, returned to Illinois and began writing new material. In August 2005, Holman affirmed that he and Tommy Henriksen were working on 12–15 new songs. However, he clarified that they would not be working with Don Gilmore and expressed uncertainty about finding a label and touring. Later in the year, it was announced that Revis had disbanded.

=== Reunion, canceled album, and second breakup (2010–2012) ===
Reports of a Revis reunion surfaced in early 2010, saying that they were back together and working on a second album. However, guitarist Nathaniel Cox and bassist Bob Thiemann decided not to take part in the reunion.

The band originally announced two separate releases, an EP titled Fire and Ice and a full-length album to follow, titled Gone So Long. The two records were eventually consolidated into one album, titled Do We Have to Beg?

In the meantime, the band issued several singles, starting with "A Better Day (Relief)" in June and "Are You Taking Me Home" in October, which was mixed by Jay Baumgardner. Later that month, Revis played their first concert since reuniting, debuting the new track "Remember When". They also released a studio acoustic song called "Searching for Someone" as well as a re-recorded version of "From That Point On", a B-side from their first album.

In February 2011, the band announced that Do We Have to Beg? would be released in May, to coincide with the eight-year anniversary of Places for Breathing. The first single, "Save Our Souls", was issued on April 1.

Revis announced the Turnstyle Tour to support the album, but it was canceled one week before the album's projected release date. The album release was subsequently delayed indefinitely, due to undisclosed legal issues.

In June, the band issued a final track from the sessions, "Fire and Ice", as an apology and in recognition of their fans' patience. In August, they announced that legal issues kept them from releasing the album in its current form and that they were in the process of re-recording the entire project.

Months after the cancellation of Do We Have to Beg?, guitarist Robert Davis confirmed that Revis had disbanded. He summed up the band's label issues and eventual demise:

We had no contract with the label the whole time we were working with them, and they were helping us start our career and put money towards a tour... We went back to the same studio and had this conversation with Jay Baumgardner, and he said he'd love to sign us but they weren't close to getting contracts done. So we said let's start recording and get the ball rolling, and we did, but then this contract got presented to us that just wasn't fair. It just didn't make any sense, and we wouldn't have been able to survive off the terms. We went out and did a little bit of touring, and that got cut short because of the financing, and then we couldn't see eye to eye about the choice to keep going. I wanted to keep touring, Justin didn't. He wanted something more secure, and I said let's just play the shows because there were fans out there, but we just didn't see eye to eye. I'm not saying I was right or I was wrong, we just couldn't decide what we should do and we couldn't be together any more. Later on we had some more conversations that went in the same direction, and we couldn't see eye to eye. Eventually we just stopped talking. There were so many good songs that I want to get out there, but we just can't put them out with that band. I'm doing everything I can to help [the songs] see the light of day through other projects.

Davis also mentioned that some of the songs may still see release as part of a future Save Our Souls documentary soundtrack, which, despite the name, was not related to the Revis song but about the effects of Hurricane Katrina on the burlesque industry of New Orleans.

=== Second reunion, Bottles of Lightning, and Killing Time (2024-present) ===
In early 2024, Revis announced they were reforming a second time. Initial plans included a three-city tour with the band's original lineup. They also stated that they had been working on music privately since 2018. They subsequently released Bottles of Lightning, an EP containing six songs, in May. It featured four of the five original members: Holman on vocals, Davis and Cox on guitar, and Piribauer on drums. In August 2025, Revis announced plans to release a second studio album, Killing Time, which came out in November 2025. Melodic praised the album as proof that "Revis still knows how to write great songs...[the album has] the has same top-quality we love this band for".

== Musical style and influences ==
Revis's music has been described as post-grunge.

== Band members ==
Current

- Justin Holman – lead vocals (1999–2005, 2010–2012, 2024-present)
- Robert Davis – lead guitar (1999–2005, 2010–2012, 2024-present)
- David Piribauer – drums (2003–2005, 2010–2012, 2024-present)

Past

- Nathaniel Cox – rhythm guitar (1999–2005, 2024)
- Bob Thiemann – bass (1999–2005, 2024)
- Kyle Needham – guitar (2011)
- Simon Huber – bass guitar (2011)

== Discography ==
=== Albums ===
Year	Album details	Peak chart positions	
Year	Album details	US	US Heat.
2003	Places for Breathing: Released: May 20, 2003; Label: Epic; Format: CD	115	1
2012	Do We Have to Beg?: Released: Cancelled; Label: Format: CD	×	×
2024	Bottles of Lightning EP: Released: May 2, 2024; Label: Format: Digital, vinyl, CD	×	×
2025	Killing Time: Released: November 7, 2025; Label: Format: Digital, vinyl, CD	×	×

=== Singles ===
Year	Song	Peak chart positions		Album
Year	Song	US Alt.	US Main.	Album
2003	"Caught in the Rain"	20	8	Places for Breathing
2003	"Seven"	×	29	Places for Breathing
2011	"Save Our Souls"	×	×	Do We Have to Beg?
2025	"Killing Time"	×	×	Killing Time
2025	"Stardust (All Around Us)"	×	×	Killing Time
2025	"Cool Blacktop"	×	×	Killing Time
"—" denotes a release that did not chart.
