= Bad Day (Fuel song) =

2001 single by Fuel

Single by Fuel

from the album Something Like Human
- B-side: "Down" (demo); "Hemorrhage (In My Hands)" (demo)
- Released: May 29, 2001
- Studio: Right Track Recording, Sear Sound (New York City); The Mix Room (Los Angeles)
- Length: 3:15
- Label: Epic
- Songwriter: Carl Bell
- Producer: Ben Grosse

Fuel singles chronology
"Innocent" (2000)	"Bad Day" (2001)	"Last Time" (2001)

Music video
- "Bad Day" on YouTube

"Bad Day" is a song by American rock band Fuel from their second album Something Like Human (2000). It was released as the album's third single in May 2001 and peaked at number 64 on the US Billboard Hot 100 chart that August. Immediately following the September 11 attacks, Clear Channel deemed the song inappropriate for radio airplay due to its subject matter.

== Background and composition ==
Written by Fuel guitarist Carl Bell, "Bad Day" was written before the band was signed to a major label. The band tried to record a version for their major label debut, but according to lead singer Brett Scallions, "We tried recording 'Bad Day' back when we did the Sunburn album [in 1998] and just didn’t get it right. It was a song that was with us way before we signed on with Sony and Epic." According to the song's sheet music, the track is written in the key of A major, possessing a medium rock tempo that proceeds at common time.

== Release ==
"Bad Day" first appeared as the fifth track on Something Like Human, which was released in the United States on September 19, 2000. The song was released as the album's third single on May 29, 2001, when Epic Records serviced the track to US mainstream rock, active rock, and alternative radio. The following week, on June 5, it was sent to contemporary hit radio. Epic Records issued the single commercially in Australia, where a maxi-CD was released on September 10, 2001. This CD contains a rehearsal demo of album track "Down", a rehearsal demo of "Hemorrhage (In My Hands)", and an acoustic version of "Bad Day".

== Commercial performance ==
In the United States, "Bad Day" made its first chart appearance on June 16, 2001, when it debuted at number 34 on the Billboard Modern Rock Tracks chart and number 38 on the Mainstream Rock Tracks chart. On the former chart, the song peaked at number 12 on August 18, 2001, while on the latter, it reached number 14 the following week. The single remained on both listings for 18 weeks. "Bad Day" crossed over to adult pop radio, debuting on the Billboard Adult Top 40 in late June 2001 and climbing to its peak of number 21 on September 15, 2001, spending 26 weeks on the ranking; it was the chart's 40th-most-successful hit of 2001. It also charted on the Billboard Mainstream Top 40 ranking, spending 13 weeks on the chart and peaking at number 28 on September 22. On the Billboard Hot 100, "Bad Day" debuted at number 73 on July 28, 2001, reaching its peak of number 64 three weeks later to give Fuel their third top-75 hit. It spent 20 weeks on the Hot 100, making it the band's second-longest-charting single, after "Hemorrhage (In My Hands)".

== Music video ==
A music video was made for the song. At the beginning, lead vocalist Brett Scallions sits across a man with a cane and starts singing. The scene then changes to a woman who suffers various misfortunes, including spilling her coffee, breaking a heel on the sidewalk, and getting into a car accident. Throughout these scenes, Scallions becomes more emotional as he sings to the man, who writes in a book. At the video's conclusion, the woman walks into the room Scallions is in but fades away after she sits down beside him. As Scallions walks out, the man discovers the woman's now-fixed heels on the floor. The video was added to VH1's playlist on the week ending June 3, 2001, and to the playlists of MTV and MTV2 the following week.

== Track listing ==
All songs were written by Carl Bell except where noted.

Australian maxi-CD single

1. "Bad Day" – 3:15
2. "Down" (rehearsal demo) (Bell, Brett Scallions) – 3:24
3. "Hemorrhage (In My Hands)" (rehearsal demo) – 3:58
4. "Bad Day" (acoustic) – 3:08

== Credits and personnel ==
Credits are lifted from the US promo CD liner notes and the Something Like Human album booklet.

Studios

- Recorded at Right Track Recording, Sear Sound (New York City), and The Mix Room (Los Angeles)
- Mixed at The Mix Room (Los Angeles)
- Mastered at Precision Mastering (Los Angeles)

Personnel

- Carl Bell – writing, guitar, vocals, co-production
- Brett Scallions – lead vocals, guitar
- Jeff Abercrombie – bass guitar
- Kevin Miller – drums
- Ben Grosse – production, recording, mixing, programming
- John Parthum – recording
- Lloyd Puckitt – recording
- Jason Stasium – additional recording
- Lumpy – programming
- Tom Baker – mastering

== Charts ==
=== Weekly charts ===
Chart (2001)	Peak position
US Billboard Hot 100	64
US Adult Pop Airplay (Billboard)	21
US Alternative Airplay (Billboard)	12
US Mainstream Rock (Billboard)	14
US Pop Airplay (Billboard)	28

=== Year-end charts ===
Chart (2001)	Position
US Adult Top 40 (Billboard)	40
US Mainstream Rock Tracks (Billboard)	46
US Modern Rock Tracks (Billboard)	46
US Mainstream Top 40 (Billboard)	92

== Release history ==
Region	Date	Format(s)	Label(s)	Ref.
United States	May 29, 2001	Mainstream rock; active rock; alternative radio	Epic	
United States	June 5, 2001	Contemporary hit radio	Epic	
Australia	September 10, 2001	Maxi-CD	Epic	
