= Wasted Time (Fuel song) =

Single by Fuel

from the album Angels & Devils
- Released: June 19, 2007
- Recorded: 2006
- Genre: Post-grunge; alternative rock
- Length: 4:11 (G-mix), 4:16 (S-mix)
- Label: SonyBMG/Epic
- Songwriter: Carl Bell

Fuel singles chronology
"Million Miles" (2004)	"Wasted Time" (2007)	"Gone" (2007)

Music video
- "Wasted Time" on YouTube

"Wasted Time" is a song by the American rock band Fuel and the lead single from their fourth studio album Angels & Devils, released on June 19, 2007. Written by guitarist Carl Bell, it is the first single by the band to feature new lead singer Toryn Green. New Fuel drummer Tommy Stewart was unable to perform on the record as he had other obligations to fulfill, so longtime Mötley Crüe drummer Tommy Lee performed drums on the track.

Two versions appear on the album, a "G-mix" mixed by producer Ben Grosse (Something Like Human) and an "S-mix" mixed by Michael Shipley. While both versions are similar, the "S-mix" features fewer electric guitars than the "G-mix" does.

The song peaked at number 24 on Billboard's Hot Mainstream Rock Tracks, staying on the chart for 14 weeks.

On August 10, 2007, the band performed "Wasted Time" on The Tonight Show with Jay Leno.

== Music video ==
A video was made to promote the single; although, the video wasn't released until September 24, several weeks after the single was released to radio. The video features the band playing in the desert.

== Charts ==
Chart (2007)	Peak position
US Mainstream Rock (Billboard)	24
