= Do We Have to Beg? =

Unreleased studio album by Revis

Studio album by Revis
- Released: Unreleased
- Recorded: 2010–2011
- Genre: Post-grunge

Revis chronology
Places for Breathing (2003)	Do We Have to Beg? (2011)

Do We Have to Beg? was to be the second studio album by the American rock band Revis. It was originally set to be named Fire and Ice and to be released on July 27, 2010, but was later delayed to have several more songs added before release. It was then scheduled for release on May 20, 2011, exactly eight years since their first album, 2003's Places for Breathing, but was again delayed, one day before release, without explanation or future date.

The band eventually cited legal and monetary issues with their contract with the record label, resulting in them walking way from the session's material. While initial plans were to re-record the album from scratch, internal issues with band members kept the process from even starting, and a year later, in May 2012, it was announced that the band had disbanded, without any plans of releasing the album.

== Background ==
=== Origins as Fire and Ice EP ===
The band originally disbanded in 2005, two years after the release of their major label debut album Places for Breathing, but announced their reunion almost five years later in early 2010. The band had originally started work on a second album in 2004 after touring in support of Places for Breathing, but their disbandment in 2005 brought the album's progress to a halt. A few demos and song titles from those sessions surfaced over time, but the song "New Ways" was the only one that would resurface on future track lists.

With their reunion in early 2010, the band reported that they were working on a second album titled Fire and Ice. It was to be released on July 28, 2010, and contain seven songs, "Nothing to Do", "Are You Taking Me Home", "New Ways", "Fire and Ice", "A Better Day (Relief)", "Tell Me Why", and "Another Stand". On June 29, one of these songs, "A Better Day (Relief)", became available for free on the band's website. However, on July 5, 2010, weeks before the release date, they announced the delay of the album to mid-August in order to add more songs.

Despite the new time frame, August came and went without any announcement on a release date, let alone an actual release. The band did continue to work on music though. On August 9, 2010, the band announced they were recording again at NRG studios, the same studio in which they recorded Places for Breathing in 2003. In September 2010, the band announced that the next single would be "Are You Taking Me Home", and would be mixed by Jay Baumgardner. Additionally, on the night of their October 29, 2010 comeback show, the band made an acoustic version of "Searching For Someone" available for free download from their website.

=== Renaming to Do We Have to Beg and cancellation ===
In February 2011, the band announced that the album would now be named Do We Have to Beg?, would be a full-length release, and would be released on May 20, 2011 to coincide with the 8 year anniversary of the release of Places for Breathing. A track list wasn't announced, but some song information was revealed. An electric, full-band version of "Searching For Someone" was initially announced as the first single, but the band changed their mind and decided to release "Save Our Souls" as the first single. Additionally, the album was to consist of 12 songs selected from a group of 25 recorded songs. "Save Our Souls" was released on April 1.

While the band announced the "Turnstyle Tour" to support the album, the tour was canceled on May 13, just a week before the album's projected release date, due to circumstances that were beyond their control. After a week of silence and no promotion, the album release was quietly delayed indefinitely, without a new date, due to undisclosed legal issues.

In June, the band released a final track from the sessions, "Fire and Ice", as an apology and "thank you" for the patience from their fans. However, it wasn't until August, three months after the album delay, that the band announced that legal issues kept them from ever releasing the album in its then-current form, so they are currently in the process of re-recording the entire album. After four more months of silence, drummer David Piribauer reiterated the band's intent to re-record the album, blaming the lack of progress on his seriously injured leg.

After 4 more months of silence, almost a year after the album's initial release date, guitarist Robert Davis confirmed that Revis had disbanded. The issues regarding Do We Have To Beg? not being released involved what the band perceived as an unfair contract with the record label. The band disagreed about how to continue, re-recording of their second album never took off, and the band members eventually stopped contacting each other. There is still no intention to ever release the second album.

== Sound and composition ==
With the release, the band aspired for a more diverse and mature sound than their debut album Places for Breathing, including more traits of classic rock and alternative rock. One song was described by the band as a ballad with an Indian music influence, and a sitar.

== Track listing ==
Fire and Ice EP

1. "Nothing to Do"
2. "Are You Taking Me Home?"
3. "New Ways"
4. "Fire and Ice"
5. "Relief"
6. "Tell Me Why"
7. "Another Stand"

Do We Have to Beg

While an official track list was never revealed, many songs were revealed through single song downloads and live performances during the album's recording. Studio recordings of "A Better Day (Relief)", "Are You Taking Me Home?", "From That Point On", "Save Our Souls", and "Fire and Ice" were all released in 2010 or 2011. An acoustic version of "Searching For Someone" was released as well.

== Personnel ==
- Justin Holman – lead vocals
- Robert Davis – lead guitar
- David Piribauer – drums
