= Endo (band) =

American nu metal band

- A picture of the band included in the CD booklet for their second album

Background information
- Origin: Miami, Florida, U.S.
- Genres: Nu metal; post-grunge; rap metal
- Years active: 1995–2007; 2012–2013
- Labels: DV8; Columbia
- Past members: Gil Bitton; Eli Parker; Derek Gormley; Grover Norton III; Joel Suarez; Joe Eshkenazi; Lou Orenstein; Zelick

Endo was a four-piece nu metal group from Miami, Florida. They formed in 1995, released two major record label albums in 2001 and 2003, and worked on songs for a third before disbanding in 2007. In 2012, the band got back together with Gil, Eli and Joel, with their new bass player, Derek Gormley. Recording on their new album began early in 2013 with B-Team Records in Miami, Florida. The album was released in July 2013.

== History ==
The band was formed in 1995 by Gil Bitton and bassist Zelick. In 1996 drummer Joel Suarez joined the group, followed by Eli Parker. New York-based company, "Concrete Management" (Pantera, Ministry, Anthrax), signed the band in the late 1990s, where they opened for such bands as the Foo Fighters, Static-X, and Megadeth. They were later signed to DV8/Columbia Records, and released two major albums. In 2000, they appeared on the Loud Rocks compilation record, performing with Xzibit on a cover of the latter's song "Los Angeles Times".

Their first major album Evolve was released in 2001, and featured more of a rap-metal and nu metal sound. The band released a follow-up album, Songs for the Restless in 2003, but the band featured more of a post-grunge, straight rock sound, without rapping. They played at the Ozzfest Tour in 2003 in support of the album and opened for bands such as Korn, Chevelle and Marilyn Manson. In that same year their song "Simple Lies" appeared on Daredevil: The Album, released in conjunction with the movie Daredevil, starring Ben Affleck.

The band parted ways with DV8/Columbia in April 2004, and at the time were working on the recording of five new tracks. A year and a half later, in November 2005, they announced on their MySpace blog that a new album was close to being finished. In February 2006, they announced they were performing at a contest in their hometown of Miami, Florida, but no further news on the album.

About a year later the band finally made another statement, on January 1, 2007, that they were disbanding due to inner turmoil.

In 2012, the band got back together. They began playing live shows again in their hometown, Miami, FL. News of their new album began surfacing on the band's new Facebook page, and the first track from the upcoming release, "Get Low," has appeared on the band's YouTube channel. Also, the band added a new drummer named Grover L. Norton III to the line up for the upcoming tour.

As of 2013, Endo had disbanded once again.

== Band members ==
Final lineup

- Gil Bitton – lead vocals (1995–2007, 2012–2013)
- Eli Parker – guitar (1996–2007, 2012–2013)
- Derek Gormley – bass (2012–2013)
- Grover Norton III – drums (2013)

Past members

- Joel Suarez – drums (1996–2001, 2012)
- Joe Eshkenazi – drums (2003–2007)
- Zelick – bass (1995–2007)
- Lou Orenstein – guitar (1995–2000)

== Discography ==
Date of release	Title	Label
1996	Endo	Self Released
March 20, 2001	Evolve (v3.0)	DV8/Columbia Records
July 22, 2003	Songs for the Restless	DV8/Columbia Records
2013	Wake the Fuck Up	Self Released
