= Last Time (Fuel song) =

2001 single by Fuel

Single by Fuel

from the album Something Like Human
- Released: October 29, 2001
- Length: 3:40
- Label: Epic
- Songwriter: Carl Bell

Fuel singles chronology
"Bad Day" (2001)	"Last Time" (2001)	"Won't Back Down" (2003)

"Last Time" is a song by the American rock band Fuel originally released on their second album Something Like Human (2000) as the album's opening track. Written by guitarist Carl Bell, "Last Time" was released as the album's fourth and final single c. 2001, reaching number 21 on the Billboard Mainstream Rock chart.

"Last Time" is generally the opening song performed at their concerts.

== Charts ==
Chart (2001)	Peak position
US Alternative Airplay (Billboard)	25
US Mainstream Rock (Billboard)	21
