= Evolve (Endo album) =

Evolve (v3.0)

Studio album by Endo
- Released: March 20, 2001
- Recorded: 2000
- Studio: Criteria Studios in North Miami, Florida
- Genre: Nu metal; rap metal
- Length: 39:38
- Label: Columbia; DV8
- Producer: Paul Trust

Endo chronology
Evolve (v3.0) (2001)	Songs for the Restless (2003)

Professional ratings
Review scores
Source	Rating
Allmusic	3/5 stars

Evolve (v3.0) is the debut album by the Florida-based nu metal music group Endo. The album was released on March 20, 2001, via DV8 and Columbia Records (a division of Sony Music). The track "Malice" is present on the soundtrack for the film, Dracula 2000.

== Track listing ==
1. "Mindset" – 1:16
2. "Leave Us Alone" – 2:43
3. "Penicillin" – 2:32
4. "G.A.D." – 2:51
5. "Listen" – 4:11
6. "Drowning" – 0:39
7. "Suffer" – 4:00
8. "Malice" – 3:40
9. "The Program" – 3:26
10. "Beat Around the Bush" – 3:51
11. "Burn" – 4:08
12. "The Getaway" – 2:46
13. "Save Us" – 3:28

== Personnel ==
- Gil Bitton – vocals
- Eli Parker – guitar
- Joe Suarez – drums
- Zelick – bass

=== Production ===
- Tom Baker – mastering
- Chris Carroll – engineer
- Frank Cesarano – mastering
- Lou Orenstein – engineer
- Paul Trust – producer, mixing
- Kieran Wagner – engineer
- Neil Zlozower – photography
