= Songs for the Restless =

Studio album by Endo
- Released: July 22, 2003
- Genre: Nu metal; post-grunge
- Length: 43:20
- Label: DV8; Columbia
- Producer: David Schiffman

Endo chronology
Evolve (2001)	Songs for the Restless (2003)

Professional ratings
Review scores
Source	Rating
AllMusic	3/5 stars
melodic.net	3/5 stars
Sputnikmusic	3/5 stars

Songs for the Restless is the second album by the Florida-based nu metal music group Endo. The album was released on July 22, 2003, via DV8 and Columbia Records (a division of Sony Music). It was notable for its shift from the rap metal of their previous album to a more melodic post-grunge sound, though still maintaining the nu metal style the band known for.

The track "Simple Lies" is present on the soundtrack for the 2003 movie, Daredevil.

== Track listing ==
1. "Clean Sheets (And a Dirty Mind)" – 2:54
2. "Simple Lies" – 4:07
3. "For You" – 3:36
4. "Remember Us" – 3:24
5. "In Time We'll Fall" – 3:15
6. "Circles" – 4:25
7. "Madness" – 3:12
8. "Enemy" – 3:17
9. "Shame" – 3:01
10. "I Won't Die" – 4:31
11. "Ruckus" – 3:31
12. "Slowly Turning" – 4:02
13. "Disintegration" (Japanese import track) – 3:14

== Personnel ==
- Gil Bitton – vocals
- Eli Parker – guitar
- Joe Eshkenazi – drums
- Zelick – bass

=== Production ===
- Jason Cupp – assistant engineer
- John Halpern – photography
- Aaron Marsh – artwork, design
- Alan Mason – assistant engineer
- Dean Nelson – assistant engineer
- Jon Pikus – A&R
- Keith Sarkisian – booking
- Andrew Scheps – engineer, digital editing
- David Schiffman – producer, engineer, mixing
- Eddy Schreyer – mastering
