= Jesus or a Gun =

Single by Fuel

from the album Sunburn
- Released: April 20, 1999
- Genre: Hard rock, alternative metal
- Label: Epic
- Songwriter: Carl Bell (Note: The Sunburn liner notes state Bell as the sole writer of all the songs on the album, though BMI publishing lists Bell and Brett Scallions as writers of "Jesus or a Gun".)

Fuel singles chronology
| "Bittersweet" (1998) | "Jesus or a Gun" (1999) | "Sunburn" (1999) |

Music video
- "Jesus or a Gun" on YouTube

"Jesus or a Gun" is a song by American alternative rock band Fuel. It was released in April 1999 as the third single from their debut studio album, Sunburn. The track stands out among other Fuel singles due to its fast tempo and heaviness. When played on MTV or radio stations, the title is censored to read "Jesus or a ..." and the chorus lyric mutes the word "Gun".

== Charts ==
| Chart (1999) | Peak position |
|---|---|
| US Alternative Airplay (Billboard) | 26 |
| US Mainstream Rock (Billboard) | 24 |
