= Caught in the Rain (song) =

2003 single by Revis

Single by Revis

from the album Daredevil: The Album and Places for Breathing
- Released: February 17, 2003
- Recorded: 2002–2003
- Studio: NRG Recording Studios, North Hollywood, California
- Length: 3:28
- Label: Epic
- Songwriter: Justin Holman
- Producer: Don Gilmore

Revis singles chronology
"Caught in the Rain" (2003)	"Seven" (2003)

"Caught in the Rain" is a single by the American post-grunge band Revis that first appeared in the end credits to Daredevil and was also included in the film's soundtrack, Daredevil: The Album. It was released in April 2003 as the lead single from the band's debut album, Places for Breathing. The track was the band's highest-charting song, being a top-10 hit on the Billboard Mainstream Rock chart.

== Overview ==
The single peaked at #20 on the Alternative Songs chart on June 7, 2003, and stayed on the chart for 16 weeks. Over a month later on July 19, the song peaked at #8 on the Mainstream Rock chart, staying on the chart for 26 weeks.

== Music video ==
The song's music video was directed by Steven Murashige, who had previously directed videos for Incubus and Rage Against the Machine. The music video shows the band performing the song on a stage in a black room. The video cuts back and forth between the band performing and a woman sitting alone in a similar black room. As the video ends, the woman gets up and walks away.

== Track listing ==
All tracks are written by Revis.

No.	Title	Length
1.	"Caught in the Rain"	3:30
2.	"From That Point On"	3:25
Total length:		7:05

== Chart performance ==
Chart (2003)	Peak position
US Billboard Modern Rock Tracks	20
US Billboard Mainstream Rock Tracks	8

== Personnel ==
Revis

- Justin Holman – vocals
- Robert Davis – guitar
- Nathaniel Cox – guitar
- Bob Thiemann – bass

Additional

- Josh Freese – drums

Production

- Don Gilmore – production
- Andy Wallace – mixing
