= LiveDaily =

Entertainment site

LiveDaily was a music and entertainment site owned by Ticketmaster, created in 1998 and seen in the United States, Canada, and United Kingdom. It provided news updates, tour announcements, and ticketing information relative to Ticketmaster. Its news reports were used by media entities such as MTV News and the St. Louis Post-Dispatch. It also provided artist interviews, record and show reviews, and a music fan Internet forum. As of October 2008, livedaily.com claimed to have nearly one million visitors per month.

It also included LiveDaily Sessions, a video showcase for touring acts that especially emphasizes upcoming artists.

On May 18, 2010, LiveDaily closed their forums, a long-standing staple of the site for undisclosed business reasons. On May 21, 2010, LiveDaily ceased publication, with a message on their website reading, "LiveDaily takes its final bow".

On May 24, 2010, LiveDaily's editorial team announced the launch of SoundSpike.com, a publication promising to provide similar content to LiveDaily. The forums from LiveDaily also re-opened at a new domain, AfterLD.com. The forum domain no longer works.
