= Sunburn (Fuel song) =

Single by Fuel

from the album Sunburn
- Released: May 7, 1999
- Genre: Alternative rock, post-grunge
- Length: 4:23; 3:59 (radio edit)
- Label: 550 Music, Epic
- Songwriter(s): Carl Bell

Fuel singles chronology
"Bittersweet" (1998)	"Sunburn" (1999)	"Jesus or a Gun" (1999)

Music video
- "Sunburn" on YouTube

"Sunburn" is a song by American rock band Fuel. It was released in 1999 as the fourth single from their debut studio album Sunburn. It spent 9 weeks on the Billboard Alternative Songs chart in 1999, peaking at No. 31.

The song was featured on the Scream 3 movie and in a soundtrack movie Scream 3: The Album. A live acoustic version was also featured on the charitable album Live in the X Lounge.

"Sunburn" was released as the second track on a double A-side maxi single "Shimmer / Sunburn" in Australia on May 7, 1999. It spent 29 weeks on Australian charts, reaching No. 16 in August 1999.

== Track listing ==
=== Radio promo (1999) ===
1. "Sunburn" (radio mix) – 3:59
2. "Sunburn" (album version) – 4:23

=== Maxi single (Australia) ===
1. "Shimmer" – 3:34
2. "Sunburn" – 4:25
3. "Shimmer" (acoustic) – 3:20
4. "Sunday Girl" – 3:16
5. "Walk the Sky" – 3:20

== Charts ==
Chart performance for "Sunburn"
Chart (1999)	Peak position
Australia (ARIA) with "Shimmer"	16
US Alternative Airplay (Billboard)	31
