= Won't Back Down (Fuel song) =

Single by Fuel

from the album Daredevil: The Album and Natural Selection
- Released: January 14, 2003
- Genre: Alternative metal; industrial rock
- Length: 3:22
- Label: Wind-up Records
- Songwriter: Carl Bell
- Producers: Michael Beinhorn; Carl Bell

Fuel singles chronology
"Last Time" (2001)	"Won't Back Down" (2003)	"Falls on Me" (2003)

Music video
- "Won't Back Down" on YouTube

"Won't Back Down" is a song performed by the American rock band Fuel. Written by guitarist Carl Bell, the song was originally released as the lead single for the 2003 film soundtrack Daredevil: The Album. Eventually, the song would be included on Fuel's third album later that year, Natural Selection.

"Won't Back Down" is more industrial sounding than the rest of the band's catalog, which is partially due to the nature of the film, and also due to Bell having less than a week to write the song to meet Fox studios' deadline in order make the film and soundtrack. It is the first song played in the credits of the movie.

== Music video ==
The "Won't Back Down" video found considerable airplay on MTV2 and Fuse TV. It features clips from the movie, and Fuel is seen playing from atop a building with a helicopter flying around in the background. Brett Scallions then enters the building and makes his way to the top floor while searching for Daredevil's signature cane weapon. As he advances, a SWAT team follows Scallions through the building. The video is included on the second disc of Daredevil.

== Charts ==
Chart (2003)	Peak position
US Alternative Airplay (Billboard)	37
US Mainstream Rock (Billboard)	22
