= Bittersweet (Fuel song) =

Single by Fuel

from the album Sunburn
- Released: November 5, 1998
- Genre: Alternative rock
- Length: 3:51
- Label: Epic
- Songwriter(s): Carl Bell

Fuel singles chronology
"Shimmer" (1998)	"Bittersweet" (1998)	"Sunburn" (1999)

Music video
- "Bittersweet" on YouTube

"Bittersweet" is a song by American alternative rock band Fuel. It was released in November 1998 as the second single from their debut studio album, Sunburn.

It peaked at number 15 on the US Billboard Rock Mainstream chart in 1998. In Australia, "Bittersweet" peaked at number 70 on the ARIA singles chart in December 1999.

== Track listing ==
1. "Bittersweet"
2. "Bittersweet" (studio acoustic)
3. "Shimmer" (studio acoustic)
4. "Shimmer" (live acoustic)
5. "Jesus or a Gun" (live acoustic)

== Charts ==
Chart performance for "Bittersweet"
Chart (1998–1999)	Peak position
Australia (ARIA)	70
US Alternative Airplay (Billboard)	17
US Mainstream Rock (Billboard)	15
