= Something Like Human =

Studio album by Fuel
- Released: September 19, 2000
- Recorded: March–May 2000
- Studios: Right Track, New York City; Sear Sound, New York City; The Mix Room, Los Angeles
- Genres: Post-grunge; hard rock; alternative metal
- Length: 42:44
- Labels: 550; Epic
- Producers: Ben Grosse; Carl Bell (co.)

Fuel chronology
Sunburn (1998)	Something Like Human (2000)	Natural Selection (2003)

Alternative cover
- Expanded edition album artwork

Singles from Something Like Human
- 1. "Hemorrhage (In My Hands)" Released: September 14, 2000; 2. "Innocent" Released: December 5, 2000; 3. "Bad Day" Released: May 29, 2001; 4. "Last Time" Released: 2001

Something Like Human is the second album by American rock band Fuel, released on September 19, 2000, by Epic Records. Something Like Human peaked at number 17 on the Billboard 200, and was preceded by the single "Hemorrhage (In My Hands)", which peaked at number 30 on the Billboard Hot 100 and remains their highest-charting song. The album's title comes from the lyric heard on its sixth track, "Prove".

It remains Fuel's best-selling album. One year after its release, the album received double platinum certification by the Recording Industry Association of America (RIAA). The album also received gold certification by Music Canada (MC) in June 2001. Likewise with the band's previous album, it received moderate to average critical reception, with praise directed towards lead singer Brett Scallions.

The bonus version of the album includes an acoustic version of "Hemorrhage" and also includes the cover songs "Daniel", originally by Elton John, and "Going to California" by Led Zeppelin. In addition, these were also included on the album's bonus disc, which also contained the track "Walk the Sky" (previously made available on the reissue of the band's previous album), as well as music videos for "Hemorrhage (In My Hands)" and "Innocent" when inserted into a DVD player. The album's song "Empty Spaces" was used in the 2002 romance film A Walk to Remember, as well as its accompanying soundtrack.

== Critical reception ==
Professional ratings
Review scores
Source	Rating
AllMusic	3/5 stars
Robert Christgau	(dud)
The Encyclopedia of Popular Music	3/5 stars
Entertainment Weekly	B
The Rolling Stone Album Guide	2.5/5 stars

Ultimately giving the album a "B", Entertainment Weekly said the band "has more chops than a butcher shop. But when it comes to passion, Fuel runs low." The magazine concluded that "luckily, Bret Scallions' excoriating voice makes up for Carl Bell's rather clinical-sounding music." In its debut week, Something Like Human sold 60,458 copies, and during December 2000 alone the album moved almost 200,000 additional units. In 2001, Something Like Human sold a total of 1,180,000 copies in the United States, as reported by the SoundScan Year-end Top US Albums chart, where it ranked at number 83

== Track listing ==
All songs written by Carl Bell, except where noted.

No.	Title	Writer(s)	Length
1.	"Last Time"		3:42
2.	"Hemorrhage (In My Hands)"		3:56
3.	"Empty Spaces"		3:25
4.	"Scar"		3:16
5.	"Bad Day"		3:15
6.	"Prove"		2:54
7.	"Easy"		4:26
8.	"Down"	Bell, Brett Scallions	3:32
9.	"Solace"		2:57
10.	"Knives"	Bell, Scallions	3:18
11.	"Innocent"		3:40
12.	"Slow"		4:23
Total length:			42:44

Reissue
No.	Title	Writer(s)	Length
13.	"Hemorrhage (In My Hands)" (acoustic)		3:52
14.	"Daniel" (Elton John cover)	Elton John, Bernie Taupin	4:29
15.	"Going to California" (Led Zeppelin cover)	Jimmy Page, Robert Plant	3:52
Total length:			54:57

Bonus disc
No.	Title	Length
1.	"Hemorrhage (In My Hands)" (acoustic)	3:52
2.	"Daniel"	4:29
3.	"Going to California"	3:52
4.	"Walk the Sky"	3:18
5.	"Hemorrhage (In My Hands)" (Music Video)	3:52
6.	"Innocent" (Music Video)	4:23

- Early promotional press editions of the album (submitted to magazines, etc. for reviews) included the songs "Sister Mary Innocent" and the Scallions penned "Bruises", which ultimately were left off the final sequence of the album which was released to stores. Neither of these recordings have been released publicly by the band. "Sister Mary Innocent" appeared by alternate name "Sister Mary" on Tommy Lee's 2005 solo album Tommyland: The Ride, with Carl Bell on guitar.

== Personnel ==
- Brett Scallions – lead vocals, rhythm guitar
- Carl Bell – lead guitar, backing vocals
- Jeff Abercrombie – bass
- Kevin Miller – drums

Additional personnel

- Luis Resto – keyboards
- Carol Steele – percussion
- David Campbell – string arrangement on "Hemorrhage (In My Hands)"

Production

- Ben Grosse – producer and mixing
- Tom Baker – mastering

== Charts ==
=== Weekly charts ===
Chart (2000)	Peak position
Australian Albums (ARIA)	6
New Zealand Albums (RMNZ)	8
US Billboard 200	17

=== Year-end charts ===
Chart (2001)	Position
US Billboard 200	64

== Certifications ==
Region	Certification	Certified units/sales
Canada (Music Canada)	Gold	50,000^{^}
United States (RIAA)	2× Platinum	2,000,000^{^}
^{^} Shipments figures based on certification alone.
