= Hemorrhage (In My Hands) =

2000 single by Fuel

Single by Fuel

from the album Something Like Human
- Released: August 14, 2000
- Genre: Post-grunge
- Length: 3:57
- Label: Epic
- Songwriter: Carl Bell

Fuel singles chronology
"Jesus or a Gun" (1999)	"Hemorrhage (In My Hands)" (2000)	"Innocent" (2000)

Music video
- "Hemorrhage (In My Hands)" on YouTube

"Hemorrhage (In My Hands)" is a song by the American rock band Fuel. It was released on September 14, 2000 as the lead single from their second studio album, Something Like Human. It spent 12 weeks at number 1 on Billboard's Alternative Airplay chart, and a total of 40 weeks on the survey; in 2023, Billboard ranked "Hemorrhage" as the 12th largest hit in the chart's history. It also hit number two on the Mainstream Rock Tracks chart. To date, it is Fuel's highest charting single on the U.S. Billboard Hot 100 chart, peaking at number 30. It also peaked number 17 on the Adult Top 40 chart and number 22 on the Mainstream Top 40 chart.

== Background and writing ==
Carl Bell explained "Hemorrhage (In My Hands)" on an episode of VH1 Storytellers in 2001, stating: "This is as deep as it goes, for me. When I was younger, my grandmother got cancer. By the time they found it, it was much too late. Instead of sitting in some hospital, she wanted to go home and be home. And my mother and my aunts and their husbands went to sit with her at home. A few months passed, and the cancer had spread, it had eaten up most of her body and all of her hope, and it was a bad time. One particular day was a really bad day for her. My mother was sitting with her that evening, and she turned to my mom, and said, 'How do you die?' It crushed my mom, and it's still crushing for me." This initial version of the song was never recorded because it was too personal for Bell.

[The first verse] deals with the male point of view of a relationship that you've gotten burned on, and the person has come back to you. But by then, there's been damage beyond repair. The second verse kind of shows the vulnerability of the girl... It's always an interesting situation and a pretty wrenching one as well.

== Reception ==
The song was Billboard magazine's number five Rock Song of the Decade, according to their Best of the 2000s Rock Songs chart. In 2023, for the 35th anniversary of Alternative Airplay, Billboard published a list of the top 100 most successful songs in the history of the chart; "Hemorrhage" was ranked at number 12.

== Awards and nominations ==
Award	Year	Nominee(s)	Category	Result	Ref.
BMI Pop Awards	2002	"Hemorrhage (In My Hands)"	Most-Performed Song	Won	
BDSCertified Spin Awards	2006	"Hemorrhage (In My Hands)"	500,000 Spins	Certified	

== Music video ==
The music video for "Hemorrhage (In My Hands)" was directed by Nigel Dick and was filmed between August 1–2, 2000 at Kitchener City Hall in Kitchener, Ontario, Canada and features Fuel performing as well as Nick Koppell and Szilvia Jones playing a couple. The red car is a 1971 Buick Riviera.

== American Idol ==
Chris Daughtry performed this song on American Idol as a fifth season contestant in early 2006, which was during the period after longtime singer and guitarist Brett Scallions had left the group, prompting Fuel bassist Jeff Abercrombie and guitarist and songwriter Carl Bell to publicly ask Daughtry to be their new lead singer on the television show Extra. On the show, Abercrombie stated: "Chris, if you are watching, we've talked about this before, and if you want to entertain it again we'll take it and go..." Daughtry, although flattered, eventually declined the offer, opting to form his own band, Daughtry, instead.

== Track listing ==
1. "Hemorrhage (In My Hands)"
2. "Easy"
3. "Stripped Away"
4. "Going to California" (Led Zeppelin cover, written by Jimmy Page, Robert Plant)

== Personnel ==
- Brett Scallions – vocals
- Carl Bell – guitar, backing vocals
- Jeff Abercrombie – bass
- Kevin Miller – drums
- Ben Grosse – producer, engineer, mixing
- Tom Baker – mastering

== Charts ==
=== Weekly charts ===
Weekly chart performance for "Hemorrhage (In My Hands)"
Chart (2000–2001)	Peak position
Australia (ARIA)	46
Canada Rock/Alternative (RPM)	11
Iceland (Íslenski Listinn)	12
US Billboard Hot 100	30
US Adult Pop Airplay (Billboard)	17
US Alternative Airplay (Billboard)	1
US Active Rock (Billboard)	2
US Heritage Rock (Billboard)	2
US Mainstream Rock (Billboard)	2
US Pop Airplay (Billboard)	22
US Radio Songs (Billboard)	24

=== Year-end charts ===
Year-end chart performance for "Hemorrhage (In My Hands)"
Chart (2001)	Position
US Billboard Hot 100	100

=== Decade-end charts ===
Decade-end chart performance for "Hemorrhage (In My Hands)"
Chart (2000–2009)	Peak position
US Hot Alternative Songs (Billboard)	17
US Hot Rock Songs (Billboard)	5

== Certifications ==
Certifications for "Hemorrhage (In My Hands)"
Region	Certification	Certified units/sales
New Zealand (RMNZ)	Platinum	30,000^{‡}
^{‡} Sales+streaming figures based on certification alone.
