= Shimmer (Fuel song) =

1996 song by Fuel

Single by Fuel

from the album Sunburn
- B-side: "Walk the Sky"; "Sunday Girl"
- Released: February 23, 1998
- Studio: Southern Tracks (Atlanta, Georgia)
- Genre: Post-grunge; alternative rock
- Length: 3:34
- Label: 550 Music; Epic
- Songwriter: Carl Bell
- Producer: Steven Haigler

Fuel singles chronology
"Shimmer" (1998)	"Bittersweet" (1998)

Music video
- "Shimmer" on YouTube

"Shimmer" is a song by American alternative rock group Fuel. It was first released in May 1996 as part of their third EP, Porcelain, and was later re-recorded and released as the lead single from their debut album, Sunburn (1998), in February 1998. Written by Carl Bell, the single peaked at number two on the US Billboard Modern Rock Tracks chart, number 11 on the Billboard Mainstream Rock Tracks chart, and number 42 on the Billboard Hot 100. According to Billboard, "Shimmer" was the fourth-most-played song on alternative radio stations in the United States in 1998.

== Content ==
Guitarist Carl Bell told a crowd on VH1 Storytellers that the song was inspired by an ex-girlfriend he had shortly dated after high school, who left him for another man she ended up marrying. A few years later, she called Bell, confiding her relationship woes in him, and he felt a range of emotions from hurting to helplessness that inspired the lyrics of "Shimmer".

== Critical reception ==
Dan Snierson of Entertainment Weekly cited "Shimmer" as one of the "mellowest cuts" from its parent album, commenting that the song is a "Dave Matthews-ish ditty". Billboard wrote that "the best thing about 'Shimmer' is that it doesn't wallow in angst melodrama or reek of kiddie-pop sugar," and called it "vibrant, aggressive rock' n'roll for adults."

== Music video ==
The music video has the band performing the song (mostly centered on singer Brett Scallions) and has short flashes to things like a mother and infant child and a dog. Directed by Josh Taft, the film clip's theme of the past and the present draws quite heavily from the song's lyrics of a shimmering love that while starting off mesmerizing can and will eventually fade and be torn away through emotional distance and neglect. The visions concentrate on the position of a past potential family in the storyteller's life as wholesome visions of a woman post-pregnancy in a white dress, a faceless father holding a baby, a goldfish and a family dog come into focus but are rarely seen clearly as the camera blurs and we are drawn quickly away. As the lyrics grind on describing the prior engagements with the female antagonist Taft brings us quite suddenly to the realization that the goldfish is dead, the family dog blurs away and the baby ceases to move and recedes to a cold blackened shape. The arrival of a female antagonist with symbolic sands of time falling through her outstretched hands heralds the arrival of new life as the song reaches its climax. The protagonist's car ride slowly but surely drifts him along and possibly away from the dead home-life but the goldfish now risen is rejoined by a now clearer vision of the family dog and the squirming life of the baby in a man's arms returns. The director has hinted at an emotionally empty space; a dead home through his lack of furnishings, drained color and detached objectivity but seems to suggest that the storyteller singer becomes the one framed in the past while the others live on as suggested in the closing scene.

== Track listings and formats ==
- US CD single
1. "Shimmer" – 3:34
2. "Walk the Sky" – 3:19
3. "Sunday Girl" – 3:41
- European maxi-CD single
1. "Shimmer" – 3:34
2. "Shimmer" (Acoustic Version) – 3:19
3. "Walk the Sky" – 3:19
4. "Sunday Girl" – 3:41

- Australian CD single
1. "Shimmer" – 3:34
2. "Shimmer" (Acoustic Version) – 3:19
3. "Sunday Girl" – 3:41
4. "Walk the Sky" – 3:19
- US 7-inch vinyl
1. "Shimmer" – 3:34
2. "Sunday Girl" – 3:41

== Personnel ==
Personnel are adapted from the "Shimmer" CD single liner notes.

- Brett Scallions – lead vocals, guitar
- Carl Bell – guitar, vocals
- Jeff Abercrombie – bass guitar
- Kevin Miller – drums
- Steven Haigler – engineer, producer
- Tom Lord-Alge – mixing
- Jonathan Mover – drums, percussion
- Jane Scarpantoni – cello

== Charts ==
=== Weekly charts ===
Weekly chart performance for "Shimmer"
Chart (1998–1999)	Peak position
Australia (ARIA) with "Sunburn"	16
US Billboard Hot 100	42
US Adult Pop Airplay (Billboard)	37
US Alternative Airplay (Billboard)	2
US Mainstream Rock (Billboard)	11
US CHR/Pop Top 50 (Radio & Records)	43

=== Year-end charts ===
Year-end chart performance for "Shimmer"
Chart (1998)	Position
US Mainstream Rock Tracks (Billboard)	26
US Modern Rock Tracks (Billboard)	4

== Certifications and sales ==
Certifications and sales for "Shimmer"
Region	Certification	Certified units/sales
Australia (ARIA)	Platinum	70,000^{^}
New Zealand (RMNZ)	Platinum	30,000^{‡}
^{^} Shipments figures based on certification alone.^{‡} Sales+streaming figures based on certification alone.

== Release history ==
Release dates and formats for "Shimmer"
Region	Date	Format(s)	Label(s)	Ref.
United States	February 23, 1998	Modern rock radio	550 Music; Epic	
United States	July 14, 1998	Contemporary hit radio	550 Music; Epic	

== Cover versions ==
In 2005, the South African acoustic rock project Sheen (later rebranded as Insolent Noize) released a cover version of "Shimmer" that achieved commercial success. The track crossed over into contemporary hit radio, peaking at No. 29 on the national 5FM Top 40 chart in late 2005.
