= Natural Selection (Fuel album) =

Studio album by Fuel
- Released: September 23, 2003
- Recorded: April 2002–July 2003 in Atlanta
- Genre: Post-grunge
- Length: 50:39
- Label: Epic
- Producers: Michael Beinhorn; Carl Bell

Fuel chronology
| Something Like Human (2000) | Natural Selection (2003) | The Best of Fuel (2005) |

Singles from Natural Selection
- 1. "Won’t Back Down" Released: January 14, 2003; 2. "Falls on Me" Released: July 22, 2003; 3. "Million Miles" Released: December 16, 2003

Natural Selection is the third album by American rock band Fuel, released on September 23, 2003, by Epic Records.

Preceding the album's release "Won't Back Down" was featured as the lead single of the film soundtrack Daredevil: The Album. "Falls on Me" served as the second single of Natural Selection and received much airplay on MTV throughout the summer. The album also had a third marginally successful single in "Million Miles". The song "Quarter" was featured in the video games Need for Speed: Underground, NFL Street, and NASCAR Thunder 2004.

== Background ==
Following the multi-platinum success of their previous album Something Like Human, Fuel had some setbacks to overcome before they could begin recording the album that became Natural Selection. First off, the band had to resolve some pressing legal matters which prohibited them from recording.

Medical problems also inhibited the recording of the album. In 1998, singer Brett Scallions collided on stage with guitarist–songwriter Carl Bell during the band's Sunburn tour. This left Scallions with a deviated septum that required medical attention. Scallions relearned how to sing after losing his voice during the surgery: "I think I basically had to relearn how to sing... I had to recondition myself and figure out how to sing again."

Bell expressed confidence in Natural Selection, stating "The record is, I think, far and beyond any of the other records we've had as a body of work." Producer Michael Beinhorn has stated that Natural Selection is one of his favorite albums that he's produced.

== Reception ==
Professional ratings
Review scores
| Source | Rating |
|---|---|
| Allmusic | 3/5 stars |
| Rolling Stone | 2/5 stars |

Natural Selection debuted at No. 15 on the Billboard 200 album chart, selling 71,990 copies in its first week of release. In its second week, the album sold a further 29,716 copies, bringing its total sales after two weeks to 101,706 copies. The album was later nominated for a Grammy Award in 2004 for Best Engineered Album, Non-Classical. By January 30, 2004, Natural Selection had sold more than 280,000 copies in the United States, according to Nielsen SoundScan. By the end of February 2004, Natural Selection had sold over 300,000 units in the United States. By late 2004, the album had shipped approximately 500,000 units to retailers in the United States. Despite reaching the threshold for Gold certification, it was never officially certified by the RIAA, apparently because the label did not submit the album for certification.

== Aftermath ==
In August 2004, Kevin Miller was dismissed from the band, after which he filed a lawsuit against his former bandmates. The suit, directed at Fuel Touring Inc., Fuel Publishing Inc., and Fuel Recording Inc., alleged that he had been denied financial entitlements from touring and recording revenues. According to Miller, there was an oral agreement within the band that each member would receive 25 percent of the profits from touring and from their recording contract with Sony, as well as 6.5 percent of publishing royalties. He claimed to have received only $212,000 from a $3 million advance for the album Natural Selection, on the grounds that the contract with Sony had supposedly been signed before he officially joined the band. Additionally, he said he was not paid for his final tour with the group, with the band arguing that it had not generated any profit.

Following his departure, both Miller and his former bandmates publicly commented on the situation. While Brett Scallions described the dismissal as a difficult but necessary decision and refrained from discussing the details, Miller criticized guitarist and primary songwriter Carl Bell for being overly controlling—particularly during the making of Natural Selection. He expressed frustration over his lack of creative input and described the internal atmosphere of the band as increasingly tense. He also claimed that lead singer Brett Scallions had struggled with vocal issues and had resorted to lip-syncing during the last two tours, a decision Miller openly disagreed with.

In later interviews, Miller stated that he held no personal grudges against his former bandmates. Rather, he expressed relief at being able to make music again with his new band, Fosterchild. He appreciated the opportunity to contribute creatively, something he said was never possible during his years with Fuel. Shortly after Miller's departure, lead singer Brett Scallions also left the band, reportedly for similar reasons.

In February 2006, Brett Scallions publicly announced his departure from the band. In his statement, he emphasized that the decision had not come lightly and had been growing in him since the end of the Something Like Human tour. Contrary to speculation, his departure was not due to health issues or his involvement in his new band The X’s, but rather stemmed from artistic dissatisfaction. Scallions criticized that Fuel had never truly been a collaborative band, and that he, as a musician and songwriter, had little say in the creative process. This lack of input eventually drained his passion for working with the band.

Despite the split, Scallions stressed his close personal bond with his former bandmates Carl Bell, Jeff Abercrombie, and Kevin Miller, wishing them all the best with Fuel moving forward. He expressed gratitude for the experiences he had shared with the band and for the support from fans, which had allowed him to live out his dream as a musician.

Following Scallions’ departure, the band underwent significant changes. Even shortly before he left, drummer Kevin Miller had already been dismissed. Carl Bell, guitarist and primary songwriter, now faced the challenge of replacing two key members.

In the wake of Brett Scallions’ exit, Carl Bell made public comments about the circumstances that led to it. In interviews, he stated that Scallions’ voice had “stopped working” during the Natural Selection recording sessions, implying that this vocal decline was a key reason behind growing tensions in the band. Bell portrayed Scallions’ departure as a necessary step, partly driven by vocal health concerns.

These remarks later drew a strong response from Scallions himself. In an interview with AntiMusic, he firmly contradicted Bell’s version of events. According to Scallions, his voice was never the issue. What truly wore him down was being creatively shut out of the band’s writing process. Particularly during the making of Natural Selection, he said, the band no longer functioned as a team: Bell wrote nearly all the material by himself, while the rest of the band increasingly felt excluded. Scallions described this period as deeply frustrating, leading him into a personal crisis. He battled depression, alcohol, and drug problems, which ultimately convinced him to walk away from the band in order to save himself.

Despite these internal conflicts, Scallions continued to pursue music. He played bass with the rock band Circus Diablo, touring with them on Ozzfest, and was involved in planning a new album with the group. He also took over vocal duties in Riders on the Storm, a project led by former The Doors members Ray Manzarek and Robby Krieger. Scallions spoke with great reverence about performing alongside these rock legends.

Though the split from Fuel had been painful, Scallions looked back on his years with the band with pride and appreciation. At the same time, he underlined the importance of making music in a creative and inspiring environment. With new projects on the horizon such as a collaboration with drummer Jonathan Mover, he returned to his musical career.

== Track listing ==
All songs written by Carl Bell, except where noted.

| No. | Title | Writer(s) | Length |
|---|---|---|---|
| 1. | "Quarter" | | 3:39 |
| 2. | "Down Inside of You" | | 4:07 |
| 3. | "Million Miles" | | 3:51 |
| 4. | "Falls on Me" | | 4:13 |
| 5. | "These Things" | | 4:57 |
| 6. | "Won't Back Down" | | 3:23 |
| 7. | "Running Away" | | 4:54 |
| 8. | "Most of All" | | 4:13 |
| 9. | "Getting Thru?" | | 4:09 |
| 10. | "Die Like This" | | 4:29 |
| 11. | "Luck" | Brett Scallions | 4:15 |
| 12. | "Days with You" | | 4:29 |
| Total length: | | | 50:39 |

== Personnel ==
Band

- Brett Scallions – lead vocals, rhythm guitar
- Carl Bell – lead guitar, keyboards, backing vocals
- Jeff Abercrombie – bass
- Kevin Miller – drums

Production

- Michael Beinhorn – producer
- Andy Wallace – mixing
- Josh Wilbur – mixing on "Won't Back Down (Bring You Hell Remix)"
- Howie Weinberg – mastering

== Charts ==
Chart performance
| Chart (2003) | Peak position |
|---|---|
| Australian Albums (ARIA) | 64 |
| Canadian Albums (Nielsen SoundScan) | 65 |
| US Billboard 200 | 15 |
