= Sunburn (Fuel album) =

Studio album by Fuel
- Released: March 31, 1998
- Recorded: 1997–1998
- Studios: Long View Farm (North Brookfield, Massachusetts)
- Genre: Post-grunge
- Length: 41:55
- Labels: 550; Epic
- Producer: Steve Haigler

Fuel chronology
Hazleton (1997)	Sunburn (1998)	Something Like Human (2000)

Alternative cover
- Expanded edition album artwork

Singles from Sunburn
- 1. "Shimmer" Released: August 25, 1998; 2. "Bittersweet" Released: November 5, 1998; 3. "Jesus or a Gun" Released: April 20, 1999; 4. "Sunburn" Released: May 7, 1999

Professional ratings
Review scores
Source	Rating
AllMusic	3/5 stars
Entertainment Weekly	B+
Miami New Times	(favorable)
The Rolling Stone Album Guide	3/5 stars

Sunburn is the debut studio album by American rock band Fuel, released by 550 Music, an imprint of Epic Records on March 31, 1998. It was produced by Steven Haigler. The songs "Shimmer", "Jesus or a Gun", and "Bittersweet" were issued as commercial singles following its release; the former peaked at number 42 on the Billboard Hot 100. Critically, the album was met with average reviews, and commercially, the album modestly entered the Billboard 200 at number 77. By June 13, 1998, Sunburn had sold 97,000 copies. Sunburn received platinum certification by the Recording Industry Association of America (RIAA)—signifying sales of one million units—on May 24, 2000. By September 1999, the album had sold 643,000 copies in the United States. By September 2000, US sales had reached 760,000 copies.

In 2025, Lauryn Schaffner of Loudwire named the album the best post-grunge release of 1998.

== Track listing ==
All songs written by Carl Bell. (Note: The Sunburn liner notes state Bell as sole writer of all the songs on the album, though BMI publishing lists Bell and Brett Scallions as writers of "Jesus or a Gun" and "Ozone".)

Sunburn track listing
No.	Title	Length
1.	"Untitled"	3:58
2.	"Bittersweet"	3:51
3.	"Shimmer"	3:33
4.	"Jesus or a Gun"	3:58
5.	"Sunburn"	4:23
6.	"New Thing"	3:19
7.	"It's Come to This"	3:39
8.	"Song for You"	3:46
9.	"Mary Pretends"	3:36
10.	"Ozone"	3:49
11.	"Hideaway"	4:03

Reissue version
No.	Title	Length
12.	"King for a Day"	3:42
13.	"Walk the Sky"	3:18

- The "special expanded edition" re-issue of the album including two bonus tracks was released on September 23, 2003. "Walk the Sky" was initially recorded in 1998 with producer Brendan O'Brien for the Godzilla soundtrack.

== Personnel ==
Fuel

- Brett Scallions – lead vocals, rhythm guitar
- Carl Bell – lead guitar, backing vocals
- Jeff Abercrombie – bass
- Kevin Miller – drums (credited but does not perform on album)
- Jonathan Mover – drums (on album)
- Jane Scarpantoni – cello on “Shimmer” and “It Comes to This”

Production

- Steven Haigler – producer
- Brendan O'Brien – producer on "Walk the Sky"
- Tom Lord-Alge – mixing
- Ted Jensen – mastering

== Charts ==
=== Weekly charts ===
Weekly chart performance for Sunburn
Chart (1998–1999)	Peak position
Australian Albums (ARIA)	16
New Zealand Albums (RMNZ)	17
US Billboard 200	77
US Heatseekers Albums (Billboard)	1

=== Year-end charts ===
Year-end chart performance for Sunburn
Chart (1999)	Position
Australian Albums (ARIA)	82

== Certifications ==
Certifications for Sunburn
Region	Certification	Certified units/sales
Australia (ARIA)	Gold	35,000^{^}
United States (RIAA)	Platinum	1,000,000^{^}
^{^} Shipments figures based on certification alone.
