= Brett Scallions =

American rock singer (born 1971)

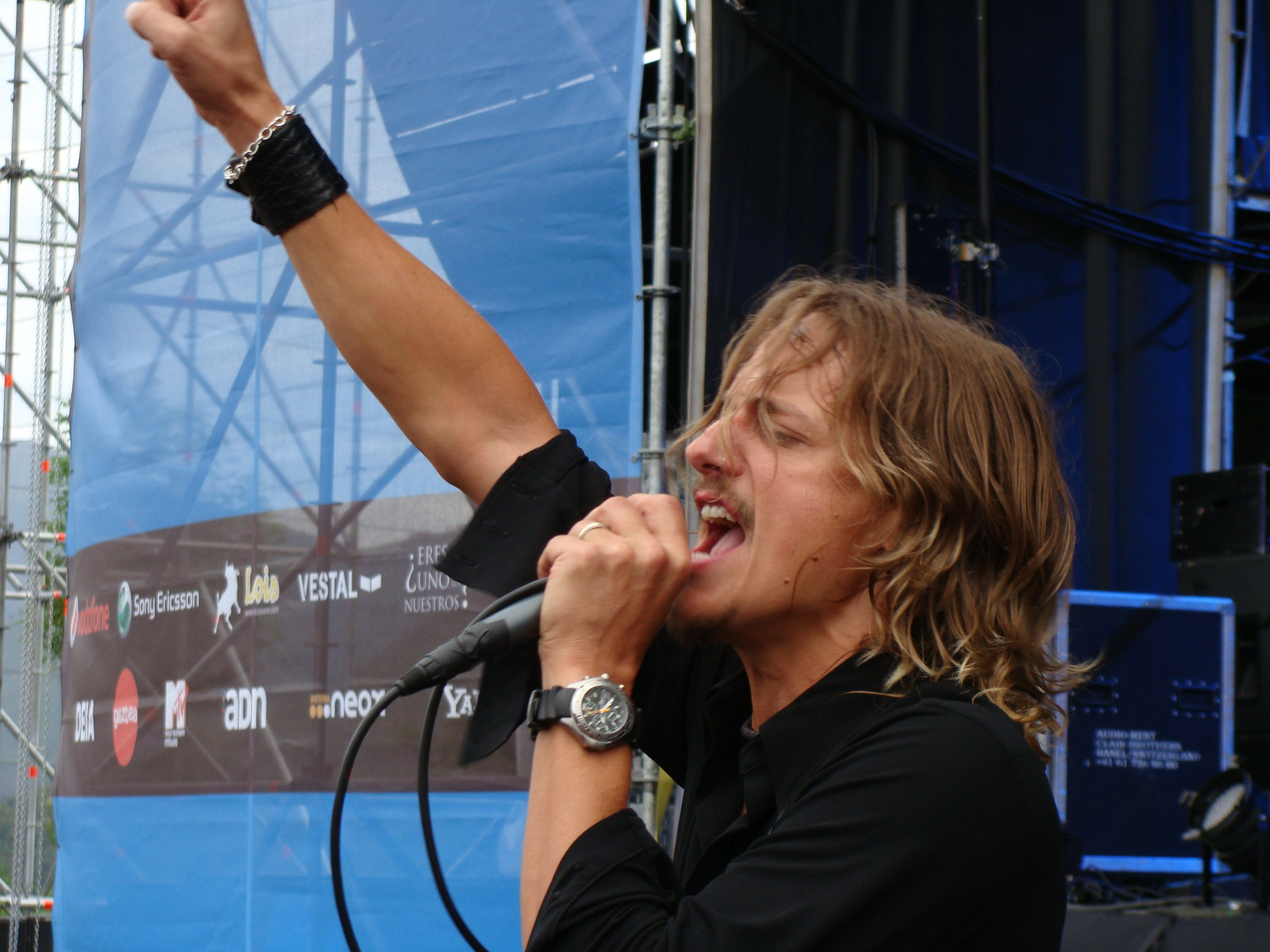
- Scallions performing with Riders on the Storm in 2008

Background information
- Born: Brett Allen Scallions; December 21, 1971 (age 54)
- Origin: Brownsville, Tennessee, U.S.
- Genres: Alternative rock; post-grunge; hard rock; blues; country
- Occupations: Singer; songwriter; musician
- Instruments: Vocals; guitar; bass; drums; percussion
- Years active: 1989–present
- Labels: MegaForce; Epic; Golden Robot
- Formerly of: Fuel; The X's; Circus Diablo; Riders on the Storm; World Fire Brigade; Re-Fueled
- Spouse: Abby Gennet (m. 2005)
- Children: 2
- Website: brettscallions.com

Brett Allen Scallions (born December 21, 1971) is an American singer, songwriter, and musician. He is best known for being one of the founding members and the original lead vocalist, rhythm guitarist, and a songwriter for the alternative rock band Fuel, from 1993 to 2006 and again from 2010 to 2020. He sang on the band's biggest singles, including "Shimmer", "Hemorrhage (In My Hands)", and "Bad Day".

== Early life ==
Brett Scallions was born in Brownsville, Tennessee. As a child, he listened to Elvis Presley records and sang in a church choir. He was cast as a lead actor in plays throughout high school, and he received scholarships to Lambuth University for music and theater.

== Career ==
=== Fuel (1993–2006) ===
Scallions joined Fuel in 1993, after bassist Jeff Abercrombie saw him perform in a bar in Jackson, Tennessee. He recorded three albums with the band, before departing in 2006: Sunburn (1998), Something Like Human (2000), and Natural Selection (2003). Fuel achieved its greatest success with Scallions as lead singer, with such singles as "Shimmer", "Hemorrhage (In My Hands)", and "Bad Day". In 2002, Scallions underwent surgery for a deviated septum and reportedly had to relearn how to sing entirely.

=== Post-Fuel projects (2006–2010) ===
The X's, Circus Diablo

In 2006, Scallions formed the group the X's with Chris Goerke, John Law, and Mike Maenza. They released a self-titled album the same year. From 2006 to 2007, he played bass in the band Circus Diablo, performing on their self-titled debut album.

Riders on the Storm

In 2007, Scallions became the lead singer of Riders on the Storm, a project led by former members of the Doors Robby Krieger and Ray Manzarek.

World Fire Brigade

In 2009, Scallions formed the band World Fire Brigade with Smile Empty Soul vocalist and guitarist Sean Danielsen and keyboardist and producer Eddie Wohl. They released the album Spreading My Wings in 2012.

Re-Fueled

In 2009, Scallions toured with former Fuel bassist Jeff Abercrombie, guitarist Yogi Lonich (Buckcherry, the Wallflowers), and drummer Ken Schalk (Candiria), under the name Re-Fueled, playing Fuel songs.

"Something to Believe"

In 2010, Scallions contributed vocals to the charity single "Something to Believe" by the band Hollow.

=== Return to Fuel and second departure (2010–2020) ===
In 2010, Carl Bell left Fuel, and Scallions reformed the group with Lonich, Schalk, and former Shinedown bassist Brad Stewart. The band released Puppet Strings in 2014, their first album with Scallions back on vocals. In 2020, Scallions left Fuel once more.

=== Post-Fuel projects (2020–present) ===
RadioBot

In 2023, Scallions formed the group RadioBot with Eddie Wohl and Billy Harvey. They released the singles "Subterranean Homesick Blues" and "This World's on Fire" the same year.

World Fire Brigade

In 2024, World Fire Brigade released the single "Shot Down Again".

== Personal life ==
Scallions is married to Abby Gennet, guitarist and lead singer of the band Slunt. They have two sons together, born in 2007 and 2010.
