= Fuel (band) =

American rock band

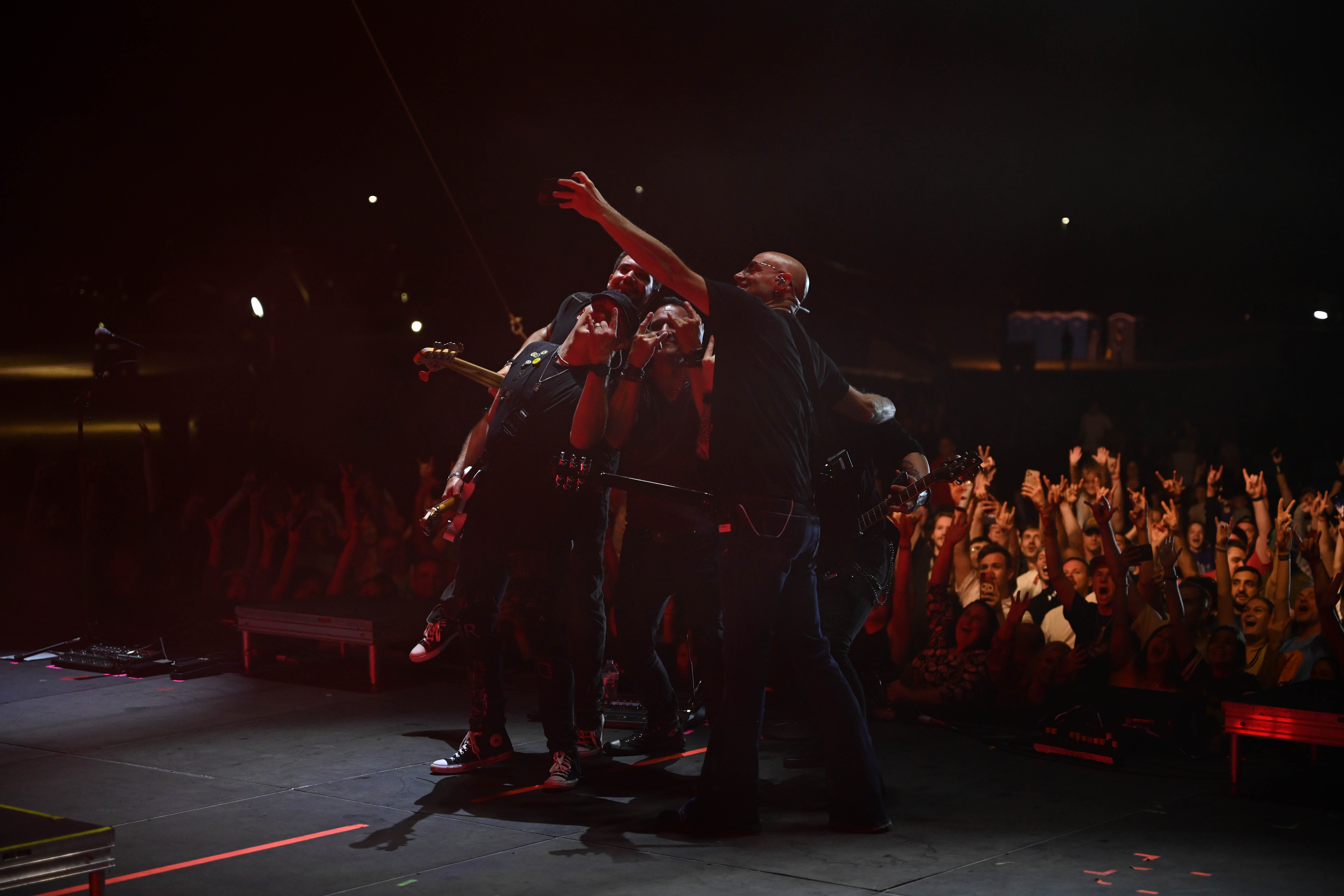
- Fuel performing in 2023

Background information
- Also known as: Reel Too Real; Small the Joy; Re-Fueled
- Origin: Harrisburg, Pennsylvania, U.S.
- Genres: Post-grunge; hard rock; alternative rock; alternative metal
- Years active: 1993–present
- Labels: Megaforce; Sony BMG; Epic
- Members: Carl Bell; Kevin Miller; Mark Klotz; Tommy Nat; Aaron Scott
- Past members: Jeff Abercrombie; Jody Abbott; Brett Scallions; Erik Avakian; Toryn Green; Tommy Stewart; Ken Schalk; Bryan Keeling; Brad Stewart; Andy Andersson; Shannon Boone; Phil Buckman; Jason Womack; John Corsale
- Website: fuel-official.com

Fuel is an American rock band from Harrisburg, Pennsylvania, formed in 1993 by guitarist-songwriter Carl Bell, vocalist Brett Scallions, drummer Jody Abbott, keyboardist Erik Avakian, and bassist Jeff Abercrombie. After several independent releases, the band signed with 550 Music and Epic Records to release their debut studio album, Sunburn (1998), which was supported by their first hit single, "Shimmer". The song peaked at number 42 on the Billboard Hot 100, while their 2000 single, "Hemorrhage (In My Hands)", peaked at number 30. The latter, along with the moderate hit "Bad Day", appeared on the band's second album, Something Like Human. Fuel's third album, Natural Selection (2003), was met with moderate success and is their last to feature Bell and Scallions together.

The band has since undergone several lineup changes. In 2010, Bell leased the Fuel name to Scallions, who had left in 2006. Scallions subsequently reformed the band with a new lineup and released the album Puppet Strings in 2014. In 2020, Fuel's naming rights reverted back to Bell, who formed a new group that featured original drummer Kevin Miller. Bell and Miller's attempts to reunite with Scallions proved unsuccessful, with Scallions claiming he would never again perform under the Fuel name.

Fuel saw considerable commercial success in the late 1990s and early 2000s. Sunburn was certified platinum by the Recording Industry Association of America, while Something Like Human has been certified double-platinum. The band has had multiple music videos in frequent rotation on MTV, performed on numerous live networks in the US, Canada, and Australia, and recorded songs for film soundtracks such as Scream 3, Daredevil, Godzilla, and A Walk to Remember. In 2013, "Hemorrhage (In My Hands)" was named the number 6 Alternative Rock song of the past 25 years, according to Billboard's Alternative Chart 25th Anniversary: Top 100 Songs.

== History ==
=== Early years (1989–1998) ===
What would eventually become Fuel was formed in 1989 in the western Tennessee town of Kenton, when Carl Bell and Jeff Abercrombie began playing music together in junior high school, getting involved in various garage bands. In college, Bell met drummer Jody Abbott, and they formed the band Wanted. After college, Bell and Abercrombie formed Reel Too Real with Abbott, playing cover songs at local clubs in Tennessee. Abercrombie saw vocalist-guitarist Brett Scallions performing in a bar in Jackson, Tennessee, in 1992, and recruited him to join the band a year later.

With the addition of keyboardist Erik Avakian, the first proper iteration of the band came together. In 1993, they moved to Harrisburg, Pennsylvania, where they performed cover songs at local bars and nightclubs as Reel Too Real. When playing original material, they were known as Small the Joy, under which name they released a self-titled EP in 1994. At this point, they once more changed their name, this time to Fuel, and self-released a second EP, Porcelain, in 1996. They also repackaged their first EP as Small the Joy, under the name Fuel. Porcelain spawned a small local radio hit with the track "Shimmer" and brought the band to the attention of Sony's 550 imprint, which released their third EP, Hazleton, in 1998.

=== Sunburn and Something like Human (1998–2001) ===
Upon signing to Epic, Fuel entered Long View Farm Studios in Massachusetts, along with producer Steven Haigler and session drummer Jonathan Mover; Abbott had been ousted prior to recording. The band's full-length debut, Sunburn, came out in 1998. A re-recorded version of "Shimmer" was included and peaked at No. 2 on the Billboard Modern Rock Tracks charts, No. 11 on the Mainstream Rock Tracks chart, No. 37 on the Adult Top 40 chart, and at No. 42 on the Billboard Hot 100, while the other singles ("Bittersweet", "Jesus or a Gun", and "Sunburn") received some airplay. Guitarist and songwriter Carl Bell said in a 2018 interview that the record company wanted to push "Shimmer" to top 40 radio, but the band fought them on this, mentioning that at the time, rock bands were worried about protecting their image. "Shimmer" and "Sunburn" were featured on the charity album Live in the X Lounge. "Sunburn" also appeared in the movie Scream 3, and the band contributed the non-album track "Walk the Sky" to the 1998 film Godzilla. Fuel then toured in support of the release with new drummer Kevin Miller. Sunburn was eventually certified Gold and then Platinum by the RIAA.

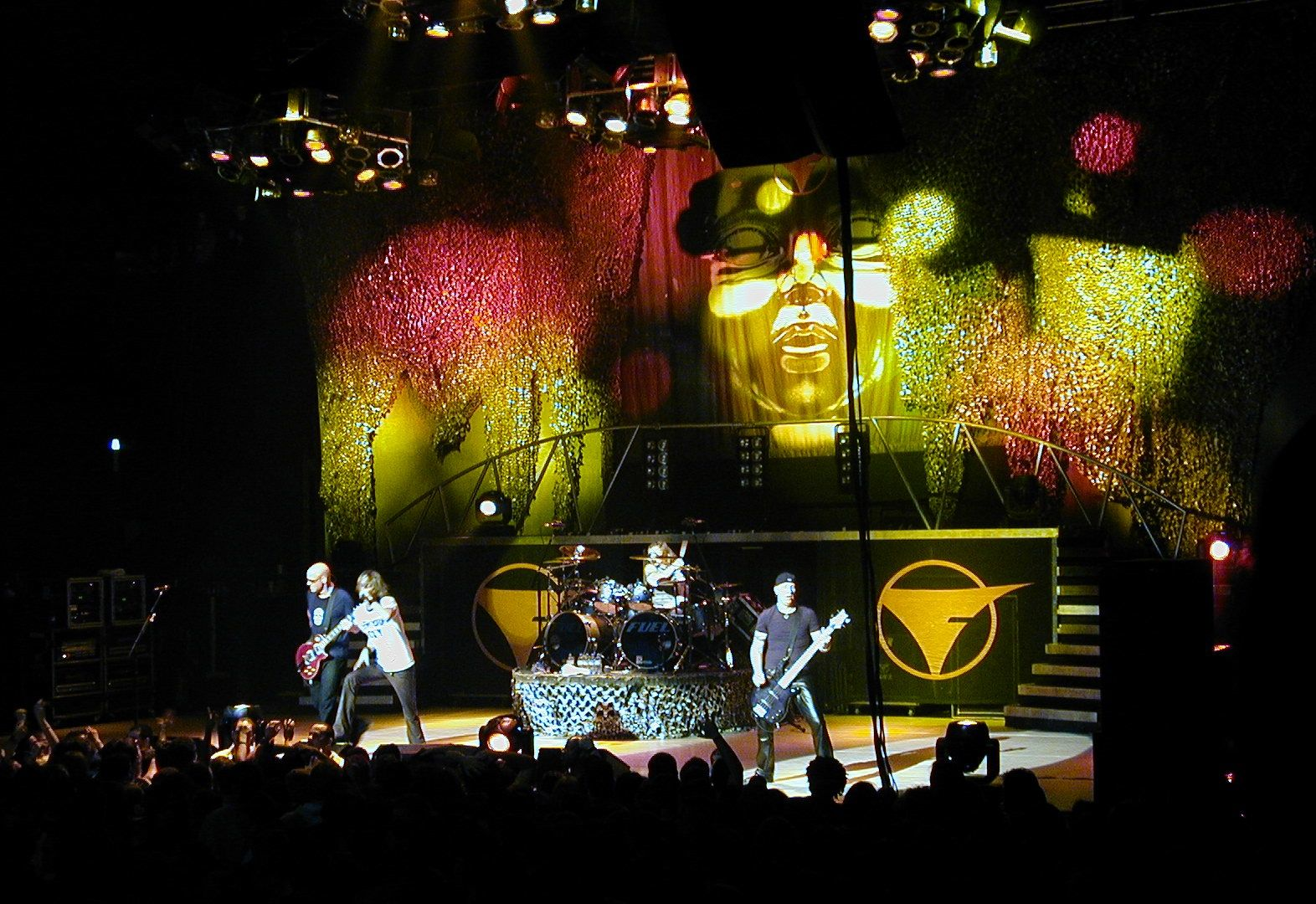
Fuel performing in 2001

In 2000, Fuel returned with their second album, Something Like Human, featuring the single "Hemorrhage (In My Hands)", which was No. 1 for 12 weeks on the U.S. Modern Rock Tracks chart. The single was also named Billboard's No. 5 Rock Song of the Decade, according to their Best of the 2000s Rock Songs chart. In 2013, "Hemorrhage (In My Hands)" became the No. 6 Alternative Rock song of the past 25 years, according to Billboard's Alternative Chart 25th Anniversary: Top 100 Songs. Something Like Human peaked at No. 17 on the Billboard 200 and was certified Double Platinum by the RIAA in September 2001.

=== Natural Selection, lineup changes, and Angels & Devils (2002–2007) ===
In 2002, prior to the recording of Fuel's third studio album, Scallions underwent vocal cord surgery. He reportedly had to relearn how to sing entirely post-surgery, with drummer Kevin Miller later alleging that Scallions was lip syncing while on tour to compensate. The album, Natural Selection, was released in 2003. Its lead single, "Falls on Me", was the band's final song to chart on the Billboard Hot 100, peaking at number 52, as well as their last song to chart internationally. The album peaked at number 15 on the Billboard 200 and sold 71,000 copies in its first week.

Miller was dismissed from the band in 2004. In February 2006, Fuel announced that Scallions had left the band. Fuel had already laid the instrumental tracks for their fourth album, and they began auditioning new singers. Abercrombie and Bell took notice of American Idol contestant Chris Daughtry, after he performed "Hemorrhage (In My Hands)" on the show. The single reached the iTunes top 10 download list, remaining there a number of days and sparking interest in other Fuel songs, which began to appear on the iTunes Top 100 download chart. In March 2006, American Idol judge Randy Jackson stated in an interview that Daughtry had been offered the opportunity to become Fuel's new lead singer. Fuel confirmed their interest on their website as well as in interviews on Entertainment Tonight. In May, Abercrombie and Bell appeared on the TV show Extra to officially offer Daughtry the job. However, though "flattered", Daughtry turned down the offer and instead pursued a solo career. By this time, Tommy Stewart, formerly of Godsmack, was named on Fuel's Myspace page as their new drummer.

In June, the band announced they had found a new lead singer but were awaiting confirmation from the record label to announce who it was. They entered the studio in mid-August with producer Scott Humphrey to start recording their fourth album. Due to other commitments, Stewart was not available to play drums on the album, so Tommy Lee and Josh Freese filled his seat.

In March 2007, the band announced that their next record was fully mixed and going to mastering, and in April, they revealed that their new lead singer was Toryn Green. They disclosed the album's name—Angels & Devils—in May.

In June, the first single, "Wasted Time", was released, peaking at No. 24 on Billboard's Hot Mainstream Rock Tracks. The album followed in August. A second single, "Gone", was issued in October. Angels & Devils debuted on the Billboard 200 at No. 42, selling roughly 15,000 copies in its first week. In October 2008, Sony's catalog division Legacy Recordings released the compilation Playlist: The Very Best of Fuel on their Playlist series.

=== Carl Bell departure, Brett Scallions return, and Puppet Strings (2010–2020) ===
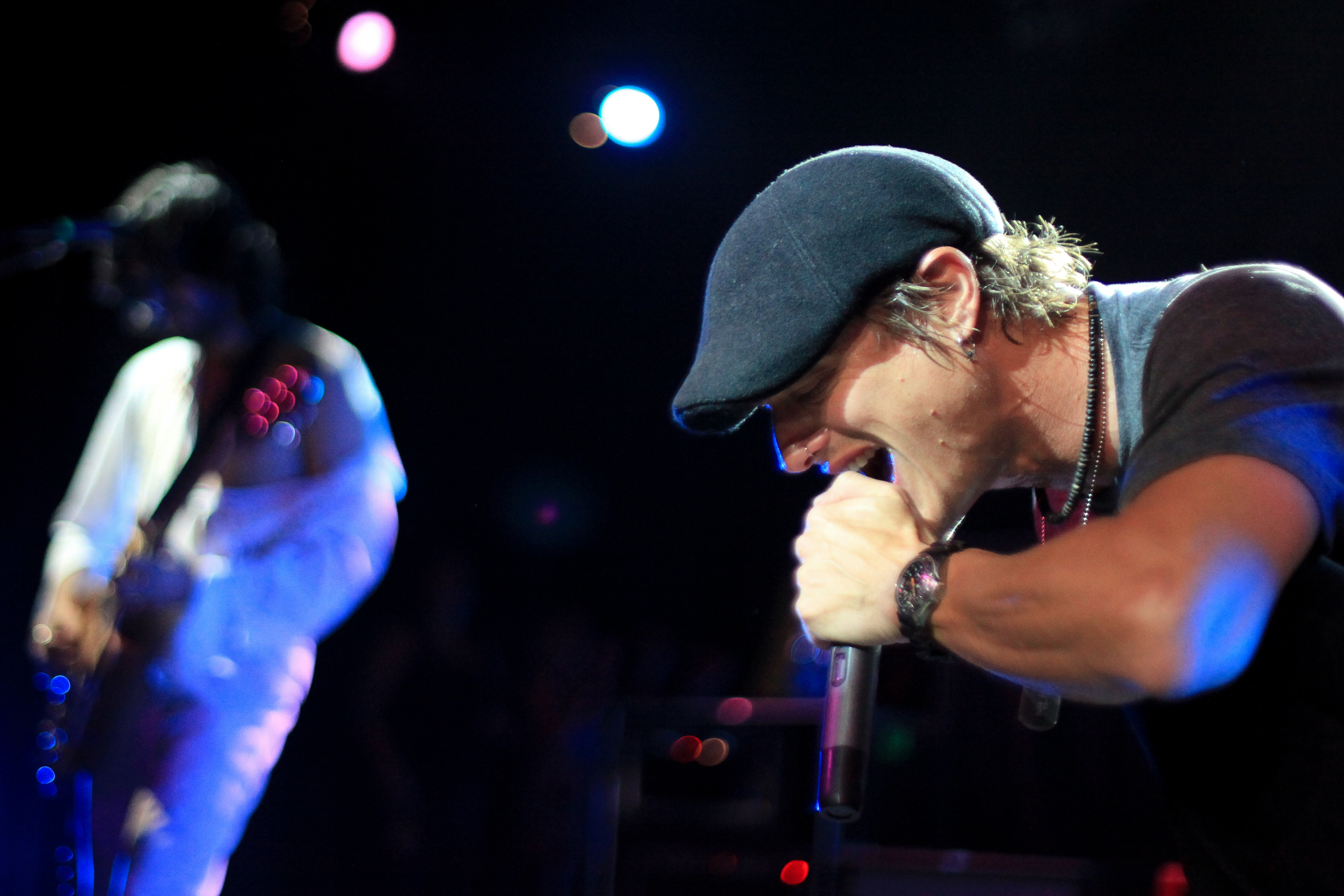
Fuel performing in 2010

In 2010, Bell quit the band and leased its name to Scallions, who subsequently reformed Fuel with a new lineup, stating in a press release:

The original lineup with Carl, Jeff, Jody, and myself will always be something special to all of us ... but it has been thirteen years since the original lineup was intact, and since then many great musicians have come and gone. The lineup I put together for Fuel is not meant to replace or diminish what any of the original members created. Just the opposite, it is to give our fans a live destination and to keep the Fuel name alive for a new generation to discover. Maybe someday we'll all get on the same page and play together again, but life happens, and the next thing you know you just can't jump on a bus and take off for a month, let alone a year."

The new lineup included former Shinedown guitarist Jasin Todd, who replaced Yogi Lonich. Todd left a year later and was replaced by Andy Andersson.

In 2012, Fuel entered the studio to record their fifth studio album, Puppet Strings, which was co-produced by Eddie Wohl and Scallions and mixed by Ben Grosse, who had collaborated with Fuel on Something Like Human. It was released in March 2014 and debuted at number one on the rock charts, an accomplishment the band had not seen since Something Like Human. The first single, "Soul to Preach To", came out in late January.

In May 2015, as Fuel geared up to join Everclear on their Summerland Tour, ex-Filter bass player Phil Buckman replaced Brad Stewart.

In October 2020, Scallions announced his departure from Fuel in a Facebook post:

"Hey, everyone. FYI, I AM NO LONGER IN FUEL! It seems there are quite a few people posting on the Fuel Facebook page that think it's me. I am part to blame for that as I have not officially posted regarding this until now. Well, it's official. I will no longer be performing nor will I be supporting the Fuel brand in any way. Unresolved differences have finally come to a point to where it's best to simply walk away never to return. I'd like to thank each and every fan and friend I have made throughout my time fronting the band. It's been quite the ride, but now it's time to move on to greener pastures. As many of you may know, I've been working on solo material for some time now and I must say it's coming out amazing. I can't wait to present to you this true labor of love. And once this whole pandemic is over, I plan to be touring and performing not only the new solo material, but also the songs I've made famous over the years as well as many favorites from other great artists. The light ahead is quite bright and I look forward to many more fun moments musically with you all. Hugs and love and I hope to see you from a stage in the very near future!"

=== Carl Bell return, Anomaly, and Pendulum (2020–present) ===
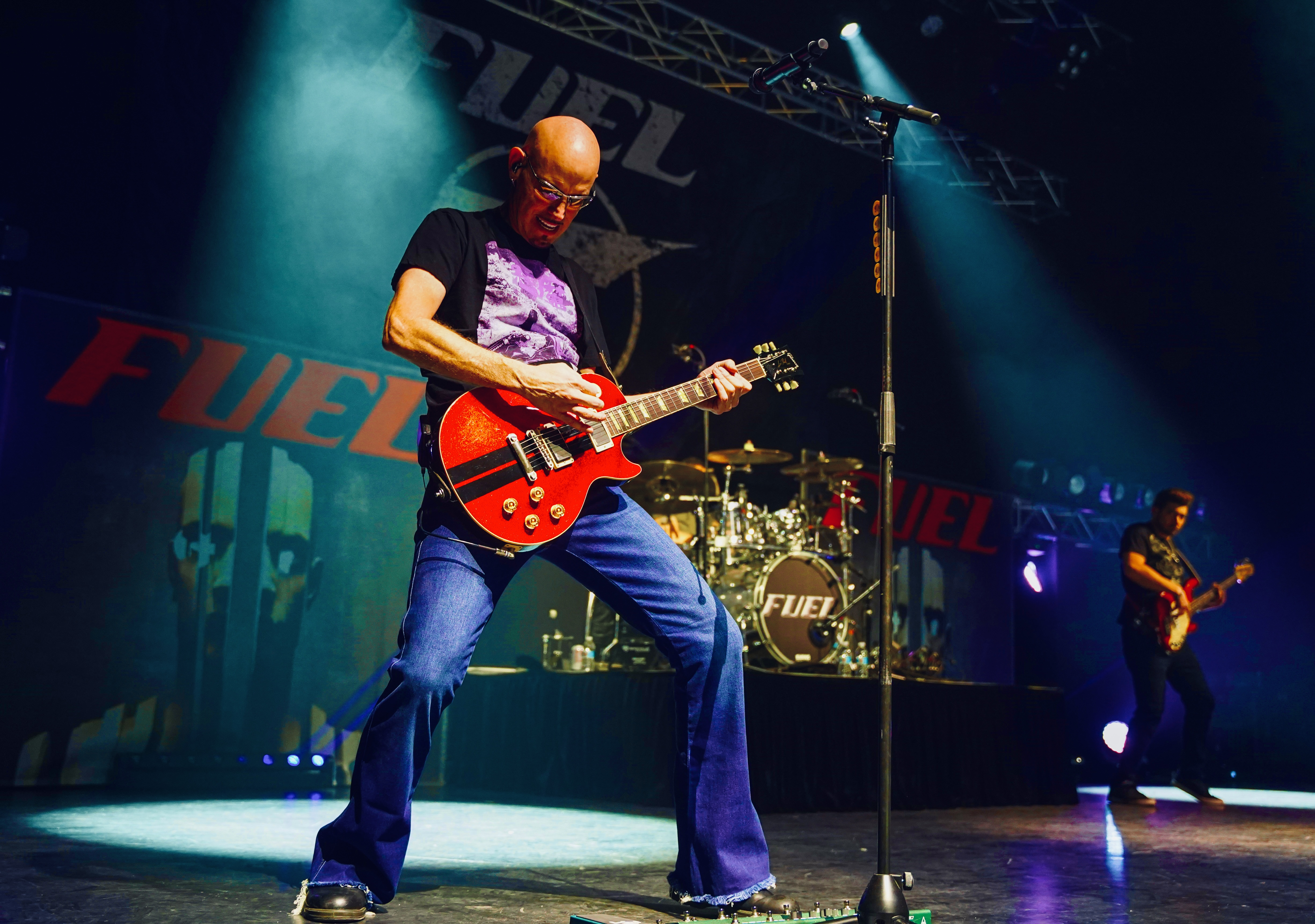
Carl Bell performing with Fuel in 2022

In 2020, founding member Carl Bell rejoined Fuel, forming a new version of the group. According to Bell, this was more or less a rebirth of Fuel and a new era for the band. Drummer Kevin Miller also returned, and they recruited vocalist John Corsale, who played in the band Smashed with Miller. They began working on what would become Fuel's sixth studio album, Anomaly, which came out in October 2021. Bell wrote and performed all instruments on the record, with Corsale on vocals. (Note: See Anomaly liner notes.) Bell also produced and mixed the album. The first single, "Hard", was released in July 2021. The second single, "Don't Say I", followed in August. In July 2022, the band's original drummer, Jody Abbott, died of Huntington's disease at age 55, after living with the disease for multiple years. In October, Corsale was removed from the band for undisclosed reasons. He was replaced by Aaron Scott, who had performed "Hemorrhage (In My Hands)" on The Voice. Their seventh studio album, Pendulum, was released on October 30, 2026.

== Awards and nominations ==
Award	Year	Nominee(s)	Category	Result	Ref.
BMI Pop Awards	2000	"Shimmer"	Award-Winning Song	Won	
BMI Pop Awards	2002	"Hemorrhage (In My Hands)"	Award-Winning Song	Won	
BDSCertified Spin Awards	2004	"Falls on Me"	100,000 Spins	Certified	
BMI Pop Awards	2005	"Falls on Me"	Most-Performed Song	Won	
BDSCertified Spin Awards	2006	"Hemorrhage (In My Hands)"	500,000 Spins	Certified	
BDSCertified Spin Awards	2007	"Falls on Me"	200,000 Spins	Certified	

== Band members ==
Current

- Carl Bell – lead guitar, backing vocals, occasional keyboards (1993–2010, 2020–present)
- Kevin Miller – drums (1998–2004, 2020–present)
- Mark Klotz – rhythm guitar, backing vocals (2020–present)
- Tommy Nat – bass, backing vocals (2020–present)
- Aaron Scott – lead vocals, rhythm guitar (2022–present)

Past

- Brett Scallions – lead vocals, rhythm guitar (1993–2006, 2010–2020)
- Jeff Abercrombie – bass (1993–2010)
- Jody Abbott – drums (1993–1998; died 2022)
- Erik Avakian – keyboards, backing vocals (1993–1996)
- Toryn Green – lead vocals (2006–2010)
- Tommy Stewart – drums (2004–2010)
- Ken Schalk – drums (2010–2013)
- Brad Stewart – bass (2010–2015)
- Andy Andersson – lead guitar, backing vocals (2011–2015)
- John Corsale – lead vocals, rhythm guitar (2020–2022)

Former touring musicians

- Ronny Paige – bass (2007–2008)
- Yogi Lonich – lead guitar, backing vocals (2010, 2011)
- Jasin Todd – lead guitar (2010–2011)
- Bryan Keeling – drums (2013; died 2025)
- Shannon Boone – drums (2013–2020)
- Phil Buckman – bass, backing vocals (2015–2020)
- Jason Womack – lead guitar, backing vocals (2015–2020)

Timeline

== Discography ==
Studio albums

- Sunburn (1998)
- Something Like Human (2000)
- Natural Selection (2003)
- Angels & Devils (2007)
- Puppet Strings (2014)
- Anomaly (2021)
- Pendulum (2026)
