= Carl Bell (musician) =

American musician and producer (born 1967)

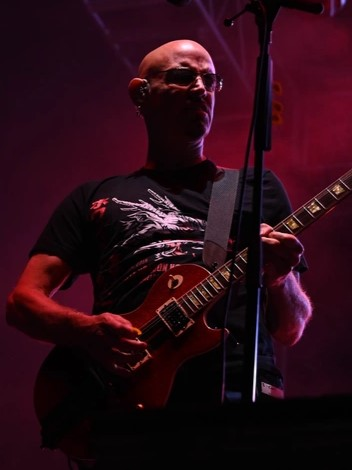
- Bell performing with Fuel in 2023

Background information
- Born: Carl William Bell; January 9, 1967 (age 59); Kenton, Tennessee, U.S.
- Genres: Hard rock; post-grunge; country
- Occupations: Musician; songwriter; record producer; singer
- Instruments: Guitar; vocals; keyboards
- Years active: 1989–present
- Labels: Sony BMG; Epic
- Member of: Fuel
- Website: carlbellmusic.com

Carl William Bell (born January 9, 1967) is an American musician, songwriter, and record producer. He founded the Pennsylvania-based hard rock band Fuel in 1993, for which he served as principal songwriter, lead guitarist, and producer until his departure in 2010, having written the band's biggest singles, including "Shimmer", "Hemorrhage (In My Hands)", and "Bad Day". In 2017, Bell released his debut solo album, the country-flavored Tennessee Fuel. In 2020, he rejoined Fuel under a new lineup.

== Career ==
=== Early days and Fuel (1989–2010) ===
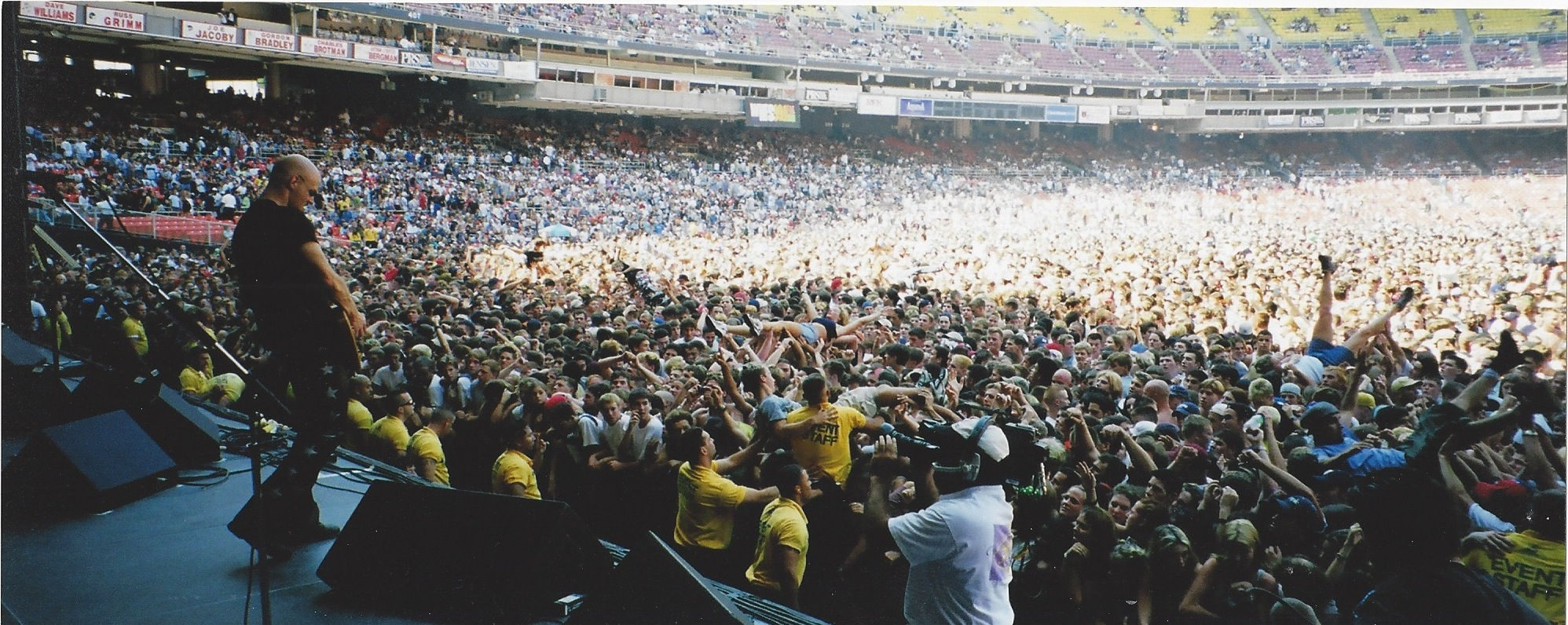
Bell performing with Fuel at HFStival in 2001

Carl Bell and Jeff Abercrombie began playing in various garage bands together while still in junior high school in 1989, in the western Tennessee town of Kenton. In college, Bell met drummer Jody Abbott, and they formed the band Wanted. After college, Bell and Abercrombie formed Reel Too Real with Abbott, playing cover songs at local clubs in Tennessee. Abercrombie later recruited vocalist-guitarist Brett Scallions, and in 1993, they formed Fuel. Bell was the band's primary songwriter, lead guitarist, and producer.

Fuel issued their debut album, Sunburn, in 1998, and followed it with Something Like Human in 2000. This album generated the band's biggest hit, "Hemorrhage (In My Hands)", which was the No. 1 Active Rock song for 12 weeks and the No. 5 Rock Song of the Decade, according to Billboard's Best of the 2000s Rock Songs Charts.

Fuel released Natural Selection in 2003 and Angels & Devils in 2007. In 2010, Bell departed the band to pursue other endeavors, after handing the rights to the Fuel name to vocalist Brett Scallions. He went on to work with various other artists and writers as well as on the production of TV and film soundtracks.

=== Songwriting ===
Bell wrote the song "Sister Mary" for Tommy Lee's 2005 solo album Tommyland: The Ride, and he also played guitar on the record. He has also written songs for other artists, including Jared Blake, Chris Daughtry, and Copper.

=== Solo album (2017) ===
In 2017, Bell issued his debut solo album, a country tribute to his father, titled Tennessee Fuel.

=== Return to Fuel and Anomaly (2020–present) ===
In 2020, Bell rejoined Fuel, along with former drummer Kevin Miller. They recruited vocalist John Corsale, guitarist Mark Klotz, and bassist Tommy Nat, and in 2021, the band issued the album Anomaly. In 2022, Corsale was removed from the band and replaced by Aaron Scott, who had performed "Hemorrhage (In My Hands)" on The Voice. In 2026, Fuel released their latest album, Pendulum.
