= Ill Niño discography =

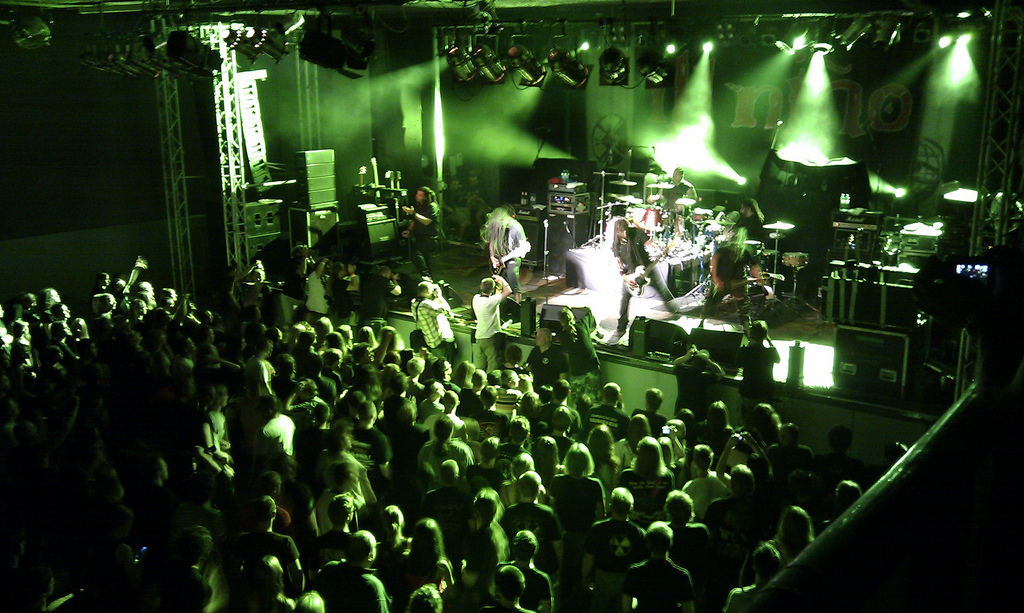
- Studio albums: 7
- EPs: 3
- Compilation albums: 1
- Singles: 19
- Video albums: 1

The discography of Latin-American heavy metal band Ill Niño consists of seven studio albums, one compilation album, one video album, three extended plays and nineteen singles. The band was founded in New Jersey sometime in 1998.

== Albums ==
=== Studio albums ===
List of studio albums, with selected chart positions
Title	Album details	Peak chart positions										Sales
Title	Album details	US	US Hard Rock	US Rock	AUS	FRA	GER	JPN	NLD	UK	UK Rock	Sales
Revolution Revolución	Released: September 18, 2001 (US); Label: Roadrunner; Formats: CD, CS, digital download	—	—	—	—	—	—	—	—	129	11	WW: 430,000
Confession	Released: September 30, 2003 (US); Label: Roadrunner; Formats: CD, CS, digital download	37	—	—	—	90	67	229	95	118	14	WW: 600,000+
One Nation Underground	Released: September 27, 2005 (US); Label: Roadrunner; Formats: CD, CS, digital download	101	—	—	88	119	88	137	—	—	—	
Enigma	Released: March 11, 2008 (US); Label: Cement Shoes; Formats: CD, digital download	145	21	—	—	—	67	202	—	—	—	WW: 80,000
Dead New World	Released: October 25, 2010 (US); Label: Victory; Formats: CD, digital download	164	13	46	—	—	—	—	—	—	—	
Epidemia	Released: October 22, 2012 (US); Label: Victory; Formats: CD, digital download	—	18	—	—	—	—	—	—	—	—	
Till Death, La Familia	Released: July 22, 2014 (US); Label: Victory; Formats: CD, digital download	143	18	49	—	—	—	—	—	—	—	

=== Compilation albums ===
List of compilation albums
Title	Album details
The Best of Ill Niño	Released: September 12, 2006 (US); Label: Roadrunner; Formats: CD, digital download

=== Video albums ===
List of video albums
Title	Album details
Live from the Eye of the Storm	Released: November 23, 2004 (US); Label: Roadrunner; Formats: DVD

=== Extended plays ===
List of extended plays
Title	Album details
El Niño	Released as "El Niño".; Released: 1998 (US); Formats: CDr
Ill Niño	Released: January 2000 (US); Label: C.I.A.; Formats: CD
The Under Cover Sessions	Released: November 7, 2006 (US); Label: Cement Shoes; Formats: CD, digital download

== Singles ==
List of singles, with selected chart positions, showing year released and album name
Title	Year	Peak chart positions			Album
Title	Year	US Main. Rock	UK	UK Rock	Album
"God Save Us"	2002	—	—	—	Revolution Revolución
"What Comes Around"	2002	28	81	7	Revolution Revolución
"Unreal"	2002	—	126	15	Revolution Revolución
"How Can I Live"	2003	26	—	—	Confession
"This Time's for Real"	2004	36	—	—	Confession
"Cleansing"	2005	—	—	—	Confession
"What You Deserve"	2005	33	—	—	One Nation Underground
"This Is War"	2006	—	—	—	One Nation Underground
"All I Ask For"	2006	—	—	—	One Nation Underground
"Arrastra"	2006	—	—	—	The Under Cover Sessions
"The Alibi of Tyrants"	2007	—	—	—	Enigma
"Me Gusta la Soledad"	2008	—	—	—	Enigma
"Against the Wall"	2010	—	—	—	Dead New World
"Bleed Like You"	2011	—	—	—	Dead New World
"The Depression"	2012	—	—	—	Epidemia
"La Epidemia" (featuring Frankie Palmeri)	2012	—	—	—	Epidemia
"Forgive Me Father"	2013	—	—	—	Epidemia
"Live Like There's No Tomorrow"	2014	—	—	—	Till Death, La Familia
"I'm Not the Enemy"	2014	—	—	—	Till Death, La Familia
"Blood Is Thicker Than Water"	2015	—	—	—	Till Death, La Familia
"Sangre"	2019	—	—	—	IllMortals Vol.II
"Mascara"	2020	—	—	—	IllMortals Vol.I
"All or Nothing"	2021	—	—	—	IllMortals Vol.I
"Si Una Vez"	2021	—	—	—	IllMortals Vol.II
"This Is Over"	2022	—	—	—	IllMortals Vol.II
"—" denotes a recording that did not chart or was not released in that territory.

== Other appearances ==
List of other appearances, showing year released and album name
Song	Year	Album	Comments
"Feliz Navidad"	1998	—N/a	Collaboration with the Step Kings, recorded for WSOU.
"El Niño"	1999	Métalo	Previously released as El Niño on the self-titled EP in 1998.
"Five Minutes Alone"	2000	Panther: A Tribute To Pantera	—
"Disposal (Demo)"	2000	Music With Attitude (Volume 20)	—
"Nothing's Clear (Demo)"	2000	Incoming: The Sounds Of 2001	—
"I Believe"	2001	New York's Hardest Volume 3	Previously released as El Niño on the self-titled EP in 1998.
"Buscondo"	2001	New York's Hardest Volume 3	Previously released as El Niño on the self-titled EP in 1998.
