= The Best of Ill Niño =

Greatest hits album by Ill Niño
- Released: September 12, 2006
- Recorded: 2001–2005
- Genres: Nu metal, alternative metal, Latin metal
- Length: 45:03
- Label: Roadrunner
- Producers: St. Germain; Dave Chavarri; Bob Marlette; Cristian Machado; Eddie Wohl

Ill Niño chronology
One Nation Underground (2005)	The Best of Ill Niño (2006)	The Undercover Sessions (2006)

Professional ratings
Review scores
Source	Rating
AllMusic	3/5 stars

The Best of Ill Niño is a compilation album released by Roadrunner Records on September 12, 2006. The album features material from the band's first 3 studio albums released with the label (as such, material from the Ill Niño EP wasn't included). The record was released without Ill Niño's involvement (they were by that time, signed to Cement Shoes Records).

The album was released simultaneously with similarly unsanctioned best-of collections of the bands Sepultura, Fear Factory and Type O Negative.

== Track listing ==
No.	Title	Length
1.	"What Comes Around"	3:46
2.	"Unreal"	3:33
3.	"God Save Us"	3:39
4.	"If You Still Hate Me"	2:55
5.	"Liar"	3:31
6.	"This Time's for Real"	3:27
7.	"How Can I Live"	3:16
8.	"Cleansing"	3:45
9.	"Te Amo...I Hate You"	3:32
10.	"What You Deserve"	3:00
11.	"This Is War"	3:46
12.	"Turns to Gray"	3:23
13.	"Corazon of Mine"	3:30
Total length:		45:03

- Tracks 1–5 are from the album Revolution Revolución.
- Tracks 6–9 are from the album Confession.
- Tracks 10–13 are from the album One Nation Underground.

== Personnel ==
- Cristian Machado – vocals
- Jardel Martins Paisante – guitar
- Marc Rizzo – guitar on tracks 1–7
- Ahrue Luster – guitar on tracks 8–13
- Lazaro Pina – bass
- Dave Chavarri – drums
- Roger Vasquez – percussion on tracks 1–5
- Daniel Couto – percussion on tracks 6–13
- Omar Clavijo – keyboards
- Eddie Wohl
