= Freddy vs. Jason (soundtrack) =

Freddy vs. Jason: The Original Motion Picture Soundtrack

Soundtrack album by Various artists
- Released: August 12, 2003
- Recorded: 2002–2003
- Genres: Alternative metal; nu metal; metalcore; groove metal; gothic metal; industrial metal
- Length: 77:59
- Label: Roadrunner
- Producer: Michelle Van Arendonk (executive)

Singles from Freddy vs. Jason: The Original Motion Picture Soundtrack
- 1. "How Can I Live" Released: July 22, 2003; 2. "Sun Doesn't Rise" Released: August 12, 2003

Professional ratings
Review scores
Source	Rating
AllMusic	3/5 stars
IGN	6.8/10

Freddy vs. Jason: The Original Motion Picture Soundtrack is the soundtrack to the 2003 film Freddy vs. Jason. It was released on August 12, 2003, by Roadrunner Records. The album features twenty tracks, fourteen of them previously unreleased by the bands in question.

== Track listing ==
No.	Title	Lyrics	Music	Producer(s)	Length
1.	"How Can I Live" (Ill Niño)	Cristian Machado	Machado; Dave Chavarri; Laz Pina; Jardel Paisante; Marc Rizzo	Bob Marlette; Chavarri (co.)	3:18
2.	"When Darkness Falls" (Killswitch Engage)	Howard Jones	Killswitch Engage	Adam Dutkiewicz	4:02
3.	"The Beginning of the End" (Spineshank)	Tommy Decker; Jonny Santos	Spineshank	GGGarth; Mike Sarkisyan (co.); Decker (co.)	3:32
4.	"Sun Doesn't Rise" (Mushroomhead)	Jeff Hetrick; Jason Popson	Steve Felton; Hetrick; Dave Felton; Popson; Marko Vukcevich; Tom Schmitz; Jack Kilcoyne	Johnny K; Mushroomhead	3:13
5.	"Condemned Until Rebirth" (Hatebreed)	Hatebreed	Hatebreed	Matt Hyde	2:07
6.	"Snap ('97 demo)" (Slipknot)	Slipknot	Slipknot	Slipknot	2:42
7.	"Army of Me" (Chimaira)	Mark Hunter	Rob Arnold	Ben Schigel; Hunter (co.); Arnold (co.)	4:21
8.	"The After Dinner Payback" (From Autumn to Ashes)	From Autumn to Ashes	From Autumn to Ashes	GGGarth	2:50
9.	"Leech" (Sevendust)	Sevendust	Sevendust	Ben Grosse	4:30
10.	"Bombshell" (Powerman 5000)	Spider	Powerman 5000	Terry Date	3:14
11.	"Welcome to the Strange" (Murderdolls)	Joey Jordison; Joseph Poole	Jordison; Poole	Jordison	4:19
12.	"Out Of My Way" (Seether)	James A. Johnston; Shaun Morgan Welgemoed; Dale Stewart; David Cohoe	Johnston; Welgemoed; Stewart; Cohoe	Ulrich Wild	3:51
13.	"Inside the Cynic" (Stone Sour)	Stone Sour	Stone Sour	Tom Tatman; Stone Sour	3:23
14.	"Swinging the Dead" (DevilDriver)	B. Dez Fafara	Evan Pitts; John Boecklin; Fafara	Ross Hogarth	3:38
15.	"The Waste" (Sepultura with Mike Patton)	Mike Patton	Andreas Kisser; Igor Cavalera	Howard Benson; Sepultura (co.)	3:39
16.	"The Middle of Nowhere" (The Blank Theory)	Nathan Leone	Michael Foderaro	Tim Patalan; James Iha (add.); Adam Schlesinger (add.)	4:05
17.	"Ether" (Nothingface)	Matthew Holt	Bill Gaal	Bill Kennedy; Gaal (add.)	3:43
18.	"Trigger" (In Flames)	Anders Fridén	Jesper Strömblad; Fridén	Daniel Bergstrand	4:56
19.	"11th Hour" (Lamb of God)	Lamb of God	Lamb of God	Devin Townsend; Lamb of God	3:44
20.	"(We Were) Electrocute" (Type O Negative)	Peter Steele	Steele	Josh Silver; Steele	6:49
Total length:					77:59

=== Other songs used in the film ===
- "Clap Your Hands Pt. 1" – IMx
- "First Time" – IMx
- "Nightmares" – Junkie XL
- "Forward" – Smitty
- "Guru" – Smitty
- "Running" – Smitty
- "Slavery" – Spineshank

Though not present in the film itself, Foo Fighters' "Come Back" is featured during the alternate ending, available on the Blu-ray version but not the DVD.

== Personnel ==
- Jay Baumgardner – mixing (1, 3, 16)
- Howard Benson – mixing (15)
- Daniel Bergstrand – mixing (18)
- Micaela Boland – package design
- Bobby Brooks – mixing (15)
- Paul Broucek – executive in charge of music
- Monte Conner – A&R
- Jessica Dolinger – music clearance
- Adam Dutkiewicz – mixing (2)
- Boris Elkis – programming
- Anders Fridén – mixing (18)
- Mike Gitter – A&R
- Ben Grosse – mixing (9)
- Ross Hogarth – mixing (14)
- Ted Jensen – mastering
- Bill Kennedy – mixing (17)
- Kodō – arranging (15)
- Lamb of God – mixing (19)
- Mike Marciano – mixing (20)
- George Marino – compilation, mastering
- UE Nastasi – compilation
- Örjan Örnkloo – mixing (18)
- Mike Patton – vocals (15)
- Colin Richardson – mixing (7, 11)
- Ben Schigel – engineer (7)
- Annie Searles – music clearance
- Sepultura – arranging (15)
- Chris Shaw – mixing (8)
- Josh Silver – mixing (20)
- Randy Staub – mixing (5)
- Peter Steele – additional mixing (20)
- Shaun Thingvold – mixing (19)
- Michelle Van Arendonk – A&R, executive music supervisor
- Andy Wallace – mixing (10)
- Matt Wallace – mixing (4)
- Ulrich Wild – mixing (12)
- Toby Wright – mixing (13)

== Charts ==
Weekly chart performance for Freddy vs. Jason
Chart (2003)	Peak position
US Billboard 200	25
US Soundtrack Albums (Billboard)	4

=== Singles ===
Year	Single	Chart	Position
2003	"How Can I Live"	Mainstream Rock Tracks	26

== See also ==
- Friday on Elm Street
