= One Nation Underground (Ill Niño album) =

Studio album by Ill Niño
- Released: September 27, 2005
- Recorded: 2004–2005
- Genre: Latin metal; nu metal
- Label: Roadrunner
- Producer: Eddie Wohl; Dave Chavarri; Cristian Machado (add.); Dan Korneff (add.)

Ill Niño chronology
Confession (2003)	One Nation Underground (2005)	The Best of Ill Niño (2006)

Singles from One Nation Underground
- 1. "What You Deserve" Released: 2005; 2. "This Is War" Released: 2006

Professional ratings
Review scores
Source	Rating
AllMusic	3/5 stars
Melodic	3/5 stars

One Nation Underground is the third album by Ill Niño and their final studio album released through Roadrunner. It debuted at No. 101 on the Billboard Top 200 with first week sales of nearly 11,000. Its sales of approximately 210,000 are well down on the near Gold selling Confession. This is the band's last album with guitarist Jardel Paisante.

== Track listing ==
All lyrics are written by Cristian Machado; all music is composed by Ill Niño.

No.	Title	Length
1.	"This Is War"	3:46
2.	"My Resurrection"	2:55
3.	"What You Deserve"	3:00
4.	"Turns to Gray" (featuring Jamey Jasta of Hatebreed)	3:23
5.	"De la Vida"	4:04
6.	"La Liberacion of Our Awakening"	3:44
7.	"All I Ask For"	3:39
8.	"Corazon of Mine"	3:30
9.	"Everything Beautiful"	3:14
10.	"In This Moment"	3:23
11.	"My Pleasant Torture"	4:29
12.	"Barely Breathing"	1:05
13.	"Violent Saint"	3:46

Japanese Edition bonus track
No.	Title	Length
14.	"Frustrated" (Demo)	4:17

Special Edition bonus tracks
No.	Title	Length
14.	"Can't Forgive, Can't Forget" (Demo)	4:15
15.	"Frustrated" (Demo)	4:23
16.	"Red Rain" (Peter Gabriel cover)	5:18

== Personnel ==
Ill Niño

- Cristian Machado – vocals, additional guitar
- Dave Chavarri – drums, additional percussion
- Laz Pina – bass
- Jardel Paisante – guitar
- Ahrue Luster – guitar
- Daniel Couto – percussion

Additional musicians

- Omar Clavijo – programming, keyboards
- Eddie Wohl – additional keyboards
- Jamey Jasta – additional vocals on "Turns to Gray"

Production and design

- Eddie Wohl – producer, mixing, additional engineering
- Dave Chavarri – producer, mixing
- Dan Korneff – mixing, engineer, additional production, digital editing
- Cristian Machado – additional production
- Nick Cohen – additional engineering, digital editing
- Omar Clavijo – additional engineering
- Sean Ragon – assistant engineer
- The Jerry Farley – digital editing
- Chris Fasulo – digital editing
- UE Nastasi – mastering
- Charles Dooher – art direction
- Daragh McDonagh – photography
