= Enigma (Ill Niño album) =

Studio album by Ill Niño
- Released: March 11, 2008
- Recorded: 2007 in Los Angeles, California
- Genre: Alternative metal; metalcore; nu metal; Latin metal
- Length: 54:04
- Label: Cement Shoes
- Producer: Eddie Wohl; Dave Chavarri; Cristian Machado; Ill Niño (co.)

Ill Niño chronology
| The Under Cover Sessions (2006) | Enigma (2008) | Dead New World (2010) |

Singles from Enigma
- 1. "The Alibi of Tyrants" Released: 2007; 2. "Me Gusta la Soledad" Released: 2008

Enigma is the fourth studio album by American heavy metal band Ill Niño, released in the United States on March 11, 2008 through Cement Shoes Records. The album's first single "The Alibi of Tyrants" was released to radio on April 22, 2007. The band has stated they would film three music videos from the album, including "The Alibi of Tyrants", "Me Gusta La Soledad" and "Pieces of the Sun". The album was originally set for a July 17, 2007 release, but was delayed on several occasions. The album is available on most digital distribution platforms, including iTunes.

The album debuted and peaked on the Billboard charts at No. 145, with first week's sales of 6,000 copies. By June 2010, the album had allegedly sold 80,000 copies worldwide. With a total length of over 50 minutes, it's the band's longest studio album to date, not counting special editions with bonus tracks.

== Track listing ==
All lyrics are written by Cristian Machado; all music is composed by Machado, Ahrue Luster, Laz Pina, and Dave Chavarri; except "De Sangre Hermosa", additional music by Diego Verduzco.

| No. | Title | Length |
|---|---|---|
| 1. | "The Alibi of Tyrants" | 3:51 |
| 2. | "Pieces of the Sun" | 4:18 |
| 3. | "Finger Painting (With the Enemy)" | 4:07 |
| 4. | "March Against Me" | 3:31 |
| 5. | "Compulsion of Virus and Fever" | 4:25 |
| 6. | "Formal Obsession" | 4:18 |
| 7. | "Hot Summer's Tragedy" | 5:10 |
| 8. | "Me Gusta La Soledad" | 4:34 |
| 9. | "2012" | 4:28 |
| 10. | "Guerrilla Carnival" | 3:46 |
| 11. | "Estoy Perdido" | 3:36 |
| 12. | "Kellogg's, Bombs & Cracker Jacks" | 4:04 |
| 13. | "De Sangre Hermosa" | 3:59 |

=== Limited edition ===
The European version of the album was released in a limited edition digipak, including all five tracks from the band's 2006 EP The Under Cover Sessions.

| No. | Title | Length |
|---|---|---|
| 14. | "Arrastra" |
| 15. | "Zombie Eaters" (Featuring Chino Moreno of Deftones) |
| 16. | "Reservation for Two" |
| 17. | "Red Rain (Peter Gabriel cover)" |
| 18. | "Territorial Pissings" (Nirvana Cover) |

== Singles ==
- "The Alibi of Tyrants" – The video was filmed live at the 2007 With Full Force festival in Germany.

== Personnel ==
Ill Niño

- Cristian Machado – vocals, additional guitars
- Dave Chavarri – drums, additional percussion
- Laz Pina – bass guitar, additional guitars (8)
- Ahrue Luster – lead guitar
- Danny Couto – percussion
- Diego Verduzco – guitars

Additional musicians

- Omar Clavijo – programming and keyboards
- Oscar Santiago – additional percussion
- Eddie Wohl – additional keyboards

Production and design

- Eddie Wohl – producer
- Dave Chavarri – producer
- Cristian Machado – producer
- Ill Niño – co-producer
- Jay Baumgardner – mixing
- Kent Hertz – engineer, digital editing
- Doug Strub – engineer 2
- Jon Chourron – engineer 3
- Chris Fasulo – digital editing
- Dave Schiffman – digital editing
- John Cranfield – digital editing
- Dan Korneff – digital editing
- Dave Schultz – mastering
- Josh Atchley – art direction, design
- Chris Kabisch – art direction, design
