= Element Eighty =

American nu metal band

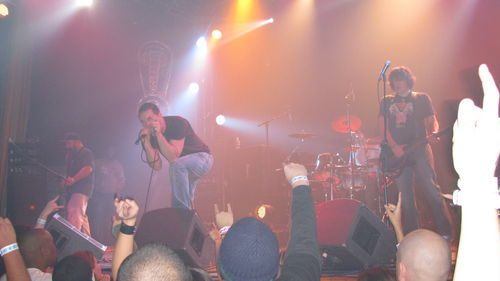

Background information
- Origin: Tyler, Texas, U.S.
- Genres: Nu metal
- Years active: 2000-2006, 2007-2010, 2021-present
- Labels: Pale Star, Texas Cries, Universal

Element Eighty is an American nu metal band from Tyler, Texas, formed in 2000. The band split in 2006, only to be reunited a few months later in 2007. According to singer David Galloway, the name of the band was inspired by Metallica and the Periodic Table of the Elements. "I can remember sitting in a physics class when I was in Ninth Grade, scribbling song lyrics in a notebook and trying to think up a good name for the band. I also remembered that Metallica supposedly got their name from the periodic table, so as I was sitting in that class I checked out what the heaviest metal on that table was - it turned out to be mercury, which is the 80th element on the periodic charts. That's how we became Element Eighty."

== History ==
=== Formation and Mercuric (2000–2003) ===
Formed in May 2000, Element Eighty quickly established themselves as an up-and-coming hard rock and metal act, performing throughout the Dallas-Fort Worth Metroplex region, Oklahoma, and across the state of Texas. In 2001, they entered the studio with Denton-based producer Eric Delegard and recorded their debut album, Mercuric, which was self-released on June 23, 2001 through Pale Star Records. The inspiration for the album name came from the element mercury, which also as element number eighty inspired the name of the band, on the periodic table and is a reference to the band's heavy metal style. For much of the next two years, the band toured extensively in support of the album. The album spawned a hit single, "Echo Song," which entered regular rotation and became a top-requested song on Dallas radio station KEGL 97.1 The Eagle. In late 2002, the band began planning their next album. In February 2003, the band's single "Goodbye" was added to regular rotation on 97.1 The Eagle, the first local song to enter the rotation since Drowning Pool's "Tear Away".

=== Element Eighty (2003–2004) ===
Although the band initially planned to return to the studio with Eric D. to record their follow-up album, which was to be titled Summerstar, and which had a projected release date of June 28, 2003, after receiving interest from several major record labels including Wind-Up and Atlantic, the project was put on hold indefinitely. On March 22, 2003, the band would announce the signing of a record contract with Universal/Republic Records. On March 28, 2003, the band embarked on a tour in support of Mudvayne and In Flames. During the summer of 2003, they recorded their major label debut album with LA-based producer Scott Humphrey. Their self-titled album Element Eighty was released on October 28, 2003. In December, they toured with Flaw on 40 Below Summer's The Mourning After tour. In 2004, the band would join Sevendust and Ill Nino on the Seasons tour. Throughout their careers, the band has toured or shared the stage with artists such as Sevendust, Mudvayne, 3 Doors Down, Slipknot, Marilyn Manson, Staind, Shinedown, Korn, Hellyeah, Ill Niño, Flaw, 40 Below Summer, Mushroomhead, Saliva, and Dope. The song "Broken Promises" was featured on the Need for Speed: Underground video game soundtrack. The song also peaked at No. 36 on the U.S. Mainstream Rock charts.

After several months of touring, the band could see that their label had no interest in pushing the band – there was no music video or any kind of promotion. The band would later split with Universal/Republic late 2004. Shortly afterwards, in October 2004, the band announced Roon's decision to leave them. His replacement, Zack Bates, formerly of the band Bullet Ant, was announced in early November 2004.

=== The Bear (2005–2009) ===
The band released their third album The Bear in November 2005, via their own label, Texas Cries Records. The album was only made available through the band's official website, at shows, and digital distribution/streaming. The band played their final show on December 31, 2009 at the Ridglea Theater in Fort Worth, Texas. The band announced in 2010 that they had broken up due to overwhelming life circumstances.

=== Return and A.D. (2021–present) ===
After a 12 year silence, Element Eighty reunited in 2021, agreeing that it was time for a full relaunch of the band. The band recorded a new, heavier version of their song "Ego" on December 3, 2021, and released the new single "Mountain" on September 9, 2022. Recording for their fourth album was finished in 2023 and after 14 years, the band finally released their long awaited new album A.D. on June 23, 2023.

== Members ==
Current lineup

- David Galloway – vocals (2000-2010, 2021–present)
- Matt Woods – guitars (2000–2010, 2021–present)
- Zack Bates – bass (2005–2010, 2021–present)
- Ryan Carroll – drums (2000–2010, 2021–present)

Former members

- Roon – bass (2000-2005)

== Discography ==
Studio albums

- Mercuric (2001)
- Element Eighty (2003)
- The Bear (2005)
- A.D. (2023)
