= Confession (Ill Niño album) =

Studio album by Ill Niño
- Released: September 30, 2003
- Recorded: 2002–2003
- Studio: Water Music Studios in Hoboken, New Jersey and Mirror Image Recorders in New York City
- Genre: Nu metal; alternative metal; Latin metal
- Length: 47:07
- Label: Roadrunner
- Producer: Bob Marlette; Dave Chavarri

Ill Niño chronology
| Revolution Revolución (2001) | Confession (2003) | One Nation Underground (2005) |

Singles from Confession
- 1. "How Can I Live" Released: July 22, 2003; 2. "This Time's for Real" Released: January 20, 2004; 3. "Cleansing" Released: 2005

Professional ratings
Review scores
| Source | Rating |
|---|---|
| AllMusic | Not rated |
| Exclaim! | Positive |

Confession is the second album released by the American heavy metal band Ill Niño. The album debuted at #37 in the Billboard Top 200 with first week sales of 27,863. It is their most successful album to date, selling more than 600,000 copies worldwide by 2023. It was the first album to not feature Marc Rizzo, who left during recording to join Soulfly, and also the first to feature Ahrue Luster, formerly of Machine Head.

== Track listing ==
All lyrics are written by Cristian Machado

| No. | Title | Writer(s) | Length |
|---|---|---|---|
| 1. | "Te Amo...I Hate You" | Machado, Chavarri, Paisante, Pina | 3:33 |
| 2. | "How Can I Live" | Marlette, Chavarri, Machado, Paisante, Pina, Rizzo | 3:17 |
| 3. | "Two (Vaya Con Dios)" | Marlette, Chavarri, Machado, Paisante, Pina | 3:23 |
| 4. | "Unframed" | Marlette, Chavarri, Machado, Paisante, Pina | 3:23 |
| 5. | "Cleansing" | Machado, Chavarri, Paisante, Pina | 3:45 |
| 6. | "This Time's for Real" | Marlette, Chavarri, Machado, Paisante, Pina, Rizzo | 3:27 |
| 7. | "Lifeless...Life..." | Marlette, Chavarri, Machado, Paisante, Pina, Rizzo | 2:47 |
| 8. | "Numb" | Marlette, Chavarri, Machado, Paisante, Pina, Rizzo | 4:06 |
| 9. | "Have You Ever Felt?" (feat. Max Illidge of 40 Below Summer) | Machado, Chavarri, Paisante, Pina | 3:18 |
| 10. | "When It Cuts" | Machado, Chavarri, Paisante, Pina, Rizzo | 2:48 |
| 11. | "Letting Go" | Marlette, Chavarri, Machado, Paisante, Pina | 3:18 |
| 12. | "All the Right Words" | Marlette, Chavarri, Machado, Paisante, Pina, Rizzo | 4:08 |
| 13. | "Re-Birth" | Marlette, Chavarri, Machado, Paisante, Pina, Rizzo | 2:54 |
| 14. | "How Can I Live" (Spanish Version) | Marlette, Chavarri, Machado, Paisante, Pina, Rizzo | 3:08 |

French edition bonus tracks
| No. | Title | Writer(s) | Length |
|---|---|---|---|
| 15. | "How Can I Live" (Single mix) | Marlette, Chavarri, Machado, Paisante, Pina, Rizzo | 2:57 |
| 16. | "I'll Find a Way" | Chavarri, Machado, Rizzo | 3:59 |
| 17. | "Someone Or Something" (Also Japanese edition bonus track) | Machado, Chavarri, Marlette, Paisante, Pina, Rizzo | 3:06 |

iTunes Bonus Track Version
| No. | Title | Writer(s) | Length |
|---|---|---|---|
| 15. | "Make Me Feel" | Machado, Chavarri, Marlette, Paisante, Pina, Rizzo | 3:08 |
| 16. | "Clear" | Chavarri, Machado, Rizzo | 3:59 |
| 17. | "Forever" | | 3:09 |

Notes:

- The iTunes bonus tracks "Make Me Feel" and "Clear" are the same as "Someone or Something" and "I'll Find a Way", respectively. They seemingly retained their demo titles on iTunes for unknown reasons.
- A fan-made compilation titled Demo Sessions includes three demo tracks from the album's recording sessions, "Make Me Feel" (with different lyrics), "About Them" and "Every Day". It also includes acoustic performances of "How Can I Live" and "This Time's for Real", recorded live at the AAF studios.
- "Have You Ever Felt?" is featured in the game Ghost Recon Advanced Warfighter for the Xbox 360.
- "When It Cuts" is featured in the PlayStation Portable game Infected.
- "How Can I Live" is featured in the horror film Freddy vs. Jason and appears on the soundtrack.
- "I'll Find a Way" is featured on the soundtrack to the 2005 film The Cave, titled "I'll Find the Way".

== Personnel ==
=== Ill Niño ===
- Cristian Machado – vocals
- Ahrue Luster – lead guitar
- Jardel Paisante – rhythm guitar
- Laz Piña – bass guitar
- Omar Clavijo – keyboards, turntables, programming
- Danny Couto – percussion
- Dave Chavarri – drums

=== Additional personnel ===
- Joe Rodriguez – additional percussion
- Marc Rizzo – additional guitar/ acoustic guitar (on tracks 2, 4, 6–8, 10–17)
- Max Illidge – additional vocals (on track 9) (40 Below Summer, Black Market Hero)
- Mikey Doling – additional guitar (on track 3) (Snot, ex-Soulfly, ex-Abloom, currently Invitro)
- Bob Marlette – additional piano (on tracks 8, 12, 15, 17)

=== Production ===
- Bob Marlette – producer, engineering
- Jay Baumgardner – mixing
- Michael Barbiero – mixing
- Michael Koch – engineering
- Dan Korneff – digital editing, engineering
- Jerry Farley – digital editing
- John Bender – assistant engineering
- Myriam Santos-Kayda – photography
- Julian Joyce – assistant engineering
- Lynde Kusnetz – creative director
- Ted Jensen – mastering

== Charts ==
Weekly chart performance for Confession
| Chart (2003) | Peak position |
|---|---|
| Dutch Albums (Album Top 100) | 95 |
| French Albums (SNEP) | 90 |
| German Albums (Offizielle Top 100) | 67 |
| Italian Albums (FIMI) | 57 |
| Japanese Albums (Oricon) | 229 |
| UK Albums (OCC) | 118 |
| UK Rock & Metal Albums (OCC) | 14 |
| US Billboard 200 | 37 |
