= Epidemia (album) =

Studio album by Ill Niño
- Released: October 22, 2012
- Genre: Nu metal; metalcore
- Length: 37:25
- Label: Victory
- Producer: Christian Machado, Ahrue Luster

Ill Niño chronology
Dead New World (2010)	Epidemia (2012)	Till Death, La Familia (2014)

Singles from Epidemia
- 1. "The Depression" Released: September 25, 2012; 2. "Forgive Me Father" Released: 2013

Professional ratings
Review scores
Source	Rating
AllMusic	3/5 stars
Metal Hammer	2.5/5 stars

Epidemia is the sixth studio album released by American heavy metal band Ill Niño. It was released on October 22, 2012, through Victory Records and is the band's shortest studio album to date. It is also the last album to feature percussionist Daniel Couto, following his departure from the band in 2013, although he has since returned to the band as of 2019.

== Track listing ==
All songs written and composed by Ill Niño

No.	Title	Length
1.	"The Depression"	3:44
2.	"Only the Unloved"	3:39
3.	"La Epidemia" (feat. Frankie Palmeri of Emmure)	3:10
4.	"Eva"	4:12
5.	"Demi-God"	3:17
6.	"Death Wants More"	3:35
7.	"Escape"	3:33
8.	"Time Won't Save You"	4:49
9.	"Forgive Me Father"	3:28
10.	"Invisible People"	3:58
Total length:		37:25

== Personnel ==
- Dave Chavarri - drums, Art direction
- Cristian Machado - vocals
- Ahrue Luster - lead guitar
- Diego Verduzco - rhythm guitar
- Lazaro Pina - bass, Art direction
- Daniel Couto - percussion

Production

- Ahrue Luster - producer, engineering, digital editing
- Christian Machado - producer, engineering, digital editing
- Jonathan Lafuentes - engineering, digital editing, mastering
- Dan Korneff - mixing
- River Clark - cover Art, photography

Additional musicians

- Frank Palmeri - guest vocals on La Epidemia

== Chart performance ==
Chart (2012)	Peak position
US Hard Rock Albums	18
