= Dog Jam =

Music festival in Beaumont, Texas

Dog Jam was an annual rock festival held at Ford Park in Beaumont, Texas since 2001. It is sponsored by local rock radio station KIOC Big Dog 106 and Bud Light. Previous bands to play there include Default, 3 Doors Down, Breaking Benjamin, Korn, Droid, Five Finger Death Punch, Hellyeah, Element Eighty, Shinedown, and Staind.

== History ==
Dog Jam started out at the old South Texas State Fair Fairgrounds in 2001 with the headlining band being Union Underground. Since then, the event has attracted bigger name bands and a better venue in Ford Park. In 2007, though, it was held in the Montagne Center at Lamar University. There was no Dog Jam in 2008, due to the devastation caused by Hurricane Ike.
