= What Comes Around (song) =

Single by Ill Niño

from the album Revolution Revolución
- Released: 2001
- Genre: Nu metal
- Length: 3:46 (album version); 3:29 (radio edit)
- Label: Roadrunner
- Songwriter(s): Christian Machado; Marc Rizzo; Dave Chavarri
- Producer(s): St. Germain; Dave Chavarri

Ill Niño singles chronology
| "God Save Us" (2001) | "What Comes Around" (2001) | "Unreal" (2002) |

"What Comes Around" is a song by American heavy metal band Ill Niño. The song was released as the second single from the group's debut studio album Revolution Revolución. The track is the band's most successful single, peaking on charts in both the US and UK. Reached #1 on NYC’s FM K ROCK. A Spanish version was recorded and released on the special edition of Revolution Revolución. The song is also included on Roadrunner Records' XXX: Three Decades of Roadrunner box set on disc two.

== Track listing ==
| No. | Title | Length |
|---|---|---|
| 1. | "What Comes Around" (edit) | 3:29 |
| 2. | "Fallen" | 3:37 |
| 3. | "God Save Us" (live) | 3:42 |
| 4. | "What Comes Around" (album version) | 3:46 |

== Music video ==
The song's official music video shows the band performing the song in a field, inner-cut with footage of a group of friends interacting with each other. Directed by Marcos Siega.

== Chart positions ==
| Chart (2002) | Peak position |
|---|---|
| US Mainstream Rock Tracks | 28 |
| UK Singles Chart | 81 |
| UK Rock Chart | 7 |
