= Unreal (song) =

Single by Ill Niño

from the album Revolution Revolución
- Released: November 4, 2002
- Genre: Nu metal
- Length: 3:33
- Label: Roadrunner
- Songwriters: Christian Machado, Marc Rizzo, Dave Chavarri
- Producers: St. Germain, Dave Chavarri

Ill Niño singles chronology
"What Comes Around" (2002)	"Unreal" (2002)	"How Can I Live" (2003)

"Unreal" is a song by American metal band Ill Niño. The song was released as the band's third and final single from their debut album Revolution Revolución.

== Music video ==
The song's official music video shows the band performing the song live.

== Track listing ==
No.	Title	Length
1.	"Unreal" (Reborn Mix)	3:33
2.	"Eye for an Eye" (live; Soulfly cover)	3:55
3.	"What Comes Around" (Spanish version)	3:46

== Chart positions ==
Chart (2002)	Peak position
UK Singles Chart	126
UK Rock Chart	15

== Personnel ==
- Christian Machado – vocals
- Jardel Martins Paisante – guitar, acoustic guitar solo
- Marc Rizzo – guitar
- Lazaro Pina – bass
- Dave Chavarri – drums
- Roger Vasquez – percussion
