= Invitation to the Dance =

Invitation to the Dance can refer to:

- Invitation to the Dance (album), a 2001 album by the group 40 Below Summer
- Invitation to the Dance (film), a 1956 film starring and directed by Gene Kelly
- "Invitation to the Dance" (Weber), a piece for piano written in 1819 by Carl Maria von Weber, and arranged for orchestra by Hector Berlioz
