= The Under Cover Sessions =

EP by Ill Niño
- Released: November 7, 2006
- Recorded: Los Angeles, California
- Genre: Nu metal
- Length: 19:18
- Label: Cement Shoes Records
- Producer: Andy Johns; Dave Chavarri; Eddie Wohl; Cristian Machado (co.)

Ill Niño chronology
The Best of Ill Niño (2006)	The Under Cover Sessions (2006)	Enigma (2008)

Singles from The Under Cover Sessions
- 1. "Arrasta" Released: 2006

Professional ratings
Review scores
Source	Rating
Sputnikmusic	3/5 stars

The Under Cover Sessions is a five-track EP by American heavy metal band Ill Niño, released on November 7, 2006, via Cement Shoes Records. It is their first release on the label, after departing Roadrunner Records in June 2006. The EP was the first to feature Diego Verduzco on guitar (originally in Odum), as a stand-in for Jardel Paisante, who had not been a part of the group since the spring of 2006. He was said to be dealing with personal family problems. Verduzco was also on the photo shoots of Ill Niño for the EP, so many fans saw him as a full-time replacement for Jardel Paisante. Only 20,000 copies of the EP were released. It sold 1,300 copies during its first week of release.

== Track listing ==
No.	Title	Writer(s)	Length
1.	"Arrastra"	Ill Niño (music); Cristian Machado (lyrics)	3:20
2.	"Zombie Eaters" (featuring Chino Moreno of Deftones, Faith No More cover)	Mike Bordin; Roddy Bottum; Bill Gould; Jim Martin; Michael Patton	5:59
3.	"Reservation for Two"	Ill Niño (music); Machado (lyrics)	3:15
4.	"Red Rain" (Peter Gabriel cover)	Peter Gabriel	4:15
5.	"Territorial Pissings" (Nirvana cover)	Nirvana; Kurt Cobain	2:27
Total length:			19:18

== Personnel ==
- Cristian Machado - vocals
- Ahrue Luster - lead guitar
- Diego Verduzco - rhythm guitar
- Lazaro Piña - bass
- Dave Chavarri - drums
- Danny Couto - percussion
- Omar Clavijo - keyboards
- Chino Moreno - vocals on "Zombie Eaters"
