= Till Death, La Familia =

Studio album by Ill Niño
- Released: July 22, 2014
- Recorded: 2013 – 2014
- Genres: Alternative metal; nu metal; metalcore; Latin metal
- Length: 43:37
- Label: Victory
- Producers: Eddie Wohl, Dave Chavarri & Ill Niño

Ill Niño chronology
Epidemia (2012)	Till Death, La Familia (2014)

Singles from Till Death, La Familia
- 1. "Live Like There's No Tomorrow" Released: June 23, 2014; 2. "I'm Not the Enemy" Released: July 8, 2014

Professional ratings
Review scores
Source	Rating
Blabbermouth.net	7.5/10
Melodic.net	3.5/5 stars

Till Death, La Familia is the seventh studio album, released by American heavy metal band Ill Niño. The album was released on July 22, 2014, through Victory Records. This is the last Ill Niño album to feature Cristian Machado on vocals, Ahrue Luster on lead guitar, Diego Verduzco on rhythm guitar, and the only Ill Nino album to feature Oscar Santiago on percussion.

== Track listing ==
All songs written and composed by Ill Niño

No.	Title	Length
1.	"Live Like There's No Tomorrow"	4:23
2.	"Not Alive in My Nightmare"	4:25
3.	"I'm Not the Enemy"	3:31
4.	"Blood Is Thicker than Water"	5:59
5.	"Are We So Innocent"	3:53
6.	"Pray I Don't Find You"	4:10
7.	"World So Cold"	3:38
8.	"Dead Friends"	3:40
9.	"Breaking the Rules"	3:45
10.	"Payaso"	2:51
11.	"My Bullet"	3:21
Total length:		43:37

== Personnel ==
- Cristian Machado - vocals
- Ahrue Luster - lead guitar, engineering
- Diego Verduzco - rhythm guitar
- Lazaro Pina - bass, engineering
- Dave Chavarri - drums, co-production
- Oscar Santiago - percussion

== Chart performance ==
The album debuted at No 143 on the Billboard 200.

Chart (2014)	Peak position
US Billboard 200	143
US Rock Albums	49
US Hard Rock Albums	18
