= This Time's for Real =

Single by Ill Niño

from the album Confession
- Released: January 20, 2004
- Recorded: Water Music Studios in Hoboken, NJ and Mirror Image Recorders in New York City
- Genre: Nu metal, hard rock
- Length: 3:29 (album version); 3:16 (radio edit)
- Label: Roadrunner
- Songwriter(s): Christian Machado
- Producer(s): Bob Marlette, Dave Chavarri, Cristian Machado

Ill Niño singles chronology
"How Can I Live" (2003)	"This Time's for Real" (2004)	"Cleansing" (2004)

"This Time's for Real" is a song by American metal band Ill Niño. The song was released as the second single from the band's second studio album Confession.

== Music video ==
The song's music video shows a boxer training intercut with footage of the band performing the song.

== Track listing ==
No.	Title	Length
1.	"This Time's for Real" (single version)	3:16
2.	"Someone or Something"	3:06
3.	"This Time's for Real" (album version)	3:29
4.	"This Time's for Real" (music video; enhanced content)	3:12

== Charts ==
Chart (2004)	Peak position
US Mainstream Rock Tracks (Billboard)	36
