= Rain (EP) =

EP by 40 Below Summer
- Released: Late 2000, July 31, 2007
- Recorded: July–August 2000
- Genre: Nu metal; alternative metal
- Length: 49:00 (2007); 25:00 (2000)
- Label: Crash Music (2007); Independent (2000)

40 Below Summer chronology
Side Show Freaks (1999)	Rain (2000)	Invitation to the Dance (2001)

Original Cover
- The original cover artwork for the EP

Rain is an EP by 40 Below Summer. The band's much sought-after independent EP was originally released in 2000 before they signed with London-Sire Records. The EP was reissued on July 31, 2007 via Crash Music Inc.

== Background and reception ==
The EP was recorded and mixed in July and August 2000. It was mastered by Al Silverman at ARF Digital, New York City.

In their 2001 review, Blabbermouth.net wrote "Although there is nothing on here that can be considered innovative or ground-breaking, 40 Below Summer possess a knack for mixing huge, hard-sounding grooves with near-first-rate quality vocal hooks, and they do so with a greater level of conviction than most of their counterparts. Among the best examples of this is the track "Endorphines", an excellently crafted number that starts out in a laid-back fashion but climaxes with what is arguably the catchiest chorus on the CD—a potential rock radio hit in the making."

The tracks "Falling Down" and "Jonesin" would be rerecorded for the band's first and only major label release Invitation to the Dance. "Faces" was also rerecorded during the Mourning After era as "P.S. I Hate You". It appeared on the 2003 video game Backyard Wrestling: Don't Try This at Home.

== Track listing ==
=== Original 2000 EP ===
1. Falling Down (demo) 4:36
2. Endorphins 5:58
3. Letter to God 5:11
4. Jonesin' (demo) 5:17
5. Faces 5:06

=== 2007 re-release ===
1. Falling Down (demo)
2. Endorphins
3. Letter to God
4. Faces
5. Jonesin' (demo)
6. We the People (demo)
7. Wither Away (demo)
8. Smile Electric (demo)
9. Rope (demo)
10. Power Tool (demo)
11. Minus One (demo)
12. Still Life (demo)

The original version had Faces and Jonesin' reversed, as is what is listed on the back of the re-release but, in fact, Faces is track 4 and Jonesin' is track 5 on the re-release.

== Personnel ==
Max Illidge: vocals
Joey D'Amico: guitar
Jordan Plingos: guitar
Hector Graziani: bass (credited but does not perform)
Carlos Aguilar: drums
Steve Ferierra: bass (original bassist, left after the recording)
