= Terror Universal =

American metal band

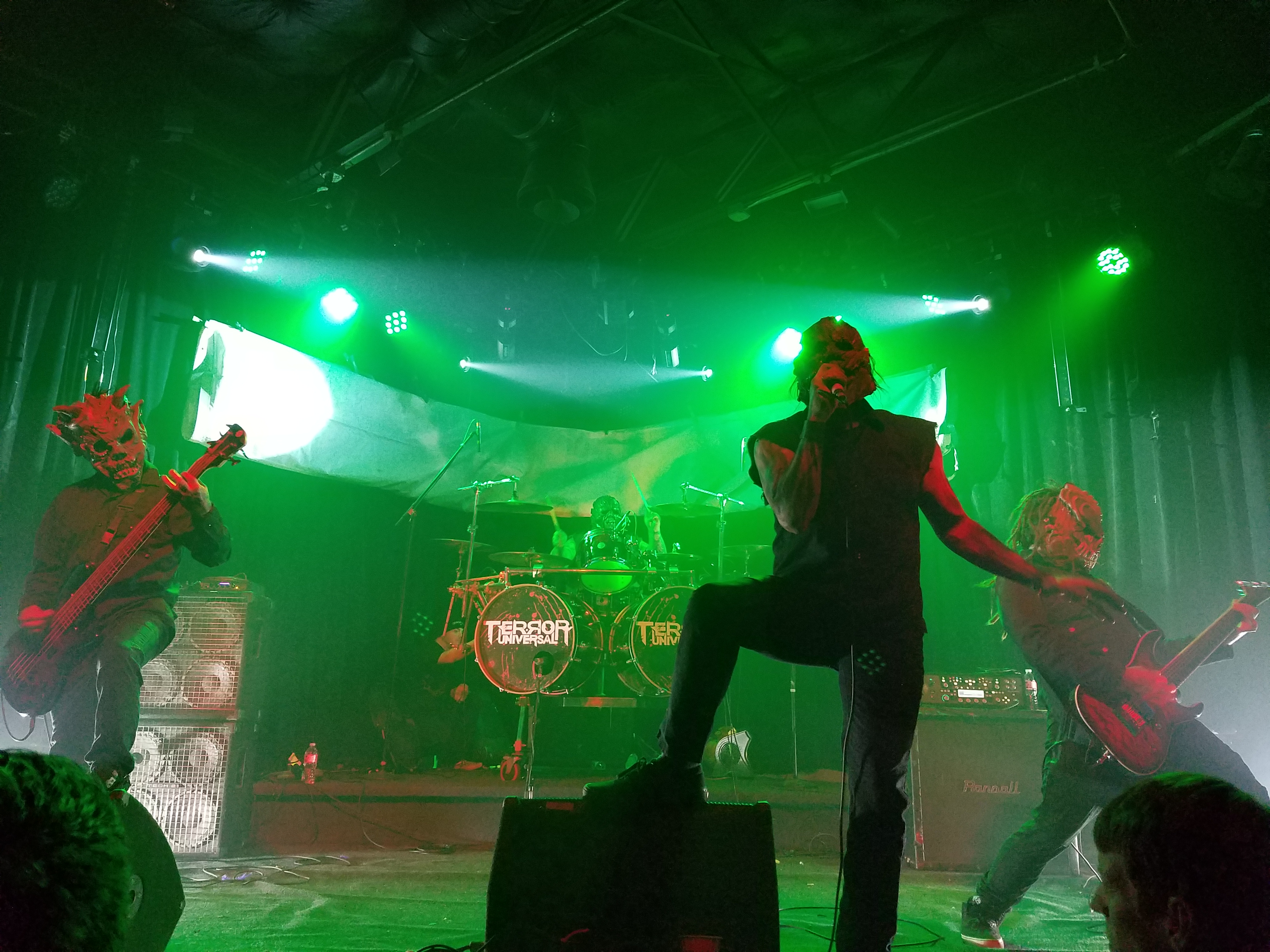
- Terror Universal performing in 2018

Background information
- Origin: United States
- Genres: Groove metal; nu metal; alternative metal
- Years active: 2014–present
- Members: Massacre; Diabolus; Thrax; Plague

Terror Universal is an American heavy metal supergroup consisting of current and former members of Soulfly, Upon a Burning Body and Ill Niño. Their first single, "Welcome to Hell", comes from their debut EP, Reign of Terror. The EP was released in February 2015. Their debut full-length album, Make Them Bleed, was released in January 2018.

AllMusic described the band as "horror metal" and their style of music as a blend of groove and nu metal with hard rock.

== Members ==
- Dave Chavarri (Massacre) – drums (2014–present)
- Rob Cisneros (Thrax) – lead guitar (2015–present), rhythm guitar (2014–2015)
- Wacy Jahn (Plague) – vocals, keyboards (2015–present)
- Salvadore Dominguez (Diabolus 2) – bass, rhythm guitar (2015–present)

Former

- Chad Armstrong (Rott) – vocals (2014–2015)
- Ahrue Luster (Diabolus) – lead guitar (2014–2015)

Timeline

== Discography ==
=== Studio albums ===
- Make Them Bleed (2018)

=== EPs ===
- Reign of Terror (2015)

=== Singles ===
- "Welcome to Hell"
