= How Can I Live =

Single by Ill Niño

from the album Confession and Freddy vs. Jason
- Released: July 22, 2003
- Recorded: Water Music Studios in Hoboken, NJ and Mirror Image Recorders in New York City
- Genre: Nu metal; alternative metal
- Length: 3:18 (album version); 2:59 (radio edit)
- Label: Roadrunner
- Songwriter: Cristian Machado
- Producers: Bob Marlette, Dave Chavarri, Cristian Machado

Ill Niño singles chronology
"Unreal" (2002)	"How Can I Live" (2003)	"This Time's for Real" (2004)

Music video
- "How Can I Live" on YouTube

"How Can I Live" is a song by American alternative metal band Ill Niño. The song was released as the lead single from the band's second album Confession. The song originally appeared on the soundtrack for the slasher film Freddy vs. Jason as well as playing over the film's end credits.

== Music video ==
The song's music video begins with a woman walking down a street, as the camera pans out to reveal the name of the street is Elm Street. The woman stops and looks around, with someone watching her from behind a fence. The woman tries to run away a few times, with the unseen presence chasing her, before she falls to the ground. At the end of the video the woman wakes up in bed, revealing that it was just a nightmare. The video's story with the woman is intercut with shots of the band performing the song in a room.

== Track listing ==
No.	Title	Length
1.	"How Can I Live" (single mix)	2:59
2.	"How Can I Live" (album version)	3:18
3.	"I'll Find a Way"	3:57
4.	"How Can I Live" (Spanglish version)	3:00

== Chart positions ==
Chart (2003)	Peak position
US Mainstream Rock Tracks	26
