= Ill Niño EP =

EP by Ill Niño
- Released: 2000
- Genre: Nu metal; alternative metal
- Length: 23:00
- Label: C.I.A.
- Producer: Dave Chavarri

Ill Niño chronology
El Niño (1998)	Ill Niño EP (2000)	Revolution Revolución (2001)

Ill Niño EP is a 2000 EP by American heavy metal band Ill Niño. It was produced by the band's drummer, Dave Chavarri, and distributed by C.I.A. Recordings. Following the EP's release, the band were signed to Roadrunner Records in June 2000.

== Track listing ==
All lyrics are written by Cristian Machado, except where noted; all music is composed by Machado, Marc Rizzo, Dave Chavarri

No.	Title	Lyrics	Length
1.	"Nothing's Clear"		3:34
2.	"Disposed"		4:14
3.	"Rumba"		3:25
4.	"Fallen"		3:50
5.	"Part of the Signs"		3:00
6.	"El Niño" (Live in the studio - 03.26.00)	Jorge Rosado	3:36
7.	"God Is I" (Live in the studio - 03.26.00)	Rosado	2:58
Total length:			23:00

== Personnel ==
Ill Niño

- Cristian Machado – vocals, additional bass
- Marc Rizzo – lead guitar, acoustic guitar
- Jardel Paisante – rhythm guitar
- Lazaro Pina – bass, assistant engineer
- Roger Vasquez – percussion
- Dave Chavarri – drums, percussion, producer, engineer, mixing

Additional

- DJ Pookie – electronics, turntables
- Frank White – photography
