= The Blank Theory =

American metal band

- Origin: Chicago, Illinois, U.S.
- Genres: Nu metal; alternative metal; hard rock
- Years active: 1998–2004
- Labels: New Line Records, Warner Brothers Japan
- Members: Nathan Leone; Michael Foderaro; Matthew Leone; James Knight; Shawn Currie

The Blank Theory was an American rock band from Chicago, Illinois.

== History ==
They self-released two EPs, Blinding Process in 1998 and Catalyst in 2000. Catalyst included the track "Nevermind" which was featured in a segment of MTV Road Rules. While the first two independent releases were hard rock, they moved more toward metal when writing for the third release. Upon signing to New Line Records, they teamed up with Adam Schlesinger (Ivy, Fountains of Wayne) and James Iha (The Smashing Pumpkins, A Perfect Circle) for production of Beyond the Calm of the Corridor. The Blank Theory released Beyond the Calm of the Corridor on September 24, 2002, via independent label, New Line Records.

Their cover of Portishead's "Sour Times" was one of two singles from Beyond the Calm of the Corridor and can be heard in the movie trailer to Wicker Park. The other single titled "Middle of Nowhere" was featured on the Freddy vs. Jason soundtrack and in Final Destination 2. Founding member and guitarist, Michael Foderaro, left the band in May 2003 to pursue other music projects. He was eventually replaced by guitarist Mateo Camargo from the band Reforma. In mid-2004, drummer James Knight and keyboardist Shawn Currie also left the band to pursue other music projects.

Eventually, vocalist Nathan Leone and bassist Matthew Leone, along with two members from Reforma (Dan Torelli and Mateo Camargo) formed Madina Lake.

== Personnel ==
=== Final lineup ===
- Nathan Leone – Vocals
- Mateo Camargo - Electric guitar
- Matthew Leone – Bass guitar
- Shawn Currie – Synth
- James Knight – Drums

=== Former members ===
- Michael Foderaro – Composer | Guitar

== Discography ==
=== Blinding Process EP (1999) ===
1. "Faded" – 4:56
2. "Anathema" – 3:22
3. "Broken Glass" – 6:42
4. "A Matter of Time" – 4:46
5. "Mourning Life" – 5:34

=== Catalyst EP (2000) ===
1. "Corporation" – 3:14
2. "Vanish" – 3:19
3. "Broken Glass" – 4:20
4. "Nevermind" – 3:24
5. "Recluse" – 4:08
6. "Faded" – 4:21
7. "Daylight's New Life" – 6:10
8. "The Disparate" – 6:15

=== Fascist Single (2000) ===
1. "Fascist" – 3:11

=== Beyond the Calm of the Corridor (2002) ===
1. "Middle of Nowhere" – 4:05
2. "Addicted" – 3:44
3. "Father's Eyes" – 3:09
4. "Sour Times" (Portishead cover) – 3:35
5. "Killing Me" – 4:05
6. "Invisible" – 3:07
7. "Broken" – 3:43
8. "Thicker" – 3:11
9. "Back of My Mind" – 3:30
10. "Recluse" – 3:41
11. "Corporation" – 3:15
12. "Fear of God" – 3:45
13. "Martyr" – 5:24
14. "Hey Bulldog" (The Beatles cover, bonus track for Japan) – 3:14
