= The Bear (album) =

Studio album by Element Eighty
- Released: November 5, 2005
- Recorded: 2004
- Genre: Nu metal; alternative metal
- Length: 31:13
- Label: Texas Cries (self-released)
- Producer: Eric Delegard

Element Eighty chronology
Element Eighty (2003)	The Bear (2005)	A.D. (2023)

Professional ratings
Review scores
Source	Rating
melodic.net	3/5 stars

The Bear is the third studio album by nu metal band Element Eighty, released in 2005 through the band's own label Texas Cries Records, and re-released in 2023. The physical album was only made available through the band's official website and at shows.

== Track listing ==
No.	Title	Length
1.	"Guntruck"	3:22
2.	"Victims"	2:56
3.	"The Sacrifice"	3:32
4.	"War"	3:27
5.	"Killing Me"	2:41
6.	"The Itch"	3:19
7.	"Boars"	2:26
8.	"Price to Pay"	3:42
9.	"Spite"	2:59
10.	"Beaumont"	2:46
Total length:		31:13
