= What You Deserve (song) =

Single by Ill Niño

from the album One Nation Underground
- Released: 2005
- Genre: Alternative metal, nu metal, metalcore
- Length: 3:00
- Label: Roadrunner
- Songwriter: Christian Machado
- Producer: Eddie Wohl

Ill Niño singles chronology
"Cleansing" (2004)	"What You Deserve" (2005)	"This Is War" (2006)

"What You Deserve" is a song by American metal band Ill Niño. The song was released as a single from the band's third studio album One Nation Underground. The song features a heavy use of electronics from keyboardist Omar Clavijo.

== Track listing ==
No.	Title	Length
1.	"What You Deserve"	3:00

== Charts ==
Chart (2002)	Peak position
US Mainstream Rock Tracks (Billboard)	33
