= Make Them Bleed =

Studio album by Terror Universal
- Released: January 19, 2018
- Genre: Groove metal, alternative metal, nu metal, metalcore
- Label: Minus Head Records
- Producer: Dave Chavarri

Terror Universal chronology
Reign of Terror (2015)	Make Them Bleed (2018)

Make Them Bleed is the debut studio album by American heavy metal band Terror Universal. It was released on January 19, 2018 via Minus Head Records.

== Track listing ==
All tracks written by Terror Universal.

1. "Passage of Pain"
2. "Welcome to Hell"
3. "Spines"
4. "Make Them Bleed"
5. "Through the Mirrors"
6. "Dig You a Hole"
7. "Dead on Arrival"
8. "Into Darkness"
9. "Your Time Has Come"
10. "Piece by Piece"

== Credits ==
- Wacy Jahn – vocals, keyboards
- Rob Cisneros – lead guitar
- Dave Chavarri – drums
- Salvador Dominguez – rhythm guitar, bass

== Chart positions ==
Chart (2018)	Peak position
Heatseekers Albums (Billboard)	5
Independent Albums (Billboard)	25

- No. 17 Billboard Hard Music chart
- No. 3 Metal Contraband's Most Added chart (#11 overall debut)
- No. 27 NACC Loud Rock chart
