= Invitation to the Dance (album) =

2001 studio album by 40 Below Summer

Studio album by 40 Below Summer
- Released: October 16, 2001
- Recorded: March–May 2001
- Studio: Cello & Sound City, Los Angeles
- Genre: Nu metal; alternative metal
- Length: 46:05
- Label: London-Sire (original); Reprise/Warner Bros. (current)
- Producer: GGGarth; Shawn Crahan; Steven Richards

40 Below Summer chronology
Rain (2000)	Invitation to the Dance (2001)	The Mourning After (2003)

Singles from Invitation to the Dance
- 1. "Falling Down" Released: October 23, 2001; 2. "Wither Away" Released: February 14, 2002; 3. "Power Tool" Released: April 23, 2002; 4. "Step Into the Sideshow" Released: August 13, 2002; 5. "Rope" Released: October 15, 2002; 6. "Smile Electric" Released: December 24, 2002

Invitation to the Dance is the second album by nu metal band 40 Below Summer. The album was released on October 16, 2001 via London-Sire Records. It is the band's first record to be put out on a major label. Two months after its release, the label went out of business, and the album was re-issued through Warner Music.

== Background and recording ==
The band originally formed in 1998. The only two constant members, vocalist Max Illidge and rhythm guitarist Joey D'Amico, first met each other during late 1997. 40 Below Summer had made a name for themselves by performing heavily across their native New Jersey and New York. In late 2000, the band's self-released CD Rain found its way to No Name Management (known for acts such as Slipknot and Mudvayne). Slipknot's Shawn Crahan came into contact with the CD through the head of Slipknot's street team in New York, who had connections to 40 Below Summer. For eight hours straight, Crahan had the CD on repeat in his car while driving from Iowa to Los Angeles (where No Name was based). After hearing Rain, Crahan pushed for 40 Below Summer to join No Name. 40 Below Summer had a manager showcase, with three management groups showing interest in them. They chose to partner with No Name, due to their association with Slipknot and Mudvayne. They believed that partnering with No Name would give them a better chance of touring with these bands, and that it could allow them to take on tours that those bands didn't want to do.

After joining No Name, numerous record label showcases on both coasts followed. It was reported that up to fifteen prominent labels expressed an interest in signing the band. Crahan would continue to help out 40 Below Summer during the period where they were weighing up offers from prospective labels. The band flew out to Los Angeles and showcased for Madonna's record label Maverick, which was part of Warner Music Group. The band were excited about the prospect of potentially joining Maverick, since it was the same label that the Deftones were on. In Los Angeles, they also showcased for Capitol Records. London-Sire were at the same showcase as Capitol, and the band decided to join them. London-Sire was another Warner-owned label, but was based in New York, unlike Maverick. In addition to this, No Name had a good relationship with the A&R at the label. At first, the band were given a larger offer to join Maverick, and had initially accepted it. The band were happy with the deal, but were trying to negotiate an extra small sum of money. Illidge states that it was "an additional 5%" and that it "wasn't big". Illidge grew up around the record industry in New York, and had experience dealing with labels, which is why he involved himself in the label negotiations for 40 Below Summer. They ended up not signing with Maverick as a result of Steven Richards, who was the head of No Name at the time. Richards tried to get Maverick to pay the band a significantly larger amount of money than they had originally asked for, with the label refusing. Illidge recalls that Maverick told them that "what you're asking for is absurd, this is a metal band. This isn't the Backstreet Boys, this isn't something that's guaranteed to go gold almost immediately."

In March 2001, 40 Below Summer travelled to Los Angeles again to commence recording their major label debut for London-Sire. The band had never been to California prior to joining No Name, with D'Amico recalling in 2021, "the vibe there was very relaxed, and we're from New York, so we thought everybody there was weird, we're like 'why are they so nice? why is everybody so happy?'".

40 Below Summer were given a recording budget of around 250,000 dollars, and made Invitation to the Dance with well-known rock and metal producer GGGarth (Rage Against the Machine, Mudvayne, Kittie). Despite also being credited as a producer, Crahan only contributed to the business workings of the band. After first being approached to produce, GGGarth listened to their independent releases. He enjoyed what the band was doing, subsequently saying that one of the main things that made him want to work with 40 Below Summer was Max Illidge, who he found to be a charismatic frontman. GGGarth was originally from Vancouver, Canada, and had production gear from the city driven over to the studio where 40 Below Summer was recording. Lead guitarist Jordan Plingos recalled in 2001 "I think the first thing that we clicked with Garth about was that he was relaxed. He wasn't like, 'let's go, guys, let's go!' He was more like, 'get comfortable, get settled in.' His whole thing is bringing out the best in you, so pressuring you to do something doesn't help. He was all about us, which was amazing." Max Illidge said in 2002 "he’s a lot of fun. He’s crazy too. Definitely a crazy little fucker, but he’s a lot of fun and a very talented guy. He definitely helped unlock some doors inside of me."

GGGarth was a user of marijuana at the time, and would make sure Illidge and other members of the band had access to the drug when they came to the studio, with the members often using it before recording their parts. D'Amico recalled that GGGarth thought he "played better" when he was high on marijuana. In spite of this drug use, Illidge claims that they came to the studio on time every day and didn't do much hard partying, like many other bands would at the time. D'Amico said in 2021, "we weren't doing hard drugs, we never were a band like that. We were never like into doing coke and shit like that. Drinking and pot were mainly our vices, and California at the time had the best weed in the planet, [so] we were smoking our brains out." As a result of their major label deal, the band had access to hundreds of thousands of dollars, which meant they were able to afford all the marijuana they were using.

During the making of the album, the band came into contact with well-known musicians. Illidge says he remembers spending nights smoking marijuana with Stephen Carpenter from Deftones and B-Real from Cypress Hill. Illidge was introduced to B-Real through Jim LaMarca of Chimaira. 40 Below Summer also came into contact with the band Flaw, who were making their major label debut Through the Eyes at the same studios. One of their members, Ryan Juhrs, later became part of 40 Below Summer. The two bands would check on the progress of each other's album, with D'Amico recalling that Flaw were surprised at how heavy 40 Below Summer was. They had initially believed them to be an emo band because of their name.

The album was mixed by veteran producer and engineer Toby Wright, who shared the same management as GGGarth. Initially, it was going to be mixed by another engineer, but they had to find someone else at the last minute. Wright didn't know of the band prior to taking on the project, and listened to their previous independent material in order to get a sense of their musical progression. Wright interviewed GGGarth and the band before mixing it, since he wanted to know what their "vision" for the record was. The band later said that they believed Wright's mixing helped make the record "sound huge". While the band were pleased with Wright's overall work, Illidge notes that Wright decided to digitally replace the drum tones on the record with his own drum samples, which Illidge disagreed with. Illidge said in 2021, "still to this day I wonder how the record would sound if he hadn't of done [that]." Wright said that the changing of the drums was just a "little enhancement", adding that only certain parts of the album had the drums replaced.

Howie Weinberg had originally been hired to master the album, however, the band didn't like the job he did mastering three of their songs, and decided to get Illidge's godfather Alan Silverman to master it instead. Silverman, who had previously worked on their independent releases, had always been their original choice to master the album. Illidge said in 2021 that, "Howie Weinberg mastered our record like it was every other metal record, which back then is just smash it to death, compress the shit out of it and then make it loud as hell, which in turn just gave us a distorted piece of crap. It just didn't sound good."

== Promotion, title and artwork ==
No conceptual music videos ended up being made to promote Invitation to the Dance, in part due to issues with the band's troubled label London-Sire. Despite being one of the heavier songs on the album, "Falling Down" received moderate airplay, leading to it initially being considered. Max Illidge stated in 2002 "We could have made a video for it and maybe if the video was shocking enough it would have given us a bigger push, but London-Sire just decided to scrap "Falling Down" and go with "Wither Away" for the video. I mean we were literally going to leave in like a few days to shoot the video for ‘Wither Away" — en route to LA — we had the plane tickets and the actresses schedules and just all that, and we were about three days away from the day of shooting and we got the phone call that we weren’t doing it and they were going to wait until early next year, but we knew that they were folding. We are not ever going to get that video." A live video for "Rope" was eventually created. Shortly before Invitation to the Dance was released, an electronic press kit for the album was also made, which shows the band members speaking to an actress playing a fortune teller.

The band only came up with the title Invitation to the Dance once they started recording the album in Los Angeles. The dance theme would be referenced again on 40 Below Summer's 2006 album The Last Dance, which was their final release before their initial breakup. The elderly man on the album cover also appeared in the 2000 music video for the 3 Doors Down song "Kryptonite." He is shown holding tarot cards, with the artwork concept being conceived by the band members and executed by Los Angeles-based t42design. The cover and booklet photography were shot in the Californian desert over the course of a single day.

== Music and influences ==
The album combines the downtuned riffs of nu metal/alternative metal with elements of New Jersey hardcore, hip hop, jazz and hard rock. Regarding the album's sound, Joey D'Amico remarked in September 2001 that "the music is definitely emotional, but its hardcore in its roots". Illidge and D'Amico both had parents who were musicians, and as such were influenced by a variety of non-rock musical styles growing up. The New York progressive band Candiria, which combined genres such as jazz, rap, R&B and metal, has been cited as a major influence by Illidge and D'Amico. D'Amico said in 2021 that they "had the attitude we had, we never stuck to a formula or said 'we have to write this type of song', it was just whatever we felt." D'Amico often went to see local bands from the New Jersey/New York hardcore scene such as Vision of Disorder, and was influenced by them. While the band dislikes being put into the nu metal category, D'Amico noted in 2021 they were also influenced by bands associated with the movement, including Korn, Slipknot, Sevendust, Incubus, early Deftones and Limp Bizkit's first album Three Dollar Bill, Y'all. Prior to discovering these bands, they were influenced by 90s alternative bands such as Soundgarden and The Smashing Pumpkins, as well as metal bands such as Iron Maiden, Def Leppard, Pantera, Exodus and Testament. D'Amico said in 2021, "you have forever to write your first album, so the influences can run really deep from when you first encounter music up into that point. Right before we made the record, I was listening to Glassjaw's first record non-stop. That was a huge influence on me and Max as well."

Max Illidge used techniques with his microphone to create natural tremolo effects on his voice, which can be heard on songs such as "Smile Electric". He would also do these techniques with his microphones during live performances, and said that Faith No More vocalist Mike Patton influenced him in doing this. Illidge adds that his melodies were "inspired from strange places", saying that some of them were influenced by 1980s Britpop music as well as the band Queensrÿche. Illidge considers "Wither Away" to be his favorite vocal performance on the album. The chorus to the song was written by Illidge in 1995, before he had formed 40 Below Summer. D'Amico later came up with guitar work that was inspired by Iron Maiden's "Wasted Years", and Illidge then went to his home studio and wrote the rest of the song around D'Amico's guitar parts. Illidge had a drum machine at his home studio and at a practice session the next day came to his band members with a nearly complete version of the song. This version of "Wither Away" was written shortly before 40 Below Summer was signed to London-Sire, when they were still in the process of doing showcases for labels.

Songs such as "Falling Down" and "Rejection" feature a volatile brand of singing which frequently alternates between melodic crooning, rapping and more extreme vocal stylings. Jordan Plingos stated in 2001 "If somebody asks me what this band sounds like, I say 'go listen to 'Falling Down,' because it has everything. It starts off fast and heavy and brutal, and then, from the bridge and chorus to the end, it makes you cry. That song right there covers it all." D'Amico said in 2021 that the changes in mood throughout songs such as "Falling Down" were inspired by The Smashing Pumpkins, who often had "dreamy" parts mixed with heavier moments. However, he notes that the band didn't intentionally set out to have contrasting soft parts in "Falling Down" when they first wrote the song.

"Step into the Sideshow", "Falling Down", "Rejection" and "Jonesin" were all rerecorded songs that originally appeared on the band's independent releases Side Show Freaks (1999) and Rain (2000). D'Amico stated in December 2001 "'Falling Down' is like the epitome of 40 Below Summer. There was no way that it wasn't going to make the album. 'Jonesin' is a sick twisted tale that we just wanted to tell. It's a true story. 'Sideshow' is like the anthem. It always gets the crowd going. 'Rejection'… I don't know. It's just a pretty heavy song so it made it." The song "Power Tool" was one of the earliest pieces of music written by the band. It was originally titled "Monica" (in reference to the 1998 Monica Lewinsky and Bill Clinton scandal) but had to be changed for legal reasons.

== Release ==
According to Max Illidge, the record has sold roughly 100,000 copies. He has noted that it is the only record in 40 Below Summer's discography which they do not control the rights to. Both this and the band's next album The Mourning After had limited releases overseas, with Invitation to the Dance also being released in countries such as Australia and Japan.

On April 11, 2025, it was released on vinyl for the first time by Music on Vinyl, under license from Warner.

== Reception ==
Professional ratings
Review scores
Source	Rating
AllMusic	4/5 stars
Chronicles of Chaos	3/10 stars
Rough Edge	2.5/5 stars

Allmusic's Jason D. Taylor gave the album a positive four-star review, noting that "Invitation to the Dance at first glance may seem to be just another hard rock album, but along with further observation it is apparent that 40 Below Summer is striving to spice up what modern hard rock became in the 21st century." He concluded his review by writing "40 Below Summer's ability to keep the listener guessing and the album's repetitive appeal make Invitation to the Dance a surefire hit for those looking for something more out of hard rock than a down-tuned bass and simplistic lyrics." In December 2001, Amber Authier of Canadian publication Exclaim! also gave Invitation to the Dance a positive review. She wrote, "this disc has all the trappings of a big monster metal record. Vocalist Max Illidge has a voice that is reminiscent of the master bands like Queensrÿche, but with a modern growl." Authier added, "don't get me wrong; this is a contemporary record that can hold its own in the company of bands like Slipknot and Korn, it just has that little something extra. Maybe it is the worldly influences of Peruvian drummer Carlos Aguilar and Puerto Rican bassist Hector Graziani."

Aaron McKay of extreme metal website Chronicles of Chaos had a more negative review. He gave it a 3 out of 10 in May 2003, writing that, "40 Below Summer is what I call radio metal. You know, Alien Ant Farm, Disturbed, Linkin Park and the like. Positively riddled from beginning to the welcome end with non-stop monotony like a mandatory week long insurance seminar." In 2015, VH1 ranked the album ninth on their list of "The 12 Most Underrated Nu Metal Albums".

== Track listing ==
All lyrics are written by 40 Below Summer; all music is composed by 40 Below Summer.

No.	Title	Length
1.	"We the People"	3:40
2.	"Rope"	4:21
3.	"Still Life"	3:02
4.	"Wither Away"	4:18
5.	"Step Into the Sideshow"	3:04
6.	"Falling Down"	4:27
7.	"Smile Electric"	2:59
8.	"Rejection"	4:09
9.	"Power Tool"	4:15
10.	"Drown"	4:30
11.	"Minus One"	2:36
12.	"Jonesin'"	4:43

== Personnel ==
=== 40 Below Summer ===
- Max Illidge – vocals
- Joey D'Amico – guitar
- Jordan Plingos – guitar
- Hector Graziani – bass
- Carlos Aguilar – drums, piano

=== Production ===
- Producer – GGGarth, M. Shawn Crahan, Steve Richards
- Engineer – Michael Baskette
- Mixing – Toby Wright at the Record Plant
- Second Engineer at Cello Studios – Alan Sanderson
- Second Engineer at Sound City Studios – Ben Mumphrey
- Production Coordinator – Chris Vaughan-Jones
- Digital Editing – Ben Kapplan
- Mastering – Alan Silverman at Arf! Digital NYC
- Photography – Dean Karr, M. Shawn Crahan, Stefan Seskis
- album art – t42design
