= Dead New World =

Studio album by Ill Niño
- Released: October 25, 2010
- Recorded: 2010 in New Jersey, New York
- Genre: Nu metal
- Length: 45:23
- Label: Victory
- Producers: Cristian Machado; Laz Pina; Dave Chavarri; Ahrue Luster; Sahaj Ticotin; Clint Lowery

Ill Niño chronology
Enigma (2008)	Dead New World (2010)	Epidemia (2012)

Singles from Dead New World
- 1. "Against the Wall" Released: October 12, 2010; 2. "Bleed Like You" Released: February 11, 2011

Dead New World is the fifth studio album by American heavy metal band Ill Niño. The album was released on October 25, 2010, through Victory Records. The album has less Latin-music influence than their previous work.

== Album information ==
The album was self-produced, with co-production coming from Clint Lowery (guitarist for Sevendust) and Sahaj Ticotin, and mixed by Eddie Wohl (36 Crazyfists, Anthrax, Smile Empty Soul). The album artwork was created by Tim Butler of XIII Designs (Disturbed, Slipknot, Metallica, Slayer, Michael Jackson).

This is their first album to be released from Victory Records and it is also their first album not to feature profanity.

On June 2, 2010, Ill Niño released a brand new track, "Scarred (My Prison)", as a teaser for the new album.

The first single "Against The Wall" was available October 12 for download and a video was filmed. This video was released on November 23.

The second single and music video "Bleed Like You" had its world premiere on February 11, while being featured in the 66th Episode of VicTorV (Victory Records TV), hosted by Ill Niño themselves.

== Reception ==
Professional ratings
Review scores
Source	Rating
AllMusic	3.5/5 stars
The Marshalltown Chronicle	5/5 stars
The NewReview	4.5/5 stars

The album sold around 3,000 copies in its first week and debuted at #164 on the US Billboard 200. However, the album briefly reached the top 20 of the rock album chart on iTunes.

== Track listing ==
No.	Title	Length
1.	"God Is for the Dead"	2:54
2.	"The Art of War"	4:09
3.	"Against the Wall"	3:27
4.	"Mi Revolucion"	3:50
5.	"Bleed Like You"	3:15
6.	"Serve the Grave"	3:20
7.	"If You Were Me"	3:41
8.	"Ritual"	4:33
9.	"Killing You, Killing Me"	3:52
10.	"How Could I Believe"	4:11
11.	"Bullet with Butterfly Wings" (The Smashing Pumpkins cover)	4:27
12.	"Scarred"	3:44
Total length:		45:23

== Personnel ==
Ill Niño

- Cristian Machado – vocals
- Dave Chavarri – drums
- Laz Pina – bass guitar
- Ahrue Luster – lead guitar
- Daniel Couto – percussion
- Diego Verduzco – guitars

Production

- Cristian Machado – producer and engineer (1, 2, 4, 6, 8–12), digital editing
- Laz Pina – producer and engineer (1, 2, 4, 6, 8–12), digital editing
- Dave Chavarri – producer and engineer (1, 2, 4, 6, 8–12), art direction
- Ahrue Luster – producer and engineer (1, 2, 4, 6, 8–12), digital editing
- Sahaj Ticotin – producer and engineer (3, 7), digital editing
- Clint Lowery – producer and engineer (5)
- Eddie Wohl – mixing, mastering
- Jamie "Muñeca" Muñoz – engineer, digital editing
- Paul Soroski – engineer
- Fabio Guerreiro – engineer
- Michael Morrissey – engineer and digital editing (12)
- Steve Lagudi – engineer
- Aaron Cloutier – assistant engineer
- Daniel Couto – assistant engineer
- Diego Verduzco – assistant engineer
- Mike Blanchard – digital editing
- Tim Butler – cover artwork
