= Ahrue Luster =

American guitarist

- Born: September 17, 1968 (age 58); Chicago, Illinois, U.S.
- Occupation: Guitarist
- Member of: Lions at the Gate
- Formerly of: Machine Head; Ill Nino

Ahrue Ilustre (born September 17, 1968), commonly known as Ahrue Luster, is an American guitarist. He is a current guitarist of heavy metal band Lions at the Gate and was the lead guitarist for Ill Niño. He is also a former guitarist for Machine Head, as well as Manmade God and a Bay Area thrash metal act called The Horde of Torment, who were originally called "Pestilence" but had to change their name because another Pestilence had signed to Roadrunner Records.

In 2015, Luster joined the horror metal band Terror Universal founded by Ill Niño drummer Dave Chavarri. He produced Motograter's second studio album, Desolation, which was released in August 2017. In September 2019, Nonpoint announced Luster would be their touring lead guitarist for their upcoming tour.

== Discography ==
=== Machine Head ===
- The Burning Red (1999)
- Supercharger (2001)
- Hellalive (2003)

=== Ill Niño ===
- Confession (2003)
- One Nation Underground (2005)
- The Under Cover Sessions (2006)
- Enigma (2008)
- Dead New World (2010)
- Epidemia (2012)
- Till Death, La Familia (2014)

=== Lions at the Gate ===
- The Excuses We Cannot Make (2023)

Preceded by Logan Mader	Machine Head lead guitarist 1998–2002	Succeeded by Phil Demmel

Preceded by Marc Rizzo	Ill Niño lead guitarist 2003–2019	Succeeded by Jess De Hoyos
