= Lions at the Gate =

American metal band

- Genres: Alternative metal; nu metal; groove metal
- Years active: 2021–present
- Spinoff of: Ill Niño
- Members: Cristian Machado; Ahrue Luster; Diego Verduzco; Josh Cuadra
- Past members: Fern Lemus; Stephen Brewer
- Website: latgofficial.com

Lions at the Gate is an American heavy metal band consisting of former Ill Niño members Diego Verduzco (guitar), Cristian Machado (vocals), and Ahrue Luster (guitar), as well as Josh Cuadra (drums). Their debut studio album, The Excuses We Cannot Make, was released on August 25, 2023

== History ==
Lions at the Gate was formed in 2021 by vocalist Cristian Machado, guitarists Ahrue Luster and Diego Verduzco. All three members left Ill Niño in 2019. They later recruited Westfield Massacre bassist Stephen Brewer and drummer Fern Lemus. Their first single, "Not Even Human", was released on June 4, 2021. They followed that up with the release of “Find My Way,” which featured Tatiana Shmayluk of the band Jinjer, along with a video on April 26, 2022.

== Band members ==
Current

- Cristian Machado – vocals (2021–present)
- Diego Verduzco – rhythm guitar (2021–present)
- Ahrue Luster – lead guitar (2021–present)
- Josh Cuadra – drums, percussion (2023–present)

Touring

- Mike Martin – bass (2025–present)

Former

- Fern Lemus – drums, percussion (2021–2023)
- Stephen Brewer – bass (2021–2025)

== Discography ==
Albums

- The Excuses We Cannot Make (2023)

Singles

Title	Year	Album
"Not Even Human"	2021	The Excuses We Cannot Make
"Scapegoat"	2021	The Excuses We Cannot Make
"Bed of Nails"	2022	The Excuses We Cannot Make
"Find My Way" (feat. Tatiana Shmailyuk of Jinjer)	2022	The Excuses We Cannot Make
"The Ledge"	2023	The Excuses We Cannot Make
"Drain"	2023	The Excuses We Cannot Make
"Silhouettes of Me"	2024	—N/a
"Burn the Candle"	2025	—N/a

=== Music videos ===
List of music videos, showing year released and director
Title	Year	Director(s)
"Not Even Human"	2021	Vicente Cordero / Industrialism Films
"Scapegoat"	2021	Vicente Cordero / Industrialism Films
"Bed of Nails"	2022	Vicente Cordero / Industrialism Films
"Find My Way" (feat. Tatiana Shmailyuk of Jinjer)	2022	Vicente Cordero / Industrialism Films
"The Ledge"	2023	Vicente Cordero / Industrialism Films
"Drain"	2023	Vicente Cordero / Industrialism Films
"Silhouettes of Me"	2024	—N/a
