= Element Eighty (album) =

Studio album by Element Eighty
- Released: October 28, 2003
- Studio: The Chop Shop, Hollywood, California
- Genre: Nu metal
- Length: 39:06
- Label: Universal, Republic
- Producer: Scott Humphrey

Element Eighty chronology
Mercuric (2001)	Element Eighty (2003)	The Bear (2005)

Element Eighty is the second studio album by the band Element Eighty, released on October 28, 2003 via Universal/Republic Records.

The track "Broken Promises" was included on the soundtrack of Need for Speed: Underground. A 2022 article highlighted the song, speaking highly of its fusion of alternative metal instrumentation with emo lyrics. Justin Bonitz of Tallah has stated that the song was his first introduction to music with extreme vocals.

== Track listing ==
All tracks are written by Element Eighty.

No.	Title	Length
1.	"Goodbye"	2:45
2.	"Bloodshot"	3:57
3.	"Broken Promises"	3:17
4.	"Texas Cries"	3:01
5.	"Parachute"	3:00
6.	"Dummy Block"	2:58
7.	"Scars (The Echo Song)"	4:58
8.	"Slackjaw"	3:21
9.	"Rabies"	3:18
10.	"Pancake Land"	2:51
11.	"Flatline"	3:56
12.	"Rubbertooth"	1:44
Total length:		39:06
