= Beyond the Calm of the Corridor =

Studio album by The Blank Theory
- Released: September 24, 2002
- Recorded: 2002
- Studio: Stratosphere Sound Studios (New York City, New York)
- Genre: Nu metal
- Length: 48:42
- Label: New Line
- Producer: James Iha, Adam Schlesinger

The Blank Theory chronology
Catalyst (2000)	Beyond the Calm of the Corridor (2002)

Professional ratings
Review scores
Source	Rating
AllMusic	4/5 stars

Beyond the Calm of the Corridor was the only album The Blank Theory released on New Line Records. It featured 13 tracks in total and was produced by Adam Schlesinger of Fountains of Wayne and Ivy fame. Co-Producer James Iha (Smashing Pumpkins), contributed his guitar works on "Killing Me". The album also features a cover of Portishead's "Sour Times". Some resources online include The Beatles' "Hey, Bulldog" listed as a 14th track as well.

The lead single, "Middle Of Nowhere", reached #36 on the US Mainstream Rock Tracks Chart. It was featured in the New Line Cinema film Final Destination 2 as well as appearing on the New Line Cinema film Freddy vs. Jason: The Original Motion Picture Soundtrack, both in 2003.

== Release ==
The album was released on New Line Records, the label of film studio New Line Cinema, a subsidiary of Time Warner. In early 2004, Time Warner's music division Warner Music Group was sold to a group of private investors, however, New Line Records remained with Time Warner, and the rights to the album currently belong with Time Warner's corporate successor Warner Bros. Discovery, rather than with Warner Music Group.

== Track listing ==
No.	Title	Length
1.	"Middle of Nowhere"	4:05
2.	"Addicted"	3:44
3.	"Father's Eyes"	3:09
4.	"Sour Times"	3:35
5.	"Killing Me"	4:04
6.	"Invisible"	3:07
7.	"Broken"	3:42
8.	"Thicker"	3:11
9.	"Back of My Mind"	3:30
10.	"Recluse"	4:08
11.	"Corporation"	3:14
12.	"Fear of God"	3:45
13.	"Martyr"	5:24
