= The Last Dance (40 Below Summer album) =

Studio album and DVD by 40 Below Summer
- Released: October 31, 2006
- Recorded: 2003–2005
- Genre: Nu metal; alternative metal
- Length: 37:37
- Label: Crash Music

40 Below Summer chronology
The Mourning After (2003)	The Last Dance (2006)	Fire at Zero Gravity (2013)

Professional ratings
Review scores
Source	Rating
Allmusic	2.5/5 stars

The Last Dance is the fourth studio album by the American nu metal band 40 Below Summer. It was released on October 31 (Halloween) 2006 via Crash Music. The single "Relapse" from the album had a video directed and produced by Frankie Nasso. The CD/DVD combo was released on October 31, 2006, via Crash Music Inc. The two-disc release features nine demo versions of songs intended for their third and final major LP, and a DVD with the band's "last" performance at the Starland Ballroom in New Jersey (September 2005).

== Track listing (album) ==
1. "New Age Slaves" – 3:47
2. "5 of a Kind" – 4:27
3. "Tell Me Now" – 4:20
4. "It's About Time" – 3:36
5. "Relapse" – 4:32
6. "Anxiety 101" – 4:07
7. "Alaskan Thunderfuck" – 5:10
8. "It's So Easy" (Guns N' Roses cover) – 3:11
9. "Cut in Half" – 4:23

== Track listing (DVD) ==
1. "Intro"
2. "Suck It Up"
3. "Rope" (Video)
4. "Wither Away"
5. "I'm So Ugly"
6. "Rope"
7. "Falling Down"
8. "Still Life"
9. "Jonesin'"
10. "Little Lover"
11. "A Season in Hell"
12. "Drown"
13. "Taxi Cab Confession"
14. "Self Medicate"
15. "Step Into the Sideshow"
16. "We the People/Credits"

"Falling Down", "Taxi Cab Confession", "Self Medicate" and "Step Into the Sideshow" were all recorded October 15, 2003 at the Quest club in Minneapolis. All other songs were recorded at the band's farewell gig at the Starland Ballroom.

== Personnel ==
=== 40 Below Summer ===
- Max Illidge – vocals
- Jordan Plingos – guitar
- Joey D'amico – guitar
- Hector Graziani – bass
- Ty Fury - guitar
- Carlos Aguilar – drums, piano

=== Production ===
- 40 Below Summer – production
- Max Illidge – recording, mixing, mastering
- Jester Diablo – album art
