= Revolution Revolución =

Studio album by Ill Niño
- Released: September 18, 2001
- Recorded: November 2000–February 2001
- Studio: Showplace Studios, Dover, New Jersey
- Genre: Nu metal; rap metal; Latin metal
- Length: 45:41
- Label: Roadrunner
- Producer: Dave Chavarri; Ill Niño (co.); Cristian Machado (add.); Steve Regina (add.); Rob Caggiano (add.); Eddie Wohl (add.)

Ill Niño chronology
| Ill Niño EP (2000) | Revolution Revolución (2001) | Confession (2003) |

Singles from Revolution Revolución
- 1. "God Save Us" Released: 2001; 2. "What Comes Around" Released: June 10, 2002; 3. "Unreal" Released: November 4, 2002

Professional ratings
Review scores
| Source | Rating |
|---|---|
| AllMusic | 3/5 stars |
| Collector's Guide to Heavy Metal | 7/10 |
| Drowned in Sound | 10/10 |
| Kerrang! | 4/5 stars |
| Metal.de | 8/10 |
| Q | 3/5 stars |
| Rock Hard | 9.5/10 |

Revolution Revolución is the debut album by the American heavy metal band Ill Niño. It has sold over 430,000 copies worldwide. It was the only album to feature guitarist Marc Rizzo, who left the band in 2003 to join Soulfly, and percussionist Roger Vasquez, who also left in 2003 and was replaced by Daniel Couto for the second album, Confession. The album was recorded from November 2000 to February 2001.

== Reception ==
Q magazine gave the album 3 stars out of 5 and said, "South American nu-metal with a strong Latin undercurrent... frontman Christian Marchado is equally adept at venting his spleen in English and Spanish." Allmusic gave the album 3 stars out of 5 and said, "This is an excellent debut for fans who lean more to the cerebral side of modern metallic endeavors."

== Track listing ==
All lyrics are written by Cristian Machado; all music is composed by Machado, Marc Rizzo, and Dave Chavarri.

| No. | Title | Length |
|---|---|---|
| 1. | "God Save Us" | 3:39 |
| 2. | "If You Still Hate Me" | 2:55 |
| 3. | "Unreal" | 3:33 |
| 4. | "Nothing's Clear" | 3:22 |
| 5. | "What Comes Around" | 3:46 |
| 6. | "Liar" | 3:31 |
| 7. | "Rumba" | 3:35 |
| 8. | "Predisposed" | 4:13 |
| 9. | "I Am Loco" | 3:30 |
| 10. | "No Murder" | 3:21 |
| 11. | "Rip Out Your Eyes" | 2:49 |
| 12. | "Revolution/Revolución" | 3:30 |
| 13. | "With You" | 3:57 |

Re-Release bonus tracks
| No. | Title | Length |
|---|---|---|
| 14. | "Fallen" | 3:38 |
| 15. | "Eye for an Eye" (Live @ Brixton, Soulfly cover) | 3:55 |
| 16. | "God Save Us" (Live @ Brixton) | 4:02 |
| 17. | "What Comes Around" (Spanish Version) | 3:46 |
| 18. | "Unreal" (Spanish Version) | 3:34 |

- The album was re-released on October 22, 2002. Two multimedia tracks were also included:
1. "What Comes Around" (Videoclip)
2. "Unreal" (Videoclip)

The track "Liar" is played in the credits of the game Ghost Recon Advanced Warfighter for the Xbox 360.

== Credits ==
=== Ill Niño ===
- Dave Chavarri ― drums
- Cristian Machado ― vocals
- Jardel Paisante ― guitar
- Lazaro Pina ― bass guitar
- Marc Rizzo ― guitar
- Roger Vasquez ― percussion

=== Additional musicians ===
- Omar Clavijo ― programming, samples
- DJ Skratch ― turntables
- Krztoff ― keyboards, synthesizers
- Mark Hunter ― additional vocals (track 15)

=== Production ===
- Dave Chavarri – producer, engineer, additional sample and scratch direction
- Ill Niño – co-producer
- Cristian Machado – additional production, additional sample and scratch direction
- Steve Regina – mixing, additional production
- Rob Caggiano – mixing, additional production
- Eddie Wohl – mixing, additional production
- Henri Martinez – assistant engineer
- Laz Pina – additional engineering
- Carl Nappa – digital editing, additional engineering
- Matt James – additional vocal production, additional digital editing
- George Marino – mastering

== Charts ==
Chart performance for "Revolution Revolución"
| Chart (2001) | Peak position |
|---|---|
| UK Albums (OCC) | 129 |
| UK Rock & Metal Albums (OCC) | 11 |
