= The Mourning After =

Studio album by 40 Below Summer
- Released: October 28, 2003
- Studio: Mirror Image Recorders, NYC
- Genre: Nu metal; alternative metal
- Length: 48:35
- Label: Razor & Tie
- Producer: David Bendeth

40 Below Summer chronology
Invitation to the Dance (2001)	The Mourning After (2003)	The Last Dance (2006)

Professional ratings
Review scores
Source	Rating
Allmusic	3/5 stars
Counterculture	4/5 stars
Rockezine	7/10 stars
Sputnikmusic	4/5 stars

The Mourning After is the third studio album by the American nu metal band 40 Below Summer. The album was released on October 28, 2003 via Razor & Tie Records. Two singles were released from the album in "Self Medicate" and "Taxi Cab Confession".

During promotion of the album, 40 Below Summer appeared on Headbangers Ball, and the video for "Self Medicate" found significant airplay and the song was featured on the soundtrack for the thriller film The Texas Chainsaw Massacre. This video features the group performing the song in a city park as well as various acts of indulgent "self medication" by townspeople (i.e. secretively buying pornography, gorging on food, making out). The following year, MTV2 held a fan's choice poll for the Best Metal Videos of 2004. The results aired on the December 25 edition of Headbangers Ball with "Self Medicate" ranking in at #18.

The CD is content and copy protected with MediaMax digital rights management software on it.

== Musical style ==
Joey D'amico, who played guitar on the album, stated "Before, we wanted to be really heavy, but we so wanted the music to be melodic, so we'd slap those parts right next to each other. Now we learned how to meld them together to create a sound."

== Reception ==
John D. Luerssen of Allmusic awarded The Mourning After three stars. He noted its more melodic approach, writing "while the band's forceful attack still won't land it in the pop survey, Bendeth's input does manage to give the band a foot up on other alternative metal acts in the run for airplay in the 'active rock' format." Luerssen also criticized the track "Breathless", stating that it "finds the outfit capably shifting into pop ballad mode à la Creed." He goes on to write "that momentary lapse in direction is soon corrected, however, and as The Mourning After unfolds, tracks like the cathartic 'F.E.' and the spooky 'A Season in Hell' right the wrongs for 40 Below Summer's ballooning headbanger clientele."

CMJ New Music Report gave the album a positive review in October 2003, and compared its sound to Machine Head, Spineshank and Killswitch Engage. They wrote that, "40 Below Summer got the shaft when its debut was released in 2001. Less than six months into the album cycle, the band's label (London) folded. Rather than bitch and moan about the unfortunate circumstances, however, the New Jersey act regrouped and wrote a better record." They add that, "songs like 'Self-Medicate' and 'Taxi Cab Confession' are undoubtably more memorable than some of the band's previous jump-and-sing-along anthems."

== Track listing ==
No.	Title	Length
1.	"Self Medicate"	3:13
2.	"Taxi Cab Confession"	3:21
3.	"Rain"	4:33
4.	"Breathless"	3:47
5.	"Better Life"	3:04
6.	"Monday Song"	3:46
7.	"F.E." (featuring Cristian Machado)	3:23
8.	"Awakening"	3:36
9.	"Alienation"	3:42
10.	"A Season in Hell"	16:18

Japanese Import
No.	Title	Length
11.	"Training Day"	3:38

- Track 10 contains the hidden track, "The Day I Died" beginning at 11:58.

== Personnel ==
=== 40 Below Summer ===
- Max Illidge – vocals
- Joey D'Amico – guitar
- Jordan Plingos – guitar
- Hector Graziani – bass
- Carlos Aguilar – drums, piano

=== Additional Musicians ===
- Christian Machado – vocals on "F.E."

=== Production ===
- David Bendeth – production, mixing
- UE Nastasi – mastering
- Dan Korneff – engineering, mixing on "Monday Song"
- John Bender – engineering
- Nick Cohen – engineering
- Amy V. Cooper – photography
- Dan Levine – album art layout
- Carlos Aguilar – album art layout
- Hector Graziani – album art layout
- Avery Singer – album art model
- Satyakam Saha – album art sculpture
