= Dan Korneff =

- Origin: U.S.
- Genres: Alternative rock; hard rock; post-hardcore; emo; pop-punk
- Occupations: Mixer; record producer; audio engineer; musician
- Instrument: Drums
- Years active: 2001–present

Dan Korneff is an American music producer, mixer, and engineer based in Long Island, New York. Former owner of House of Loud Studios, he has worked with several prominent rock bands, most notably Breaking Benjamin, Paramore, Papa Roach, Lamb of God and My Chemical Romance.

== Selected discography ==
Year	Artist	Title	Label	Role
2005	My Chemical Romance	Tony Hawk's American Wasteland	Vagrant	Mixer
2005	Lamb of God	Killadelphia	Epic	Digital Editing
2006	Hawthorne Heights	If Only You Were Lonely	Ferret Music	Radio Mix
2006	The Red Jumpsuit Apparatus	Don't You Fake It	Virgin	Engineer, Digital Editing
2006	Breaking Benjamin	Phobia	Hollywood	Engineer, Digital Editing
2006	Ima Robot	Monument to the Masses	Virgin	Engineer, Digital Editing, Mixing
2006	Ill Niño	The Best of Ill Niño	Roadrunner	Mixer
2006	Ill Niño	The Under Cover Sessions	Cement Shoes	Digital Editing
2007	The Almost	Southern Weather	Virgin	Mixer
2007	Paramore	Riot!	Atlantic	Explosions, engineer, Mixing, Digital Editing
2007	Chiodos	Bone Palace Ballet	Warner Bros.	Mixer
2007	Emery	I'm Only a Man	TNL	Mixer
2008	Ill Niño	Enigma	Cement Shoes	Digital Editing
2008	Hawk Nelson	Hawk Nelson Is My Friend	BEC Recordings	Engineer, Digital Editing, Mixing
2008	My Chemical Romance	The Black Parade Is Dead!	Reprise	Mixer
2008	Ill Niño	Roadkillers: Dir en Grey Selection	Roadrunner	Engineer, Mixer, Digital Editing
2008	Emery	While Broken Hearts Prevail	Tooth & Nail	Mixer
2009	Hedley	The Show Must Go	Universal Music Canada	Engineer, Digital Editing, Mixer, Keyboards, Programming
2009	Chiodos	Punk Goes Pop, Vol. 2	Fearless	Mixer
2009	Emery	...In Shallow Seas We Sail	Tooth & Nail	Mixer
2009	Cavo	Bright Nights Dark Days	Reprise	Engineer, Mixing, Digital Editing
2009	Breaking Benjamin	Dear Agony	Hollywood	Engineer, Mixing, Digital Editing
2009	Mayday Parade	Anywhere But Here	Fearless	Engineer, Digital Editing, Mixer
2010	Overkill	Ironbound	Koch	Digital Editing
2010	Emery	Are You Listening?	Tooth & Nail	Mixer
2010	Drowning Pool	Drowning Pool	Eleven Seven Music	Engineer, Mixer, Digital Editing, Programming, Drum Tech
2010	Our Last Night	We Will All Evolve	Epitaph	Mixing
2010	Hawk Nelson	Hawkology: A Hawk Nelson Anthology	CMJ	Engineer, Mixing, Digital Editing
2010	12 Stones	The Only Easy Day Was Yesterday	Wind-Up	Engineer, Mixing, Digital Editing
2010	Papa Roach	Time for Annihilation: On the Record and on the Road	Eleven Seven Music	Engineer, Mixing, Digital Editing
2010	The Pretty Reckless	Light Me Up	Interscope	Mixing
2010	All That Remains	For We Are Many	Razor & Tie	Mix Radio Single
2010	A Day to Remember	What Separates Me from You	Victory	Mixer
2010	Crystal Bowersox	Farmer's Daughter	Jive	Engineer, Mixing, Digital Editing, Drums
2011	Forever the Sickest Kids	Forever the Sickest Kids	Universal Motown	Engineer, Mixing, Digital Editing
2011	The Downtown Fiction	Let's Be Animals	Photo Finish	Mixer
2011	Breaking Benjamin	Shallow Bay: The Best of Breaking Benjamin	Hollywood	Engineer, Mixing, Digital Editing
2011	Lamb of God	Ashes of the Wake/Sacrament	Epic	Digital Editing
2011	Madina Lake	World War III	Razor & Tie	Mixer
2011	Mayday Parade	Mayday Parade	Fearless	Mixer
2011	Emery	Ten Years	Tooth & Nail	Mixer
2011	Four Year Strong	In Some Way, Shape or Form	Universal Republic	Engineer, Digital Editing, Mixing
2012	Anthony Green	Beautiful Things	Photo Finish	Mixing, Additional Production
2012	Cavo	Thick as Thieves	Eleven Seven Music	Producer, engineer, Mixer, arranger, Digital Engineer
2012	Overkill	The Electric Age	eOne	Digital Editing
2012	Evans Blue	Graveyard of Empires	Self-released	Mixer
2012	Pierce the Veil	Collide with the Sky	Fearless	Producer, Mixer, engineer, Digital Editing
2012	Our Last Night	Age of Ignorance	Epitaph	Engineer, Digital Editing, Mixing
2013	Pierce the Veil	Selfish Machines (Re-issue)	Equal Vision	Mixer
2013	Louna	Behind a Mask	Red Decade Records	Mixer
2013	Tonight Alive	The Other Side	Fearless	Mixer
2013	Dayshell	Dayshell	Sumerian	Producer, Mixer, engineer, Digital Editing
2013	Sleeping with Sirens	Feel	Rise Records	Mixer
2013	Drowning Pool	Resilience	Eleven Seven Music	Mixer
2013	The Devil Wears Prada	8:18	Roadrunner Records	Mixer
2013	Our Last Night	Oak Island	Self-released	Drum engineer
2014	Crown the Empire	The Resistance: Rise of The Runaways	Rise Records	Producer
2014	The Word Alive	Real	Fearless Records	Mixer
2014	Motionless in White	Reincarnate	Fearless Records	Producer
2014	佛跳牆 Buddha Jump	給你看	Neverfall Inc.	Mixer
2015	The Devil Wears Prada	Space	Rise Records	Producer, engineer
2016	Pierce the Veil	Misadventures	Fearless Records	Producer
2016	The Color Morale	Desolate Divine	Fearless Records	Producer, Mixer, Programming
2016	The Devil Wears Prada	Transit Blues	Rise Records	Producer, Engineer, Mixer
2024	Pierce the Veil	Karma Police	Fearless Records	Producer
