= 40 Below Summer =

American nu metal band

- Also known as: 6 Degrees of Degradation (1998), Mid-Green Pimp Machine (1998), Urethra Franklin (1998)
- Origin: New Jersey/New York, U.S.
- Genres: Nu metal; alternative metal; hard rock
- Years active: 1998–2005; 2006; 2010; 2011–present
- Labels: Crash; Razor & Tie; London-Sire; Warner Bros./Reprise; Super Massive
- Members: Max Illidge; Joey D'Amico; Anthony Devizio; Robi Kirsic; Anthony Bordonaro
- Past members: Peter Savad; Carlos Aguilar; Steve Ferreira; Jordan Plingos; Hector Graziani; Ty Fury; Ryan Jurhs; Ali Nassar; Derrick Klybish; Tom McNamara; David Mondragon
- Website: 40belowsummer.tumblr.com

40 Below Summer is an American nu metal band from New Jersey. Formed in 1998, the band broke up seven years later in 2005. After two small reunions in 2006 and 2010, they permanently reformed in 2011. Their latest album, Untethered, was released in 2025.

== History ==
=== Beginnings (1998–2000) ===
40 Below Summer came together after drummer and Peruvian native Carlos Aguilar met singer Max Illidge in a band named Alien. Joey D'Amico met Max Illidge in late 1997, and later joined the duo playing guitar. Pete Savad joined soon after playing bass at first, then moving to guitar with the addition of Jordan Plingos on bass. The self-released Side Show Freaks (1999) was recorded with these lineups at their rehearsal location in the Music Building, NYC. Savad left the band as they got close to signing their first record deal. Moving Plingos to guitar, the band added Steve Ferreira who was soon replaced by Puerto Rican-born Hector Graziani on bass. Soon after, Rain (2000) was self-released.

=== Invitation to the Dance (2001–2002) ===
In late 2000, the band's self-released CD Side Show Freaks found its way to No Name Management (known for acts such as Slipknot and Mudvayne). After partnering with No Name, numerous record label showcases on both coasts followed, with up to fifteen prominent labels showing interest in the band. They eventually signed with Warner Music Group's London-Sire, although at one point they were close to signing with Madonna's Maverick Records, another Warner label. In March 2001, 40 Below Summer travelled to Los Angeles to commence recording their major label debut Invitation to the Dance with famed heavy metal producer GGGarth (Rage Against the Machine, Mudvayne, Kittie). Prior to the album's release, the band embarked on a poorly attended tour with Chimaira and Ill Niño that was headlined by Factory 81. After several delays, Invitation to the Dance was eventually released on October 16, 2001 (some sources state September 11, 2001).

Two months after its release, London-Sire went out of business due to a corporate merger. This led to the band being briefly signed to parent label Warner Bros. Records during 2002. Reprise/Warner Bros. subsequently re-issued Invitation to the Dance, although the band elected to leave the label in December 2002. Regarding their departure, Max Illidge stated "The label [London-Sire] folded. which essentially meant all our funding was cut. But we couldn't go sign another deal, because Warner Brothers owned London-Sire so Warner Brothers owned our contract. They didn't even know who the fuck we were. They folded a lot of other labels too. For literally like a year they had to sift through probably a thousand different acts that were on all these labels and say 'keep them, dump them'. We were like playing phone tag talking to this guy and that guy for like a year before we finally just said please let us go."

After performing on the Jägermeister Music Tour with Drowning Pool, Coal Chamber and Ill Niño, they started to write material for their second album. While the band started writing almost immediately after the release of their previous album, they threw out some fifteen songs before coming up with 21 that they reduced down to the final ten (plus a bonus track, "The Day I Died").

=== The Mourning After (2003–2005) ===
Unsigned at this point, Razor & Tie Records saw the band in February 2003 when they played in New York City with E.Town Concrete. A deal was signed in June just as the band entered the studio. The band would later strike a licensing deal with Roadrunner Records for the album's UK release.

Their second album The Mourning After was released on October 28, 2003. Two singles were released from the album in "Self-Medicate" and "Taxi Cab Confession". The video for the former received a fair amount of airplay on MTV2's Headbangers Ball. The band negotiated a release from their contract in 2004. Illidge stated "We had trouble with Razor & Tie. They really had no experience at the time putting out rock albums. They were known for like kids pop, shit like that. They just didn't know what they were doing, they had no clue. That shit was doomed. We ended up actually getting the rights to Mourning After, and we got a little money out of the deal." Not long after this Jordan was temporarily replaced by Ty Fury. The band then recruited Ryan Juhrs (formerly of Flaw) to fill the spot officially and Carlos left soon after.

=== The Last Dance (2006) ===
Despite breaking up, 40 Below Summer released The Last Dance on October 31, 2006, via Crash Music Inc. The album features nine demo versions of songs intended for their third LP, as well as a bonus DVD featuring footage of the band's "last" performance at the Starland Ballroom in New Jersey (September 2005). The album sold 1,095 copies during its first week of release, according to Nielsen SoundScan.

In October 2006, there was speculation that the band had reunited. This was later dismissed by guitarist Joey D'Amico who stated that the band was just going to do a few shows to promote the release of The Last Dance. However, D'Amico also stated that there was a possibility that 40 Below Summer would record a new album in the future.

The band filmed a music video for the single "Relapse" with director Frankie Nasso. The song was originally written by 2005 guitarist Ty Fyhrie (Fury). Ty Fyhrie also played the 2nd guitar parts on "The Last Dance." Ty went on to work with the bands Murder Of Crows, Dirty Little Rabbits, FOMOFUIAB and Trapt.

In a radio interview with All Knowing Force, Illidge stated that he expected 40 Below Summer would tour and play 5-10 shows a year. Although his main priority was with his new project Black Market Hero, he didn't rule out the possibility of the band one day recording another album.

The band did however re-issue their independently released EP Rain on July 31, 2007, via Crash Music. In addition to the five songs originally released, seven demo tracks were also included, as well as all new cover artwork. Sideshow Freaks was also re-released on July 15, 2008, by ex-Korn guitarist Brian "Head" Welch's record label Driven Music Group.

=== Break-up (2006–2010) ===
Ali Nassar replaced Carlos, and after playing two shows under the 40 Below Summer moniker, they decided to rename the project Black Market Hero. They were soon joined by 2 members of Flaw, drummer Micah Havertape and Ryan Jurhs. In January 2006, Graziani was forced to leave the band due to severe hearing loss he had suffered after years of performing. Former Confliction bassist Matt Fortin joined in August 2006. In 2008, guitar virtuoso Angel Vivaldi replaced Ryan as their permanent lead guitarist and quickly began to write fresh material for a full-length record. Black Market Hero's first single, "Freedom Dealer," was released in summer 2007.

With Daggers Drawn was the newest project consisting of former members of 40 Below Summer. Angel Vivaldi performed live in With Daggers Drawn while actively in Black Market Hero during most of 2009. This was before the addition of Joey D'Amico and Max Illidge at which point he delved further into his solo instrumental career. With Daggers Drawn consisted of Max Illidge, Joey D'Amico, Ed Schiro, Tommy Costello, and Greg Telfeian.

Despite 40 Below Summer's status of being broken up at this time, Max would occasionally reunite the band to play shows at the Starland Ballroom. These shows were done as a way to draw attention to his other projects, as well as projects by friends and significant others of his (all of whom would open these "one-off" shows).

=== Reformation and Fire at Zero Gravity (2011–2014) ===
On July 12, 2010, it was announced that 40 Below Summer would play a reunion show on Saturday, October 2, 2010, at Starland Ballroom in New Jersey. God Forbid and With Daggers Drawn played support. 40 Below played "Invitation to the Dance" from cover-to-cover.

On February 27, 2012, it was announced that Max and Joey had parted ways with the project With Daggers Drawn. Soon after, the other members of the group disbanded to form rock band Pralaya, while Max and Joey returned to focusing on 40 Below Summer.

On April 3, 2012, Max Illidge posted a track list for an upcoming album entitled Fire at Zero Gravity on the band's Facebook. He also stated that "this album will f**k you sideways". It was announced on June 12, 2012, that Joey D'Amico would play drums instead of Carlos Aguilar. Prior to the release of the album, the band released two songs, "Bottom Feeder" and "My Name Is Vengeance" for free download. On December 1, 2012, 40 Below Summer was scheduled to perform an album release show at Starland Ballroom, although it was canceled due to damage to the venue from Hurricane Sandy. Fire at Zero Gravity was officially released on April 30, 2013, via Super Massive Music Group. Derrick Klybish and Anthony Devizio were confirmed as the new bassist and drummer respectively. In 2013, Illidge stated "Our goal is to just make music. We have fans. Because you don't need a record label anymore, we can keep making music for a long time."

=== Transmission Infrared (2015–2022) ===
In February 2015, the band announced on Facebook that they were recording a new album. The production of the album was mostly funded by a crowdfunding campaign. On August 31, 2016, the band premiered a music video for the song "Snake Charmer," which is included on Transmission Infrared and is one of the three songs streamed prior to the album's release. In September 2017, the band parted ways with bassist Derrick Klybish and recruited Scare Don't Fear and Beyond Visible guitarist Tom McNamara as their new bass player. McNamara played his first shows with the band in October 2017. Derrick Klybish died on November 11, 2020. He was 39 years old.

=== Untethered (2023–present) ===
It was reported in December 2023 that the band had begun recording 11 songs for a new album, with the vocal work to be completed the following year. Their 1st song since 2016, "King Ghidorah", was released on May 23, 2025. The band are planning to do an anniversary show for October 2025, which will include the current lineup and the circa 2000 lineup which consists of Illidge and D'Amico, along with former members Aguilar, Plingos and Graziani. The band would also announce the addition of Robi Kirsic on bass.

On September 29, 2025, the band announced their seventh album, Untethered, would be released on October 10.

On April 18, 2026, the band announced on their socials that Mondragon left the band to focus on his guitar duties with E.Town Concrete, Anthony Bordonaro took over as their new guitarist.

== Musical style and influences ==
Although the band are frequently labeled a nu metal band, vocalist Max Illidge (in an interview) insisted otherwise and describes 40 Below Summer as an "aggressive rock band" which "explores a little bit of everything." 40 Below Summer's influences include Tool, Incubus, The Smashing Pumpkins, Deftones, Led Zeppelin, Monster Magnet, Alice in Chains, Yngwie Malmsteen, Candiria, Faith No More and Soundgarden.

== Members ==
Current

- Max Illidge – vocals (1998–2005, 2006, 2010, 2011–present)
- Joey D'Amico – rhythm guitar (1998–2005, 2006, 2010, 2011–present)
- Anthony Devizio – drums (2012–present)
- Robi Kirsic – bass (2025–present)
- Anthony Bordonaro – lead guitar (2026–present)

Former

- Peter Savad – bass guitar (1998), guitar (1998–2000)
- Carlos Aguilar – drums (1998–2005, 2006, 2010, guest 2025)
- Steve Ferreira – bass guitar (2000)
- Jordan Plingos – lead guitar (2000–2004, 2006, 2010, 2011–2014, guest 2025), bass guitar (1998–2000)
- Hector Graziani – bass guitar (2000–2005, 2006, 2010, guest 2025)
- Ty Fury – lead guitar (2004–2005)
- Ryan Jurhs – lead guitar (2005, 2006, 2010)
- Ali Nassar – drums (2005)
- Derrick Klybish – bass guitar (2012–2017, died in 2020)
- Tom McNamara – bass guitar (2017–2019)
- David Mondragon – lead guitar (2014–2026), bass guitar (2019–2025)

Timeline

== Discography ==
=== Studio albums ===
- Side Show Freaks (1999)
- Invitation to the Dance (2001)
- The Mourning After (2003)
- The Last Dance (2006)
- Fire at Zero Gravity (2013)
- Transmission Infrared (2015)
- Untethered (2025)

=== EPs ===
- Rain (2000)

=== Videography ===
Year	Song
2001	"Invitation to the Dance EPK"
2001	"Wither Away" [Cancelled]
2002	"Rope" (live)
2003	"Self Medicate"
2004	"Taxi Cab Confession"
2007	"Relapse"
2016	"Snake Charmer"
2025	"King Ghidorah"
2025	"Darkside"
