= Latin metal =

Genre of heavy metal with Latin music themes

- Stylistic origins: Heavy metal; Pop rock; Latin rock; Latin music; rock en español; Brazilian rock; Latin American music; Spanish rock; World music; Latin jazz
- Cultural origins: Late 1970s, Latin America

Other topics
- Folk metal; Latin alternative; Latin rock; Brazilian thrash metal

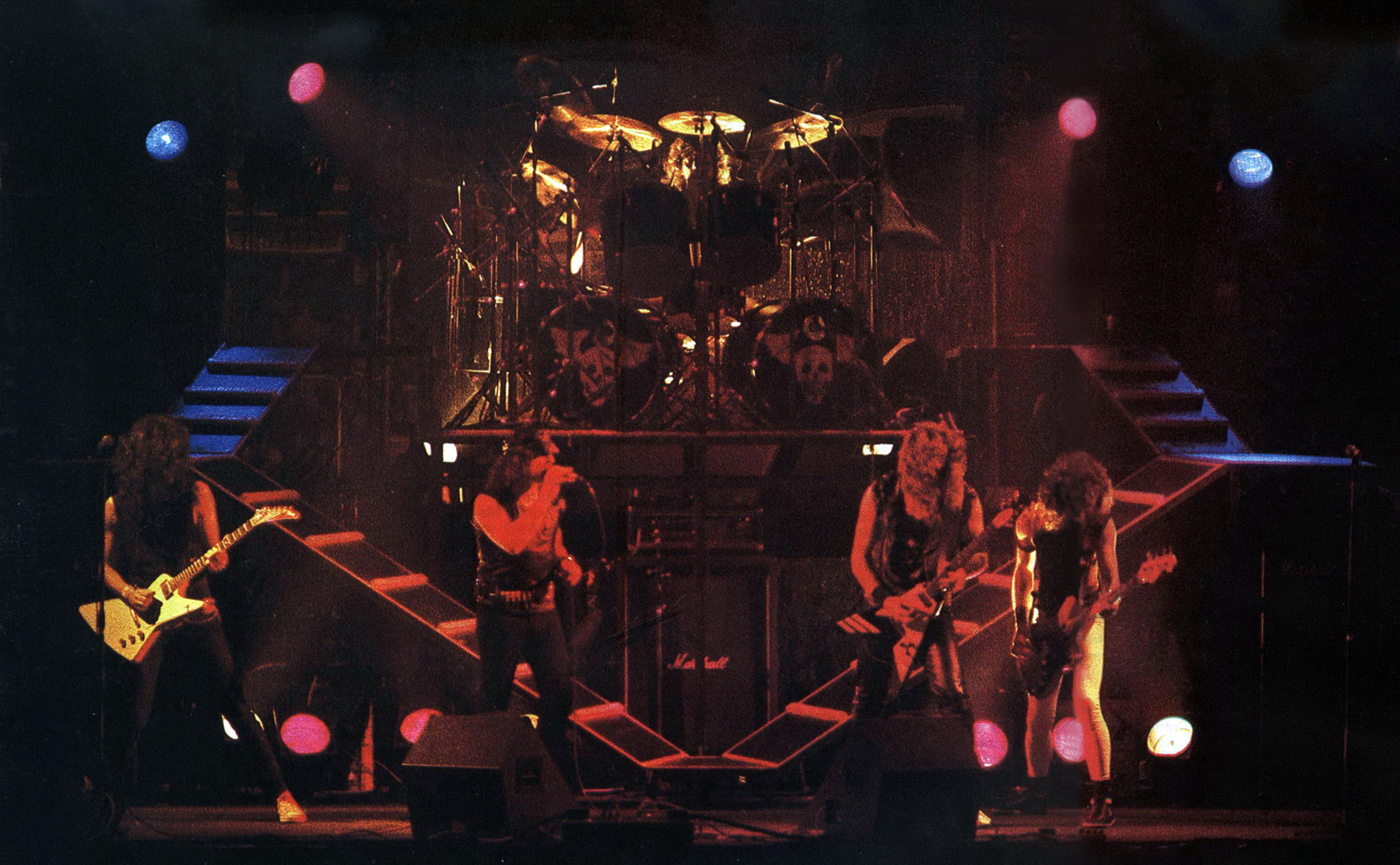
Angeles del Infierno 1st Lineup - Manu, Juan, Iñaki, Robert and Santi on stage in Madrid 1985

Latin metal (Spanish: metal latino, Portuguese: metal latino-americano) is a subgenre of heavy metal music with Latin origins, influences, and instrumentation, such as Spanish or Portuguese vocals, Latin percussion and rhythm such as salsa rhythm. Some South American bands also add influences and instrumentations borrowed from world music and ethnic music, relating to musical traditions of the indigenous people of America.

== History ==
An early mention of the term comes from critic Robert Christgau, who referred to Carlos Santana's music from the 1970s as "Latin-metal pop," making it a possible forerunner in the genre.

Latin metal started in the 1970s and 1980s, originating in many countries of Latin America, thanks to the increasing worldwide popularity of heavy metal and heavy rock from Europe (obviously including Spain, with bands such as Baron Rojo and Angeles del Infierno singing in Spanish and reaching international success in the 1980s) and United States, with Argentina having an important scene as well (Rata Blanca, V8). It may also have profited from the "Latin explosion" in the United States of the 1990s, though some critics contend that the gap between Ricky Martin-style pop and metal is too great for Latin metal to have profited greatly. Still, record companies in the 1990s sought to profit from the rise of Latin pop, as evidenced from the Metalo compilation of Latin metal bands by the Grita! Records label, which included songs by Ill Niño and Puya, and bands from the 1990s such as Sepultura and Soulfly are cited as predecessors in the genre. In the United States, Ill Niño is probably the best-known exponent of the genre; their first two albums (with "philosophical and bilingual lyrics" about such topics as growing up fatherless) were commercially successful and got them strong radio play in for instance the San Antonio area.

== Latin metal bands ==
=== Argentina ===
- A.N.I.M.A.L.

=== Gibraltar ===
- Breed 77

=== Mexico ===
- Acrania

=== United States ===
- Ankla
- Brujeria - A death metal band from Los Angeles.
- Ill Niño - A heavy metal band from New Jersey whose 2001 debut album Revolution Revolución was seminal in the development of the genre.
- Marc Rizzo

==== Puerto Rico ====
- Puya
