= Dave Chavarri =

Peruvian drummer

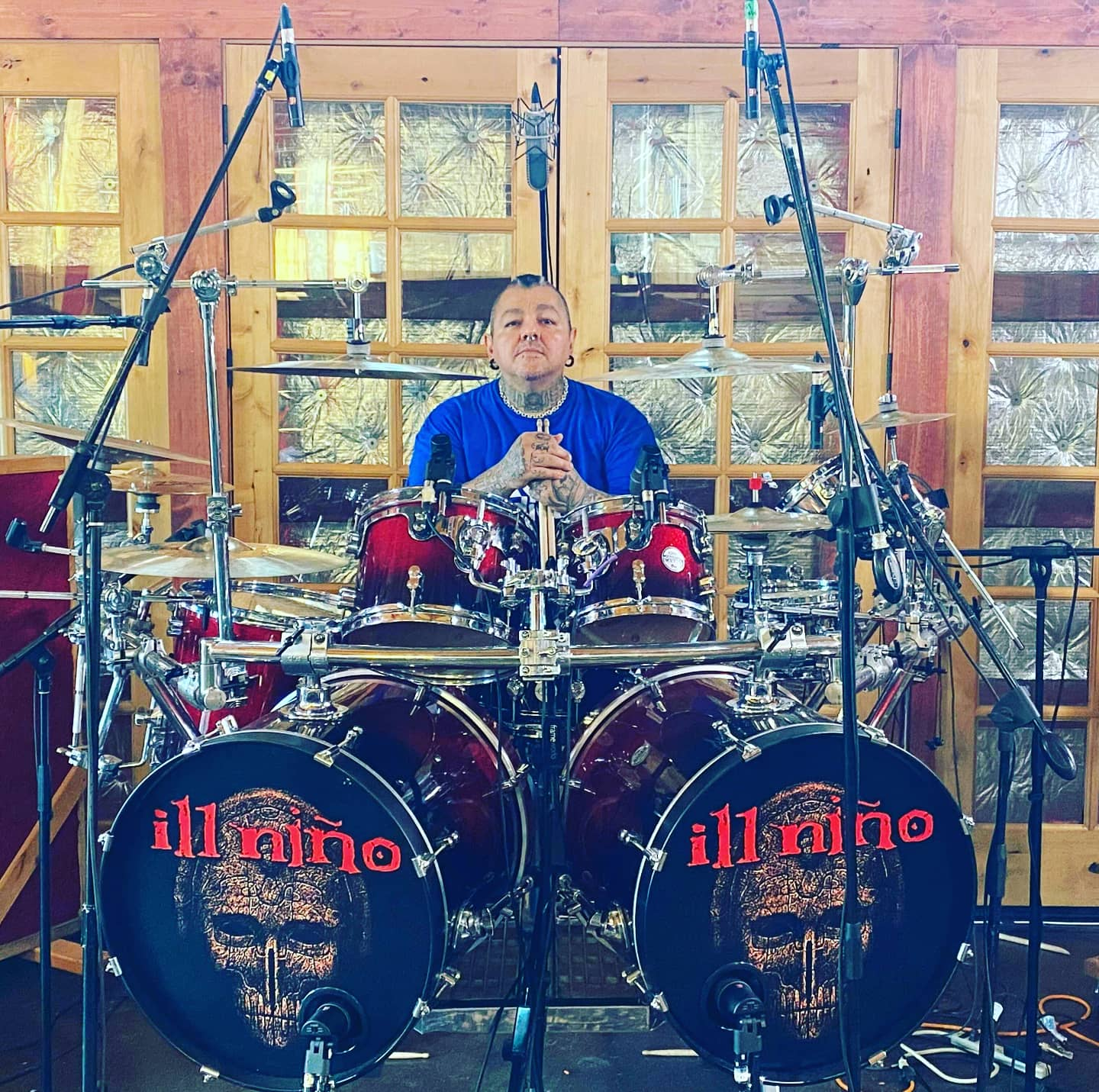
- Chavarri in 2021

Background information
- Born: 1967 (age 58–59); Lima, Peru
- Origin: New Jersey, U.S.
- Genres: Heavy metal; nu metal; Latin metal
- Occupations: Musician; songwriter; producer; manager
- Instrument: Drums
- Member of: Ill Niño; Terror Universal
- Formerly of: Pro-Pain; M.O.D.; Merauder; Lȧȧz Rockit; Gothic Slam

Dave Chavarri (born 1967) is a Peruvian American musician and the founder, producer, manager, and drummer for the metal bands Ill Niño and Terror Universal. He is also the former drummer for Pro-Pain, M.O.D., Merauder, Lȧȧz Rockit, and Gothic Slam. He is the owner of entertainment company C.I.A Management, whose roster includes Ill Niño, Terror Universal, and others.

== Early life ==
Chavarri was born in Lima, Peru. In 1976, when he was 9 years old, he and his family moved to New Jersey after his father, an American citizen, petitioned for the rest of his family to immigrate.

== Musical career ==
Chavarri recorded his first record at 17 years old.

Since 2000, he has produced many bands including Ill Niño, Terror Universal, Exilia, Broom Hellda, May The Silence Fail, Violent Delight. Chavarri has worked with producers such as Jay Baumgardner, Ron Saint Germain and Bob Marlette.

Chavarri has performed globally with such acts as Ozzy Osbourne, Disturbed, Godsmack, Sevendust, System of a Down, P.O.D. and Slayer.

In 2015, Chavarri formed heavy metal band Terror Universal.

Chavarri has been in magazines such as Modern Drummer, Drums, Metal Edge, R.I.P., Kerrang, Metal Hammer, and Circus.

Chavarri rents tour busses to touring artists. Zheani, who rented from Chavarri’s company, had many issues with the bus and claimed to have been scammed by Chavarri. This is the only time a claim like this has been made about Chavarri’s buses.

=== Ill Niño ===
Ill Niño's debut album Revolution Revolución was released on September 18, 2001, and was produced and engineered by Chavarri.

Ill Niño was formed by Chavarri and is very meaningful to him. Chavarri credits the music Ill Niño wrote for the Freddy vs. Jason film as what made the band initially take off in the Nu Metal scene.

== Personal life ==
Chavarri has strong beliefs about how the music business runs, having said “You have to be prepared to get fucked,” referring to becoming an artist. For him, this meant being evicted from several homes and having his car repossessed during his career. Chavarri also claims that a strong work ethic is an important part of achieving success in music.

Despite tensions between Chavarri and Christian Machado since Machado’s departure from Ill Niño and the ensuing legal battle, Chavarri says the two are friends. He says the same about Marcos Leal, another former Ill Niño vocalist. Chavarri says he tries to stay positive about things, which is reflected in his current relationships with former band members.

== Discography ==
- Nothing'$ $acred with Lȧȧz Rockit (1991, Roadrunner Records)
- Devolution with M.O.D. (1994, Music for Nations/Blackout)
- Pro-Pain with Pro-Pain (1998)
- Revolution Revolución with Ill Niño (2001, Roadrunner/Universal)
- Confession with Ill Niño (2003, Roadrunner/Universal)
- One Nation Underground with Ill Niño (2005, Roadrunner/Universal)
- Enigma with Ill Niño (2008, Cement Shoes)
- Dead New World with Ill Niño (2010, Victory)
- Epidemia with Ill Niño (2012, Victory)
- Till Death, La Familia with Ill Niño (2014, Victory)
- Make Them Bleed with Terror Universal (2018)
