= Ill Niño =

Latin American metal band

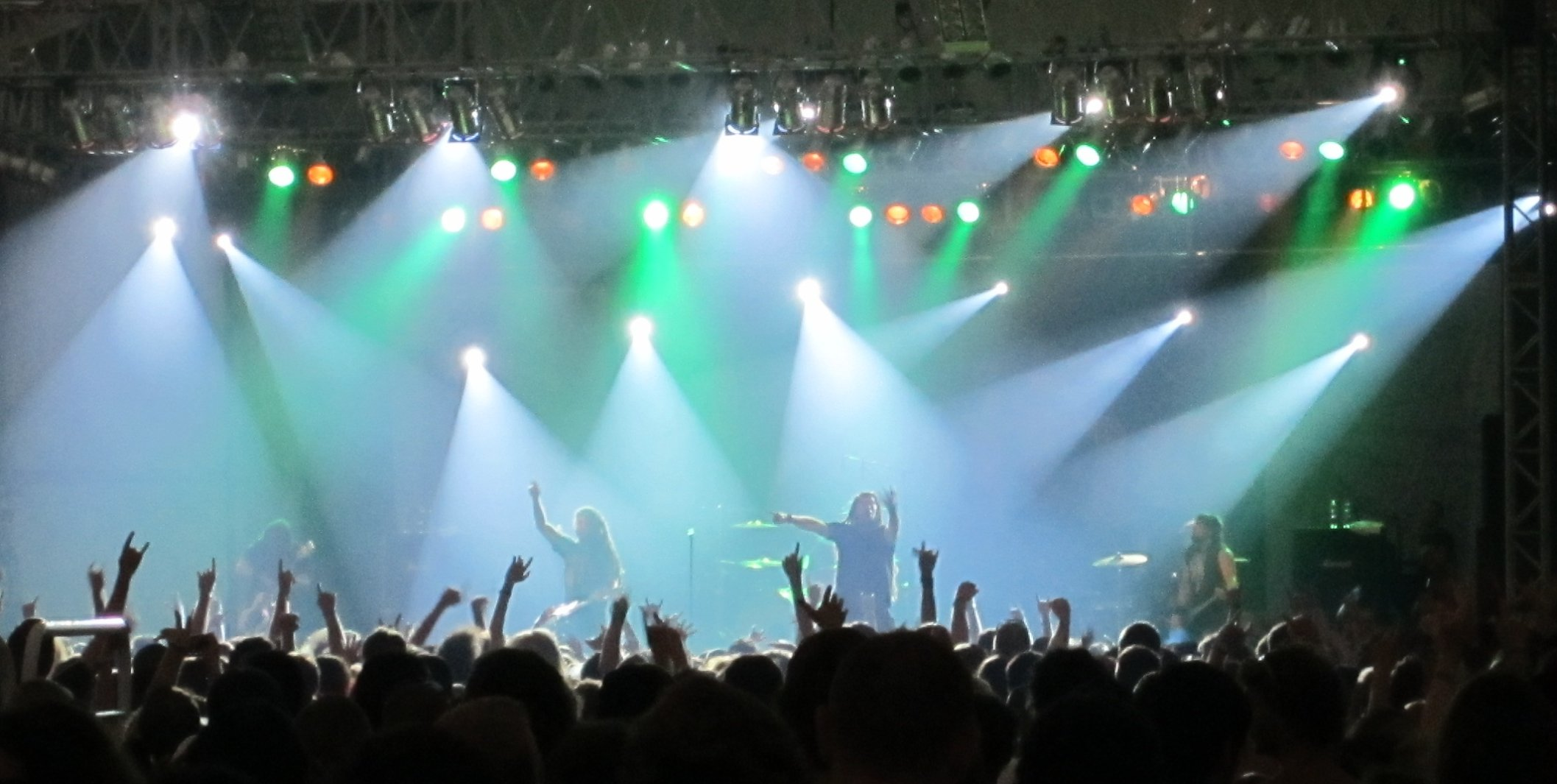
- Ill Niño in 2010

Background information
- Also known as: El Niño (1998–1999)
- Origin: Union City, New Jersey, U.S.
- Genres: Latin metal; nu metal; alternative metal; metalcore
- Years active: 1998–present
- Labels: Bleeding Nose; Victory; Cement Shoes; Roadrunner
- Spinoffs: Lions at the Gate
- Members: Tommy Roulette III; Dave Chavarri; Lazaro Pina; Daniel Couto; Sal Dominguez; Jes De Hoyos; Miggy Sanchez
- Past members: Daniel Gomez; Jorge Rosado; Marc Rizzo; Scott Roberts; Derek Sykes; Roger Vasquez; Jardel Martins Paisante; Cristian Machado; Omar Clavijo; Ahrue Luster; Diego Verduzco; Oscar Santiago; Marcos Leal; Xander Raymond Charles

Ill Niño (Spanglish wordplay meaning "ill child"; stylized as ill niño) is a Latin American nu metal band formed in Union City, New Jersey, in 1998 by drummer Dave Chavarri, who remains the band's sole original member. They have released seven studio albums, two EPs, and one compilation album, with total worldwide album sales exceeding 1.3 million.

== History ==
=== Early career (1998–2000) ===
Ill Niño was formed as El Niño by former Pro-Pain drummer David "Dave" Chavarri in May 1998. He enlisted Merauder vocalist Jorge Rosado, guitarist Daniel Gomez, and bassist Christian Machado, taking on the role of drummer and percussionist himself. With this lineup, the band released a self-titled EP.

Gomez left the band soon after the EP's release, with various guitarists filling his spot. Among them were future full-time member Marc Rizzo, Scott Roberts of Biohazard, and Derek Sykes of Demolition Hammer. Sykes also appears on the compilation album Métalo, released by Grita! Records in June 1999. By April 1999, the band had already renamed to Ill Niño.

When Chavarri took over Roy Mayorga's duties in Soulfly on the Bring Da Shit Tour in July 1999, Ill Niño was briefly put on hold. After he returned from tour, Chavarri decided to reform the band with a revamped lineup: Machado switched from bass to lead vocals, and the two were joined by guitarists Marc Rizzo and Jardel Paisante, bassist Lazaro Pina, and Roger Vasquez on additional percussion. They gained exposure through New Jersey metal college radio station WSOU, played the World Series of Metal festival in Ohio, and the following year opened for bands like Kittie, Soulfly, and Snapcase. They also released a self-titled EP and were signed by Roadrunner Records in June 2000. With financial support secured, recording for their debut album began in November 2000.

=== Mainstream success (2001–2019) ===
On September 18, 2001, Ill Niño released their debut album, Revolution Revolución. The album sold over 350,000 copies worldwide within the first two years of its release. In early 2003, just before Ill Niño was set to record their follow-up, the band parted ways with guitarist Marc Rizzo and percussionist Roger Vasquez. Confession was recorded in mid-2003 and released on September 30, 2003. It debuted at No. 37 on the Billboard 200 with first-week sales of 27,863. The lead single, "How Can I Live," was their first to break into the Billboard charts, peaking at No. 26 on the Mainstream Rock chart.

The band's third effort, One Nation Underground, was released on September 27, 2005, and debuted at No. 101 on the Billboard 200 chart. On July 15, 2006, Ill Niño parted ways with Roadrunner Records and guitarist Jardel Paisante. Just a week later, they signed a new deal with the recently formed Cement Shoes Records. Roadrunner released The Best of Ill Niño on September 12, 2006, as a contractual obligation to the label and without the band's consent or involvement.

Through Cement Shoes Records, they released The Under Cover Sessions, an EP featuring three covers and two new songs, and Enigma, their fourth studio album, released in 2008 after multiple delays. The album sold 5,000 copies in the United States during its first week of release and debuted at No. 145 on the Billboard 200 chart.

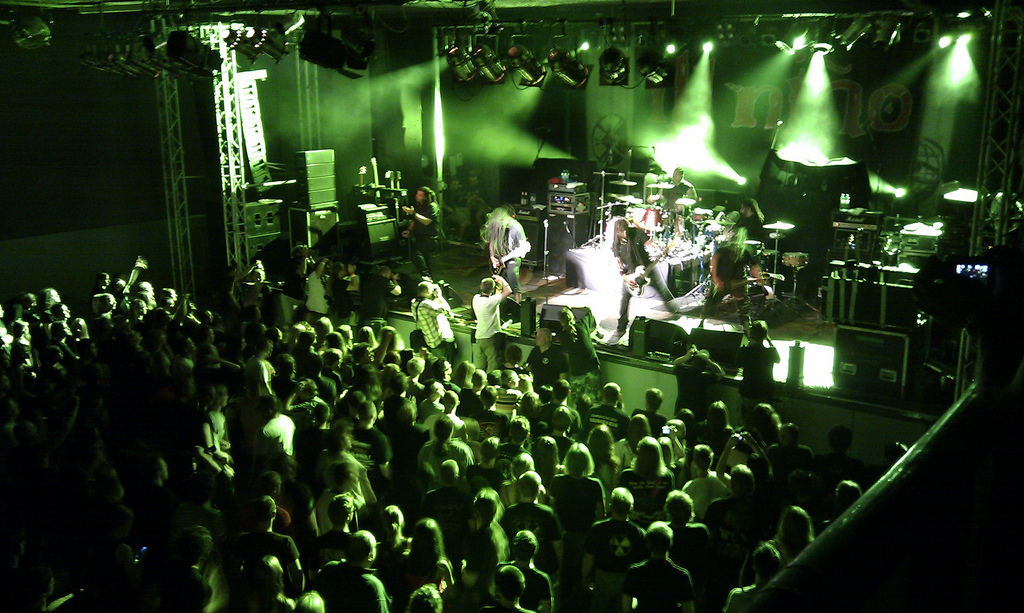
Ill Niño in concert, 2009

In March 2010, Ill Niño signed with Victory Records. Dead New World, the band's label debut, was released on October 25, 2010, and production was shared by Sahaj Ticotin and Clint Lowery of Sevendust. Epidemia, the band's sixth album, was released on October 22, 2012. This was their last release to feature long-time percussionist Daniel "Danny" Couto, who left the band in late 2013 and was replaced by Oscar Santiago. The band's seventh studio album, Till Death La Familia, was released on July 22, 2014. Afterwards, they toured in support of the new album and embarked on a worldwide "15 Years Of Revolution" tour to celebrate the 15th anniversary of Revolution Revolución in 2016 and 2017.

=== Fracture and lawsuit (2019) ===
On January 15, 2019, Dave Chavarri announced that Cristian Machado, Ahrue Luster, and Diego Verduzco had departed the band. They were replaced by Marcos Leal (Shattered Sun), Jes De Hoyos (Sons of Texas), and Salvadore Dominguez (ex-Upon a Burning Body), respectively. This occasion also saw the return of Daniel "Danny" Couto on percussion. One day later, the three former members dismissed Chavarri's public statement and assured the band's fans that they had not departed the band, vowing to continue as "Ill Niño" instead.

On March 21, 2019, MetalSucks acquired a copy of the lawsuit paperwork filed by Machado, Luster, and Verduzco accusing Chavarri of shady business deals, such as using his status as Ill Niño's manager to scam the band into taking a financial loss while repaying a personal loan, falsifying financial documents in order to keep tens of thousands of dollars for himself, pocketing show guarantees and tour advances for himself, sometimes even canceling tours and then refusing to return the promoter's advance, and refusing the band members their legally owed access to financial records, among many other accusations.

=== Settlement and continuation (2020–present) ===
In March 2020, Chavarri, Pina, Machado, Luster, and Verduzco reached a mutual agreement allowing Chavarri and Pina to continue using the Ill Niño band name. With legal issues settled, Machado, Luster, and Verduzco formed a new band, Lions at the Gate, while the reformed Ill Niño lineup began work on their eighth studio album. They released a second single, "Máscara", featuring AJ Channer from Fire from the Gods, and announced the album title as *IllMortals*.

On January 30, 2021, the band hosted a one-day virtual event titled *American Revolución*, joined by Fire From the Gods and Hyro the Hero. Notably, former Ill Niño members Marc Rizzo, Jorge Rosado, and Daniel Gomez appeared as guests—marking their first performance with the band in over 18 years.

On October 6, 2021, it was officially revealed that Marc Rizzo had rejoined Ill Niño as their permanent lead guitarist.

In an interview during the band's spring 2022 tour, Dave Chavarri announced that the new album IllMortals would be released on May 6, 2022. However, on that date, Ill Niño instead released a new single titled "This Is Over" and later announced that the album would be released on June 10, 2022. The album was once again delayed for undisclosed reasons and has not been released.

On May 13, 2023, the band re-recorded the song "Numb" from their Confession album with new arrangements and lyrics, now altered by vocalist Marcos Leal. The updated version and its video clip were posted on YouTube.

In 2024, Ill Niño embarked on a 25th anniversary tour in Europe, where former Bad Wolves singer Tommy Vext filled in for Leal. On September 24, Leal officially announced his departure from the band, and Marc Rizzo also left for the second time.

Later that year, Leal accused the rest of the band of the multiple delays regarding the planned Illmortals EPs, which were intended to feature his vocals but remain unreleased, citing the band's "incompetence" as a reason for the delays. He later engaged in a heated exchange with guitarist Jes De Hoyos on social media regarding his alleged contributions to the album.

The band began teasing a new vocalist on their social media accounts, and Tommy Roulette III (formerly of the band Jynx) was introduced as their new vocalist on July 3, 2025. The band teased a new single as well as plans to re record older material, however months would go by with no word on either. After multiple delays, the single “Born To Suffer” was released September 4, 2026 .

== Musical style and Influences ==
Ill Niño has been described as Latin metal, nu metal, alternative metal, and metalcore. Their influences include bands such as Linkin Park, Incubus, Deftones, P.O.D., Sepultura, Puya, Metallica, Bad Brains, Fear Factory, Santana, Nacao Zumbi, Sick of it All, Cro-Mags, Agnostic Front, Leeway, Misfits, Iron Maiden, Judas Priest, Black Sabbath, The Cure, Massive Attack, Sade, The Police, Queen, Ministry, Portishead, Quicksand, and Depeche Mode.

== Band members ==
Current members

- Dave Chavarri – drums (1998–present), percussion (1998–1999)
- Lazaro Pina – bass (2000–present)
- Daniel Couto – percussion (2003–2013, 2019–present, guest 2017)
- Salvadore Dominguez – rhythm guitar (2019–present)
- Jes De Hoyos – lead guitar (2019–2021, 2024–present)
- Miggy Sanchez – percussion, backing vocals (2022–present)
- Tommy Roulette III – vocals (2025–present)

Former members

- Cristian Machado – vocals (1999–2019), bass (1998–1999)
- Daniel Gomez – guitars (1998, guest 2021)
- Jorge Rosado – vocals (1998–1999, guest 2021)
- Marc Rizzo – lead guitar (1998; 1999–2003, 2021–2024, guest 2021)
- Scott Roberts – guitars (1998)
- Derek Sykes – guitars (1999)
- Jardel Martins Paisante – rhythm guitar (1999–2006)
- Roger Vasquez – percussion (1999–2003, 2025 touring)
- Omar Clavijo – turntables, samples, keyboards, percussion (2000–2006)
- Ahrue Luster – lead guitar (2003–2019)
- Diego Verduzco – rhythm guitar (2006–2019)
- Oscar Santiago – percussion (2013–2019)
- Marcos Leal – vocals (2019–2024, guest 2016)
- Xander Raymond Charles – rhythm guitar (2026)

Former touring musicians

- Tommy Vext – vocals (2024)

== Discography ==
- Revolution Revolución (2001)
- Confession (2003)
- One Nation Underground (2005)
- Enigma (2008)
- Dead New World (2010)
- Epidemia (2012)
- Till Death, La Familia (2014)
