= Cristian Machado =

American singer (born 1974)

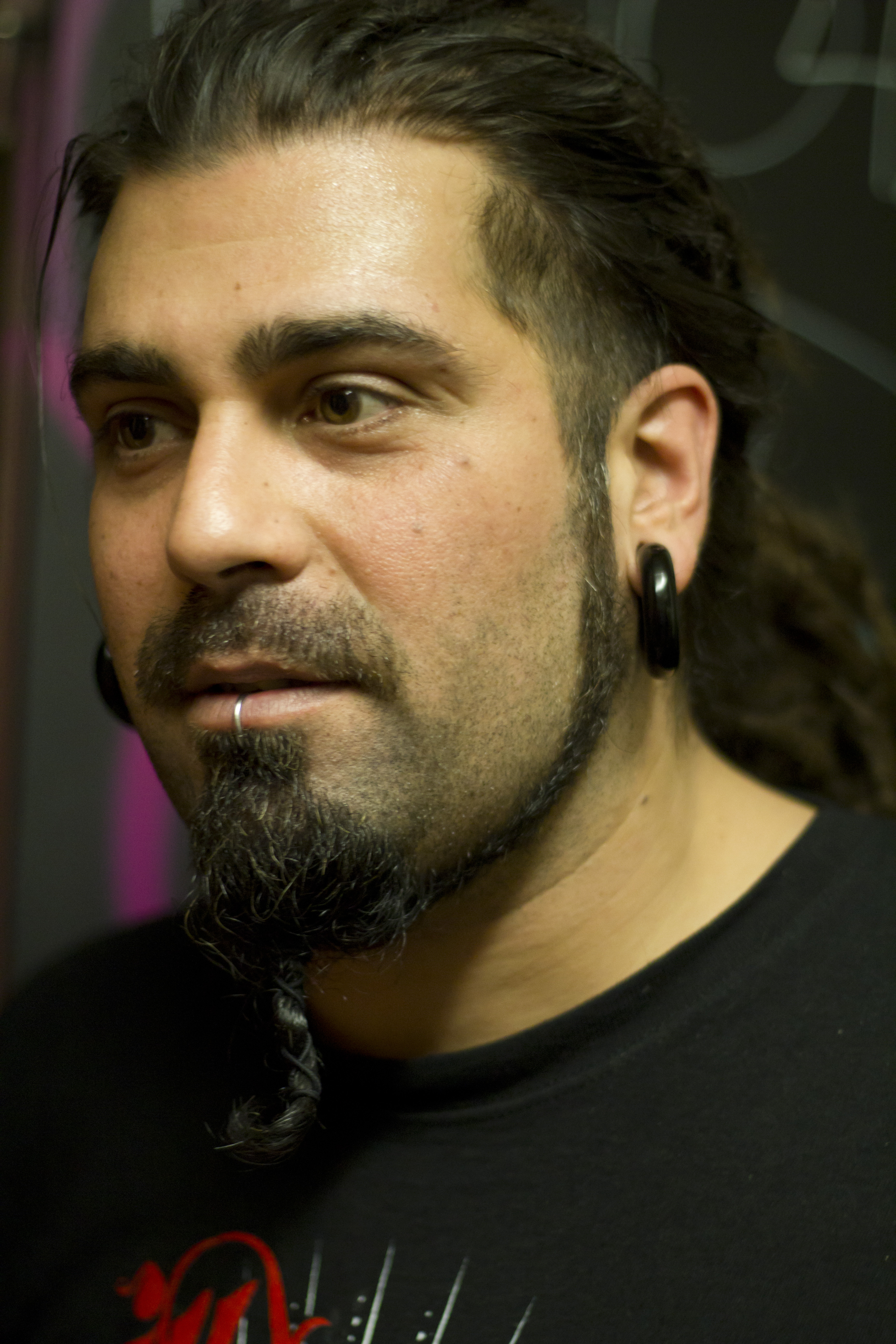
- Machado before a show in 2011

Background information
- Born: Christian Emerson Machado; July 23, 1974 (age 52); Rio de Janeiro, Brazil
- Genres: Latin metal; metalcore; nu metal; alternative metal
- Occupations: Singer; songwriter
- Years active: 1998–present
- Member of: Lions at the Gate
- Formerly of: Ill Niño; Deteriorot; Headclamp; La Familia
- Website: latgofficial.com

Cristian Machado (born July 23, 1974) is a Brazilian musician who is the vocalist of the heavy metal band Lions at the Gate. He is also the former vocalist for the nu metal band Ill Niño as well as a featured vocalist in the Roadrunner United project. Machado has also played in Headclamp and La Familia, in addition to making numerous guest appearances on albums such as Sepultura's Nation, Soulfly's 3 and 40 Below Summer's The Mourning After.

== Early life ==
Cristian Machado was born in Rio de Janeiro, the son of a musician, but soon moved to Venezuela with his mother. In 1986, they moved to New Jersey where he spent the rest of his teens. He only knew his father, Marcello Machado, halfway through his teenage years. His mother told him his stepfather was his father, and he found out only when his father called him and told him he was his real father. Machado told his father he did not want to see him. Today, however, he communicates with his father through e-mail and phone. Machado is divorced and has a daughter. The two live near his former wife in rural California.

== Career ==
Most of Cristian Machado's music influence is from his childhood without a father and growing up realizing that. Even when touring he would meet people that he felt left an impact on his life and he would show in his music how that person helped or ruined his life. The songs "Unframed" and "How Can I Live" are both about his father.

Cristian Machado used Dave Williams of Drowning Pool's microphone and stand for several years after Williams' death. They were good friends and both bands created a bond and friendship while doing the Jägermeister tour. After Williams' death during Ozzfest 2002, Drowning Pool and Dave's family gave Machado the mic and stand in respect. In a 2020 interview, Machado stated "No, I am not using Dave William's microphone stand anymore. I did use it for many years but I am now playing acoustic guitar. He was a beautiful soul and I will always honor him in my heart."

Machado left Ill Niño in 2019. On May 11, 2020, he appeared on Doc Coyle's (Bad Wolves, formerly of God Forbid) podcast, where he spoke about his new solo project which is under his name.

In May 2021, Machado made his return to a band as the vocalist of Lions at the Gate, joined on guitars by former Ill Niño bandmates Ahrue Luster and Diego Verduzco, as well as Stephen Brewer on bass and Fern Lemus on drums.

== Discography ==
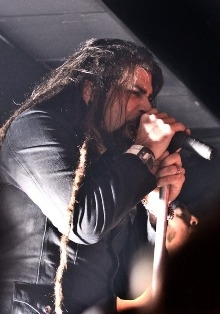
Machado performing in 2011

=== Solo ===
- Hollywood Y Sycamore (2020)

=== Lions at the Gate ===
- The Excuses We Cannot Make (2023)
