= 10 Years discography =

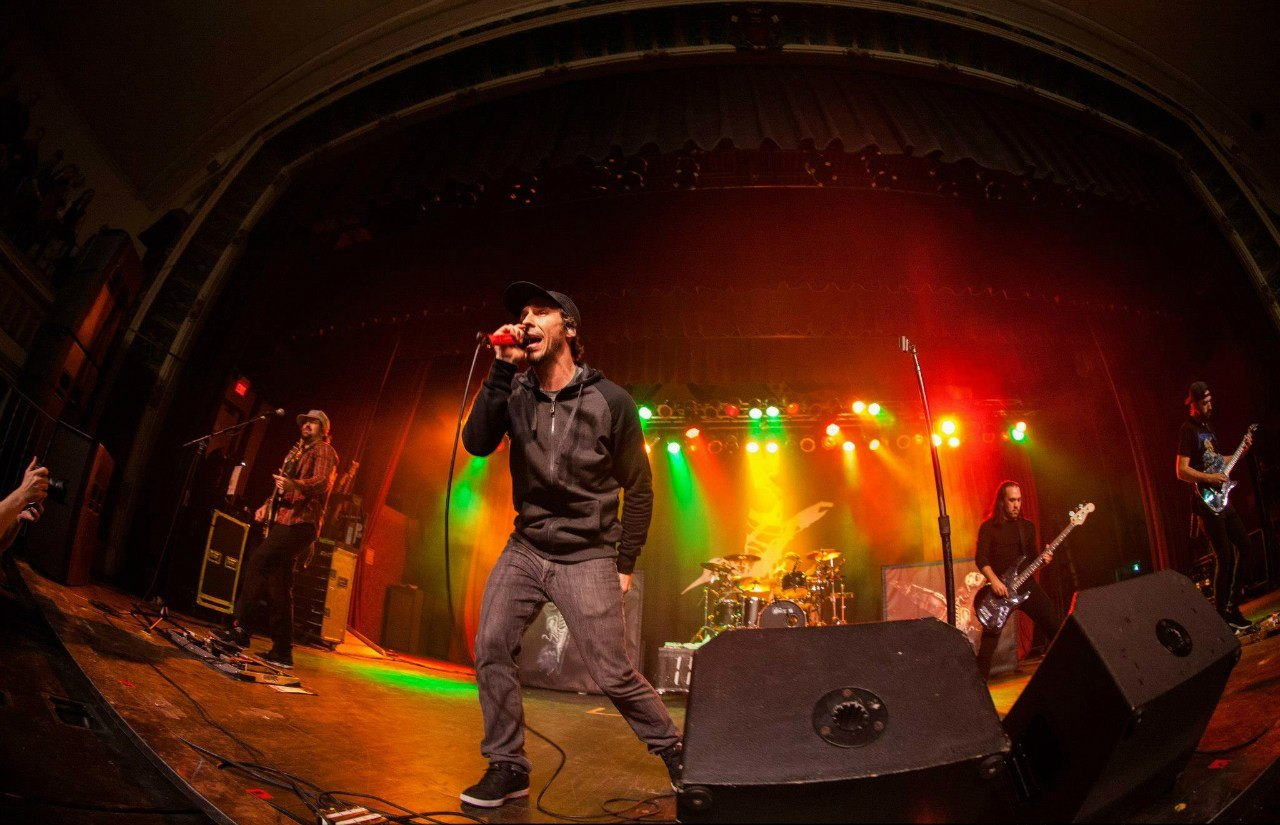
- Studio albums: 9
- EPs: 2
- Singles: 20
- Music videos: 16

This is a comprehensive discography of official recordings by 10 Years, an American alternative metal band from Knoxville, Tennessee. 10 Years has released 9 studio albums, 20 singles.

== Studio albums ==
Title	Album details	Peak chart positions			Certifications
Title	Album details	US	US Alt.	US Ind.	Certifications
Into the Half Moon	Released: August 13, 2001; Formats: CD, DI	—	—	—	
Killing All That Holds You	Released: March 22, 2004; Formats: CD, DI	—	—	—	
The Autumn Effect	Released: August 16, 2005; Label: Universal Republic; Formats: CD, DI	72	—	—	RIAA: Gold
Division	Released: May 13, 2008; Label: Universal Republic; Formats: CD, DI	12	2	—	
Feeding the Wolves	Released: August 31, 2010; Label: Universal Republic; Formats: CD, DI	17	3	—	
Minus the Machine	Released: August 7, 2012; Label: Palehorse; Formats: CD, DI	26	6	4	
From Birth to Burial	Released: April 21, 2015; Label: Palehorse; Formats: CD, DI	66	7	—	
(How to Live) As Ghosts	Released: October 27, 2017; Label: Mascot; Formats: CD, DI	92	10	8	
Violent Allies	Released: September 18, 2020; Label: Mascot; Formats: CD, DI	—	— (Note: 'Violent Allies' did not enter Billboard's Rock Albums Chart, but peaked at number 18 on the Hard Rock Albums Chart.)	—	
Deconstructed	Released: March 4, 2022; Label: Mascot; Formats: CD, DI, LP	-	-	-	
"—" denotes a release that did not chart.

== Extended plays ==
Title	EP details
Acoustic EP	Released: March 14, 2006; Label: Universal Republic; Formats: DI
Live & Unplugged at the Tennessee Theater	Released: October 29, 2013; Label: Palehorse; Formats: CD, DI
Inner Darkness	Released: October 11, 2024; Label: Mascot; Formats: CD, DI

== Singles ==
=== 2000's ===
Title	Year	Peak chart positions			Certifications	Album
Title	Year	US	US Alt.	US Main.	Certifications	Album
"Wasteland"	2005	94	1	2	RIAA: 2x Platinum	The Autumn Effect
"Through the Iris"	2006	—	35	20		The Autumn Effect
"Waking Up"	2006	—	—	32		The Autumn Effect
"Beautiful"	2008	—	14	6	RIAA: Gold	Division
"So Long, Good-bye"	2008	—	—	31		Division
"Actions & Motives"	2009	—	—	36		Division
"—" denotes a release that did not chart. "×" denotes periods where charts did not exist or were not archived.

=== 2010's ===
Title	Year	Peak chart positions			Certifications	Album
Title	Year	US Alt.	US Main.	US Rock	Certifications	Album
"Shoot It Out"	2010	21	6	11		Feeding the Wolves
"Fix Me"	2011	30	10	24	RIAA: Gold	Feeding the Wolves
"Backlash"	2012	—	18	41		Minus the Machine
"Dancing with the Dead"	2012	—	24	—		Minus the Machine
"Miscellanea"	2015	—	18	—		From Birth to Burial
"Novacaine"	2017	—	5	46		(How to Live) as Ghosts
"Burnout"	2018	—	21	—		(How to Live) as Ghosts
"—" denotes a release that did not chart. "×" denotes periods where charts did not exist or were not archived.

=== 2020's ===
Title	Year	Peak chart positions		Album
Title	Year	US Airplay	US Main.	Album
"The Shift"	2020	—	25	Violent Allies
"The Unknown"	2021	—	20	Violent Allies
"The Optimist" (original or feat. Kiarely Castillo)	2022	31	9	Inner Darkness
"No Light, No Light"	2025	—	—	Non-album single
"—" denotes a release that did not chart. "×" denotes periods where charts did not exist or were not archived.

== Promotional Singles ==
Year	Track	Album
2005	"Cast It Out"	The Autumn Effect
2005	"The Autumn Effect"	The Autumn Effect
2010	"Don't Fight It"	Feeding the Wolves
2010	"Waking Up the Ghost"	Feeding the Wolves
2010	"Fade Into (The Ocean)"	Feeding the Wolves
2011	"Now Is the Time (Ravenous)"	Feeding the Wolves
2013	"Minus the Machine"	Minus the Machine
2015	"From Birth To Burial"	From Birth to Burial
2016	"Selling Skeletons"	From Birth to Burial
2016	"Moisture Residue"	From Birth to Burial
2018	"Ghosts"	(How to Live) as Ghosts
2020	"Déjà Vu"	Violent Allies
2023	"I Remember"	Inner Darkness
2024	"Rise"	Inner Darkness

== Music videos ==
List of music videos, showing year released and director
Title	Year	Director(s)
"Wasteland"	2004	Scott Lee
"Wasteland" (Version 2)	2005	Chris Simms
"Wasteland" (Version 3)	2006	Kevin Kerslake
"Through the Iris"	2006	Chad Calek
"The Autumn Effect"	2006	Chad Calek
"Beautiful"	2008	Paul Boyd
"Shoot It Out"	2010	Israel Anthem
"Fix Me"	2011	Brad Golowin, Kevin Cross
"Backlash"	2012	Robert John Kley
"Knives"	2012	—N/a
"Dancing with the Dead"	2013	—N/a
"Miscellanea"	2015	Paul Boyd
"From Birth to Burial"	2016	Rion Sheehan
"Novacaine"	2017	—N/a
"Burnout"	2018	Robert John Kley
"The Shift"	2020	Jacob Miles
"The Optimist"	2022	—N/a
"The Optimist" (feat. Conquer Divide)	2024	Tom Flynn and Mike Watts
