= KIWR =

- Council Bluffs, Iowa; United States
- Broadcast area: Omaha Metro
- Frequency: 89.7 MHz
- Branding: 89.7 The River

Programming
- Format: Alternative
- Affiliations: Compass Media Networks

Ownership
- Owner: Iowa Western Community College; (Iowa Western Community College)

History
- First air date: November 23, 1981
- Call sign meaning: Iowa Western (Community College) Radio

Technical information
- Licensing authority: FCC
- Facility ID: 29126
- Class: C
- ERP: 100,000 watts
- HAAT: 326 meters
- Transmitter coordinates: 41°18′40″N 96°01′37″W

Links
- Public license information: Public file; LMS
- Webcast: Listen live
- Website: 897theriver.com

KIWR (89.7 FM) is a radio station broadcasting an alternative format. Based in Council Bluffs, Iowa, the station serves the Omaha Metro area. The station is licensed to Iowa Western Community College. The station has broadcast alternative rock since January 1, 1996. Prior to that, it played classical music and jazz.

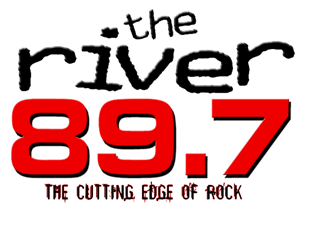
Previous logo

== The Morning Fiasco ==
Jake Ryan hosts weekday mornings from 6:00am to 10:00am with traffic, weather and general randomness. Jake has also served as the 'Voice of the Reivers' for Iowa Western's Championship winning athletic department since 2006.

== Middays ==
Tom 'Skinman' Skinner drops in after the morning show from 10:00am to 2:00pm Monday through Friday. Skinman rolls through the lunch hour with requests from noon to 1:00pm on 'The Nooner'. 'Old Skool Wednesdays' take over from noon to 2:00pm every Wednesday as Skin churns out old school alternative and rock hits. Fridays on the Nooner, it's 'Nothing but Covers' as Skinman plays covers from River artists and covers of artists played on the River from noon until 2:00pm. Skinman has been a staple in both the Omaha and Lincoln, Nebraska markets, notably working at '93 K-Rock' and '104-1 The Blaze'.

== Amplified Afternoons ==
Amplified Afternoons hits the airwaves with Corey weekday afternoons from 2:00pm to 6:00pm, which includes segments like "Wack Attack", stories about crazy fights and attacks; "the Four @ 4:00", everyday a listener gets to hear their four song choices; "Daily Flight to Florida", Bizarre news stories from Florida; "Nude Dude", stories about naked men (and sometimes women) that make the news; and Road Rage, which is all request music from 5:00pm to 6:00pm. Corey graduated the Media Studies program and worked at Journal Broadcast Group at both CD 105.9 and Channel 94.1 (formerly Channel 97.7) before returning to the airwaves of KIWR in 2012. Corey is also part of the duo VVilloughy, a Roots/Folk/Americana Music Duo (sometimes trio) with a focus on original music. VVilloughy is the Winner of Omaha Entertainment and Arts Award in Outstanding Americana/Folk for 2023 (awarded in 2024) and are also OEAA nominees in 2022, 2021, 2024, 2025.

== Weeknight and weekend programming ==
Students attending the Media Studies Program at Iowa Western Community College may be heard when standard programming played, that includes the hours of 6:00pm to midnight Monday thru Thursday, 6:00pm to 9:00pm on Fridays and all day long on Saturdays. 89.7 The River has always been a learning tool for students attending the media studies program at IWCC.

== Reiver Sports Network ==
During the fall, the sounds of the 'Reiver Sports Network' take the airwaves for Iowa Western Football. The Reivers, under head coach Scott Strohmeier, have participated in the last five NJCAA National Championship games and won the title in 2022, 2023 and 2025. Jake Ryan handles the play-by-play duties as the 'Voice of the Reivers', while fellow Reivers alum Russ Nelsen serves as his longtime color commentator. IWCC alum Josh Odson handles the statistics while Tony Boone provides additional color commentary and insight on the broadcasts.

== Specialty shows ==
KIWR hosts several specialty radio programs that are not subsets of the regular programming. This includes Pacific Street Blues which airs Sundays from 9:00am to Noon. Pacific Street Blues was awarded a 'KBA' or Keeping the Blues Alive award in 2010. PSB host, Rick Galusha, has been nominated to the Nebraska Rock n' Roll Hall of Fame. Portions of PSB have aired on several English radio stations over the years. Podcasts of the program can be heard online (https://anchor.fm/pacific-street-blues-and-americana) Other specialty and syndicated programs include Skratch N Sniff, Subterranean, and the heavy metal outlet, Sunday School, Acoustic Café, Mountain Stage(the station's only NPR program), New Day Rising, Passport Approved, and Planet O (local/regional music), the Omaha Metro's longest running program dedicated to local and regional music.

== Signal ==
KIWR's signal covers much of Southwest Iowa and the metropolitan area of both Council Bluffs, Iowa and Omaha, Nebraska. At 100,000 watts, the signal carries west of Lincoln, Nebraska, south of Nebraska City, Nebraska, as well as north just shy of Sioux City, Iowa and much of the distance between Omaha and Des Moines, Iowa. It's been said that under the right conditions, the station can be heard as far away as Burlington, Iowa.

== Festivals ==
- August 9, 2005 - River Riot: 311, Breaking Benjamin, Unwritten Law, Danko Jones, No Address, Grasshopper Takeover, Emphatic
- July 30, 2006 - River Riot: 311, Dashboard Confessional*, Yellowcard, Hawthorne Heights, Blue October, The Wailers, Matchbook Romance, Say Anything, Pepper, Swizzle Tree, Agent Sparks, Jazzwholes (Dashboard Confessional cancelled the day of the concert)
- July 21, 2007 - River Riot: Incubus, Hinder, Papa Roach, Buckcherry, Fuel, The Exies, Simon Dawes
- August 2, 2008 - River Riot: 3 Doors Down, Staind, Seether, Filter, Finger Eleven, Sick Puppies, SafetySuit
- August 14, 2009 - Rockfest: Korn, Mudvayne, Black Label Society, Static-X, Suicide Silence, Bury Your Dead, Burn Halo, After Midnight Project
- August 16, 2009 - River Riot: Blink-182, Fall Out Boy, Panic! at the Disco, Chester French, Rehab, Dirty Little Rabbits, Pomeroy
- May 14, 2010 - Rockfest: Godsmack, Rob Zombie, Alice Cooper, Hellyeah, Papa Roach, Skillet, Halestorm, Dirtfedd
- August 14, 2010 - River Riot: Stone Temple Pilots, Weezer, Blue October, Cage the Elephant, Emphatic, Flobots, Paper Tongues, Something To Burn
- May 13, 2011 - Rockfest: Stone Sour, Seether, Hollywood Undead, 10 Years, Escape the Fate, My Darkest Days, Screaming for Silence
- September 23, 2011 - River Riot: Avenged Sevenfold, Three Days Grace, Sick Puppies, Bullet for My Valentine, Escape the Fate, Sevendust, Hell Or Highwater
- May 12, 2012 - Rockfest: Incubus, Shinedown, Five Finger Death Punch, Emphatic, After the Fall
- August 17, 2012 - River Riot: Knotfest: Slipknot, Deftones, Serj Tankian, Prong, Lamb of God, Machine Head, Dethklok, The Urge, Dirtfedd
- May 11, 2013 - Rockfest: Blue October, Trapt, Taproot, Smile Empty Soul, 10 Years, Sick Puppies, Hollywood Undead, HURT, IAMDYNAMITE
- May 30, 2014 - Rockfest: Five Finger Death Punch, Black Label Society, HELLYEAH, Killswitch Engage, Sick Puppies, Escape the Fate, Emphatic, Gemini Syndrome
- May 29, 2015 - Rockfest: Papa Roach, Halestorm, The Pretty Reckless (withdrew right before performance), In This Moment, Starset, We Are Harlot, Emphatic, Arson City, Screaming for Silence
- June 2, 2015 - No Coast Fest: Cage the Elephant, Bleachers, Joywave, Icky Blossoms, Saint Motel, In The Valley Below
- May 13, 2016 - Rockfest: Rob Zombie, Lamb of God, Clutch, Atreyu, HELLYEAH, Parkway Drive, Corrosion of Conformity, Radkey, Narcotic Self, Matador
- August 19, 2016 - River Riot: Volbeat, Killswitch Engage, Sick Puppies, Hatebreed, Sevendust, Walls of Jericho, Holy White Hounds, Crobot, Westfield Massacre, Bloodcow *(Cancelled due to weather)
- May 12, 2017 - Rockfest: Soundgarden, Papa Roach, The Pretty Reckless, Pierce The Veil, Sum 41, The Dillinger Escape Plan, Biffy Clyro, Through Fire
- May 10, 2019 - River Riot: Halestorm, In This Moment, I Prevail, Sevendust, Through Fire, Palaye Royale, Beasto Blanco, The Impulsive
- October 14, 2019 - Mega Fest: Dropkick Murphy’s, Clutch, The Interrupters, Fever 333, The Urge, Hatebreed, Amigo the Devil, Killigans *(Cancelled due to weather)
- May 16, 2020 - River Riot: Hollywood Undead, Bad Wolves, From Ashes To New, Yelawolf, Royal Bliss, Venaculas, Screaming For Silence, Discrepancies, Devil in the Details *(Cancelled due to COVID-19)
- August 14, 2021 - River Riot: Halestorm, 10 Years, Through Fire, Venaculas, Royal Bliss, Saul, Screaming for Silence, Discrepancies, Devil in the Details
- August 6, 2022 - River Riot: Rob Zombie, Mudvayne, Static-X, Powerman 5000, Through Fire, The Tale Untold
- August 20, 2022 - Rockfest: Alice In Chains, Breaking Benjamin, Bush, The L.I.F.E Project, Messer, Arson City
- July 12, 2025 - The River's 30th Anniversary Show: 311, Sublime, Blue October, The Urge, Sick Puppies*, and Anchondo. *Sick Puppies cancelled the Monday before the concert due to complications with travel

== See also ==
- Campus radio
- List of college radio stations in the United States
