= Toryn Green =

American rock singer and actor (born 1975)

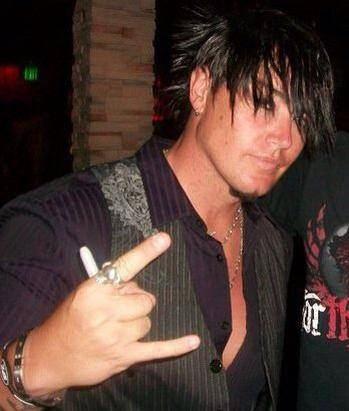
- Toryn Green

Background information
- Born: November 3, 1975 (age 50); Houston, Texas
- Origin: Los Angeles, California
- Genres: Hard rock; pop; alternative metal; country rock
- Occupations: Singer; songwriter; actor; record producer
- Instruments: Vocals; piano; drums; guitar
- Years active: 1998–present
- Website: www.toryngreen.com; www.emphaticrock.com; Toryn's Myspace

Toryn Green (born November 3, 1975) is an American rock singer. He is the former vocalist for hard rock band Fuel, as well as for Emphatic, and For the Taking. He also was the touring lead vocalist for the band Apocalyptica and performed in both of its 2008 US Worlds Collide Tours.

Green has recorded and released two full-length studio albums: Angels & Devils (Epic, 2007) with Fuel, and Another Life (Epochal Artists, 2013) with Emphatic.

In 2016, Green made his acting debut playing the villain's right-hand man Beckett in a skateboard-themed dystopian fantasy and sci-fi action film titled Skate God, written by Alexander Garcia and directed by Art Camacho. He is also co-writing a song for the film soundtrack with Brian Vodinh of 10 Years. The film was shot in Louisiana and was released in June 2017. Green has also independently released four solo singles, titled "Up to You", "Devil Standing Alone", "Lost in the Light", and "Takedown" digitally worldwide.

== Early life ==
Toryn was raised in Palmer, Alaska, where he graduated from Colony High School in 1994. Growing up Green was inspired by bands like Stone Temple Pilots, Bush, Metallica, Tool, and Fuel. His father was very musical and he says he gained a lot of inspiration through him. He used to sing with his father since he was a small boy, but his first public solo performance was at Alaska State Fair. He moved to California in October 1998 to pursue a career in music.

== Career ==
Green took his songwriting to the stage in his first band "Patience Worth", with band members Orion Rainz, Ryan Giles, and Cesar Guevarra. They recorded a few songs together, but eventually the band was moving in different creative directions. With his next band, Southern California rock band Something To Burn, Green won a Rock Beijing Global competition and was invited to play to a crowd of approximately 30,000 fans at the Midi festival in Beijing in October 2005. Two months later they represented America in the Worldwide Battle of the Bands held in Hong Kong. With STB Green recorded an EP entitled The Incinerator, which was released in April 2006.

=== With Fuel and Apocalyptica ===
Green was chosen the lead vocalist of hard rock band Fuel from over 1000 submissions on worldwide website auditions held in early 2006 to replace Brett Scallions. He recorded and submitted his version of the song "Hemorrhage (In My Hands)" two hours after hearing about the open website audition from a friend. Thinking that wasn't enough to stand out, he went on to buy instrumental versions of "Bad Day" and "Innocent", made a medley out of those songs with "Hemorrhage", and submitted it under different name. In the end, both his entries were listed among twelve finalists.

While auditioning for Fuel, Green met Scott Weiland (Velvet Revolver, Stone Temple Pilots) who got excited over the recording he had recently done with Something To Burn and offered them a deal through his label, Softdrive Records. However, around the same time Fuel made their offer, and Green had to decide between two contracts.

Green signed with Fuel in July 2006, before entering the studio to record the band's next album for Epic Records from August to November 2006. The official announcement of Green being the next frontman for Fuel wasn't made until April 19, 2007, on Extra TV show, exactly a year after the live auditions in Los Angeles. He co-wrote "Halos of the Son" with Jeff Abercrombie and former "Patience Worth" bandmate, Ryan Giles, and released it on their album Angels & Devils on August 7, 2007. The band toured in support of the album through early 2008 and appeared live on The Tonight Show with Jay Leno and TLC’s season finale of LA Ink, where Green was featured getting ambigram tattoo on his forearm.

When Fuel went into hiatus in 2008, Green joined Finnish cello rock band Apocalyptica as their touring lead vocalist on both US legs of Worlds Collide tour, and again at Apocalyptica's US television debut on NBC's Last Call with Carson Daly.

=== For The Taking ===
After Fuel and Apocalyptica, Green began collaborations with different co-writers around the country, including Brian Vodinh of 10 Years. Wanting to have a band behind him on some of the songs that he was writing, Green teamed up with the remnants of Long Island hard rockers A Farewell Fire (Eddie Raccioppi, Mike Zagel, & Ray Rossler) who had recently split with their singer. The new band For The Taking played their debut gig at The Music Mill in Indianapolis October 12, 2009. The band continued writing and collaborating with a number of co-writers, including Corey Lowery of Eye Empire, Tommy Henriksen, and Skidd Mills. A couple of lineup changes later the band was composed of Green (lead vocals), Raccioppi (guitar, backing vocals), Joe Meyer (ex-Blameshift, bass), and James Miller (ex-Blameshift, drums).

For The Taking self-released Blackout EP on Amazon and iTunes on September 17, 2011, along with music video for the single "Lie To Me", directed by Brett Bortle. "Lie To Me" is a co-write with Corey Lowery.

Two songs from the 4-song demo that Green wrote with Brian Vodinh before forming the band, "Time is Running Out" and "Takedown", are featured on the MMA fighting movie Never Back Down 2: The Beatdown soundtrack. Due to the popularity of NBD2, For The Taking released "Time is Running Out" as a single on iTunes on December 8, 2011.

On January 27, 2012, before the show at Sky Bar Lounge in Indianapolis, For The Taking's trailer was broken into and $5000 worth of band equipment, including all guitars and merchandise were stolen. The band had to perform that night with rented gear. A week later, after anonymous tip informing of photos from the stolen property displayed at a Facebook page of a pawn shop, a local man was arrested in connection to the band theft and receiving stolen property. Only two of the missing guitars and some other equipment were discovered from his home.

On November 19, 2012, Green announced on the band's Facebook page that For The Taking is placed "into an indefinite hiatus". The band played their last shows in New York end of June 2012. Green joined Emphatic, and Eddie Raccioppi and Joe Meyer continued with Eddie's brainchild, a Long Island alternative rock band I Ignite.

=== Emphatic ===
Green was the new lead vocalist for the Omaha-based hard-rock band Emphatic, replacing the former singer Patrick Wilson, as announced on Green's Twitter and the band's Facebook on October 25, 2012. The band released a record titled Another Life on October 22, 2013. The single "Remember Me", written by Justin McCain, Toryn Green, and Sahaj, impacted radio on July 30, 2013, and was released on iTunes August 20, 2013. Both the album and the single charted in the Top 30 on Billboard and Mediabase rock charts, and the band had plans of touring in support of the album in 2014. However, Green didn't join Emphatic on tour with RED in February, but announced his departure from the band instead, stating creative differences with founder Justin McCain.

=== Out West ===
In 2015, Green reunited with his former bandmates from Something To Burn for a country music project titled OUT WEST.[27][28]

=== The Journey To Medicine ===
In 2012, Green decided to step away from touring and started his path towards becoming a doctor. He graduated from the University of California Davis with a Bachelor of Science degree in Neurobiology, Physiology and Behavior in 2017. He graduated from AUC School of Medicine in 2023 and is currently an Emergency Medicine Resident Physician at Henry Ford Health in Jackson, Michigan.

== Appearances ==
On the October 30, 2007, episode of LA Ink, Green received an ambigram tattoo from Kim Saigh on his left forearm. Both of Toryn's Ambigram tattoos (Angel/Devil and Sinner/Saint) were designed by Ambigram Artist Mark Palmer of WowTattoos.

Toryn performed the national anthem for the NASCAR Championship race in Homestead, Florida, in the fall of 2007.

Toryn Green was touring lead vocalist for Apocalyptica, performing their number 1 hit, "I Don't Care" on NBC's Last Call with Carson Daly. It was the band's US television debut which aired on October 31, 2008.

In 2008, Green appeared in "Distracted Driving", an educational video for the State of Illinois, to promote distracted driving awareness to teenagers.

Between tours, Toryn performed acoustic cover sets with Ronny Paige (touring bassist for Fuel and lead guitarist of Forever Oeuvre) and Chad Szeliga (drummer of Breaking Benjamin and Forever Oeuvre).

On October 12, 2009, Toryn made the debut live performance of his new band "For The Taking" during a private gala celebrating the grand reopening of The Music Mill in Indianapolis, Indiana, with local band New Addiction. "Hemorrhage" was the only Fuel song played during this show.

== Discography ==
Something To Burn

- The Incinerator EP (2006)

Fuel

- Angels & Devils (Album) (2007)
- Playlist: The Very Best of Fuel (Compilation) (2008)

For The Taking

- 4 Song EP (2009)
- Time Is Running Out (Single) (2011)
- Blackout EP (2011/2026)

Emphatic

- Another Life (2013)

Toryn Green

- Where Do We Go From Here (Single) (2025)

Patience Worth

- My World (Single) (2026)
