= Bill Hudson (guitarist) =

Brazilian-American heavy metal guitarist (born 1983)

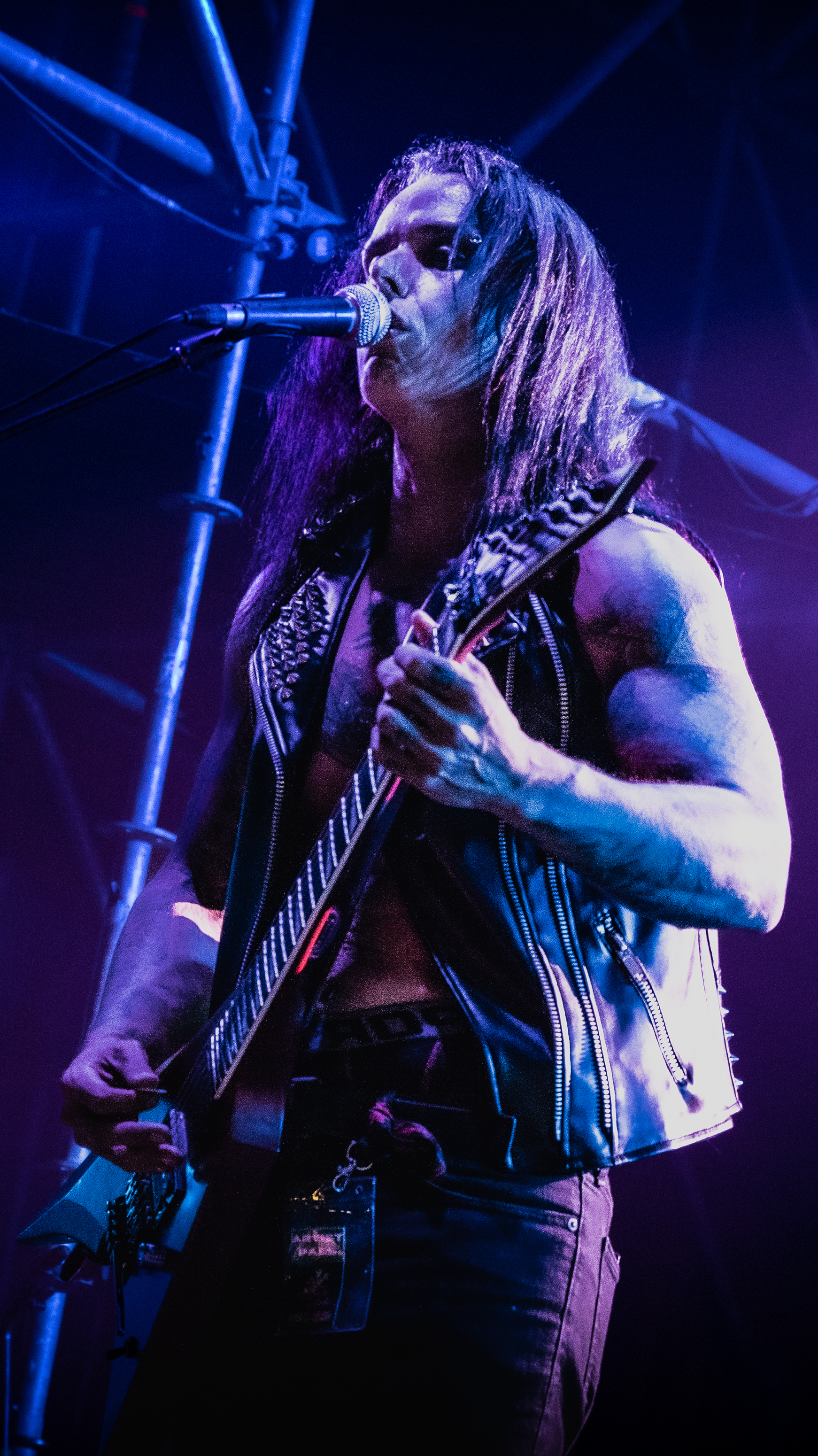
- Hudson performing with Doro in 2023

Background information
- Born: Niuton Rodrigues Filho; January 13, 1983 (age 43); São Paulo, Brazil
- Genres: Heavy metal; hard rock; power metal; progressive metal; death metal; metalcore
- Occupation: Musician
- Instrument: Guitar
- Years active: 2005–present
- Member of: NorthTale; Trans-Siberian Orchestra; Doro; I Am Morbid; Westfield Massacre; Circle II Circle; As I Lay Dying
- Formerly of: U.D.O.; Dirkschneider; Savatage; Jon Oliva's Pain; Nightrage; Cellador; Power Quest
- Spouse: Adriana Hette (m. 2024)

Bill Hudson (born Niuton Rodrigues Filho; January 13, 1983), is a Brazilian-American heavy metal guitarist, currently serving as the main composer, lead guitarist and founder for power metal supergroup NorthTale. He worked with the Trans-Siberian Orchestra as well German heavy metal bands U.D.O. and Dirkschneider, both fronted by former Accept vocalist Udo Dirkschneider and American death metal band I Am Morbid, featuring former Morbid Angel frontman David Vincent and drummer Pete Sandoval. As of 2021, he is the guitarist for German heavy metal legend Doro Pesch, after acting as a fill in guitarist since 2017.

He has since gone on to perform and record with several artists, including the Trans-Siberian Orchestra, Savatage, U.D.O, Doro, Jon Oliva's Pain, Circle II Circle, Vital Remains, Nightrage and Power Quest. Currently, he is co-lead guitarist in I Am Morbid, the new band of former Morbid Angel members David Vincent and Tim Yeung.

== Early life and education ==
Born and raised in São Paulo, Brazil, he moved to the United States in 2005 in order to join the power metal band Cellador, playing on their debut album Enter Deception and remaining in their line-up until early 2008.

Hudson started playing guitar at the age of twelve. He was mainly influenced by Slash. His first teacher was Kiko Loureiro who used to play in Angra and Megadeth.

After finishing high school, he attended the FAAM music college in his native Brazil, in pursuit of a classical composition degree.

A few years later, he attended the Musicians Institute in Hollywood, CA and has been mentioned among the success stories on their website several times.

== Career ==
His first work of note was for a studio project called The Supremacy. The project featured well-known European musicians, such as drummer Mark Cross (ex-Firewind and ex-Helloween), as well as keyboard player Joost Van den Broek, of After Forever, Ayreon, Star One, among others. This project has not done much other than the recording of two songs in 2004.

In 2005, Hudson auditioned for German power metal band Freedom Call, after being referred by longtime friend Cede Dupont, who had just quit said band. However, his "big" break did not come until later that year, when he auditioned for and joined the American power metal band Cellador, on Metal Blade Records.

Between 2006 and 2008 he remained in Cellador's lineup as a lead guitarist, traveling through all of the US and Canada both headlining and supporting acts such as Bullet For My Valentine, All That Remains and Trivium. Hudson was featured at the July 2007 issue of Guitar World magazine and in the Betcha Can't Play This series. His last show with the band was in Japan, at the Loud Park Festival, sharing the stage with such acts as Heaven And Hell, Marilyn Manson, Blind Guardian and Arch Enemy. He announced his departure from the group in January 2008.

In June, 2008 in a press release from UK based melodic power metal band Power Quest announced that Bill Hudson had joined as co-lead guitarist alongside Andrea Martongelli. Bill had to leave the band ten months later, with band member Steve Williams citing Bill's current location and costs as practical problems for the band.

Hudson was then contacted by Savatage vocalist Zak Stevens about joining his band Circle II Circle for a US tour alongside Jon Oliva's Pain. He remains in the band's lineup to date, having toured with them through throughout the US, Europe and Dubai including the world's biggest heavy metal festivals and several headline dates. A 2012 appearance at the Wacken Open Air festival in Germany, resulted in the live album "Live At Wacken", out via earMUSIC. Hudson's contributions in the studio can be heard in the albums "Seasons Will Fall" (2012) and "Reigh of Darkness" (2015).

In 2012, while in Dubai with CIIC, he was contacted by longtime friend and Vital Remains vocalist Brian Werner about joining the band for a few shows. This resulted in Hudson joining the band as lead guitarist for an appearance at the 2012 Metal Cruise through the Bahamas Barge To Hell, as well as a tour of 6 shows in his home country, Brazil. It would be the first time he performed there as a professional musician.

He was soon after contacted by producer Logan Mader about recording guitars for the soundtrack of the Metal Gear Rising: Revengeance video game. Hudson's guitar can be heard on the tracks "The Only Thing I Know For Real" and "Red Sun". An ongoing relationship with Mader has also led Hudson to record lead guitars on the producer's own band Once Human's, debut album "The Life I Remember", out on earMUSIC.

In 2014, he becomes Jon Oliva's Pain new lead guitarist. The group headlines the 2014 edition of the ProgPower USA festival, playing the Savatage album, "Streets" in its entirety.

That same year he begins working with former SNOT and Divine Heresy vocalist Tommy Vext in what would become the band Westfield Massacre. Hudson and Vext wrote six songs in partnership, all of which are included in the band's debut album, out via Urban Yeti in 2015. Hudson appears in the music video for his composition Darkness Divides as the band's lead guitarist. The video also features former Morbid Angel and Divine Heresy drummer, Tim Yeung.

In 2015 he performs at the once again at the Wacken Open Air festival in Germany, this time as a member of Savatage, as headliners. Soon after he announces his recruitment into the Trans-Siberian Orchestra for their 2015 Winter Tour, replacing Joel Hoekstra, who was simultaneously touring with Whitesnake.

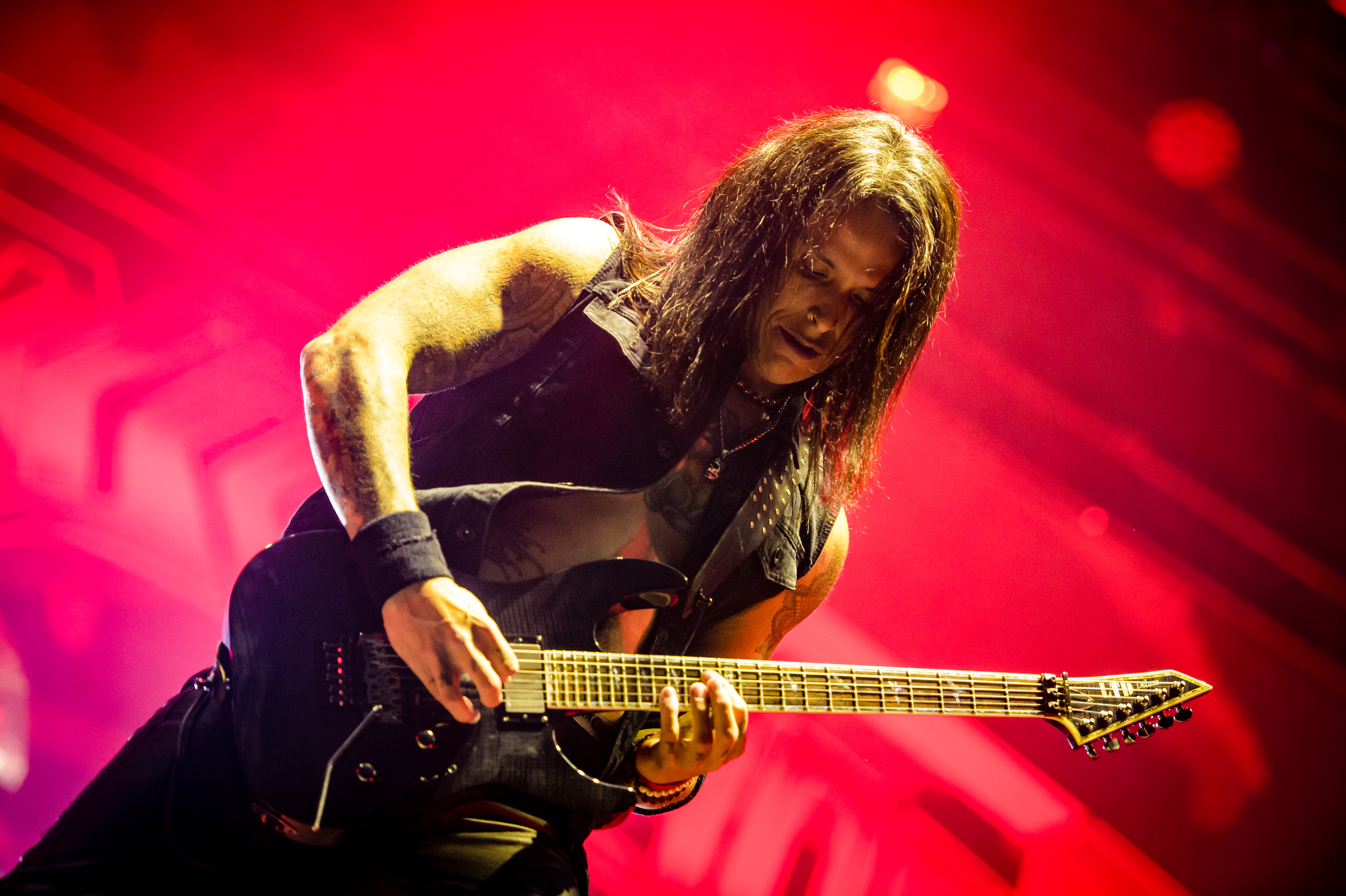
Hudson performing with Dirkschneider in 2017

In 2017, Hudson was announced as the new guitarist for U.D.O. and Dirkschneider, the German bands led by former Accept frontman, Udo Dirkschneider. Around the same time, former Morbid Angel frontman has announced that he would be starting a new band with the band's former drummer Tim Yeung and would be taking Hudson as co-guitarist alongside Ira Black. On April 24, 2018, it was announced that Hudson left U.D.O and Dirkschneider after only a year due to individual differences with no hard feelings on both sides.

In late 2017, he founded NorthTale alongside ex-Twilight Force singer Christian Eriksson and former Yngwie Malmsteen drummer Patrick Johansson. Still in 2021, NorthTale released their second album, “Eternal Flame”, which featured a guest appearance by Kai Hansen and was released by Nuclear Blast Records.

In 2021 he became the full time guitarist for Doro, replacing Luca Princiotta. In October 2025 he joined As I Lay Dying.

== Discography ==
- Cellador - Enter Deception (Metal Blade Records, 2006)
- Avian - Ashes And Madness (Nightmare Records, 2007)
- Vernon Neilly & Friends - A Tribute To Stevie Wonder (Boosweet Records, 2007)
- Power Quest - Master Of Illusion (Napalm Records, 2008)
- Echoterra - The Law of One (2008)
- Infernaeon - From Genesis To Nemesis (Prosthetic Records, 2010)
- Circle II Circle - Seasons Will Fall (earMUSIC, 2012)
- Metal Gear Rising: Revengeance Soundtrack (2012)
- Emphatic - Another Life (Epochal Artists, 2013)
- Stardust Reverie Project - Ancient Rites of the Moon (Avispa, 2014)
- Once Human - "The Life I Remember" (earMUSIC, 2014)
- Circle II Circle - Live At Wacken (earMUSIC, 2014)
- Westfield Massacre - "Westfield Massacre" (Urban Yeti Records, 2015)
- Circle II Circle - Reign of Darkness (earMUSIC, 2015)
- Stardust Reverie Project - Proclamation of Shadows (Kuiama Records, 2015)
- NorthTale - Welcome to Paradise - (Nuclear Blast, 2019)
- NorthTale - Eternal Flame - (Nuclear Blast, 2021)

== Instruments ==
Bill Hudson uses and endorses ESP Guitars, Kemper amps, Seymour Duncan Pickups, Cleartone strings, Traveler Guitar and Jim Dunlop.
