= The Shift (song) =

Single by 10 Years

from the album Violent Allies
- Released: May 15, 2020
- Recorded: 2019
- Genre: Hard rock
- Songwriters: Jesse Hasek: Brian Vodinh; Matt Wantland
- Producer: Howard Benson

10 Years singles chronology
"Burnout" (2017)	"The Shift" (2020)	"The Unknown" (2021)

"The Shift" is a song by American alternative metal band 10 Years. It was their first single off of their ninth studio album, Violent Allies. It peaked on the Billboard Mainstream Rock Songs chart at 25 in 2020.

== Background and recording ==
The song was recorded in late 2019 for the band's upcoming untitled ninth studio album due out in 2020. The song was recorded with music producer Howard Benson, who the band previously worked with on their album Feeding the Wolves. The song was the product of very challenging recording sessions with Benson, who rejected 75% of the material previously written prior to entering the studio, leaving the band to write and record new material in the studio on the spot with Benson. A lyric video was released at the same time as the single's May 15, 2020 release. As of October 2020, the single had peaked at number 25 on the Billboard Mainstream Rock.

== Themes and composition ==
Lyrically, guitarist Brian Vodinh described the song as being about "the polarization of society and human impact on the earth itself". Additionally, the line "from silence to sirens" was commentary on how quickly things become issues in "social media culture". The song makes multiple allusions to humanity being like a virus; the song was written in mid-2019, well before the COVID-19 pandemic, so it was not written specifically about it, though it was released as a single due to its newfound relevance.

The song was written and recorded on a baritone guitar tuned to B tuning, a different set up for the band. Vodinh stated he felt that it gave the song a thicker and heavier guitar sound. Loudwire described it as a "mid-tempo melodic track" with gradual increases in tempo and guitar aggressiveness and grittiness.

== Reception ==
Loudwire names it one of the best rock songs of 2020.

== Personnel ==
10 Years

- Jesse Hasek – vocals
- Brian Vodinh – guitar, drums
- Matt Wantland - guitar

Production

- Howard Benson - production

== Charts ==
Chart (2020)	Peak position
US Mainstream Rock (Billboard)	25
