= Novacaine (song) =

2017 single by 10 Years

Single by 10 Years

from the album (How to Live) As Ghosts
- Released: August 16, 2017
- Recorded: 2016–2017
- Genre: Rock; alternative rock
- Length: 2:50
- Label: Mascot
- Songwriters: Jesse Hasek; Chad Huff; Brian Vodinh; Matt Wantland

10 Years singles chronology
"Moisture Residue" (2016)	"Novacaine" (2017)	"Burnout" (2018)

"Novacaine" is a song by American alternative metal band 10 Years. It was the first single from their eighth studio album (How to Live) As Ghosts. It peaked at number 5 on the Billboard US Mainstream Rock Songs chart.

== Background ==
The song was first released on August 16, 2017, as the first single from the band's eighth studio album, (How to Live) As Ghosts. A music video was released on September 26, 2017.

== Themes and composition ==
Lyrically, Hasek explained that the song is about the loss of enthusiasm people go through as they transition from youth to adulthood. He described:

At some point, you start to get real adult problems. Life has such a numbing to it. You see people go from such optimism in their 20s to having life just beat them down later. I think we all kind of get desensitized and numb to life on some level."

The track was described as one of three key tracks from the album that deal with issues of mortality and mankind.

Journalists noted that the song still generally sounded like 10 Year's alternative metal sound, but with more of an alternative rock edge to it. The song was noted as being less aggressive than the songs of their prior album, From Birth to Burial, and not as epic as their biggest single, "Wasteland", but that it still contained Hasek's soaring vocals over a big guitar sound. Loudwire described the song as a "driving rocker with...guitar pulsing through the track... Jesse Hasek's voice...powering the song with a rather atmospheric and triumphant feel in the chorus as he really opens it up."

== Music video ==
The song's music video reflects the song's lyrical content of being stuck in life through a scenario similar to the film Groundhog Day. In the video, the main character, a business man, appears to have his life together, with a nice job, living place, and car, but feels like he's in a slump living the same boring day over and over again. Additionally, he continues to encounter random strangers that keep saying "dead as dead can be" to him.

== Personnel ==
10 Years

- Jesse Hasek – vocals
- Brian Vodinh – guitar, drums
- Matt Wantland - guitar

Production

- Nick Raskulinecz - production

== Charts ==
Chart (2018)	Peak position
Canada Rock (Billboard)	37
US Hot Rock & Alternative Songs (Billboard)	46
US Rock & Alternative Airplay (Billboard)	22
