= Emphatic (band) =

American hard rock band

- Origin: Omaha, Nebraska, United States
- Genres: Hard rock
- Years active: 2004–2015
- Labels: Pavement Entertainment (2014–2015); Epochal Artist; Capitol (2012–2014); Atlantic (2009–2012); Independent (2004–2010)
- Past members: Justin McCain; Grant Joshua Kendrick; Jesse "Saint" Nunn; Patrick Mussack; Lance Dowdle; Toryn Green; Bill Hudson; Patrick Michael Wilson; Alan Larson; Jeff Fenn; Tom Lynch; Dylan Wood
- Website: emphaticrock.com

Emphatic was an American hard rock band from Omaha, Nebraska, founded by guitarist-songwriter Justin McCain in 2004. Their major label debut album Damage for Atlantic reached No. 9 on Billboard Top Heatseekers chart in 2011. The band's second album Another Life climbed to No. 8 on Top Heatseekers chart in 2013. Justin McCain announced changing the band's name and continuing as Through Fire in December 2015.

== History ==
=== Early years and Damage (2004–2012) ===
Emphatic was founded in 2004 by songwriter and lead guitarist Justin McCain. Emphatic released their debut self-titled EP in 2004. In 2005 Emphatic released a self-titled full length album with the four track from the debut EP plus four new songs. In 2005 Emphatic signed to Universal but never released anything with the label. In 2008, their EP Goodbye Girl spent 17 weeks on the Billboard's North West Central Top Heatseekers Chart. After Justin met A&R exec, Jeff Blue, on a phone consultation, the two met in Nebraska to write their first song "Put Down the Drink". The band signed to Jeff Blue's Rock Shop Music Group in early 2009, and Jeff and Justin immediately started working on new material. Blue brought the demo to several labels and Emphatic signed with Atlantic in December 2009 and signed a management deal with In De Goot Entertainment as well.

Emphatic consisted of only three members at that point, songwriter and guitarist Justin McCain, vocalist Patrick Michael Wilson, and bassist Alan Larson. Justin and Patrick went into the studio soon after to record their major label debut with multiplatinum producer Howard Benson. Josh Freese played drums on the record and Paul Bushnell played bass. After the record was finished Emphatic brought in Lance Dowdle on guitar and Dylan Wood on drums. The major label debut Damage was released on July 12, 2011.

Emphatic was offered an opening slot on The Carnival of Madness Tour in conjunction with the release of their first single "Bounce" which climbed to No. 19 on the charts. Patrick Wilson suffered a vocal injury (fractured larynx) before the tour which almost put the brakes on the project. Guitarist Justin McCain was developing an Omaha-based rock band at the time called The Wreckage, so he pulled vocalist Grant Joshua Kendrick out of the project to hit the road filling in for Patrick Wilson. The tour gained Emphatic thousands of new fans and helped launch the second single "Get Paid" which landed at No. 30 on the charts. After The Carnival of Madness tour the band went out on the road with Art of Dying, Adelitas Way, and New Medicine with yet another singer, Bryan Scott from Dev Electric.

Emphatic took a break to wait for Patrick to return and in the meantime was featured on CBS hit TV show Criminal Minds with their song "Do I", and on the WWE with their version of The Corre's theme song "End of Days." After 10 months vocalist Patrick Wilson finally reunited with the band along with new drummer Patrick Mussack and hit the road to tour as support for Halestorm and New Medicine. Octane started playing the third single "Put Down The Drink" which quickly landed on the BIG UNS countdown and spent 4 weeks at No. 1. However, halfway through the Halestorm tour McCain found out the label wasn’t going to pick up their next option on the contract.

After the tour Patrick Wilson left the band because his son was born. Lance Dowdle and Alan Larson left the band shortly after as well.

=== Another Life (2012–2014) ===
Justin McCain wanted to rebuild the band and brought in Toryn Green on vocals, former frontman of platinum selling artist Fuel and Apocalyptica. Actor/musician Jesse Saint (Scum of the Earth/The Autumn Offering) joined the band as the new bass player and Bill Hudson of Cellador joined as co-lead guitar player. McCain was able to land the band another record deal with Epochal Artist Records/Capitol, and they started working on new material, set to record in early 2013.

McCain and Green joined forces creatively in making of the record, both bringing in songs from their own arsenal, and working together on writing new ones. The record includes collaborations with "Sahaj" Ticotin of alternative metal band Ra, Tommy Henriksen, Brian Vodinh of 10 Years, Bobby Huff, Tobin Esperance (bassist of Papa Roach), and Johnny Andrews.

The new album Another Life, produced by Justin McCain and co-produced by Ryan Greene, was released through Epochal Artists Records on October 22, 2013. The single "Remember Me", written by Justin McCain, Toryn Green and Sahaj, impacted radio on July 30, 2013, and was released on iTunes August 20, 2013. It reached Top 40 on U.S active rock and mainstream rock charts.

In support of the album, Emphatic toured with Red and Gemini Syndrome in February 2014. The band performed without lead singer Toryn Green and co-lead guitarist Bill Hudson who were replaced by Grant Kendrick and Lance Dowdle, as announced on the band's website February 2, 2014. Toryn Green announced his departure from the band on February 9, 2014, stating creative differences with McCain.

After the tour, Justin McCain announced signing to Pavement Entertainment, and a new album being in the works, due late 2014. "With some welcomed changes that have occurred with Emphatic, we felt it necessary to get back into the studio and make an album that reflects the current vision of the band" stated McCain in the press release. McCain also welcomed long-time touring vocalist Grant Kendrick "full time" to the band on the band's Facebook page. He also revealed that the new album will be featuring guest singers, such as Sahaj from Ra and Phil Anson from Venaculas, and a collaboration with Jonny Hetherington of Art of Dying.

=== New album and name change (2014–2015) ===
After a headlining tour in late 2014 to partially promote their upcoming album, Emphatic waited to announce the single and release date. In June 2015, after months of waiting, Emphatic released 7 songs to preview for only a few hours. Among the previewed tracks were redone cuts of "Damage," the unreleased title track from the 2011 album, and "Stronger," originally a demo before the band signed to Atlantic Records. After this, nothing more was heard about the new album until August 9, 2015, when it was announced that the band had split from Pavement Entertainment, calling it a necessary move for the best of the band, and wished Pavement well in their upcoming endeavors.

In December 2015 the band announced changing their name to Through Fire and that the new album will be released as a new band in 2016.

== Discography ==
=== Studio albums ===
Year	Album details	Peak chart positions		
Year	Album details	US Heat.	US Hard	US Ind.
2005	Emphatic: Label: Independent	—	—	—
2011	Damage: Released: July 12, 2011; Label: Atlantic	9	23	—
2013	Another Life: Released: October 22, 2013; Label: Epochal, Capitol	8	22	40

=== Extended plays ===
Year	Album details	Peak chart positions		
Year	Album details	US Heat.	US Hard	US Ind.
2008	Goodbye Girl (EP): Label: Independent	—	—	—
2010	Riot 10 (Limited edition EP): Label: Independent	—	—	—

=== Singles ===
Year	Song	Peak chart positions	Album
Year	Song	US Main.	Album
2011	"Bounce"	23	Damage
2011	"Get Paid"	30	Damage
2012	"Put Down the Drink"	—	Damage
2013	"Remember Me"	30	Another Life

== Band members ==
Final lineup

- Justin McCain – lead guitar (2004–2015)
- Grant Joshua Kendrick – vocals (2011, 2014–2015)
- Patrick Mussack – drums (2012–2015)
- Jesse Saint – bass (2012–2015)

Other members

- Patrick Michael Wilson – vocals (2004–2011, 2012)
- Tom Lynch – co-lead electric guitar (2004–2010)
- Mike Schmit – bass
- Jason Blayney – drums
- Alan Larson – bass
- Matt Denker – drums
- Cameron Waters – drums
- Lance Dowdle – lead and rhythm guitar (2010–2012, 2014–2015)
- Dylan Wood – drums (2010–2012)
- Jeff Fenn – keys/samples, programming
- Bryan Scott – vocals (2011)
- Toryn Green – vocals (2012–2014)
- Bill Hudson – co-lead electric guitar (2012–2014)
