= Fix Me =

Fix Me may refer to:

- Fix Me (album), an album by Marianas Trench, or the title song
- Fix Me (song), a 2010 song by 10 Years
- Fix Me, a song by Black Flag, from the EP Nervous Breakdown
- Fix Me, a 2007 song by Velvet
- Fix Me, a 2011 song by Nicola Roberts, from the Lucky Day single
- FIXME in computer programming
