= Shoot It Out =

Single by 10 Years

from the album Feeding the Wolves
- Released: June 12, 2010
- Recorded: 2010
- Length: 3:20
- Label: Universal
- Songwriters: Jesse Hasek, Brian Vodinh, Ryan E. Johnson, Lewis Cosby
- Producer: Howard Benson

10 Years singles chronology
"Actions & Motives" (2009)	"Shoot It Out" (2010)	"Fix Me" (2011)

Music video
- "Shoot It Out" on YouTube

"Shoot It Out" is a song written and recorded by the American alternative metal band 10 Years for their fifth studio album, Feeding the Wolves, which is their third major release under Universal Records. It was released as the album's first single.

On June 12, 2010, "Shoot It Out" was played on Sirius/XM Radio. The track was released to radio in late June, and was made available to download on iTunes July 6.

== Background ==
The song is one of the heaviest of the record and it is also one of the heaviest songs 10 Years did so far, as they mentioned that Feeding the Wolves would be their heaviest material to date. The song's screamed vocals harken back to the band's first album which featured original singer Mike Underdown on vocals.

The title of the record is taken from a line in the song.

== Composition ==
Singer Jesse Hasek says that the song "Shoot It Out" is about the pressures the band has faced in the music business. "It's a very aggressive song and it's a little bit of angst towards just how they don't leave you alone to be the musicians you are," he tells The Pulse of Radio. "You hear it with a lot of bands, the whole 'jaded' scenario, but it's true, because we're a bunch of musicians that were writing music all on our own with no outside sources affecting us. And then you get, it turns into a profession and you get pulled in all sorts of directions. And we just said, 'Enough's enough, we're just gonna do what we want.'".

== Music video ==
The music video for the song, directed by Israel Anthem, was released on August 31, 2010. It features the band playing in the dark and there are parts where everyone in the band is faceless and shots of them being covered in chocolate and maple syrup . This is related to the lyrics of the song.

== Chart performance ==
"Shoot It Out" peaked on Billboard's Hot Mainstream Rock Tracks at number 6, for the issue date of November 27, 2010 and spent 25 weeks on the chart.

The song has also charted on Billboard's Rock Songs chart peaking at number 11 for the issue date of December 11, 2010 and on Alternative Songs chart peaking at number 21 for the issue date of November 20, 2010.

This is one of the biggest commercial successes of the band, spending 19 weeks on the Rock Songs chart and 17 on the Alternative Songs chart.

== Charts ==
Chart (2010)	Peak position
US Rock Songs (Billboard)	11
US Alternative Songs (Billboard)	21
US Mainstream Rock Songs (Billboard)	6
