= Beautiful (10 Years song) =

Single by 10 Years

from the album Division
- Released: January 29, 2008
- Recorded: 2007–2008
- Length: 3:17
- Label: Universal
- Songwriters: Jesse Hasek, Brian Vodinh, Matt Wantland, Travis Wyrick
- Producer: Rick Parashar

10 Years singles chronology
"Waking Up" (2006)	"Beautiful" (2008)	"So Long, Good-Bye" (2008)

"Beautiful" is a song written and recorded by American alternative metal band 10 Years for their fourth studio album, Division, which is their second major release under Universal Records. It was released as the album's first single to iTunes and rock radio outlets in 2008.

== Chart performance ==
"Beautiful" debuted on Billboard's Hot Mainstream Rock Tracks at number 34 for the issue date of February 23, 2008. It peaked at number 6, spending 26 weeks on the chart. The song has also charted on Billboard's Hot Modern Rock Tracks, peaking at number 14.

== Music video ==
The music video for "Beautiful" premiered on April 21, 2008, at Universal Republic's video site and on YouTube a few days later. It depicts a celebrity (Rebecca Ginos) going inside her house due to the paparazzi invading and watching her every move, reminiscent of Lindsay Lohan, Paris Hilton, and Britney Spears.

== Certifications ==
Region	Certification	Certified units/sales
United States (RIAA)	Gold	500,000^{‡}
^{‡} Sales+streaming figures based on certification alone.
