= Justin McCain =

American musician, songwriter, record producer and label executive

- Born: December 18, 1979 (age 46); Omaha, Nebraska, United States
- Genre: Rock
- Occupations: Musician; songwriter; record producer
- Instruments: Guitar; vocals; drums; bass; keyboards
- Label: Sumerian
- Website: throughfiremusic.com

Justin McCain (born December 18, 1979) is an American musician, songwriter, record producer and label executive, whose songs have been collectively streamed worldwide over 450 million times. McCain is the founder, lead guitarist, songwriter and producer for the hard rock band Through Fire, signed to Sumerian Records, and also works for Sumerian doing licensing and A&R.

== Career ==
=== Emphatic and industry success ===
Early on, McCain had seen success with his first band Emphatic, releasing two records. He got the band added into rotation at local radio which led to him being contacted by management company Freeze Management/John Reese (Guns N' Roses, The Used). McCain, and people he brought in, landed the band deals with Universal Records where he worked directly with President Monte Lipman (Godsmack, 3 Doors Down) and A&R Reen Nalli (Blue October), Atlantic Records where he worked directly with Executive Vice President Pete Ganbarg (Santana, Daughtry, Halestorm), VP Steve Roberson (Shinedown, Paramore) and A&R Executive Jeff Blue (Linkin Park, Limp Bizkit, Korn), Epochal /Capitol Records, powerhouse management company In De Goot Entertainment / Bill McGathy and the elite booking agency William Morris and TKO.

McCain and his bands have toured and or shared the stage with some of today's biggest acts including Shinedown, Slipknot, Five Finger Death Punch, Korn, Rammstein, Papa Roach, Skillet, Chevelle, Halestorm, In This Moment, Sick Puppies, AlterBridge, Trapt, Blackstone Cherry, Hollywood Undead, Adelitas Way, and many more. As a producer McCain honed his skills by studying and working with multi platinum & Grammy winning producers and engineers such as Howard Benson (Daughtry, 3 Days Grace, Green Day), Chris Lord-Alge (Prince, Madonna), and Ryan Greene (Megadeth, Jay-Z). As a songwriter McCain signed to one of the biggest publishing companies in the world, Warner Chappell Music / Warner Bros. Through that deal he worked closely with songwriters who have written with artists such as Shinedown, Daughtry, Carrie Underwood, Tim McGraw and many more. McCain alone has written several songs that have seen chart success in the Top 40 at radio as well as multiple #1 singles on Octane including his current single "Stronger" which also hit #1 on iTunes.

He has seen success as a label executive working in licensing as well writing and or producing the songs that have been placed on TV and films such as WWE, MTV, Monday Night Football, Stanley Cup Finals, Criminal Minds, World Series of Fighting, Footloose, Fight Valley featuring former UFC champions Miesha Tate & Holly Holm, NBC, ESPN, Fox Sports, Comcast, and more.

=== Through Fire ===
Currently McCain is touring with his band Through Fire in support of their debut album Breathe via Sumerian Records. McCain produced and wrote most of this album, which debuted at #4 on Billboard's top new artist chart, #2 on iTunes rock charts, with the single Stronger being #1 on iTunes, as well as #1 on Octane.

=== Features and endorsements ===
He has been featured in Guitar World magazine, Revolver Magazine and more. He is endorsed by ESP Guitars, Cleartone Strings, Dunlop Picks, Affliction Clothing and RockSolid Nutrition.
