= Another Life (Emphatic album) =

Studio album by Emphatic
- Released: October 22, 2013
- Recorded: March – May 2013;
- Studio: Validus Recording Studios, Los Angeles, California
- Genre: Hard rock, alternative metal
- Length: 40:22
- Label: Epochal Artists, Capitol
- Producer: Justin McCain, Ryan Greene

Emphatic chronology
Damage (2011)	Another Life (2013)

Singles from Another Life
- 1. "Remember Me" Released: 20 August 2013

Another Life is the third and final full-length studio album by American hard rock band Emphatic, released October 22, 2013. A follow-up to their major label debut Damage by Atlantic, the album reached No. 8 on Billboard Top Heatseekers chart. It is the only Emphatic record released through Epochal Artists. It is also the only Emphatic album to feature lead singer Toryn Green.

== Background ==
Only a couple of weeks before the first single from their previous record Damage was to be released, the Emphatic vocalist Patrick Wilson fractured his larynx in a bar fight. The band waited for his return for almost a year and toured with substitute singers. The record and subsequent singles did fairly well on charts, but by Wilson's return, the momentum was gone and Emphatic was dropped from the label. Wilson quit and the rest of the band members dropped out, leaving lead guitarist and songwriter Justin McCain the only remaining original member in the band. Determined to rebuild and revamp everything, McCain signed another record deal with Epochal Artists and brought in a new singer Toryn Green (formerly of Fuel), new bassist Jesse Saint, and co-lead guitarist Bill Hudson.

In addition to an all new lineup, a lot of things were going to be different. McCain had worked with Howard Benson on Damage, but this time he wanted to produce the new album himself. After being the sole songwriter in the band for years, McCain teamed up with Green in co-writing songs. Not wanting to replicate the last album, they decided to go another direction, add musical elements that weren't tapped into previously, and not include another "Bounce" or "Get Paid" on the record. In McCain's words, lyrically the record is telling the story of the past year of his and Toryn's life.

Toryn Green brought in three songs from his own arsenal. "Time is Running Out" was previously released as a single with his former band For The Taking. "The Choice" and "Forbidden You" were performed on For The Taking live shows, but not officially released.

The record includes also collaborations with other artists. The single "Remember Me" is a co-write with "Sahaj" Ticotin of alternative metal band Ra. Tobin Esperance of Papa Roach co-wrote three tracks to the record, "Another Life", "I Don't Need You", and "Take Your Place".

The album was recorded with producer Ryan Greene at Validus Recording studios located in North Hollywood. McCain played most of the guitar parts while the new co-lead guitarist Hudson recorded guitar solos on two tracks, "Remember Me" and "Forbidden You". John Tempesta (The Cult/ex-Testament, White Zombie) was enlisted to lay down the drum tracks for the album.

== Promotion ==
"Remember Me" impacted radio on July 30, 2013, and was released as the album's lead single on August 20, 2013, entering the iTunes chart at No. 6. It peaked at No. 30 on Billboard Mainstream Rock tracks, spending 14 weeks on the chart.

Only days prior to the release of "Another Life", the album was streamed in its entirety exclusively at Revolver Magazine website.

The record release party took place at The Slowdown, Omaha on September 21, 2013.

To promote the album, Emphatic played only a handful of shows in 2013. In October 2013, a biker-themed music video for "Remember Me" was shot in Mojave Desert near Apple Valley, California, with appearances from Andrew Bryniarski (Texas Chainsaw Massacre) and Victor Newmark (John Teller from SOA), but the video was never finalized. A raw version of the band performance sequence from the videoshoot surfaced on YouTube later, but it was soon taken down.

In February 2014 the band embarked on a one-month tour with RED and Gemini Syndrome, but without the lead singer on the record, Toryn Green, and co-lead guitarist Bill Hudson, who were replaced by former Emphatic touring vocalist Grant Kendrick and another former band member Lance Dowdle on guitar. Shortly after beginning of the tour, Green announced his departure from the band, citing creative differences with founding member Justin McCain.

After completing the RED tour, McCain announced signing to Pavement Entertainment, revealing another album being in the works.

== Critical reception ==
Professional ratings
Review scores
Source	Rating
Alternative Addiction	4.5/5 stars
Starpulse	B−
Melodic Net	3.5/5 stars
Music Insider	7/10
New Noise	4/5 stars
New Transcendence	10/10
Screamer magazine	favorable
Shakefire	B−
aNewRisingMusic	5/5 stars

Another Life received generally favorable reviews from professional critics.

While Green's vocals on the record were lauded in almost every review, many critics wondered how the old fans would receive the new singer. The reviewer for New Transcendence noted that "Green's vocal style is incredibly different" from Wilson's heavier, southern style. Cody Endres for Shakefire predicts that "longtime fans of Emphatic may have a difficult time transitioning to Green", but admits that Green has "a talented voice well-suited for rock and roll". Mike Newdeck writes on his review for Alternative Addiction that "Green proves to be the main strength of the album, sounding remarkably like Patrick Wilson in places, yet adding his own distinctive personality". Andrew Hart writing for Rock Relapse describes Green as "a prototypical hard rock belter, the kind of vocalist who lends a nice twinge of gruffness to his superbly clean voice," which makes him a fine substitute for the band's last frontman.

Brian Campbell of Starpulse opines that "by the end of the tremendous opening track "Life After Anger", you should know just about all you need to know about Emphatic's Another Life. Chunky riffs, soaring vocals, and melodic hooks all coated in a glossy, radio ready sheen". However, in Campbell's opinion the album "is plagued by more than a few flat filler tracks, instances in which the band wanders too far into middle-of-the-road hard rock". Also Eric May of New Noise notes the "thundering chorus" and radio potential of "Life After Anger", and reminds his readers that "if you can't get enough of pop-laden hard rock with catchy hooks and memorable choruses, then you might want to get your hands on this album." Hart of Rock Relapse is less enthusiastic, stating that aside from the change at the head of the band, there's nothing alarmingly new about Emphatic's typical hard rock offerings: "If you’ve heard one Emphatic song, you’ve heard them all".

In his detailed review for Music Insider Magazine, Brian McKinny writes that his overall impressions are good, it never gets boring, and he enjoyed the drums and bass played on the release [by Tempesta and Bushnell], particularly on "Take Your Place" and "The Choice" which in his opinion has "all the hallmarks of a Top-40 Rock hit". On a more critical note, McKinny laments over missing or too short guitar leads, the variation of effects applied to the vocals, and calls the production work on the record too slick in places. Also Richard Rosenthal of Screamer Magazine is wondering why so very few guitar solos from a two-guitar lineup. He sees that "Another Life" is a vocal-driven album.

== Track listing ==
No.	Title	Writer(s)	Length
1.	"Life After Anger"	Tommy Henriksen, Bobby Huff, Justin McCain	3:50
2.	"Time Is Running Out"	Toryn Green, Brian Vodinh	3:41
3.	"Lights"	Johnny Andrews, Green, McCain	4:17
4.	"Some Things Never Die"	Henriksen, Huff, Claude Kelly	3:41
5.	"The Choice"	Green, Henriksen	3:36
6.	"Another Life"	Anthony Esperance, Tobin Esperance, Green, McCain	3:36
7.	"I Don't Need You"	T. Esperance, Green, McCain	3:07
8.	"Louder Than Love"	Huff, McCain	4:28
9.	"Forbidden You"	Green, Henriksen	3:28
10.	"Take Your Place"	T. Esperance, Green, McCain	3:38
11.	"Remember Me"	Green, McCain, Sahaj	3:00
Total length:			40:22

Note: All writing credits checked from BMI database.

== Personnel ==
All credits adapted from liner notes.

Record credits:

- Toryn Green - vocals
- Justin McCain - all rhythm guitars; lead guitars on "Life After Anger, "Louder Than Love", "I Don't Need You", "Take Your Place" and "Another Life"; backing vocals on "Remember Me"; keys
- Bill Hudson - guitar solo on "Remember Me" and "Forbidden You"
- John Tempesta - drums
- Paul Bushnell - bass guitar
- Mat Duazat - keys
- Jesse Saint - keys
- Justin McCain – production
- Ryan Greene - co-production, mixing
- U.E. Nastase – mastering
- Toryn Green - art direction
- Mario Sánchez Nevado - cover art
- Scotty Cheramie - graphics

== Charts ==
Chart (2013)	Peak position
US Heatseeker Albums	8
US Hard Rock Albums	22
US Independent Albums	40
