= NorthTale =

Swedish/American power metal group

- Origin: United States
- Genres: Power metal
- Years active: 2017–present
- Labels: Nuclear Blast
- Members: Guilherme Hirose; Bill Hudson; Patrick Johansonn; Jimmy Pitts; Tilen Hudrap
- Past members: Christian Eriksson; Mikael Planefeldt

NorthTale is an American power metal band formed in late 2017 and currently lined up by guitarist Bill Hudson, vocalist Guilherme Hirose, drummer Patrick Johansson, bassist Mikael Planefeldt and keyboardist Jimmy Pitts. The band teased their debut song, "Shape Your Reality", in October 2018, to positive reception. In April 2018, the band announced that they have signed with Nuclear Blast and that their debut album is entitled Welcome to Paradise. It was released on August 2, 2019.

== History ==
An early concept for the band was formed in late 2017 by Bill Hudson as a side project while he was in U.D.O. Initially, Hudson planned to release a solo album. However, shortly after Christian Eriksson's departure from Twilight Force in October 2017, Hudson took the opportunity to recruit Eriksson as the lead vocalist, and former Yngwie Malmsteen drummer Patrick Johansson. All three had previously met before, and starting a band seemed like an obvious choice. Hudson and Eriksson had formerly met in person after a festival where both U.D.O. and Twilight Force had performed, and Eriksson and Johansson became acquainted while the latter was on tour with Malmsteen in California.

To form a complete roster, Eriksson brought on fellow Swede Mikael Planefeldt, who he studied with while he was a student at the Musicians Institute in Hollywood, California. Hudson said that choosing Jimmy Pitts as keyboardist was an "easy choice," as they had previously met through mutual acquaintances while he played with Trans-Siberian Orchestra. On January 25, 2018, Eriksson officially announced the formation of a new power-metal band that would eventually become NorthTale.

The group initially did not have a permanent name, and was unsure what to call themselves. In early February of the same year, Hudson held a name contest on Facebook in which fans would have the opportunity to submit a name for the band. After over 1500 suggestions, in May 2018 the band members decided on the name NorthTale.

After Hudson split from U.D.O. in April 2018, he decided to set his focus on NorthTale full time.

In June 2020, NorthTale announced that they had parted ways with Christian Eriksson, citing musical differences regarding their second album as the main reason for his departure. In December, the band revealed their new vocalist; Guilherme Hirose from Brazilian power metal band TraumeR.

NorthTale' second studio album Eternal Flame, was released in 2021 and produced by Dennis Ward.

In July 2023, the band were joined by Tilen Hudrap as their new bassist.

== Influences ==
Bill Hudson's influences include many power metal albums from bands such as Helloween, Stratovarius, Angra, Blind Guardian, Gamma Ray, HammerFall, and Rhapsody of Fire.

== Band members ==
Current members

- Guilherme Hirose – vocals (2020–present)
- Bill Hudson – guitars (2017–present)
- Patrick Johansson – drums, percussion (2017–present)
- Jimmy Pitts – keyboards (2017–present)
- Tilen Hudrap - bass (2023–present)

Former members

- Christian Eriksson – vocals (2017–2020)
- Mikael Planefeldt – bass guitar (2017–2023)

== Discography ==
=== Studio albums ===
- Welcome to Paradise (2019)
- Eternal Flame (2021)

=== Singles ===
- "Higher" (2019)
- "Shape Your Reality" (2019)
- "Follow Me" (2021)
- "Only Human" (2021)
- "Midnight Bells" (2021)
