= Enter Deception =

Studio album by Cellador
- Released: June 27, 2006
- Genre: Power metal
- Length: 43:03
- Label: Metal Blade
- Producer: Erik Rutan

Cellador chronology
Leaving All Behind (EP) (2004)	Enter Deception (2006)

Professional ratings
Review scores
Source	Rating
AllMusic	link

Enter Deception is the debut full-length album by American power metal band Cellador.

== Track listing ==
1. "Leaving All Behind" – 3:13
2. "A Sign Far Beyond" – 5:17
3. "Never Again" – 5:13
4. "Forever Unbound" – 5:59
5. "Seen Through Time" – 7:09
6. "Wakening" – 5:19
7. "Releasing the Shadow" – 5:42
8. "No Chances Lost" – 6:31

=== Japanese edition bonus tracks ===
9. "Forever Unbound" (demo version)
10. "No Chances Lost" (demo version)

== Credits ==
- Michael Gremio – vocals
- Chris Petersen – lead and rhythm guitar
- Bill Hudson – lead guitar
- Valentin Rakhmanov – bass
- David Dahir – drums and percussion
