= The Unknown (song) =

Single by 10 Years

from the album Violent Allies
- Released: February 16, 2021
- Recorded: 2019
- Genre: Hard rock
- Length: 3:01
- Songwriters: Jesse Hasek: Brian Vodinh; Matt Wantland
- Producer: Howard Benson

10 Years singles chronology
"The Shift" (2020)	"The Unknown" (2021)

"The Unknown" is a song by American alternative metal band 10 Years. It was their second single off of their ninth studio album, Violent Allies. It peaked on the Billboard Mainstream Rock chart at number 20 in August 2021.

== Charts ==
Chart (2021)	Peak position
US Mainstream Rock (Billboard)	20
