= Violent Allies =

Studio album by 10 Years
- Released: September 18, 2020
- Recorded: 2019–2020
- Length: 36:51
- Label: Mascot
- Producer: Howard Benson

10 Years chronology
(How to Live) as Ghosts (2017)	Violent Allies (2020)

Singles from Violent Allies
- 1. "The Shift" Released: May 15, 2020; 2. "The Unknown" Released: February 16, 2021

Violent Allies is the ninth studio album by American alternative metal band 10 Years. It was released on September 18, 2020. Its first single, "The Shift", was released ahead of the album in May 2020.

== Writing and recording ==
The band began on work on the album in 2019, deciding to work with music producer Howard Benson. The band had previously worked with Benson on 2010's Feeding the Wolves, but wished to try it again, feeling that issues between band members and their record label at the time kept them from reaching their potential with working with Benson the first time around. The recording sessions began in late 2019, with the band entering the studio with Benson 20 songs already written. Much to their surprise, the sessions were much more challenging than expected, with Benson cutting 75% of the material the band had previously written. This forced the band to write new material on the spot in the studio. Guitarist Brian Vodinh elaborated on the difficult sessions:

Time spent in the studio or simply collaborating on our vision was a catalyst in reaching creative clarity like we've never had before...No matter how frustrated we get, once we looked out at it, the energy was unexplainable. Our mission was to really connect with the songs, break them down, and build them back up...The younger versions of ourselves would've been going to Hollywood every night and partying. [These sessions were] different...All we cared about was writing and recording the best song we possibly could. We felt like we had something to prove.

== Themes and composition ==
The album's title, Violent Allies, has a dual meaning, representing both the band's strong determination to work together to create a meaningful album, and an allusion to the divisiveness present in modern social and political issues. The latter is a recurring theme across much of the album, and the album's lead single "The Shift". While "The Shift" also contains multiple allusions to the "spreading of a virus," the song was written in late 2019, prior to the Coronavirus outbreak.

== Release and promotion ==
The album's first single, "The Shift", was first released on May 15, 2020, well in advance of the album, which, at the time, was untitled and had no release date, due to the uncertainty in regards to the COVID-19 pandemic. The album's title, Violent Allies, and its release date, September 18, 2020 were announced in mid-July, alongside a new promotional song titled "The Unknown".

== Track listing ==
Violent Allies track listing
No.	Title	Length
1.	"The Shift"	3:01
2.	"The Unknown"	3:01
3.	"Waiting"	3:39
4.	"Déjà Vu"	2:40
5.	"Without You"	3:30
6.	"Cut the Cord"	2:49
7.	"Planets III"	2:26
8.	"Sleep in the Fire"	3:09
9.	"I Wish"	3:31
10.	"Start Again"	2:58
11.	"Planets IV"	1:57
12.	"Say Goodbye"	4:10
Total length:		36:51

== Personnel ==
10 Years

- Jesse Hasek – lead vocals
- Brian Vodinh – guitar, bass, drums, backing vocals, keys, programming
- Matt Wantland – guitar

Production

- Howard Benson – production
- Joe Rickard – mixing

== Charts ==
Chart (2020)	Peak position
US Top Album Sales (Billboard)	29
US Top Hard Rock Albums (Billboard)	18
