= Leaving All Behind =

EP by Cellador
- Released: May 15, 2005
- Genre: Power metal
- Length: 23:19
- Producer: Chris Peterson

Cellador chronology
Leaving All Behind (2005)	Enter Deception (2006)

Leaving All Behind is an EP/demo by American power metal band Cellador.

== Track listing ==
1. "Leaving All Behind" – 3:13
2. "Seen Through Time" – 7:09
3. "Forever Unbound" – 5:59
4. "No Chances Lost" – 6:31

== Credits ==
- Michael Gremio – vocals
- Chris Petersen – guitars
- Sam Chatham – guitars
- Valentin Rakhmanov – bass
- David Dahir – drums, percussion

=== Additional information ===
- A drum machine was used on all tracks.
- Michael Gremio was still known as Michael Smith Jr. at the time of recording.
- All songs written by Chris Petersen except track 4 by Petersen and Josh Krohn.
