= (How to Live) as Ghosts =

Studio album by 10 Years
- Released: October 27, 2017
- Recorded: 2016–2017
- Studio: Rock Falcon Studios, Nashville, Tennessee
- Genre: Alternative rock; hard rock
- Length: 40:31
- Label: Mascot
- Producer: Nick Raskulinecz

10 Years chronology
From Birth to Burial (2015)	(How to Live) as Ghosts (2017)	Violent Allies (2020)

Singles from (How to Live) as Ghosts
- 1. "Novacaine" Released: August 16, 2017; 2. "Burnout" Released: April 23, 2018; 3. "Ghosts" Released: January 22, 2019

(How to Live) as Ghosts is the eighth studio album by American alternative metal band 10 Years. While their prior album, From Birth to Burial alluded to the band's plan at the time for it to be their final album, (How to Live) as Ghosts alludes to the sentiment of it being a rebirth of a band, while also alluding to the general sentiment that humanity spends too much time worrying about death rather than life. The album's first single, "Novacaine", was released in August 2017. The second single, "Burnout", was released on April 23, 2018.

== Background ==
In 2015, the band released their seventh studio album, From Birth to Burial, deriving from the fact that frontman and lead vocalist Jesse Hasek believed it to be the band's final album. The sessions for the prior album had been difficult for the band, with long-time members Matt Wantland and Brian Vodinh leaving in 2013, after over a decade of involvement in the band, with Hasek conceding that it "just didn't feel like 10 Years without [them]." However, Hasek reconnected with the two after the release of the prior album, and after rejoining, began work on a new album in 2016.

== Writing and recording ==
For the first time since 2008's Division, the album's core writing team again consisted of Hasek, Vodinh, and Wantland again. However, this time they approached writing differently; historically, Hasek and Vodinh would do the bulk of the writing together, and then have the rest of the band members add minor nuances to the songs. For (How to Live) as Ghosts, all of the music was written as a full-band and collaborating with music producer Nick Raskulinecz. Vodinh provided guitar and drums for the album, relegating newcomer Kyle Mayer as merely the live drummer for touring. The track "Blood Red Sky" originated from a solo EP recorded by Vodinh, but was reworked by Hasek to have a vastly different vocal approach.

== Themes and composition ==
Working with Raskulinecz for the first time lead to the band changing a number of aspects of the music. Past albums focused on layering and harmonizing Hasek's vocals for a more "epic" feel, though Raskulinecz encouraged Hasek to move away from that, stripping it down to just one unaltered vocal track for much of the album, in an effort for the vocals to feel more "intimate" and "human". Similarly, Hasek moved away from the abstract themes of his lyrics, to more direct themes:

In the past, I've written a lot of songs that were pretty ambiguous. But on this record, I'm more comfortable being direct and talking about things that are important to me. I'm older and find myself reflecting on the world more especially after having travelled the world and talk to people and really see what's going on...seeing all the political, social, and religious turmoil, it had me thinking about how many people are judging and preparing for death, but are actually missing life. And, instead of using spirituality for good, a lot of people use it to point fingers and judge. Instead of worrying where we end up in the end, we need to focus on the now and the humanity.

Some lyrics were also more upbeat than prior albums, with the band feeling like the recording sessions had been a "rebirth" for the band, feeling more positive about their musical future.

== Release and promotion ==
In December 2016, the band announced that they had signed with Mascot Records of Mascot Label Group, to release their album. The album's name was first announced on August 16, 2017, alongside the track list, and the album's first single, "Novacaine". The song peaked at number 5 on the Billboard US Mainstream Rock Songs chart. Touring in support of the album started prior to its release as well, including a one-off show in August, and then starting with more regular shows in September.

== Track listing ==
(How to Live) as Ghosts
No.	Title	Length
1.	"The Messenger"	3:31
2.	"Novacaine"	2:50
3.	"Burnout"	3:34
4.	"Catacombs"	3:34
5.	"Ghosts"	4:08
6.	"Blood Red Sky"	3:10
7.	"Phantoms"	4:14
8.	"Vampires"	3:57
9.	"Halos"	3:53
10.	"Lucky You"	3:38
11.	"Insomnia"	4:02
Total length:		40:31

Best Buy bonus tracks
No.	Title	Length
12.	"Heart-Shaped Box" (Nirvana cover)	5:17
13.	"Telescreen" (Vampires Demo Version)	3:25
14.	"Novacaine" (Redbird Remix)	3:31

Digital deluxe edition
No.	Title	Length
12.	"Heart Shaped Box" (Nirvana cover)	5:17
13.	"Telescreen" (Vampires early demo-alt Version)	3:25
14.	"Novacaine" (Redbird Remix)	3:31
15.	"Losing My Religion" (R.E.M. cover)	4:39

== Personnel ==
10 Years

- Jesse Hasek – vocals
- Brian Vodinh – guitar, bass, drums, backing vocals, keys, programming
- Matt Wantland – guitar

Production

- Nick Raskulinecz – production
- Nathan Yarborough – audio engineer
- Eric Ratz – mixing
- Justin Shturtz – audio mastering

== Charts ==
Chart (2017)	Peak position
US Billboard 200	92
US Independent Albums (Billboard)	8
US Top Alternative Albums (Billboard)	10
US Top Hard Rock Albums (Billboard)	5
US Top Rock Albums (Billboard)	14
