= Actions & Motives =

Single by 10 Years

from the album Division
- Released: May 24, 2009
- Recorded: 2007–2008
- Genre: Alternative metal
- Length: 3:24
- Label: Universal
- Songwriters: Jesse Hasek, Ryan Johnson, Brian Vodinh, Matt Wantland
- Producer: Rick Parashar

10 Years singles chronology
"So Long, Good-Bye" (2008)	"Actions & Motives" (2009)	"Shoot It Out" (2010)

"Actions & Motives" is the third single by American alternative metal band 10 Years. It was released on their fourth studio album, and second major label release, Division. This song peaked at No. 36 on the Billboard Mainstream Rock Tracks chart.

== Single release ==
On May 24, 2009, an EP for Actions & Motives was released. It has a promotional video for the song, a live, acoustic version of the track "Russian Roulette", along with "Actions & Motives" itself. On the band's MySpace blog, they stated it was an economic stimulus deal.

== Track listing ==
No.	Title	Length
1.	"Actions & Motives"	3:23
2.	"Actions & Motives" (Promotional video)	2:04
3.	"Russian Roulette" (Live acoustic version)	3:37
