= Cellador =

American power metal band

- Origin: Omaha, Nebraska, U.S.
- Genres: Power metal, speed metal, heavy metal
- Years active: 2002–present
- Labels: Metal Blade, Scarlet Records
- Members: Chris Petersen; Diego Valadez; Nick McCallister; Eric Meyers
- Past members: Josh Krohn; Andy Warren; Albert Kurniawan; Sam Chatham; Valentin Rakhmanov; Dave Dahir; Bill Hudson; Michael Gremio; Rick Halverson; Mika Horiuchi; Yord; Caleb Delaet; James Pickett; Chris Davila
- Website: cellador.com

Cellador is an American power metal band from Omaha, Nebraska, based in Denver, Colorado. The band was founded in 2002 by Josh Krohn and Chris Petersen, the band's primary songwriter, as a response to the American Midwest metalcore and death metal. Andy Warren joined as lead singer. Drummer Albert Kurniawan joined soon after. The lineup has changed since its inception, and now comprises Petersen, drummer Nick McCallister, keyboardist Diego Valadez, and guitarist Eric Meyers. In 2005, the band signed to Metal Blade Records after a show with The Black Dahlia Murder.

== Biography ==
Cellador's debut album Enter Deception was released in 2006. The band recorded the album at Erik Rutan's Mana Studios. In an article from the December 2006 issue of Metal Maniacs magazine, Chris Petersen said the band name refers to a J. R. R. Tolkien essay, which stated that the two words cellar and door have an appealing sound when combined. Petersen said that the band was called "Apostate", but they changed the name to Cellador because it was more fitting.

Cellador has toured the United States, Canada and Mexico with Trivium, Bullet for My Valentine, All that Remains, Protest the Hero, The Human Abstract, The Sword, Behemoth, and Sonata Arctica. They have performed at the ProgPower USA festival in Atlanta, Georgia, as well as the LoudPark festival in Japan, among others.

The band went on hiatus in 2009 after several members left the band. In 2011, after two years without updates, the band released four demo songs online from their EP Honor Forth. The band held auditions during 2009–2012, and reformed with bass player James Pickett, drummer Nick Mccallister, keyboardist Diego Valadez, and guitarist Caleb Delaet. Petersen officially became lead vocalist in 2012.

In December 2012, the band announced live shows beginning in 2013. They spent the year settling in the Colorado area, and opening for Havok, Into Eternity, Helloween, Shining, Vale of Pnath, Amaranthe, and others.

In early 2014, Delaet left the band. Afterwards, the band began recording their second LP, Off the Grid, for which Petersen recorded all guitars. Recording for the album finished in the summer of 2015. In late 2015, Eric Meyers was brought in as second guitarist. Afterwards, they played Denver shows for the remainder of the year. In 2016, Cellador opened for Huntress, Anvil, Queensrÿche, and more. During the summer of 2016, bassist James Pickett left the band. Shortly thereafter, Cellador signed with Italian label Scarlet Records.

In 2017, bassist Chris Davila was temporarily brought in to help with the promotion for their then-upcoming album, such as performing in live shows and a music video. Off the Grid was officially released on March 10. After their second LP release, Cellador shot a music video for the singles "Break Heresy." They opened for Yngwie Malmsteen, and played the 2017 Evoken Music Festival in Tokyo and Osaka, Japan. The band was writing and recording a third album.

== Band members ==
=== Current members ===
- Chris Petersen – guitar, vocals (2004–present)
- Diego Valadez – synths (2011–present)
- Nick McCallister – drums (2011–present)
- Eric Meyers – guitar (2015–present)

=== Former members ===
- Josh Krohn - bass (2002-2004)
- Andy Warren - vocals (2002-2004)
- Albert Kurniawan - drums (2002-2004)
- Sam Chatham – guitar (2004–2005)
- Valentin Rakhmanov – bass (2004–2007)
- Dave Dahir – drums (2004–2007, 2007–2009)
- Bill Hudson – guitar (2005–2008)
- Michael Gremio – vocals (2005–2009)
- Rick Halverson – drums (2007)
- Mika Horiuchi – bass (2007–2009)
- Yord – guitar (2008–2009)
- Caleb Delaet – guitar (2012–2014)
- James Pickett – bass (2011–2016)
- Chris Davila – bass (2017–2018)

== Discography ==
- The Burning Blue (Demo) (2004)
- Leaving All Behind (EP) (2005)
- Enter Deception (2006)
- Honor Forth (EP) (2011)
- Off the Grid (2017)
