= Brian Werner =

American conservationist

Brian Werner (Brian M W Ferris) is an American conservationist and the founder of the Tiger Missing Link Foundation and the Tiger Creek wildlife refuge. He participated in the first genetic study of tigers, published in Riding The Tiger (Cambridge University Press, 1999). He was involved with the first open heart surgery performed on a tiger.

With his family, Werner was featured internationally on the Animal Planet show Growing Up Tiger.
