= The Autumn Effect =

Studio album by 10 Years
- Released: August 16, 2005
- Recorded: 2005
- Studio: Pulse Recording (Los Angeles)
- Genres: Alternative metal; nu metal
- Length: 47:25
- Labels: Republic; Universal
- Producer: Josh Abraham

10 Years chronology
Killing All That Holds You (2004)	The Autumn Effect (2005)	Division (2008)

Singles from The Autumn Effect
- 1. "Wasteland" Released: June 7, 2005; 2. "Through the Iris" Released: March 21, 2006; 3. "Waking Up" Released: September 19, 2006

Professional ratings
Review scores
Source	Rating
AllMusic	2.5/5 stars

The Autumn Effect is the third studio album and major label debut by American alternative metal band 10 Years. It was released on August 16, 2005, by Republic and Universal Records. Featured on the album is the popular modern rock track "Wasteland" and two other singles: "Through the Iris" and "Waking Up".

Due to the success of "Wasteland", The Autumn Effect broke 10 Years into the mainstream and as of December 6, 2017, the album was certified gold by the Recording Industry Association of America (RIAA).

== Album information ==
The album peaked at number 72 on the Billboard 200, and made a re-entry into the top 100 of the chart, based on the growing mainstream success of the single "Wasteland". The album as a whole has been frequently compared to the work of Tool, Deftones, and, to a lesser extent, Incubus.

Slightly different versions of the songs "Wasteland", "Through the Iris", and "Insects" all appeared on the 2004 album Killing All That Holds You.

The hidden track "Slowly Falling Awake" is after "The Autumn Effect", however not as a separate track.

There are two instrumental pieces in negative time prior to "Wasteland" and "Empires". They will automatically be played if the tracks prior to Wasteland and Empires ("Cast It Out" and "Through the Iris", respectively) are played. If played from an MP3 device or computer, these instrumental pieces will be on the same track as "Cast It Out" and "Through the Iris" and play after the songs are over.

== Track listing ==
No.	Title	Lyrics	Music	Length
1.	"Waking Up"	Hasek, Vodinh	Lewis Cosby, Ryan "Tater" Johnson, Vodinh, Matt Wantland	3:13
2.	"Fault Line"	Hasek	Vodinh	3:50
3.	"The Recipe"	Hasek	Cosby, Johnson, Vodinh, Wantland	3:36
4.	"Cast It Out"	Hasek, Vodinh	Vodinh	3:18
5.	"Wasteland"	Hasek	Johnson, Vodinh, Wantland	3:49
6.	"Seasons to Cycles"	Hasek, Vodinh	Vodinh	3:52
7.	"Half Life"	Hasek	Cosby, Johnson, Vodinh, Wantland	4:16
8.	"Through the Iris"	Hasek	Vodinh	3:30
9.	"Empires"	Hasek	Vodinh	2:41
10.	"Prey"	Hasek	Cosby, Johnson, Vodinh, Wantland	3:01
11.	"Insects"	Hasek	Vodinh	4:21
12.	"Paralyzing Kings"	Hasek	Vodinh	3:49
13.	"The Autumn Effect"	Hasek	Cosby, Johnson, Vodinh, Wantland	4:09
Total length:				47:25

Bonus tracks
No.	Title	Length
14.	"The Autumn Effect" (Piano version; Japan & iTunes bonus track)	4:22
15.	"Pacemaker" (Best Buy exclusive)	3:42

Original Release tracks
No.	Title	Length
4.	"Cast It Out" (With instrumental)	5:35
8.	"Through the Iris" (With instrumental)	5:41
13.	"The Autumn Effect" (With "Slowly Falling Awake")	9:32

Note

- The Compact Disc release has the songs "Cast It Out" and "Through the Iris" with instrumentals at the end of each song, plus "Slowly Falling Awake" at the end of "The Autumn Effect". The digital download versions of the album (including the iTunes version) do not include these instrumentals or "Slowly Falling Awake".

== Personnel ==
10 Years

- Jesse Hasek – lead vocals
- Ryan "Tater" Johnson – lead guitar, backing vocals
- Matt Wantland – rhythm guitar
- Lewis "Big Lew" Cosby – bass
- Brian Vodinh – drums, backing vocals

Additional musicians

- Michael Harrison – violin
- Ruth Brugger-Johnson – violin
- Novi Novog – viola
- Nancy Stein-Ross – cello
- Rick Bemis – double bass

Production

- Josh Abraham – producer
- Ryan Williams – sound engineer, mixing
- Tom Baker – mastering
- Ross Garfield – drum technician
- Brett Allen – guitar technician

Artwork

- Travis Stevens – art direction, photography
- Dean Karr – photography
- Carol Farneti – foster humming bird photography

Management

- Adrian Vallera – A&R
- Anthony Rollo – A&R For Universal Records
- Michael Ullman – business management for Platinum Financial Management, Inc.
- Christian L. Castle, Esq. – legal representation
- Adrian Vallera, Dean Cramer, Steve Ross – worldwide management
- Michael Arfin – worldwide booking agent for Artist Group International
- Dave Kirby – european booking agent for The Agency Group

== Charts ==
=== Album ===
Chart (2005)	Peak position
US Billboard 200	72
US Billboard Top Heatseekers	1

=== Singles ===
Year	Single	Chart	Position
2005	"Wasteland"	US Billboard Hot 100	94
2005	"Wasteland"	US Billboard Modern Rock Tracks	1
2005	"Wasteland"	US Billboard Mainstream Rock Tracks	2
2006	"Through the Iris"	German Singles Chart	84
2006	"Through the Iris"	US Billboard Modern Rock Tracks	35
2006	"Through the Iris"	US Billboard Mainstream Rock Tracks	20
2006	"Waking Up"	US Billboard Mainstream Rock Tracks	32

== Certifications ==
Region	Certification	Certified units/sales
United States (RIAA)	Gold	500,000^{‡}
^{‡} Sales+streaming figures based on certification alone.
