= Fix Me (song) =

Single by 10 Years

from the album Feeding the Wolves
- Released: February 1, 2011
- Recorded: 2010
- Length: 3:36
- Label: Universal Republic
- Songwriters: Dave Bassett, Lewis Cosby, Jesse Hasek, Ryan Johnson, Brian Vodinh
- Producer: Howard Benson

10 Years singles chronology
"Shoot It Out" (2010)	"Fix Me" (2011)	"Now Is the Time (Ravenous)" (2011)

"Fix Me" is a song by American alternative metal band 10 Years, released as the second single from their fifth studio album, Feeding the Wolves (2010).

== Music video ==
On June 17 and 18, the band shot a music video for "Fix Me" in Columbus, Ohio with production company Thunder Down Country. The video was released via YouTube on August 9, 2011. The video depicts the band in a karaoke bar playing as various different characters. As the video continues, the characters get into a fight with one another.

== Charts ==
Chart (2011)	Peak position
US Rock Songs	24
US Alternative Songs	30

== Certifications ==
Region	Certification	Certified units/sales
United States (RIAA)	Gold	500,000^{‡}
^{‡} Sales+streaming figures based on certification alone.
