= Through the Iris =

Single by 10 Years

from the album The Autumn Effect
- Released: March 21, 2006
- Recorded: 2005 at Pulse Recording, Los Angeles, California
- Length: 3:30
- Label: Universal, Republic
- Songwriters: Jesse Hasek, Brian Vodinh
- Producer: Josh Abraham

10 Years singles chronology
"Wasteland" (2005)	"Through the Iris" (2006)	"Waking Up" (2006)

"Through the Iris" is a single released by American alternative metal band 10 Years in 2006. It is the second single released and track 8 from their first major release, The Autumn Effect. It was released for radio only, as there was no CD single.

Like the previous single, the song was also originally released on Killing All That Holds You, the band's second independent album, produced by Travis Wyrick. The album was eventually reissued with four acoustic tracks. The acoustic tracks were recorded live by Mike D. for Lakeside Studios. It was track 2 and clocked in at 3:23.

== Track listing ==
1. "Through the Iris" – 3:30

== Charts ==
Chart (2006)	Peak position
German Singles Chart	84
US Alt.	35
US Main.	20
