= Killing All That Holds You =

Studio album by 10 Years
- Released: October 19, 2004
- Studio: Lakeside (Knoxville, Tennessee)
- Genre: Alternative metal
- Length: 55:10
- Label: Self-released
- Producers: Travis Wyrick; 10 Years

10 Years chronology
| Into the Half Moon (2001) | Killing All That Holds You (2004) | The Autumn Effect (2005) |

reissue cover
- Artwork from the reissue sold at 10 Years concerts.

Killing All That Holds You is the second studio album by American alternative metal band 10 Years, released in 2004 with new vocalist Jesse Hasek. Although it was not widely distributed, the band sold it at their live shows, and an autographed copy was available on their webstore. The album had been abbreviated as "K.A.T.H.Y". This, along with the band's debut album Into the Half Moon, has not been released on Spotify. However, both Killing All That Holds You and Into the Half Moon can be found on YouTube.

According to vocalist Jesse Hasek, Universal Records originally thought the band would re-record Killing All That Holds You for its major-label debut. However, the band recorded an entirely new album with re-recorded versions of "Wasteland" and "Through the Iris."

== Track listing ==
| No. | Title | Length |
|---|---|---|
| 1. | "Wasteland" | 3:49 |
| 2. | "Through the Iris" | 3:33 |
| 3. | "Seven" | 3:50 |
| 4. | "R.E.S.T." | 3:48 |
| 5. | "Blank Shell" | 3:30 |
| 6. | "At a Loss" | 3:29 |
| 7. | "Silhouette of a Life" | 4:43 |
| 8. | "All White" | 4:30 |
| 9. | "Magna-Phi" | 3:09 |
| 10. | "Frailty" | 3:57 |
| 11. | "Wasteland" (Live Acoustic) | 5:07 |
| 12. | "Through the Iris" (Live Acoustic) | 3:55 |
| 13. | "Shelter" (Live Acoustic) | 4:03 |
| 14. | "In-sects" (Live Acoustic) | 3:47 |

Notes

- Tracks 11–14 were recorded live at Disc Exchange West in Knoxville, TN on August 27, 2004.
- Re-recorded versions of "Wasteland" and "Through the Iris" appear on their follow-up album and major-label debut, The Autumn Effect; the same record also features a studio version of "Insects."
- "Silhouette of a Life" was included as a bonus track for the deluxe edition of Feeding the Wolves.

== Personnel ==
10 Years

- Jesse Hasek – vocals
- Ryan "Tater" Johnson – guitar
- Matt Wantland – guitar (tracks 1–10)
- Lewis "Big Lew" Cosby – bass
- Brian Vodinh – drums, guitar (tracks 11–14)

Production

- Travis Wyrick – production (tracks 1–10), mixing (tracks 1, 4, 6–8)
- 10 Years – production (tracks 11–14)
- Ulrich Wild – mixing (tracks 2, 3, 5, 10)
- Mike Dearing – mixing (track 9)
