= Minus the Machine =

Studio album by 10 Years
- Released: August 7, 2012
- Recorded: 2011–2012
- Studio: Kashmir Recording (Knoxville, Tennessee)
- Genre: Alternative metal
- Length: 44:06
- Label: Palehorse
- Producers: 10 Years, Brian Vodinh

10 Years studio album chronology
Feeding the Wolves (2010)	Minus the Machine (2012)	From Birth to Burial (2015)

Singles from Minus The Machine
- 1. "Backlash" Released: June 19, 2012; 2. "Dancing with the Dead" Released: November 19, 2012; 3. "Minus the Machine" Released: June 21, 2013

Minus the Machine is the sixth studio album by American alternative metal band 10 Years. It was released on August 7, 2012 through their own independent label called Palehorse Records, which is a part of Warner Music Group's Independent Label Group. Lead singer, Jesse Hasek, spoke about the album saying "We wanted to create an album that has no boundaries." He continues by saying, "When you feel like you're being told to go through motions and jump through hoops, it takes the heart out of it. It's better to do what comes naturally and then figure out the after-effect."

The album debuted at No. 26 on the Billboard 200, No. 8 on the Top Rock Albums chart and No. 2 on Hard Rock Albums chart, selling 12,000 copies in the first week. The album has sold 45,000 copies in the US as of April 2015.

== History ==
On April 2, 2012, 10 Years officially announced that they had been recording their latest album, Minus the Machine, which was initially set for a release date of July 17, 2012. Later, the band announced that they would be moving the release date back two weeks and would instead be releasing it on July 31, 2012. Shortly after, the date was moved to August 7, 2012. On July 15, 2012, the album became available for pre-order on iTunes.

On July 12, 2012, the song "Knives" was uploaded to the official 10 Years YouTube with footage of the band touring.

On May 26, the band had been recorded performing two shows in a row on YouTube, as they played two songs from the album for the first time: "Backlash" and the title track "Minus the Machine."

On June 19, 10 Years officially released their first single, "Backlash", on radio.

On August 6, 10 Years released an online stream of their new album on AOL Music.

On October 26, 10 Years officially announced their second single, "Dancing with the Dead".

On June 21, 2013, the band officially announced through their Facebook page that the third single from the album would be "Minus the Machine".

== Track listing ==
All lyrics are written by Jesse Hasek; all music is composed by 10 Years.

Minus the Machine
No.	Title	Length
1.	"Minus the Machine"	3:42
2.	"Battle Lust"	2:56
3.	"Forever Fields (Sowing Season)"	3:13
4.	"Backlash"	3:37
5.	"Writing on the Walls"	4:20
6.	"Dancing with the Dead"	3:40
7.	"Sleeper"	4:02
8.	"Soma"	3:25
9.	"Tightrope"	4:14
10.	"Knives"	3:42
11.	"Birth--Death"	1:16
12.	"...And All the Other Colors"	5:17
Total length:		44:06

Digital Deluxe edition
No.	Title	Length
13.	"Baptized in Fire"	3:19
14.	"Backlash (Acoustic)"	4:32
15.	"Soma (Acoustic)"	4:18
Total length:		56:15

== Personnel ==
- Jesse Hasek – lead vocals
- Brian Vodinh – guitar, drums, programming, keys, backing vocals, production, mixing
- Ryan "Tater" Johnson – guitar, backing vocals
- Lewis "Big Lew" Cosby – bass

== Trivia ==
- The songs "Tightrope" and "Baptized in Fire" share the same verses.
