= Through Fire =

American rock band from Omaha, Nebraska

- Origin: Omaha, Nebraska, U.S.
- Genres: Hard rock; alternative metal; post-grunge
- Years active: 2015–present
- Label: Sumerian
- Members: Grant Joshua Kendrick; Kyle LeBlanc; Tyler Halverson; Zach Halverson
- Past members: Justin McCain; Patrick Mussack; Jesse "Saint" Nunn; Grant Brooks
- Website: throughfiremusic.com

Through Fire is an American rock band from Omaha, Nebraska, founded in 2015 by songwriter, guitarist and producer Justin McCain and currently consists of vocalist Grant Joshua Kendrick, twins Tyler and Zach Halverson on guitar and drums respectively, and Kyle LeBlanc on bass. They signed a deal with Sumerian Records and released their debut record in 2016. Their debut single "Stronger" reached number 29 on the mainstream rock chart.

== History ==
In December 2015 Justin McCain, the founder of Emphatic, announced his new band "Through Fire", with Grant Joshua Kendrick on vocals, Patrick Mussack on drum, and Jesse Saint on bass. He also announced that a new album will be released in 2016. Through Fire embarked on tour with Adelitas Way for Jan/Feb 2016, a tour with Nonpoint July/Aug 2016, and have scheduled a Fall run with Sick Puppies for Sept/Oct 2016. "Stronger" was the official theme to WWE's Backlash 2016 Pay Per View.

The band announced signing to Sumerian and debuted the music video to their first single as Through Fire, "Stronger", on January 29, 2016. It was released on iTunes on February 5, 2016. and reached #1 on iTunes, as well as #1 on Octane. Stronger was aired on the Stanley Cup Finals and was also used in the trailer for the 2016 action, drama film Fight Valley featuring former UFC champions Miesha Tate, Holly Holm & Cyborg.

The band's debut album Breathe was released on July 1, 2016, and debuted at #4 on Billboard's Heatseekers Albums chart.

Saint switched from bass to rhythm guitar in 2015, and the band recruited Kyle Leblanc to fill his former role. This lineup lasted for about five months before Saint and Mussack both departed the group. The band returned to a four piece with the addition Grant Brooks.

The band released their second studio album, All Animal on July 19, 2019 and reached #11 on the U.S. Heatseekers and #36 on U.S. Independents.

Brooks would leave the band towards the end of 2021 to join Fozzy. Soon after, Leblanc would also depart and the band would bring in brothers Tyler and Zach Halverson on bass and drums on August 4, 2022, marking the current lineup of the group. The next day, on August 5, the band announced a tour with the lineup with Drowning Pool called Strike a Nerve Tour.

In 2023, Kyle LeBlanc returned to the band and founder Justin McCain stopped touring for personal reasons.

The band performed their final show on May 17th, 2025 at Omaha, Nebraska's The Waiting Room. This event marks the conclusion of their journey after a decade of adventures and memories.

== Band members ==
Members

- Grant Joshua Kendrick – lead vocals (2015–present)
- Kyle LeBlanc – bass, backing vocals (2017–2022; 2023–present)
- Tyler Halverson – lead guitar (2023–present); backing vocals (2022–present); bass (2022–2023)
- Zach Halverson – drums, percussion (2022–present)

Former members

- Justin McCain – lead guitar, backing vocals (2015–2023)
- Patrick Mussack – drums, percussion (2015–2017)
- Jesse Saint – bass, backing vocals (2015–2017); rhythm guitar (2017)
- Grant Brooks – drums, percussion (2017–2021)

== Discography ==
=== Studio albums ===
Year	Album details	Peak chart positions			
Year	Album details	US Heat.	US Hard	US Ind.	US Rock
2016	Breathe: Released: July 1, 2016; Label: Sumerian	4	7	15	25
2019	All Animal: Released: July 19, 2019; Label: Sumerian	11	—	36	—
2023	Devil's Got You Dreamin': Released: April 21, 2023; Label: Sumerian	—	—	—	—

=== Singles ===
Year	Song	Peak chart positions		Album
Year	Song	US Main.	Rock Airplay	Album
2016	"Stronger"	29	—	Breathe
2016	"Breathe"	13	39	Breathe
2017	"Where You Lie"	22	—	Breathe
2019	"All Animal"	26	—	All Animal
2019	"Listen to Your Heart"	32	—	All Animal
2020	"Doubt"	27	—	All Animal
2023	"Lose It"	32	—	Devil's Got You Dreamin'

=== Promotional singles ===
Song	Year	Album
"Medicine"	2019	All Animal
"Karma Kills"	2022	Devil's Got You Dreamin'
"Devolution"	2023	Devil's Got You Dreamin'
"Over the Influence"	2023	Devil's Got You Dreamin'

=== Music videos ===
List of music videos, showing year released and directors
Title	Year	Director(s)
"Stronger"	2016	Unknown
"Breathe"	2016	Steven Contreras
"Where You Lie"	2017	Steven Contreras
"Medicine"	2019	Ed Shiers
"Listen to Your Heart"	2019	Ed Shiers
"Doubt"	2020	Marco Pavone
"Karma Kills"	2022	J.T. Ibanez
"Lose It"	2023	J.T. Ibanez
"The Road"	2023	from live footage broadcast
