= Burnout (10 Years song) =

Single by 10 Years

from the album (How to Live) As Ghosts
- Released: September 19, 2017
- Recorded: 2016–2017
- Genre: Hard rock, alternative rock
- Length: 3:34
- Label: Mascot
- Songwriters: Jesse Hasek; Chad Huff; Brian Vodinh; Matt Wantland

10 Years singles chronology
"Novacaine" (2017)	"Burnout" (2017)	"Ghosts" (2019)

"Burnout" is a song by American alternative metal band 10 Years. It was released as the second single off of their eighth studio album (How to Live) As Ghosts on Mascot Records. It was sent to Mainstream Rock radio on June 4, 2018.

== Background ==
The song was first released on September 19, 2017, and was later serviced to Mainstream Rock radio on June 4, 2018. It serves as the follow-up to the lead single, "Novacaine", which reached the Top 5 on Billboard Mainstream Rock songs earlier in the year.

Before the song's release as a single, it had registered more than five million streams across various platforms.

Lyrically, the song is about not getting too caught up in one's self to see the opportunities that the world has to offer.

== Music video ==
The song's music video was directed by Robert John Kley in Las Vegas. Describing its concept to Billboard Magazine, 10 Years drummer Brian Vodinh stated: "It's talking about someone who was in the circle for a long time, then is all of a sudden out of the circle. It's not really meant to be ugly; Because we had just gotten out of that situation it was something that was just on our minds and very much a part of the early writing sessions of this album, so it naturally made its way into the songwriting a bit. And I think the video is an honest depiction of the song and why we wrote it."

The video premiered on Billboard on May 10, 2018.

== Personnel ==
10 Years

- Jesse Hasek – vocals
- Brian Vodinh – guitar, drums
- Matt Wantland - guitar
- Chad Huff - bass

Production

- Nick Raskulinecz - production
- Ron Burman - A&R

== Charts ==
Chart (2018)	Peak position
US Mainstream Rock (Billboard)	21
