= Wasteland (10 Years song) =

Promotional single by 10 Years

from the album The Autumn Effect
- Released: 2005
- Genre: Alternative rock
- Length: 3:49
- Label: Universal; Republic
- Songwriters: Jesse Hasek; Ryan Johnson; Brian Vodinh; Matt Wantland
- Producer: Josh Abraham

10 Years singles chronology
"Wasteland" (2005)	"Through the Iris" (2006)

"Wasteland" is a song by American alternative metal band 10 Years. It was released as a promotional single from their third studio album and major label debut, The Autumn Effect (2005). The song reached No. 1 on Billboard's Modern Rock Tracks chart in February 2006 during its twenty-seventh week on the chart, making it one of the slowest-rising number-one singles in the chart's history. It also spent an unprecedented ten weeks at No. 2 on Billboard's Mainstream Rock chart. In March 2026, the RIAA gave "Wasteland" a double-platinum certification.

The song was originally featured on the band's independent second album, Killing All That Holds You (2004), produced by Travis Wyrick.

== Music videos ==
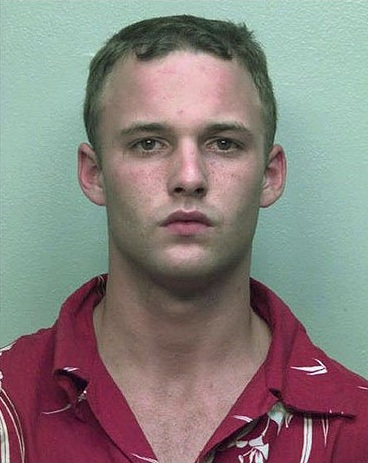
Actor Brad Renfro stars in the music video.

The first music video was a representation of the song and featured Jesse Hasek's cousin actor, Brad Renfro, who, having had a long struggle with drug abuse, was the inspiration for the song. It was directed by Scott Lee.

A second music video was a metaphorical representation using a fish flopping around on a dry lake bed. Directed by Chris Simms, this version can only be seen online.

The third and final music video released for the song addressed the social problem of human rights around the world, showing various victims of human rights violations. This video was directed by Kevin Kerslake for Amnesty International. The video received nominations for Best Direction and Best Art Direction at the 2006 MTV Video Music Awards.

The first and second music videos used the recording of the song from Killing All That Holds You, while the final video used the re-recorded version from The Autumn Effect.

== Track listing ==
US promo CD
No.	Title	Length
1.	"Wasteland"	3:52

Australian promo CDr
No.	Title	Length
1.	"Wasteland" (Album version)	3:49
2.	"Wasteland" (Acoustic version)	5:08

== Charts ==
=== Weekly charts ===
Weekly chart performance for "Wasteland"
Chart (2005–2006)	Peak position
US Billboard Hot 100	94
US Alternative Airplay (Billboard)	1
US Mainstream Rock (Billboard)	2

=== Year-end charts ===
2005 year-end chart performance for "Wasteland"
Chart (2005)	Position
US Mainstream Rock Tracks (Billboard)	29
US Modern Rock Tracks (Billboard)	82

2006 year-end chart performance for "Wasteland"
Chart (2006)	Position
US Alternative Songs (Billboard)	7
US Mainstream Rock Songs (Billboard)	5

== Certifications ==
Certifications for "Wasteland"
Region	Certification	Certified units/sales
United States (RIAA)	2× Platinum	2,000,000^{‡}
^{‡} Sales+streaming figures based on certification alone.

== Release history ==
Release dates and formats for "Wasteland"
Region	Date	Format	Label(s)	Ref.
United States	January 31, 2006	Mainstream airplay	Universal	
