= From Birth to Burial =

Studio album by 10 Years
- Released: April 21, 2015
- Recorded: 2014–2015
- Studio: Kashmir Recording (Knoxville, Tennessee)
- Genre: Alternative metal
- Length: 40:08
- Label: Palehorse
- Producers: 10 Years, B. Vodinh

10 Years studio album chronology
Minus the Machine (2012)	From Birth to Burial (2015)	(How to Live) As Ghosts (2017)

Singles from From Birth to Burial
- 1. "Miscellanea" Released: January 25, 2015; 2. "From Birth to Burial" Released: August 6, 2015; 3. "Selling Skeletons" Released: February 11, 2016; 4. "Moisture Residue" Released: April 4, 2016

From Birth to Burial is the seventh studio album by American alternative metal band 10 Years. The album was released on April 21, 2015, through their own independent label called Palehorse Records, which is a part of Warner Music Group's Independent Label Group.

Professional ratings
Review scores
Source	Rating
CrypticRock	5/5 stars

== Track listing ==
All lyrics are written by Jesse Hasek; all music is composed by 10 Years.

From Birth to Burial
No.	Title	Length
1.	"From Birth to Burial"	4:11
2.	"Selling Skeletons"	3:14
3.	"Vertigo"	3:38
4.	"Triggers and Tripwires"	3:20
5.	"Luna"	3:23
6.	"Crimson Kiss"	3:14
7.	"The River"	4:09
8.	"Ashes"	3:19
9.	"Survivors?"	4:04
10.	"Miscellanea"	3:26
11.	"Moisture Residue"	4:10
Total length:		40:08

== Personnel ==
- Jesse Hasek – lead vocals
- Brian Vodinh – production, mixing, mastering, guitar, drums, programming, keys, backing vocals
- Ryan Collier – bass
- Ryan "Tater" Johnson – guitar
