= Division (10 Years album) =

Studio album by 10 Years
- Released: May 13, 2008
- Studios: London Bridge (Seattle); Pulse Recording (Los Angeles)
- Genre: Alternative metal
- Length: 53:28
- Label: Republic
- Producers: Rick Parashar; Brian Vodinh; Travis Wyrick; Brian Howes

10 Years chronology
The Autumn Effect (2005)	Division (2008)	Feeding the Wolves (2010)

Singles from Division
- 1. "Beautiful" Released: January 29, 2008; 2. "So Long, Good-Bye" Released: December 16, 2008; 3. "Actions & Motives" Released: May 25, 2009

Professional ratings
Review scores
Source	Rating
AllMusic	2.5/5 stars
Billboard	(favorable)
TuneLab Music	10/10 stars
Revolver	4/5 stars
Ultimate Guitar	(8.9/10)

Division is the fourth studio album by the American alternative metal band 10 Years, released on May 13, 2008, through Republic Records.

== Track listing ==
No.	Title	Length
1.	"Actions & Motives"	3:23
2.	"Just Can't Win"	3:35
3.	"Beautiful"	3:17
4.	"11:00 AM (Daydreamer)" ("11:00 AM (Daydreamer)" ends at 3:09 but is succeeded by the hidden track: "Planets I" (3:09-5:09))	5:09
5.	"Dying Youth"	3:50
6.	"Russian Roulette"	3:49
7.	"Focus"	3:13
8.	"Drug of Choice"	3:38
9.	"Picture Perfect (In Your Eyes)" ("Picture Perfect (In Your Eyes)" ends at 3:32 but is succeeded by the hidden track: "Planets II" (3:32–6:20))	6:20
10.	"All Your Lies"	3:46
11.	"So Long, Good-Bye"	3:43
12.	"Alabama"	3:54
13.	"Proud of You"	5:51
Total length:		53:30

Best Buy Exclusive Bonus Tracks
No.	Title	Length
14.	"Scream at the Walls"	4:06
15.	"Cycle of Life"	3:59
Total length:		1:01:35

iTunes Bonus Track
No.	Title	Length
14.	"Patiently"	3:34
Total length:		57:04

Notes

- Additionally, an acoustic version of "Beautiful" is available for download with purchases through retailer f.y.e.
- 10 Years added the second single, So Long, Good-Bye. A rock version was added to their Myspace page which was released on October 7, 2008 and was made available on iTunes on December 16, 2008.
- The third single, Actions & Motives, was released as a digital bundle with the song, an acoustic version of "Russian Roulette", and a music video for "Actions and Motives" on iTunes on May 26, 2009.

== Personnel ==
10 Years

- Jesse Hasek – vocals
- Ryan Johnson – guitar
- Matt Wantland – guitar
- Lewis Cosby – bass
- Brian Vodinh – drums

Guests

- Joe Carolus – piano on "Proud of You"
- Alaina Alexander – background vocals on "Proud of You" and spoken word on "Planets 2"
- Travis Wyrick – co-wrote "Beautiful" and "Picture Perfect (In Your Eyes)"
- Dean DeLeo – co-wrote "Focus"

== Charts ==
Chart (2008)	Peak position
US Billboard 200	12
