= Cleartone Strings =

Treated guitar strings company

Cleartone
- Type: Private
- Industry: Musical instruments
- Founded: 1990s in Los Angeles, California, US
- Founder: Phil Everly and Jason Everly
- Headquarters: Salt Lake City, Utah, US
- Key people: Scott Sciacca (VP); Michael Loscalzo (GM)
- Products: Electric, acoustic, classical and bass guitar strings; guitar picks
- Brands: Cleartone Strings; Star Picks
- Website: cleartonestrings.com

Cleartone Strings is an American guitar-string brand developed by Phil Everly of the Everly Brothers and his son Jason Everly. The brand originated from the Everlys' guitar-string business and was established to market a patented treatment they developed to extend string life while retaining the feel of conventional strings. Cleartone produces strings for electric, acoustic, classical and bass guitars, as well as guitar picks under the Star Picks brand. Its treatment technology was used by C.F. Martin for its SP Lifespan strings, while Gibson USA adopted Cleartone strings as factory-installed equipment.

== History ==
The string business was founded by Phil Everly of the Everly Brothers alongside his son Jason. They began making guitar strings from their home in the 1990s. By 2002, the business had moved into a factory in Burbank, California, where it was producing thousands of strings per day under the Everly Music name. Its products included Electric Rockers and Acoustic Sessions strings, as well as Star Picks guitar picks.

In 2022, following Cleartone's relocation of its manufacturing operation from Los Angeles to Salt Lake City, U.S. Manufacturing Report published a feature on the company and its manufacturing operations. The report covered Cleartone's history and origins with the Everly family, the development of its treated-string technology, its domestic manufacturing process, and the company's relocation to Utah. The feature also discussed the company's ownership and management, production methods, and continued manufacture of guitar strings in the United States.

In a 2020 factory report, Polish music publication TopGuitar profiled Cleartone's history, manufacturing and string technology. The publication traced Cleartone to the Everly Music Company, founded by Phil Everly in the 1990s, and reported that Jason Everly took over the business following his father's death. The report examined the company's manufacturing operation in North Hollywood, including its specialized string-winding machinery, use of domestically sourced materials and the challenges of maintaining production in California. It also discussed Cleartone's treated-string technology, manufacturing of unusual gauges and customized string sets, and use of high-tension winding intended to improve tuning stability.

Music historian Barry Mazor wrote that Phil Everly's experience with guitars and interest in tinkering in his workshop with his sons led him and Jason Everly to develop a guitar-string coating intended to make strings last longer and play louder. The patented treatment was marketed through Cleartone Strings, a company established for the technology and run by Jason Everly. Mazor also noted Phil Everly's interest in improving guitar strings through the use of more modern manufacturing machinery.

Phil Everly remained involved in the string business later in his life. In what Paste described as his final official interview, recorded shortly before his death in 2014, Everly said that he and his son continued to run a string company together.

Guitar string production at Cleartone Strings

== Guitar String Technology ==
Guitar string manufacturing at Cleartone Strings.

The Cleartone treatment was granted U.S. patents relating to its string technology. The first patent was filed in 2006 and granted in 2009, while a second patent was granted in 2016. The patents list Phillip Jason Everly as the inventor.

The treatment is applied to the string surface at less than one micron thick. Guitar Player described Cleartone's treatment and contrasted its feel with conventional coated-string designs.

Cleartone's string design also involved the relationship between the core and wrap wires. In a 2012 Premier Guitar article about guitar-string construction, Jason Everly explained that changing the amount of wrap wire relative to the core affects the tonal response of a wound string, with greater winding mass producing more audible low frequencies.

=== Use by major guitar manufacturers ===
In 2010, C.F. Martin used Cleartone treatment technology for its Martin SP Lifespan strings. Music & Arts reported that the treatment was intended to extend string life by protecting against dirt, oil and environmental contaminants while minimizing changes to the strings' tone and feel. Contemporary coverage also reported that the SP Lifespan strings were manufactured by Martin and treated using Cleartone's technology.

In 2013, Gibson USA adopted Cleartone Strings as factory-installed equipment. Guitar Interactive Magazine reported that Gibson made the switch following extensive testing in a retail environment, during which Cleartone-equipped guitars were found to retain a new-string sound longer than guitars fitted with uncoated strings. The strings were wound and treated at Cleartone's North Hollywood factory.

=== Artist use ===
Megadeth guitarist Dave Mustaine used Cleartone strings and collaborated with the company on a signature 10–52 string set. In an interview with MusicRadar, Mustaine cited the strings' longevity and sound as reasons for using them. Guitar World reported that Mustaine used Cleartone strings exclusively on his guitars, including during the recording of Megadeth's Super Collider and on the band's Gigantour performances, and cited their volume, brightness, durability and sound as reasons for his preference. A separate Reverb interview documented Cleartone strings as part of Mustaine's touring guitar setup.

Chevelle guitarist and vocalist Pete Loeffler has also used Cleartone strings and has a signature 12–65 gauge string set. Chevelle lists Cleartone Strings among the band's official sponsors. In a video published through Chevelle's official Instagram account, Loeffler discussed his use of Cleartone strings.

=== Reception ===
In an article about coated bass strings published by Bass Gear Magazine, instrument maker Roger Sadowsky compared the electrical conductivity of several coated-string brands using an analog ohm meter. He reported that Cleartone and D'Addario were the only brands he tested whose coatings remained conductive, while the coatings on strings from DR, Elixir, Ernie Ball, GHS and Rotosound tested as non-conductive. Sadowsky described the coatings used by Cleartone and D'Addario as thin and difficult to detect and recommended the two brands based on his testing.

In a review published by Spanish guitar magazine Cutaway Guitar Magazine, Will Martin discussed Cleartone within the broader development of treated guitar strings, noting the industry's efforts to combine durability with the retention of a new string's brightness. He contrasted Cleartone's treatment with earlier approaches that could reduce brightness or deteriorate with use, and highlighted the extremely thin application of Cleartone's treatment as a distinguishing feature. Martin tested a 10–46 nickel-plated set on a Telecaster and reported that the strings retained much of the brightness associated with conventional nickel strings while providing a smooth feel without a noticeable coated sensation. He described Cleartone's approach as "possibly the most significant advancement" in this area in recent years. While reserving judgment on long-term durability until the strings had received further use, Martin said their sound had already proved effective and expressed high expectations for their longevity.

Guitar Player noted that although Cleartone's treated strings cost more than conventional untreated sets, they were priced below treated strings from Elixir, Stringjoy and DR, and suggested that their extended lifespan could offset the higher initial cost. The review also described Cleartone's treatment as providing a smoother, more natural feel than some competing coated strings, which the reviewer characterized as having a "squeaky" or plastic-like feel.

Guitar World tested Cleartone treated electric strings over a two-week period and identified the consistency of their tone as the primary benefit, reporting little degradation from the sound produced when first installed. The reviewer also found no discernible difference in feel compared with untreated strings and noted that this could appeal to players who dislike the texture of conventional coated strings. The review concluded that maintaining consistent tone while retaining the feel of a conventional string was the set's principal advantage.
