= Into the Half Moon =

Studio album by 10 Years
- Released: August 13, 2001
- Studio: Lakeside (Knoxville, Tennessee)
- Genre: Alternative metal
- Length: 39:20
- Label: Self-released
- Producer: Travis Wyrick; 10 Years

10 Years chronology
Into the Half Moon (2001)	Killing All That Holds You (2004)

Into the Half Moon is the debut studio album by American alternative metal band 10 Years, independently released on August 13, 2001. The album was highly promoted on the band's original website, with "What the Fuck" being available for download a few months before the official release. The song "When Will You Breathe?" debuted on a local radio station along with "Fallaway".

== Background ==
This is the only 10 Years release to feature original vocalist Michael Underdown, who left the band in 2002. Guitarist Matt Wantland stated "We did start the band in 1999. The original people who in the band were me, Tater [Ryan Johnson] the guitar player, Brian [Vodinh] the drummer, a different singer for a few years, Mike [Underdown], and Lewis [Cosby], who plays bass. It was probably 2002 when Jesse joined the band, so I guess some people look at that like the full creation of 10 Years but we’ve been doing it for a little over a decade now." The album is not listed on the band's official website. The album name comes from a poem on the inside of the booklet.

== Track listing ==
All tracks are written by 10 Years.

No.	Title	Length
1.	"Fallaway"	3:31
2.	"Vicious (Parasite)"	4:09
3.	"Angelic"	4:37
4.	"What the Fuck"	4:32
5.	"When Will You Breathe?"	4:47
6.	"Try Again"	3:22
7.	"Nightingale"	6:05
8.	"Riptide"	3:32
9.	"Dragonfaith"	4:45
Total length:		39:20

== Personnel ==
10 Years

- Michael Underdown (credited as Michael Lee) – vocals
- Ryan "Tater" Johnson – guitar
- Matt Wantland – guitar
- Andy Parks – bass
- Brian Vodinh – drums, vocals on track 5

Production

- Travis Wyrick – production, recording, mixing
- 10 Years – production
- Donald Lyles – additional engineering
- Scotty Hoaglan – additional engineering
- Seva David-Louis Ball – mastering
- Travis Stevens – art direction, photography
