= Feeding the Wolves (10 Years album) =

Studio album by 10 Years
- Released: August 31, 2010
- Recorded: 2010
- Studio: Bay 7 (Valley Village, California); Sparky Dark (Los Angeles)
- Genre: Alternative metal; post-grunge
- Length: 37:50
- Label: Universal Republic
- Producer: Howard Benson

10 Years chronology
Division (2008)	Feeding the Wolves (2010)	Minus the Machine (2012)

Singles from Feeding the Wolves
- 1. "Shoot It Out" Released: July 7, 2010; 2. "Fix Me" Released: February 1, 2011; 3. "Now Is The Time (Ravenous)" Released: September 27, 2011

Professional ratings
Review scores
Source	Rating
AllMusic	2.5/5 stars
Sputnikmusic	3.5/5 stars

Feeding the Wolves is the fifth studio album by the American rock band 10 Years, and their third major label release. It debuted at No. 17 on the Billboard 200 chart, with 19,000 units sold.

== Background ==
The album was produced by Grammy-nominated producer Howard Benson and mixed by Chris Lord-Alge. The band has mentioned this will be their heaviest material to date and "very similar to some of their early songs." The 10-track album was the Tennessee band's first since founding guitarist Matt Wantland left the group in 2009.

Throughout the first half of 2010, the band went back and forth between putting on live shows and working on the album in the studio. During this time, they debuted a few new songs live, including "Dead in the Water", "Now is the Time", and the new album's first single "Shoot It Out".

The bonus track "Silhouette of a Life" was also included on their 2004 album Killing All That Holds You.

In June 2011 a video was shot for "Fix Me" and released in later 2011.

== Track listing ==
All music is composed by Lewis Cosby, Jesse Hasek, Ryan "Tater" Johnson, Brian Vodinh.

No.	Title	Lyrics	Length
1.	"Shoot It Out"	Hasek	3:19
2.	"The Wicked Ones"	Hasek	3:30
3.	"Now Is the Time (Ravenous)"	Hasek	3:51
4.	"One More Day"	Dave Bassett, Hasek	4:11
5.	"Fix Me"	Bassett, Hasek	3:35
6.	"Chasing the Rapture"	Hasek	3:26
7.	"Dead in the Water"	Hasek	3:30
8.	"Don't Fight It"	Bassett, Hasek	3:41
9.	"Waking Up the Ghost"	Johnny Andrews, Hasek	2:57
10.	"Fade Into (the Ocean)"	Hasek	5:44
11.	"I Blame You" (iTunes bonus track)	Hasek	3:05

=== Deluxe edition ===
On the deluxe edition of the album, "Fade Into (the Ocean)" appears as track 11, and the bonus track "Running in Place" take the place of track 10. On both editions of the album, the iTunes bonus track appears at the end of the album.

No.	Title	Lyrics	Length
10.	"Running in Place"	Hasek	3:32
11.	"Fade Into (the Ocean)"	Hasek	5:44
12.	"Shoot It Out" (Acoustic)	Hasek	3:19
13.	"Fix Me" (Acoustic)	Bassett, Hasek	3:31
14.	"Silhouette of a Life" (originally from Killing All That Holds You)	Hasek	4:46
15.	"I Blame You" (iTunes bonus track)	Hasek	3:05

== Personnel ==
=== Band ===
- Jesse Hasek – vocals
- Ryan "Tater" Johnson – guitar, backing vocals
- Lewis "Big Lew" Cosby – bass
- Brian Vodinh – drums, guitar

=== Production ===
- Howard Benson – producer
- Chris Lord-Alge – mixing
