= 10 Years (band) =

American alternative metal band

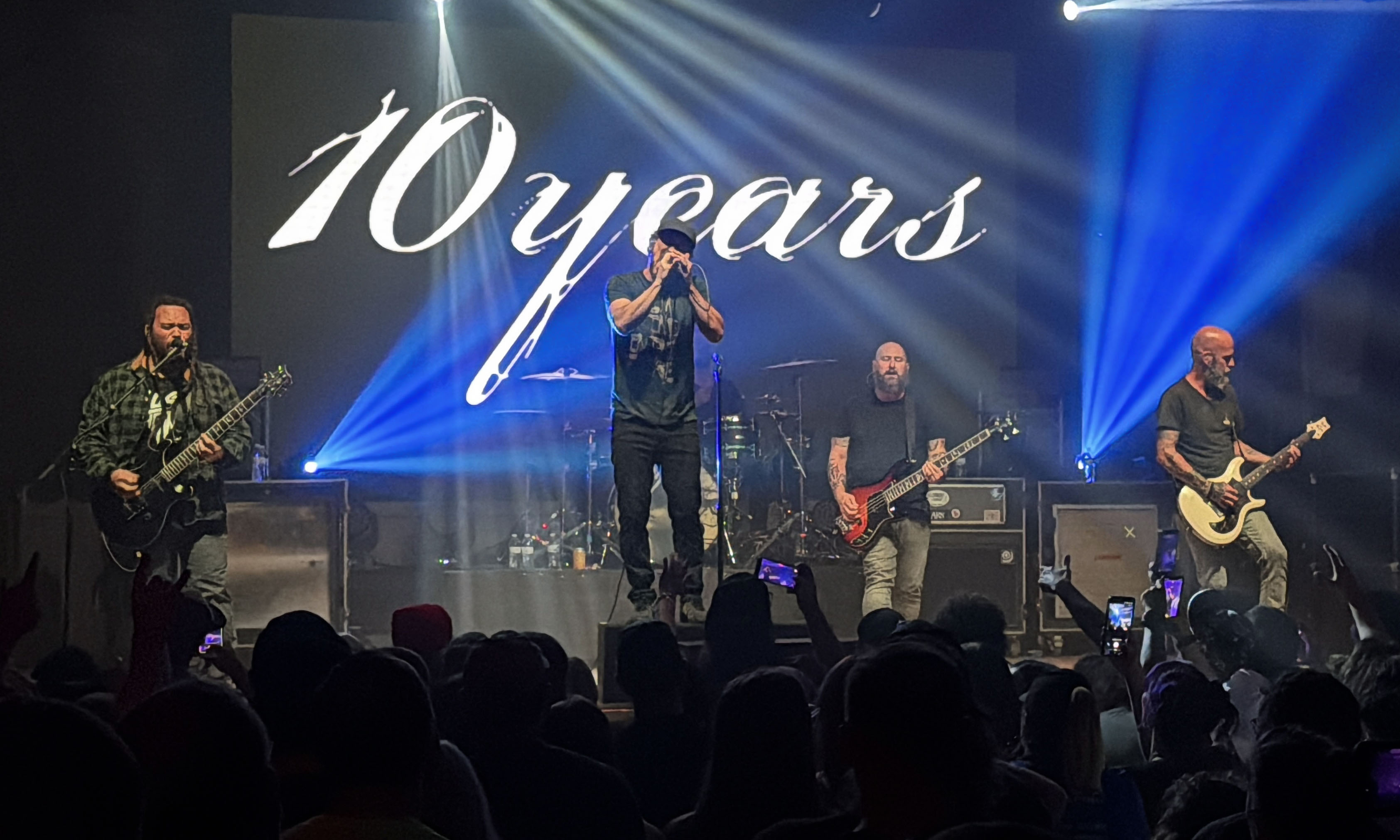
- 10 Years performing in 2026 at The Foundry in Waynesboro, Virginia

Background information
- Origin: Knoxville, Tennessee, U.S.
- Genres: Alternative metal; progressive metal; nu metal; post-grunge
- Years active: 1999–present
- Labels: Universal; Republic; Palehorse/ILG (Warner); Mascot
- Members: Jesse Hasek; Brian Vodinh; Luke Narey; Matt Wantland; Chad Grennor
- Past members: Mike Underdown; Andy Parks; Lewis "Big Lew" Cosby; Ryan Collier; Ryan "Tater" Johnson; Chad Huff; Kyle Mayer
- Website: 10yearsmusic.com

10 Years is an American alternative metal band formed in Knoxville, Tennessee, in 1999. The band consists of lead vocalist Jesse Hasek, lead guitarist Brian Vodinh, rhythm guitarist Matt Wantland, and bassist Chad Grennor. The group has gone through multiple line-up changes since their inception, with Vodinh and Wantland being the only remaining founding members. To date, they have released 10 studio albums, their most recent being Deconstructed in 2022. In 2024, they released an EP titled Inner Darkness and the full album has been announced to release in 2026.

== History ==
=== Early years, Into the Half Moon (1999–2001) ===
10 Years were initially formed in Knoxville, Tennessee in 1999 with singer Mike Underdown, drummer Brian Vodinh, bassist Lewis Cosby, and guitarists Ryan Johnson and Matt Wantland. In 2001, Cosby left and the band recruited Andy Parks on bass. They independently recorded Into the Half Moon the same year.

=== Killing All That Holds You, The Autumn Effect (2002–2006) ===
Lead vocalist Mike Underdown left the band to pursue a career in acting and start up a new band, Courage, You Bastards, in Los Angeles, California. 10 Years soon recruited current vocalist Jesse Hasek from another local band named deficit. In 2002, Parks decided to leave the band and Cosby returned. The band then released their independent album Killing All That Holds You in 2004.

10 Years were then signed to Universal Records in 2005 and released their major label debut, The Autumn Effect on August 16, 2005, with the songs "Wasteland" and "Through the Iris" picking up regional radio play. Their first single, "Wasteland", spent over 12 months on the rock charts, finally reaching No. 1 at active rock radio in December 2005.

That same summer, the band toured with Disturbed and Ill Niño. In the fall of 2005, they toured with Breaking Benjamin and Smile Empty Soul, then followed up with the Masters of Horror tour with Mudvayne and Sevendust. They opened for Korn and Mudvayne on Korn's See You on the Other Side tour. They also toured with Korn and Deftones on the Family Values Tour, which started in late July 2006.

In mid-February 2006, "Wasteland" reached No. 1 on the Billboard Alternative Songs chart.

In mid-2006, the band toured Australia in a lineup which included Hatebreed, Disturbed and Korn.

Their first music video, "Wasteland", addresses the social problem of human rights as well as addiction around the world. The video received a nomination for Best Direction and Best Art Direction at the 2006 MTV Video Music Awards, but did not win either.

On March 27, 2006, an EP was released on iTunes containing acoustic versions of "Wasteland", "Prey", "Through the Iris" and "Faultline" from The Autumn Effect.

As of December 2017, The Autumn Effect and its breakthrough single, "Wasteland", have been certified Gold by the RIAA.

=== Division (2006–2008) ===
On November 19, 2006, 10 Years unveiled and confirmed the title Division for their second album. The band began recording Division in late June 2007 after spending the better part of a year writing.

Lewis told in an interview that the album is "so different from the first one [The Autumn Effect], but it's still 10 Years", and, "It just sounds like [the songs] would be from a totally different band, which was, you know, the goal". It was also revealed that the track titled "Focus" was co-written with Stone Temple Pilots and former Army of Anyone guitarist Dean DeLeo.

On May 21, 2007, a demo song titled "All Your Lies" from Division was released onto their MySpace along with a post stating the band had chosen producer Rick Parasher to produce the new album. On September 7, the band announced on their MySpace that the album was finished and would be released in 2008, following a tour with Dir En Grey, Sevendust, Operator, Thousand Foot Krutch and Chevelle.

A year later on January 29, 2008, "Beautiful", the new single from Division, was released to iTunes and a snippet was also posted on the band's MySpace page. Division was released on May 13, 2008, after being pushed back due to finalization of the album's artwork.

10 Years was featured on the Revolution Stage of Linkin Park's Summer Projekt Revolution 2008 tour with Atreyu, Hawthorne Heights and Armor For Sleep. They went on tour with Mudvayne until mid December 2008.

In December 2009, Matt Wantland announced he was leaving the band to pursue other interests.

The album was dedicated to actor Brad Renfro, who died in 2008 at the age of 25. Renfro was Jesse Hasek's cousin.

=== Feeding the Wolves (2009–2011) ===
10 Years announced that their upcoming and third major label album would be titled Feeding the Wolves. The album was produced by Grammy-nominated producer Howard Benson and mixed by Chris Lord-Alge. The band has mentioned the album is of their heaviest material to date and "very similar to some of their early songs".

Throughout the first half of 2010, the band went back and forth between putting on live shows and working in the studio. Before the album was released, the band debuted new songs at live performances such as "Dead in the Water", "Now is the Time", and the new album's first single "Shoot It Out".

On June 12, 2010, "Shoot It Out" was featured on Sirius/XM Radio. The track was released to radio later that month, and was made available for download on iTunes July 6. Feeding the Wolves was released on August 31, 2010.

To promote the album's release, the band opened Shinedown's 2010 Carnival of Madness summer tour alongside Chevelle, Puddle of Mudd, and Sevendust. In the fall, they joined Sevendust again on the Hard Drive Live tour with support from Since October and Anew Revolution.

In December, the band went on a mini-headline tour, where they played some older songs that they had not played in some time. February 2011, their new single "Fix Me" releases to radio while they headline a spring tour with Hollywood Undead.

On June 17 and 18, the band shot a music video for "Fix Me" in Columbus, Ohio with production company Thunder Down Country. The video was released via YouTube on August 9, 2011.

=== Minus the Machine (2011–2014) ===
On April 2, 2012, the band announced that their upcoming record, Minus the Machine, was to be released on July 30 on their own independent label, Palehorse Records; a label which the band stated is a part of Warner Music Group's Independent Label Group. They also announced a four-week headlining tour to support the record, which was to begin on June 27 in New Orleans.

On May 11, the band unveiled the cover art of the album and it was announced that the album's release has been pushed back to August 7. 10 Years released their first single "Backlash" on radio and iTunes on June 19. On July 2, 2012, 10 years releases a compilation video on their website featuring another song "Knives" from their upcoming album Minus the Machine. "Backlash" music video made its premiere on July 27, 2012. Their next single was "Dancing with the Dead".

10 Years recruited Fair to Midland bassist Ryan Collier to join them on their upcoming North American headline tour On September 19, 2012. Collier replaced Lewis Cosby, who took time off to prepare for the birth of his first child.

On December 29, 2012, at a home show in Knoxville, 10 Years performed a special version of "Shoot It Out" featuring the original lead singer, Mike Underdown, along with current vocalist Jesse Hasek.

10 Years toured Australia in late February as part of Soundwave 2014, after not playing in the country for seven years.

=== From Birth to Burial and (2014–2017) ===
From Birth to Burial is 10 Years's seventh studio album, released on April 21, 2015. Their first single Miscellanea was released on February 13, 2015. The band have been on tour supporting the album touring with Breaking Benjamin for the American leg of the tour and Dead Letter Circus for the Australian leg.

At the end of 2016, the group signed to Mascot Label Group.

=== (How to Live) as Ghosts (2017–2018) ===
The band's eighth studio album titled (How to Live) as Ghosts, and recorded with producer, Nick Raskulinecz, was released on October 27, 2017. The first single, "Novacaine", was released prior in August, while the second single, "Burnout" followed in April. The former single became the group's first Top 5 hit on the Mainstream Rock chart since "Wasteland" in 2005.

Chad Grennor joined 10 Years as a touring bassist in 2018, playing his first show with the band in January. Luke Narey joined the band for their European tour for the fall of 2018 following drummer Kyle Mayer's departure from the band.

=== Violent Allies (2019–present) ===
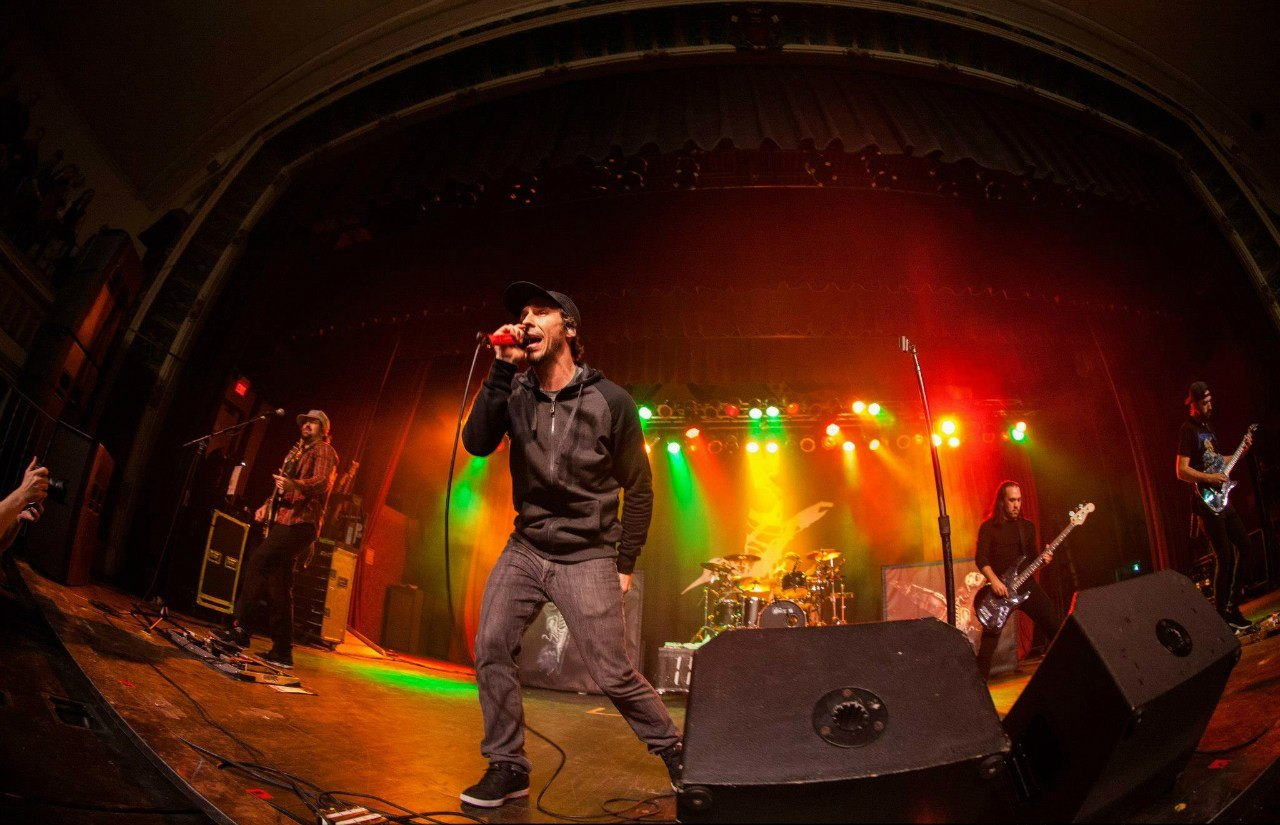
10 Years performing

In May 2020, the band released a new single, "The Shift". On July 10, they released another song, "The Unknown", and announced their newest album, Violent Allies, which was released on September 18.

On February 10, 2022, the band announced a new digital-only album: Deconstructed. The album includes 19 alternate takes on the band's biggest hits, including the lead singles "Wasteland" and "The Unknown". It was released on March 4, 2022.

On September 9, 2025, the band released a cover of Florence + The Machine's song, “No Light, No Light”.

== Musical style ==
The band's genre has mainly been termed by journalists as alternative metal; however, they have also been categorized under progressive metal, post-grunge, and nu metal. AllMusic characterized their sound as "offering a Southern take on the moody atmosphere, seismic heft, and brash dynamics of modern rock."

== Band members ==
=== Current official members ===
- Jesse Hasek – lead vocals (2002–present)
- Matt Wantland – rhythm guitar (1999–2009, 2016–present)
- Brian Vodinh – lead guitar (2016–present), drums (1999–2012, 2012–present only studio and occasionally live until 2016), bass (2012–present studio and occasionally live until 2016), rhythm guitar (2009–2012, 2012–2016 studio and occasionally live), backing vocals (1999–present, only studio from 2012 until 2016), keyboards (2011–present studio)

==== Current session members ====
- Chad Grennor – bass (2018–present)
- Brian Medeiros – drums (2025–present)

=== Former members ===
- Mike Underdown – lead vocals (1999–2001)
- Ryan Johnson – lead guitar, backing vocals (1999–2016)
- Lewis Cosby – bass (1999–2001, 2002–2012)
- Andy Parks – bass (2001–2002)

==== Former session members ====
- Matt Brown – drums (2010)
- Kyle Mayer – drums, occasional keyboards (2012–2018)
- Chad Huff – rhythm guitar (2012–2016), bass (occasionally: 2012–2016, full-time: 2016–2018)
- Ryan Collier – bass (2012–2016)
- Luke Narey – drums (2018–2024)

=== Timelines ===
Studio

Live

== Discography ==
Studio albums

- Into the Half Moon (2001)
- Killing All That Holds You (2004)
- The Autumn Effect (2005)
- Division (2008)
- Feeding the Wolves (2010)
- Minus the Machine (2012)
- From Birth to Burial (2015)
- (How to Live) as Ghosts (2017)
- Violent Allies (2020)
