= Smile Empty Soul discography =

This is the discography for American alternative rock band Smile Empty Soul.

== Studio albums ==
Title	Album details	Peak chart positions		Certifications
Title	Album details	US	US Ind.	Certifications
Smile Empty Soul	Released: May 27, 2003; Label: Lava; Formats: CD, DI	94	—	RIAA: Gold
Anxiety	Released: September 27, 2005; Label: Lava, MRAfia, F.O.F. Label Group; Formats: CD, DI	—	—	
Vultures	Released: October 24, 2006; Label: Bieler Bros.; Formats: CD, DI, Vinyl	169	14	
Consciousness	Released: August 25, 2009; Label: F.O.F. Label Group, EMI; Formats: CD, DI	156	—	
3's	Released: May 22, 2012; Label: eOne; Formats: CD, DI	—	—	
Chemicals	Released: October 1, 2013; Label: Pavement Entertainment, Two Disciples Entertainment; Formats: CD, DI	—	—	
Oblivion	Released: May 25, 2018; Label: Smile Empty Music; Formats: CD, DI, Vinyl	—	—	
Black Pilled	Released: October 12, 2021; Label: Smile Empty Music; Format: CD, DI	—	—	

== Compilation albums ==
Title	Album details
Rarities	Released: March 10, 2017; Label: MRAfia; Formats: CD, DI
The Acoustic Sessions, volumes 1 and 2	Released: July, 2020; Label: Smile Empty Music; Formats: CD
Four Horsemen of the Apocalypse	Released: January, 2023; Label: Smile Empty Music; Formats: CD; Limited Release: 300 copies

== EPs ==
Title	EP details
B-Sides	Released: 2007; Label: MRAfia; Formats: CD, DI
Shapeshifter	Released: April 1, 2016; Label: Pavement Entertainment; Formats: CD/DVD, DI, Cassette
Acoustic Sessions Vol.1	Released: February 22, 2019; Label: Smile Empty Music; Formats: CD, DI
Sheep	Released: December 6, 2019; Label: Smile Empty Music; Formats: CD, DI, Vinyl
Acoustic Sessions Vol.2	Released: June 30, 2020; Label: Smile Empty Music; Formats: CD, DI
2020	Released: September 4, 2020; Label: Smile Empty Music; Formats: CD, DI
Soft Songs for the Quarantined Mind	Released: January 12, 2021; Label: Smile Empty Music
The Loss of Everything	Released: October 4, 2022; Label: Smile Empty Music
Swan Song	Released: February 28, 2025; Label: Smile Empty Music; Formats: CD, DI

== Singles ==
Title	Year	Peak chart positions			Album
Title	Year	US	US Alt.	US Main.	Album
"Bottom of a Bottle"^{[A]}	2003	107	7	8	Smile Empty Soul
"Nowhere Kids"	2004	—	27	26	Smile Empty Soul
"Silhouettes"	2004	—	22	25	Smile Empty Soul
"Don't Need You"	2005	—	—	37	Anxiety
"The Hit"	2006	—	—	—	Vultures
"Here's to Another"	2007	—	—	—	Vultures
"Loser"	2007	—	—	—	Vultures
"Don't Ever Leave"	2009	—	—	39	Consciousness
"Alone with Nothing"	2010	—	—	—	Consciousness
"We're Through"	2010	—	—	—	Consciousness
"Afterlife"	2012	—	—	—	3's
"False Alarm"	2013	—	—	27	Chemicals
"Chemicals"	2014	—	—	—	Chemicals
"All in My Head"	2016	—	—	—	Shapeshifter
"Sides"	2018	—	—	—	Oblivion
"Stars"	2018	—	—	—	Oblivion
"—" denotes a release that did not chart.

== Other songs ==
- "Alone"

== Music videos ==
- "Bottom of a Bottle"
- "Nowhere Kids"
- "Silhouettes"
- "This Is War"
- "Here's to Another"
- "Jesus Is the Manager at Wal-Mart"
- "Loser"
- "Don't Ever Leave"
- "We're Through"
- "Faker"
- "Afterlife"
- "Not Alike"
- "Wrecking Ball"
- "False Alarm"
- "Chemicals"
- "All In My Head"
- "Not Alike"
- "Stars"
- "My Name"
- "Savior"

== Contributions ==
- "Finding Myself" – Featured on The Punisher: The Album (2004)
- "Who I Am" – Featured on Music from and Inspired by Spider-Man 2 (2004)
