= The Darker Side of Nonsense =

Studio album by Dry Kill Logic
- Released: June 5, 2001
- Studio: Red Clay Studios, Suffern, New York; BearTracks Studios, Suffern, New York
- Genre: Nu metal
- Length: 44:04
- Label: Roadrunner
- Producer: Eddie Wohl

Dry Kill Logic chronology
| Elemental Evil EP (1999) | The Darker Side of Nonsense (2001) | The Dead and Dreaming (2004) |

Singles from The Darker Side of Nonsense
- 1. "Rot" Released: 2002 (EP); 2. "Nightmare" Released: 2002

Professional ratings
Review scores
| Source | Rating |
|---|---|
| AllMusic | 3/5 stars |
| Kerrang! | 3/5 stars |

The Darker Side of Nonsense is the debut studio album by American heavy metal band Dry Kill Logic. It was released on June 5, 2001, by Roadrunner Records and was the band's only release on that label. The album spent two weeks on the Billboard Independent Albums chart, peaking at number 27.

== Track listing ==
All lyrics are written by Cliff Rigano, except where noted.

| No. | Title | Lyrics | Music | Length |
|---|---|---|---|---|
| 1. | "Nightmare" | | Scott Thompson, Phil Arcuri | 3:06 |
| 2. | "Feel the Break" | | Thompson | 3:07 |
| 3. | "Pain" | | Thompson, Dave Kowatch, Arcuri | 2:59 |
| 4. | "Nothing" | | Thompson, Arcuri | 3:29 |
| 5. | "Assfault" | | Thompson, Arcuri | 3:20 |
| 6. | "Weight" | | Thompson, Kowatch | 4:06 |
| 7. | "A Better Man Than Me" | | Thompson, Arcuri, Rigano | 2:55 |
| 8. | "Rot" | | Arcuri, Thompson, Rigano | 4:32 |
| 9. | "Track 13" | | Rigano, Arcuri | 2:42 |
| 10. | "Give Up, Give in, Lie Down" | | Arcuri, Kowatch | 3:30 |
| 11. | "The Strength I Call My Own" | | Thompson, Arcuri, Rigano | 3:02 |
| 12. | "Goodnight" ( (Note: After about the minute of silence, the hidden track "SAB" plays.)) | Igor Bokorcevic | | 7:16 |

== Personnel ==
Dry Kill Logic

- Cliff Rigano - vocals
- Scott Thompson - guitars
- Dave Kowatch - bass guitar
- Phil Arcuri - drums, additional guitars

Guest Appearances

- Bobby Burns - guitar (track 10)
- Jason "J-Sin" Luttrell - vocals (track 10)
- Matt Myhal - harmony vocals (track 9, 10 & 12)
- Rob Caggiano - guitar, harmony vocals, percussion
- Eddie Wohl - keyboards (track 12)
- Dana Mancuso - keyboards (track 12)

Production

- Rob Caggiano – mixing, engineer, noise, producer
- George Marino – mastering
- Eddie Wohl – producer, mixing, engineer
- Steve Regina – producer, mixing, engineer
- Daniel Moss – photography
- The Collective - design
- Alexander Kneselac - illustration
- Dry Kill Logic – main performer
- J.P. Sheganoski – engineer
