= Paper tiger (disambiguation) =

"Paper tiger" is a phrase referring to a superficially threatening but weak thing.

Paper Tiger(s) may refer to:

== Films ==
- Paper Tiger (1975 film), an adventure film starring David Niven
- Paper Tiger (2019 film), a comedy special by Bill Burr
- Paper Tiger (2020 film), a drama thriller by Paul Kowalski
- The Paper Tigers, a 2020 martial arts comedy by Bao Tran
- Paper Tiger (2026 film), a crime thriller by James Gray

== Media organizations ==
- Paper Tiger Books, a London-based imprint for art and sci-fi works (1976–2009)
- Paper Tiger Television, a New-York–based broadcasting non-profit (formed 1981)

== Music ==
=== Albums ===
- Paper Tigers, 2005, by the Caesars
- Paper Tiger, 1965, by Sue Thompson
- Paper Tigers, 2006, by Luomo

=== Artists ===
- Paper Tiger (hip hop producer), fl. 2010s

=== Songs ===
- "Paper Tiger", 1965, by Sue Thompson, 1965
- "Paper Tiger", 1988, by All from Allroy Sez
- "Paper Tiger", 1998, by Jaci Velasquez from Jaci Velasquez
- "Paper Tiger", 2002, by Spoon from Kill the Moonlight
- "Paper Tiger", 2002, by Beck from Sea Change
- "Paper Tiger", 2003, by Sick of It All from Life on the Ropes
- "Paper Tiger", 2004, by Dry Kill Logic from The Dead and Dreaming
- "Paper Tigers", 1983, by The Chameleons from Script of the Bridge
- "Paper Tigers", 1995, by Tom Cochrane from Ragged Ass Road
- "Paper Tigers", 2003, by Thrice from The Artist in the Ambulance
- "Paper Tigers", 2012, by Owl City
- "Paper Tiger", 2026, by Sahara Hotnights from No One Ever Really Changes

== Other uses ==
- Madiao, a Chinese card game
- Paper Tiger (yacht), a class of catamaran
- Paper Tiger, a novel by Tom Coyne
