= WFB =

WFB may refer to:

== Businesses and organisations ==
- Wells Fargo Bank, an American bank (formed 1929)
- WestfalenBahn, a German rail operator (formed 2005)
- World Fellowship of Buddhists (formed 1950)

== People ==
- Wilhelm Friedemann Bach (1710–1784), German composer
- William F. Buckley Jr. (1925–2008), American conservative commentator

== Publications ==
- Warhammer Fantasy Battle, a British tabletop wargame
- The Washington Free Beacon, an American online newspaper
- The World Factbook, by the United States' Central Intelligence Agency

== Other uses ==
- Whitefish Bay, Wisconsin, a village in the United States
- World Fire Brigade, an American hard rock band (formed 2009)
- Work From Bed, a remote work paradigm
