= Shapeshifter (Smile Empty Soul EP) =

EP by Smile Empty Soul
- Released: April 1, 2016
- Recorded: 2015
- Genre: Alternative rock, post-grunge
- Length: 21:57
- Label: Pavement Entertainment
- Producer: Eddie Wohl

Smile Empty Soul chronology
Chemicals (2013)	Shapeshifter (2016)	Rarities (2017)

Singles from Shapeshifter
- 1. "All In My Head" Released: March 4, 2016

Shapeshifter is a six-song EP by American alternative rock/post-grunge music group Smile Empty Soul. The EP contains three of the biggest singles from their 2003 self-titled debut album re-recorded — "Bottom of a Bottle", "Silhouettes" and "Nowhere Kids" — as well as three new songs. It also includes a DVD which consists of a music video for "All in My Head", a short documentary-style film from the making of Shapeshifter, and a behind-the-scenes video covering years of touring, studio sessions, music video shoots, and more.

"All in My Head" was released as the first single from the EP on March 4, 2016, with a music video premiere on Revolver Magazine's website on March 15, 2016.

== Track listing ==
No.	Title	Writer(s)	Length
1.	"All in My Head"	Sean Danielsen; Ryan Martin; Jake Kilmer	3:43
2.	"Running Out of Something"	Danielsen; Martin; Kilmer	3:01
3.	"Just One Place"	Danielsen; Martin; Kilmer	3:27
4.	"Silhouettes"	Danielsen; Martin; Derek Gledhill; John Lewis Parker	3:57
5.	"Nowhere Kids"	Danielsen; Martin; Gledhill; Parker	4:08
6.	"Bottom of a Bottle"	Danielsen; Martin; Gledhill; Parker	3:41

== Personnel ==
Smile Empty Soul

- Sean Danielsen – vocals, guitar
- Ryan Martin – bass
- Jake Kilmer – drums

Technical personnel

- Eddie Wohl – producer, engineer, mixing
- Derek Jones – drum engineer
- Maor Appelbaum – mastering
