= As seen on TV (disambiguation) =

As seen on TV is a marketing phrase used to represent products advertised on television.

As seen on TV may also refer to:

- As Seen on TV (game show), a 2009 British panel game show
- "As Seen on TV" (SpongeBob SquarePants), an episode in season 3 of SpongeBob SquarePants
- As Seen on TV, an EP by Primer 55, reissued as Introduction to Mayhem

== See also ==
- As Seen on Television, a 2004 EP by +/-
- Ass Seen on TV, a 1997 split album by Gob and Another Joe
- Victoria Wood: As Seen on TV, a 1985-1987 British comedy television series
