= Rarities (Smile Empty Soul album) =

Compilation album by Smile Empty Soul
- Released: March 10, 2017
- Genre: Alternative rock, post-grunge
- Label: MRAfia
- Producer: Eddie Wohl, Smile Empty Soul, Marcus, John Lewis Parker, Jake Kilmer, James Murray

Smile Empty Soul chronology
Shapeshifter (2016)	Rarities (2017)	Oblivion (2018)

Rarities is the first compilation album by American alternative rock/post-grunge music group Smile Empty Soul. The album has two different versions; 1 digital copy containing eight songs or one CD edition copy containing 13 songs. The album consists of five songs never before released, a handful of others that were only ever leaked out online, two soundtrack songs, a live acoustic version of an old song, and one re-record.

The album is scheduled to be released on 10 March 2017, in digital download and CD editions.

On 9 March 2017, thirteen songs from the CD edition were streamed via YouTube.

== Track listing ==
Digital download

No.	Title	Length
1.	"One at a Time"	5:55
2.	"Something New"	3:50
3.	"Alone"	3:47
4.	"Goodbye"	3:16
5.	"This Is War [Full Band]"	4:20
6.	"Wasted Town"	3:19
7.	"Whats Going Through My Head Right Now"	2:17
8.	"For You [Live-Acoustic]"	4:35

CD edition

No.	Title	Length
1.	"One at a Time"	5:55
2.	"Something New"	3:50
3.	"Alone"	3:47
4.	"Goodbye"	3:16
5.	"This Is War [Full Band]"	4:20
6.	"Wasted Town"	3:19
7.	"Whats Going Through My Head Right Now"	2:17
8.	"For You [Live-Acoustic]"	4:35
9.	"Who I am"	3:12
10.	"Finding Myself"	3:30
11.	"Precious Things (Tori Amos cover)"	3:29
12.	"Aneurysm (Nirvana cover)"	4:17
13.	"Possession (Sarah McLachlan cover)"	5:30

== Personnel ==
- Sean Danielsen – vocals, guitar
- Ryan Martin – bass
- Jake Kilmer – drums
