= Food Chain (EP) =

EP by Sean Danielsen
- Released: November 4, 2014
- Recorded: Babylon Studios, Van Nuys, California
- Genre: Alternative rock
- Length: 22:19
- Label: Independent
- Producer: Eddie Wohl

Sean Danielsen chronology
Enjoy the Process (2013)	Food Chain (2014)	Product of Isolation (2017)

Food Chain is the second solo extended play album from American recording artist Sean Danielsen, who is also the lead guitarist and lead vocalist of American hard rock ensemble Smile Empty Soul. Published on November 4, 2014, the album was produced by Eddie Wohl, and recorded at Babylon Studios in Van Nuys, California.

== Background ==
In contrast to Danielsen's previous solo album Enjoy the Process, which featured only the singer along with his acoustic guitar, Food Chain featured a full band. In October 2014, prior to the release of the EP, the singer released "Rescue Me", the second song from the album via Revolver Magazine. The singer stated that he selected the tune, because "it’s a very powerful song that a lot of people can relate to in this day and age", going on to say that "We live in an overly medicated society, and we all have people close to us being affected".

== Touring ==
In October and November 2014, the vocalist toured West Virginia along with the Midwestern and south central United States to promote the EP. Preceded by a free download of "Food Chain", the title track and heaviest song from the EP, Danielsen toured the south central and southeastern United States during January and February 2015. The guitarist also toured the Midwestern, East Coast and East South Central regions of the United States from May until June of 2015, with plans to visit portions of the western and central United States between the ends of July and August 2015.

== Critical reception ==
Sommer Sharon of Screamer Magazine the words to the songs as being "tight as usual", with the album being "cohesive", making for "enjoyable listening beginning to end". Sharon also goes on to say that the album excellently portrays Danielsen's "angst-influenced lyrics" and "signature voice".

Reggie Edwards of The Front Row Report states that the album "opens with a three song knockout" that "will calm you to the point that when the title track kicks in... ...it takes you completely by surprise before going back to the acoustic". Edwards goes on to say that "Broken Bones and Skeletons" is "one of the more emotional tracks Danielsen has written in awhile". He also points out that the record ventures "in a different direction from what he’s done" with his first major label band.

== Track listing ==
All tracks are written by Sean Danielsen.

No.	Title	Length
1.	"Waves"	5:31
2.	"Rescue Me"	4:40
3.	"Beautiful Things"	5:04
4.	"Food Chain"	2:52
5.	"Broken Bones and Skeletons"	4:12
Total length:		22:19
