= B-Sides (Smile Empty Soul EP) =

EP by Smile Empty Soul
- Released: 2007
- Genre: Alternative rock, post-grunge
- Length: 14:35
- Label: MRAfia Records

Smile Empty Soul chronology
Vultures (2006)	B-Sides (2007)	Consciousness (2009)

B-Sides is a 4-song EP by American alternative rock/post-grunge music group Smile Empty Soul. The EP contains a cover of the song "Possession" by Sarah McLachlan.

The song, "Who I Am", was featured on the Spider-Man 2 soundtrack. The song, "Finding Myself", was featured on The Punisher soundtrack.

The EP is long out of print and is nearly impossible to find. It was available for purchase directly from the band via MRAfia Webstore or at any show. When ordered from MRAfia webstore, it also came with a matching t-shirt.

== Track listing ==
No.	Title	Length
1.	"Possession"	5:30
2.	"Who I Am"	3:16
3.	"What's Going Through My Head Right Now"	2:18
4.	"Finding Myself"	3:31

== Personnel ==
- Sean Danielsen – vocals, guitar
- Ryan Martin – bass
- Jake Kilmer – drums on "Possession"
- Mike Booth – guitar on "Possession"
- Derek Gledhill – drums on "Who I Am" & "What's Going Through My Head Right Now"
