= Dry Kill Logic =

American metal band

- Also known as: Hinge (1995-2000); Hinge AD (2000)
- Origin: Westchester County, New York, U.S.
- Genres: Nu metal; metalcore; groove metal
- Years active: 1995–present
- Labels: Repossession Records, Roadrunner
- Members: Cliff Rigano; Jason Bozzi; Brendan Duff; Kevin Boutot
- Past members: Louie Bravo; Danny Horboychuk; Casey Mahoney; Scott Thompson; Adam Asborno
- Website: drykilllogic.com

Dry Kill Logic is an American heavy metal band from Westchester County, New York. Formed in 1995 under the names Hinge and Hinge AD, they have released three albums.

== History ==
=== Psychodrama Records (1997–1999) ===
After being together as a band for four years, they recorded and released (under their previous band name, Hinge) their first EP in 1997 titled Cause Moshing is Good Fun under Psychodrama Records – the band's own label.

The band's second EP Elemental Evil (1998) was once again released through their own label. The nine-track disc led them to open for many well-recognized acts including Coal Chamber, Incubus, Anthrax and System of a Down.

=== The Darker Side of Nonsense (2000–2003) ===
In 2000, Hinge signed a record deal with Roadrunner Records. After signing with the label, they were forced to change their name due to a recording studio owning the copyright to the same name. They briefly changed their name from Hinge to Hinge AD, but ultimately settled upon Dry Kill Logic after the studio threatened legal action if they used the word "Hinge" anywhere in their name; the name "Dry Kill Logic" was found in the manual of a mixing console, referring to the circuitry responsible for muting the "dry" (unprocessed) audio signal.

On June 5, 2001, their debut album The Darker Side of Nonsense was released. The album features a guest spot from Primer 55 members J-Sin (vocals) and Bobby Burns (guitar) on the track "Give Up, Give In, Lie Down". The band spent the better part of 2001 and 2002 on tour, performing around the world with such bands as Fear Factory, Kittie, Ill Niño, Spineshank, Saliva, Slayer and many others. The album went on to sell approximately 100,000 copies worldwide. However, due to Roadrunner wanting "a more commercial sound on the band's second effort", the band decided to part ways with the label in October 2002. Around the same time, the band split with guitarist Scott Thompson, replacing him with former Gargantua Soul guitarist Jason Bozzi, who remains with the group to this day.

As a bonus feature in the video game MLB Slugfest 2003, the band did a special recording and music video for the game. The original song is loosely based on the baseball classic Take Me Out to the Ball Game and is entitled "Riot at the Bat Rack".

=== The Dead and Dreaming (2004–2006) ===
On October 5, 2004, the band released their second major album The Dead and Dreaming, via Psychodrama Music Group with deals through two independent record labels – Repossession Records and German label SPV Records. This forward thinking arrangement was spearheaded by PMG and not only ensured a simultaneous worldwide release but also positioned the band to be the driving force behind every aspect of their career. Heading back in their van in 2004 the band toured for 15 months straight, beginning with Motörhead in Germany and working their way up to co-headlining tours with Hed PE and Drowning Pool, culminating with being hand picked by Dave Mustaine to become a crowd favorite on the 2005 Gigantour arena tour. The band also made waves overseas, and in 2006 headlined two tours of the UK and Europe as well as touring Australia with Fear Factory and Devildriver.

On June 27, 2006, the band produced, designed and directed their first DVD/EP, The Magellan Complex, which was a lead up for the band's upcoming album. The disc includes three songs and a bonus DVD consisting of the music video for "Paper Tiger", a live performance/interview piece from the Otep/American Head Charge tour (February 2005, New Orleans) as well as behind the scenes footage of the band on tour. This project was put together by the band for the fans, and includes artwork by guitarist Jason Bozzi, audio production by Phil Arcuri and video direction by Cliff Rigano. The band also demanded a low retail price in order to make the product more affordable for their fans worldwide, but also because the band thought the contents of the DVD didn't justify the price. This EP also marked the first recordings with new bassist Brendan Kane Duff.

=== Of Vengeance and Violence and hiatus (2006–2018) ===
On September 19, 2006, the band's third full-length album Of Vengeance and Violence was released worldwide via Psychodrama/Repossession Records. The band embarked on tours of Australia and Europe throughout 2006. The band has plans for performances in the United States, Canada and Japan, as well as return trips to Europe and Australia, through 2007. Repossession Records closed its doors in January 2007, and the band plans on releasing all their upcoming new material directly through Psychodrama Music Group.

For much of the late 2000s, the band went dormant, as the members have gone on to explore new ventures.

=== Return to music and untitled fourth studio album (2018–present) ===
On December 7, 2018, they announced via Facebook that "New music will be heard. Spread the word" Also posting photos of possible studio time.

In January 2019, the band began posting teaser clips on social media of new music. In July 2019, the band announced their signing to eOne Music with their new single "Vices" being released on September 6.

On September 9, 2020, it was announced that a new single entitled "Don't See Ghosts" would be released on September 18, 2020. The band released the song on their official YouTube page September 17, 2020.

The band performed live at Welcome to Rockville in 2025, 19 years after their last show. In an interview at the Aftershock festival, Rigano "committed to begin writing" a new album in 2026.

== Musical style and influences ==
Dry Kill Logic's music has been categorized as nu metal, metalcore, and groove metal. Members of the band have cited artists such as Sepultura, Alice Cooper, Slipknot, Machine Head, and Stevie Ray Vaughan as their influences. Phil Arcuri cited Vinnie Paul as an influence. Cliff Rigano has cited classical music and musicians such as Phil Anselmo, Alice Cooper, James Hetfield, and Neil Fallon as influences.

== Band members ==
=== Current members ===
- Cliff Rigano – vocals (1995–present)
- Jason Bozzi – guitars (2002–present)
- Brendan Duff – bass (2006–present)
- Kevin Boutot - drums (2025–present)

=== Former members ===
- Danny Horboychuk – bass
- Casey Mahoney – bass
- Dave Kowatch – bass
- Louie Bravo – guitar
- Scott Thompson – guitars
- Adam Asborno – drums
- Phil Arcuri – drums (–2017)

== Discography ==
=== Studio albums ===
- The Darker Side of Nonsense (2001)
- The Dead and Dreaming (2004)
- Of Vengeance and Violence (2006)

=== Extended plays ===
- Hinge (1996)
- 'Cause Moshing is Good Fun! (1997)
- Elemental Evil (1998)
- The Magellan Complex (2006)

=== Singles ===
- Nightmare (2001)
- Rot (2001)
- Vices (2019)
- Don't See Ghosts (2020)
- Hindsight (2022)
- Now You Belong With The Dead (2025)
