= Product of Isolation =

Studio album by Sean Danielsen
- Released: January 13, 2017
- Recorded: 2016
- Genre: Alternative rock
- Length: 39:05
- Producer: Sean Danielsen

Sean Danielsen chronology
Food Chain (2014)	Product of Isolation (2017)	Mind Control to Steal the Soul (2017)

Product of Isolation is the first solo studio album by American alternative rock musician Sean Danielsen. It was released independently on January 13, 2017.

== Background ==
During October 2016, Danielsen mentioned on his Facebook wall, that in January 2017, he planned to release his first solo studio album. In early November, the vocalist stated that 13 January 2017 would be the planned release date. This album was the first time that Danielsen used a home studio while engineering and producing completely on his own.

== Critical reception ==
Regarding the album, Robin Ervolina of Shockwave Magazine stated that Danielsen's "music has a truthful ring that seems to be absent in the current music scene, and there's a "heart and soul" to it, that makes me root for him in his pursuit to make music for real people".

Scott Langevin of Shockwave Magazine wrote that the album "stays true to his solo career's successes thus far", and went on to say: "With stunning lyrical subtleties, long and powerful breaths, and the long-held keys, this album is one of the key components that I feel any musician needs to be a success", showing "true talent, and just raw emotion throughout".

== Track listing ==
No.	Title	Length
1.	"Scattered Ashes"	3:41
2.	"Still"	3:55
3.	"The Light"	4:30
4.	"Back to Sleep"	4:49
5.	"Skin"	3:23
6.	"Tennessee"	3:59
7.	"All This Talk"	3:56
8.	"Parasite"	4:13
9.	"Is It Wrong"	3:16
10.	"Wedding Song"	3:23
Total length:		39:05
