= 3's =

3s

Studio album by Smile Empty Soul
- Released: May 22, 2012
- Recorded: 2011–2012
- Genre: Post-grunge, alternative metal, alternative rock
- Length: 44:22
- Label: eOne
- Producer: Eddie Wohl; Jay Baumgardner

Smile Empty Soul chronology
Consciousness (2009)	3s (2012)	Chemicals (2013)

Singles from 3's
- 1. "Afterlife" Released: April 16, 2012

Professional ratings
Review scores
Source	Rating
Allmusic	3/5 stars
Ultimate Guitar	(8.7)

3's (or 3s) is the fifth full-length album by American rock band Smile Empty Soul. It was released on May 22, 2012. "Afterlife" was chosen as the first single off the album along with an accompanying music video. Music videos were later released for the songs "Not Alike" & "Wrecking Ball".

== Track listing ==
All lyrics are written by Sean Danielsen; all music is composed by Sean Danielsen, Ryan Martin, and Jake Kilmer.

No.	Title	Length
1.	"Carve"	4:07
2.	"Ugly"	3:29
3.	"Warning"	3:43
4.	"Sleep Deprivation"	4:08
5.	"Hiding Place"	3:59
6.	"Let Go"	4:49
7.	"Basement"	3:26
8.	"Afterlife"	3:56
9.	"Greatest Hits and Medleys"	4:49
10.	"Hard Biter"	3:43
11.	"Wrecking Ball"	3:14
12.	"Not Alike"	3:03
Total length:		44:22

== Personnel ==
Smile Empty Soul

- Sean Danielsen – lead vocals, guitars
- Ryan Martin – bass
- Jake Kilmer – drums, backing vocals

Additional personnel

- Eddie Wohl – producer, engineer, mixing, programming, keyboards
- John Cranfield – engineer
- UE Nastasi – mastering
