= Oblivion (Smile Empty Soul album) =

Studio album by Smile Empty Soul
- Released: May 25, 2018
- Recorded: 2018
- Genre: Post-grunge, alternative metal, alternative rock
- Length: 35:04
- Label: Smile Empty Music Inc
- Producer: Sean Danielsen

Smile Empty Soul chronology
Rarities (2017)	Oblivion (2018)	Acoustic Sessions Vol.1 (2019)

Singles from Oblivion
- 1. "Sides" Released: April 6, 2018; 2. "Stars" Released: April 13, 2018

Oblivion is the seventh full-length album by American post-grunge band Smile Empty Soul. The album was released on May 25, 2018. It is the first and only album with new bassist Mark Young and drummer Victor Ribas. The singles from the album include "Sides" and "Stars", "Stars" is scheduled to have a music video released the same day of the single release. The music video for "Stars" premiered live on Alternative Press's Facebook Live on 4/13/18 as scheduled.

== Track listing ==
All tracks are written by Sean Danielsen.

No.	Title	Length
1.	"Sides"	3:57
2.	"Small Incision"	1:43
3.	"The One"	4:25
4.	"Dopamine"	4:21
5.	"Built Into The Breed"	4:09
6.	"Stars"	4:23
7.	"My Name"	3:39
8.	"Noose"	4:17
9.	"Free Oblivion"	3:50
10.	"Oblivious"	2:20
Total length:		35:04

== Personnel ==
Smile Empty Soul

- Sean Danielsen – lead vocals, lead & rhythm guitars, programming, piano, bass guitar (8, 10), producer, engineer (8, 10)
- Mark Young – bass guitar (1–7, 9)
- Victor Ribas – drums, backing vocals

Additional personnel

- Eddie Wohl – mixing
- Brian Scheffer – engineer (1–7, 9)
- Bobby Moenigmann – assistant engineer (1–7, 9)
- Maor Appelbaum – mastering
