= (The) New Release =

(the) New Release

Studio album by Primer 55
- Released: August 14, 2001
- Recorded: Early 2001
- Studios: Red Clay Studios (Suffern, New York); BearTracks Studios (Suffern, New York); Acme Studios (Mamaroneck, New York)
- Genre: Nu metal
- Length: 44:58
- Label: Island
- Producers: Bobby Burns; Eddie Wohl

Primer 55 chronology
Introduction to Mayhem (2000)	(the) New Release (2001)	Family for Life (2007)

Singles from (the) New Release
- 1. "This Life" Released: July 16, 2001

(the) New Release is the second studio album by American nu metal band Primer 55. Released on August 14, 2001, the album peaked at number one on the Billboard Heatseekers chart and number 102 on the Billboard 200. It had one single, "This Life," which peaked at number 37 on Mainstream Rock Tracks. This would be the band's final record with Island Records, who allegedly cut support shortly after the album's release due to the September 11 attacks. The band temporarily disbanded in 2003, two years after the album had released, and wouldn't be reunited until 2007's Family For Life.

== Recording ==
Primer 55 had underdone various lineup changes preceding and during the recording process of (the) New Release. After the band's first eighteen months of touring, guitarist Bobby Burns started writing the band's second major label album. He played all guitars and bass in the studio and brought in ex-Helmet drummer John Stanier. While in the studio, Burns also began talks with drummer Preston Nash of Dope with whom Primer 55 had previously toured. By May 2001, the band had officially recruited former Cut.Love.Kill bassist Chris Sprinkle but mere weeks later announced Kobie Jackson as their new bassist.

== Musical style ==
Whereas the band's major label debut, Introduction to Mayhem, boasted strong hip hop tendencies, (the) New Release demonstrated a broader variety with bluesy vocals, saxophone, and piano scattered throughout. Regarding the band's new musical direction, Bobby Burns stated "I just grew very, very sick of the whole music scene last year... All the plastic bands that were put together by record companies, etc. I didn't want to hear any of that music any longer... So I didn't... I went back to what was real to me and what made me feel good growing up... Sabbath, Zeppelin, and Kiss... Back then you could tell all those bands apart, and music of today just sounds like the same records made over and over with all the same guitar sounds and shit." Vocalist Jason "J-Sin" Luttrell remarked in 2001 that "During the writing and recording period, we never listened to the radio or watched MTV because we didn't want any outside influences creeping into the songs. We wanted everything to be fresh."

== Promotion and touring ==
By mid-May, Primer 55 announced the title and release date of their upcoming album as well as its lead single. A tentative track listing was announced in June but later modified. The band released various tracks from (the) New Release, including a rough mix of its upcoming single, on their official website in the months leading up to its release.

Although Burns had hoped to see "Texas" become the second single, (the) New Release featured only one single, "This Life" which was released to radio on July 16. It had no accompanying video but gained moderate radio rotation in late summer and early fall of 2001. The track was also included on More Fast and Furious: Music from and Inspired by the Motion Picture The Fast and the Furious and Nu Rock Traxx, Vol. 32. Promotion was allegedly cut short by Island, forcing the album's success to rely heavily on touring.

From June through August, the group joined Fear Factory's The Evolution of Revolution tour. Primer 55 then supported Vision of Disorder for some August dates. and played at the Riverfront Rampage to celebrate the 15th anniversary of the WSOU college radio station in Newark, New Jersey.

In October 2002, bassist Kobie Jackson was asked to leave the band due to "personal and creative problems." He was temporarily replaced with Toomey, formerly of 12v Negative Earth. In November and December, Primer 55 played on the Jägermeister-sponsored $12 Riot Tour with Dope, Skinlab, and Society 1.

== Reception ==
=== Commercial success ===
(the) New Release peaked at number one on the Billboard Heatseekers chart and number 102 on the Billboard 200. The album's single, "This Life" peaked at number 37 on the Mainstream Rock Tracks chart. In the week ending on November 11, the album's thirteenth week of release, SoundScan reported sales figures at 53,191.

However, despite debuting on the Billboard 200 and selling 15,000 copies in its first week, Island allegedly cut support for the album merely two months after its release. Guitarist Bobby Burns reflected on the matter in a 2008 interview, exclaiming, "It totally fucking sucked! The album was out two months then 9/11 happened and we got lost in that shuffle that was going on in New York at that time."

A music video was also allegedly in the works for "This Life," but in September 2001, Burns defused this claim, lamenting, "I have no idea what's going on with our label."

=== Critical response ===
Professional ratings
Review scores
Source	Rating
Allmusic	2.5/5 stars

Allmusic's Michael Gallucci criticizes the album, declaring, "Plenty of other bands do this stuff a whole lot better and with much more conviction."

== Track listing ==
All tracks are written by Burns/Luttrell.

No.	Title	Length
1.	"Time...Trapped Under a Rock"	0:38
2.	"This Life"	3:28
3.	"Growing"	3:06
4.	"Texas"	3:41
5.	"Tricycle"	4:50
6.	"Pills"	2:52
7.	"Lessons"	3:38
8.	"(502)"	0:25
9.	"Lou Evil"	4:25
10.	"Hesitation"	3:07
11.	"No Sleep"	3:50
12.	"My Girl"	5:39
13.	"Ricochet"	1:31
14.	"All in the Family"	3:48

=== B-sides ===
- "Feel Like You" (Included when inserting CD into CD-ROM drive, taking you to a now-defunct website [www.primer55.com/download] that allows you to download the song.)

== Charts ==
=== Album ===
Year	Chart	Position
2001	Billboard 200	102
2001	Heatseekers	1

=== Singles ===
Year	Single	Chart	Position
2001	"This Life"	Mainstream Rock Tracks	37

== Personnel ==
=== Musicians ===
- Jason "J-Sin" Luttrell – vocals
- Sam Albright — saxophone
- Bobby Burns — bass, guitar, backing vocals, mandocello, programming
- Kobie Jackson — bass (Credit only, does not play on the album)
- Preston Nash — drums, programming
- John Stanier — drums
- Eddie Wohl — piano, programming, producer, Rhodes piano, mixing

=== Production ===
- Rob Caggiano — mixing
- Frank Gargiulo — art direction, design, photography
- Matt James — vocal producer
- Michael Messier — engineer
- Rick Patrick — creative director
- Steve Regina — producer, engineer, mixing
- J.P. Sheganoski — engineer
