= Enjoy the Process =

EP by Sean Danielsen
- Released: April 16, 2013
- Genre: Alternative rock
- Length: 17:39
- Label: Independent
- Producer: Eddie Wohl

Sean Danielsen chronology
Enjoy the Process (2013)	Food Chain (2014)

Enjoy the Process is the debut EP from American recording artist Sean Danielsen, the lead vocalist and lead guitarist of American hard rock band Smile Empty Soul. Published on 16 April 2013, the album was produced by Eddie Wohl.

== Background ==
In 2013, Danielsen began performing solo work so that he can "just do whatever the song is calling for and take it to places Smile never goes" and "to have other outlets for creating work which may not fit into the Smile Empty Soul “mold”". After publishing the EP, PureGrainAudio.com released a free copy of "The Breaks", the first song on the album.

== Composition ==
Featuring six acoustic tracks performed by the singer accompanied only by his guitar, the tunes recorded for the EP were described by the vocalist as delicate, low key songs best accompanied by light guitar. Danielsen went on say that the compositions diverge from tunes typically performed by those written for Smile Empty Soul.

== Track listing ==
No.	Title	Length
1.	"The Breaks"	3:25
2.	"Dark Horse"	2:49
3.	"For the First Time"	3:12
4.	"Carousel"	3:10
5.	"Leave a Light On"	3:11
6.	"Shine"	1:52
Total length:		17:39
