= Family for Life =

EP by Primer 55
- Released: November 6, 2007
- Genres: Alternative metal; rap metal; nu metal
- Label: Crash

Primer 55 chronology
(The) New Release (2001)	Family for Life (2007)

Family for Life is an EP by Primer 55, released independently through Crash Music. released on November 6th, 2007. it is this band''s first album reuniting after a four year hiatus. It is also the last album to have J-Sin, which he died in 2017. after this album, they went back on hiatus in 2015, and then reunited again in 2025.

== Track listing ==
All tracks are written by Burns, Luttrell.

No.	Title	Length
1.	"Side to Side"	3:36
2.	"Disconnected"	3:15
3.	"Never Did Never Will"	2:46
4.	"Bullshit"	3:00
5.	"Drive It"	3:49
6.	"Release"	4:27
7.	"Texas" (Acoustic)	3:26
8.	"This Life" (Acoustic)	2:50
9.	"My Girl" (Acoustic)	6:08

== Personnel ==
=== Musicians ===
- J-Sin – vocals
- Bobby Burns – guitar
- Billy Grey – bass
- Preston Nash – drums
- John Stanier – additional drums
