= The Dead and Dreaming =

Studio album by Dry Kill Logic
- Released: October 5, 2004
- Studios: Millbrook Sound (Millbrook, New York); Red Clay (New York City)
- Genres: Nu metal; metalcore; groove metal
- Length: 37:13
- Label: Repossession
- Producers: Eddie Wohl; Phil Arcuri; Jason Bozzi

Dry Kill Logic chronology
The Darker Side of Nonsense (2001)	The Dead and Dreaming (2004)	The Magellan Complex EP (2006)

Singles from The Dead and Dreaming
- 1. "Paper Tiger" Released: 2004

Professional ratings
Review scores
Source	Rating
AllMusic	3.5/5 stars

The Dead and Dreaming is the second studio album by American heavy metal band Dry Kill Logic. It was released in the United States on October 5, 2004, by Repossession Records. The international version of the album was distributed by SPV. Only one song, "Paper Tiger", was released as a single.

== Track listing ==
No.	Title	Music	Length
1.	"Lost"	Arcuri, Bozzi, Rigano	2:33
2.	"Paper Tiger"	Arcuri, Bozzi, Rigano	3:49
3.	"Buckles"	Bozzi, Rigano	3:31
4.	"With Deepest Regrets..."	Arcuri, Bozzi, Rigano	3:50
5.	"Neither Here Nor Missed"	Arcuri, Bozzi, Rigano	4:20
6.	"The Perfect Enemy"	Arcuri, Bozzi, Rigano	2:48
7.	"Living Witness"	Arcuri, Bozzi, Rigano	2:38
8.	"One Handed Knife Fight"	Arcuri, Bozzi, Rigano	2:56
9.	"As Thick as Thieves"	Arcuri, Bozzi, Kowatch, Rigano	3:37
10.	"200 Years"	Arcuri, Bozzi, Kowatch, Rigano	3:22
11.	"No Reason"	Arcuri, Rigano	3:48
Total length:			37:13

- On some versions of the album, "No Reason" is replaced with "Hindsight".

== Personnel ==
- Cliff Rigano – lead vocals
- Phil Arcuri – guitar, drums, photography, producer
- Jason Bozzi – guitar, bass, producer
- Danny Horboychuk – bass

=== Additional personnel ===
- George Marino – mastering
- Paul Orofino – engineer, mixing
- Eddie Wohl – producer, engineer, mixing
- Rob Caggiano – guitar, engineer, producer, A&R, mixing
- Aaron Marsh – artwork, design, photography
