= Mind Control to Steal the Soul =

EP by Sean Danielsen
- Released: July 21, 2017
- Recorded: 2017
- Genre: Alternative rock
- Length: 22:19
- Label: Independent
- Producer: Sean Danielsen

Sean Danielsen chronology
Product of Isolation (2017)	Mind Control to Steal the Soul (2017)

Mind Control to Steal the Soul is the third EP from American musician Sean Danielsen. The album was independently released on 21 July 2017.

== Background ==
In March 2017, the singer informed fans through his personal Facebook page that he had plans to publish mind control to steal the soul, which was to be his third solo extended play album, on an as of then undetermined date in July of that year. The following month, Danielsen announced the release date and track listing.

In late June of that year, Danielsen announced the pre-order for his album, followed by a video teaser for "Paralyzed", the first single from the EP. He worked with film director Brooks Robinson, who has filmed motion pictures such Iron Man 3, Fantastic Four, and Inception in addition to music videos for Blink 182, No Doubt, and Weezer. The music video for the single was themed around an attempt to separate one's self from a bad situation. The music video was filmed at the Sybil Brand Institute women's correctional facility in downtown Los Angeles, California. On 20 July 2017, Danielsen published the music video.

Regarding the single, Danielsen stated that:

"The Paralyzed song and video are about escaping from something, but I'd doesn't really spell out exactly what.... leaving a lot to the imagination. I think we all have things in our lives we'd like to escape, so it's definitely a relatable theme. The prison facility (Sybil Brand Institute) we shot at in Downtown LA adds a level of creepiness that I love and this video was really fun to make."

The guitarist went on to say that:

"This EP is really different than anything I've ever released in the past, so I'm excited to hear what people think about it. It's such a different approach than a Smile Empty Soul record and I had an absolute blast making it! I hope fans can get into it even if it's something unexpected."

On August 12–13, the singer reported that he had filmed a video for "Unsaid".

== Track listing ==
All tracks are written by Sean Danielsen.

No.	Title	Length
1.	"Unsaid"	5:01
2.	"Paralyzed"	3:10
3.	"Knife Wound"	4:43
4.	"Strings"	4:30
5.	"Grit"	2:01
6.	"Inside the Mind of Idle"	2:54
Total length:		22:19
