= World Fire Brigade =

American rock band

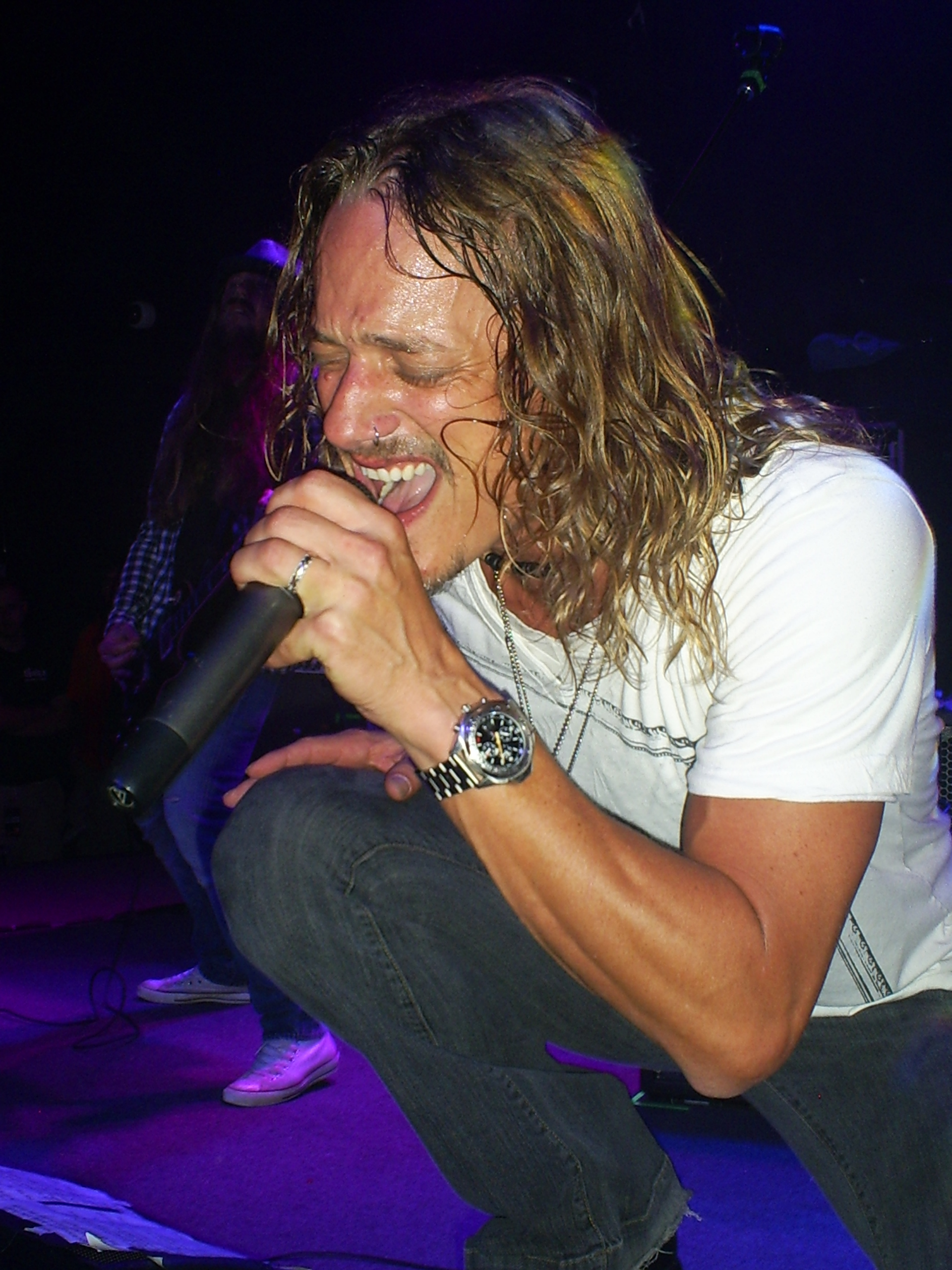

Background information
- Origin: Los Angeles, California, United States
- Genres: Hard rock, post-grunge, alternative metal
- Years active: 2009–present
- Label: FrostByte Media
- Members: Sean Danielsen; Brett Scallions; Ken Schalk; Eddie Wohl
- Website: World Fire Brigade on Facebook

World Fire Brigade is an American rock ensemble formed in 2009 by Sean Danielsen of Smile Empty Soul and Brett Scallions of American rock band Fuel.

== History ==
Originally synthesized as a partnership to prepare hard rock tunes for other musicians and ensembles, the pairing transitioned into a band after the members decided that the songs were best performed by the members themselves. Some time after partnering with Brad Stewart, the former bassist for Shinedown, the original duo joined forces with music producer and keyboard player Eddie Wohl. During the time leading up to their first album, songs released from the work were few and far between. Their very first studio album, Spreading My Wings, was released on 28 August 2012 via FrostByte Media.

== Discography ==
- Spreading My Wings (2012)
