= Spreading My Wings =

Studio album by World Fire Brigade
- Released: August 28, 2012
- Genre: Hard rock, alternative metal, post-grunge
- Length: 44:50
- Label: Frostbyte Media
- Producer: Sean Danielsen, Brett Scallions, Eddie Wohl

Spreading My Wings is the debut studio album from American rock band World Fire Brigade. The album, starring percussionist Ken Schalk of Candiria, in addition to Andy Andersson, Mike McCready and Rob Caggiano on guitar, was released on 28 August 2012 via FrostByte Media. The title track "Spreading My Wings", was published on 4 June 2012.

== Track listing ==
No.	Title	Length
1.	"The End of Silence"	0:35
2.	"Spreading My Wings"	3:35
3.	"All You Know"	3:43
4.	"Weight of the World"	3:50
5.	"Shell of Me"	4:56
6.	"Fly"	1:17
7.	"Don't Walk Away"	3:48
8.	"Take Me Away"	4:08
9.	"Shot Down"	3:50
10.	"All My Demands"	4:18
11.	"The Beginning of Madness"	0:45
12.	"Never Saw the Wall"	3:24
13.	"Free and Sane"	3:57
14.	"One"	2:44
Total length:		44:50
