= Sean Danielsen =

American musician and artistic painter (born 1982)

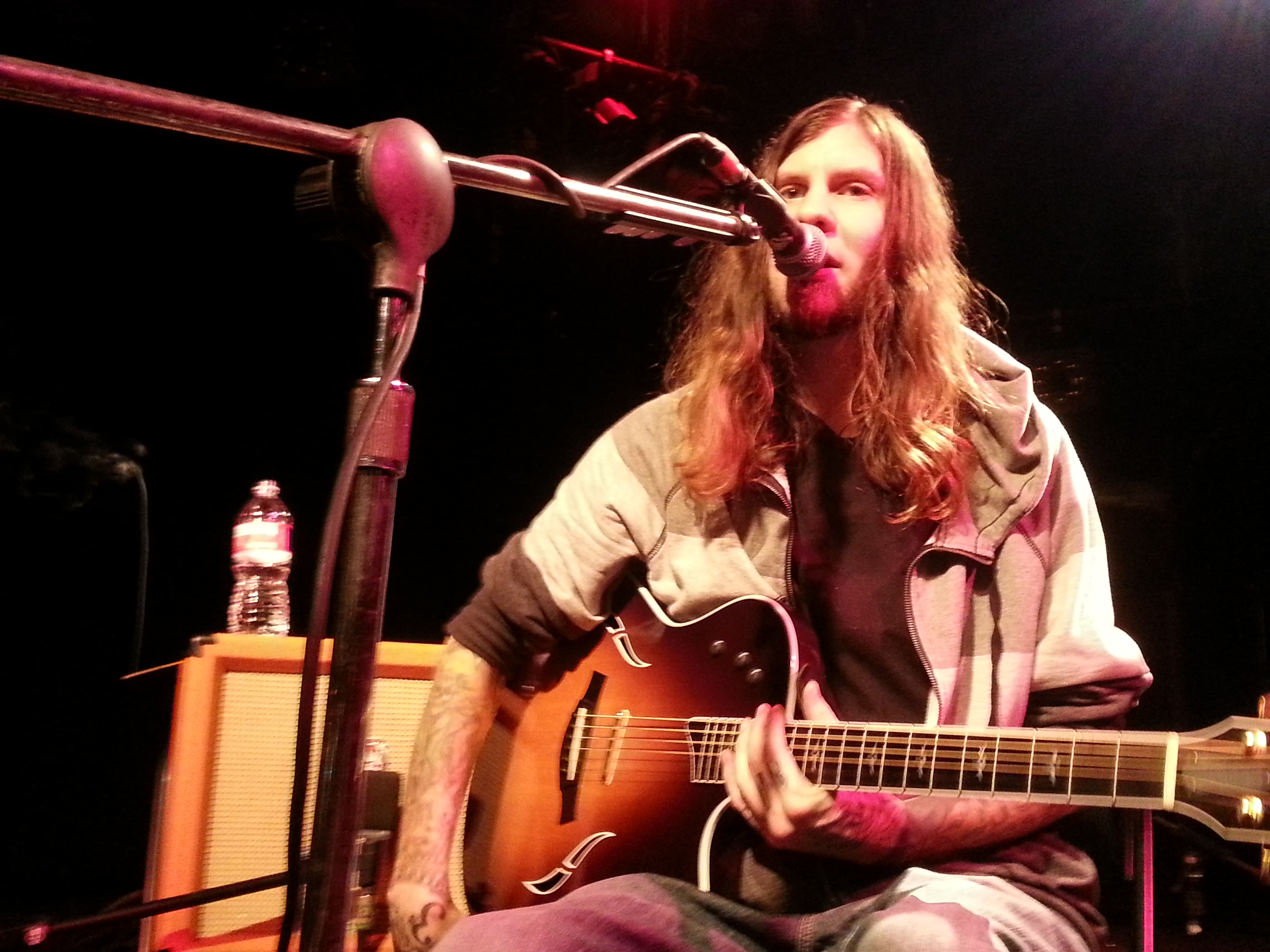
- Danielsen performing a solo acoustic music set

Background information
- Born: Sean Julian Danielsen; February 14, 1982 (age 44); El Cajon, California, U.S.
- Genres: Post-grunge; alternative rock; alternative metal; nu metal
- Occupation: Musician
- Instruments: Vocals; guitar
- Years active: 1994–present
- Labels: Bieler Bros., eOne, EMI, F.O.F. Label Group, Lava Records, Pavement Entertainment, Throwback Records, Two Disciples Entertainment
- Website: Sean Danielsen on Facebook (dead link)

Sean Julian Danielsen (born February 14, 1982) is an American musician and artistic painter, best known as the guitarist and lead vocalist of rock bands Smile Empty Soul and World Fire Brigade. In addition to creating a studio album and three independent extended play releases, Danielsen has collaborated on a Noise Refinery (West One Music) compilation album Anger Management with Mitchell Ray Marlow, the former rhythm guitarist of He Is Legend.

== Early life ==
Danielson was born in El Cajon, California, the son of Jerry Danielsen, recording artist and owner of Busy Signal Studios in Santa Clarita. When he was seven he began living at a former abandoned summer camp in Maine with his mother and other members of his family (not Jerry Danielsen). After performing in his first rock band at age 11, he moved to California midway through his teens to live with his father.

== Music career ==
=== Smile Empty Soul ===
Shortly after arriving in California, Sean Danielsen met percussionist Derek Gledhill and bassist Ryan Martin while attending neighboring high schools in Santa Clarita in 1998. Through the partnership, alternative rock band Smile Empty Soul was formed. Shortly after releasing a gold certified eponymous album in early 2003, Danielsen performed and helped compose "My Father's Daughter", which was released as a track on 24 Off the Board, rock vocalist Nina Storey's fifth studio album.

=== World Fire Brigade ===
In 2009, Danielsen formed World Fire Brigade, a rock band, with Brett Scallions of rock band Fuel. After working with former Shinedown bassist Brad Stewart, the band recruited producer Eddie Wohl to play keyboard for the band. On August 28, 2012, debut album Spreading My Wings, featuring Candiria percussionist Ken Schalk, in addition to guitarists Mike McCready and Rob Caggiano was released via FrostByte Media.

=== Solo career ===
==== Enjoy the Process ====
On 16 April 2013, Danielsen released his first solo album, Enjoy the Process. The EP, produced by Wohl, featured six acoustic tracks. Danielsen says that the songs used on the album are delicate, low key songs accompanied by light guitar and diverge from tunes typically performed by his Smile Empty Soul. After publishing the EP, PureGrainAudio.com released a free copy of "The Breaks", the first song on the album.

==== Anger Management ====
Between the release of his first two albums, he worked with former He Is Legend guitarist Mitchell Ray Marlow on "Away" and "Best in You", two songs featured on Anger Management, a compilation album released on February 27, 2014, by West One Music.

==== Food Chain (EP) ====
Danielsen's second solo album, Food Chain, featured a full band and was recorded in Babylon Studios in Van Nuys, California. Released in November 2014, the album gave Danielsen more flexibility with his music.

During late 2014 and early 2015, he toured the U.S. in support of his second EP. In September 2015, he said that he planned to publish his next solo EP in late 2016.

==== Product of Isolation ====
In October 2016, Danielsen posted on his Facebook page, that he planned to release Product of Isolation, his first full-length solo studio album in January 2017. Early in November 2016, he announced that January 13, 2017 was the planned release date for the album.

==== Mind Control to Steal the Soul ====
In March 2017, he announced that he plans to release Mind Control to Steal the Soul, his third solo EP, in July 2017. In August 2017, Danielsen announced the release date as well as song titles.

==== The Best of Sean Danielsen Solo ====
In February 2019, he released a compilation album entitled The Best of Sean Danielsen Solo, with The Best of Sean Danielsen Solo Material, Vol. 2 arriving in April 2019.

== Discography ==
=== Solo career ===
- Enjoy the Process (2013)
- Food Chain (2014)
- Product of Isolation (2017)
- Mind Control to Steal the Soul (2017)
- The Best of Sean Danielsen Solo Material (2019)
- The Best of Sean Danielsen Solo Material, Vol. 2 (2019)

=== World Fire Brigade ===
- Spreading My Wings (2012)

=== Contributions ===
- "My Father's Daughter", 24 Off the Board, Nina Storey (Nina Storey Music, 2003)
- "Looking", Deaf Ears, Jerry Danielsen featuring Jake Kilmer (Busy Signal Studios, 2009)
- "Best in You", Anger Management (West One Music, 2014)
- "Away", Anger Management (West One Music, 2014)
- "You Must Like Suffering", The Darkest of Angels, Dead by Wednesday (EMP Label Group, 2016)

=== Smile Empty Soul ===
==== Albums ====
- Smile Empty Soul (2003)
- Anxiety (2005)
- Vultures (2006)
- Consciousness (2009)
- 3's (2012)
- Chemicals (2013)
- Rarities (2017)
- Oblivion (2018)
- The Acoustic Sessions, volumes 1 and 2 (2020)
- Black Pilled (2021)
- Four Horsemen of the Apocalypse (2023)

==== Extended play albums ====
- Hecklers Veto (1999)
- B-Sides (2008)
- Shapeshifter (2016)
- Sheep (2019)
- 2020 (2020)
- Soft Songs for the Quarantined Mind (2021)
- The Loss of Everything (2022)
- Swan Song (2025)

==== Contributions ====
- "Finding Myself" – Featured on The Punisher: The Album (2004)
- "Who I Am" – Featured on Music from and Inspired by Spider-Man 2 (2004)

== Personal life ==
In July 2013, Danielsen began selling his own paintings via Facebook. In June 2016, he and his long time girlfriend, which he had been in a relationship with since 2005, were married.

For his entire music career, he had played Schecter electric and acoustic guitars. He cites Jerry Cantrell and Kim Thayil as being his favorite guitarists. Danielsen switched from Schecter to Dean and no longer uses Schecter. He is an official artist of Dean per Dean's official website.
