= Consciousness (Smile Empty Soul album) =

Studio album by Smile Empty Soul
- Released: August 25, 2009
- Recorded: 2008–2009
- Genre: Post-grunge, alternative metal, alternative rock
- Length: 44:22
- Label: F.O.F. Label Group/EMI
- Producer: Eddie Wohl

Smile Empty Soul chronology
B-Sides (2007)	Consciousness (2009)	3's (2012)

Singles from Consciousness
- 1. "Don't Ever Leave" Released: July 21, 2009; 2. "Alone with Nothing" Released: February 9, 2010; 3. "We're Through" Released: 2010

Professional ratings
Review scores
Source	Rating
AllMusic	3/5 stars
Ultimate Guitar	(8.7)

Consciousness is the fourth full-length album by American post-grunge band Smile Empty Soul. It was released on August 25, 2009. "Don't Ever Leave" was chosen as the album's first single. A music video for "Don't Ever Leave" featured actor Sean Faris. "We're Through" also included a live music video for the song.

== Track listing ==
All songs by Smile Empty Soul, except "Reflection", written by Smile Empty Soul and Eddie Wohl

No.	Title	Length
1.	"Faker"	3:21
2.	"We're Through"	3:06
3.	"Don't Ever Leave"	3:10
4.	"Compromise"	3:32
5.	"Faceless"	3:26
6.	"Stay Alive"	3:20
7.	"Walking Away"	3:21
8.	"Atoll" (Instrumental)	2:24
9.	"Ban Nuys"	5:02
10.	"Alone With Nothing"	4:02
11.	"L.A. River"	2:56
12.	"Reflection"	2:38
13.	"O'Lord"	4:00

== Personnel ==
Smile Empty Soul

- Sean Danielsen – lead vocals, lead & rhythm guitars
- Ryan Martin – bass guitar
- Jake Kilmer – drums, backing vocals

Technical personnel

- Eddie Wohl – producer, engineer
- Warren Riker – engineer
- Jeff O'Rourke – additional engineering
- Jay Baumgardner – mixing
- UE Nastasi – mastering
