= Introduction to Mayhem =

Studio album by Primer 55
- Released: January 25, 2000
- Recorded: 1999
- Studios: Red Clay Studios (Suffern, New York); Toon Factory Studios (Stamford, Connecticut); Red Zone Studios (Burbank, California)
- Genres: Nu metal; rap metal
- Length: 48:40
- Labels: Island; Fat Static
- Producers: Tom Salta; Eddie Wohl

Primer 55 chronology
As Seen on TV (1999)	Introduction to Mayhem (2000)	(The) New Release (2001)

Singles from Introduction to Mayhem
- 1. "Loose" Released: 1999

Professional ratings
Review scores
Source	Rating
AllMusic	2.5/5 stars
Blabbermouth	6/10
Kerrang!	1/5 stars

Introduction to Mayhem is the debut studio album by the American nu metal band Primer 55. Released on January 25, 2000, it is a reissue of the band's 1999 EP As Seen on TV.

Much of the tracks were remixed to sound drastically different from the original EP versions, including the addition of the new hip hop instrumentation. Several bonus tracks were also added, and tracks that appeared on the original EP were deleted.

Introduction to Mayhem was the band's first release on a major label. (həd) Planet Earth frontman Jared Gomes makes a guest appearance rapping on one of the new songs. Four of the songs also featured scratching from DJ Chris Kilmore of Incubus, including on the single "Loose".

The original EP, As Seen on TV, was reissued in 2012, under the title The Big Fuck You.

== Music and lyrics ==
Bobby Burns stated that the album's lyrical themes were inspired by life in Memphis, the city in which the band originally formed before they relocated to Louisville, Kentucky. He said in 2000, "I don't know if you've ever been to downtown Memphis, but I feel more comfortable walking around the streets of New York City alone at night. Memphis is in the south; there's racism, and a lot of the 'this person hates the next person' mentality. I wasn't raised that way. There were always people down there starting trouble. And it wasn't just the junkies, there were also hillbilly pickup truck drivers and a lot of college kids that would come down there, waving their rebel flags. There were car chases and shootings all the time. Living with that made us, and that's what Introduction to Mayhem is all about."

"Loose" was the first song Primer 55 ever wrote following their formation in 1997. Regarding "The Big Fuck You", Burns stated it was dedicated to "all of the people that piss us off, because the world's not a big enough place for people to be dicks to each other."

== Reception ==
Blabbermouth.net labelled Introduction to Mayhem as "a heavier, more aggressive early Limp Bizkit." Steve Huey of AllMusic compared the album to Korn, Helmet, Everlast, and Insane Clown Posse, noting that it mixed hip hop and hard rock with "theatrical aggression." He remarked "The rap side of the equation doesn't always have the ring of authenticity -- it often seems more like a pose designed for effect than the product of a lived-in culture -- but whether that's a concern for you or not, their music is undeniably hard-hitting, great for fans of alternative metal and rap metal."

Christopher J. Kelter of Rough Edge wrote "Primer 55 could be loosely grouped into the burgeoning rap metal scene; however, the term rap metal would be doing Primer 55 an injustice – hip hop and hardcore is more like it." Lyrically, he says the album is "smack dab in the middle of an urban battlefield [and] the band are not strangers to inner-city dangers."

On the album's 20th anniversary in 2020, Spanish site Rocknvox reflected "Primer 55 came out with some solid rap metal on this re-released debut album. The lead single 'Loose' remains a popular nu metal anthem, and the dual voices of Bobby Burns and J-Sin work very well together. The album cover is also great."

== Track listing ==
All songs by Burns/Luttrell

No.	Title	Length
1.	"Loose"	3:12
2.	"Something Wicked This Way Comes"	0:08
3.	"Supa Freak Love"	3:47
4.	"G's"	3:37
5.	"Chaos"	0:30
6.	"Pigs"	3:27
7.	"Stain"	3:39
8.	"Revolution"	1:12
9.	"Set It Off"	3:12
10.	"Hey Bubba"	0:08
11.	"Introduction To Mayhem"	3:37
12.	"Dose"	5:15
13.	"The Big F*** You"	4:20
14.	"Violence"	3:16
15.	"Hate"	4:22
16.	"Funhouse"	0:22
17.	"Tripinthehead"	4:50
18.	"The Curse Factory"	0:05

== Personnel ==
- Mike "Jr." Christopher – bass
- Josh McLane – drums
- Bobby Burns – guitar, bass, vocals, art direction
- Jason "J-Sin" Luttrell – vocals

Guest musicians

- Jared "M.C.U.D." Gomes - vocals (on "Set It Off")
- Chris Kilmore - turntable
- Rafael "Flip" Hernandez - vocals (on "Dose")
- Rob Caggiano - vocals (whispers) (on "Dose")
- Mark Harrington - vocals (on "The Big Fuck You")

Production

- Tom Salta - producer, engineering, mixing, programming
- Eddie Wohl - producer, engineering, mixing
- George Marino - mastering
- Rick Patrick - art direction
- Steve Sticker - photography
- Peter Weinheimer - photography
- Supa Corn - album illustration
