= Paper Tiger (yacht) =

The Paper Tiger catamaran is a class of yacht. There are Paper Tiger fleets around Australia and New Zealand. Regular State, National and International Championships are conducted.

== Specifications ==
- Length overall 4.26 metres (14.0 ft)
- Beam 2.13 metres (7.0 ft)
- Sail area 9.29 square metres (100.0 sq ft)
- Mast 6.78 metres (22.2 ft)
- Weight rigged (approximate) 73 kilograms (161 lb)
- Min. Hull Weight (unrigged) 50 kilograms (110 lb)
