= Bottom of a Bottle =

2003 single by Smile Empty Soul

Single by Smile Empty Soul

from the album Smile Empty Soul
- Released: March 25, 2003
- Genre: Nu metal; post-grunge
- Length: 3:42
- Label: Lava
- Songwriters: Sean Danielsen, Derek Gledhill, Ryan Martin
- Producer: John Lewis Parker

Smile Empty Soul singles chronology
"Bottom of a Bottle" (2003)	"Nowhere Kids" (2003)

"Bottom of a Bottle" is the debut single from the American rock band Smile Empty Soul's eponymous album. The song was released in 2003 and reached No. 7 on the Billboard Modern Rock Tracks chart.

== Composition and lyrics ==
Contrary to some of the lyrics, the song talks about influencing people to do whatever it is that keeps them going and makes them feel alive, indicating that the word "drug" is a metaphor for the same.

=== Featured on ===
- Xtreme Sessionz, Vol. 1 (Lava Room)
- Nu Rock Traxx, Vol. 49 (Erg)
- Promo Only: Modern Rock Radio

== Personnel ==
- Sean Danielsen – vocals, guitar, writer
- Ryan Martin – bass, writer
- Derek Gledhill – drums, writer
- John Lewis Parker – producer
- David J. Holman – mixing

== Chart performance ==
Chart (2003)	Peak position
US Bubbling Under Hot 100 Singles (Billboard)	7
US Modern Rock Tracks (Billboard)	7
US Mainstream Rock Tracks (Billboard)	8
