= Eddie Wohl =

American composer, musician, and producer

- Born: United States
- Genres: Hard rock; heavy metal; pop
- Occupations: Composer; music producer; mixing engineer
- Instruments: Keyboard; guitar
- Years active: 1990–present
- Labels: Epic; Elektra; Mercury/Island; Roadrunner
- Website: eddiewohl.com

Eddie Wohl is an American composer, music producer, and mixing engineer.

== Career ==
As a musician, Wohl was signed to Epic, Elektra and Mercury/Island, and had a production deal with Roadrunner Records. Growing up on the East Coast, Wohl was in his first band at age 15 and signed his first record deal at the age of 25. Wohl's major influences growing up included Black Sabbath, Stevie Wonder, Public Enemy and McCoy Tyner. In 1999, Wohl, along with his partners, launched the New York-based Scrap 60 Productions, which was responsible for producing acts such as Anthrax, Ill Nino and H_{2}O, among others.

Wohl's producing credits include a variety of acts, from metal Fuel, Anthrax, and Smile Empty Soul, to glam-punker Jesse Mallin and pop artist/American Idol judge Kara Dioguardi. He has produced records featuring performances by Bruce Springsteen, Robby Krieger, Roger Daltrey, Chino Moreno, Jakob Dylan, Josh Homme, Chris Shiflett, Jada Pinkett Smith, and Dimebag Darrell.

As a composer, Wohl has received six Emmy Awards. three time Telly Award, three time Pro Max Award and Mark Award. Some TV appearances of his music include Super Bowl XLVII, The CBS Super Bowl Pre-Game show, "CBS Super Bowl 50th Anniversary" spots the NFL on CBS, NBA on NBC, The Rio Olympics, The NHL, NCAA Basketball, PGA Golf on CBS, Young Sheldon, and The Late Late Show with Craig Ferguson.

== Discography ==
Information as per allmusic.com
Year	Album	Artist	Role
1990	Lost in the Wild	Melidian	Guest artist, keyboards
1995	Redbelly	Redbelly	Producer, guitarist, composer
1997	Hipnosis	Shootyz Groove	Pre-production assistant
1999	Cup of Tea	Pepperfarm	Producer, engineer, mixer
2000	Malcolm in the Middle	(Film)	Producer
2000	Introduction to Mayhem	Primer 55	Producer, engineer, mixer
2000	Dis-Tor-Tions	Liquid Logic	Producer
2000	Can't Breathe	Boiler Room	Interlude

== Mixing credits ==
=== 2015 ===
- Reign of Terror – Terror Universal

== Production credits ==
=== 2016 ===
- Shapeshifter – Smile Empty Soul

=== 2014 ===
- Food Chain – Sean Danielsen
- Puppet Strings – Fuel
- Till Death, La Familia – Ill Nino

=== 2013 ===
- Chemicals – Smile Empty Soul
- Enjoy the Process – Sean Danielsen

=== 2012 ===
- 3's – Smile Empty Soul
- Spreading My Wings – World Fire Brigade

=== 2009 ===
- Consciousness – Smile Empty Soul

=== 2008 ===
- Enigma – Ill Niño

=== 2007 ===
- Glitter in the Gutter – Jesse Malin

=== 2006 ===
- The Best of Ill Niño – Ill Niño
- Of Vengeance and Violence – Dry Kill Logic

=== 2005 ===
- One Nation Underground – Ill Niño

=== 2002 ===
- All We Want – H_{2}O
- Bitterness the Star – 36 Crazyfists

=== 2001 ===
- (The) New Release – Primer 55

=== 2000 ===
- Introduction to Mayhem – Primer 55
