= Vultures (Smile Empty Soul album) =

Studio album by Smile Empty Soul
- Released: October 24, 2006
- Genre: Alternative metal; post-grunge
- Length: 63:50
- Label: Bieler Bros.
- Producer: James Murray; Smile Empty Soul

Smile Empty Soul chronology
Anxiety (2005)	Vultures (2006)	B-Sides (2007)

Professional ratings
Review scores
Source	Rating
Ultimate Guitar	(8.8)
IGN Music	(6.1)

Vultures is the third studio album by American rock band Smile Empty Soul. The album was released on October 24, 2006, by Bieler Bros. Records.

== Track listing ==
All tracks are written by Smile Empty Soul.

No.	Title	Length
1.	"Out to Sea"	3:41
2.	"The Hit"	3:43
3.	"Loser"	4:02
4.	"Jesus Is the Manager at Wal-Mart"	3:08
5.	"The Freaks Are Coming"	4:03
6.	"Morning Light"	3:45
7.	"Adjustments"	3:00
8.	"Here's to Another"	3:29
9.	"Disease"	4:23
10.	"Live Forever"	3:15
11.	"Better Off Alone"	4:05
12.	"Vultures"	3:29
13.	"Hollywood" (hidden track)	4:48

Notes

- "Hollywood" is embedded with "Vultures" as a hidden track and begins at 18:30.

== Personnel ==
Smile Empty Soul

- Sean Danielsen – vocals, lead guitar
- Ryan Martin – bass guitar
- Mike Booth – rhythm guitar
- Jake Kilmer – drums

Technical personnel

- James Murray – producer, engineer, mixing
- Smile Empty Soul – producer
- Kennie Takahashi – additional engineering
- Fred Archambault – additional engineering
- Kevin Bartley – mastering
