= Smile Empty Soul (album) =

2003 studio album by Smile Empty Soul

Studio album by Smile Empty Soul
- Released: May 27, 2003
- Genre: Post-grunge; nu metal
- Length: 53:08
- Label: Lava
- Producer: John Lewis Parker

Smile Empty Soul chronology
Smile Empty Soul (2003)	Anxiety (2005)

Singles from Smile Empty Soul
- 1. "Bottom of a Bottle" Released: March 25, 2003; 2. "Nowhere Kids" Released: October 14, 2003; 3. "Silhouettes" Released: March 2, 2004

Professional ratings
Review scores
Source	Rating
Allmusic	2/5 stars

Smile Empty Soul is the debut studio album by American rock band Smile Empty Soul. The album was released on May 27, 2003 via Lava Records. Three singles were released from the album: "Bottom of a Bottle", "Silhouettes" and "Nowhere Kids". In March 2005, the album was certified gold with sales in excess of 500,000.

== Track listing ==
All tracks are written by Sean Danielsen, Ryan Martin, Derek Gledhill, and John Lewis Parker.

No.	Title	Length
1.	"Bottom of a Bottle"	3:42
2.	"Silhouettes"	3:53
3.	"Nowhere Kids"	4:17
4.	"This Is War"	4:29
5.	"Therapy"	3:05
6.	"For You"	4:14
7.	"Your Way"	3:06
8.	"The Other Side"	3:59
9.	"Every Sunday"	3:46
10.	"With This Knife"	3:44
11.	"Radio in a Hole"	3:09
12.	"All My Problems"	3:18
13.	"I Want My Life"	4:15
14.	"Eraser"	4:14

== Personnel ==
Smile Empty Soul

- Sean Danielsen – vocals, guitar
- Ryan Martin – bass, vocals
- Derek Gledhill – drums, vocals

Additional musicians

- Keb' Mo' – national steel guitar (8)
- Bruce Dukov – violin (4)
- Darious Campo – violin (4)
- Janet Lakatos – viola (4)
- Dennis Karmazyn – cello (4)
- Nico Abondolo – string bass (4)
- Claude Foisy – string arrangement and conducting (4)

Technical personnel

- John Lewis Parker – producer, string arrangement (4)
- Francis Buckley – engineer
- David J. Holman – mixing
- Bernie Grundman – mastering

== Charts ==
Chart (2003)	Peak position
US Billboard 200	94
US Top Heatseekers (Billboard)	2

== Certifications ==
Region	Certification	Certified units/sales
United States (RIAA)	Gold	500,000^{^}
^{^} Shipments figures based on certification alone.

== See also ==
- List of anti-war songs
