= Smile Empty Soul =

American rock band

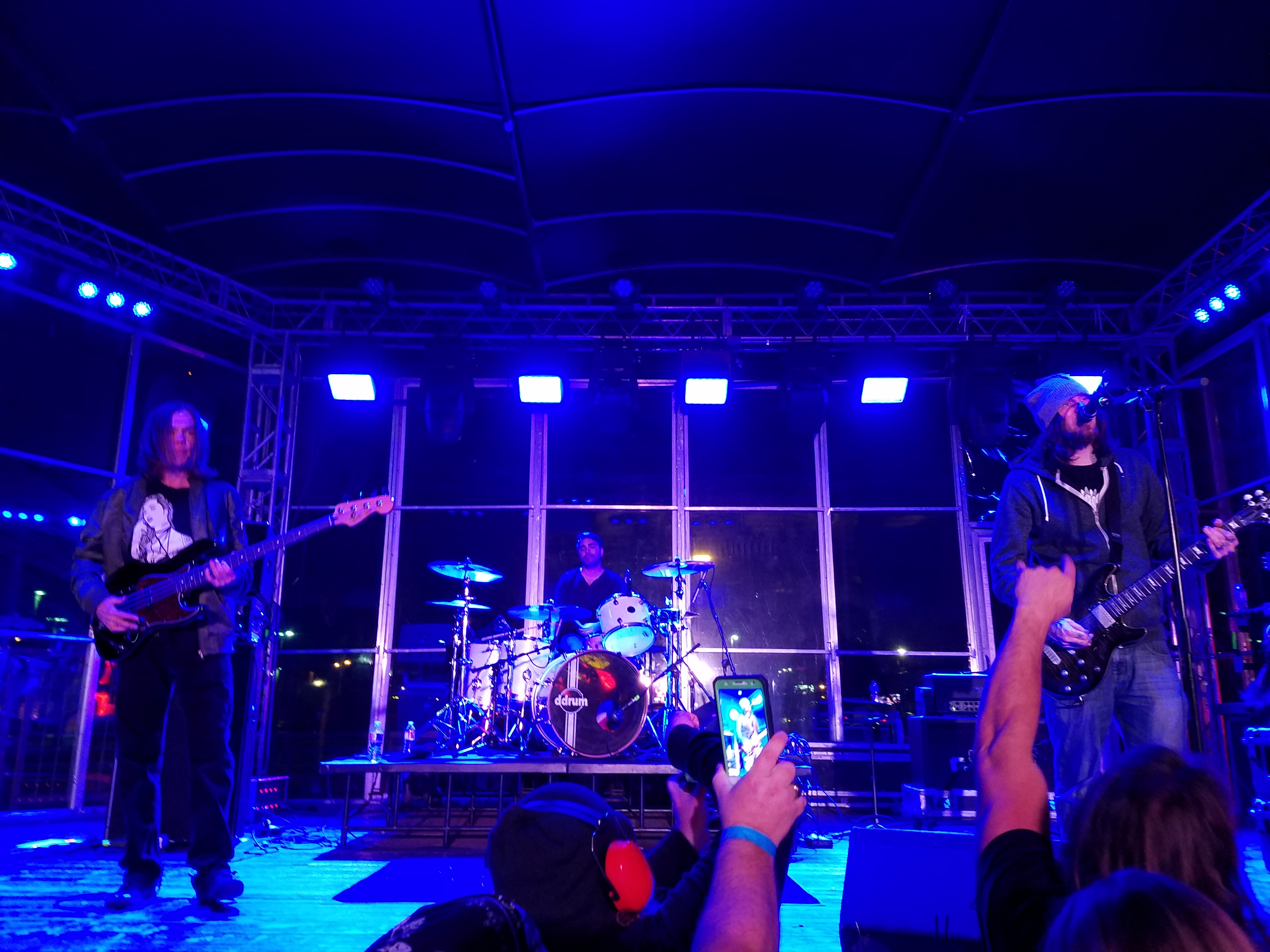
- Smile Empty Soul in 2018, from left to right: Mark Young, Victor Ribas, Sean Danielsen

Background information
- Also known as: Hecklers Veto (1998–2001)
- Origin: Santa Clarita, California, U.S.
- Genres: Post-grunge; alternative rock; alternative metal; nu metal
- Years active: 1998–present
- Labels: Lava; MRAfia; F.O.F.; EMI; Bieler Bros.; eOne; Pavement; Two Disciples; Smile Empty
- Members: Sean Danielsen; Jon Loree
- Past members: Derek Gledhill; Dominic Weir; Mike Booth; Ryan Martin; Jake Kilmer; Mark Young; Victor Ribas; Ty Del Rose
- Website: smileemptysoul.com

Smile Empty Soul is an American rock band, originally from Santa Clarita, California. It was started in 1998 by Sean Danielsen (vocals and guitar), Ryan Martin (bass), and Derek Gledhill (drums). After the departure of Gledhill and Martin from the band in 2005 and 2017, respectively, Danielsen remains the only founding member active as the band's primary songwriter, frontman, and its leader.

== History ==
=== Beginnings (1998–2003) ===
Smile Empty Soul formed in 1998, while its original members attended different high schools in the Santa Clarita area. The band, originally a three-piece group, consisted of vocalist and guitarist Sean Danielsen, bassist Ryan Martin and drummer Derek Gledhill.

After playing numerous hometown gigs, Smile Empty Soul ventured to the Sunset Strip. They later gave a demo to John Parker of ThroBack Records, a Los Angeles indie label leading later on to a record deal with Jason Flom's Lava Records.

=== Self-titled debut album (2003–2005) ===
On May 27, 2003, the band released their self-titled debut album Smile Empty Soul. The album was produced by John Lewis Parker and mixed by David J. Holman. Three singles, "Bottom of a Bottle", "Nowhere Kids", and "Silhouettes" were released via the recording. In March 2005, the album was certified gold with sales of 500,000+ units.

=== Anxiety (2005–2006) ===
In 2005, before the recording of their second album Anxiety was finished, drummer Derek Gledhill was replaced by Flickerstick percussionist Dominic Weir. Their album Anxiety was not released at the time, due to the band parting ways with Lava Records after the company refused to release their record.

On July 13, 2006, Smile Empty Soul signed with independent label, Bieler Bros. Records. At that point, drummer Dominic Weir had been replaced by Jake Kilmer and Mike Booth (formerly of Cold) was added as a second guitarist.

=== Vultures (2006–2009) ===
On October 24, 2006, the band released Vultures, the official follow-up to their 2003 Smile Empty Soul. The album does not feature songs from the unreleased Anxiety. The first single released on Vultures was the song "The Hit".

Vultures debuted at No. 169 on the Billboard 200 album charts with just over 5,000 copies sold. The band then embarked on a tour with The Exies. In late April 2007, the band parted ways with Mike Booth, which was a mutual split. The band did not replace him continuing on as a 3 piece. The trio started recording their next record in Greenville, South Carolina on February 1, 2008.

=== Consciousness and More Anxiety (2009–2012) ===
Soon after the recording for their album entitled Consciousness was finished, the band recorded a few more songs. Later, the band confirmed that they had signed with F.O.F./EMI records. Consciousness was released in August 2009.

In November 2009, the 2005 album Anxiety was released on iTunes. On March 9, 2010, More Anxiety, a special edition of Anxiety including a bonus DVD was released. Smile Empty Soul released music videos for "We're Through" and "Faker" from Consciousness.

In 2009, it was announced that Danielsen formed a new group called World Fire Brigade with Fuel vocalist Brett Scallions. Ir also consisted of bassist Brad Stewart (ex-Shinedown) and former Candiria drummer Ken Schalk. The debut studio album, entitled Spreading My Wings, was released in August 2012 through FrostByte Media.

=== 3's (2012–2013) ===
On March 14, 2012, it was announced that Smile Empty Soul had signed with eOne. They released 3's with eOne on May 22, 2012.

In March 2012, "Afterlife", the first single from 3's, was released. In April 2013, Danielsen released his solo EP Enjoy the Process and later, October 1, 2013 was announced as the expected date of release.

=== Chemicals (2013–2015) ===
In June 2013 it was announced that Smile Empty Soul formed Two Disciples Entertainment, an imprint label, in conjunction with Pavement Entertainment and would release Chemicals in the fall of 2013.

On November 3, 2014, Danielsen released a second solo EP entitled Food Chain.

=== Shapeshifter (2015–2017) ===
In September 2015, Smile Empty Soul announced on their Facebook that an EP and DVD release was expected in early 2016. In November 2015, the band published the artwork for the EP. The title for the EP was announced in January 2016 as Shapeshifter and the release date is to be April 1, 2016.

=== Rarities, Oblivion and Sheep (2017–present) ===
In October 2016, the band said on Facebook that in early 2017, a compilation album consisting of 13 rare and unreleased tracks would come out. On December 10, 2016, the compilation album title was announced as Rarities and artwork and some track names were announced.

In September 2017, they announced via Facebook that Kilmer and Martin would leave Smile Empty Soul, leaving Danielsen as the only original band member. Mark Young, originally from Hed PE and Victor Ribas, originally from HURT, joined the band as both touring and recording musicians on bass and drums/percussion/vocals respectively. In May 2018, Young announced his departure from the band.

On February 7, 2019 it was announced that Smile Empty Soul would release an acoustic EP, The Acoustic Sessions. Volume 1 In August 2019, Danielsen announced that the ensemble planned to release an EP entitled Sheep. On February 14, 2020 he showed gear related to a new project on Smile Empty Soul Page with a caption "Interesting things to come" revealing that Smile Empty Soul would continue with only two band members. On May 18, 2020, it was announced on Facebook along with album art that Acoustic Sessions Vol.2 would be recorded.

On July 2, 2020, the duo announced that since they were unable to tour due to the pandemic, they would record an EP titled 2020.

== Band members ==
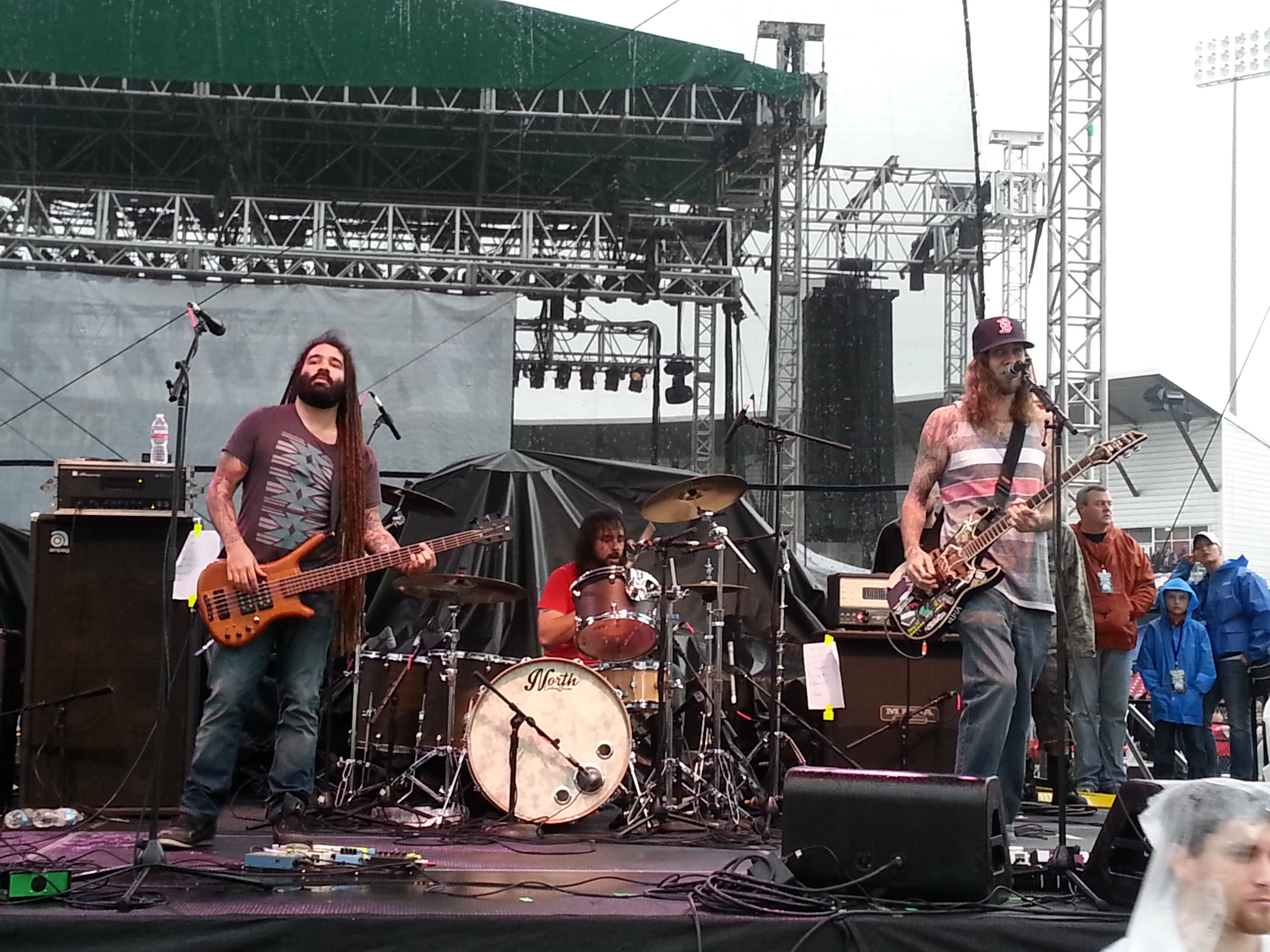
Smile Empty Soul performing at South by So What?! music festival in Texas, March 2014

Current members

- Sean Danielsen – lead vocals, lead & rhythm guitars (1998–present).
- Jon Loree – drums (2024–present)

Former members

- Derek Gledhill – drums, backing vocals (1998–2005)
- Dominic Weir – drums (2005–2006)
- Mike Booth – lead guitars (2006–2007)
- Ryan Martin – bass, backing vocals (1998–2017)
- Jake Kilmer – drums, backing vocals (2006–2017)
- Mark Young – bass guitar (2017–2018)
- Victor Ribas – drums, backing vocals (2017–2018)
- Ty Del Rose – drums (2018–2024)

Former touring members

- Chris Berryman – guitar (2004)
- Phil Lipscomb – bass guitar (2014)
- Preston Rodgers – bass guitar (2018)
- John LeCompt – bass guitar (2018)
- Tom Minogue – bass guitar (2019)
- Jody Linnell – bass guitar (2019)

Timeline

== Discography ==
- Smile Empty Soul (2003)
- Vultures (2006)
- Consciousness (2009)
- 3's (2012)
- Chemicals (2013)
- Oblivion (2018)

== Notes ==
- A "Bottom of a Bottle" did not enter the Billboard Hot 100, but peaked at number 7 on the Bubbling Under Hot 100 Singles chart, which acts as a 25-song extension to the Hot 100.
