= Chemicals (album) =

Studio album by Smile Empty Soul
- Released: October 1, 2013
- Recorded: 2013
- Genre: Post-grunge, alternative metal, alternative rock
- Length: 35:25
- Label: Pavement Entertainment
- Producer: Eddie Wohl

Smile Empty Soul chronology
3's (2012)	Chemicals (2013)	Shapeshifter (2016)

Singles from Chemicals
- 1. "False Alarm" Released: August 27, 2013

Chemicals is the sixth full-length album by American post-grunge band Smile Empty Soul. The album was released on October 1, 2013, and "finally [got] a proper European release" said Sean Danielsen. The album is also supposed to have a "half live feel and half studio feel" said Danielsen in an interview. The album cover is designed and painted by Sean, Ryan & Jake. On August 10, 2013 Smile Empty Soul announced their first single, "False Alarm". On October 21, 2013 Smile Empty Soul released a music video for "False Alarm", the video was filmed at the Machine Shop in Flint Michigan during "The Merican Chemicals Tour" & official CD release party for Chemicals.

== Track listing ==
All tracks are written by Smile Empty Soul, except "Balance", written by Smile Empty Soul and John Parker. All lyrics are written by Sean Danielsen.

No.	Title	Length
1.	"Black and Blue"	3:12
2.	"False Alarm"	3:21
3.	"Chemicals"	5:02
4.	"Balance"	3:14
5.	"Swim"	3:12
6.	"New Low"	3:20
7.	"Real"	3:20
8.	"Sitting Ducks"	3:59
9.	"Mechanical Rationality"	3:38
10.	"Landslide"	4:27
Total length:		35:25

== Personnel ==
Smile Empty Soul

- Sean Danielsen – lead vocals, lead & rhythm guitars
- Ryan Martin – bass guitar
- Jake Kilmer – drums, backing vocals

Technical personnel

- Eddie Wohl – producer, mixing, engineer
- Ken Eisennagel – additional engineering
- Warren Riker – additional engineering (9, 10)
- Paul Lotus – mastering
