= Primer 55 =

American nu metal band

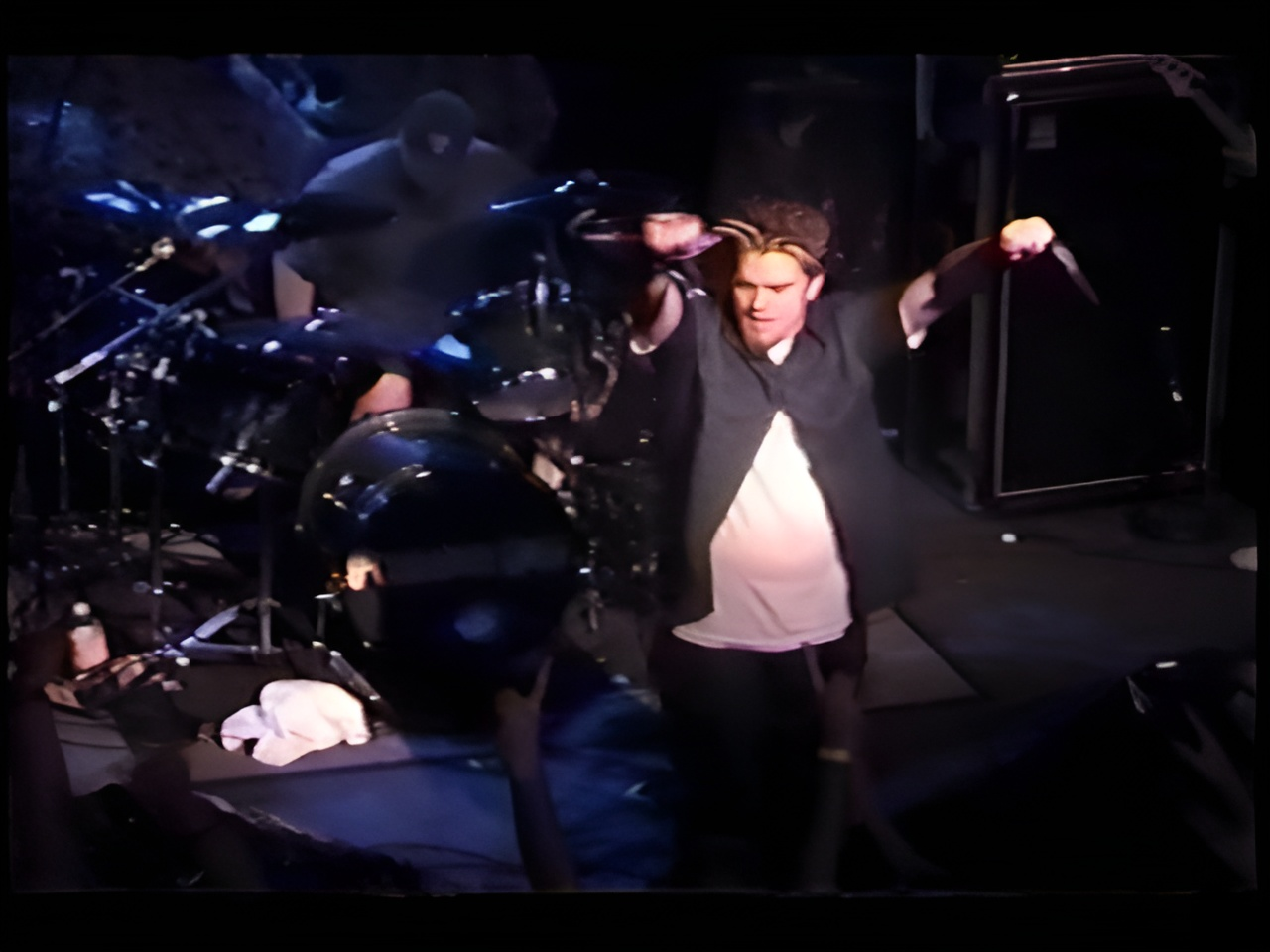
- Primer 55 live at Water Street Hall - Rochester, NY

Background information
- Origin: Memphis, Tennessee, U.S.
- Genres: Nu metal; rap metal; alternative metal
- Years active: 1997–2003; 2007–2015; 2025–present
- Labels: Island; KEG; Family for Life
- Members: Bobby Burns; Joshua Toomey; Donny "The DRP" Polinske; Preston Nash
- Past members: See members section

Primer 55 is an American nu metal band formed in Memphis, Tennessee in 1997. Primer 55 has released two studio albums: Introduction to Mayhem (2000) and (The) New Release (2001). After disbanding for the first time in 2003 and reuniting from 2007 to 2015, the band announced another reunion in June 2025.

== History ==
=== Formation and early days (1997–1998) ===
Primer 55 was formed in 1997 in Memphis, Tennessee by guitarist Bobby Burns and vocalist J-Sin. The two met when J-Sin's previous band was the opening act for Burns' previous band. Burns' heavy metal music influences and J-Sin's hip hop influences melded to create the band's rap rock sound. Bassist Mike "Jr." Christopher and drummer Josh McLane were then added to complete the lineup.

Burns has said that band's name refers to the concept of a primer as "something that's unfinished", and Interstate 55, "the road that drugs run on to get to Chicago through Memphis".

=== Record deal, Introduction to Mayhem and (The) New Release (1999–2002) ===
After releasing an EP on the independent label Propellant Transmissions, Primer 55 signed a contract with Island Records and reissued the EP as their debut album, Introduction to Mayhem on January 25, 2000. The remixed and reconstructed album features appearances from Incubus turntablist Chris Kilmore, Hed PE frontman Jared Gomes, and Relative Ash frontman Mark Harrington.

The band toured with Biohazard, Slipknot, Machine Head and Dope before scoring a slot as a second-stage performer on the Ozzfest 2000 festival tour. Then, in September 2000, Primer 55 toured alongside Soulfly, downset., and Slaves on Dope. During this time the band experienced several line-up changes, a pattern that would continue on through the recording of their next album and beyond.

On August 14, 2001, Primer 55 released their second studio album, (the) New Release. It went to number 1 on the Billboard Heatseekers Chart and No. 102 on the Billboard 200. The album's single, "This Life" peaked at No. 37 on Billboard's Mainstream Rock Tracks Chart. After the album's initial success, it was suddenly shelved by Island Records. Burns told PureGrainAudio, "The album was out 2 months then 9/11 happened and we got lost in that shuffle that was going on in NY at that time."

Despite having their album shelved, the band embarked on "The $12 Riot Tour" on October 31 with Dope, Skinlab and Society 1. The next year, Primer 55 performed as the opening act at the 2002 Gathering of the Juggalos in Peoria, Illinois.

=== First hiatus (2003–2006) ===
In 2003, the band went on hiatus after struggles with record labels and internal issues among bandmates. Burns joined Soulfly, a band he had met while touring with Ozzfest 2000. He toured the world and released four albums as the band's bass player. J-Sin would unfortunately battle alcohol and drug addiction, with Burns later describing him as not "in any shape to tour or anything like that for a really long time."

=== Reformation, aborted third album and second hiatus (2007–2024) ===
When Soulfly went on hiatus in 2007, Crash Music contacted Burns, inspiring him to reform Primer 55 with J-Sin and join fellow Crash Music band Love Said No. The "Crash Music Metal Crusade Tour" took both bands out on the road together in late 2007 and the band released the EP Family for Life, a collection of previously unreleased tracks recorded between 1998 and 2002, on November 6.

At an early 2008 performance, rapper Donny "The DRP" Polinske attended a Primer 55 performance in hopes of interesting Burns and J-Sin to guest on a track for his solo album. After only three weeks of touring, however, J-Sin was forced to exit the band due to poor performances and costly antics caused by continued drug and alcohol addictions that would eventually land him in rehab. While J-Sin was replaced temporarily by Heath Joyce, a longtime friend of Burns, officially The DRP would become Primer 55's next vocalist, performing with the band at the 2008 Gathering of the Juggalos alongside 2 Live Crew, Ice-T, and Twiztid.

In 2009, Primer 55 released the song "Flexin'" with an accompanying music video. A full-length album titled New American Gangsters was in the works until January 2010 when Burns fired all of the other band members. Later that year, the band's MySpace page announced that J-Sin had returned to the band, yet the band also resumed recording and performing with The DRP.

In early 2012, Primer 55 began playing acoustic sets through the midwestern and southeastern United States after Burns was inspired by watching old MTV Unplugged performances by bands like Nirvana and Korn. In 2012, As Seen on TV was reissued under the title The Big Fuck You, with bonus tracks.

Primer 55 went on indefinite hiatus on October 7, 2015, as Burns would work on his band, Murder the Flesh.

On August 10, 2018, J-Sin died at the age of 40 after a longtime battle with Hepatitis C.

During December 2019, there was talk of new shows to commemorate the 20th anniversary of Introduction to Mayhem in 2020.

=== Second reunion (2025–present) ===
On June 1, 2025, it was confirmed that Primer 55 had once again reunited, with the lineup featuring vocalist Donny "The DRP" Polinske, guitarist Bobby Burns, bassist Joshua Toomey and drummer Preston Nash.

== Members ==
=== Current members ===
- Bobby Burns – guitars (1997–2003, 2007–2015, 2025–present), vocals (2010–2015)
- Joshua Toomey – bass (2003, 2007–2008, 2025–present)
- Donny "DRP" Polinske – vocals (2008–2010, 2011, 2025–present)
- Saxton Dover – drums (2026–present)

=== Former members ===
- Jason "J-Sin" Luttrell – vocals (1997–2003, 2007, 2010); died 2018
- Mike "Jr." Christopher – bass (1997–2001)
- Josh McLane – drums (1997–2000)
- Kevin Jackson – drums (2000)
- John Kamoosi – drums (2000–2001)
- Kobie Jackson – bass (2001–2003)
- Billy Grey – guitar (2007)
- Frank Fontsere – drums (2007)
- Tim Lau – drums (2007)
- Curt Taylor – bass (2008–2009)
- Mikey Terito – drums (2008–2009)
- Matty Time – bass (2011–2012)
- Heath Shaw – drums (2011–2014)
- Nic Bell – bass (2012–2014)
- Joey Busciglio – guitar (2013–2015)
- Grover Norton – drums (2014–2015)
- Darren Walling – bass (2014–2015)
- Preston Nash – drums (2001–2003, 2025–2026)

Timeline

== Discography ==
=== Albums ===
Album information
Introduction to Mayhem
- Released: January 25, 2000 (U.S.)
- Label: Island
- Chart positions: –
- US sales: 100,000+
(The) New Release
- Released: August 14, 2001 (U.S.)
- Label: Island
- Chart positions: No. 102 (Billboard 200)
- US sales: 75,000+

=== Other releases ===
- As Seen on TV (1999)
- Bootleg I/Bootleg II (2005)
- Family for Life (2007)
- The Big Fuck You (2012)
- Living The Dream By Surviving The Nightmare (2014)

=== Singles ===
- "Loose" (2000)
- "Set It Off" (2000)
- "Appetite for Destruction" (2000)
- "This Life" (2001)
