= África Brasil =

Studio album by Jorge Ben
- Released: 1976
- Studio: Phonogram (Rio de Janeiro)
- Genre: MPB; samba funk; samba rock; soul
- Length: 41:01
- Label: Philips
- Producer: Marco Mazzola

Jorge Ben chronology
Gil e Jorge (1975)	África Brasil (1976)	Tropical (1977)

África Brasil is a studio album by Brazilian singer-songwriter and guitarist Jorge Ben. It was released in 1976 by Philips Records. The album was recorded in ten days at Phonogram Studios in Rio de Janeiro with a large ensemble of musicians, including Ben's backing band Admiral Jorge V. During these sessions, Ben adopted the electric guitar in place of the acoustic guitar that had been central to his earlier recordings.

Musically, the album blends MPB, samba-funk, samba-rock and soul with Afro-Brazilian percussion. Its lyrics include references to football, love, childhood and Afro-Brazilian cultural themes. Upon release, África Brasil received critical acclaim, with reviewers noting its blend of genres. Featured in the reference book 1001 Albums You Must Hear Before You Die (2005), the album was ranked 22nd place in Rolling Stone's list of the 50 best albums of all time.

== Background ==
Jorge Ben began his professional recording career with Philips Records in 1963, when the label released his debut album Samba Esquema Novo. The record blended Afro-Brazilian heritage with global African-American music. After the album's success, Philips encouraged Ben to record additional albums in a similar style, leading to the release of three albums within 18 months. The series' musical style was described by Robert Leaver as "a modern, urban take on samba infused with other Afro-Brazilian rhythms", which "made him popular with the youth". After leaving Philips in the mid-1960s, Ben briefly worked as an independent artist. His only album during this period, O Bidú: Silêncio no Brooklin, was released in 1967 by an independent label and had limited commercial impact. The record nevertheless renewed industry interest in Ben, and in 1969 he re-signed with Philips under the leadership of executive André Midani. From 1969 onwards, Ben released a series of albums for Philips throughout the 1970s.

Since the beginning of Ben's professional musical career, when he was already moving away from the bossa nova arrangements that were popular in the Brazilian music scene at the time, Ben incorporated strongly syncopated elements of Afro-Brazilian popular music into his work, blending them with influences from American funk and rhythm and blues. Ben's pre-África Brasil work had long been characterized by riff-driven structures, rhythmic precision, and the use of percussion to create distinctive, danceable grooves. Alongside the strong influence of African-American music on his early albums, his work began to gain more visibility and has been cited by critics as an early influence on what later became known as samba rock—a subgenre defined by the fusion of Black popular music from Brazil and the United States, which scholars have associated closely with Ben's work. After his 1974 album A Tábua de Esmeralda and his live collaboration with Gilberto Gil, Gil e Jorge (1975), Ben set aside the acoustic guitar in favor of the electric guitar.

== Recording and production ==
África Brasil was recorded at Phonogram Studios in Rio de Janeiro over the course of ten days. According to Okayplayer journalist Greg Caz the album reflected musical directions that Jorge Ben had been developing in earlier work, describing it as "something Jorge had been building toward for some time". For the sessions, Ben assembled an expanded group of musicians at Philips' new 16-track studios in Barra da Tijuca, Rio de Janeiro, including his band Admiral Jorge V, originally a four-member group, with fourteen additional instrumentalists and five backing vocalists. During the recording process, Ben decided to replace his acoustic guitar with an electric guitar, influenced by Dadi Carvalho, a former member of Novos Baianos. This change took place after a trip to London, where Carvalho acquired an Ibanez guitar that caught Ben's attention. They eventually swapped instruments: Ben kept Carvalho's guitar, while Carvalho received Ben's Fender Precision Bass.

Carvalho recounted that Ben directed the sessions, with José Roberto Bertrami of Azymuth arranging the orchestral parts and Marco Mazzola contributing backing vocals. Paulinho Tapajós, who produced Ben's previous albums, was replaced by Mazzola, who was also responsible for the mixing. However, during the recording sessions, Philips withdrew producer Marco Mazzola, a decision that Ben opposed. Mazzola stated that no one wanted to take on the challenge of recording an album with two drum kits, two basses, and a large group of additional musicians. Mazzola then traveled to the United States to take a specialized recording course to learn about new recording techniques and how to operate the equipment, asking Ben to wait for his return to Brazil and the arrival of a 16-track mixing console. He ultimately also served as the audio engineer, since the professional originally assigned to the task was unable to handle the new equipment. The album's cover depicts Ben mid-performance; Aldo Luiz handled the design, Orlando Abrunhosa provided the photography, and Jorge Vianna finalized the artwork.

After the recordings were completed, Ben traveled for a concert. Upon returning, he discovered that the album had been finalized without his input. He was dissatisfied with both the mixing and the cover art. Regardless, África Brasil was released in 1976 by Philips Records. Though released under the military dictatorship in Brazil, África Brasil avoided censorship and did not contain explicit political commentary. The title subtly references historical ties, framing Africa and Brazil as interconnected through shared cultural memory. Jorge Ben's indignation in relation to Mazzola's forced withdrawal led him to leave Philips after the release and to sign a contract with Som Livre, where he continued to enjoy commercial success while adopting a more pop-oriented direction. África Brasil was released prior to a period of wider recognition for Jorge Ben at the Som Livre label, which would come with albums such as A Banda do Zé Pretinho (1978).

== Music ==
=== Overview ===
[África Brasil] was a tribute to the African rhythms that arrived here, which took roots in Brazil. All around the Northeast region you see the rhythms: forró, baião, xaxado. Everything comes from Africa. Everything. Totally, totally, totally. American funk itself, American blues, everything... They came to Brazil and were gradually blended, at the time, with those Renaissance melodies of the priests, organs, that church music... How is that ever possible? That mix of African and Renaissance music. These wonderful things. And África Brasil was this tribute that I wanted to pay.

— Jorge Ben in an interview with Kamille Viola

África Brasil comprises eleven tracks and music critics have described it as an MPB, samba-funk, samba-rock and soul recording. Ben shifted from his characteristic acoustic samba-soul or samba-rock style to an electric guitar, adopting an approach that combined core elements of samba with funk-influenced rhythms. Several tracks on the album are re-recorded versions of Ben's earlier compositions, such as "Zumbi" and "O Plebeu", reimagined with a funk-influenced aesthetic.

In the album, Ben connected his electric guitar and, as Caz wrote, "unleashed a hurricane of samba-tinged funk", while featuring a mixture of multiple Brazilian percussion instruments such as atabaques, cuícas, pandeiros and surdos. This percussive setup also included instruments typical of Cuban music, such as congas and tumbas, which stem from the Afro-Cuban tradition and added a more acoustic sound in contrast to the other electrified instruments. The album has also been cited as part of a shift in Jorge Ben's work toward a more pop-oriented approach.

=== Lyrics ===
Thematically, the album address themes such as football, love, medievalism, négritude and childhood. In África Brasil, as in other works, Jorge Ben addressed racial themes in a distinctive and positive way, highlighting Black culture during a time when racism was often overlooked in Brazil. Its lyrics evoke a sense of historical continuity and solidarity between Africa and Brazil, reflecting an increased emphasis on Afro-Brazilian identity. África Brasil is considered the last album of the so-called "mystical trilogy" started with Tábua de Esmeralda (1974) and Solta o Pavão (1975); the three albums incorporate recurring references to alchemical symbolism in their lyrics. The album reflects Ben's role as an observer of everyday life in his lyrics, portraying reality and personal experiences, while his music shows the influence of Afro-Brazilian culture.

The album's opening track "Ponta de Lança Africano (Umbabarauma)" is a salute to an African football player. According to the artist, the inspiration came from a match he watched in France. The track incorporates strong African musical influences, including repeated phrases, chant-like vocal patterns, and onomatopoeias resembling Yoruba phonemes. The track "Hermes Trismegisto Escreveu explores the theme of alchemy by incorporating excerpts from the original text of the Emerald Tablet, a cryptic piece of Hermetica reputed to contain the secret of the prima materia and its transmutation. The song bears similarities with the 1974 track from A Tábua de Esmeralda, "Hermes Trismegisto e Sua Celeste Tábua de Esmeralda", which also set the same text to music. The track "O Filósofo", featured on the album África Brasil, also deals with alchemy. Its lyrics describe a man who "arrived philosophizing in a somewhat angelic tone of voice / Explaining the phenomenon / And the understanding of celestial agriculture". This figure appears to be a reference to the alchemist Paracelsus. In interviews, Ben even refers to Paracelsus as a philosopher and associates him with celestial agriculture.

"Meus Filhos, Meu Tesouro" expresses affection for children and support for their aspirations. It opens with a solo guitar and Jorge Ben's signature phrase "Salve, simpatia!" ('Greetings, kindness!'). In the lyrics, Ben, then married but not yet a father, imagines the future of three fictional children—Arthur Miró, Anabela Gorda, and Jesus Correia—whom he refers to as "trigênios" ('trigeniuses'). "O Plebeu" is a track originally recorded for the 1974 album Sacundin Ben Samba, which features a man expressing confidence that his declaration of love to a princess will be accepted. The track combines a light vocal chorus with synthesizer lines influenced by funk rhythms. "Taj Mahal", first recorded on the 1972 album Ben, is arranged with additional lyrics in a faster version which Eric Sandler of Revive Music describes as "punchier". The lyrics reference to the story of the eponymous mausoleum located in Agra, India. The monument was built by order of emperor Shah Jahan as a testament of love for his favorite wife, Mumtaz Mahal.

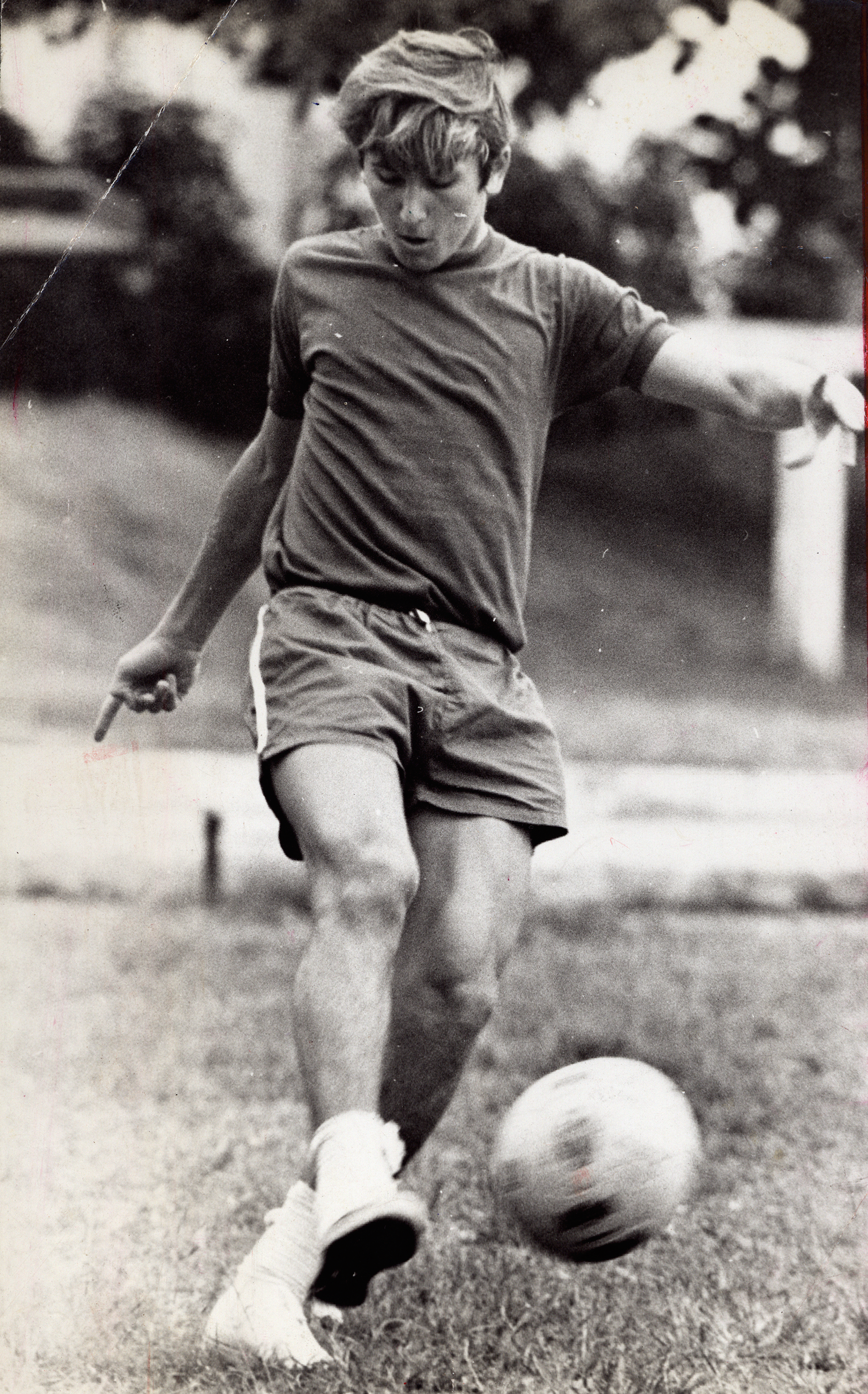
A 1971 photograph of Zico, who is praised in the track "Camisa 10 da Gávea"

"Xica da Silva" is described by Leaver as a "samba-funk hybrid". Broaching a theme of négritude, the song references the historical figure Francisca da Silva de Oliveira, a formerly enslaved Black woman who gained social standing in 18th-century Minas Gerais. Kamille Viola associates the use of atabaques with musical traditions rooted in Brazil's colonial period. "A História de Jorge" is a track that takes the form of a fable, delivered more as spoken word with a refrain than traditional singing. The lyrics include a self-referential element, with the narrator—named Jorge—appearing as a friend who brings a star to a boy in the story, positioning himself as the hero. The composition blends humor with imaginative storytelling to depict an everyday scene with a touch of fantasy. "Camisa 10 da Gávea" reflects Ben's deep passion for football and his favorite team, Flamengo. The song was inspired by a memorable match at Maracanã Stadium on 7 March 1976, when Zico scored four goals against Fluminense. After the game, Ben entered the changing room singing about the player's achievement. In the lyrics, he references Zico's nickname, "Galinho de Quintino", celebrating the athlete's role and blending football with musical expression.

The track "Cavaleiro do Cavalo Imaculado" portrays Saint George as an Africanized figure beyond his traditional syncretism with Ogum, using titles linked to Afro-Brazilian religious symbolism and African identity, alongside medieval imagery. In the lyrics, Jorge Ben attributes titles to the character such as "Lion of the Empire", "Minister of Zambi on Earth" — with Zambi being a deity in Angolan Candomblé — and "Prince of all Africa". "África Brasil (Zumbi)" is a new version of the song originally released as "Zumbi" on A Tábua de Esmeralda. Ben's voice blends with the instrumentation, pushing the song toward rock and away from traditional MPB structures. Lyrically, it invokes the legacy of the Afro-Brazilian resistance leader Zumbi to question Brazil's myth of racial democracy. Ben seems to summon the various peoples brought to Brazil through the Atlantic slave trade: "Angola, Congo, Benguela, Monjolo, Cabinda, Mina, Quiloa, Rebolo". These place names, from where enslaved Africans were taken to Brazil, carried a different meaning during the colonial period—they referred not only to the regions but also to the individuals or their ancestry.

== Reception and legacy ==
Professional ratings
Review scores
Source	Rating
AllMusic	4.5/5 stars
Spectrum Culture	85%
Tom Hull – on the Web	A−

Many critics evaluated África Brasil positively and have considered it one of the best albums by Ben. (Note: Attributed to multiple references:) Philip Jandovský from the database AllMusic gave the album four and a half stars out of five and said that the album is "undoubtedly one of the greatest classics of Brazilian popular music". He praised Ben's mix of a "funky" samba, Afro-Brazilian rhythms, and powerful guitars, calling the result "one of the most fascinating sounds ever recorded in Brazil". Christopher J. Lee, writing for Spectrum Culture, calls África Brasil one of Jorge Ben's best-known and most vital works, describing it as a politically charged, musically exuberant fusion of Brazilian rhythms and African-American funk. Tom Hull wrote that the album has a "dense rhythm, much going on, but flows easily enough, some kind of masterpiece".

Music critic Rodney Taylor described África Brasil as a radical reinvention of Ben's sound, comparing its impact to "Dylan going electric" and noting its lasting influence on Ben's later output. He emphasized the album's deepened funk influence, stating that Ben explores "how far [he] can take his samba-rock-funk synthesis", with the answer being "far indeed". Greg Caz said that the album turned out to be "a universally-revered heavyweight funk masterpiece". Music writer Robert Leaver said that África Brasil is "one of the most compelling recordings to burst forth from the Americas", notable for both its influence and "timeless brilliance". Eliseo Cardona at Spanish-language newspaper El Nuevo Herald called África Brasil Jorge Ben's "masterpiece" and wrote that that Ben "raised the bar of the Tropicália movement" and brought attention to Brazil's African roots, blending "the sensuality of funk" and "the aggressiveness of rock" into "this marvelous album".

Commercially, the album sold approximately 60,000 copies in Brazil. Imported copies of África Brasil were readily available in well-stocked record stores in the United States, and Ben's influence grew considerably. The track "Ponta de Lança Africano (Umbabarauma)" was initially not a hit in Brazil, but garnered popularity when included on David Byrne's 1989 compilation Brazil Classics Beleza Tropical, prompting rotation of a video for the track on VH-1. In 1991, Ambitious Lovers released a cover song on twelve-inch single that became a dance hit. "Xica Da Silva" garnered more attention at the time, both in Brazil and in more alternative circles in the United States, particularly within the disco scene. África Brasil was included in the reference book 1001 Albums You Must Hear Before You Die, published in 2005. África Brasil was elected 22nd in its list of "50 Coolest Records" by the Rolling Stone magazine of the United States, as one of the few non-English-language albums. Conversely, album was voted the 67th best Brazilian album of all time in a list published in October 2007 by the Brazilian Rolling Stone magazine. In May 2022, the album was voted the 42nd greatest Brazilian album by the Discoteca Básica podcast.

In 1978, British rock singer Rod Stewart lifted a melody from "Taj Mahal" for his hit song "Da Ya Think I'm Sexy?". Ben filed a plagiarism copyright infringement lawsuit against Stewart, to which Stewart admitted in his 2012 autobiography to "unconscious plagiarism" of Ben's song, which he had heard while attending the Rio Carnival in 1978. The case was "settled amicably" according to Ben, in Ben's favor. The upshot of which was Stewart's agreement to donate his royalties from the song to the United Nations Children's Fund (UNICEF), performing the song at the Music for UNICEF Concert at the United Nations General Assembly in January 1979. The thematic overview from the album, covering racial topics positively, has also influenced artists like Mano Brown.

== Track listing ==
All songs were written by Jorge Ben.

Side one
No.	Title	Length
1.	"Ponta de Lança Africano (Umbabarauma)"	3:52
2.	"Hermes Trismegisto Escreveu"	3:02
3.	"O Filósofo"	3:27
4.	"Meus Filhos, Meu Tesouro"	3:53
5.	"O Plebeu"	3:07
6.	"Taj Mahal"	3:09

Side two
No.	Title	Length
1.	"Xica da Silva"	4:05
2.	"A História de Jorge"	3:49
3.	"Camisa 10 da Gávea"	4:04
4.	"Cavaleiro do Cavalo Imaculado"	4:46
5.	"África Brasil (Zumbi)"	3:47
Total length:		41:01

== Personnel ==
Credits are adapted from the album's liner notes.

- Jorge Ben – guitar, piano, vocals

Admiral Jorge V

- João Roberto Vandaluz – piano
- Dadi Carvalho – bass
- Gustavo Schroeter – drums
- Joãozinho Pereira – atabaque, congas, timbales, tumba

Additional musicians

- José Roberto Bertrami – keyboards, surdo
- Oberdan Magalhães – saxophone
- José (Bigorna) Carlos – flute, saxophone
- Márcio Montarroyos – trumpet
- Hermes – timbales
- Wilson das Neves – timbales
- Ariovaldo – atabaque, congas, timbales, tumba
- Luna – cuíca
- Neném – percussion
- Canegal – atabaque, congas, tumba
- Doutor – atabaque, congas, tumba
- Djalma Corrêa – atabaque, congas, timbales, tumba
- Evinha – vocals

Production

- Jorge Ben Jor – basic arrangements
- José Roberto Bertrami – orchestral arrangements
- Marco Mazzola – vocal arrangements, production and studio direction, mixing engineer
- Ary Carvalhaes – recording engineer
- Luigi Hoffer – recording engineer
- Paulo Sérgio "Chocô" – recording engineer
- João Moreira – recording engineer
- Rafael Azulay – studio assistant
- Aldo Luiz – cover art
- Jorge Vianna – final art
- Orlando Abrunhosa – photography

== See also ==
- Samba funk
- Culture of Brazil
