= Noites do Norte =

Studio album by Caetano Veloso
- Released: December 2000
- Studios: AR Estúdio, Rio de Janeiro
- Genres: MPB; tropicália
- Length: 50:44
- Languages: Portuguese; Italian (track 6)
- Labels: Mercury, Nonesuch, Universal
- Producers: Caetano Veloso, Jaques Morelenbaum, Moreno Veloso

Caetano Veloso chronology
Livro (1998)	Noites do Norte (2000)	Eu Não Peço Desculpa (2002)

Noites do Norte (lit. 'Nights of the North') is a studio album by Brazilian singer, songwriter, and guitarist Caetano Veloso, released in December 2000 on the record label Mercury. Inspired by writer Joaquim Nabuco, it addresses the theme of slavery in Brazil, incorporating these influences with Veloso's perspective, including a mix of unreleased songs and old hits by the singer, such as "Nosso Estranho Amor", "Tigresa" and "Menino do Rio". In 2001, the album earned Veloso a Latin Grammy Award, winning the Best MPB Album, in addition to nominating for the Best Engineered Album. (Note: The Latin Grammy nominations were shared with Caetano Veloso alongside the producers Jaques Morelenbaum and Moreno Veloso, the engineer Fernando Fishgold and the mixer Marcelo Sabóia.)

== Background ==
Veloso's inspiration for Noites do Norte came from a book given to him by a friend. He was handed Minha Formação (lit. 'My Formation'), the memoir of 19th-century Brazilian abolitionist Joaquim Nabuco. As Veloso read the book, he became deeply engrossed in Nabuco's reflections on slavery and race, which reignited his interest in Brazil's racial history. Subsequently, Veloso proclaims: "I wanted other people to listen to what he had written. Because in fact what we need to talk about in Brazil is a second abolition [of slavery], and he was one of the first people to see this."

== Composition ==
Noites do Norte consists of 12 tracks that address themes such as Brazil's history of slavery and abolition, with the perspective of Veloso, blending various musical styles genres such as samba, rock, Afro-Brazilian rhythms, funk, and hip-hop. The recording consists of original compositions inspired by the book Casa-Grande & Senzala by Gilberto Freyre and other tributes such as Jorge Ben's "Zumbi" and Marisa Monte's "Sou Seu Sabiá". The title song's lyrics are based on the writings of 19th-century abolitionist Joaquim Nabuco, one of whose texts he set to music—a hymn to the African contribution, combining Veloso's original compositions with a focus on African percussion elements from the Brazilian northeast, including timbales, atabaques, and congas, reflecting the cultural influences of Bahia, his home state and a major hub of the country's former slave trade.

The opening track, "Zera a Reza", exemplifies a refined fusion of minimalism and groove, incorporating hip-hop-inspired beats with bossa nova guitar elements. The album's title track, "Noites do Norte", whose lyrics are taken directly from Nabuco's writings, mixes classical and Brazilian folk—including Veloso's tenor—to make a larger, generational statement. "13 De Maio" is a composition based on the day slavery was abolished in Brazil on 13 May 1888. Described as a "tasty seventies samba-funk" track, his son Moreno Veloso helps to produce the composition. "Zumbi" is a tribute of négritude and cover of a song released by Jorge Ben in 1974. "Rock 'n' Raul" is a homage after Brazilian rock singer Raul Seixas, which blends traditional Brazilian rhythms from Veloso and with Seixas' rock influences. "Michelangelo Antonioni" is a symphonic poem written in Italian by Veloso, which also incorporates elements of both Brazilian and Italian musical traditions, being a tribute to the Italian filmmaker Michelangelo Antonioni.

"Cantiga De Boi" is a criticism of the theme of bumba meu boi, making reference to the sacrificial theme, which was formulated in a systematic and inaugural way in Brazilian criticism. "Cobra Coral" sets a poem by Waly Salomão that reflects on themes of transformation and the rhythms of Brazilian life. "Ia" explores the theme of sentimental exiles, characterized by a "nervous and noisy bossa" style. "Meu Rio" is a reminiscence of personal memories about the city of Rio de Janeiro, with the use of instruments such as cavaquinho, tambourine and ganzá. "Sou Seu Sabiá", a song Veloso wrote for Marisa Monte, odes to the comforting presence and healing power of love. In the place of "Sou Seu Sabiá", he almost sang "Você Não Gosta de Mim," which Gal Costa recorded. "Tempestades Solares" is a breakup song of amorous drama, addressed to those who provoked him "with the poisonous mucous membranes of his woman's soul", causing solar storms within his affected heart.

== Critical reception ==
Professional ratings
Review scores
Source	Rating
AllMusic	3/5 stars
Folha de S.Paulo	3/5 stars
Los Angeles Times	3.5/4 stars
Pitchfork	8.1/10

Noites do Norte was met with mostly positive acclaim from various music critics. Chris Nickson gave the album a score of three out of five on AllMusic, noticing the artist's continued boundary-pushing in both lyrics and music. Nickson noted that while Veloso, nearly 60, once drew inspiration from British and American rock, his current focus is inward, exploring Brazilian influences and historical themes. Nickson also praised the album's experimentation with genres, such as the hip-hop drumming on "Zera a Reza" and the psychedelic soundscape of "Ia", showcasing Veloso's refusal to repeat past successes and his commitment to innovation. Pedro Alexandre Sanches, writing for Folha de S.Paulo, rated the album a three out of five stars, describing Noites do Norte as "delicate and, in several passages, insecure", centering on the theme of "temporal exile". Sanches noted that the album's thematic cohesion falters midway, concluding that Veloso's artistry shines in its contradictions but falters when it leans into "dogmas and schematicism".

Don Heckman at Los Angeles Times gave the album three and a half out of four stars and described it as a "stunning new album" inspired by the writings of 19th-century abolitionist Joaquim Nabuco. He praised the "subtle interface of words and music" in tracks such as the title song "Noites do Norte", "13 De Maio", and Jorge Ben's "Zumbi", which explore the complexities of race in the New World. Joe Tangari, reviewing for Pitchfork, rated the album 8.1 and praised its thematic depth and vibrant music, describing it as "a record that absolutely deserves to be heard by all." While acknowledging that Veloso's previous album Livro (1998) might be stronger, he celebrated the album's arrangements, from stripped and warm to rich orchestral tapestries, emphasizing songs like "13 de Maio" and "Zumbi" for their emotional resonance and historical storytelling. Writing for G1, music critic and journalist Mauro Ferreira ranked the track "Rock 'n' Raul" from the album in 69th place on his list of the top 80 "songs that expose the roots and antennae of Caetano Veloso's work".

== Tracks ==
Noites do Norte – Standard edition
No.	Title	Length
1.	"Zera a Reza"	5:08
2.	"Noites do Norte"	2:46
3.	"13 De Maio"	3:36
4.	"Zumbi"	4:56
5.	"Rock 'n' Raul"	5:16
6.	"Michelangelo Antonioni"	3:44
7.	"Cantiga De Boi"	4:47
8.	"Cobra Coral"	4:15
9.	"Ia"	3:52
10.	"Meu Rio"	4:32
11.	"Sou Seu Sabiá"	4:43
12.	"Tempestades Solares"	3:03
Total length:		50:44

== Personnel ==
The process of creating Noites do Norte attributes the following credits:

Musicians

- Caetano Veloso - lead vocals (tracks 1–12), acoustic guitar (tracks 1, 8–12), hand clapping (track 3), chorus (track 4)
- Cleber Sena - percussion (track 1)
- Márcio Victor - drums and percussion (tracks 1–4, 7, 8, 11), horns (track 7)
- Du - drums and percussion (tracks 1–4, 7, 8, 11)
- Jó - drums and percussion (tracks 1–4, 7, 8, 11)
- Paulo Calazans - keyboard (Hammond B3) (track 1)
- Pedro Sá - electric guitar (tracks 1, 5, 9), chorus (track 4), bass (tracks 5, 9)
- Luiz Brasil - guitars (tracks 2, 4, 7, 10, 12), chorus (track 4), talk box (track 7), conductor (track 8)
- Moreno Veloso - conga drum, percussion, electric guitar, hand clapping (track 3); chorus (track 4); cello (track 12)

Production

- Production: Caetano Veloso
- Co-production: Jaques Morelenbaum (tracks 1–4, 6, 8, 9, 11), Moreno Veloso (track 3)
- Artistic direction: Max Pierre
- Artistic management: Ricardo Moreira
- Musical supervisor: Luiz Brasil
- Executive supervisor: Conceição Lopes
- Executive coordinator: Beth Araújo
- Art direction: Luiz Zerbini
- Design: Ludmila Ayres and Zoy Anastassakis
- Photography: Mario Cravo Neto

== Accolades ==
Awards and nominations for Noites do Norte
Organization	Year	Category	Result	Ref.
Latin Grammy Awards	2001	Best MPB Album	Won	
Latin Grammy Awards	2001	Best Engineered Album	Nominated	

== Certifications ==
Certifications for Noites Do Norte
Region	Certification	Certified units/sales
Brazil (Pro-Música Brasil)	Gold	115,000

== Release history ==
Country	Date	Format	Label(s)
Brazil	December 2000	CD	Mercury
Japan	21 February 2001	CD	Mercury
USA	24 April 2001	CD	Nonesuch
