= Jorge Ben (album) =

Studio album by Jorge Ben
- Released: November 1969
- Studios: C.B.D. (Rio de Janeiro); Scatena (São Paulo)
- Genres: Samba rock; Tropicália; psychedelia; soul
- Length: 38:35
- Language: Portuguese
- Label: Philips
- Producer: Manoel Barenbein

Jorge Ben chronology
O Bidú: Silêncio no Brooklin (1967)	Jorge Ben (1969)	Fôrça Bruta (1970)

Jorge Ben is the sixth studio album by Brazilian singer-songwriter and guitarist Jorge Ben. It was released in November 1969 by Philips Records. The album was his first recording for a major label since 1965 when his first stint with Philips ended due to creative differences.

Ben recorded the album alongside producer Manoel Barenbein, the vocal/percussion band Trio Mocotó, and an orchestral section arranged by José Briamonte and Rogério Duprat. It was written by Ben during his previous few years performing independently and developing his unique samba-based style. He incorporated psychedelic and soul music for this lively recording, while his quirky lyrics dealt with everyday life, romances with women, Afro-Brazilian identity, and self-awareness. Guido Alberi's iconic cover for the album also drew on psychedelic influences in its pop-art illustration of Ben and symbols of contemporary Brazilian culture.

Jorge Ben was a commercial comeback for Ben and featured several hit songs, including two of his most famous recordings "Que Pena" and "País Tropical". Critics have since associated the album with Brazil's samba rock and Tropicália musical movements. In 2008, it was released for the first time in the United States by Dusty Groove America. It was rereleased in the US in 2018 by Philips’ sister label Verve Records.

== Background ==
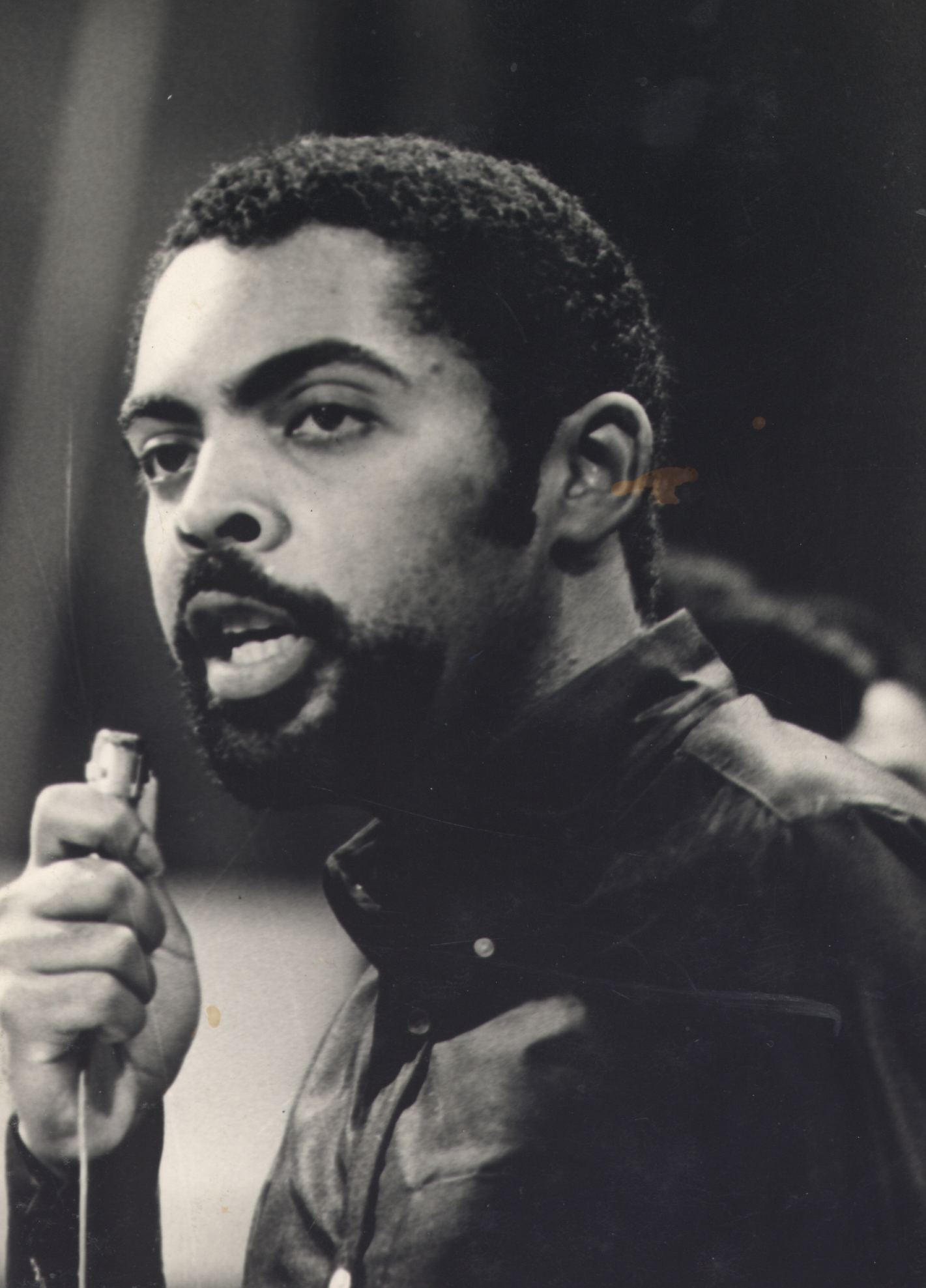
Fellow Tropicália musician Gilberto Gil (pictured in 1960) vouched for Ben to be re-signed by Philips Records.

Jorge Ben began his professional recording career with Philips Records in 1963, when it released his debut album Samba Esquema Novo to immediate fan frenzy. In an effort to capitalize on the success, the label pressured Ben to hastily record follow-up albums of music in the same vein and cover songs as filler. The result was three albums within the span of 18 months and a strain on his relationship with Philips, which ended after the last of these albums (1965's Big Ben) was finished.

For the next few years, Ben performed as an independent artist. His only album during this period, O Bidú: Silêncio no Brooklin, was released in 1967 on the São Paulo-based small-market label Artistas Unidos and sold poorly. While continuing to refine his idiosyncratic samba-based style, he occasionally recorded singles for Artistas Unidos and wrote songs, some of which were recorded by mainstream acts such as Os Mutantes, Wilson Simonal, and Elis Regina. This caught the interest of Philips, which was under the new leadership of former Odeon Records executive André Midani. In early 1969, Midani re-signed Ben after musicians Gilberto Gil and Caetano Veloso promised to promote him whenever possible.

== Recording and production ==
Jorge Ben was recorded at C.B.D. in Rio de Janeiro and Scatena in São Paulo. For the album, Ben chose songs he had been working on since the previous year or two. In the studio, he was accompanied on several performances by Trio Mocotó, a vocal/percussion group he had met while touring São Paulo's nightclub circuit in the late 1960s. Philips Records enlisted pianist José Briamonte to arrange an orchestral section for the majority of the songs, with the arrangements for only "Barbarella" and "Descobri que Eu Sou um Anjo" done by Rogério Duprat. According to Verve Records, the album was produced with sound effects that were state of the art at the time.

== Music ==
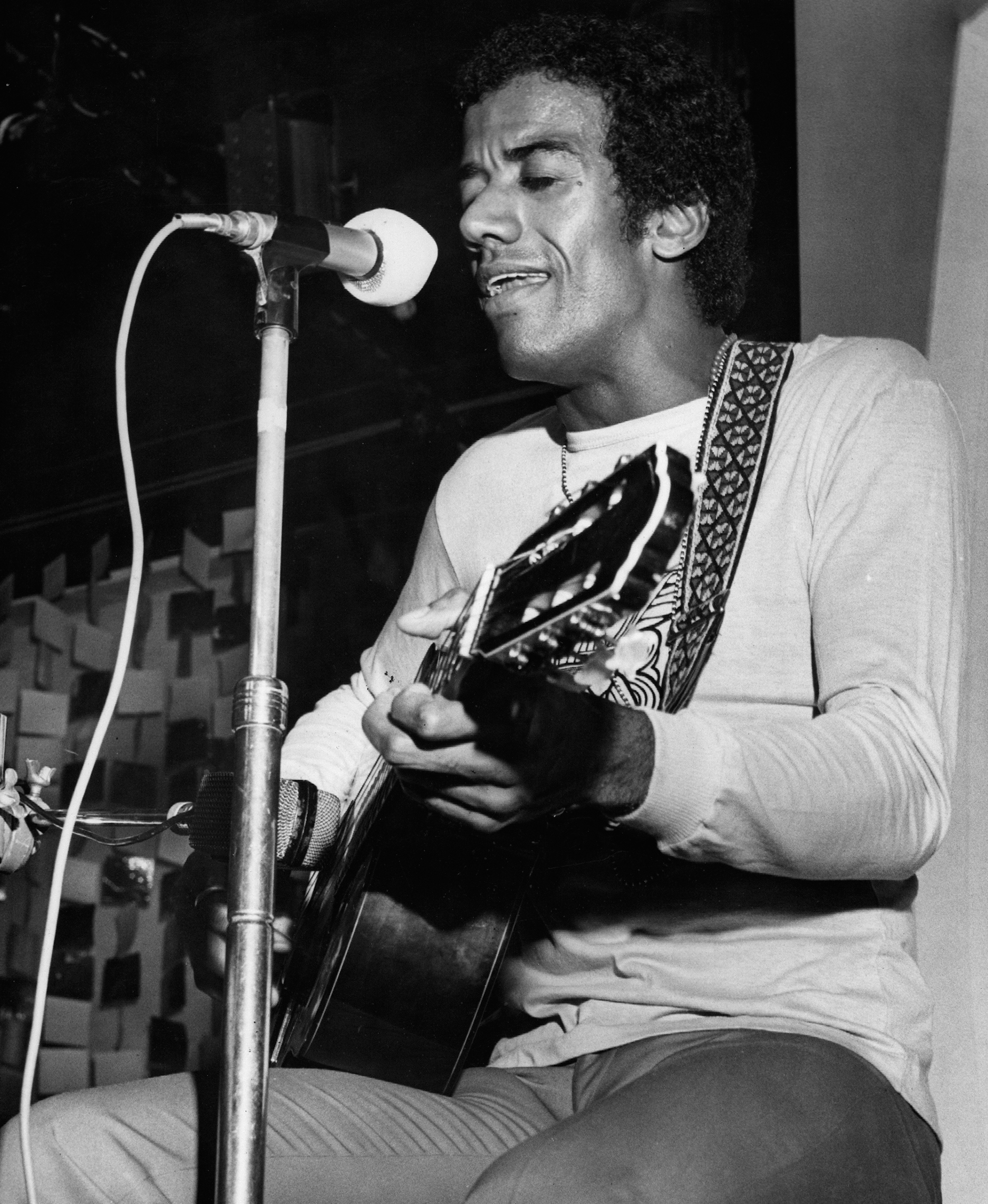
Ben (1972) plays hard-strummed guitar grooves on the album.

The album's music is defined by what Brazilian music aficionado Greg Caz called a "patented hard-strummed 4/4 samba groove" that soon "inspired a whole underground movement known as samba-rock" and characterized Ben's recordings for the next decade. Music critic Rodney Taylor identified the main elements of his lively samba-rock synthesis to be Trio Mocotó's accompaniment and the string arrangements of Briamonte and Duprat, resulting in "the kind of tropical psychedelia" attempted by contemporaries Gil, Veloso, and Os Mutantes. Commenting on individual tracks, he compared "Descobri que Eu Sou um Anjo" to a "hard-rocking outtake" from the 1967 Love album Forever Changes and said that "Take It Easy My Brother Charles" incorporates funk to the overall sound.

According to AllMusic's Thom Jurek, Briamonte and Duprat's arrangements on the album are essential to Ben's fusion of American soul music with the samba and Brazilian folk song structures from his past work. The website's Alvaro Neder adds that this album and Ben's follow-up Fôrça Bruta (1970) represent his involvement in Brazil's Tropicália cultural and musical movement.

=== Lyrics ===
Thematically, the album explores romances with women and everyday Brazilian life, including football fandom. In "País Tropical", he sings, "I live in a tropical country ... I'm Flamengo and I have a nega [Black woman] named Tereza." His lyrics are often characterized by zany reflections, repetition, and nonsense words. As Caz described, "for Jorge, it's not so much about the meaning of the words as it is about their sound. Instead of writing 20 lines, Jorge often preferred to write two that sound very cool and repeat them ten times."

Some songs reflect a burgeoning self-awareness in Ben's songwriting. According to Robert Leaver of Amoeba Music's international records department, the album "asserted Ben's identity with the confidence and exuberance of one who is comfortable in his own skin", particularly in its exploration of Afro-Brazilian perspectives. "Crioula" (English: "Black woman") portrays a black street-market worker who transcends her social status when she performs as a Carnival Queen during Brazilian Carnivals; she is described as "a child of African nobles / who by geographic mistake / was born in Brazil on carnival day." Its final verse quotes text from the back cover of Gil's 1968 self-titled album praising black female beauty: "And as the poet Gil once said / black is the sum of all the colors / you black woman are colorful by nature."

Jorge Ben is strongly informed by African-American soul music's "ethos of racial pride, self-determination, and collective struggle", according to Brazilian culture scholar Christopher Dunn, who cited "Take It Easy My Brother Charles" as a prime example. Ben offers partly English-language words of caution to his "brother of color" in the song, which Caz said expresses a contemporary ethos in an unconventional manner. According to one translation of its Portuguese-language verse, Ben sings:

Ever since the first man marvelously set foot on the moon
I feel more in tune with my rights and principles
And the dignity to free myself
This is why, with no prejudice, I sing
I sing of fantasy, I sing of love
I sing of happiness
I sing of faith
I sing of peace
I sing of suggestions
I sing in the middle of the night
Take it easy, my brother Charlie
’Cause I even sing it to the girl I love
The girl I desire, the girl I await
The girl I adore

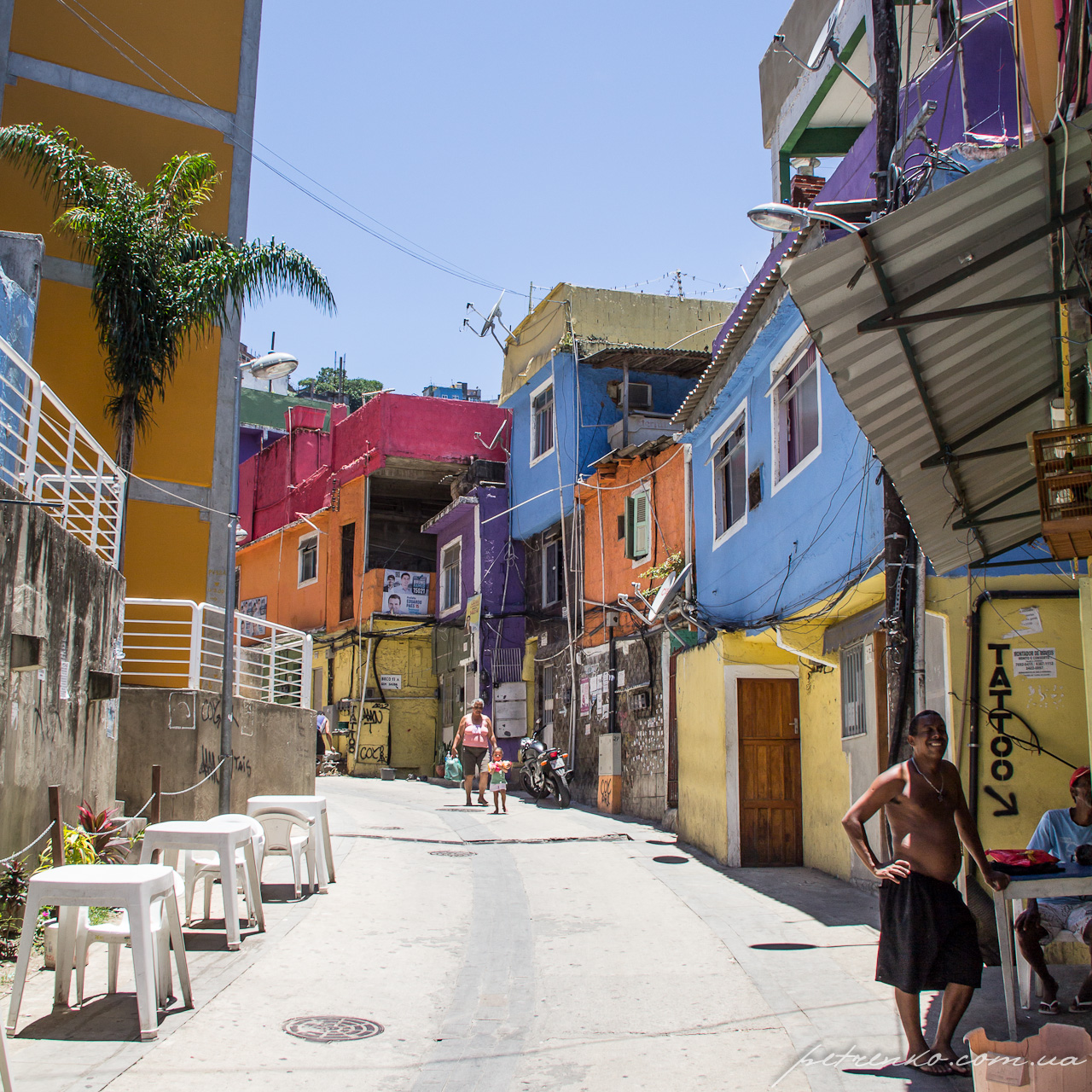
A street in Rocinha. Songs such as "Charles Anjo 45" explore everyday life in Brazil, including the favelas of Rio de Janeiro.

The character of "Charles" is revisited on "Charles Anjo 45", one of several songs on the album that make allusions to the favelas of Brazil's poor non-white population. In the song, he is depicted as an underworld criminal figure from a Rio favela ("Robin Hood of the ghetto"). The narrative follows his melancholic departure for prison and his celebrated return to the neighborhood.

== Packaging ==
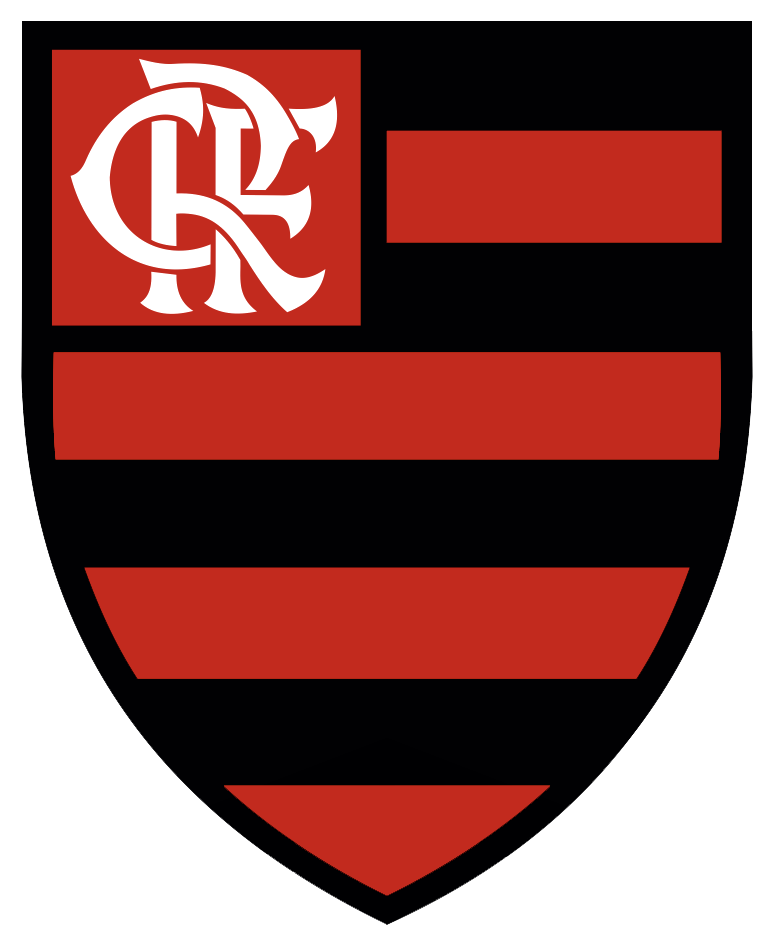
The Flamengo logo affixed to Ben's guitar on the album cover

The album cover was designed by Brazilian artist Guido Alberi. It is a cartoon illustration of Ben surrounded by a psychedelic collage of tropical plants, samba musicians, superhuman women, and the flag of Brazil. Ben is pictured with broken manacles around his wrists, a toucan resting on his bare shoulder, and an acoustic guitar in hand. The guitar is decorated with the logo of Clube de Regatas do Flamengo, Ben's favorite football team. Caz has described Alberi's artwork as "an iconic psychedelic Tropicalia-style cover painting", while art designer Pablo Yglesias said it "remains the favorite cover" for many listeners of música popular brasileira (MPB).

According to Yglesias, either Ben or Alberi had drawn inspiration from Rio de Janeiro's Neorealist art scene (Neorealismo Carioca), which abandoned the high art values of modernism in favor of a focus on ordinary urban life and experimentation with popular, mass-produced mediums such as newspaper photography, graphic design, and comics. As a "magical realist portrait", the cover "mingles the important issues of the day, personal emblems, and symbols of his black Brazilian identity while employing decidedly uptempo pop illustration", he said. "Ben's 'colorless' features contrast remarkably with the day-glo rain-forest world surrounding him, reminding one of the arduous road to self-understanding and realiziation of racial equality." The broken manacles also echo this theme for Yglesias, who said they represent the struggles faced by black people in Brazil and elsewhere in the world.

For the back cover, liner notes expressing approval of Ben were written by Philips producer Armando Pittigliani, who had signed and later dropped Ben during the singer's first stint with the label.

== Release and reception ==
Professional ratings
Review scores
Source	Rating
AllMusic	4.5/5 stars
Tom Hull – on the Web	A−

Jorge Ben was released on LP in November 1969 by Philips Records, and became Ben's commercial comeback. In the months leading up to the album's release, several of its songs had become hit songs for other recording artists, including Wilson Simonal ("País Tropical"), Os Originais do Samba ("Cadê Tereza"), and, as a duo, Caetano Veloso and Gal Costa ("Que Pena"). These songs later became commercial successes for Ben when released as singles from this album. "País Tropical" and "Que Pena" in particular have remained among his most famous songs. According to Leaver, Jorge Ben became Ben's "most significant and commercially successful album to date".

The album was released at the height of the controversial Tropicália movement and sociopolitical turmoil in dictatorial Brazil, whose government was censoring and arresting the movement's more explicitly political artists. Veloso and Gil were jailed temporarily before going into exile in England, while Ben had some of his songs banned from radio play. At a music festival, Ben was heckled for his performance of "Charles Anjo 45", but the song entered the record charts and remained a staple of his repertoire. The album improved Ben's standing in Brazil's music community. As Jurek later wrote:

While he was already an established veteran in Brazilian musical circles, he refused to align himself with either the Jovem Guarda or MPB movements because he found both camps willing to abandon samba in favor of popular styles from North America and England. That ambivalence hurt him professionally but not creatively — until the release of this self-titled classic. When the new tropicalia crew heard the set, they were floored and they attempted to draft the brilliant singer, songwriter, and multi-instrumentalist into their fold.

Jorge Ben was not well received in Veja, however. Reviewing for Brazil's leading news magazine in December 1969, music journalist Tárik de Souza argued that Ben had failed to project himself as a singer, composer, and guitarist. He largely faulted Philips for disregarding the rhythmic appeal of Ben's past success by hiring Bríamonte, whose excessive preoccupation with melody and harmony resulted in orchestrations that suffocate the songs, although Duprat's few arrangements were seen as "magnificent".

The album was reissued on CD in Brazil during the 1990s, but eventually went out of print. In 2008, Dusty Groove America released a remastered CD in the United States. A vinyl edition was issued for the first time in the U.S. in 2018, when Verve and Universal Music Enterprises remastered the album in anticipation of its 50th anniversary.

== Track listing ==
All songs were written by Jorge Ben.

Side one
No.	Title	Length
1.	"Crioula"	3:30
2.	"Domingas"	3:35
3.	"Cadê Teresa?"	3:26
4.	"Barbarella"	3:19
5.	"País Tropical"	4:16

Side two
No.	Title	Length
1.	"Take It Easy My Brother Charles"	2:36
2.	"Descobri que Eu Sou um Anjo"	4:05
3.	"Bebete Vãobora"	2:38
4.	"Quem Foi que Roubou a Sopeira de Porcelana Chinesa que a Vovó Ganhou da Baronesa?"	3:10
5.	"Que Pena"	3:05
6.	"Charles, Anjo 45"	4:55

== Personnel ==
Credits are adapted from the album's liner notes.

Musicians

- Jorge Ben – guitar, vocals
- José Briamonte – arrangements (side one: tracks 1, 2, 3, 5; side two: tracks 1, 3, 4, 5, 6)
- Rogério Duprat – arrangements (side one: track 4; side two: track 2)
- Trio Mocotó – featured performance

Production

- Manoel Barenbein – production
- Stelio Carlini – engineering
- Ary Carvalhaes – engineering
- Didi – engineering
- João Kibelestis – engineering
- Célio Martins – engineering

Packaging

- Alberi – artwork
- Lincoln – layout
- Armando Pittigliani – liner notes
- Johnny Salles – photography

== Charts ==
Chart (1970)	Peak position
Brazil LP's – Rio de Janeiro (Billboard)	3

== See also ==
- Brazilian rock
- Culture of Brazil
- Psychedelic soul
