= Gafieira Universal =

Studio album by Banda Black Rio
- Released: 1978
- Recorded: 1978
- Genre: Samba funk, jazz
- Length: 32:32
- Label: RCA Records, BMG Music
- Producer: Durval Ferreira

Banda Black Rio chronology
Maria Fumaça (1977)	Gafieira Universal (1978)	Saci Pererê (1980)

Gafieira Universal is the second album by Brazilian funk band Banda Black Rio released in 1978 vinyl format by RCA Records (103.0268) and reissued in 1993. Released in 2001 CD format by RCA Records and distributed by BMG Music under catalog number 74321865882.

== Track listing ==
No.	Title	Writer(s)	Length
1.	"Chega Mais (Imaginei Você Dançando)"	Luiz Carlos Batera/Valdecir Nei	2:50
2.	"Vidigal"	Valdecir Nei/Oberdan Magalhães	3:37
3.	"Gafieira Universal"	Barrosinho/Claudio Stevenson	3:06
4.	"Tico-tico no Fubá"	Zequinha de Abreu	3:30
5.	"Ibeijada"	Barrosinho/Claudio Stevenson	3:24
6.	"Rio de Fevereiro"	Oberdan Magalhães/Helio Matheus	3:23
7.	"Dança do Dia"	Jorjão/Barrosinho	3:02
8.	"Samboreando"	Luiz Carlos Batera/Oberdan Magalhães	3:10
9.	"Cravo e Canela"	Milton Nascimento/Ronaldo Bastos	2:20
10.	"Expresso Madureira"	Jorjão/Claudio Stevenson	4:10
Total length:			32:32

== Personnel ==
- Oberdan Pinto Magalhães – tenor saxophone, flute
- Lucio J. da Silva – trombone
- José Carlos Barroso (Barrosinho) – trumpet
- Claudio Stevenson – guitar
- Luiz Carlos "Batera" Santos – drums, percussion, vocals
- Valdecir Nei Machado – bass, cuíca
- Jorge Barreto (Jorjão) – electric piano, clavinet, organ, vocals
- Roberto Tadeu de Sousa (Bebeto) – percussion
- Carlinhos "Pandeiro de Ouro" de Oliveira – pandeiro, cuíca
- Cristina Berio – xylophone
