= Jorge Ben à l'Olympia =

Live album by Jorge Ben
- Released: 1975
- Genre: MPB, samba rock, samba funk
- Label: Philips

Jorge Ben chronology
Solta o Pavão (1975)	Jorge Ben à l'Olympia (1975)	Gil e Jorge (1975)

Jorge Ben à l'Olympia is a 1975 live album by Brazilian artist Jorge Ben recorded at Olympia.

== Track listing ==
All tracks written by Jorge Ben

1. "Bebete vãobora" - 4:15
2. "Zazueira" - 5:25
3. "Por causa de você menina" - 4:38
4. "Taj Mahal" - 6:20
5. "Os alquimistas estão chegando os alquimistas" - 4:20
6. "Fio Maravilha" - 4:12
7. "Luciana [Para ouvir no rádio]" - 6:25
8. "Caramba!" - 7:22
