= Ben É Samba Bom =

Ben é Samba Bom

Studio album by Jorge Ben
- Released: 1964
- Length: 34:34
- Label: Philips
- Producer: Armando Pittigliani

Jorge Ben chronology
Sacundin Ben Samba (1964)	Ben é Samba Bom (1964)	Big Ben (1965)

Big Ben Strikes Again
- 1967 American reissue

Ben É Samba Bom is the third studio album by Brazilian singer-songwriter and guitarist Jorge Ben, first released in Brazil in 1964. It was reissued in the United States by Philips Records in 1967, under the title Big Ben Strikes Again (Catalogue no. PHS 600-234).

== Critical reception ==
Reviewing the album's 1967 American reissue, Sepia magazine wrote that same year: "The expressive voice of Jorge Ben is rough-edged, warm, and very Brazilian. Brazilian music and rhythms have pervaded American and European popular music like a gentle rain and Jorge is one of the reasons behind their influence. You will definitely want this one that has 'Bicho Do Mato,' 'Shuffling Along,' and 'Leaving Port.'" Music critic Rodney Taylor was less receptive in a retrospective review of the original album, saying Ben "loses this balance, and ham-handed horn arrangements overwhelm the weaker songs."

== Track listing ==
All tracks written by Jorge Ben, except where noted.

1. "Descalço no Parque" – 3:04
2. "Onde Anda o Meu Amor" (Orlandivo, Roberto Jorge) – 3:04
3. "Bicho do Mato" – 3:19
4. "Vou de Samba com Você" (João Mello) – 2:44
5. "Samba Legal" (Henrique de Almeida, Claudionor Sant'Anna) – 2:24
6. "Ôba Lá Lá" (João Gilberto) – 2:36
7. "Gabriela" – 2:53
8. "Zópe Zópe" – 2:45
9. "Saída do Porto" (Zil Rosendo) – 3:16
10. "Dandara Hei" – 2:35
11. "Samba Menina" – 3:19
12. "Guerreiro do Rei" – 2:49

=== 1967 American reissue ===
1. "Descalço no Parque (Barefoot in the Park)" – 3:04
2. "Onde Anda Meu Amor (Whither My Love?)" – 3:04
3. "Bicho do Mato (Solitary Fellow)" – 3:19
4. "Vou de Samba com Voce (I'm Going to Do the Samba with You)" – 2:44
5. "Samba Legal (Legitimate Samba)" – 2:24
6. "Gabriela (Gabriela)" – 2:53
7. "Zope Zope (Shuffling Along)" – 2:45
8. "Saida do Porto (Leaving Port)" – 3:16
9. "Dandara Hei" – 2:35
10. "Samba Menina (Girlie Samba)" – 3:19

== Personnel ==
Source: AllMusic

- Jorge Ben – vocals, violão
- Manuel Gusmão – bass
- J.T. Meirelles – flute, saxophone
- Pedro Paulo – trumpet
- Dom Um Romão – drums
