= J. T. Meirelles =

- Born: João Theodoro Meirelles; October 10, 1940; Rio de Janeiro, Rio de Janeiro, Brazil
- Died: June 3, 2008 (aged 67) Rio de Janeiro, Rio de Janeiro, Brazil
- Genres: bossa nova, samba, jazz
- Occupations: musician, composer, arranger, conductor, producer
- Instruments: saxophone, flute
- Years active: 1957–2008

João Theodoro Meirelles (October 10, 1940 – June 3, 2008), better known as J. T. Meirelles, was a Brazilian saxophonist and flautist. He was born in Rio de Janeiro, Brazil and died at 67 years old in that same city. Meirelles is considered one of the creators of the samba-jazz rhythm, along with Manfredo Fest.

== Biography ==
Meirelles was born in 1940 in Rio de Janeiro, Brazil, and started his musical studies at 8 years old and graduated in Berklee School of Music, in Boston, Massachusetts, USA. In 1957, he started his musical career, playing in João Donato's group, while in Rio de Janeiro, and joining the pianist Luís Loy, when he moved to São Paulo.

1963 was one of the most important years in the musician career. When Meirelles moved back to Rio de Janeiro, he created the group Meirelles e Os Copa 5, composed by Manuel Gusmão (bass), Luiz Carlos Vinhas (piano), Dom Um Romão (drums) and Pedro Paulo (trumpet). The group would be considered one of the main bands of samba-jazz and played many times in Beco das Garrafas, where bossa-nova was born. This same year, Meirelles arranged the song "Mas que nada", the first hit of Jorge Ben. The song was very acclaimed and he was invited by Companhia Brasileira dos Discos (actually, Universal Music) for working as one of its musicians.

One year later, in 1964, Meirelles e Os Copa 5 recorded their first album: O Som. This work was positively criticised and considered a mark of samba-jazz. One year later, the group recorded its second album, named O novo som. However, the group has changed; it was composed by Roberto Menescal (acoustic guitar), Waltel Branco (electric guitar), Edison Machado (drums), Eumir Deodato (piano) e Manoel Gusmão (bass).

From 1965 to 2002, Meirelles did not record any other album, but he performed numerous works. From 1964 to 1975, he worked as musician, conductor, arranger and musical producer for Odeon, becoming artistic director for two years. In 1965, he joined Rede Globo Orchestra and the Big Band Jazz and arranged songs for Festival Internacional da Canção, organized by TV Globo. He also participated of Berlin Jazz Festival, in 1966, and the opening show of Canecão, a famous concert hall in Rio de Janeiro, in 1967.

In 1975, Meirelles moved to Europe, where he lived for three years. During this period, he played in many orchestras and bands. He played for four months in Mikonos Jazz Club, as member of Grupo Stress, also composed by Márcio Montarroyos, Laércio de Freitas, Luizão Maia and Pascoal Meirelles.

When he came back to Brazil, he started to teach music for many artist of that country. However, he continued working as arranger and conductor. He contributed for Festival da Canção, organized by TV Tupi, and MPB Shell, organized by TV Globo.

In 2001, Dubas Record reissued Meirelles e Os Copa 5 albums. So, one year later, the group came back and recorded more two albums. Its third album, named Samba Jazz!!, was recorded that same year (2001). It counts with the musicians Guilherme Dias Gomes (trumpet), Adriano Giffoni (bass), Laércio de Feitas (piano) and Robertinho Silva (drums). The fourth album, named Esquema novo, was recorded in 2005 to evoke the historical period of samba-jazz and discuss its reformulations along next years.

Meirelles died in 2008 at 67 years old due to stomach problems. His body was buried the next day, in Catumbi cemetery. Some notable musicians, such as Osmar Milito and Nivalo Ornelas, attended his funeral.

== Discography ==
- 1963: Samba Esquema Novo
- 1964: O Som (Meirelles e Os Copa 5)
- 1965: O Novo Som
- 1969: Tropical with Meireles e Os Copa 7
- 2002: Samba Jazz!!
