= Zumbi (song) =

Song by Jorge Ben

from the album A Tábua de Esmeralda

Jorge Ben singles chronology
"Zumbi"	"10 Anos Depois"

Johann Moritz Rugendas portraits from the 1800s featuring slaves from the locations referred to in the song.

"Zumbi" is a song by Brazilian samba-rock artist Jorge Ben. It appears on his 1974 album, A Tábua de Esmeralda. Its title refers to Brazilian slave settlement leader Zumbi dos Palmares. The song's lyrics describe the scene of a slave auction, ending with hopeful speculation about what will happen when Zumbi arrives. The refrain "Angola, Congo, Benguela, Monjolo, Cabinda, Mina, Quiloa, Rebolla" evokes the African origins of the slaves up for sale in the song. This vocal by Ben accompanied only by percussion is interrupted by a short, rising guitar chord, which announces the climax of the song, with the reintroduction of the sound mass of the brass and the singing taking on more passionate and dramatic contours, alternating with figurative intonations, in the final execution of the chorus, interspersed with apostrophes ("my people!") and some improvised vocals.

The song has also been recorded by Caetano Veloso on the album Noites do Norte.
