= Maria Fumaça =

Studio album by Banda Black Rio
- Released: 1977
- Recorded: 1976
- Genre: Samba funk, jazz
- Length: 29:24
- Label: Atlantic Records, WEA
- Producer: Marco Mazzola

Banda Black Rio chronology
| Maria Fumaça (1977) | Gafieira Universal (1978) |

Maria Fumaça is the debut album by Brazilian funk band Banda Black Rio released in 1977 vinyl format by Atlantic Records (BR 20.022) and issued in 1994 CD format by WEA Music and distributed by Warner Music Brasil (450996349-2). It was listed by Rolling Stone Brazil as one of the 100 best Brazilian albums in history.

The album cover has two overlapping images of the seven members in circle. Photographer Sebastião Barbosa wanted to create a kaleidoscope-like image, but they only managed to take two photos, because as they prepared the second, the camera accidentally fell and hit Barrosinho's face, resulting in a big hematoma in his forehead which was pictured on the cover. The back cover has a picture of the members taken with fisheye lens.

== Track listing ==
| No. | Title | Writer(s) | Length |
|---|---|---|---|
| 1. | "Maria Fumaça" | Oberdan/Luiz Carlos | 2:22 |
| 2. | "Na Baixa do Sapateiro" | Ary Barroso | 3:02 |
| 3. | "Mr. Funky Samba" | Jamil Joanes | 3:36 |
| 4. | "Caminho da Roça" | Oberdan/Barroso | 2:57 |
| 5. | "Metalúrgica" | Claudio Stevenson/Cristovão Bastos | 2:30 |
| 6. | "Baião" | Luiz Gonzaga/Humberto Teixeira | 3:26 |
| 7. | "Casa Forte" | Edu Lobo | 2:22 |
| 8. | "Leblon Via Vaz Lôbo" | Oberdan | 3:02 |
| 9. | "Urubu Malandro" | Louro/João de Barro | 2:28 |
| 10. | "Junia" | Jamil Joanes | 3:39 |
| Total length: | | | 29:24 |

== Personnel ==
- Oberdan Pinto Magalhães – soprano, alto and tenor saxophones
- Lucio J. da Silva – trombone
- José Carlos Barroso (Barrosinho) – trumpet
- Jamil Joanes – bass
- Claudio Stevenson – guitar
- Cristovão Bastos – electric piano and keyboards
- Luiz Carlos "Batera" Santos – drums and percussion

=== Technical personnel ===
- Producer – Marco Mazzola
- Studio Direction – A. Lima F. (Liminha)
- Recording Studios – Level and Hawai
- Recording Technicians – Andy P. Mills and Don Lewis
- Assistants – Brás, Edú, Gordinho, Leão and José Paulo
- Mixing Studio – Westlake Audio
- Mixing Technician – Marco Mazzola
- Master – Kendun Records
- Engineer – Humberto Gatica
- Cutting – Continental
- Cover Art – Gang
- Photography – Sebastião Barbosa
- CD Adaptation – Patricia do Valle Dias
- Music Co-ordination – Don Filó
- Rhythm Session – Nene, Geraldo Sabino, Wilson Canegal and Luna
