= Dom Salvador =

Brazilian pianist

Dom Salvador (born Salvador da Silva Filho in 1938) is a Brazilian pianist most notable for his Rio 65 Trio that featured the Brazilian jazz drummer Edison Machado and bassist Sergio Barrozo. His career spanned a wide variety of genres, but he is best known for his role in the emergence of Brazilian soul music and samba funk.

He also did tours of Europe with musicians like Sylvia Telles. In May 1976, he recorded his one and only American jazz album, My Family, for Muse Records in New York City. Over his long career, he has performed with musicians like Rubens Bassini, Jorge Ben, Elza Soares and Elis Regina, to name a few. In later life he formed the a trio

He currently holds residency in Brooklyn, New York, at the River Cafe, and has done so since 1977.

== Discography ==
=== As leader ===
- Salvador Trio (Mocambo, 1965)
- Rio 65 Trio (Philips, 1965)
- Som, Sangue e Raca (CBS, 1971)
- My Family (Muse, 1976)
- Dom Salvador Trio (Imagem, 1995)
- Tristeza (Whatmusic.com, 2002)
- Transition with Duduka da Fonseca, Rogerio Botter Maio (Lua, 2003)
- The Art of Samba Jazz (Salmarsi, 2010)
- Salvador Trio (Samborium, 2022) Dom Salvador on piano, Giliard Lopes on Bass and Graciliano Zambonin on Drums
- Dom Salvador JID024 (2025)

=== As sideman ===
With Victor Assis Brasil

- Toca Antonio Carlos Jobim (Quartin, 1970)
- Esperanto (Tapecar, 1976)

With Robin Kenyatta

- Nomusa (Muse, 1975)
- Take the Heat Off Me (Jazz Dance, 1979)

With Herbie Mann

- Sunbelt (Atlantic, 1978)
- Mellow (Atlantic, 1981)

With Lloyd McNeill

- Treasures (Baobab, 1976)
- Tori (Baobab, 1978)
- Elegia (Baobab, 1980)

With Dom Um Romao

- Dom Um Romao (Muse, 1974)
- Spirit of the Times (Muse, 1975)
- Hotmosphere (Pablo, 1976)

With others

- Harry Belafonte, Turn the World Around (CBS, 1977)
- Luiz Bonfa, Manhattan Strut (Paddle Wheel, 1997)
- Elizeth Cardoso, Falou e Disse (Copacabana, 1970)
- Paul Horn, Altura Do Sol (Epic, 1976)
- Azar Lawrence, Summer Solstice (Prestige, 1975)
- Edu Lobo, Edu Lobo (Trova, 1973)
- Tim Maia, Tim Maia (Polydor, 1972)
- Ugo Marotta, Baiao Rides Again (Tapecar, 1973)
- Wilson das Neves, Samba Tropi (Elenco, 1970)
- Ivo Perelman, Man of the Forest (GM, 1994)
- Charlie Rouse, Cinnamon Flower (Douglas, 1977)
- Marcos Valle, Garra (Light in the Attic, 2012)
- Martinho da Vila, Batuque Na Cozinha (RCA Victor, 1972)
