= Big Ben (album) =

Studio album by Jorge Ben
- Released: 1965
- Genre: Samba, bossa nova
- Label: Philips
- Producer: Armando Pittigliani

Jorge Ben chronology
Ben É Samba Bom (1964)	Big Ben (1965)	O Bidú: Silêncio no Brooklin (1967)

Big Ben is the fourth album by Brazilian singer-songwriter and guitarist Jorge Ben. It was released in 1965 by Philips Records, his last for the label until Jorge Ben in 1969.

== Background ==
The album was the last in a series of LPs recorded by Ben, under pressure from Philips to reproduce his widely successful 1963 debut Samba Esquema Novo. According to Brazilian music aficionado Greg Caz, "Jorge was hustled into the studio and obliged to crank out lesser versions of his debut classic, padded out with sometimes-questionable covers of tunes by other writers." The liner notes for the album's 2008 reissue describe it as "a careful mix of originals and covers", abandoning the "groovy" and eclectic music of his live performances in favor of "nightclub-style arrangements" catering to samba and bossa nova audiences.

== Release and aftermath ==
Professional ratings
Review scores
Source	Rating
Tom Hull – on the Web	B+

Big Ben was released by Philips in 1965. In the April 3 issue of Billboard that year, it was listed in the "international" category of four-star albums, indicating "new albums with sufficient commercial potential in their respective categories to merit being stocked by most dealers". Meanwhile, Ben's relationship with Philips reached a breaking point and the label terminated his contract, leaving him to work as an independent artist for the next few years. He was eventually re-signed by new management at Philips and released his self-titled sixth album for the label in 1969.

Years later, music critic Rodney Taylor reflected on Big Ben, saying it "sees him experimenting with more straightforward rock rhythms, while continuing the success of the previous album. If he'd stopped recording here, Ben would be a minor artist of note. Instead he became something much bigger."

== Track listing ==
All tracks written by Jorge Ben, except where noted

1. "Na Bahia Tem" (Nestor Nascimento) - 3:15
2. "Patapatapata" - 2:45
3. "Bom Mesmo é Amar" - 3:05
4. "Deixa o Menino Brincar" (Babu) - 2:17
5. "Lalari - Olalá" (Gaya) - 2:53
6. "Jorge Well" - 3:30
7. "O Homem, Que Matou o Homem Que Matou o Homem Mau" - 2:47
8. "Quase Colorida (Veruschka)" - 3:09
9. "Maria Conga" (Hélio da Silva) - 2:07
10. "Acende o Fogo" (Ivan Elias) - 2:07
11. "Telefone de Brotinho" (J.R. Kelly/Max Nunes/M. Scherman) - 2:28
12. "Agora Ninguém Chora Mais" - 3:15
