= Take It Easy My Brother Charles =

Song by Jorge Ben

from the album Jorge Ben
- Language: Portuguese, English
- Released: November 1969
- Genre: Samba rock
- Length: 2:36
- Label: Philips
- Composer: Jorge Ben
- Producer: Manoel Barenbein

"Take It Easy My Brother Charles" is a song composed by Brazilian singer and composer Jorge Ben. Released in November 1969, it is part of the studio album Jorge Ben and an EP.

== Background ==
This song joins two others found on the same album that provide the genealogy of the character "anjo" (angel) in Jorge Ben's discography, "Charles, Anjo 45" and "Descobri que Eu Sou um Anjo". These songs refer to the story of the rebellious sailor Avelino Capitani, who participated in the Guerrilha do Caparaó and was imprisoned. After escaping from Lemos de Brito Penitentiary, he sought refuge on Morro do Livramento. With the persecution of the guerrilla fighter making headlines and becoming a topic of conversation throughout the city, Jorge Ben romanticized his story in these songs, constructing the character of the "anjo," who is a vigilante.

== Other versions ==
A cover of this song is included in the self-titled debut album of the Brazilian band O Rappa, released in 1994.

== Bibliography ==
- Feltran, Gabriel Sanctis (2013-06-30). "Sobre anjos e irmãos: cinquenta anos de expressão política do "crime" numa tradição musical das periferias". Revista do Instituto de Estudos Brasileiros (56): 43. doi:10.11606/issn.2316-901X.v0i56p43-72. ISSN 2316-901X.
- Alexandre, Ricardo (2009). "Nem vem que não tem" (in Brazilian Portuguese). São Paulo, SP: Editora Globo. ISBN 978-85-250-4728-1.
