= A Tábua de Esmeralda =

Studio album by Jorge Ben
- Released: 1974
- Genres: Soul, funk, samba
- Length: 40:06
- Label: Philips
- Producer: Paulinho Tapajós

Jorge Ben chronology
10 Anos Depois (1973)	A Tábua de Esmeralda (1974)	Solta o Pavão (1975)

Singles from A Tábua de Esmeralda
- 1. "Os alquimistas estão chegando os alquimistas" Released: 1974; 2. "Brother" Released: 1974

A Tábua de Esmeralda (Brazilian Portuguese: [a ˈtabu.ɐ dʒ(i) izmeˈɾawdɐ]; The Emerald Tablet) is the 11th studio album by Brazilian singer-songwriter and guitarist Jorge Ben. It was released in 1974 by Philips Records. Regarded as one of the greatest Brazilian records, the album is the last project in which Jorge Ben incorporated extensive acoustic guitar use.

== Themes ==
The album showcases Ben's interest in theosophy, mysticism, and, above all, alchemy. Its title refers to the Emerald Tablet, a cryptic piece of Hermetica reputed to contain the secret of the prima materia and its transmutation; and its artwork incorporates drawings from Nicholas Flamel, who was historically immortalized as a great alchemist for his work on the philosopher's stone.

Mysticism and alchemy are not the only thematic territories into which Ben ventures however. In the style of Fôrça Bruta and África Brasil, Ben continues to explore his Afro-Brazilian identity with songs such as “Zumbi” and “Menina mulher de pele preta”. More simple, anodyne love songs make an appearance here as well with tracks such as “Eu vou torcer” and “Minha teimosia, uma arma pra te conquistar”. Other lyrics reflect Ben's signature fascination with the esoteric; “O homem da gravata florida” describes the details of a man's strikingly beautiful tie, while “O namorado da viúva” is about the lover of a widow. Although tracks such as these stand out as notably singular in their subject matter, “O homem...” is in fact about Paracelsus, while “O namorado...” is yet another reference to Nicholas Flamel.

== Critical reception ==
Professional ratings
Review scores
Source	Rating
AllMusic	4.5/5 stars
MusicHound World	5/5
Music Story	4/5 stars
Tom Hull – on the Web	B+

The record was ranked by Rolling Stone Brazil as the sixth greatest Brazilian album of all time,. Mike Wojciechowski from Tiny Mix Tapes considered it Ben's masterpiece.

== Track listing ==
All tracks written by Jorge Ben, except where noted

1. "Os alquimistas estão chegando os alquimistas" – 3:15
2. "O homem da gravata florida" – 3:05
3. "Errare humanum est" – 4:50
4. "Menina mulher da pele preta" – 2:57
5. "Eu vou torcer" – 3:15
6. "Magnólia" – 3:14
7. "Minha teimosia, uma arma pra te conquistar" – 2:41
8. "Zumbi" – 3:31
9. "Brother" – 2:54
10. "O namorado da viúva" – 2:03
11. "Hermes Trismegisto e sua celeste tábua de esmeralda" (Jorge Ben, Fulcanelli, traditional) – 5:30
12. "Cinco minutos" – 2:57
