= Gil e Jorge =

Studio album by Jorge Ben & Gilberto Gil
- Released: 1975
- Genres: Samba rock, MPB
- Label: Verve
- Producer: Perinho Albuquerque

Jorge Ben chronology
Solta o Pavão (1974)	Gil e Jorge (1975)	África Brasil (1976)

Gilberto Gil chronology
Gilberto Gil ao vivo (1974)	Gil e Jorge (1975)	Refazenda (1975)

Gil e Jorge is a 1975 album featuring collaboration between Brazilian musicians Jorge Ben and Gilberto Gil. The two perform together alongside percussionist Djalma Corrêa on each of the songs, improvising and interacting directly throughout. The album was released in Brazil under the title "Ogum Xangô" (the names of two Yoruba spirits) with a different cover.

== Critical reception ==
Professional ratings
Review scores
Source	Rating
AllMusic	5/5 stars
Tom Hull – on the Web	A−
The Village Voice	A−

Reviewing the album's CD reissue in 1993, Village Voice critic Robert Christgau wrote:

Always ready to go further out on a beat than the other samba/bossa geniuses, they walked into a studio in 1975 and spread nine songs over 78 minutes. With percussion up front and snatches of English on the order of 'Blue, blue sky/Blue, blue sea' reinforcing all the repetitions and nonsense syllables, the renowned lyricists were playing a rhythm game, and they won. They don't just vamp till ready—they vamp to live, vamp for the sheer open-ended joy of it.

AllMusic's John Bush believed it was by far the best album in Gil's discography. In 2007, it was listed by Rolling Stone Brazil as one of the 100 best Brazilian albums in history.

== Track listing ==
1. "Meu Glorioso São Cristóvão" (Ben) – 8:13
2. "Nêga" (Gil) – 10:37
3. "Jurubeba" (Gil) – 11:40
4. "Quem Mandou (Pé na Estrada)" (Ben) – 6:52
5. "Taj Mahal" (Ben) – 14:46
6. "Morre o Burro, Fica o Homem" (Ben) – 6:10
7. "Essa é pra Tocar no Rádio" (Gil) – 6:14
8. "Filhos de Gandhi" (Gil) – 13:11
9. "Sarro" (Ben, Gil) – 1:09

== Personnel ==
- Jorge Ben – vocals, violão
- Gilberto Gil – vocals, violão
- Djalma Corrêa – percussion
- Wagner Dias – bass

== Credits ==
- Art Direction – Jorge Vianna
- Design – Aldo Luiz, Rogério Duarte
- Mastered By – Joaquim Figueira
- Photography – João Castrioto
- Producer [Direction] – Paulinho Tapajós, Perinho Albuquerque
- Technician [Recording] – Ary, João Moreira, Luigi, Luis Claudio
