= Samba Jazz!! =

Studio album by Meirelles e Os Copa 5
- Released: 2002
- Recorded: October 2002
- Genre: Bossa nova, Samba, Jazz
- Length: 53:08
- Label: Dubas Brasil
- Producer: J. T. Meirelles

Meirelles e Os Copa 5 chronology
Novo som (1965)	Samba Jazz!! (2002)	Esquema novo (2005)

Samba Jazz!! is the third album recorded by the group Meirelles e Os Copa 5, led by J. T. Meirelles. Released in 2002, this album celebrates the return of the group, after a long period without recording any song. The album was produced by J. T. Meirelles, who also composed and arranged all its songs.

Despite the long period between the last album, Novo som, and Samba Jazz!!, Meirelles tried to keep the same music conception he had when he was 20 years old. He tried to create simple songs, influenced by jazz, but at the same time which remind Brazilian music. In fact, this album evocates the samba-jazz rhythm exactly as in 1964, when Meirelles e Os Copa 5 recorded their first album, O som.

== Track listing ==
#	Title	Songwriters	Length
1.	"Pinta lá"	J. T. Meirelles	2:58
2.	"Beco do Gusmão"	J. T. Meirelles	3:27
3.	"Senzala"	J. T. Meirelles	7:13
4.	"Copa 5"	J. T. Meirelles	6:59
5.	"Mandinga"	J. T. Meirelles	5:04
6.	"Última página"	J. T. Meirelles	7:15
7.	"Não tem caô"	J. T. Meirelles	4:16
8.	"Sudeste"	J. T. Meirelles	5:26
9.	"Samba jazz"	J. T. Meirelles	5:22
10.	"Lembranças"	J. T. Meirelles	5:02

== Personnel ==
- J. T. Meirelles: alto saxophone, flute
- Guilherme Dias Gomes: flugelhorn
- Laércio de Freitas: piano
- Adriano Griffoni: bass
- Robertinho Silva: drums and percussion
