= Banda Black Rio =

Brazilian musical group

- Origin: Rio de Janeiro, Brazil
- Genres: Samba funk; Soul; Jazz
- Years active: 1976–1984; 1999-present
- Labels: Atlantic; RCA Victor; Universal; Mr Bongo
- Members: William Magalhães; Josué dos Santos; Will Bone; Otávio Nestares; Marquinho Osócio; Sidney Linhares; Cláudio Rosa; Bruno Silveira; Thiago Silva; Mafran do Maracanã; Ricardo Brasil
- Past members: Oberdan Magalhães; Lúcio "Trombone" da Silva; José Carlos "Barrosinho" Barroso; Cláudio Stevenson; Cristóvão Bastos; Jamil Joanes; Luiz Carlos Batera; Jorge "Jorjão" Barreto; Valdecir Nei Machado; Carlos Darcy; Décio Cardoso; Paulinho Braga; José Nilton da Silva; Wanderlei Silva; L.F. Trick

Banda Black Rio is a Brazilian musical group from Rio de Janeiro that was formed in 1976. It has a repertoire based on funk but also including samba, jazz and Brazilian rhythms.

== History ==
Compared to other soul-funk groups, such as Kool & the Gang and Earth, Wind and Fire, Banda Black Rio developed a particular style of instrumental soul music fusing together elements from a number of genres.

WEA had just been established in Brazil, and they wanted to create a band that could be the pioneer of this movement; so they contacted Oberdan Magalhães, a renowned saxophonist, who accepted the challenge together with trumpet player Barrosinho, keyboards and arrangements Cristovão Bastos, guitars and arrangements Claudio Stevenson, bass Jamil Joanes, trombone Lucio Silva and formed Banda Black Rio. Mixing R&B, jazz and samba elements, Banda Black Rio was one of the first to undertake the fusion of Essential Brazilian Music with International Black Music. They were brought together in 1976. Banda Black Rio was often associated with soul-funk bands such as Kool & the Gang, Earth, Wind and Fire, Herbie Hancock, and others.

The band recorded six albums: the instrumental Maria Fumaça (1977), Gafieira Universal (1978) and Saci Pererê (1980). They were also invited to take part in other artists' albums, such as Luiz Melodia, Raul Seixas, Sandra de Sa, Emilio Santiago, Alcione, Carlos Dafe, and recorded a live album with Caetano Veloso entitled Bicho Baile Show and Global Brazilians in 1985. The album was released in 1995.

The present band are the sons of the original members. Two albums came out from this new generation of Black Rio. Rebirth released in the 2001 and Supernova samba funk in 2012.

== Discography ==
- 1977 - Maria Fumaça
- 1977 - O Dia em que a Terra Parou by Raul Seixas
- 1978 - Bicho Baile Show by Caetano Veloso
- 1978 - Tim Maia Disco Club by Tim Maia
- 1978 - Gafieira Universal
- 1980 - Saci Pererê
- 1995 - Global Brazilians
- 1998 - 12 Inch Jazz Funk Classics
- 2000 - Rebirth/Movimento
- 2011 - Supernova Samba Funk
- 2019 - O Som das Américas
