= País Tropical =

1969 Brazilian song by Jorge Ben Jor

"País Tropical" ("Tropical Country") is a Brazilian song composed by singer and composer Jorge Ben Jor. The song was originally recorded by singer Wilson Simonal on 22 July 1969. It was released the following month, and became the biggest hit of the singer's career. In December of that year two more versions of the song were released: One by Gal Costa (on her 1969 album Gal), and one by composer Jorge Ben Jor (on his self-titled album Jorge Ben).

Over the years, the song came to be more and more associated with its author, Jorge Ben Jor, overshadowing the success of Simonal's original recording. The song has also been adapted by many composers and singers, including Sergio Mendes, Maurício Manieri, Ivete Sangalo, Shakira and Claudia Leitte. It was also re-recorded by Jorge Ben Jor himself, on his 1977 album Tropical.

In addition, a Hebrew rendition of the song titled Eretz Tropit Yafa (אֶרֶץ טְרוֹפִּית יָפָה, ‘A Beautiful Tropical Country’), performed by Yehudit Ravitz, was included in a project by the same title featuring Hebrew adaptations of Brazilian songs (produced by Matti Caspi, written by Ehud Manor, and arranged by Ahrale Kaminsky), and proved to be an enduring success.

== Wilson Simonal's version ==
In July 1969, Jorge Ben took Wilson Simonal, his friend, to a Gal Costa concert, with whom the former was having an affair. In that concert, Gal sang "País Tropical". Simonal loved the song, and learned from Ben that the song was to be recorded by Costa. Simonal booked a studio and, on July 22, 1969, took Jorge Ben there, where his band (Sound Three formed by César Camargo Mariano on the piano, Toninho on drums and Sabá on bass, plus Chacal on percussion) was already waiting for him.

Upon arriving, the singer made Jorge Ben show the song to Camargo. Simonal and Camargo came up with an arrangement that removed entire stanzas and included an encore in which only the first syllables of the words were pronounced. Thus, "Moro num país tropical" became "Mó- num pa- tropi-". Camargo also put a coda in which he appropriated the lyrics of "Eu Sou Flamengo" by Pedro Caetano, which had been recorded by Jorge Veiga in 1954. This eventually led to a lawsuit in which the author gained rights over this version of the song.

Released in August 1969, the song quickly became a huge success. It coincided with the nationalistic spirit of ufanismo used by the military regime in its propaganda. This would reinforce Simonal's later reputation as an informer; the same did not happen with Jorge Ben.

== Jorge Ben's recordings ==
Composed by Jorge Ben, the song was released as part of his self-titled album Jorge Ben (1969), one of his most successful albums. Over the years, the song became the biggest success of Jorge Ben's career. In 1977, Ben re-recorded the song for his studio album, Tropical.
