= José Gusmão =

Portuguese politician

José Gusmão MEP
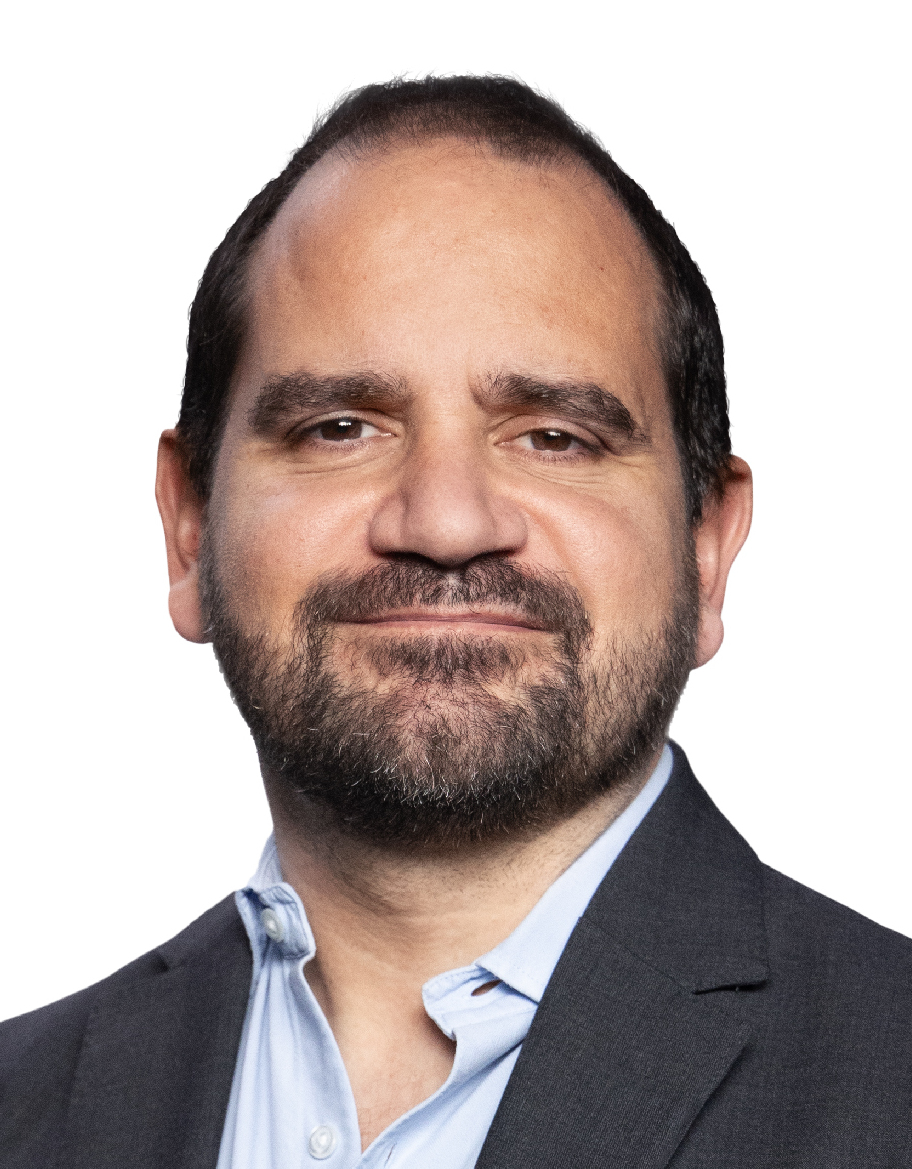
- Gusmão in 2024

Member of the European Parliament for Portugal
- In office 2 July 2019 – 15 July 2024

Member of the Assembly of the Republic
- In office 15 October 2009 – 19 June 2011
- Constituency: Santarém

Personal details
- Born: José Guilherme Figueiredo Nobre de Gusmão; 20 July 1976 (age 50) Lisbon, Portugal
- Party: Left Bloc
- Other political affiliations: Portuguese Communist Party (formerly)
- Parent: Manuel Gusmão (father)
- Education: University of Lisbon
- Occupation: Economist • Politician
- Website: EU Personal Profile

José Guilherme Figueiredo Nobre de Gusmão (born 20 July 1976) is a Portuguese politician formerly serving as a Member of the European Parliament for the Left Bloc from 2019 until 2024.

== Biography ==
Gusmão was born in 1976. He is the son of writer and politician Manuel Gusmão and the half-brother of politician commentator Daniel Oliveira (they both share the same mother).

A member of the Left Bloc, he was first elected as a deputy from Santarém in 2009. He ran for re-election in 2011, but failed.

In 2019, he was elected as a MEP along with Marisa Matias.

In 2022, he was the main candidate of the Left Bloc in Faro, but he failed to be elected. He was once again chosen as the main candidate in Faro for the 2024 election.
