= Samba-jazz =

Brazilian music genre

- Stylistic origins: Samba; Jazz
- Cultural origins: Late 1950s in Rio de Janeiro, Brazil
- Typical instruments: Piano; double bass; drums; electric piano; organ; trumpet; saxophone

Samba-jazz or jazz samba is an instrumental subgenre of samba that emerged in the bossa nova ambit in the late 1950s and early 1960s in Brazil.

The style consolidated the approach of Brazilian samba with American jazz, especially bebop and hard bop, jazzy styles quite experienced by Brazilian musicians in scope of gafieiras and nightclubs especially in Rio de Janeiro. Having its initial formation based on the piano, the double bass and the drums, samba-jazz gradually absorbed broader musical instruments.

Unlike bossa nova, which is a style of samba characterized by its intimate spirit, soft sound and the restraint of sound elements, samba-jazz has many elements present in improvising and stridency. Nevertheless as bossa nova became well known, samba-jazz itself was favored by the bossa-novista repertoire, and a whole generation of instrumentalists influenced by American jazz, such as Sérgio Mendes, J.T. Meirelles, Edison Machado, Dom Um Romão, Zimbo Trio, Tamba Trio, Milton Banana Trio, Jongo Trio, among others, became involved with the style led by João Gilberto.

== Sources ==
- Lopes, Nei; Simas, Luiz Antonio (2015). Dicionário da História Social do Samba (in Brazilian Portuguese) (2ª ed.). Rio de Janeiro: Civilização Brasileira.
- Silva, Rafael Mariano Camilo da (2017). Desafinado: dissonâncias nos discursos acerca da influência do Jazz na Bossa Nova (PDF) (Master) (in Brazilian Portuguese). Uberlândia: Federal University of Uberlândia.
- Barsalini, Lorenzo (2014). "A Turma da Gafieira: os conflitos entre a tradição e a modernidade nos precursores do samba jazz". ANAIS do XXIV Congresso da ANPPOM (in Brazilian Portuguese). 1. São Paulo: XXIV Congresso da ANPPOM.
