= Sacundin Ben Samba =

Studio album by Jorge Ben
- Released: 1964
- Genre: Samba
- Label: Philips
- Producer: Armando Pittigliani

Jorge Ben chronology
Samba Esquema Novo (1963)	Sacundin Ben Samba (1964)	Ben É Samba Bom (1964)

Sacundin Ben Samba is the second album by Brazilian singer-songwriter and guitarist Jorge Ben, released in 1964.

== Music and lyrics ==
The album is stylistically very similar to Ben's debut Samba Esquema Novo, although the rhetoric of protest music, inspired by the likes of João de Vale and Zé Keti and found in such songs as "Não desanima João", "Jeitão de preto velho", and "A princesa e o plebeu" sets it apart from its predecessors.

== Critical reception ==
Professional ratings
Review scores
Source	Rating
Tom Hull – on the Web	B+

Along with Ben's first and third records, Sacundin Ben Samba was described by Will Hermes as the "blueprint for much of modern Brazilian pop." Music critic Rodney Taylor, who was critical of the previous album, said Ben "rights himself ... with the bigger band arrangements fleshing out his sound rather than drowning it."

== Track listing ==
All tracks written by Jorge Ben, except where noted

1. "Anjo Azul" – 2:48
2. "Nena Nana" – 2:52
3. "Vamos Embora "Uau"" – 2:32
4. "Capoeira" – 2:48
5. "Gimbo" – 2:35
6. "Carnaval Triste" (Paulo Bruce, Sérgio C. de Almeida) – 2:33
7. "A Princesa e o Plebeu" – 3:25
8. "Menina do Vestido Coral" – 3:31
9. "Pula Baú" – 2:28
10. "Jeitão de Preto Velho" – 3:04
11. "Espero por Você" (João Mello) – 2:04
12. "Não Desanima João" – 3:14

== Personnel ==
- Jorge Ben – vocals, violão
- Luís Carlos Vinhas – piano, arrangements
- Manuel Gusmão – bass
- Pedro Paulo – trumpet
- Dom Um Romão – drums
