= Ben (Jorge Ben album) =

Studio album by Jorge Ben
- Released: 1972
- Genres: Samba rock, samba
- Length: 36:40
- Language: Brazilian Portuguese
- Label: Philips
- Producer: Paulinho Tapajós

Jorge Ben chronology
Negro É Lindo (1971)	Ben (1972)	10 Anos Depois (1973)

Ben is the ninth album by Brazilian artist Jorge Ben, released in 1972. The album has one of Jorge Ben's most famous songs, "Taj Mahal from India", and "Fio Maravilha", paying homage to Flamengo's iconic striker Fio Maravilha.

== "Taj Mahal" and Rod Stewart ==
Ben filed a copyright infringement lawsuit claiming Rod Stewart's 1978 song "Da Ya Think I'm Sexy?" had been derived from "Taj Mahal". The case was "settled amicably" according to Ben. Stewart admits "unconscious plagiarism" of Ben's tune in his 2012 autobiography.

== Track listing ==
All songs composed by Jorge Ben.

No.	Title	English translation	Length
1.	"Morre o Burro Fica o Homem"	The Donkey Dies, the Man Remains	2:06
2.	"O Circo Chegou"	The Circus Has Arrived	2:44
3.	"Paz e Arroz"	Peace and Rice	2:03
4.	"Moça"	Girl	4:58
5.	"Domingo 23"	Sunday 23rd	3:48
6.	"Fio Maravilha"	Fio Maravilha	2:13
7.	"Quem Cochicha o Rabo Espicha"	Whoever Gossips Gets their Tail Stretched	3:27
8.	"Caramba!... Galileu da Galileia"	Wow!... Galileo of Galilee	2:28
9.	"Que Nega É Essa"	What a [Black] Girl	3:32
10.	"As Rosas Eram todas Amarelas"	The Roses Were All Yellow	3:52
11.	"Taj Mahal"	Taj Mahal	5:29
