= 10 Anos Depois =

Studio album by Jorge Ben
- Released: 1973
- Genre: Samba rock, samba
- Length: 41:33
- Label: Philips
- Producer: Paulinho Tapajós

Jorge Ben chronology
Ben (1972)	10 Anos Depois (1973)	A Tábua de Esmeralda (1974)

10 Anos Depois is the tenth album by Brazilian musical artist Jorge Ben, released in 1973. It is a collection of popular songs from the first decade of his career re-recorded as medleys.

== Track listing ==
All songs composed by Jorge Ben.

No.	Title	Length
1.	"Por Causa de Você, Menina / Chove Chuva / Mas que Nada"	4:13
2.	"Agora, Ninguém Chora Mais / Charles Anjo 45 / Caramba... Galileu da Galileia"	5:23
3.	"A Minha Menina / Que Maravilha / Zazueira"	6:03
4.	"Bebete Vãobora / Crioula / Cadê Teresa"	4:51
5.	"País Tropical / Fio Maravilha / Taj Mahal"	5:57
6.	"Vendedor de Bananas / Cosa Nostra / Bicho do Mato"	6:63
7.	"Que Nega É Essa / Que Pena / Domingas"	7:38
8.	"Vinheta"	0:25
Total length:		41:33
