= Helio Matheus =

Brazilian singer, composer (1940–2017)

- Born: July 5, 1940; Rio de Janeiro, Brazil
- Died: February 9, 2017 (aged 76) Rio de Janeiro
- Genres: MPB; soul; funk; sambalanço
- Instruments: Vocals; guitar
- Labels: RCA Victor; Som Livre

Helio Matheus (July 5, 1940 – February 9, 2017) was a Brazilian singer and composer.

Matheus started his music career playing in nightclubs in Rio de Janeiro and São Paulo, first recording a single in 1968. His first successful composition was "Comunicação", which was performed by Vanusa in the 1969 Festival Internacional da Canção and also recorded in 1970 by Elis Regina for her album Em Pleno Verão. In 1975, he recorded his first LP Matheus Segundo Matheus. The record featured musicians like Oberdan Magalhães, Zé Rodrix, Chiquinho de Moraes, and the band Azymuth. After the release of the EP Boi Da Cara Branca in 1977, two songs off the record, "Boi da Cara Branca" and "O Poeta e a Lua," were featured in the soundtracks of Rede Globo telenovelas, O Astro and À Sombra dos Laranjais respectively. In the 1980s, Matheus moved to São Paulo, where he worked at the Sociedade Independente de Compositores e Autores Musicais (SICAM, "Independent Society of Musical Composers and Authors"). He continued to compose for singers like Sérgio Reis, Dominguinhos, Gilliard, Franco Scornavacca, and Jair Rodrigues.

Throughout his career, Matheus composed more than 150 songs; "Mais Kriola", recorded by Wanderléa in 1973, "Camisa 10" in 1973 (in collaboration with guitarist Luis Vagner), "Alma Nua", recorded by Gilliard in 1988, "Garimpeiro Real," recorded by Dominguinhos in 1994, among others.

In his final years, Matheus suffered from alcoholism, spending most of this time living out of hostels. He later returned Rio de Janeiro and resided in the Retiro dos Artistas until his death from pneumonia, in 2017.

== Discography ==
Albums

- Matheus segundo Matheus (1975)
- Renascer (1996)

EPs

- Boi da Cara Branca (1977)

Singles

- "Elefantinho de Marfim / Caixinha de Mísica" (1968)
- "João Amem / Yemanjá" (1971)
- "Eu, Réu, Me Condeno / Feijão com Farinha" (1973)
- "Catedral / Livramento" (1974)
- "Boi da Cara Branca / A Gota" (1978)

== See also ==
- Helio Matheus (Portuguese Wikipedia)
