= Djalma Corrêa =

Brazilian percussionist and composer (1940–2022)

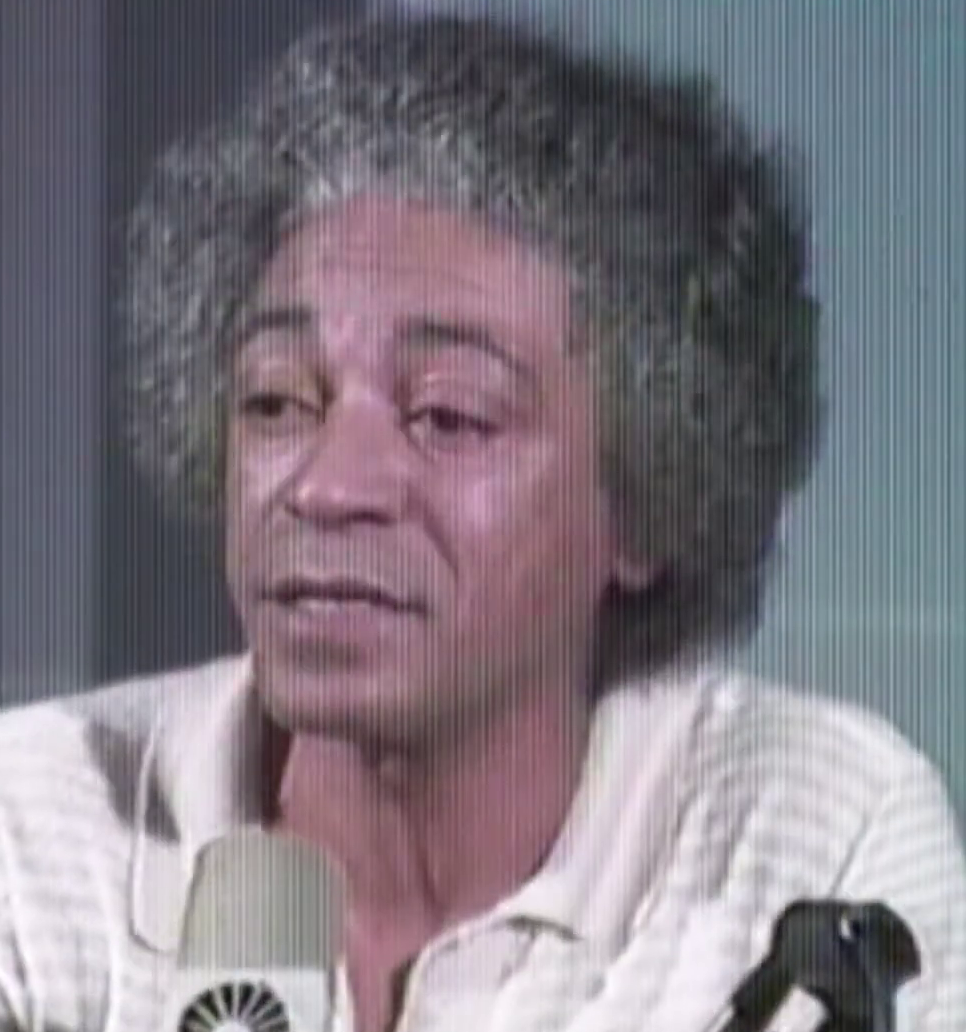
- Corrêa in 1986
- Born: Djalma Novaes Corrêa; 18 November 1942; Ouro Preto, Minas Gerais, Brazil
- Died: 8 December 2022 (aged 80); Rio de Janeiro, Brazil
- Occupation: Percussionist

Djalma Novaes Corrêa (18 November 1942 – 8 December 2022) was a Brazilian percussionist and composer.

== Life and career ==
Born in Ouro Preto, the son of a flautist, Corrêa spent his adolescence in Belo Horizonte, and he studied composition and percussion at the Seminarios de Musica of the Federal University of Bahia.

Corrêa started his professional career in a symphonic orchestra. In 1970 he founded the jazz fusion percussion ensemble Baiafro, which he eventually left in 1976. His collaborations include Gilberto Gil, Chico Buarque, Caetano Veloso, Jorge Ben, Maria Bethânia, Gal Costa, Peter Gabriel, Volker Kriegel, Dave Pike. He was part of the supergroup "Quarteto Negro" with Zezé Motta, Paulo Moura and Jorge Degas. During his career he also composed songs, film scores and incidental music.

Corrêa died of pancreatic cancer on 8 December 2022, at the age of 80.
