= Fio Maravilha =

Brazilian footballer and manager (born 1945)

Personal information
- Full name: João Batista de Sales
- Date of birth: 19 January 1945 (age 81)
- Place of birth: Conselheiro Pena, Brazil
- Position: Forward

Youth career
- 1960–1965: Flamengo

Senior career*
Years	Team	Apps	(Gls)
1965–1973	Flamengo	87	(27)
1973	→ Paysandu (loan)		
1973	→ Desportiva (loan)	14	(0)
1975	São Cristóvão	16	(0)
1975	CEUB	15	(3)
1977	São Cristóvão	18	(2)
1978	New York Eagles		
1978	Montebello Panthers		
1979	San Francisco Mercury		

Managerial career
- 1977–1978: São Cristóvão
- * Club domestic league appearances and goals

João Batista de Sales (born January 19, 1945, in Conselheiro Pena, Minas Gerais), better known as Fio Maravilha, is a former Brazilian football player. In Brazil he played for Flamengo, Paysandu Sport Club, CEUB, Desportiva and São Cristóvão. Later he moved to the United States, where he played for the New York Eagles, the Montebello Panthers, and the San Francisco Mercury.

== Biography ==
He is perhaps most famous for the hit single "Fio Maravilha" that was written about him in 1972 by Jorge Ben (later known as Jorge Ben Jor). The musician attended a friendly game between Flamengo and Benfica at Maracanã. Fio was left out of Flamengo's starting lineup by coach Mário Zagallo, but after a chorus of fans demanded that he play, he was brought in as a substitute. After 33 minutes in the second half he scored the goal ("the goal of an angel") that was immortalized in the song:

...driblou o goleiro
Só não entrou com bola e tudo porque teve humildade.
("...he dribbled past the goalkeeper but did not enter the goal with the ball because he was humble.")

As the result of a legal dispute between Jorge Ben and Fio, the title of the song was later changed to Filho Maravilha. In 2007, Fio gave to the musician the permission to use his name Fio in the song.

Fio Maravilha lives in San Francisco, where he worked as a pizza deliverer. He now coaches youth soccer.
