= O Bidú: Silêncio no Brooklin =

Studio album by Jorge Ben
- Released: 1967
- Genres: Samba rock; Jovem Guarda
- Length: 31:13
- Label: Artistas Unidos

Jorge Ben chronology
Big Ben (1965)	O Bidú: Silêncio no Brooklin (1967)	Jorge Ben (1969)

O Bidú: Silêncio no Brooklin is the fifth studio album by Brazilian singer-songwriter and guitarist Jorge Ben. It was recorded with Brazilian rock band The Fevers as Ben's backing musicians and released in 1967 by Artistas Unidos, a small-market record label based in São Paulo.

== Recording ==
The album was recorded while Ben was living in Brooklin, a neighborhood of São Paulo with Erasmo Carlos. Its title is a reference to a car that Ben owned at the time and the subtitle is a joke on a neighbor who would scream "Silence in Brooklin!" when Ben stopped his constant and loud rehearsals. For the album, Ben was backed by Brazilian rock band The Fevers.

== Musical style ==
The album marks a change from Ben's previous recording because of the constant presence of the electric guitar and its closeness to the sound of the Jovem Guarda musical movement. The musician Caetano Veloso cites the recording as one of the main influences for Tropicália, another movement of 1960s Brazilian music. According to AllMusic's Philip Jandovský, O Bidú is characteristic of Ben's 1960s recordings in that it is "full of sweet, sincere, and mainly upbeat songs, with the music mixing samba with elements of bossa nova, swing, pop, and soul". Music critic Rodney Taylor calls it the singer's "first real attempt to merge rock and samba", with the rhythm section still swinging more than rocking.

== Critical reception ==
Retrospective professional reviews
Review scores
Source	Rating
AllMusic	4.5/5 stars
Tom Hull – on the Web	B+

According to Tom Hull, O Bidú is "regarded as [Ben's] samba-rock fusion breakthrough". In Taylor's opinion, the album found the musician writing and playing "tougher" than his sidemen in the Fevers, whose pianist in particular sounded undisciplined. Overall, however, the critic said the more aggressive songwriting and musicianship "barrel through the weaknesses and presage the greatness to come." Jandovský, in his AllMusic review, found the record "highly enjoyable" and faulted only the short running time, while highlighting "Toda Colorida", "Frases" ("with its soft groove and neat lyrics"), and "Amor de Carnaval", which he called one of Ben's best compositions.

== Track listing ==
All songs written by Jorge Ben except where noted.

1. "Amor de Carnaval" – 2:23
2. "Nascimento de um Príncipe Africano" – 3:55
3. "Jovem Samba" – 1:49
4. "Rosa mas que nada" – 2:31
5. "Canção de uma fan" – 2:11
6. "Menina Gata Augusta" (Jorge Ben, Erasmo Carlos) – 2:59
7. "Toda Colorida" – 3:18
8. "Frases" – 2:50
9. "Quanto mais te vejo" (Jorge Ben, Yara Rossi) – 1:54
10. "Vou andando" – 2:25
11. "Sou da Pesada" – 2:03
12. "Si manda" – 2:55
