= Solta o Pavão =

Studio album by Jorge Ben
- Released: 1975
- Genre: MPB, samba rock, samba funk
- Label: Philips

Jorge Ben chronology
| A Tábua de Esmeralda (1974) | Solta o Pavão (1975) | Gil e Jorge (1975) |

Professional ratings
Review scores
| Source | Rating |
|---|---|
| Tom Hull – on the Web | A− |

Solta o Pavão is a 1975 album by Brazilian artist Jorge Ben. The title of the album literally means "unleash the peacock" and refers to the outward expression of inner beauty.

== Track listing ==
All tracks written by Jorge Ben

1. "Zagueiro" – 3:03
2. "Assim Falou Santo Tomás de Aquino" – 2:56
3. "Velhos, Flores, Criancinhas e Cachorros" – 3:18
4. "Dorothy" – 3:57
5. "Cuidado com o Bulldog" – 2:57
6. "Para Ouvir no Rádio (Luciana)" – 4:20
7. "O Rei Chegou, Viva o Rei" – 3:04
8. "Jorge de Capadócia" – 3:53
9. "Se Segura Malandro" – 2:56
10. "Dumingaz" – 3:31
11. "Luz Polarizada" – 2:23
12. "Jesualda" – 2:44
