= Wilson Simonal =

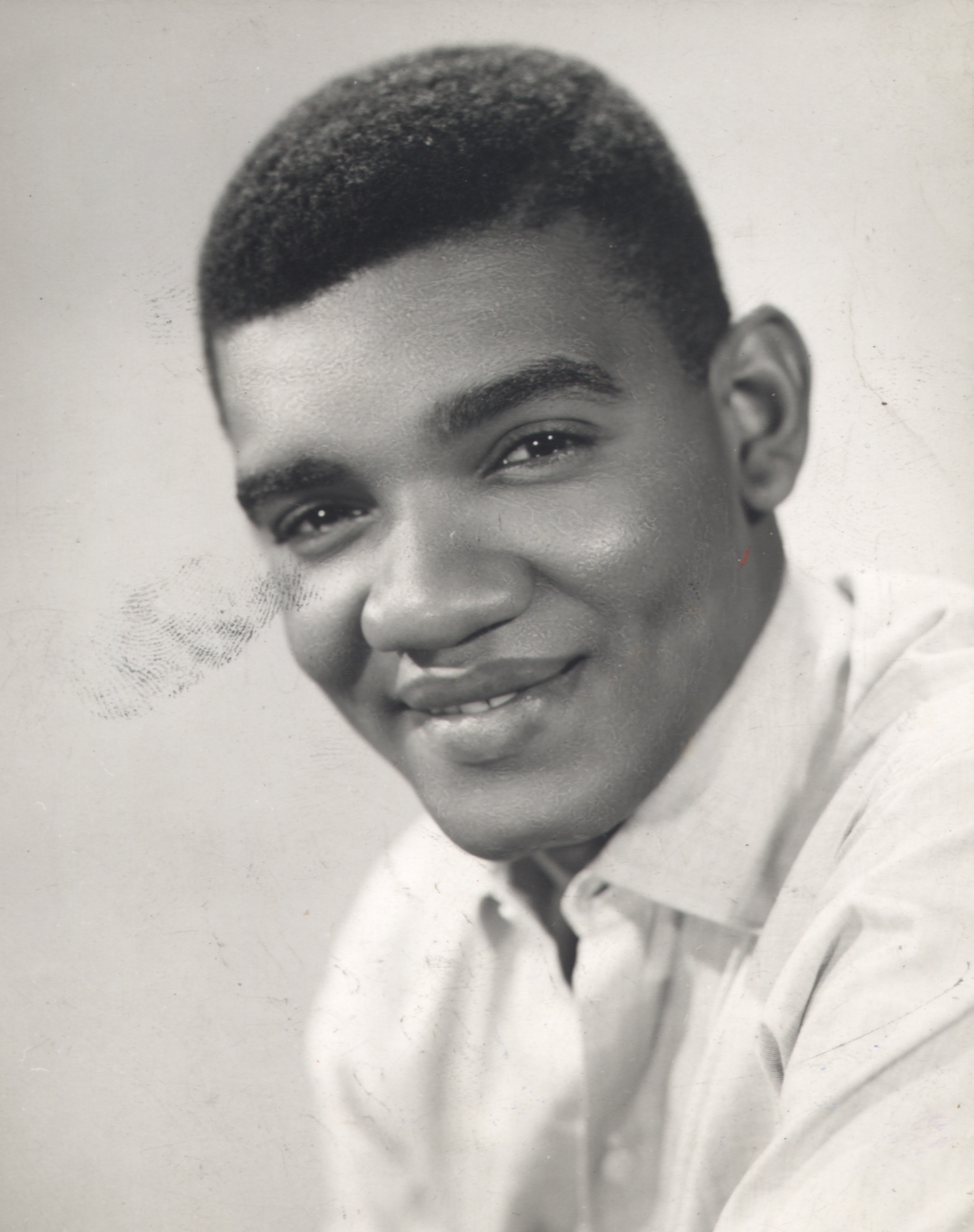
- Born: February 23, 1938; Rio de Janeiro, Federal District, Brazil
- Died: June 25, 2000 (aged 62); São Paulo, São Paulo, Brazil
- Spouses: Tereza Leite Pugliesi (m. 1963, divorced) Sandra Manzini Cerqueira (m. 1994)
- Children: 3, with Tereza
- Musical career
- Genres: Bossa nova; calypso; cha-cha-chá; doo-wop; MPB; samba; soul; rock
- Instruments: Vocals; pandeiro; piano; trumpet
- Labels: BMG; EMI; Odeon; Philips; PolyGram; RCA; UMG; WMG
- Formerly of: Dry Boys
- Website: www.simonal.com

Wilson Simonal de Castro (February 23, 1938 – June 25, 2000) was a Brazilian singer. He was a singer with great success in the 1960s and in the first half of the 1970s. He was married two times and had two sons: Wilson Simoninha and Max de Castro, both are artists today. He also had a daughter, named Patricia.

Although relatively unknown outside of South America, two of his biggest hits were successfully covered by Sérgio Mendes — "País Tropical" and "Sá Marina" (the latter as "Pretty World" with English lyrics by Marilyn and Alan Bergman).

== Discography ==
=== From Studio ===
- 1963 – Wilson Simonal Tem "algo mais"
- 1964 – A nova dimensão do samba
- 1965 – Wilson Simonal
- 1965 – S'imbora
- 1966 – Vou deixar cair...
- 1967 – Wilson Simonal ao vivo
- 1967 – Show em Simonal
- 1967 – Alegria, alegria !!!
- 1968 – Alegria, alegria – volume 2, ou Quem não tem swing morre com a boca cheia de formiga
- 1969 – Alegria, alegria – volume 3, ou Cada um tem o disco que merece
- 1969 – Alegria, alegria – volume 4, ou Homenagem à graça, à beleza, ao charme e ao veneno da mulher brasileira
- 1970 – Simona
- 1970 – México 70
- 1971 – Jóia, Jóia
- 1972 – Se dependesse de mim
- 1973 – Olhaí, balândro... é bufo no birrolho grinza!
- 1974 – Dimensão 75
- 1975 – Ninguém proíbe o amor
- 1977 – A vida é só cantar
- 1979 – Se todo mundo cantasse seria bem mais fácil viver
- 1981 – Wilson Simonal
- 1985 – Alegria tropical
- 1991 – Os sambas da minha terra
- 1995 – Brasil
- 1998 – Bem Brasil – Estilo Simonal

=== Compact ===
- 1961 – Teresinha / Biquínis e borboletas (Carlos Imperial / Fernando César)
- 1962 – Eu te amo/ Beija, meu bem
- 1962 – Compacto Isto é Drink: Tem que balançar / Olhou pra mim
- 1963 – Walk right in / Fale de samba que eu vou
- 1963 – Está nascendo um samba / Garota legal
- 1965 – De manhã / ... das rosas / Cuidado cantor – Passarinho-Nega – Não ponha a mão
- 1966 – Se você gostou
- 1966 – Mamãe passou açúcar em mim / Tá por fora
- 1966 – Compacto em espanhol: Mamãe passou açúcar em mim / A praça
- 1966 – A banda / Disparada / Quem samba fica / Máscara negra
- 1967 – Tributo a Martin Luther King / Deixa quem quiser falar
- 1967 – A praça / Ela é demais
- 1967 – Balada do Vietnã / O milagre
- 1968 – O samba do crioulo doido / Alegria, alegria / Pata, pata / A rosa da roda
- 1968 – Correnteza / A saudade mata a gente / Terezinha de Jesus
- 1968 – A namorada de um amigo meu
- 1969 – Se você pensa
- 1970 – Na Tonga da mironga do kabuletê / No clarão da lua cheia
- 1970 – Compacto em italiano: País tropical / Ecco il tipo (che io cercavo)
- 1970 – Kiki / Menininhas do Leblon / Aqui é o país do futebol / Eu sonhei que tu estavas tão linda
- 1970 – Brasil, eu fico / Canção nº 21 / Resposta / Que cada um cumpra com o seu dever
- 1970 – Compacto Promo Shell: Hino do V Festival Internacional da Canção / Brasil, eu fico / Que cada um cumpra com o seu dever
- 1971 – Obrigado, Pelé
- 1971 – Na Galha do Cajueiro / Ouriço / África África

=== Posthumous and collections ===
- 1994 – A Bossa e o Balanço
- 1997 – Meus momentos: Wilson Simonal
- 2002 – De A a Z: Wilson Simonal
- 2003 – Alegria, alegria
- 2003 – Se todo mundo cantasse seria bem mais fácil viver (relançamento)
- 2004 – Rewind – Simonal Remix
- 2004 – Wilson Simonal na Odeon (1961–1971)
- 2004 – Série Retratos: Wilson Simonal
- 2009 – Wilson Simonal – Um Sorriso Pra Você

=== Soundtrack ===
- 2009 – Simonal – Ninguém Sabe o Duro Que Dei
