= Manuel Gusmão =

Portuguese academic, poet, and politician (1945–2023)

Member of the Assembly of the Republic of Portugal
- In office 3 June 1976 – 2 January 1980

Member of the Constituent Assembly of Portugal
- In office 2 June 1975 – 2 April 1976

Personal details
- Born: Manuel Mendes Nobre de Gusmão; 11 December 1945 Évora, Portugal
- Died: 9 November 2023 (aged 77) Lisbon, Portugal
- Party: PCP
- Children: José Gusmão
- Education: University of Lisbon
- Occupation: Professor; Poet

Manuel Mendes Nobre de Gusmão (11 December 1945 – 9 November 2023) was a Portuguese academic, poet, essayist, translator, and politician of the Portuguese Communist Party (PCP).

== Biography ==
Born in Évora on 11 December 1945, Gusmão earned a degree in Roman philology from the University of Lisbon with a thesis titled Poética de Francis Ponge. He then became a professor of Portuguese literature, French literature, and literary theory at his alma mater. He was a member of the International Comparative Literature Association and a founding member of the Associação Portuguesa de Literatura Comparada. He founded the journals Ariane and Dedalus and became editorial coordinator of Vértice in 1988.

Gusmão was the winner of the 2004 Prémio D. Dinis, the Premio Vergílio Ferreira in 2005, and the Grande Prémio de Literatura DST in 2009.

A longtime activist within the PCP, which was banned during the Estado Novo regime, Gusmão served in the Constituent Assembly from 1975 to 1976 and in the Assembly of the Republic from 1976 to 1980.

Manuel Gusmão died in Lisbon on 9 November 2023, at the age of 77.

== Works ==
=== Essays ===
- A Poesia de Carlos de Oliveira (1981)
- A Poesia de Alberto Caeiro (1986)

=== Poems ===
- Dois Sois, A Rosa - A Arquitectura do Mundo (1990/2001)
- Mapas: o Assombro e a Sombra (1996)
- Teatros do Tempo (1994-2000) (2001)
- Os Dias Levantados (2002)
- Migrações do Fogo (2004)
- Mapas o Assombro a Sombra (2005)
- A Terceira Mão (2008)
- Pequeno Tratado das Figuras (2013)
