= Samba Esquema Novo =

Studio album by Jorge Ben
- Released: 10 January 1963
- Genres: Bossa nova; pop
- Length: 28:47
- Label: Philips
- Producer: Armando Pittigliani

Jorge Ben chronology
Samba Esquema Novo (1963)	Sacundin Ben Samba (1964)

Professional ratings
Review scores
Source	Rating
AllMusic	3.5/5 stars
Tom Hull – on the Web	B+

Samba Esquema Novo is the 1963 debut album by Brazilian singer-songwriter and guitarist Jorge Ben. It includes the original recording of the international hit "Mas que Nada".

== Release and reception ==
By the time of the album's release, newspaper O Estado de S. Paulo believed it would soon disappear from the stores, just like his previous 78 RPM releases.

In 2007, it was listed by Rolling Stone Brazil as one of the 100 best Brazilian albums in history. American critic Rodney Taylor wrote of the album: "His first album, which translates to 'New Style Samba,' sets out his ambitions. Spritely, percussive guitar anchors the songs, and Ben's smooth/rough voice puts them across. Horns, percussion and strings color the tunes, but never pull the focus from Ben. 'Mas que Nada' ranks as one of the most popular songs in the world." In Los 600 de Latinoamérica, a ranking created by several Latin American music journalists covering the years 1920 to 2022, Samba Esquema Novo was ranked 27th. It was ranked 30th in Discoteca Básica's List of the 500 Greatest Brazilian Records, chosen by 162 Brazilian music experts.

== Track listing ==
All tracks written by Jorge Ben except where noted

1. "Mas que Nada" – 3:02
2. "Tim Dom Dom" – 2:21 (João Mello / Clodoaldo Brito)
3. "Balança Pema" – 1:29
4. "Vem Morena" – 1:59
5. "Chove Chuva" – 3:06
6. "É Só Sambar" – 2:06
7. "Rosa, Menina Rosa" – 2:15
8. "Quero Esquecer Você" – 2:22
9. "Uála Uálalá" – 2:09
10. "A Tamba" – 3:04
11. "Menina Bonita Não Chora" – 2:07
12. "Por Causa de Você, Menina" – 2:47

== Personnel ==
According to AllMusic:

- Jorge Ben – vocals, violão
- Manuel Gusmão – bass
- Luís Carlos Vinhas – piano
- J. T. Meirelles – flute, saxophone
- Pedro Paulo – trumpet
- Dom Um Romão – drums

== Charts ==
Chart performance for Samba Esquema Novo
Chart (2024)	Peak position
Portuguese Albums (AFP)	109
