= Samba funk =

Music genre

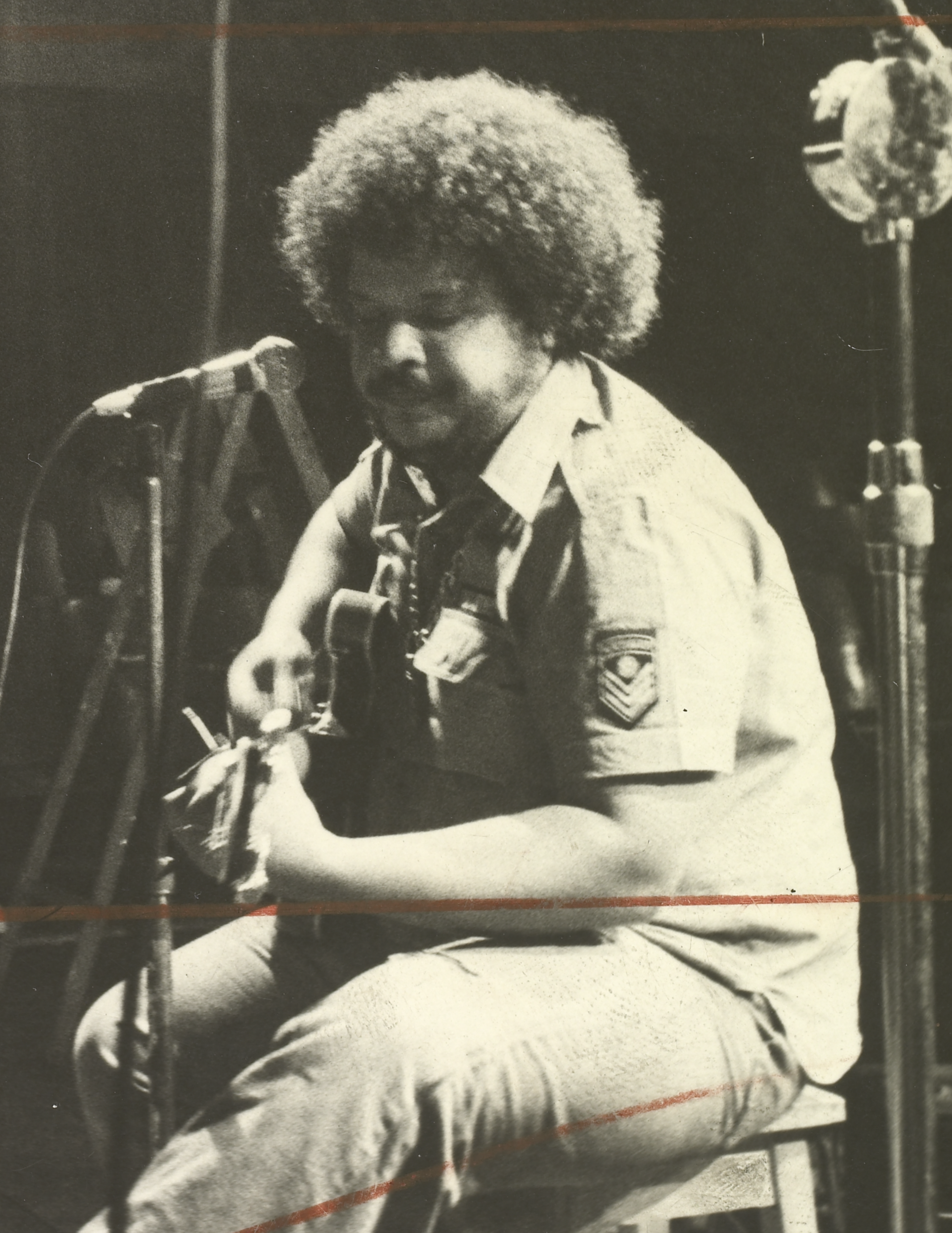
- Tim Maia in 1972.
- Stylistic origins: MPB; samba; funk
- Cultural origins: Late 1960s, Rio de Janeiro, Brazil

Regional scenes
- Brazil

Other topics
- Lusophone music; Samba rock

Samba funk is a musical subgenre that fuses Brazilian samba and American funk. It originated in the late 1960s by pianist Dom Salvador and the Brazilian band Grupo Abolição (which later gave rise to Banda Black Rio) and based on a blend of the binary measures of samba and the quaternary measures of funk, which had recently arrived on the Brazilian music market.

Brazilian singers and bands such as Tim Maia, Jorge Ben and Banda Black Rio have also pioneered into the genre.

== Characteristics ==
Samba funk is a hybrid musical subgenre that combines elements of Brazilian samba with American funk, its rhythm mostly composed by keyboards, electric guitar, bass guitar, drums and percussion, creating a hybrid and contagious sound. The bass, drums and guitar lines transition between the two styles. Samba funk uses instrumentation, timbres, and effects common in 1970s American funk bands, such as the Rhodes electric piano, clavinet, and Moog and Oberheim analog synthesizers. Musical effects such as the wah-wah on the guitar also contribute to the genre's sound.

== History ==
From the 1964 Brazilian coup d'état, the country lived under a repressive military dictatorship, which was accompanied by a strong countercultural reaction. Dom Salvador was an instrumentalist, arranger and composer who took part in the musical effervescence of Rio de Janeiro after the emergence of bossa nova, and combined Brazilian samba with American jazz, participating in the creation of samba jazz.

In 1969, Dom Salvador's producer at CBS returned from a trip to the USA with a number of funk and soul records, including Kool & the Gang, Sly and the Family Stone and James Brown. He suggested that Salvador do something similar, but Salvador refused to simply copy. He created a major departure from jazz, interpreting funk through the prism of samba with his band Grupo Abolição, with whom they also played samba funk and samba soul. Grupo Abolição's work in blending samba and funk influenced the formation of Banda Black Rio in 1976, which was named after the 1970s counterculture Black Rio.

== Ballroom dance ==
Based on this genre, a ballroom dance rhythm emerged thanks to dance teacher Jimmy de Oliveira called samba-funkeado, a style that mixes samba de gafieira with charme (which has their origins in hip-hop), distinguished by the funkeado body movement; a broken dance, influenced by hip-hop and soul, which works on breaks in dance and body movements, as well as on temporal pauses in the music, which at many points resemble photographs.

== Bibliography ==
- Albin, Ricardo Cravo (n.d.). "Dom Salvador" (in Portuguese). Dicionário Cravo Albin da Música Popular Brasileira.
- Essinger, Silvio (2005). Batidão: uma história do funk (in Portuguese). Rio de Janeiro: Editora Record. ISBN 9788501071651.
- Guimarães, Celso (2008). "Banda Black Rio e o samba-funk: um estudo de caso". Dissertação Mestrado em Música. Rio de Janeiro.
- Herschmann, Micael (1997). Abalando os anos 90: funk e hip-hop : globalização, violência e estilo cultural (in Portuguese). Michigan: Rocco. ISBN 9788551804070.
- Kassel, Matthew (2018-11-19). "Dom Salvador, o pianista que inventou o samba funk e o Brasil esqueceu". Universo Online (in Portuguese).
- Medeiros, Janaína (2006). Funk carioca: crime ou cultura?: o som dá medo e prazer (in Portuguese). São Paulo: Editoras Albatroz, Loqüi e Terceiro Nome. ISBN 9788587556745.
- Nestrovski, Arthur Rosenblat (2002). Música Popular Brasileira Hoje (in Portuguese). Vol. 50. Publifolha. ISBN 8574024058.
- Tavares, Heloá Goes (2016). "Uma dança quebrada: o samba funkeado na CIA de Dança Cabanos em Belém do Pará". Licenciatura em Dança (bachelor's thesis in dance) (in Portuguese). Universidade Federal do Para.
- Zan, José Roberto (2005). "Funk, soul e jazz na terra do samba: a sonoridadeda Banda Black Rio". ArtCultura (in Portuguese). 7 (11). ISSN 2178-3845.
