= Jorge Ben =

Brazilian musician

Jorge Ben Jor
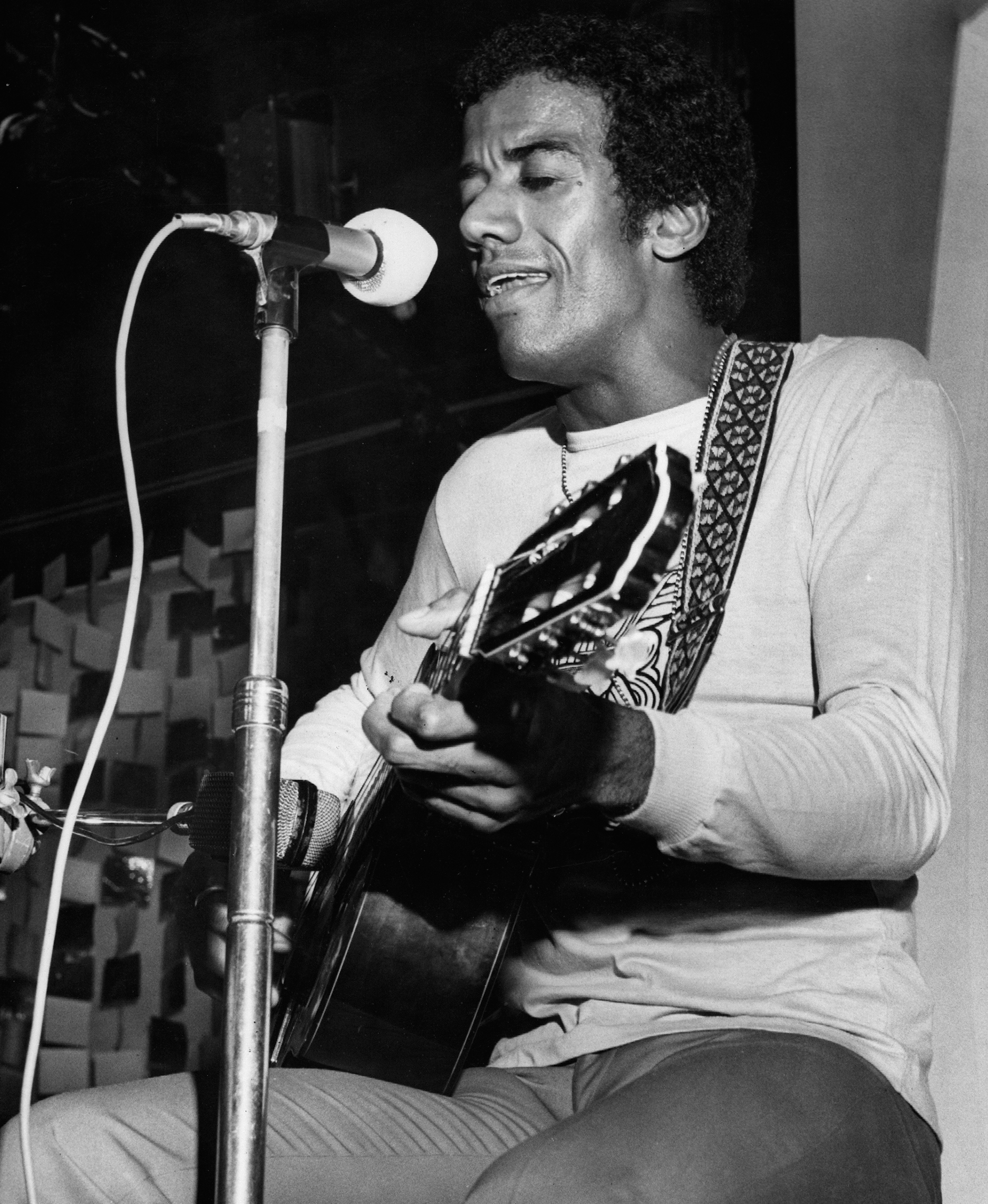
- Jorge Ben in 1972

Background information
- Born: Jorge Duílio Lima Menezes; March 22, 1939 (age 87)
- Origin: Rio de Janeiro, Brazil
- Genres: MPB; samba rock; sambalanço; samba funk; tropicália; bossa nova
- Occupations: Singer; songwriter; musician
- Instruments: Vocals, guitar
- Years active: 1963–present
- Website: jorgebenjor.com.br

Jorge Duílio Lima Menezes (born March 22, 1939) is a Brazilian popular musician, performing under the stage name Jorge Ben Jor since the 1980s, though commonly known by his former stage name Jorge Ben (Brazilian Portuguese: [ˌʒɔʁʒi ˈbẽj]). Performing in a samba style that also explored soul, funk, rock and bossa nova sounds, Ben has recorded such well-known songs as "Chove Chuva", "Mas Que Nada", "Ive Brussel" and "Balança Pema". His music has been covered by artists such as Caetano Veloso, Sérgio Mendes, Miriam Makeba, Soulfly and Marisa Monte. His musical work has been vastly sampled by music producers and DJs in a variety of genres such as jazz funk, disco, and acid jazz.

Ben's broad-minded and original approach to samba led him through participation in some of Brazilian popular music's most important musical movements, such as bossa nova, Jovem Guarda, and Tropicália, with the latter period defined by his albums Jorge Ben (1969) and Fôrça Bruta (1970). He has been called "the father of samba rock", by Billboard magazine. According to American music critic Robert Christgau, Ben and his contemporary Gilberto Gil were "always ready to go further out on a beat than the other samba/bossa geniuses". In 2021, Rolling Stone ranked Ben's 1976 song "Ponta de Lança Africano (Umbabarauma)" number 351 in its updated list of the 500 Greatest Songs of All Time.

== Biography ==
=== Early life and career ===
Born Jorge Duílio Lima Menezes in Rio de Janeiro, he first took the stage name Jorge Ben after his mother's name (Sílvia Saint Ben Lima, Brazilian-born of Ethiopian origin) but in 1989 changed it to Jorge Ben Jor (commonly written Benjor). Jorge is one of four brothers. His parents wanted him to either be a lawyer or pediatrician.

Jorge Ben obtained his first pandeiro (Brazil's most popular type of tambourine) when he was thirteen, and two years later, was singing in a church choir. He also took part as a pandeiro player in the blocos of Carnaval, and from eighteen years of age, he began performing at parties and nightclubs with the guitar given to him by his mother. He was given the nickname "Babulina" after his enthusiastic pronunciation of rockabilly singer Ronnie Self's song "Bop-A-Lena". He was introduced to Tim Maia by Erasmo Carlos. Jorge also liked Little Richard. As with most musicians of the time, Ben was initially influenced by João Gilberto. Jorge Ben's first public appearances were in small festivals organised by his friends, where bossa nova and rock and roll predominated. It was in 1963 at one of those clubs in which he performed that Jorge's musical career took off; he came on stage and sang "Mas, que Nada!" to a small crowd that happened to include an executive from the recording company, Philips. One week later, Jorge Ben's first single was released.

Ben's 1963 debut album Samba Esquema Novo was met with great acclaim from fans, and encouraged Philips to capitalize on the success with immediate follow-up albums. The label pressured Ben to hastily record songs imitative of his debut, along with cover songs, resulting in the three albums within the span of 18 months and a strain on the singer's relationship with Philips. He left the label after his 1965 album Big Ben.

Ben composed the song "Mas, que Nada!" in 1963. Outside of Brazil, the song is better known in cover versions by Sérgio Mendes and the Tamba Trio. The song has also been reinterpreted by prominent jazz artists including Ella Fitzgerald, Oscar Peterson, Dizzy Gillespie and Al Jarreau; as well as other samba artists of the time, such as Elza Soares.

The hybrid rhythms that Jorge employed brought him some problems at the start of his career, when Brazilian music was split between the rockier sounds of the Jovem Guarda and traditional samba with its complex lyrics.However, as that phase in Brazilian pop music history passed and bossa nova became better known throughout the world, Ben rose to prominence.

=== Success ===
In 1969, Jorge Ben released his eponymous album amid the excitement of the cultural and musical Tropicália movement. The album featured Trio Mocotó as his backing band, which would go on to launch a successful career on the back of its association with Ben. The album was noted for "País Tropical", one of his most famous compositions, although it would be Wilson Simonal who would take his recording of the song to the top of the charts in Brazil that same year. Instead, the song "Charles, Anjo 45", also from the self-titled album, would become Ben's biggest self-performed chart hit of the year. Ben recorded "Taji Mahal" in 1972.

Jorge Ben released his most esoteric and experimental albums in the 1970s, most notably A Tábua de Esmeralda in 1974 and Solta o Pavão in 1975. The following year he released one of his most popular albums, África Brasil (1976), a fusion of funk and samba that relied more on the electric guitar than previous efforts. This album also features a remake of his previously released song "Taj Mahal." With its commercial success and sustained radio play, the melody made its way into the 1979 hit "Da Ya Think I'm Sexy?" by Rod Stewart. Ben sued for plagiarism and Stewart settled the lawsuit and donated the single’s royalties to UNICEF.

In 1989, Jorge changed his recording label as well as his artistic name, becoming Jorge Benjor (or Jorge Ben Jor). At the time, it was said that there were numerous reasons for his change in name; other sources say it was in response to an incident where some of his royalties accidentally went to American guitarist George Benson.

An estimated 3 million people attended Jorge's New Year's Eve open concert in 1993.

=== Recent career ===
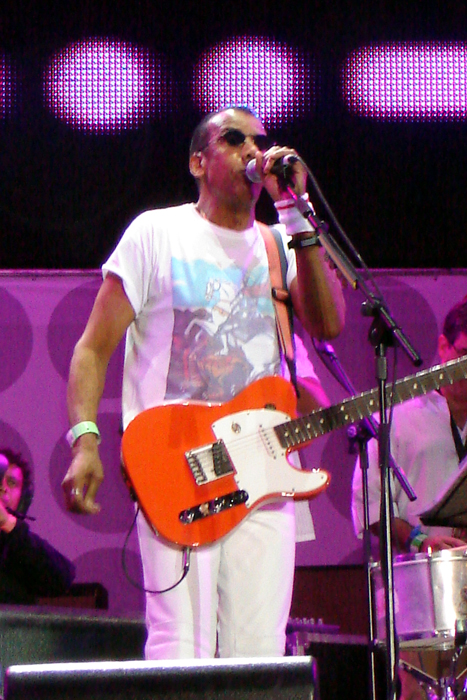
Jorge Ben at Live Earth in 2007

In 2002, Jorge Ben contributed to the critically acclaimed Red Hot + Riot, a compilation CD created by the Red Hot Organization in tribute to the music and work of Nigerian musician Fela Kuti, which raised money for various charities devoted to raising AIDS awareness and fighting the disease. He collaborated with hip-hop artists Dead Prez, Talib Kweli, and Bilal to remake Fela Kuti's famous song "Shuffering and Shmiling" for the CD.

Ben was presented with the Lifetime Achievement Award by the Latin Recording Academy in 2005. A year later, a remake of Ben's "Mas, que Nada!" became an international chart hit for Sérgio Mendes with The Black Eyed Peas after being used by Nike in a global TV advertisement during the 2006 FIFA World Cup; this remake (the second time Mendes had covered the track) reached the Top 10 in several European countries, including the UK and Germany, in addition to reaching Number 1 in the Netherlands.

Jorge Ben is also a big fan of Flamengo, a Brazilian football club, located in Rio de Janeiro, which counts Zico, Junior and Leandro among their former star players. Ben's interest in football carries over to his music, as many of his songs deal with the subject, such as "Flamengo", "Camisa 10 da Gávea", "Ponta De Lança Africano (Umbabarauma)", "Zagueiro", "Fio Maravilha", and "A Loba Comeu o Canário".

On July 7, 2007, he performed at the Brazilian leg of Live Earth in Rio de Janeiro.

In 2012, Jorge was included in an unranked list of Rolling Stone Brasil's of the 30 greatest guitarists of the country.

Jorge was a participant in the 2016 Summer Olympics opening ceremony.

In 2025, Jorge was ordered to pay R$977,000 to a former collaborator.

== Personal life ==
Jorge Ben married Domingas Terezinha in 1971. They have two children. Since 2018, he has resided at the Copacabana Palace due to his home being destroyed in a flood.

== Discography ==
- 1963: Samba Esquema Novo
- 1964: Sacundin Ben Samba
- 1964: Ben É Samba Bom
- 1965: Big Ben
- 1967: O Bidú: Silêncio no Brooklin
- 1969: Jorge Ben
- 1970: Fôrça Bruta
- 1971: Negro É Lindo
- 1972: Ben
- 1973: 10 Anos Depois
- 1974: A Tábua de Esmeralda
- 1975: Solta o Pavão
- 1975: Jorge Ben à l'Olympia
- 1975: Gil e Jorge (with Gilberto Gil)
- 1976: África Brasil
- 1976: Samba Nova
- 1977: Tropical
- 1978: A Banda Do Zé Pretinho
- 1979: Salve Simpatia
- 1980: Alô, Alô, Como Vai?
- 1981: Bem Vinda Amizade
- 1983: Dadiva
- 1984: Sonsual
- 1986: Ben Brasil
- 1989: Ben Jor
- 1992: Live in Rio
- 1994: 23
- 1995: Homo sapiens
- 1997: Musicas Para Tocar Em Elevador
- 2000: Puro Suingue
- 2002: Acústico MTV – Double CD release, available jointly or separately, consisting of Admiral Jorge V and Banda do Zé Pretinho
- 2004: Reactivus Amor Est (Turba Philosophorum)
- 2006: Sou da Pesada (7 Samurai Afroraduno Remix)/A Joven Samba *(Klasick Remix)
- 2007: Recuerdos de Assunción 443
- 2008: Favourites: From Samba Esquema Novo 1963 – África Brasil 1976
- 2010: Salve Jorge! Inéditas e Raridades
