= Mulamba =

Brazilian all-female musical group from Curitiba

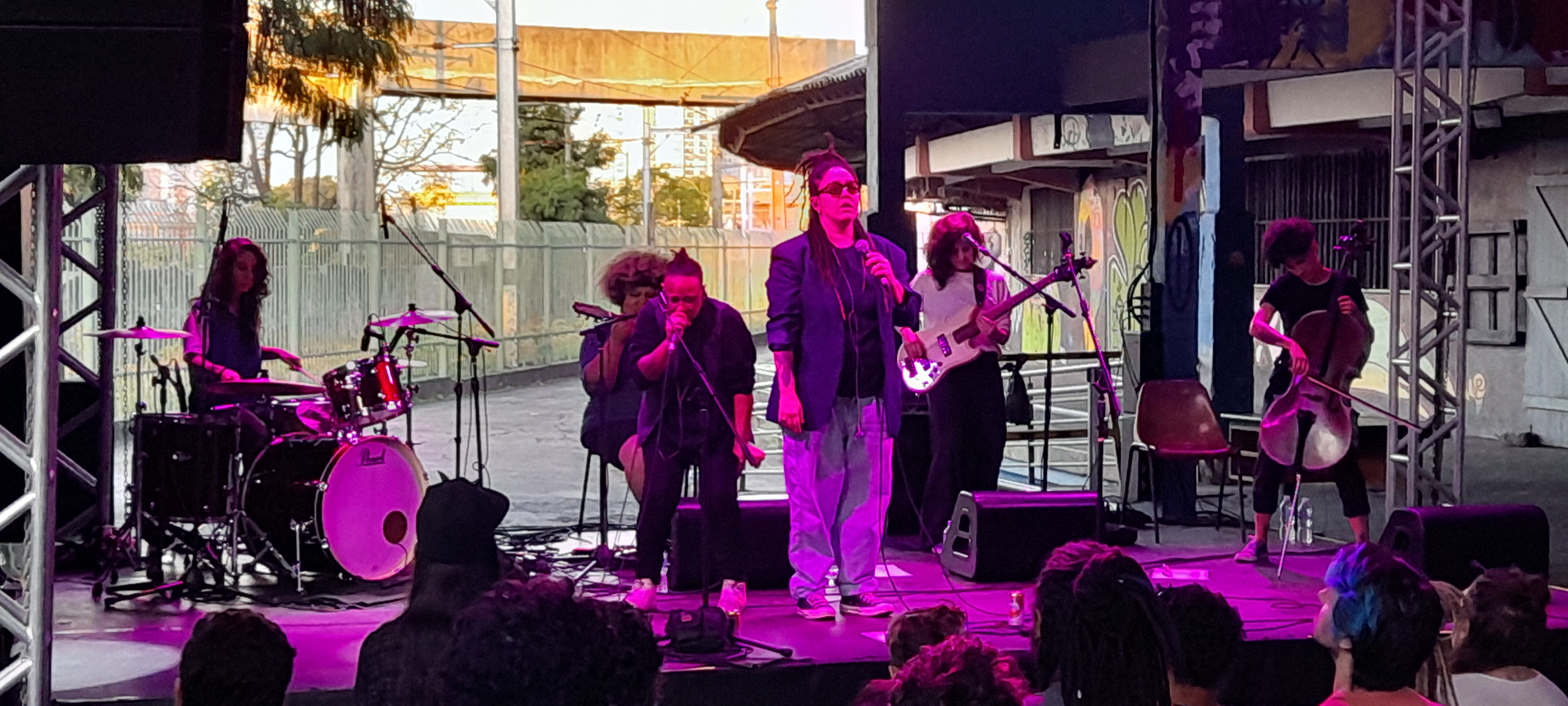
- The band during one of their farewell shows in São Paulo in 2023. From left to right: Caro Pisco, Érica Silva, Cacau de Sá, Amanda Pacífico, Naíra Debertolis and Fer Koppe

Background information
- Origin: Curitiba, Paraná, Brazil
- Genres: Rock, MPB
- Years active: 2015–2023
- Label: Máquina Discos
- Past members: Amanda Pacífico; Cacau de Sá; Fer Koppe; Naíra Debertolis; Caro Pisco; Érica Silva; Nat Fragoso
- Website: mulamba.com.br

Mulamba was a Brazilian rock and MPB band formed in 2015 in Curitiba. The group is an all-female one (including the production team and roadies) and they write songs discussing violence against women, women's empowerment, the fight against sexism and gender equality.

== History ==
=== Formation and name (2015–2018) ===
The group was formed in December 2015 (more precisely on the 10th) in the city of Curitiba by women from several parts of Brazil, originally as aCássia Eller tribute act. Vocalist Cacau de Sá is from Pelotas and guitarist and bassist Naíra Debértolis comes from Porto Alegre (both in the state of Rio Grande do Sul).

Members chose the name "Mulamba" in order to re-signify the word, depriving it of its pejorative sense and demonstrating "force and leadership". According to the dictionary, "mulamba" means "a sloppy, messy, ugly and stinky person who leaves the house in a skunky state".

Two of the members, Debértolis and vocalist Amanda Pacífico, already performed together on Orquestra Friorenta, and they joined Sá, cellist Fer Koppe and drummer Caro Pisco, who performed together on the bands Farrapos and Watch Out for the Hounds.

=== Mulamba (2018–2020) ===
The sextet began writing their own songs after winning, through popular vote, a slot at Vento Festival in São Sebastião, on the coastline of the state of São Paulo, and also the recording of a self-titled album at a Red Bull studio. Besides the album, the video clip for "P.U.T.A." also helped to boost their popularity.

They were planning an EP for the first half of 2017, with Du Gomide as a producer, but in 2018, it wasn't ready yet. In 2 November of the same year, their debut album came, featuring Juliana Strassacapa (Francisco, el Hombre) and Lio Soares (Tuyo).

In October of the same year, they took part in the "Escuta as Minas" (Listen to the Girls) Spotify campaign to provide more visibility to women in Brazilian music. The initiative involved Elza Soares, Karol Conka, Maiara & Maraisa, Tiê, Mart'nália, Lan Lan, As Bahias e a Cozinha Mineira and Mulamba themselves for a tribute to Chiquinha Gonzaga, Maysa and Cássia Eller.

In April 2019, they planned a second album. Around the same time, they announced a new song, "Dandara", about violence against travestis and homosexuals. In August of the same year, they were the warm-up band of a Pitty show in Curitiba during her Matriz Tour. In October, they took part in a show in Florianópolis celebrating the birthday of former Brazilian president Luiz Inácio Lula da Silva, who was in prison back then following corruption accusations.

During the quarantine imposed by the COVID-19 pandemic, Pisco and Debertolis stayed at the house of a friend in Curitiba. Pisco studied musical software and Debertolis composed new songs with Sá via WhatsApp.

=== Será Só aos Ares and end of the band (2022–2023) ===
In 2022, the group released their second album, Será Só aos Ares (a title that is a palindrome and roughly translates as "[It] Will Be Only to the Airs"), featuring Luedji Luna, BNegão, Kaê Guajajara, MEL (ex-Banda Uó), Caramelows and Agnes.

In May 2023, the girls announced their disbandment on their Instagram profile, stating that "the time has come to hit the brakes, come back home or leave it, time to rest the heart or make it beat even faster...Let it be a new awakening". The band promoted three farewell shows in São Paulo the following month.

== Musical style, lyrical themes and influences ==
Journalists have seen elements of heavy metal, hard rock, MPB, funk carioca, classical music, guitarrada, cumbia, samba, gospel, rap, funk and batuque in Mulamba's music. The members say they are influenced by carimbó, samba, classic rock, blues, rap and classical music.

Mulamba's music is focused in topics such as violence against women, women's empowerment, fight against sexism and gender equality. They also discuss woman-to-woman love relationships and specific episodes such as the Mariana dam disaster and a police brutality incident in Vila Vintém.

Cellist Fer Koppe is part of the Free the Nipple movement.

Besides Cássia Eller herself, members cite Rita Lee, Astor Piazzolla, Tuyo, Gal Costa, Marisa Monte, Elza Soares, Bibi Ferreira, Édith Piaf, Nina Simone, Oshun, Elisa Lucinda, Elis Regina, Fernanda Montenegro, Clementina de Jesus, Zezé Motta, Carolina de Jesus, Aretha Franklin, Chavela Vargas, Juçara Marçal, Dona Ivone Lara, Carmen Miranda, Clara Nunes, Big Mama Thornton, Horrorosas Desprezíveis, Jovelina Pérola Negra, Agnes Ignácio, Janine Mathias, Bia Ferreira, Thalma de Freitas, Jéssica Caetano, Pitty, Rosa Luz and Francisco, el Hombre as some of their influences and inspirations.

== Members ==
=== Final members ===
Sources:

- Amanda Pacífico — lead vocals (2015–2023)
- Cacau de Sá — vocals (2015–2023)
- Érica Silva — electric and acoustic guitar, bass (2018-2023)
- Naíra Debertolis — electric and acoustic guitar, bass (2015–2023)
- Caro Pisco — drums (2015–2023)
- Fer Koppe — cello (2015–2023)

=== Former member ===
- Nat Fragoso — guitar (2015 - ?)

== Discography ==
=== Albuns ===
- Mulamba (2018)
- Será Só aos Ares (2023)

=== Singles ===
- "P.U.T.A."(2016)
- "Desses Nadas" (2018)
