= Veneno (album) =

Studio album by Banda Uó
- Released: July 4, 2015
- Recorded: 2015
- Genre: EDM; pop; trap
- Length: 43:00
- Label: Deckdisc
- Producer: Davi Sabbag; Yuri Chix; Fábio Smeili; Pedrowl Gorky; Boss in Drama; Bernardo Martins

Banda Uó chronology
Motel (2012)	Veneno (2015)

Singles from Veneno
- 1. "É da Rádio" Released: August 11, 2015; 2. "Dá1LIKE" Released: November 24, 2015; 3. "Arregaçada" Released: May 23, 2016; 4. "Cremosa" Released: November 17, 2016; 5. "Sauna" Released: May 4, 2017

Veneno (stylized as VENENO) is the second studio album by Brazilian band Banda Uó. It was released on September 4, 2015, by Deckdisc. The album has twelve tracks, besides the hit song "Catraca", featuring Mr. Catra. The lead single is "É da Rádio," with a production inspired by The Offspring's "Pretty Fly (for a White Guy)".

== Background and development ==
The band's previous album, Motel, earned the attention from the internet and was very well received by critics. Mateus Carrilho said in an interview that the band's new album would have more less brega music and more pop, reaching larger audiences with radio-friendly songs. He further stated that the new album would be different from the band's previous releases.

In search of new sonorities, the band got to collaborate with different producers, including Boss in Drama, Rodrigo Gorky, Pedrowl and Bernardo Martins. The band co-wrote all of the songs: "It was a delight to do this second album, ideas bubbled up and we put everything out," Davi Sabbag said.

== Critical reception ==
Professional ratings
Review scores
Source	Rating
It Pop	4/5 stars
Portal Famosos Brasil	4/5 stars

In its first review, Veneno was praised for its production, since it maintains the good humor that marked the debut of the band, but with a vast sweep of inspirations, mainly from what was being successful in Brazil in the 90s.

For Brazilian website It Pop, the album "demonstrates that [the band] still has a lot to explore within their influences" and "while they play with songwriting that revives the national pop, awakening in us a more determined appetite for this genre so underestimated [in Brazil] (...) they go through references to past decades, however looking forward." The website still compared the sound to artists such as Mamonas Assassinas, Bonde do Rolê and Blitz.

Portal Famosos Brasil also provided the album a favorable review, stating that "Veneno ends with an auricular injection of adrenaline, extroversion and euphoria that leave the bittersweet taste of 'I want more'" and "with the wonderful trashy cover art to the commercial yet risky content they prove, once again, that pop music doesn't need to be taken seriously to have quality."

== Copyright claims ==
The music video for Arregaçada was removed from the band's YouTube channel after alleged accusations that they didn't have permission to use the sample of MC Hammer's U Can't Touch This – which in turn samples Rick James's Super Freak – in the video. Before being removed the video had only 4,8 million views. As of November 2017, the video has been made available on the channel.

== Track listing ==
No.	Title	Writer(s)	Producer(s)	Length
1.	"É da Rádio"	Mateus Carrilho; Davi Sabbag	Sabbag	2:50
2.	"Cremosa"	Carrilho; Sabbag	Carrilho; Gorky	3:19
3.	"Primeiro Encontro"	Carrilho; Sabbag	Pedrowl; Sabbag	3:11
4.	"Sonho Molhado"	Carrilho; Sabbag	Sabbag	3:26
5.	"Boneca"	Carrilho; Sabbag; Victor Miranda	Sabbag	3:25
6.	"Dá1LIKE" (featuring Karol Conká)	Carrilho; Sabbag	Sabbag; Yuri Chix; Fábio Smeili	3:33
7.	"Arregaçada (U Can't Touch This)"	Carrilho; Sabbag	Sabbag	3:04
8.	"Na Varanda"	Carrilho; Sabbag	Pedrowl; Sabbag	3:37
9.	"Sauna"	Sabbag; Carrilho; Mel Gonçalves; Pedrowl	Pedrowl; Sabbag	3:21
10.	"X-Bacon" (featuring Vanessa Jackson)	Sabbag; Carrilho	Péricles Martins; Sabbag	3:04
11.	"Suja"	Carrilho; Sabbag; Gonçalves; Pedro Lima	Sabbag	3:05
12.	"Poperô"	Carrilho; Sabbag	Bernardo Martins; Sabbag	4:06
Total length:				43:00

Bonus track
No.	Title	Writer(s)	Producer(s)	Length
13.	"Catraca" (featuring Mr. Catra)	Carrilho; DSabbag	Sabbag; Martins	3:07

Notes

- "É da Rádio" contains samples of "Pretty Fly (for a White Guy)" performed by The Offspring, and written by Dexter Holland.
- "Primeiro Encontro" contains samples of "Don't Lie" performed by The Black Eyed Peas, and written by William Adams, Stacy Ferguson, Jaime Gomez, Allan Pineda, Chris Peters, Drew Peters and Ricky Walters.
- "Boneca" contains samples of "We Belong Together" performed by Mariah Carey, and written by Carey, Jermaine Dupri, Manuel Seal, John Austin, Kenneth "Babyface" Edmonds, Bristol Darrell, Bobby Womack, Patrick Moten and Sandra Suly.
- "Arregaçada" contains samples of "Super Freak" performed by Rick James, and written by Stanley Burrell, Rick James and Alonzo Miller.
