= Mocidade Independente de Padre Miguel =

Samba school in Padre Miguel, Rio de Janeiro, Brazil

Mocidade
- Full name: Grêmio Recreativo Escola de Samba Mocidade Independente de Padre Miguel
- Foundation: 10 November 1955; 70 years ago
- Blessing school: Beija-Flor
- Colors
- Symbol: Five-pointed star
- Location: Padre Miguel
- President: Flávio Santos
Carnival staff
- Carnival producer: Marcus Ferreira
- Carnival singer: Nino do Milênio
- Director of Battery: Mestre Dudu
- Queen of Battery: Giovana Angélica
- Mestre-sala and Porta-Bandeira: Diogo Jesus e Bruna Santos
- Choreography: Marcos Pinna

Website
- mocidadeindependente.com.br

The Grêmio Recreativo Escola de Samba Mocidade Independente de Padre Miguel is a samba school of the city of Rio de Janeiro, being located on Rua Coronel Tamarindo, in the neighborhood of Padre Miguel.

== History ==
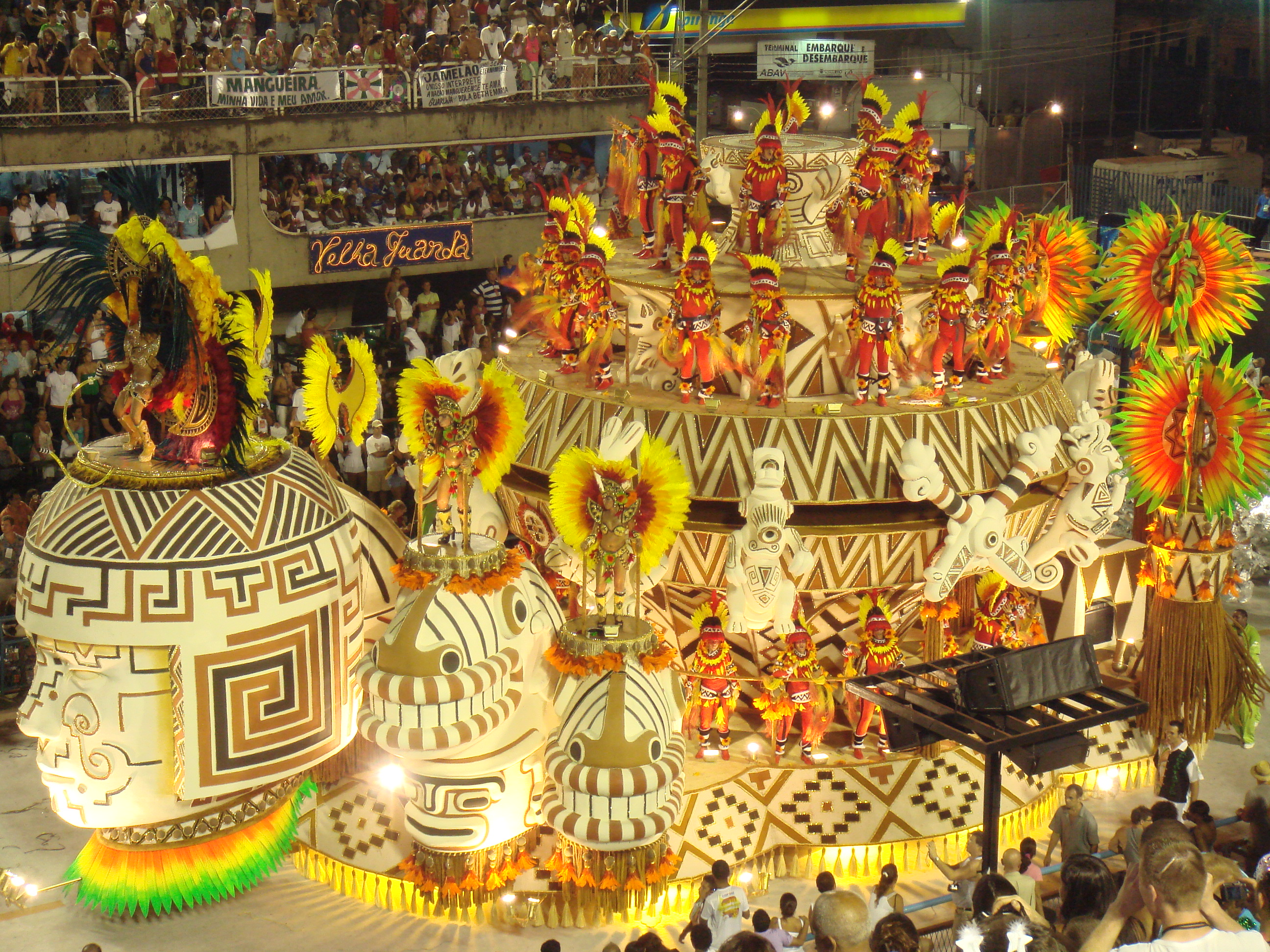
Carnival in Rio de Janeiro

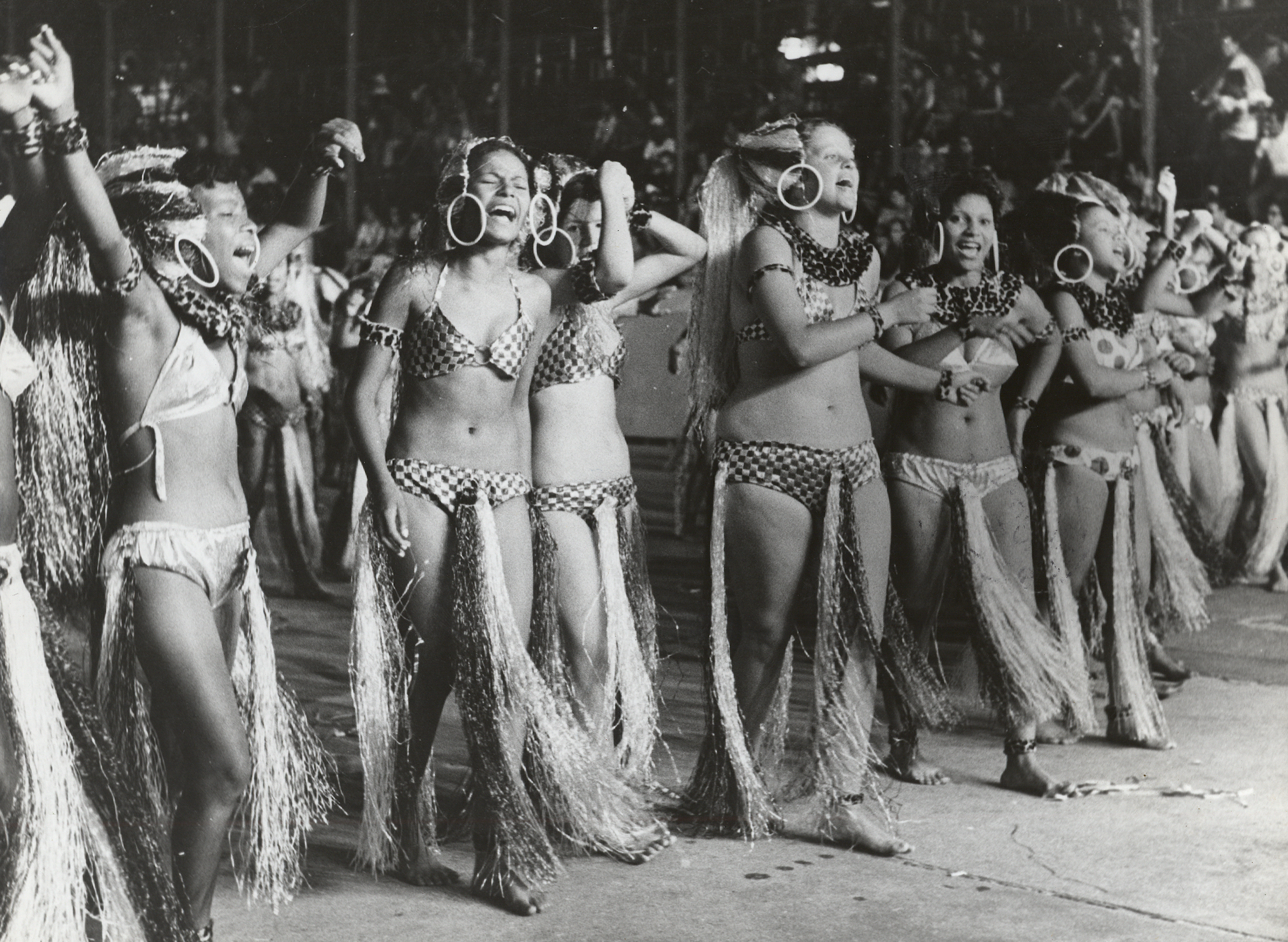
Parade of Mocidade Independente de Padre Miguel of 1972

The Mocidade was founded on 10 November 1955, by eight people: Silvio Trindade, Renato da Silva, Djalma Rosa, Olímpio Bonifácio (Bronquinha), Orozimbo de Oliveira (Seu Orozimbo), Garibaldi F. Lima, Felipe de Souza (Pavão), Ary de Lima e Alfredo Briggs. The first flag of the school was offered by Mrs. Gilda Faria Lima. The first queen of the school was Mrs. Neuza de Oliveira. The samba school participated for the first time, in an official parade, with the plot "O Baile das Rosas" ( "The Ball of Roses" ), when it got 5th place. In 1958, it was the champion of Group 2 with the plot "Apoteose ao Samba" ( "Apotheosis to the Samba" ). From 1959 forth, it took on Group 1 and did not anymore any relegation to the lower divisions.

In 1959, the bateria, under the expert Master André, gave for the first time the famous "paradinha" (the instant when the bateria of the school stops playing for some instants and during this period the samba-enredo is maintained with the song of the interpreters and of the members of the school) in front of the judging committee, maintaining the rhythm so that the school would continue developing. The folk would pass, later, to accompany such "bossa" with the shout of "Olé". During this period, the Mocidade was known as "a bateria that carried a school on its back", because the bateria was more known than the school itself, that only years later would become a school that would compete with the famous of that epoch (Portela, Império Serrano, Salgueiro and Mangueira).

In the year of 1974, Arlindo Rodrigues presented the plot "A Festa do Divino" ( "The Party of the Divine" ), getting 5th place. But on that same year the school could win the championship, had she not gotten 4 in clothing and 9 in harmony. The difference between Salgueiro and Mocidade was 6, therefore they would have tied only if Mocidade would have gotten 10. Even if they would tie, Salgueiro would win the championship because it got 10 in harmony.

From then on, the school stopped being known only because of the bateria, and became known as a good samba school. In 76, by irony, Mocidade tied second place, with Mangueira, and lost the decision for getting one point less in the so famous bateria. In 1979, still with Arlindo Rodrigues, Mocidade conquered for the first time the championship of the 1-A Division with "O Descobrimento do Brasil" ( "The Discovery of Brazil" ) in its debut appearance.

Next year, Fernando Pinto assumed the post of carnival producer and director, producing exceptional carnivals in Mocidade and becoming known as the most creative and ingenious carnival producer ever known.

In Fernando Pinto's first year in Mocidade, in 1980, the school conquered second place with the plot "Tropicália Maravilha" ( "Splendid Tropicália" ). In 1983, Mocidade received the banner of the best communication with the public with the plot "Como era verde o meu Xingu" ( "How was my Xingu Green" ).

In 1984 it became the Madrinha to the London School of Samba, the first samba school to be established in the UK. In 1989, Mocidade visited London to perform at the 3rd European Samba Encontro and formally adopt the LSS.

It advanced to the Special Group in 1990, and won three general championships since then. after years away from Champions Parade in youth gave a back on top, with a beautiful tribute to Morocco however in the final voting ended with vice-championship, which ratified title, due to error of a magistrate who used the Book Abre-Alas wrong. With this surprise the Mocidade Independente samba school thus won its fourth championship title, shared with Portela.

== Classifications ==
| Year | Place | Division | Plot | Carnivals Producers |
| Year | Place | Division | Plot | Singers |
|---|---|---|---|---|
| 1956 | Padre Miguel | | Castro Alves | Ari de Lima |
| 1956 | Padre Miguel | | Castro Alves | Tião Marino |
| 1957 | 5th place | Grupo 2 | O Baile das Rosas | Ari de Lima |
| 1957 | 5th place | Grupo 2 | O Baile das Rosas | Tião Marino |
| 1958 | Champion | Grupo 2 | Apoteose do Samba | Ari de Lima |
| 1958 | Champion | Grupo 2 | Apoteose do Samba | Tião Marino |
| 1959 | 5th place | Grupo 1 | Os Três Vultos que Ficaram na História | Ari de Lima |
| 1959 | 5th place | Grupo 1 | Os Três Vultos que Ficaram na História | Tião Marino |
| 1960 | 3rd place | Grupo 1 | Frases célebres | Ari de Lima |
| 1960 | 3rd place | Grupo 1 | Frases célebres | Tião Marino |
| 1961 | 7th place | Grupo 1 | Carnaval no Rio | Ari de Lima |
| 1961 | 7th place | Grupo 1 | Carnaval no Rio | Tião Marino |
| 1962 | 5th place | Grupo 1 | Brasil no campo cultural | Ari de Lima |
| 1962 | 5th place | Grupo 1 | Brasil no campo cultural | Tião Marino |
| 1963 | 6th place | Grupo 1 | As Minas Gerais | Ari de Lima |
| 1963 | 6th place | Grupo 1 | As Minas Gerais | Tião Marino |
| 1964 | 7th place | Grupo 1 | O Cacho da Banana | Ari de Lima |
| 1964 | 7th place | Grupo 1 | O Cacho da Banana | Tião Marino |
| 1965 | 6th place | Grupo 1 | Parabéns para Você, Rio | Luís Gardel |
| 1965 | 6th place | Grupo 1 | Parabéns para Você, Rio | Tião da Roça |
| 1966 | 6th place | Grupo 1 | Academia Brasileira de Letras | Guilherme Martins; Alfredo Brigs |
| 1966 | 6th place | Grupo 1 | Academia Brasileira de Letras | Tião da Roça |
| 1967 | 7th place | Grupo 1 | História do Teatro Através dos Tempos | Poty |
| 1967 | 7th place | Grupo 1 | História do Teatro Através dos Tempos | Tião da Roça |
| 1968 | 6th place | Grupo 1 | Viagem Pitoresca Através do Brasil | Mário Monteiro |
| 1968 | 6th place | Grupo 1 | Viagem Pitoresca Através do Brasil | Tião da Roça |
| 1969 | 7th place | Grupo 1 | Vida e Glória de Francisco Adolfo Varnhagen | Guilherme Martins; Alfredo Brigs |
| 1969 | 7th place | Grupo 1 | Vida e Glória de Francisco Adolfo Varnhagen | Tião da Roça |
| 1970 | 4th place | Grupo 1 | Meu Pé de Laranja Lima | Gabriel Nascimento; Ari de Castro |
| 1970 | 4th place | Grupo 1 | Meu Pé de Laranja Lima | Tião da Roça |
| 1971 | 9th place | Grupo 1 | Rapsódia de Saudade | Clóvis Bornay |
| 1971 | 9th place | Grupo 1 | Rapsódia de Saudade | Tôco |
| 1972 | 7th place | Grupo 1 | Rainha Mestiça em Tempo de Lundu | Clóvis Bornay |
| 1972 | 7th place | Grupo 1 | Rainha Mestiça em Tempo de Lundu | Tião da Roça; Elza Soares |
| 1973 | 7th place | Grupo 1 | Rio Zé Pereira | Arlindo Rodrigues |
| 1973 | 7th place | Grupo 1 | Rio Zé Pereira | Tião da Roça |
| 1974 | 5th place | Grupo 1 | A Festa do Divino | Arlindo Rodrigues |
| 1974 | 5th place | Grupo 1 | A Festa do Divino | Ney Vianna |
| 1975 | 4th place | Grupo 1 | O Mundo Fantástico do Uirapurú | Arlindo Rodrigues |
| 1975 | 4th place | Grupo 1 | O Mundo Fantástico do Uirapurú | Ney Vianna |
| 1976 | 3rd place | Grupo 1 | Mãe Menininha do Gantois | Arlindo Rodrigues |
| 1976 | 3rd place | Grupo 1 | Mãe Menininha do Gantois | Ney Vianna |
| 1977 | 8th place | Grupo 1 | Samba Marca Registrada | Gugu Henrique |
| 1977 | 8th place | Grupo 1 | Samba Marca Registrada | Ney Vianna |
| 1978 | 3rd place | Grupo 1 | Brasiliana | Arlindo Rodrigues |
| 1978 | 3rd place | Grupo 1 | Brasiliana | Ney Vianna |
| 1979 | Champion | Grupo 1A | O Descobrimento do Brasil | Arlindo Rodrigues |
| 1979 | Champion | Grupo 1A | O Descobrimento do Brasil | Ney Vianna |
| 1980 | Vice Champion | Grupo 1A | Tropicália Maravilha | Fernando Pinto |
| 1980 | Vice Champion | Grupo 1A | Tropicália Maravilha | Ney Vianna |
| 1981 | 6th place | Grupo 1A | Abram Alas para a Folia, aí vem a Mocidade | Ecila Cirne; Edmundo Braga; Paulino Espírito Santo |
| 1981 | 6th place | Grupo 1A | Abram Alas para a Folia, aí vem a Mocidade | Ney Vianna |
| 1982 | 7th place | Grupo 1A | O Velho Chico | Maria Carmem de Souza |
| 1982 | 7th place | Grupo 1A | O Velho Chico | Ney Vianna |
| 1983 | 6th place | Grupo 1A | Como era Verde meu Xingu | Fernando Pinto |
| 1983 | 6th place | Grupo 1A | Como era Verde meu Xingu | Ney Vianna |
| 1984 | Vice Champion | Grupo 1A | Mamãe eu quero Manaus | Fernando Pinto |
| 1984 | Vice Champion | Grupo 1A | Mamãe eu quero Manaus | Aroldo Melodia |
| 1985 | Champion | Grupo 1A | Ziriguidum 2001, um carnaval nas estrelas | Fernando Pinto |
| 1985 | Champion | Grupo 1A | Ziriguidum 2001, um carnaval nas estrelas | Ney Vianna |
| 1986 | 7th place | Grupo 1A | Bruxarias e histórias do arco da velha | Edmundo Braga; Paulino Espírito Santo |
| 1986 | 7th place | Grupo 1A | Bruxarias e histórias do arco da velha | Ney Vianna |
| 1987 | Vice Champion | Grupo 1A | Tupinicópolis | Fernando Pinto |
| 1987 | Vice Champion | Grupo 1A | Tupinicópolis | Ney Vianna |
| 1988 | 8th place | Grupo 1 | Beijim, beijim, bye, bye Brasil | Fernando Pinto; Cláudio Peixoto |
| 1988 | 8th place | Grupo 1 | Beijim, beijim, bye, bye Brasil | Ney Vianna |
| 1989 | 7th place | Grupo 1 | Elis, um trem de emoções | Ely Peron; Rogério Figueiredo |
| 1989 | 7th place | Grupo 1 | Elis, um trem de emoções | Ney Vianna |
| 1990 | Champion | Grupo Especial | Vira, Virou, A Mocidade Chegou | Renato Lage; Lilian Rabelo |
| 1990 | Champion | Grupo Especial | Vira, Virou, A Mocidade Chegou | Paulinho Mocidade |
| 1991 | Champion | Grupo Especial | Chuê, Chuá, As águas vão rolar | Renato Lage; Lilian Rabelo |
| 1991 | Champion | Grupo Especial | Chuê, Chuá, As águas vão rolar | Paulinho Mocidade |
| 1992 | Vice Champion | Grupo Especial | Sonhar não custa nada, ou quase nada | Renato Lage; Lilian Rabelo |
| 1992 | Vice Champion | Grupo Especial | Sonhar não custa nada, ou quase nada | Paulinho Mocidade |
| 1993 | 4th place | Grupo Especial | Marraio feridô sou rei | Renato Lage |
| 1993 | 4th place | Grupo Especial | Marraio feridô sou rei | Paulinho Mocidade |
| 1994 | 8th place | Grupo Especial | Avenida Brasil – Tudo passa, quem não viu? | Renato Lage |
| 1994 | 8th place | Grupo Especial | Avenida Brasil – Tudo passa, quem não viu? | Wander Pires |
| 1995 | 4th place | Grupo Especial | Padre Miguel, olhai por nós | Renato Lage |
| 1995 | 4th place | Grupo Especial | Padre Miguel, olhai por nós | Wander Pires |
| 1996 | Champion | Grupo Especial | Criador e Criatura | Renato Lage |
| 1996 | Champion | Grupo Especial | Criador e Criatura | Wander Pires |
| 1997 | Vice Champion | Grupo Especial | De corpo e alma na avenida | Renato Lage |
| 1997 | Vice Champion | Grupo Especial | De corpo e alma na avenida | Wander Pires |
| 1998 | 6th place | Grupo Especial | Brilha no céu a estrela que me faz sonhar | Renato Lage |
| 1998 | 6th place | Grupo Especial | Brilha no céu a estrela que me faz sonhar | Wander Pires |
| 1999 | 4th place | Grupo Especial | Villa Lobos e a Apoteose Brasileira | Renato Lage |
| 1999 | 4th place | Grupo Especial | Villa Lobos e a Apoteose Brasileira | Wander Pires |
| 2000 | 4th place | Grupo Especial | Verde, amarelo, azul-anil, colorem o Brasil no ano 2000 | Renato Lage |
| 2000 | 4th place | Grupo Especial | Verde, amarelo, azul-anil, colorem o Brasil no ano 2000 | Paulo Henrique |
| 2001 | 7th place | Grupo Especial | Paz e harmonia, Mocidade é alegria | Renato Lage |
| 2001 | 7th place | Grupo Especial | Paz e harmonia, Mocidade é alegria | David do Pandeiro |
| 2002 | 4th place | Grupo Especial | O Grande Circo Místico | Renato Lage; Márcia Lage |
| 2002 | 4th place | Grupo Especial | O Grande Circo Místico | Wander Pires |
| 2003 | 5th place | Grupo Especial | Para sempre no seu coração – Carnaval da doação | Chico Spinoza |
| 2003 | 5th place | Grupo Especial | Para sempre no seu coração – Carnaval da doação | Paulinho Mocidade |
| 2004 | 8th place | Grupo Especial | Não Corra, Não Mate, Não Morra – Pegue Carona Com a Mocidade! Educação No Trânsito | Chico Spinoza |
| 2004 | 8th place | Grupo Especial | Não Corra, Não Mate, Não Morra – Pegue Carona Com a Mocidade! Educação No Trânsito | Paulinho Mocidade |
| 2005 | 9th place | Grupo Especial | Buon Mangiare, Mocidade! A Arte Está na Mesa | Paulo Menezes |
| 2005 | 9th place | Grupo Especial | Buon Mangiare, Mocidade! A Arte Está na Mesa | Roger Linhares |
| 2006 | 10th place | Grupo Especial | A Vida Que Pedi a Deus | Mauro Quintaes |
| 2006 | 10th place | Grupo Especial | A Vida Que Pedi a Deus | Wander Pires |
| 2007 | 11th place | Grupo Especial | O Futuro no Pretérito, Uma História Feita à Mão | Alex de Souza |
| 2007 | 11th place | Grupo Especial | O Futuro no Pretérito, Uma História Feita à Mão | Bruno Ribas |
| 2008 | 8th place | Grupo Especial | O Quinto Império: De Portugal ao Brasil, uma Utopia na História | Cid Carvalho |
| 2008 | 8th place | Grupo Especial | O Quinto Império: De Portugal ao Brasil, uma Utopia na História | Bruno Ribas |
| 2009 | 11th place | Grupo Especial | Mocidade apresenta: Clube Literário Machado de Assis e Guimarães Rosa, estrela em poesia! | Cebola |
| 2009 | 11th place | Grupo Especial | Mocidade apresenta: Clube Literário Machado de Assis e Guimarães Rosa, estrela em poesia! | Wander Pires |
| 2010 | 7th place | Grupo Especial | Do paraíso de Deus ao paraíso da loucura, cada um sabe o que procura | Cid Carvalho |
| 2010 | 7th place | Grupo Especial | Do paraíso de Deus ao paraíso da loucura, cada um sabe o que procura | David do Pandeiro; Nêgo |
| 2011 | 7th place | Grupo Especial | Parábola dos Divinos Semeadores | |
| 2011 | 7th place | Grupo Especial | Parábola dos Divinos Semeadores | Nêgo; Rixxah |
| 2012 | 9th place | Grupo Especial | Por Ti, Portinari, Rompendo a Tela, a Realidade | Alexandre Louzada |
| 2012 | 9th place | Grupo Especial | Por Ti, Portinari, Rompendo a Tela, a Realidade | Luizinho Andanças |
| 2013 | 11th place | Grupo Especial | Eu vou de Mocidade com samba e Rock in Rio, por um mundo melhor | Alexandre Louzada |
| 2013 | 11th place | Grupo Especial | Eu vou de Mocidade com samba e Rock in Rio, por um mundo melhor | Luizinho Andanças |
| 2014 | 9th place | Grupo Especial | Pernambucópolis | Paulo Menezes |
| 2014 | 9th place | Grupo Especial | Pernambucópolis | Bruno Ribas; Dudu Nobre |
| 2015 | 7th place | Grupo Especial | Se o mundo fosse acabar, me diz o que você faria se só lhe restasse um dia? | Paulo Barros |
| 2015 | 7th place | Grupo Especial | Se o mundo fosse acabar, me diz o que você faria se só lhe restasse um dia? | Bruno Ribas |
| 2016 | 10th place | Grupo Especial | O Brasil de La Mancha - Sou Miguel, Padre Miguel. Sou Cervantes, Sou Quixote Cavaleiro, Pixote Brasileiro | Alexandre Louzada; Edson Pereira |
| 2016 | 10th place | Grupo Especial | O Brasil de La Mancha - Sou Miguel, Padre Miguel. Sou Cervantes, Sou Quixote Cavaleiro, Pixote Brasileiro | Bruno Ribas |
| 2017 | Champion | Grupo Especial | As mil e uma noites de uma 'Mocidade' pra lá de Marrakech | Alexandre Louzada |
| 2017 | Champion | Grupo Especial | As mil e uma noites de uma 'Mocidade' pra lá de Marrakech | Wander Pires |
| 2018 | 6th place | Grupo Especial | Namastê: a Estrela que habita em mim, saúda a que existe em você | Alexandre Louzada |
| 2018 | 6th place | Grupo Especial | Namastê: a Estrela que habita em mim, saúda a que existe em você | Wander Pires |
| 2019 | 6th place | Grupo Especial | Eu sou o Tempo. Tempo é Vida | Alexandre Louzada |
| 2019 | 6th place | Grupo Especial | Eu sou o Tempo. Tempo é Vida | Wander Pires |
| 2020 | 3rd place | Grupo Especial | Elza Deusa Soares | Jack Vasconcelos |
| 2020 | 3rd place | Grupo Especial | Elza Deusa Soares | Wander Pires |
| 2022 | 8th place | Grupo Especial | Batuque ao Caçador | Fábio Ricardo |
| 2022 | 8th place | Grupo Especial | Batuque ao Caçador | Wander Pires |
| 2023 | 11th place | Grupo Especial | Terra de Meu Céu, Estrelas de Meu Chão | Marcus Ferreira |
| 2023 | 11th place | Grupo Especial | Terra de Meu Céu, Estrelas de Meu Chão | Nino do Milênio |
| 2024 | | Grupo Especial | Pede Caju que dou... Pé de Caju que dá! | Marcus Ferreira |
| 2024 | | Grupo Especial | Pede Caju que dou... Pé de Caju que dá! | Zé Paulo Sierra |

== The Independents of Padre Miguel ==
- Andrezinho
- Castor de Andrade
- Dudu Nobre
- Lucinha Nobre
- Marcos Palmeira
- Mestre André
- Paulinho Mocidade
- Tôco
- Regina Casé
- Carlos Alberto Parreira
- Elza Soares
- Rodrigo Santoro
- Leandro Hassum
- Monique Evans
- Oswaldo de Oliveira
- Dill Costa

== Performers of the school ==
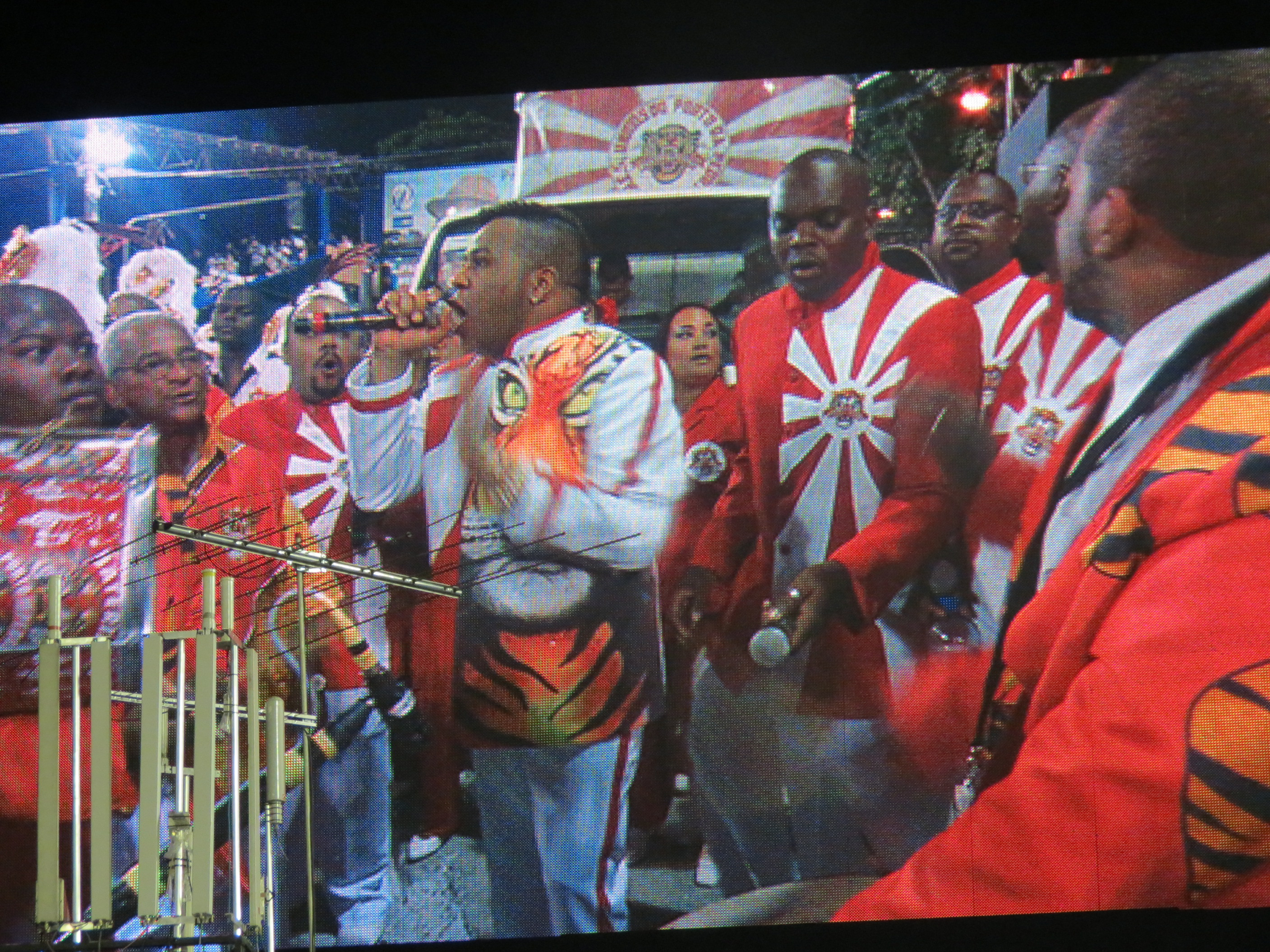
Wander Pires, creates youth minister and one of the icons of singers of samba school.

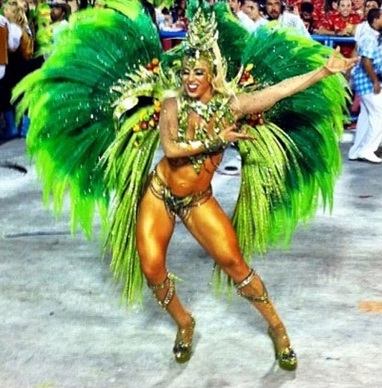
Andrea de Andrade former-wife patron's Rogério Andrade that it was battery queen, in the years of 2010 and 2011.

- Arlindo Rodrigues
- Andrea de Andrade
- Claudia Leitte

== Premiation Titles ==
- Special Group: 1979, 1985, 1990, 1991, 1996 and 2017 (co-general champion)
- Gold Standard (best school): 1983, 1991 and 1999
- Standard Award (best drum kit): 1974, 1976, 1991, 1992, 2001 and 2018.
