= Banda Uó =

Brazilian tecnobrega band

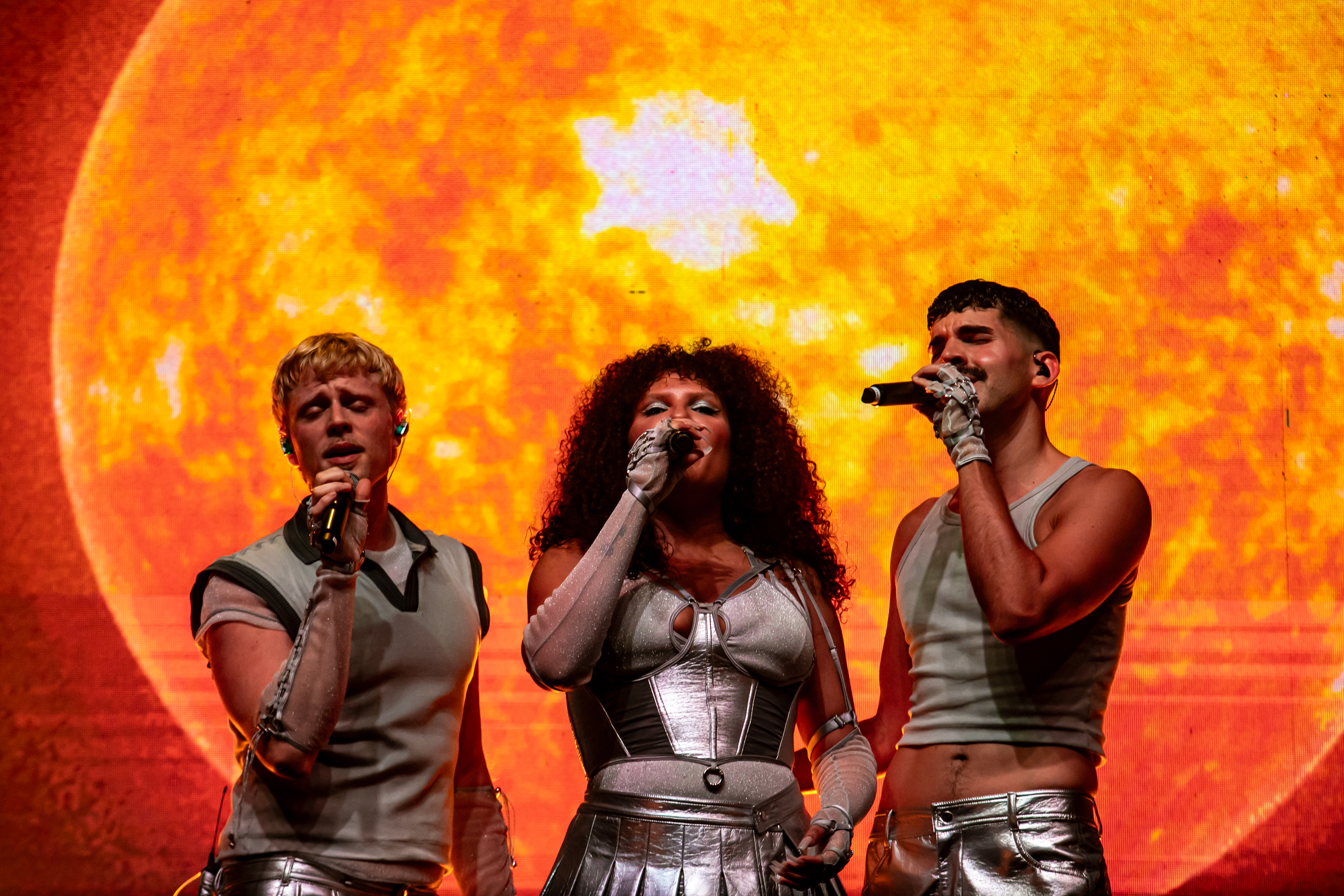
- From left to right: Davi Sabbag, Candy Mel and Mateus Carrilho

Background information
- Origin: Goiânia, Brazil
- Genres: Pop, tecnobrega
- Years active: 2010-2018 (indefinite hiatus)
- Label: Deckdisc
- Members: Davi Sabbag; Mateus Carrilho; Candy Mel
- Past members: Flora Maria
- Website: bandauo.tumblr.com

Banda Uó was a Brazilian tecnobrega band composed of Davi Sabbag, Mateus Carrilho, and Candy Mel. The band was formed in 2010 in Goiânia. The group was initially composed of Davi Sabbag, Mateus Carrilho and Flora Maria. They released their first music video, a tecnobrega cover of Katy Perry's "Teenage Dream", called "Não Quero Saber", with help from students of Universidade Federal de Goiás and PUC Goiás.

The funny lyrics and Sabbag's direction got the attention of DJ Diplo, who was responsible for introducing funk carioca to the world. Besides this, Flora Maria left the group and Mel Gonçalves, also known as Candy Mel, joined the group, the three started to work in others versions, releasing the extended play "Me Emoldurei de Presente Pra Te Ter".

They released another cover–this time of Willow Smith's "Whip My Hair", called "Shake de Amor". The music video won the 2011 MTV Brazil Music Video Awards, bringing the group to nationwide prominence.

In 2012, Banda Uó released their debut album Motel through Deckdisc. They received good reviews from Rolling Stone Brasil: "One of the triumphs of Banda Uó was to realize that being humorous is not necessarily related to "funny" music - and that the trio secured an audience even wider."

== Background ==
=== 2010: Beginning ===
During a trip to Pirenópolis, Goiás, Davi Sabbag and Mateus Carrilho set up the band Folk Heart. The project was uploaded to YouTube as a "joke". With Folk Heart, they performed on some festivals in Goiás attracting public attention. David, Mateus and Candy Mel met in adolescence during parties in Goiânia's nights.

The three decided to create a trio to promote a party called "Uó," where David was the manager and promoter. With inspiration from DJ Cremoso, who was a precursor for mixing tecnobrega with pop music, they recorded a cover version with samples of Katy Perry's "Teenage Dream" called "Eu Não Quero Saber." Mel Gonçalves wasn't able to attend recording sessions, being replaced by Flora Maria. After they recorded three more songs due to the success of the song. According to David, it was at that moment that he thought the band could work.

The video ended up attracting attention of DJ Diplo, who was one of the responsible for introducing funk carioca to the world. Pedro D'Eyrot and Rodrigo Gorky, both from group "Bonde do Rolê," were responsible for the production of their songs and together with Diplo, they became the band's managers. At that moment, Mel Gonçalves returned to the group.

=== 2011: First release and EP ===
Candy Mel had to leave her fashion college to move along with the band to São Paulo. Although David and Mateus were boyfriends, after fighting in a trip, they decided to remain in the band. They were living with a "rich friend" for six months, they describe.

The band eventually released the music video for "Shake de Amor," a cover of Willow Smith's Whip My Hair, which ended up winning "Best Music Video" at the 2011 MTV Video Music Brasil (VMBs).

The extended play Me Emoldurei de Presente Pra Te Ter was released in July 2011 through Tropical Avalanche. The EP contains five tracks. A video for "O Gosto Amargo do Perfume" was also released, a cover of Two Door Cinema Club's Something Good Can Work. The band signed with Deckdisc in 2011, according to Mateus: "Deck[disc] is a very open label. We are working with a lot of freedom, our concern was exactly this..."

In March 2011, they performed "Shake de Amor" on Esquenta! of Rede Globo. According to the band, the theme addressed by the program, on Candy Mel's transsexuality, was not disclosed to them in advance, causing embarrassment to the singer.

The band's debut album, Motel was released on September 7, 2012 through Deckdisc. On release day, the album peaked at number one Brazilian iTunes. Rolling Stone Brazil rated the album 4 out of 5 stars and ranked it 9th in their "best albums of the year" list. It spawned four singles: "Faz Uó", "Gringo", "Cowboy" and "Búzios do Coração". "Cowboy" was released as EP with the original version, two remixed versions (Sabbag's Tacinha Remix and Vibe Remix) and " Sexy Sem Ser Vulgar (We Don't Fucking Care)," recorded for the 2013 Fall-Winter campaign of the brand Sergio K.

=== 2014: Batalha dos Quiosques and first DVD ===
On January 7, 2014, MTV Brazil broadcast "Batalha dos Quiosques," a weekly program where two bands competed administrating kiosks on the beach. In the end, Banda Uó became the winner of the program with the prize being recording a song. The production eventually became "Catraca", released on March 27, 2014, featuring famous funk singer and Brazilian rapper Mr. Catra. The music video was released on April 7, 2014, directed by Cristina Streciwik.

On November 5, 2014, the band announced on social networks the release of the DVD Turnê Motel - ao Vivo no Cine Jóia. One of the concerts was previously broadcast on Multishow on October 3, 2013. The DVD was released on November 25, 2014. "Faz Uó", "Cowboy", "Gringo", "I <3 Cafuçu", "Vânia" and the hit song "Shake de Amor" are on the setlist. Preta Gil, was featured on "Nêga Samurai" and "Sou Como Sou".

=== 2015: Veneno ===
In May 2015, Rede Globo announced that "Catraca" would be part of the soundtrack of the telenovela I Love Paraisópolis. They guest starred on the first chapter as themselves, and the song came to be one of the most sought after on Brazilian iTunes.

In an interview, they confirmed the second studio album was in development. Mateus Carrilho said that the album "will be more pop and less brega, also focusing on other audiences using with different beats." Matheus described that he wanted black singers with strong and perfect voices, so they called Karol Conká and Vanessa Jackson to be featured on the album.

The lead single from Veneno, "É da Rádio", was released on August 11, 2015. They also announced the cover art and tracklist containing thirteen songs.

=== 2017: Break announcement ===
In October 2017, the band announced they are taking a break to focus on their solo careers. They released a farewell track titled "Tô Na Rua" in December 2017, accompanied by a music video.

== Discography ==
=== Studio albums ===
Title	Details
Motel	Release date: September 6, 2012; Label: Deckdisc; Formats: CD, digital download
Veneno	Release date: September 4, 2015; Label: Deckdisc; Formats: CD, digital download

=== Extended plays ===
Title	Details
Me Emoldurei de Presente Pra Te Ter	Release date: July 1, 2011; Label: Avalanche Tropical; Formats: digital download

=== Video albums ===
Title	Details
Turnê Motel - Ao Vivo no Cine Joia	Release date: November 25, 2014; Label: Deckdisc; Formats: DVD, digital download

=== Singles ===
Song	Year	Album
"Faz Uó"	2012	Motel
"Gringo"	2013	Motel
"Cowboy"	2013	Motel
"Búzios do Coração"	2014	Motel
"Catraca" (featuring Mr. Catra)	2014	Veneno
"É da Rádio?"	2015	Veneno
"Dá1LIKE" (featuring Karol Conká)	2015	Veneno
"Arregaçada"	2016	Veneno
"Cremosa"	2016	Veneno

== Videography ==
Title	Year	Director(s)
"Não Quero Saber"	2010	Mateus Carrilho
"Shake de Amor"	2011	Mateus Carrilho
"Gosto Amargo do Perfume"	2011	Mateus Carrilho
"Rosa"	2011	Mateus Carrilho
"Faz Uó"	2012	Mateus Carrilho
"Gringo"	2013	Arthur Warren, Gustavo Suzuki
"Cowboy"	2013	Mateus Carrilho
"Catraca" (featuring Mr. Catra)	2014	Cristina Streciwik
"Búzios do Coração"	2014	Daniel Alfaya
"É da Rádio?"	2015	Mateus Carrilho, Cristina Streciwik, Rabih Aidar, Vecks
"Dá1LIKE" (featuring Karol Conká)	2015	Rudá Cabral, Cristina Streciwik
"Cremosa"	2015	Cristina Streciwik
"Arregaçada"	2016	Rabih Aidar

== Tours ==
- Turnê Motel (2012)
- Turnê Veneno (2015)

== Members ==
- Davi Sabbag
- Mateus Carrilho
- Candy Mel
- Flora Maria - (2010-2011)

== Awards and nominations ==
Year	Award	Recipient	Category	Result	Ref.
2011	MTV Video Music Brasil	Shake de Amor	Best Music Video	Won	
2012	Prêmio Multishow de Música Brasileira	Rosa (Last Night)	Versão do Ano	Nominated	
