= Mulamba (album) =

Studio album by Mulamba
- Released: November 2, 2018 (digital edition); November 10, 2018 (physical edition)
- Recorded: 2018
- Genres: Rock, MPB
- Length: 39:29
- Language: Portuguese
- Label: Máquina Discos
- Producer: Érica Silva

Singles from Mulamba
- 1. "P.U.T.A." Released: 2016; 2. "Desses Nadas" Released: October 2018

Mulamba is the debut album by the Brazilian band of same name, released on 2 November 2018. It was recorded at a Red Bull studio in São Paulo, following the band's winning of the Vento Festival contest in which the winner would earn a slot at the event and the production of an album at the aforementioned studio.

== Song information ==
The title track discusses "the massacre against female gender and everything it represents". It was the first song they composed together, back when they were still a Cássia Eller tribute act, and its creation was inspired specifically by a harassment incident involving a friend of theirs in one of their shows. The track wasn't re-recorded for the album, but it was remixed and remastered by producer Fruet. The video involved interactions with other women, and the session was organized and supervised by a psychologist. The video features a main character played by Nayara Santos which represents the "mulamba" image. She destroys symbolic objects as in a liberation process while wearing a uterus-shaped mask. According to director Virginia de Ferrante, the character is the personification of the interior strength that all women possess in order to face their hardships.

"Espia, Escuta" was created around choruses that the band used during their shows and also improvisations they did with political funk songs. It was re-released on 30 April 2020, remixed by DJ BadSista.

"Desses Nadas" speaks about a relationship between two women, however without fetishizing it, and it was released as a single in October 2018. The song received a clp with a couple played by Bruna Barreto and Jenifer Coimbra.

"Provável Canção de Amor para Estimada Natália", composed during one night, is a tribute to the band's former guitarist, lawyer Nat Fragoso. Vocalist Amanda Pacífico sees elements of pop, folk and jazz on the song. A video was created by directors Couple of Things; it features child actress Cecília Alvarenga performing alongside acquaintances of the band, including Fragoso herself.

"Interestelar" was born out of a remark made by vocalist Cacau de Sá to relatives of hers and a particular friend about the way they saw children. "Tereshkova" was created out of sections that would originally be used on "Interestelar" and it is named after Valentina Tereshkova, the first woman in space,

"Lama" talks about the Mariana dam disaster and its consequences. It had to be re-recorded several times until the band was satisfied with it. Pacífico wrote the track after watching a news story about the incident which featured a frustrated woman commenting on how the disaster contaminated the local waters and caused her children to be sick.

"Vila Vintém" discusses police brutality during a raid at the favela of same name in Rio de Janeiro and its video features images captured at the 29 de Março Occupation in Curitiba. The idea, according to lyricist Sá, was "to bring attention to the lives of people who live in these places and who are sort of secretly subjected to evictions, fires, lack of sanitation, electricity, among so many other problems. (...) The question I ask myself is if the communities are indeed noticed by society and by the state as something other than a problem to get rid of."

"P.U.T.A." is considered the band's breakthrough song, due to its video which went viral. It was re-recorded for the album with guest vocals from Juliana Strassacapa (Francisco, el Hombre). In order to write the song, Pacífico drew some inspiration from a friend's text on Facebook, in which she expressed fear of being attacked when exiting the bus. The purpose was to discuss the fear and powerlessness women feel on the streets. Sá and Pacífico recorded their parts simultaneously, but in separate rooms.

== Track listing ==
No.	Title	Writer(s)	Length
1.	"Mulamba" (Skunk)	Amanda Pacífico / Cacau de Sá	4:08
2.	"Espia Escuta" (Spy, Listen)	Cacau de Sá	2:48
3.	"Desses Nadas" (Of These Nothings (feat. Lio Soares))	Amanda Pacífico	4:00
4.	"Provável Canção de Amor Para Estimada Natália" (Probable Love Song for Esteemed Natália)	Amanda Pacífico	4:52
5.	"Interestelar" (Interstellar)	Cacau de Sá	4:41
6.	"Tereshkova"	Érica Silva	3:04
7.	"Lama" (Mud)	Amanda Pacífico	5:46
8.	"Vila Vintém"	Cacau de Sá	5:06
9.	"P.U.T.A."	Amanda Pacífico / Cacau de Sá	5:04
39.	Untitled (W.H.O.R.E. (feat. Juliana Strassacapa))
Total length:			49:29

== Reception ==
The Associação Paulista de Críticos de Arte considered the album one of the 25 best albums of the second half of 2018. Website Tenho Mais Discos Que Amigos! elected it the best Brazilian album of 2018.

== Personnel ==
Credits adapted from the band's official channel on YouTube:

=== Mulamba ===
- Amanda Pacífico — lead vocals on all tracks
- Cacau de Sá — lead vocals on all tracks except "Tereshkova"
- Érica Silva — vocals on "Provável Canção de Amor Para Estimada Natália" and "Lama"; guitar on "Interestelar", "Tereshkova" and "Lama"; acoustic guitar on "Desses Nadas" and "Provável Canção de Amor Para Estimada Natália"; bass on "Espia, Escuta" and "P.U.T.A.", percussion on "Espia, Escuta"
- Naíra Debértolis — guitar on "Espia, Escuta", "Vila Vintém" and "P.U.T.A."; acoustic guitar on "Lama"; bass on "Mulamba", "Desses Nadas", "Provável Canção de Amor Para Estimada Natália", "Interestelar", "Tereshkova" and "Vila Vintém"
- Caro Pisco — drums on all tracks; editing of introduction of "Lama"
- Fernanda Koppe — cello on all tracks

=== Guest performances ===
- Agnes Ignácio — introduction on "Interestelar"
- Jéssica Caetano — introduction on "P.U.T.A."
- Lio Soares — co-lead vocals on "Desses Nadas"
- Juliana Strassacapa — co-lead vocals on "P.U.T.A."
- Natália Fragoso — guitar on "Mulamba"
- Pri Link — percussion on "Mulamba", "Espia, Escuta", "Desses Nadas", "Provável Canção de Amor Para Estimada Natália" and "Lama"
- Catarina Schmitt — viola on all tracks except "Mulamba" and "Espia, Escuta"
- Joe Caetano — castanets on "Desses Nadas"
- Luisa Toller — accordion on "Desses Nadas" and "Vila Vintém"; piano on "Desses Nadas", "Provável Canção de Amor Para Estimada Natália", "Interestelar", "Vila Vintém" and "P.U.T.A."; synthesizer on "P.U.T.A."
- Desirée Marantes — effects on "Tereshkova" and "P.U.T.A."

=== Technical personnel ===
- Érica Silva — production
- Vitor Pinheiro — mixing and mastering at Estúdio Gramofone
- Du Gomide — production and audio capture on "Mulamba"
- Marcelo Fruet and Átila Viana — mixing and post-production at Estúdio 12 Experiência Sonora on "Mulamba"
- Marcos Abreu — mastering on "Mulamba"
- Rodrigo "Funai" Costa, Alejandra Luciani and Eric Yoshino — recording at Red Bull Studio
- Vinicius Braganholo — recording of Lio Soares at Nico's Studio
- Alexandre Capilé —recording of Juliana Strassacapa at Estúdio Costella
- Cristiano Montalvão — recording of Jéssica Caitano's text at Estúdio Seu Mulica Records
- Daniel Amaral — recording of Agnes Ignácio's text at Estúdio Dani Records
- Katia Horn — cover
