= Andrea de Andrade =

Brazilian Carnival Queen

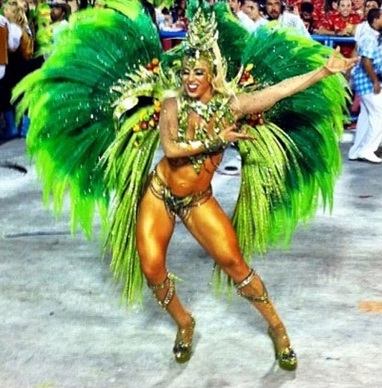
- Andrea de Andrade, muse of the Vila Isabel at Rio Carnival 2013, Brazil
- Born: Andrea de Andrade; Rio de Janeiro
- Occupation: Comedian
- Years active: 2009-present
- Known for: Pânico na TV cast member

Andrea de Andrade is a Brazilian Carnival Queen. She began performing in samba parades in 2006 with Mocidade, a samba school in Rio de Janeiro. In 2010 she won the "Rainha da bateria" (Queen of drums) of Mocidade and in 2011 led the parade of this school at the Rio de Janeiro carnival.

In 2012 Andrade left Mocidade Independente de Padre Miguel and begin a new fulminate ascension in his career with the highest degree for a samba dancer: "madrinha" of a drums battery. A queen is chosen for an entire year. In the history of samba are few madrinhas: Monique Evans, Chris, Alves, Beth Carvalho and Luma Oliveira. Andrade received this title after just one year of parade. In 2012 and 2013, Andrade was madrinha for Imperio de Casa Verde and principal musa for Vila Isabel. The two parades were conducted two days apart in two different sambadromes (Rio de Janeiro and São Paulo).

Despite her career of only three years, she attained the highest ranks of samba skills. In an interview for EGO, Andrea announced that after the 2013 parades she would withdraw from Imperio de Casa Verde and from GRES Unidos de Vila Isabel to dedicate more time to raising her son Rinhaldino. She did not rule out a return in the future.

== 2011: Mocidade ==
On 20 November 2010 she was crowned "The Queen of drums battery", a high degree of performance in samba dance. Mocidade Independente de Padre Miguel has presented on 08.03.2011 at Rio Carnival a parade on theme "Parábola dos Divinos Semeadores"("Parable of Divine Planters")-Compositores:J. Giovanni, Zé Glória e Hugo Reis . The main Brazilian TV networks Rede Globo, RBS TV and radio station Universo Online was presented in detail the entire parade of Mocidade. Also, the web sites G1 Globo, EGO, Estadao Br, The Telegraph, presented in their page description and images about this event. The 2011 theme of the outfit of battery was the faun. One specific element of Mocidade battery is "paradinhas" which was introduced for the first time in history of samba parade in 1959 under the expert Master André. Paradinha means the moment when the drummers stop playing for some time during which the singers (samba-enredo) continue the song by maintaining the same rhythm. The Master of 2011 battery was Mestre Bereco which for diversity made a lot of paradinhas. The numbers of drummers and percutionists of battery is 280 and name "Não Existe Mais Quente," (There is None Hotter). The drummers were led by "Rainha da batteria" (Queen of battery) Andrea de Andrade which present in this parade an ancient nymph. Fantasia of Andrea was composed by 80000 Swarovski crystal,700 pheasant feather into a mixture of white and pink colors, and was evaluate at 65000 BR R$ (approx. US$29000). All parade time length was 1 hour and 21 minutes in conformity with official chronometers. On 04.07.2011 the Mocidade Independente de Padre Miguel inaugurate the opening of a new facility of training for samba repetition, a superblock with capacity for 10 000 revelers. The area of 40 000 m^{2} will have 16 bars, four dressing rooms and 30 cabins. It will be located on Avenida Brazil between neighborhoods Padre Miguel and Bangu, in the suburb of Rio. After departing in 2011 from Mocidade, on interview for Extra.Globo, the ex-Queen of battery speak about the future possibility of returning, that she would accept with pleasure:" Being Queen battery of Mocidade was very important to me. The battery is the heart of the school, it is something wonderful. But Carnival is thus: one year you're there and the next you're here".

== 2012: Vila Isabel and Império de Casa Verde ==
Next year, in 2012, Andrea de Andrade was invited to collaborate with another famous school of samba Unidos de Vila Isabel Rio de Janeiro like one of the principal musa of parade: "Dama da corte de Rainha de Njinga"-in translate "Lady of the court of Queen Njinga".The theme of parade was the Angola and his Queen Nzinga of Ndongo and Matamba (1583–1663), one of the great leaders of Africans. The announce of participation of Andrea de Andrade like principal on the seven muse which participate in the parade was made in 18.01.2012. The parade have place in 20.02.2012 and was transmitted by Rede Globo, RBS TV, RJ TV, and in magazines like Oglobo appear the chronic of the event. The Unidos de Vila Isabel won the "Estandarte de Ouro " (Golden Flag) for best samba school carnival 2012, with the theme “Você Semba Lá... Que Eu Sambo Cá. O Canto Livre de Angola!” ("You semba there… I sambo here. The free song of Angola!").

- Allegoria no. 3 named "In the court of Queen Njinga" led by Andrea de Andrade was a large float preceded by a numerous group of guarding Africans warriors (ward no. 10).Fantasia of the muse Andrea was named "Dama da Corte da Rainha Njinga" and was a mixture of orange and brown colors of Swarovski and feather.

The costume was created by well known fashion stylist Marcio Carvalho and coiffure by Diego Hassan. The length time of parade was 1 hour and 15 minutes.

Concomitant with the Rio "avenida", another job are waiting for Andrea in 2012."Madrinha da bateria da Império de Casa Verde" one of the famous school of samba from São Paulo."Madrinha" in Portuguese means "Godmother" of bateria, on degree highest that "rainha". The parade held on 18.02.2012 during 64 minutes was reflected on Rede Globo network, UOL network, Terra network. The theme of parade was “In the optics of my empire the focus is on you”. The Imperio de Casa Verde was telling the history of the science of optics using big floats and specific costumes. The components of parade was 26 of wards, five floats and 3500 components. Samba-enredo was "E o amor". Comissão de frente was depicted the theme of "Alquimistas" (Alchemist), scholars who begin the optics studies for the first time in history of science. They was called wizard by (not proved until now) them skills to transmutation of the metals in gold. On 09.12.2012 Andrea de Andrade was announced like "Madrinha de Bateria da Império de Casa Verde" by board director of school samba. Fantasia used by madrinha Andrea at parade was in blue, black and white swarovski and 1100 pheasant feathers. The costume was created by Marcio Carvalho and hairdressing by Diego Hassan.

== 2013: Vila Isabel and Império de Casa Verde ==
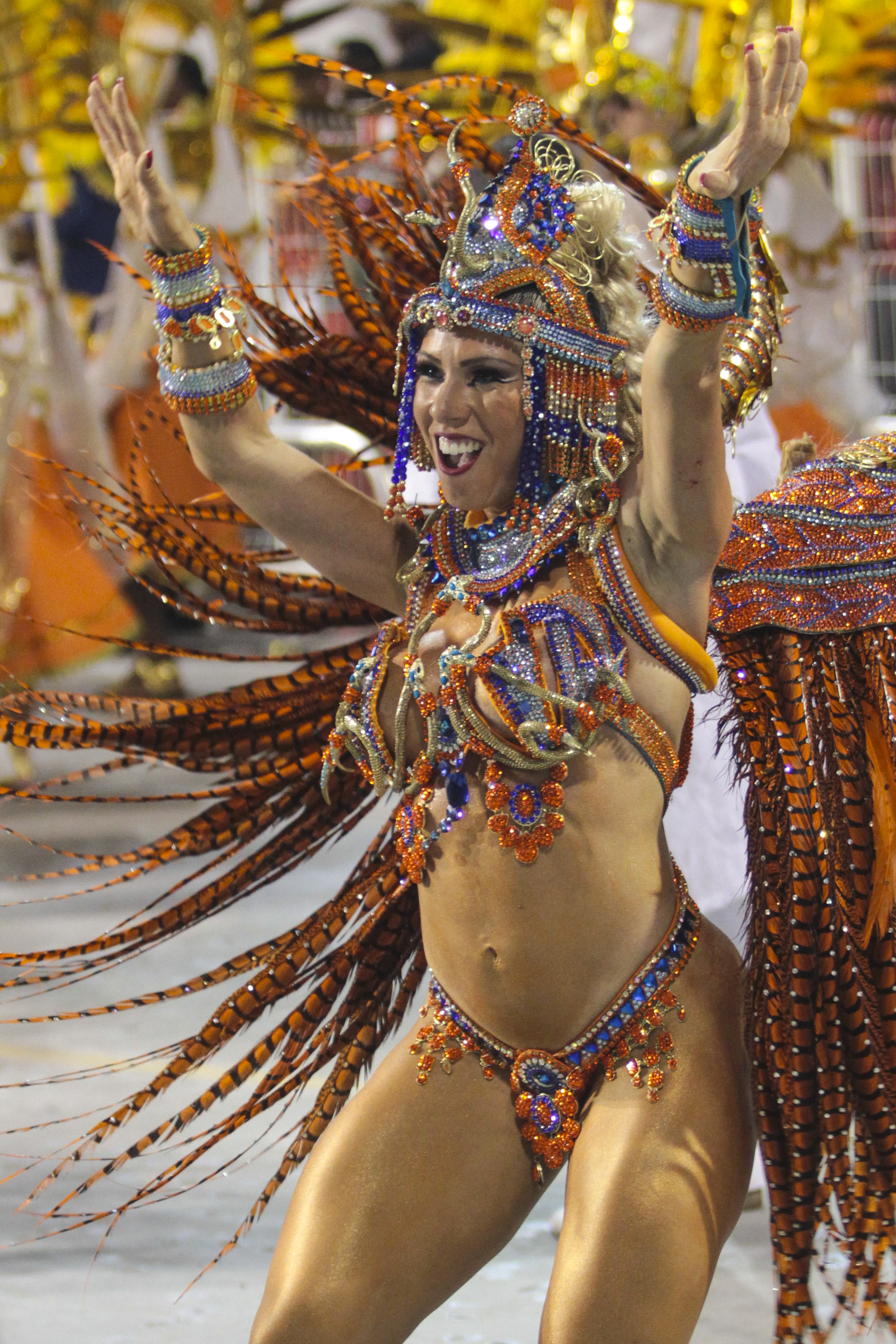
Andrea de Andrade, Madrinha de Imperio de Casa Verde, on São Paulo Carnival, Brazil, 2013

Unidos de Vila Isabel samba school has invited her to be the muse of agriculture. The parade held on 11.02.2013 during 1 hour and 25 minutes placed the samba school on the first place on the Grupo Especial of Rio de Janeiro ranking. Samba-enredo was "A Vila canta o Brasil, celeiro do mundo - Água no feijão que chegou mais um" ("Vila sing Brazil, the world's breadbasket - Water in beans that came another).The structure of parade was 31 of wards and 3700 components. "Comisao da frente" depicted the importance of the crates for transport the wealth from the countryside to the city.

- Float number 6 led by Andrea de Andrade like muse of agriculture represent the joy of returning on farm after of hard day of earth working. Procession, parties, tidbits illustrated this joy.G1globo labeled Andrea de Andrade like "Supermusas do carnival"(The best muse of carnival).

Andrea Andrade wear a fantasia on green and yellow colors, with svarovski, pheasant feather. The outfit was provided by Marcio Carvalho and hair style by Diego Hassan.

In 2013 she parade again with Imperio de Casa Verde like "madrinha da bateria". The parade held at Anhembi at São Paulo on 09.02.2012 during 65 minutes. The theme of parade was the history of medicine science from ancient Egypt and China until modern times. Samba-enredo "Quem canta seus males espanta – pra todo mal, a cura" (The songs, scaring the evil, heal the body).The north carioca samba school show on avenida 5 floats, 27 wards,3000 of components and a battery of 280 of drummers depicting vary domain of history of medicine. Like Comisario a frente was depicted a big tree of life representing the searching on the nature for healing remedies. The parade of Imperio de Casa Verde was included in "Grupo Especial" by carnival officials. The battery represented Egypt, with the quest for eternal life by technique of embalming the corps for mummification. The fantasia of Andrea de Andrade was inspired by Queen Cleopatra of Egypt, estimated at 80000 R$ (38000 usd) was created by red, orange and golden Swarovski and 700 of pheasant feathers. The outfit was provided by Marcio Carvalho and hair style by Diego Hassan.
