= Motel (Banda Uó album) =

Studio album by Banda Uó
- Released: September 6, 2012
- Recorded: 2011–2012
- Genre: Tecnobrega; pop
- Length: 41:36
- Label: Deckdisc
- Producer: Bonde do Rolê (exec.); Davi Sabbag; Diplo; Mumdance; Hugo Douster

Banda Uó chronology
Me Emoldurei de Presente Pra Te Ter (2011)	Motel (2012)	Veneno (2015)

Singles from Motel
- 1. "Faz Uó" Released: August 8, 2012; 2. "Gringo" Released: January 17, 2013; 3. "Cowboy" Released: June 27, 2013; 4. "Búzios do Coração" Released: October 9, 2014

Motel is the debut studio album of Brazilian band Banda Uó, released on September 6, 2012 by Deckdisc. The album features Douster in "Malandro," Mumdance in "Cavalo de Fogo," DJ Diplo in "Gringo" and Preta Gil in "Nega Samurai." It contains mainly tecnobrega songs but displays influences from sertanejo, axé music, twerk, electro music and pop. On release day, Motel reached the top spot on Brazilian iTunes Store.

"Faz Uó" is the lead single, released on July 17, 2012. "Gringo" was the second single, produced by American DJ Diplo and made references to twerk. "Cowboy" and "Buzios do Coração" were subsequently announced as the third and fourth singles. Rolling Stone Brazil ranked the album with 4/5 stars and placed it at number 9 on their "10 best albums of 2012" list.

== Track listing ==
No.	Title	Writer(s)	Length
1.	"Faz Uó"	Davi Sabbag · Pedro D'eyrot · Rodrigo Gorky · Mateus Carrilho · Mel Gonçalves	3:01
2.	"Búzios do Coração"	Sabbag	3:20
3.	"Castelo de Areias"	Sabbag · Carrilho · Gonçalves	2:54
4.	"Vânia"	Sabbag · Carrilho	3:33
5.	"Gringo"	Sabbag · Carrilho · Gonçalves · Rodrigo Curado · D'eyrot	3:03
6.	"Cowboy"	Sabbag · Carrilho	3:57
7.	"Malandro"	Sabbag · Carrilho	3:25
8.	"Nêga Samurai" (featuring Preta Gil)	Sabbag · Carrilho · Gonçalves · Gorky · D'eyrot	3:14
9.	"I <3 Cafuçú"	Sabbag · Carrilho · Gonçalves	3:05
10.	"Cavalo de Fogo"	Sabbag · Carrilho	3:15
11.	"Show da Rita"	Sabbag · Carrilho · Gonçalves · D'eyrot	3:46
12.	"Chorei"	Sabbag · Carrilho · D'eyrot	3:43
13.	"Shake de Amor"	Sabbag · Carrilho	3:20
Total length:			41:36

- "Shake de Amor" contains samples of "Whip My Hair," written by Ronald Jackson and Janae Rockwell and performed by Willow Smith.
