= Miguel de Santa Maria Mochon =

Miguel Santa Maria Mochon, better known as Padre Miguel, (Dílar, September 8, 1879 – Rio de Janeiro, March 19, 1947) was a Spanish Catholic priest, whose name was given to the Rio de Janeiro neighborhood of Padre Miguel.

Born in the village of Granada came to Brazil in 1888. Four years later, fatherless, was under the care of Vincentian priests. He studied at the Salesian College in Niterói by 1898, when he began his training in seminar of Long River. Later, he was sent by Cardinal Arcoverde to France.

Back in Rio de Janeiro, he completed the renovation of the church of Nossa Senhora da Conceição, which was named vicar in 1910. Created the first regular school in the region of Realengo. He also worked at the mills catechizing of N. Sra. Da Conceição da Pavuna and Botafogo Farm, treading the path that became known as Way of the Father.

He was also a pioneer of film exhibition in Rio de Janeiro, converting his home into a small cinema.

He died in 1947 and was buried in the church of Nossa Senhora da Conceição. His name was given to the train station formerly known as Moça Bonita.
