= Vila Vintém =

Coordinates: 22°52′S 43°27′W

- Urban low-income community
- Location within Brazil
- Country: Brazil
- State: Rio de Janeiro
- City: Rio de Janeiro
- Zone: West Zone
- Neighbourhoods: Realengo, Padre Miguel
- Time zone: UTC−3 (BRT)

Vila Vintém is an urban low income living community located between the neighbourhoods of Realengo and Padre Miguel, in the West Zone of the city of Rio de Janeiro. Situated on the borders of the railroad, it shelters the headquarters of Mocidade Independente de Padre Miguel and also Unidos de Padre Miguel, as well as many of their components. Its principal road is called Rua Belisário de Souza, that goes from the ensemble of IAPI, in Padre Miguel, until Realengo.

== History ==
The area where, nowadays, Vila Vintém is located, once belonged to the Army. The first residents needed to ask permission from the militants to build their houses, that were, almost always, of stucco and sapê (General name for diverse grassy plants, normally used on the covering of cabins or on rustic houses). There were nor sewers neither lights - instead they used drains, candles, and torches. The stoves were made of firewood and there were only some “collective water pipes”, where residents would get water with tins.

In 1939 the railway station of Moça Bonita was built, where before stood only a little stop of the train at the railway. The workers of the railway station began to populate Vila Vintém.

The workers that built the apartments situated in Marechal Falcão da Frota Street also came to live in the community, that grew each time more. There was little commerce, only some grocery stores and a coal-pit; the light came until the residents' association where it was distributed to the whole community. The basic sanitation (piped water and sewerage system) came in the government of Carlos Lacerda.

In the 1950s, the railroad station of Moça Bonita became called "Padre Miguel" (that later became the name of the neighborhood), to homage the priest Miguel de Santa Maria Mochon, that dedicated all his life to the church Igreja de Nossa Senhora da Conceição de Realengo. All the region of Moça Bonita became known as “Padre Miguel”.

== Localization and access ==
The community of Vila Vintém is located between 2 neighborhoods: Realengo (where it starts in Barão do Triunfo street) and Padre Miguel (ends in General Gomes de Castro street).

You can get to the community through Avenida Brasil (dismounting Estrada da Água Branca, Barão do Triunfo street, and Lomas Valentina street in Realengo; and Jacques Ouriques street, Gal. José Faustino, General Gomes de Castro in Padre Miguel). Arriving from Avenida Santa Cruz (other side of the railway track), you cross the viaduct of Realengo or Padre Miguel dismounting also the streets of Barão do Triunfo or Gal. Gomes de Castro, where you arrive at the streets Belizário de Souza and/or Mesquita, the principal streets of Vila Vintém.

== Drug trafficking ==
Vila Vintém is also known as a place where there is much drug trafficking, for it is one of the favelas controlled by the criminal faction Amigos dos Amigos. There is the residence of the drug trafficker Celso Luís Rodrigues, mostly known as Celsinho of Vila Vintém, imprisoned in 2002.
