= A mulher do fim do mundo =

Studio album by Elza Soares
- Released: 1 October 2015
- Studio: Red Bull Studios (São Paulo); Toca Do Tatu (São Paulo); Estúdio Ciatec
- Genre: Vanguarda paulista; dirty samba; jazz; afrobeat; post-punk; noise rock
- Length: 39:31
- Label: Mais Um Discos (UK); Circus (Brazil)
- Producer: Guilherme Kastrup; Ernst von Bönninghausen

Elza Soares chronology
Beba-me (2007)	A mulher do fim do mundo (2015)	End of the World (2017)

Singles from A mulher do fim do mundo
- 1. "Maria da Vila Matilde" Released: 11 December 2015

A mulher do fim do mundo (or The Woman of the End of the World) is a studio album released by Brazilian singer Elza Soares (credited as Elza) in 2015. Soares, who was 85 when the album was released, recorded the album with the help of nearly three dozen producers, composers, songwriters and musicians including Victor Rice and figures from the vanguarda paulista scene. The album combines her usual style of samba with influences from jazz, afro-funk, noise rock and post-punk.

The album received critical acclaim upon being released internationally and would go on to appear in many end-of-year lists.

== Composition ==
=== Style ===
Describing the album's sound, Philip Sherburne notes "the hardscrabble guitar-and-drum interplay; the horns, betraying the faintest hint of two-tone ska; and above all, her impossibly malleable voice, like a scrap of sandpaper turning into a tsunami." "The veteran samba singer’s voice is a polemical force in its own right," writes Ludovic Hunter-Tilney, "a low growl muscling through songs with outcast pride." The writer also notes a post-punk influence in the "abrasive" guitar-work and goes on to compare the track "Luz Vermelha" to a "tropical Fugazi." Sherburne similarly describes the album's combination of "Afro-Brazilian styles with wiry, dissonant strands of punk and noise-rock, where the Ex mingles freely with Tom Zé." Thom Jurek describes the track "Pra Fuder" as "electro-acoustic samba [...] framed by a clattering, bleating acid funk that recalls the Pop Group as it meets Fela's charging multi-horn grooves and swagger." He describes the track "Benedita" as "a rhythm collision where samba, jazz, and the punky friction of Gang of Four rub against one another, break apart, and recombine." The influence of jazz music is also mentioned by Michelle Mercer.

=== Themes ===
Soares had described to a producer that she wanted the album to be about "sex and blackness." Sherburne writes: "The album is part autobiography, part reinvention, and all provocation, channeling both her life’s pain and her incredible resilience into an alloy that is by turns jagged and molten." "The album doubles as a portrait of contemporary Brazil—" he continues, "a country beset by crises, including corruption scandals, the worst recession in over a century, a wave of police brutality, and a rising tide of anti-gay violence." The song "Pra Fuder" ("To Fuck") is described by Mercer as follows: "It's like after decades of strolling along as an object, the girl from Ipanema finally marched over, grabbed the guitar and sang her own wild desires." "Benedita" features a "multi-part narrative detail[ing] drug addiction, persecution of transgender and poor people by the police and celebrates the holiness of the oppressed." "Maria da Vila Matilde" is "about domestic violence, about showing the police a bruised arm. You get the sense she knows the subject all too well." The title track deals with themes such as "loss" and "endurance" whilst Sherburne also finds it to be "a heart-rending ode to samba, carnival, and the lifesaving qualities of music itself." The opening track "Coração do Mar" adapts a poem by Oswald de Andrade described as "a melancholy, imagistic meditation upon loss and slavery that becomes, in [Soares'] weary recitation, something like an inverse national anthem."

== Release ==
"Maira da Vila Matilde" was the only single released from the album. The album itself was released through Circus Records in Brazil and through Mais Um Discos in the UK. The booklet accompanying physical copies contain English translations of the lyrics. A track-for-track remix of the album - End of the World: Remixes - was released in 2017, featuring contributions from Laraaji, Gilles Peterson, Mulú, DJ Marfox and many others. It was also released through Mais Um Discos.

== Reception ==
Professional ratings
Review scores
Source	Rating
Allmusic	4/5 stars
The Arts Desk	5/5 stars
The Financial Times	4/5 stars
The Guardian	5/5 stars
NPR	very favorable
Pitchfork	8.4/10
Robert Christgau	A
Spectrum Culture	3.75/5
Tom Hull	A−

The album received critical acclaim. Robert Christgau praised Soares' voice and wrote: "The collaboration makes complete sense. And there's nothing like [this album]." Sherburne called it "one of the year’s most original and exhilarating listens; that is equally true of its raucous, unorthodox fusions and its quietest, contemplative moments." Robin Denselow gave the album a perfect score and called it "the Brazilian album of the year." Jurek found the album "so nakedly emotional and powerful, it is ultimately an anthem."

=== Accolades ===
Jon Pareles, Slate, Pitchfork, and Christgau would go on to include it among the best albums of the year, the first two ranking it in their respective top tens. In 2022, it was elected as one of the best Brazilian music albums of the last 40 years by a O Globo poll which involved 25 specialists, including Charles Gavin, Nelson Motta, and others.

=== Awards ===
The album won a Latin Grammy Award for "Best MPB Album". At the Brazilian Music Awards, it won for "Pop/Rock/Reggae/Hiphop/Funk: Album".

== Track listing ==
No.	Title	Writer(s)	Length
1.	"Coração do mar"	Oswald de Andrade; José Miguel Wisnik	1:27
2.	"Mulher do fim do mundo"	Romulo Fróes; Alice Coutinho	4:37
3.	"Maria da Vila Matilde"	Douglas Germano	3:44
4.	"Luz vermelha"	Clima; Kiko Dinucci	4:31
5.	"Pra fuder"	Kiko Dinucci	3:56
6.	"Benedita" (featuring Celso Sim)	Celso Sim; Pepê Mata Machado; Joana Barossi; Fernanda Diamant	5:05
7.	"Firmeza?!" (featuring Rodrigo Campos)	Rodrigo Campos	3:32
8.	"Dança" (featuring Romulo Fróes)	Romulo Fróes; Cacá Machado	3:34
9.	"O canal"	Rodrigo Campos	3:07
10.	"Solto"	Clima; Marcelo Cabral	3:41
11.	"Comigo"	Romulo Fróes; Alberto Tassinari	2:17
Total length:			39:31

== Personnel ==
Elza Soares herself is uncredited in the liner notes.

- Guilherme Kastrup - producer, additional engineer, drums, percussion, arrangements
- Celso Sim - artistic director, music, lyrics, vocals
- Romulo Fróes - artistic director, songwriter, vocals
- Ernst von Bönninghausen - executive producer
- Rodrigo "Funai" Costa - recording engineer
- Marcelo Guerreiro - assistant engineer
- Anderson Trindade Barros - additional engineer
- Arthur Luna Beccaris - assistant engineer
- Victor Rice - mixing
- Felipe Tichauer - mastering
- Oswald de Andrade - poetry
- José Miguel Wisnik - music
- Alice Coutinho - songwriter
- Douglas Germano - songwriter
- Clima - songwriter
- Pepê Mata Machado - music
- Joana Barossi - lyrics
- Fernanda Diamant - lyrics
- Cacá Machado - songwriter
- Alberto Tassinari - songwriter
- Kiko Dinucci - songwriter, guitar, repique, acoustic guitar, arrangements
- Rodrigo Campos - songwriter, cavaco, guitar, featured, arrangements
- Marcelo Cabral - songwriter, bass, bass synth, 7-string acoustic guitar, arrangements, string arrangements
- Felipe Roseno - percussion, arrangements
- Cuca Ferreira - flute, baritone saxophone
- Aramís Rocha - violin
- Robson Rocha - violin
- Edmur Mello - viola
- Deni Rocha - cello
- Edy Trombone - trombone
- Thiago França - baritone saxophone, tenor saxophone
- Daniel Nogueira - tenor saxophone
- Douglas Antunes - trombone
- Daniel Gralha - trumpet
- Bixiga 70 - arrangements
- DJ Marco - pick-ups
- Thomas Rohrer - rabeca
- Sidmar Vieira - trumpet

=== Additional credits ===
- Alexandre Eça - photography
