= Mel Gonçalves =

Brazilian singer and television presenter

- Mel Gonçalves de Oliveira
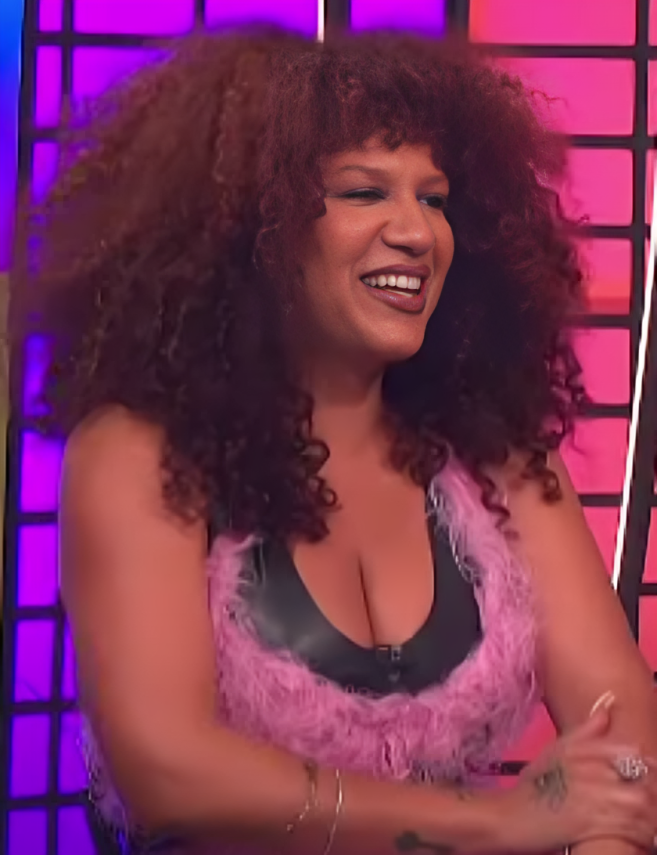
- Born: December 14, 1991 (age 34); Goiânia, Goiás, Brazil
- Occupations: Singer and presenter

Mel Gonçalves de Oliveira, known as Candy Mel or mononymously Mel (stylized as MEL; born 14 December 1991), is a Brazilian singer and presenter. Starting her career as Candy Mel, as a vocalist of Banda Uó together with Mateus Carrilho and Davi Sabbag.

== Biography ==
Mel was raised by her aunt and grandmother. She faced many prejudices in her childhood and adolescence and at the age of 16 she assumed her gender identity as a trans woman.

The trio from Goiânia Mel, Mateus and Davi moved to São Paulo in 2011 due to the band's work. Banda Uó soon achieved national recognition by mixing pop music with other musical genres, such as tecnobrega.

In 2016, Mel was the first trans woman to star in a campaign for cosmetics brand Avon. In the #EuUsoAssim campaign, Mel talks about beauty and breast cancer while doing a makeup tutorial with products in shades of pink and purple.

Mel Gonçalves presenting Estação Plural

Em 2016, Mel became part of the cast of presenters of the debate program Estação Plural alongside singer and composer Ellen Oléria and journalist Fernando Oliveira (Fefito). The TV Brasil program talked about diversity, human rights and citizenship. All the presenters are from the LGBT universe and every week they received a guest to discuss their topics.

Mel is currently seeking to consolidate her solo career as a singer and has collaborated with the carnival group Domingo Ela Não Vai singing axé songs.

Mel debuted her film career in the feature Vento Seco, by Daniel Nolasco, which was selected for Berlinale, the 2020 Berlin International Film Festival. The film has an LGBTQIA+ theme and also features Leandro Faria Lelo, Rafael Theophilo, Renata Carvalho, Del Neto, Macelo D'Avilla, Leo Moreira Sá and Conrado Helt. There is still no forecast of when the film will arrive in Brazilian cinemas.

== Personal life ==
In 2022, Mel tweeted about being demisexual.
