= Me Emoldurei de Presente Pra Te Ter =

EP by Banda Uó
- Released: July 1, 2011
- Genre: Tecnobrega; pop
- Length: 17:12
- Label: Avalanche Tropical
- Producer: Rodrigo Gorky; Pedro D’Eyrot

Banda Uó chronology
Me Emoldurei de Presente Pra Te Ter (2011)	Motel (2012)

Me Emoldurei de Presente Pra Te Ter is the first EP and release of Brazilian band Banda Uó, released on July 1, 2011. For the production, Rodrigo Gorky and Pedro D'Eyrot (Bonde do Rolê) were called.

== Track listing ==
No.	Title	Length
1.	"Não Quero Saber"	2:45
2.	"Shake de Amor"	3:20
3.	"O Gosto Amargo do Perfume"	2:28
4.	"Foi Você Quem Trouxe"	2:24
5.	"Louca Paixão"	3:10
6.	"Rosa"	3:05
Total length:		17:12
