= Realengo =

- Neighborhood
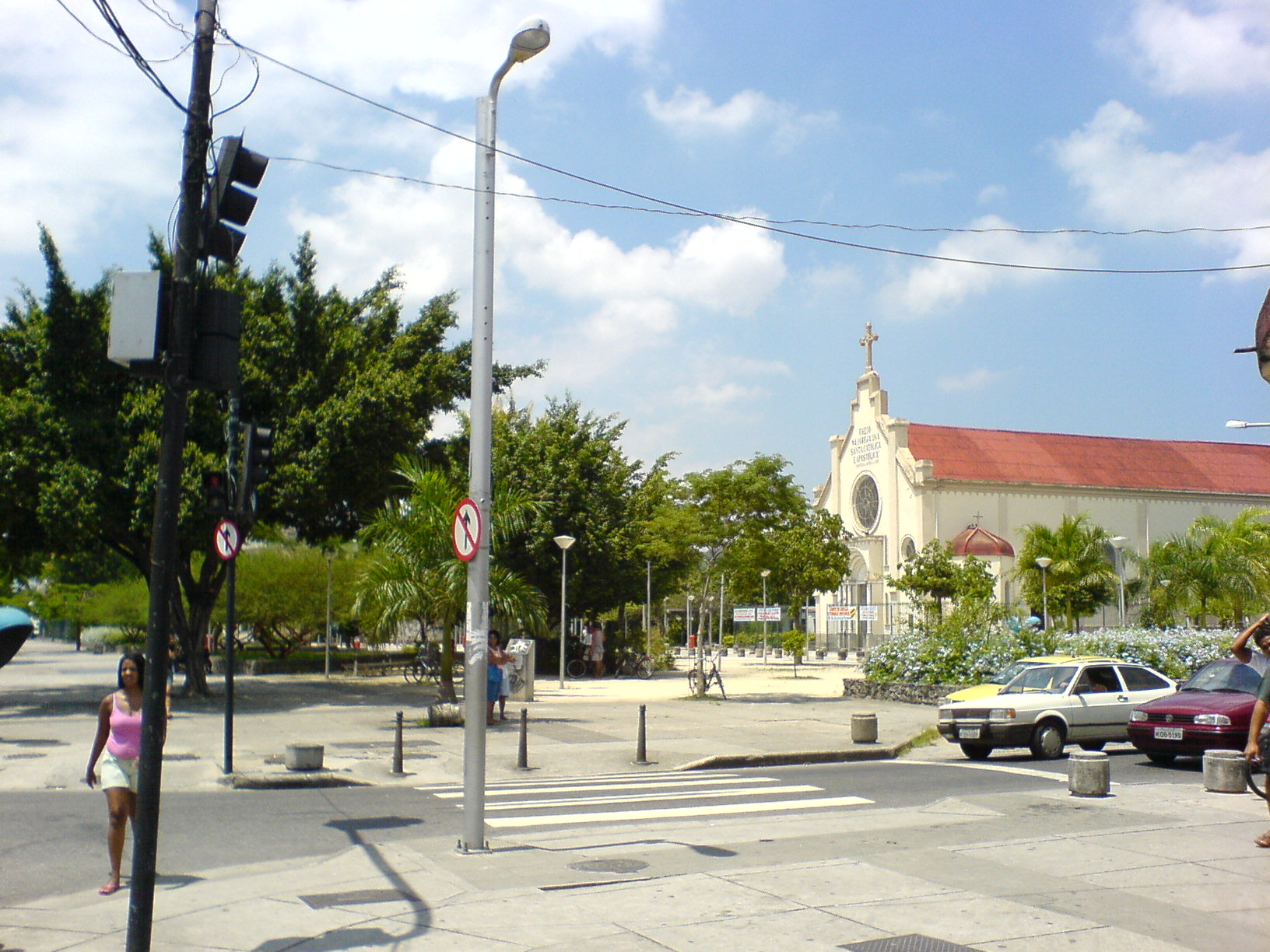
- Praça de Padre Miguel (Father Michael Square) in Realengo.

- Location in Rio de Janeiro Realengo (Brazil)
- Coordinates: 22°52′51″S 43°26′15″W
- Country: Brazil
- State: Rio de Janeiro (RJ)
- Municipality/City: Rio de Janeiro
- Zone: West Zone

Realengo is a neighborhood in the West Zone of Rio de Janeiro, Brazil. The lower and middle-class neighborhood is between the Mendanha and Pedra Branca mountains. It is located between the mountains of Pedra Branca (White Rock) and Mendanha in the northern of the called West Zone of the city, owned and named the XXXIII Administrative Region which encompasses the entire east around the neighborhood. Realengo usually has the highest temperatures in the city, even though the winter nights are often cold because of the proximity to the mountains. Created on November 20, 1815, every year on this day the city's birthday is celebrated with the Week of Realengo. Pedro I of Brazil and Pedro II of Brazil used to go to the farm of Santa Cruz (Saint Cross) by the Estrada Real de Santa Cruz (Royal Road of Santa Cruz), passing by Realengo, where they often stayed.

== Human Development Index ==
According to a survey by the Instituto Pereira Passos (Pereira Passos Institute) and the Brazilian Institute of Geography and Statistics, in 2000 Realengo reached the 89th position in the rank of Human Development Index (HDI).

== Public health ==
State Hospital Albert Schweitzer serves a population of around 700 thousand inhabitants. The Realcordis Hospital is affiliated to Rede D'Or. São Miguel Hospital replaced the former Serv Baby Maternity and Hospital. There is also a unit of UPA 24H (Unidade de Pronto Atendimento 24 Horas - Emergency Service Unit).

== Nature ==
Realengo still has remnants of rainforest that are home to endangered animals such as the Golden lion tamarin, armadillo, macaw, crowned kinglet, monkey frog, and plants like orchids, bromelias and other flora and fauna. The Parque da Pedra Branca (White Rock Park), the door to the Maciço da Pedra Branca (Massif of White Rock) is found in sub-district Barata. Inaugurated on October 17, 2009 by Governor Sérgio Cabral Filho, the government spent R$786,000.00 (seven hundred eighty-six reais) in equipment such as water tanks and springs, it also runs a post of Firemen to maintain order in the reserve.

== History ==
The so-called Terras originated, according to some historians, with the Carta Régia (Royal Charter) of June 27, 1814, by which John VI of Portugal, also a prince, gave land grants in the Senate of Rio de Janeiro land situated in Campo Grande (Big Field). These were called realengos, or royal lands, arising because of territorial conquest by the discovery of the country; they were not ordinary real estate. The land grant in what is now the Realengo neighborhood, center and periphery, was intended to serve only for grazing cattle, supplying meat to butchers in the city. These lands were banned from any sale by the disposition requiring that the Senate survey and prepare them to serve the purpose for which they were donated by that charter.

The village of Realengo was limited by the Senate of Rio de Janeiro, by the provision of July 18, 1814, taking over the Court of the lands tested on the Estrada da Santa Cruz (Road of Saint Cross) and depths of more than twenty fathoms. Despite the express prohibition of lease, sale or other disposition, the Senate, after a certain time, taking advantage of the charter of June 27 has all land granted for such reasons that in addition to the ordinance November 20, 1815 the Prince Regent known as royal notice, on December 20, 1815 that allowed only the tenure of the party which was tested on the Estrada de Santa Cruz (and depths of 20 fathoms the maximum, not at all Realengo).

The neighborhood had its first settlers, slaves and immigrants from the Portuguese island of the Azores, by order of the Prince Regent Dom João, later Dom João VI. When they devoted themselves to agriculture for grazing leading products such as sugar, molasses, alcohol and rum, the port of Guaratiba. Research shows that there was only one mill in Realengo as everything was taken to undergo transformation into other properties.

On April 7, 2011, 23-year-old gunman Wellington Menezes Oliveira killed 12 students in his former school. The crime occurred in the Tasso da Silveira elementary public school, located in this neighbourhood.

== Geography ==
Realengo borders the neighborhoods of Bangu, Padre Miguel, Senador Camará, Jacarepaguá, Taquara, Magalhães Bastos, Vila Militar and Jardim Sulacap in the West Zone of Rio de Janeiro, as well as Ricardo de Albuquerque and Parque Anchieta in the North Zone and the municipality of Nilópolis in Baixada Fluminense.

In the green area of Realengo, there are still remnants of the Atlantic Forest preserved in military areas, mountains and unleased fields. On October 17, 2009, Governor Sérgio Cabral Filho inaugurated the Piraquara branch of the Pedra Branca State Park, in the so-called Serra do Barata, where the Fernandes Barata family farm was located, at a cost of 786,000 reais. According to a study by the Pereira Passos Institute, the neighborhood has 52 public squares for some type of leisure or celebration.

=== Climate ===
Climate data for Rio de Janeiro (station of Realengo, 1981—2010)
Month	Jan	Feb	Mar	Apr	May	Jun	Jul	Aug	Sep	Oct	Nov	Dec	Year
Record high °C (°F)	40.5 (104.9)	40.3 (104.5)	39.5 (103.1)	38.0 (100.4)	35.6 (96.1)	35.4 (95.7)	35.5 (95.9)	38.5 (101.3)	40.6 (105.1)	42.0 (107.6)	40.3 (104.5)	41.5 (106.7)	42.0 (107.6)
Mean daily maximum °C (°F)	32.6 (90.7)	33.3 (91.9)	32.5 (90.5)	30.8 (87.4)	28.1 (82.6)	27.7 (81.9)	26.9 (80.4)	28.0 (82.4)	28.0 (82.4)	29.2 (84.6)	30.4 (86.7)	31.3 (88.3)	29.9 (85.8)
Mean daily minimum °C (°F)	23.5 (74.3)	23.5 (74.3)	23.1 (73.6)	21.3 (70.3)	18.4 (65.1)	16.8 (62.2)	16.4 (61.5)	17.4 (63.3)	18.2 (64.8)	20.0 (68.0)	21.3 (70.3)	22.6 (72.7)	20.2 (68.4)
Record low °C (°F)	17.8 (64.0)	16.9 (62.4)	17.3 (63.1)	13.7 (56.7)	12.2 (54.0)	9.0 (48.2)	8.5 (47.3)	9.8 (49.6)	10.0 (50.0)	11.6 (52.9)	13.2 (55.8)	16.5 (61.7)	8.5 (47.3)
Average precipitation mm (inches)	169.4 (6.67)	113.4 (4.46)	137.8 (5.43)	92.4 (3.64)	52.8 (2.08)	32.8 (1.29)	43.7 (1.72)	26.6 (1.05)	48.1 (1.89)	82.2 (3.24)	111.7 (4.40)	163.9 (6.45)	1,074.8 (42.31)
Average precipitation days (≥ 1.0 mm)	12	9	10	7	7	5	5	5	9	9	9	11	98
Source: Instituto Nacional de Meteorologia — INMET (climatic average of 1981-2010; temperature records of 1971-04-01 to 1976-10-31, 1986-06-01 to 1986-11-30 and 1999-01-01 to present)

== Education ==
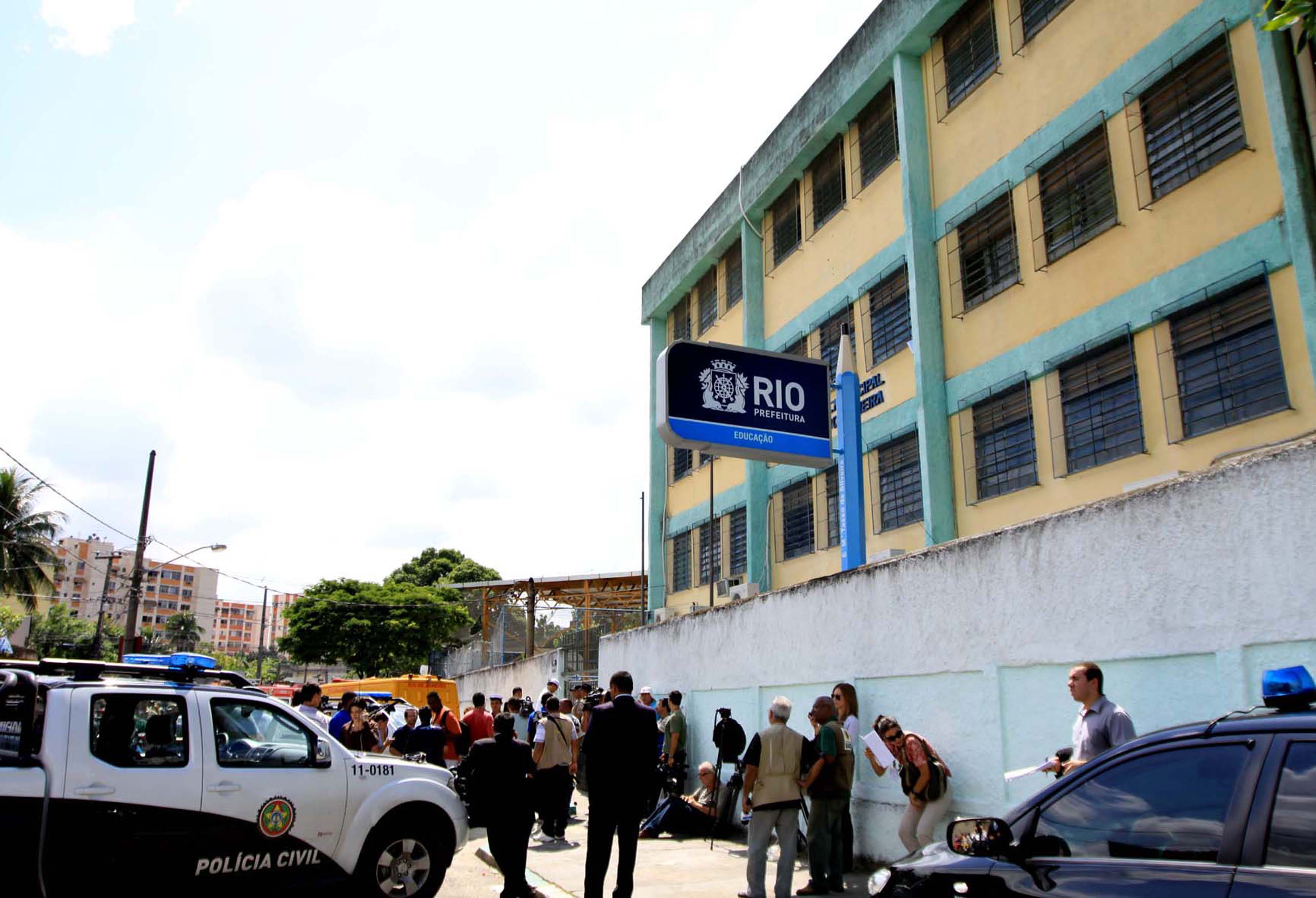
Municipal School Tasso da Silveira after the Rio de Janeiro school shooting

Municipal School Tasso da Silveira is located in Realengo. As of 2011 the public school has about 800 students.
