= Padre Miguel, Rio de Janeiro =

Padre Miguel
- Neighborhood
- Location in Rio de Janeiro Padre Miguel (Brazil)
- Coordinates: 22°52′58″S 43°27′03″W
- Country: Brazil
- State: Rio de Janeiro (RJ)
- Municipality/City: Rio de Janeiro
- Zone: West Zone

Area
  - Total: 486.58 ha (1,202.4 acres)

Population (2010)
  - Total: 64,228
  - Density: 13,200/km^{2} (34,188/sq mi)

The neighborhood of Padre Miguel is situated in the western region of the city of Rio de Janeiro, is of middle class, and borders the neighborhoods of Bangu (west) and Realengo (east). The Mocidade Independente de Padre Miguel and Unidos de Padre Miguel schools of samba are located in Padre Miguel. On the weekend, another attraction is the Ponto Chic, bohemian stronghold of the neighborhood. Simonsen College and Castelo Branco University, two private colleges, are found in the West Zone. Padre Miguel has many excellent private schools, including Adventist School of Padre Miguel, Prioridade Hum and Simonsen High School.

== The origin of the name of the neighborhood ==
The name, Padre Miguel, honors monsignor Miguel de Santa Maria Mochon (1879–1947), considered an outstanding personality of the dismembered region of Realengo in the middle of the 20th century. From the Dílar village in Granada, Spain, priest Miguel came to Realengo when he was only 19 years old. The thin physicist did not expect that he would have an intense life in favor of the poor, sowing schools, creches and libraries. Priest Miguel died in 1947 and is buried in the Igreja de Nossa Senhora da Conceição church. On 16 April of the same year the Padre Miguel neighborhood was created. A statue of Padre Miguel is located in the neighborhood's main square to remember him.
