= Vanessa Jackson =

British painter

Vanessa Jackson RA (born 6 June 1953; Peaslake, Surrey) is a British painter, notable for her wall installation paintings. She was elected to the Royal Academy of Arts in 2015.

== Education and career ==
Jackson studied at Saint Martin's School of Art, where she received a B.A. first class honours in 1975, and the Royal College of Art, where she received an MA in 1978.

In 1985 and 1990, she undertook the Yaddo Residency in to New York. Jackson has an extensive career teaching fine art. She was Head of Painting at Winchester School of Art from 1988 to 1997, MA and research tutor at the Royal College of Art, and senior tutor at the Royal Academy Schools from 1998 to 2013. She is currently a member of the fine art faculty at the British School at Rome and is the Chair of the Edwin Austin Abbey Council, which provides awards for painters.

In 1998-9, Jackson was included in the South Bank Centre's exhibition The Presence of Painting. Her oil on canvas painting So Much Depends was a prizewinner at John Moores Liverpool Exhibition 1993-4.

Jackson was elected to the Royal Academy of Arts on 2 September 2015.

== Exhibitions ==
=== Solo exhibitions ===
- 1978 Cottesloe Auditorium, National Theatre, London
- 1981 AIR Gallery, London
- 1984 Vortex Gallery, London
- 1986 Gotham Book-Mart Gallery, New York
- 1990 The Winchester Gallery, Winchester
- 1992 Goodsway Gallery (Cubitt), London
- 1994 The Eagle Gallery, London
- 1999 North House Gallery, Manningtree
- 2002 InsideSpace Gallery, London
- 2003 Art Inc, Chelsea, New York
- 2005 Keith Talent Gallery, London
- 2005 Studio1.1.Gallery, London
- 2006 Short Circuit since '79, survey show, Poussin Gallery, London
- 2010 Throwing Shapes, Wall Painting, CPG Café Gallery Southwark Park
- 2008 Vertigo in Three Parts, Wall Painting, Sadler's Wells Theatre, London
- 2012 Studio 1.1 Gallery. 30 Day OlympiAINT
- 2013 North House Gallery, Paintings and Prints, Manningtree
- 2014 Rough Cut and Faceted, Marcelle Joseph Projects
- 2017 A Light Here, Tintype Gallery

=== Two-person exhibitions ===
- 1986 Castlefield Gallery, Manchester, with Hamish McLennan
- 1997 Harriet Green Gallery, London, with John Crossley
- 2004 Tunnel Gallery, Tonbridge, with John Dougill

=== Group exhibitions (selected, starting in 2010) ===
- 2010 "Throwing Shapes" curated by Rebecca Geldard, Coleman Gallery, London
- 2010 The Royal Academy Summer Show, The Royal Academy of Art, London
- 2011 Zig Zag curated by Katrina Blannin, Charlie Dutton Gallery
- 2011 The Royal Academy Summer Show, The Royal Academy of Art, London
- 2012 Ha Ha What Does This Represent, Standpoint Gallery, curated by Katrina Blannin and Francesca Simon, catalogue with essay by David Ryan
- 2012 The Royal Academy Summer Show, The Royal Academy of Art, London
- 2013 2Q13, Women Artists, Women Collectors, Lloyds Club, curated by Marcelle Joseph Projects
- 2013 The Perfect Death/Horizons, Lion and Lamb Gallery, organised by Phill Allen and VJ
- 2013 AMERIKA, What America means to non Americans, Camberwell Space, curated by Alasdair Duncan
- 2013 "Even Clouds..." Studio 1.1
- 2013 The Royal Academy Summer Show, The Royal Academy of Art, London
- 2014 Abstract Geometry, Rook & Raven Gallery, with Vanessa Hodgkinson and Rupert Newman
- 2014 The Royal Academy Summer Show, The Royal Academy of Art, London
- 2015 Infero, at Lloyds Club
- 2015 Distressed Geometry, Baden Kunstraum/Zurich, Switzerland
- 2015 O-N-T-O-L-O-G-Y ARTHOUSE1, London with Celia Cook and Brandon Taylor (with Sonia Delauney and Sol Le Witt)
- 2015 Royal Academy Summer Show 2015, invited by Michael Craig-Martin, Royal Academy of Arts, London
- 2015 - 2016 Simply Painting, Inverness Museum & Art Gallery, curated by Jim Mooney (touring to Thurso Art Gallery & The Peacock Arts Centre, Aberdeen)
- 2016 Spore curated by Tom Owen and Grant Foster, Kennington Residency
- 2016 Royal Academy Summer Exhibition
- 2017 Women Artists in Conversation - with Gluck, Fine Art Society
- 2017 Surface Cutting curated by Eillen Cooper, Royal Academy of Arts

== Personal life ==
Jackson's husband was the painter, John Dougill (1934 - 2015).
