= Mr. Catra =

Brazilian composer and musician (1968–2018)

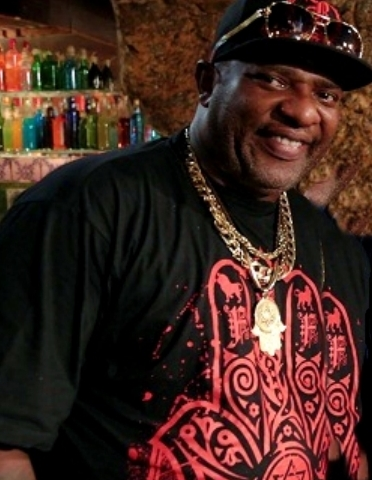
- Mr. Catra in 2015
- Born: Wagner Domingues Costa; 5 November 1968; Rio de Janeiro, Brazil
- Died: 9 September 2018 (aged 49); São Paulo, Brazil
- Other name: Mr. Catra
- Occupations: Singer; rapper; songwriter; activist; actor
- Years active: 1980–2018
- Musical career
- Genres: Funk carioca; hip hop
- Instrument: Vocals
- Label: Galerão Records

Wagner Domingues Costa (5 November 1968 – 9 September 2018), known professionally as Mr. Catra, was a Brazilian singer and actor. He was known in Brazilian pop culture for his large number of children, having two wives, and his famous laugh at the beginning or ending of his songs.

== Biography ==
=== Education ===
Mr. Catra graduated in law and was a polyglot, speaking English, French, German and Hebrew, besides his native Portuguese.

=== Family ===
He had 33 recognized children with 18 women, Catra used to say that "he always adds 2 because he never knows if he has more (children) around that he doesn't know of". He never asked for a paternity test. Two of his children are adopted and are HIV positive. He had been with one of his three wives for 22 years. One of his sons died at 5 years old, leaving the singer traumatized by his loss. In 2011, he converted to Judaism.

== Death ==
Catra was diagnosed with stomach cancer in January 2017 and died on 9 September 2018.

== Discography ==
- O Bonde dos Justos (1994)
- O Segredo do Altíssimo (1996)
- O Fiel (1999)
- Bonde do Tesão (2001)
- Proibidão Liberado (2004)
- Humildade é Tudo (2007)
- Poder da Favela (2008)
- Com Todo Respeito ao Samba (2012)
