= Maracatu Atômico =

1974 song by Jorge Mautner

Song by Jorge Mautner

from the album Jorge Mautner
- Released: 1974
- Genre: MPB
- Length: 3:40
- Label: Polydor
- Songwriter(s): Jorge Mautner, Nélson Jacobina

"Maracatu Atômico" (Portuguese for "Atomic Maracatu") is a song written and composed by Brazilian musicians Jorge Mautner and Nélson Jacobina in 1974, and originally performed by Mautner on his self-titled album released in the same year. It is one of the duo's most famous creative outputs, thanks to the numerous cover versions it received over the years, the most famous of them being the one made by Nação Zumbi in 1996.

== Nação Zumbi cover ==
"Maracatu Atômico"

Single by Nação Zumbi

from the album Afrociberdelia
- Released: June 1996
- Recorded: 1996
- Genre: Mangue Bit
- Length: 4:45
- Label: Chaos
- Songwriter(s): Jorge Mautner, Nélson Jacobina
- Producer(s): Eduardo BiD, Chico Science & Nação Zumbi

Nação Zumbi singles chronology
"Manguetown" (1996)	"Maracatu Atômico" (1996)	"Malungo" (1998)

Music video
- "Maracatu Atômico" on YouTube

Pernambuco-based Mangue Bit band Nação Zumbi covered the song for their second studio album, Afrociberdelia, from 1996; it served as the album's second single. A critically acclaimed music video for the song, directed by Raul Machado, was shot in April of the same year. It was the last music video to be ever broadcast by MTV Brasil, which ceased its activities on September 30, 2013; it was hosted by former MTV VJ Cuca Lazzarotto, who also hosted the channel's first music video back in its inauguration on October 20, 1990.

In 2010, the band re-recorded the song for the soundtrack of the documentary film Senna.

=== Track listing ===
1. Maracatu Atômico (Album Version) – 4:45
2. Maracatu Atômico (Atomic Version) – 4:33
3. Maracatu Atômico (Ragga Mix) – 3:30
4. Maracatu Atômico (Trip Hop) – 3:42

=== Personnel ===
- Chico Science – vocals
- Dengue – bass
- Gilmar Bola 8 – alfaia
- Gira – alfaia
- Jorge dü Peixe – alfaia
- Lúcio Maia – electric guitar
- Pupillo – drum kit
- Toca Ogam – percussion, vocals

== Other versions ==
Gilberto Gil was the first one to cover the song, for his 1974 album Cidade do Salvador. Gil's version would eventually be included in the soundtrack of the 2002 film Durval Discos.

In 2012, Jorge Mautner re-recorded the song alongside Pedro Sá, Alexandre Kassin, Domenico Lancellotti and Berna Ceppas for the soundtrack of the documentary Jorge Mautner: O Filho do Holocausto. In the same year, the song was also covered by singer BNegão at the closing ceremony of the London Summer Olympics.

David Correy, an American Brazilian singer who was a finalist for the second season of The X Factor in 2012, wrote an English-language adaptation of the song entitled "Atomic Maracatu".

== Critical reception and legacy ==
Jorge Mautner once stated in an interview that he and Nélson Jacobina were "flattered and very delighted" after listening to Nação Zumbi's cover of their song for the first time.

Nação Zumbi's iteration of the song was featured in 48th place on a list of the 100 greatest Brazilian songs of all time by magazine Rolling Stone. In 2012, newspaper Folha de S.Paulo set up a public poll asking readers to vote on the most influential Brazilian music videos of all time, and "Maracatu Atômico" was featured in 3rd place. Nevertheless, the choice (as well as the list itself) received minor criticism by Folha critic André Barcinski, who said the voters "used heart instead of reason during voting" and that the list "eschewed creative originality and historical significance for [the voters'] affective memories and personal tastes". Commenting on the song's music video, he said that it was too aesthetically derivative from Red Hot Chili Peppers' "Give It Away".
