= Da Lama ao Caos =

Studio album by Chico Science & Nação Zumbi
- Released: April 1994 (Brazil); June 13th 1995 (USA)
- Recorded: 1993–1994 at Estúdio Nas Nuvens, Rio de Janeiro
- Genre: Manguebeat
- Length: 50:15
- Label: Chaos
- Producer: Liminha

Chico Science & Nação Zumbi chronology
Da Lama ao Caos (1994)	Afrociberdelia (1996)

Singles from Da Lama ao Caos
- 1. "Da Lama ao Caos" Released: 1994; 2. "A Cidade" Released: 1994; 3. "A Praieira" Released: 1994; 4. "Samba Makossa" Released: 1994

Professional ratings
Review scores
Source	Rating
AllMusic	4.5/5 stars

Da Lama ao Caos (Brazilian Portuguese: [da ˈlɐ̃m‿aw ˈkaws]; transl. From Mud to Chaos) is the debut album by the Brazilian band Chico Science & Nação Zumbi. Released in 1994, the album presents a fusion of funk rock and maracatu and contributed for spreading the music of Pernambuco around the world. Da Lama ao Caos is considered the manifesto of the Manguebeat movement.

It was listed by Rolling Stone Brazil as one of the 100 best Brazilian albums in history (13th position). The magazine also voted its title track as the 22nd greatest Brazilian song. In 2022, it was elected as the best Brazilian music album of the last 40 years by a O Globo poll which involved 25 specialists, including Charles Gavin, Nelson Motta, and others.

== Cover ==
The album cover, conceived by director Hilton Lacerda, is a collage of images that appear to be "pixilated", with each pixel being a different collage. The back cover is picture of a crab's claw, purportedly zoomed-in so it becomes pixilated and it becomes clear that the image had been developed with a computer.

The first version of the artwork was in black-and-white with some blue shades, but the label refused it, demanding more colors, and that's how the final version was born.

== Track listing ==
All tracks are written by Chico Science, except where noted.

No.	Title	Writer(s)	Length
1.	"Monólogo ao Pé do Ouvido"		1:07
2.	"Banditismo por Uma Questão de Classe"		3:59
3.	"Rios, Pontes & Overdrives"	Chico Science, Fred Zero Quatro	4:03
4.	"A Cidade"		4:46
5.	"A Praieira"		3:36
6.	"Samba Makossa"		3:03
7.	"Da Lama ao Caos"		4:31
8.	"Maracatu de Tiro Certeiro"	Chico Science, Jorge dü Peixe	4:11
9.	"Salustiano Song"	Chico Science, Lúcio Maia	1:28
10.	"Antene-se"		3:35
11.	"Risoflora"		4:08
12.	"Lixo do Mangue"	Lúcio Maia	1:45
13.	"Computadores Fazem Arte"	Fred Zero Quatro	3:13
14.	"Côco Dub (Afrociberdelia)"		6:45

- Tracks "Computadores Fazem Arte" and "Côco Dub (Afrociberdelia)" are not included in the vinyl version.

== Personnel ==
Chico Science & Nação Zumbi

- Chico Science – vocals; samplers on "Lixo do Mangue"
- Lúcio Maia – guitars
- Alexandre Dengue - bass
- Toca Ogan - percussion and effects
- Canhoto - snare drum
- Gira - alfaia
- Gilmar Bolla 8 - alfaia
- Jorge du Peixe - alfaia

Special guests

- André Jungmann - berimbau on "Maracatu de Tiro Certeiro"
- Chico Neves - samplers on "Rios, Pontes & Overdrives", "A Cidade", "Samba Makossa", "Antene-se" and "Côco Dub (Afrociberdelia)"
- Liminha - shouting on "Lixo do Mangue"

Production

- Liminha - producer, mixer, recording engineer
- Jorge Davidson - artistic director
- Ronaldo Viana - mixing coordinator
- Guilherme Calicchio - recording engineer
- Vitor Farias - recording engineer
- Renato Muñoz - studio assistant
- Ricardo Garcia - technical assessor
- Alberto Fernandes - technical assessor
- Steve Hall - mastering
- Eddy Schreyer - mastering
- Recorded and mixed at Estúdio Nas Nuvens, Rio de Janeiro
- Mastered at Future Disc, Oregon
- Dolores & Morales - graphical project
- Fred Jordão - photography
- Luciana K - finisher
- Helder - illustrations, finisher
- Hilton Lacerda - comics text, finisher
- Cláudio Almeida - images/texts editing, finisher
- Estado da Arte - collaboration
- João Belian - collaboration
