= Afro-Brazilian music =

Afrodescendant musical traditions of Brazil

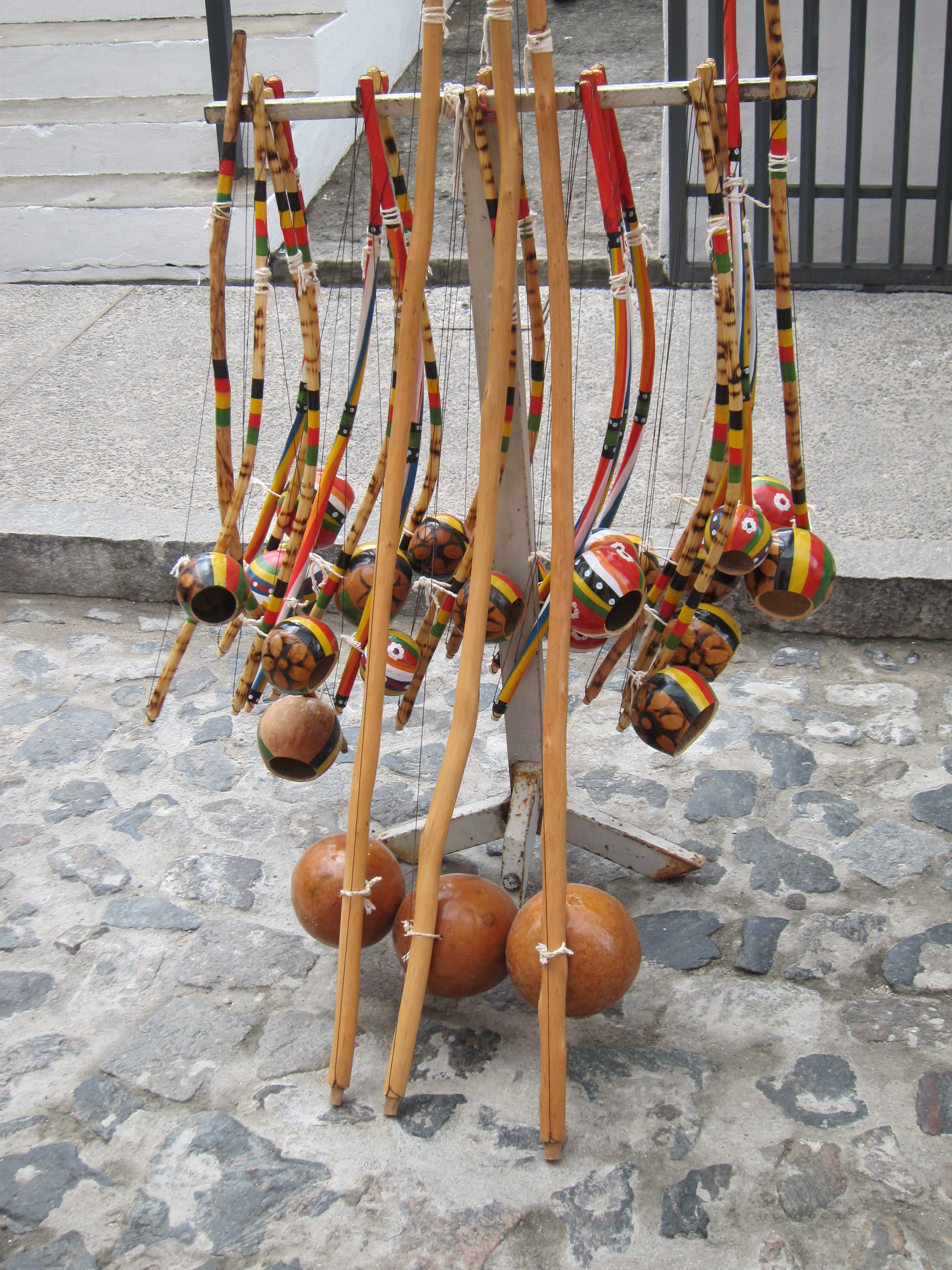
Berimbau, an Afro-Brazilian instrument

Afro-Brazilian music consists of a mixture of musical and cultural influences from Sub-Saharan Africa, Portugal, and on a smaller scale, Amerindian music, creating a large variety of styles. Lyrics, instruments, and even melodies often have connections to African culture and even influence culture and music in other countries today. It is strongly influenced by African rhythms. The most well known sub-genres of Afro-Brazilian musical genres are samba, marabaixo, maracatu, ijexá, coco, jongo, carimbó, lambada, maxixe, and maculelê.

Like every other part of the American continent where there were African slaves, music made by Afro-descendants was initially neglected and marginalized, until they gained their reputation at the beginning of the 20th century and became extremely popular in contemporary culture. This breakthrough came in part from the unique instruments that are used in Afro-Brazilian music including afoxé, agogô, alfaia, atabaque, berimbau, and tambor.

Nearly all Brazilian music is influenced by traces of Afro-Brazilian music, so much so that Afro-Brazilian artist Letieres Leite says that all Brazilian music is Afro-Brazilian.

== Musicians ==
There are many artists that influenced the Afro-Brazilian music and culture. Gilberto Gil is one of the most well-known Afro-Brazilian artists, not only because of his award-winning music, but also because of his political activism. In his career, he won two Grammys in the Best World Music Album category and received seven Grammy nominations. Other popular artists and groups include Pixinguinha, Abigail Moura, Nei Lopes, Agnaldo Timóteo, Racionais MC's and many more. These artists play many different genres including, but not limited to, samba, rap, jazz, rock, funk, reggae, and disco. Afro-Brazilian music was influenced by African instruments, rhythms, cultures, and beliefs that are still present in the day-to-day culture of Brazil.

== Instruments ==
The instruments used in Afro-Brazilian music vary depending on the genre being played. This being the case, a large amount of instruments exist that are unique to Afro-Brazilian music. These instruments include:

- Afoxé - The name of this instrument is of Yoruba origin and literally translates to "the language that makes it happen." The afoxé was linked extremely closely to African ceremonies and to Candomblé; so much so, that performances that use it are often referred to as "street Candomblé."
- Agogô - A high-pitched bell type instrument that stands out during a capoeira performance. It is used to complement the rhythm of a capoeira match and can be heard in many variations of Samba music.
- Alfaia - The alfaia is predominantly used in Maracatu and Mangue beats. With origins in Pernambuco, Brazil, this drum is different from similar drums because tightening the ropes on the sides changes its tone.
- Atabaque- There are three different types of atabaque. The tall Rum, the medium-sized Rum-Pi, and the smallest Le drums. The atabaque are often used in capoeira and maculelê dances.
- Berimbau: The berimbau is a single-stringed instrument that is linked to the Afro-Brazilian martial art form of Capoeira and can also be heard in Jazz and traditional folk music. It produces a unique "twang" sound.
- Ganzá - Another percussive instrument of African origin. The ganza is a shaking instrument typically made out of tin, comparable to the Indian maraca or the African calabash. While a very simple instrument, it can perform rhythms as complex as the Bossa Nova.
- Pandeiro or adufo: The pandeiro is very similar to a tambourine, with symbols lining the side and a drum cover stretched around its face. A pandeiro's drum face can be tuned to sound like a drum in a drum set. It is mainly used in samba, choro, coco, and capoeira music.
- Reco-reco: The reco-reco is a percussive instrument with heavy African influence that is very similar to the American instrument nicknamed "fish-scales." Used heavily in samba, it was traditionally made from bamboo sticks.

== Candomblé ==
The instruments and rhythms that constitute came directly from African traditions by the slaves brought to Brazil. Candomblé is a tradition that became one of Brazil's oldest native religions. Candomblé is one of the original uses that slaves had for the instruments and rhythms we identify today as Afro-Brazilian. In the tradition of Candomblé, there is great reverence for Afro-Brazilian instruments and rhythms. During ceremonies of Candomblé, instruments like the Atabaque and Agogô are used to appease the Orixás. There is believed to be a spiritual power to these instruments and rhythms that entrance the listener to become more available to commune with the Orixás. There are also specific drum patterns and rhythms that can be used to call, ban, and interact with the Orixás. Afro-Brazilian music that was made in the circles of Candomblé eventually spread to help create early samba. Candomblé was seen as an inappropriate practice by the slave owners and the majority of Brazil. In Candomblé, dancing and music are sacred, so meetings would be disguised as parties to evade intervention. It was at these parties hosted by Tios and Tias (priests in Candomblé) where the first samba beats and dances were originated in the peripheries of Rio de Janeiro.

== Capoeira ==
Capoeira's influence on Afro-Brazilian music is wide. There are many different types of capoeira performances, each one with a different beat to accompany the martial art. A few of these beats are:

- Traditional Candomblé - A traditional religious song from Candomblé, it focuses on the traditional dances and ceremonies which play a huge part in the religion. In the creation of Capoeira Regional, Mestre Bimba removed many of Capoeira's original religious rituals and practices.
- Samba de roda - Uses some of the earliest versions of Samba to pair with folkloric dances from both Africa and Brazil. It is characterized by a roda (circle) in which the women, and also the men, begin to dance samba in such a way that all the capoeiristas present end up joining in. The rodas are always lively and full of high spirits and in them, the women show all their sensuality in a graceful way. Samba de roda usually starts after the capoeira rodas have finished.
- Banguela de Regional - This is a beat created by Mestre Bimba to mimic the "Capoeira Angola" style. These types of performances are over much slower and low beats and also used to calm the players' nerves when combat gets tough.
- Os Toques da Regional - The beats (toques) differ depending on the mestre and the type of capoeira. Among the capoeira regional beats are: Hino da Capoeira Regional, Benguela, Cavalaria, Santa Maria, Pequeno, Idalina, and Amazonas. The inclusion of many different beats for one performance is considered a microcosm of Brazil as a whole.
- As Quadras e Os corridos da Regional - These types of songs include significantly more chanting than the previous styles. The "quadras" are chants that start the performance and the "corridos" are chants that keep the energy and rhythm of the performance fast and energetic.
- O Hino do Grupo Ginga - Mestre Itapoan, founder of Ginga Associação de Capoeira and student of the revered Mestre Bimba, has become the preeminent authority on Capoeira Regional and the history of Capoeira because of his life-time devotion to its study and practice. According to the Association, O Hino do Grupo Ginga "played to the traditional Regional rhythm, 'São Bento Grande', is Ginga Capoeira's anthem. It tells of Ginga Capoeira's origins, celebrates our presence in the world of Capoeira, and calls upon all who support and challenge us".
