= Cordel do Fogo Encantado =

Brazilian music group from Arcoverde

Cordel do Fogo Encantado is a Brazilian band from Arcoverde who mix different Brazilian musical genres, such as samba de côco, toré indígena, embolada, and reisado, with pop-rock melodies. The band derives its name from cordel, a type of handmade illustrated pamphlet literature made by woodcut artists in northeastern Brazil. Cordel do Fogo Encantado is associated with Pernambuco's Mangue Beat, a musical movement that is repopularizing traditional northeastern Brazilian folkloric musical genres by mixing them with rock and funk music.

Their album Viagem ao Coração do Sol was ranked as the 36th best Brazilian album of 2018 by the Brazilian edition of Rolling Stone magazine and among the 25 best Brazilian albums of the second half of 2018 by the São Paulo Association of Art Critics.

== Discography ==
- Cordel do Fogo Encantado (2001)
- O Palhaço do Circo Sem Futuro (2003)
- Transfiguração (2006)
- Viagem ao Coração do Sol (2018)

== See also ==
- Chico Science
- Mangue Beat
- Nação Zumbi
- Brazilian rock
