= Maracatu Nação =

Brazilian musical genre

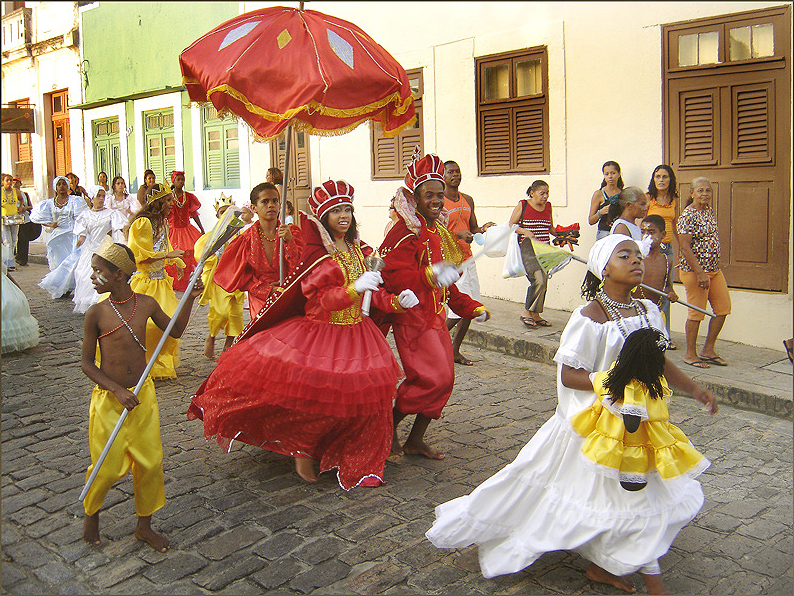
A maracatu block in Olinda. The calunga (black doll) goes in front with the dama do paço.

Maracatu Nação, also known as Maracatu de Baque Virado, is a type of maracatu, a musical rhythm, dance and ritual of religious syncretism that originated in the state of Pernambuco. It is the oldest Afro-Brazilian rhythm.

It is composed by a percussive musical group that follows a royal parade. The bands present a spectacle full of symbolism and marked by aesthetic richness and musicality. The most important moment is when groups parade and perform in the streets during Carnival.

== History ==
The oldest record of Maracatu Nação dates back to 1711, but the year of its origin is uncertain. However, it is clear that it originated in Pernambuco and has transformed ever since.

One of the oldest groups is Maracatu Elefante, founded on November 15, 1800, in Recife by the slave Manuel Santiago after his revolt against the leadership of Maracatu Brilhante. The elephant was chosen as the name and symbol of the group because it was protected by Oxalá, the orisha associated with the creation of the world and the human race. One of the peculiarities of this style of maracatu is the practice of leading three calungas (black dolls) instead of two, as is common in other maracatus. They are: Dona Leopoldina, Dom Luís and Dona Emília, who represent the orishas Iansã, Shango and Oshun, respectively. Nação Elefante was the first to be led by a matriarch, because up until then groups had always been led by a male figure.

There are Maracatu Nação groups all over Brazil, as well as abroad, especially in Europe and North America.

== Parade ==
The maracatu parades are an example of the ancient African courts, since the blacks, when kidnapped and sold into slavery, carried their titles of nobility back to Brazil. The parade is formed by a flag or banner opening the wings. At the back is the dama do paço, who carries the mystical calunga, representing all the group's spiritual entities.

Respectively, the iabás (popularly called baianas) follow and, shortly afterwards, the court, the king and queen of the maracatu, titles handed down hereditarily. This wing represents the nobility of the Nação.

On each side are the slaves or catirinas, usually young women wearing chiton dresses. Keeping the rhythm of the parade, the batuqueiros follow. The instruments are diverse: alfaias, boxes or taróis, ganzás and abês, these led by women who are at the head of the group and who make their playing a spectacle in itself.

== Characters ==
The characters that comprise the parade include the following:

- Porta-estandarte: carries the banner containing the name of the association, a figure that represents it and the year it was created;
- Dama do paço: a woman who carries a calunga (a richly dressed wooden doll that symbolizes a dead queen or entity) in one hand;
- King and queen: the most important figures in the parade;
- Vassal: a slave who carries the pallium (the parasol that protects kings);
- Ladies of the court: wealthy ladies who do not hold noble titles;
- Iabás: female slaves;
- Batuqueiros: they animate the procession by playing several instruments, such as war boxes, alfaias, gonguê, shekeres and maracas;
- Court figures such as princes, ministers and ambassadors.

== Gallery ==
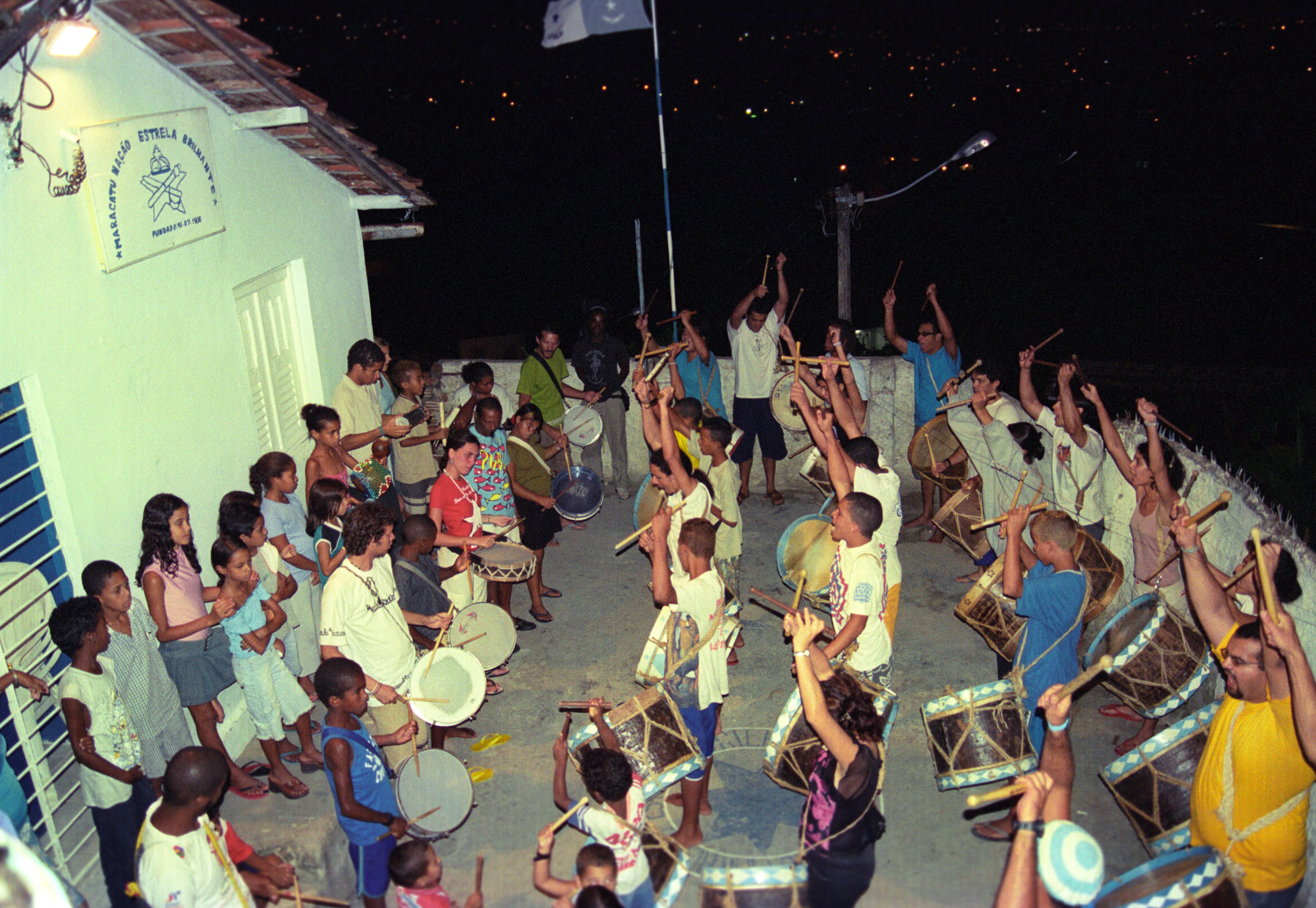
Maracatu Nação Estrela Brilhante from Recife.

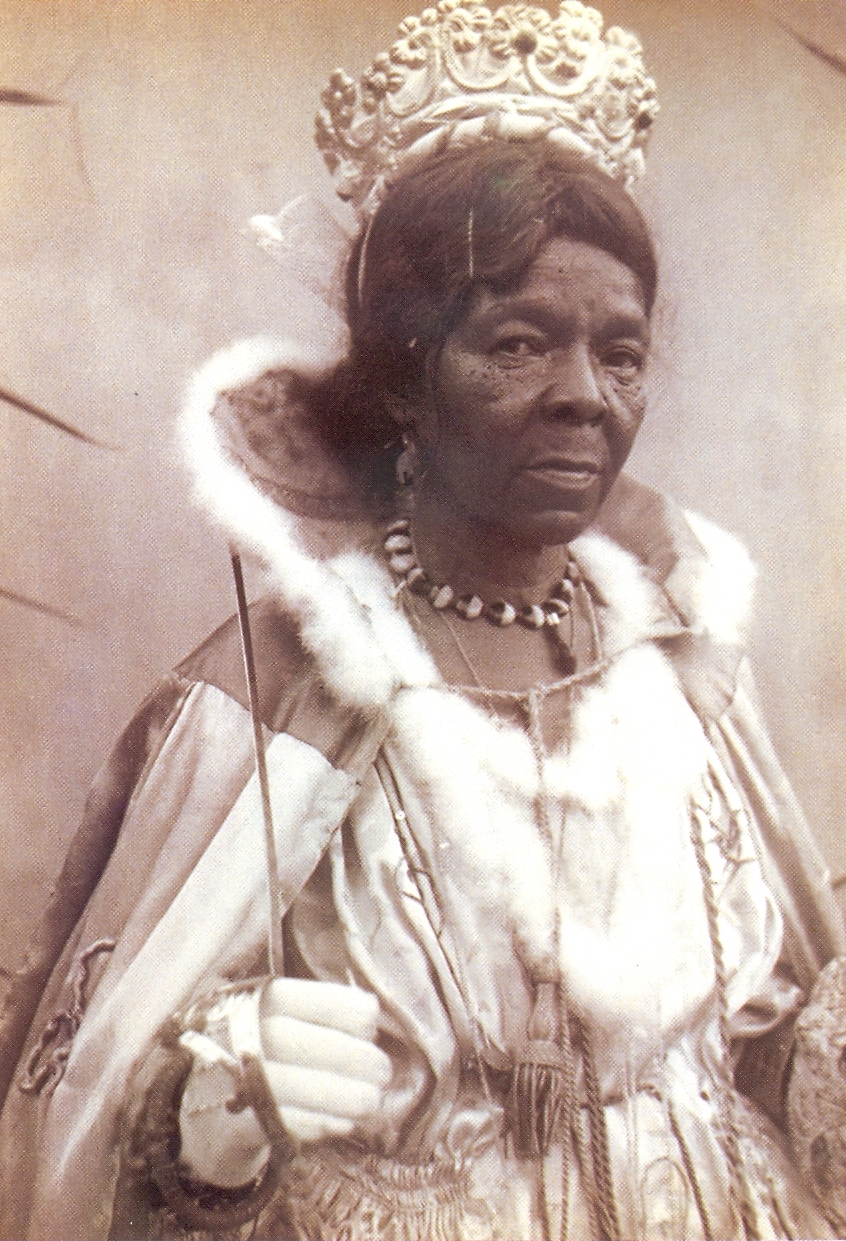
Dona Santa, Queen of Maracatu Elefante, c. 1935.

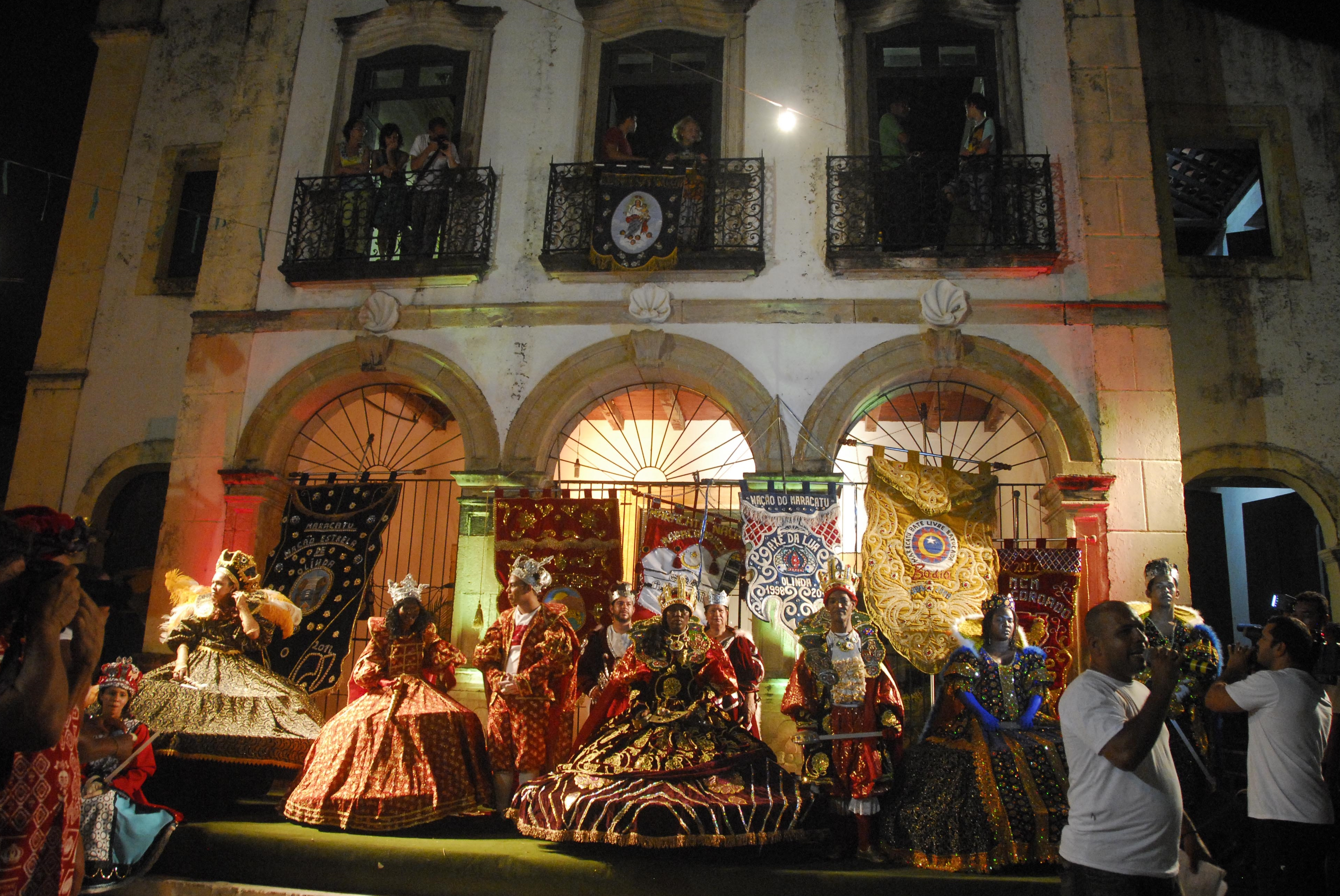
Maracatus at the Church of Our Lady of the Rosary of Black Men in Olinda, the first church in Brazil to belong to a black brotherhood.

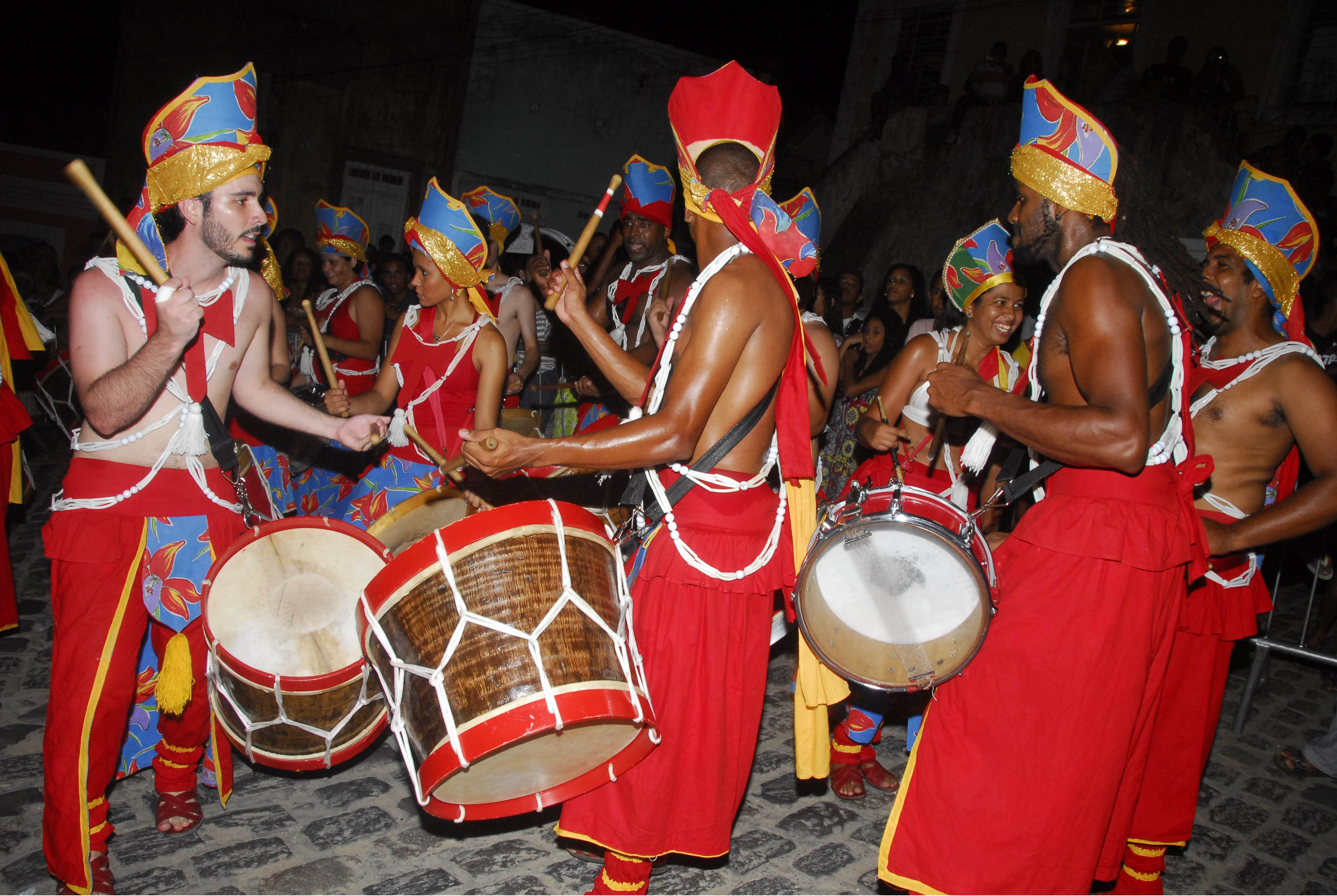
Percussion of Maracatu Nação, featuring an alfaia.

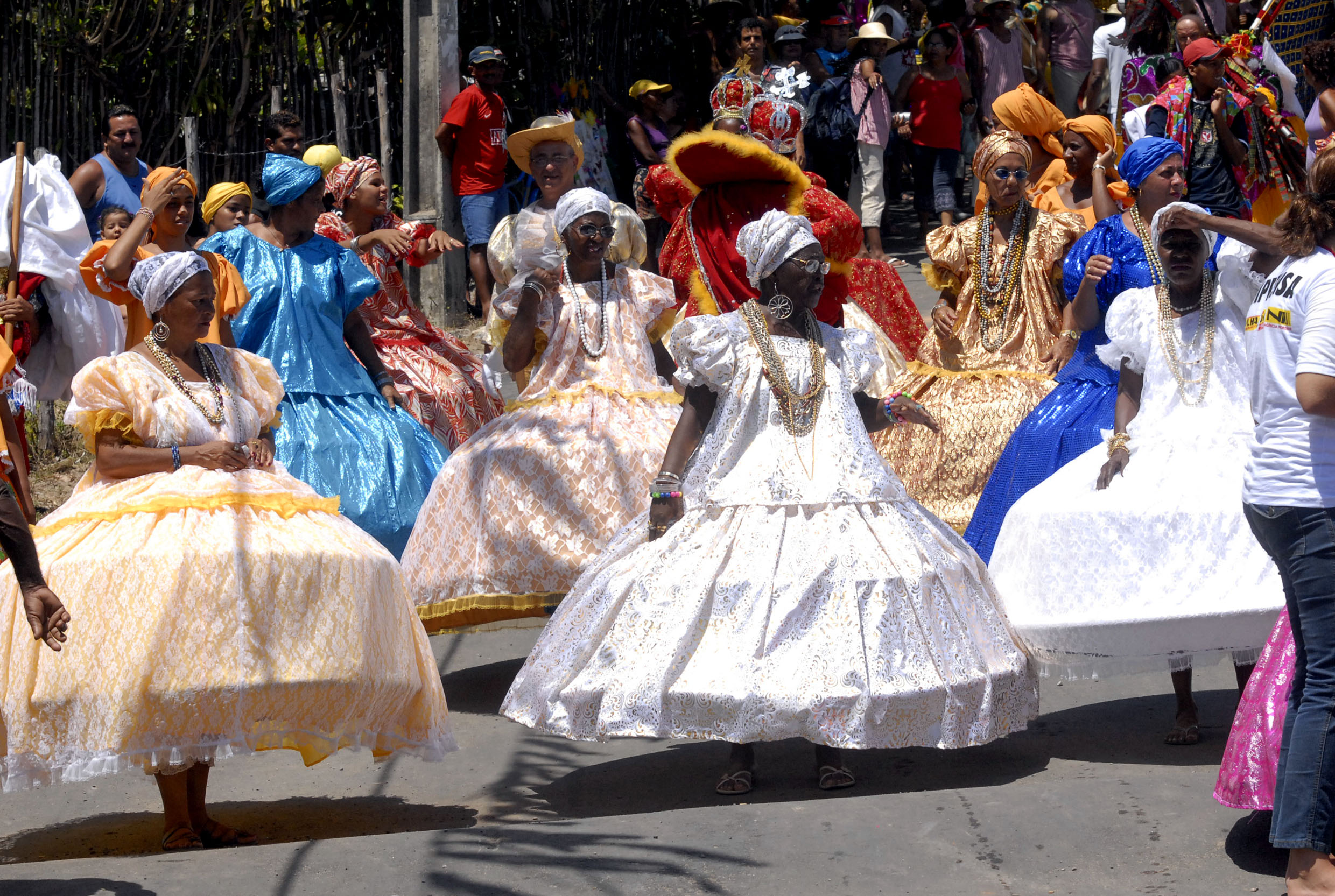
Women playing abê.

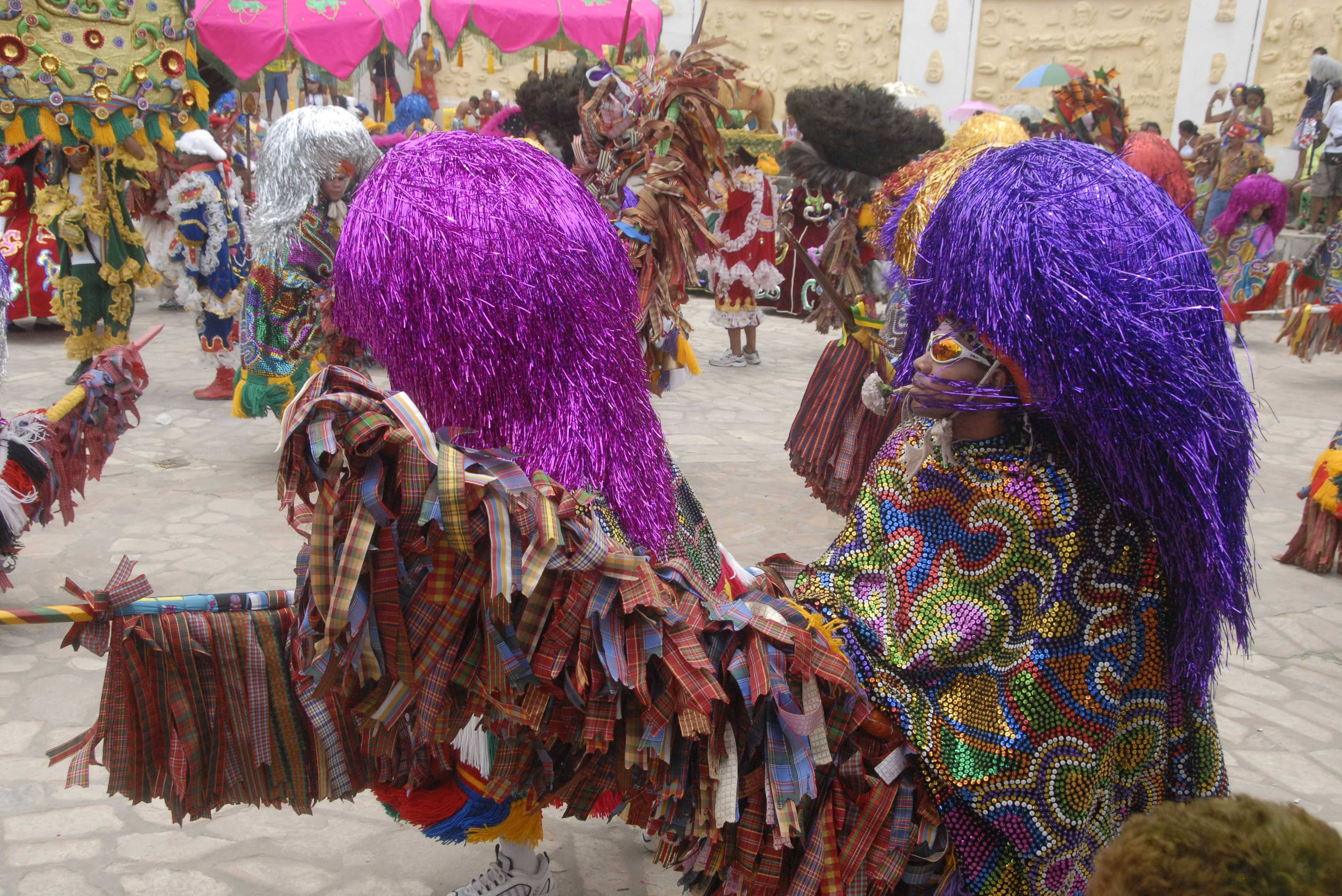
Carnival in Olinda.

== See also ==
- Maracatu
