= Marabaixo =

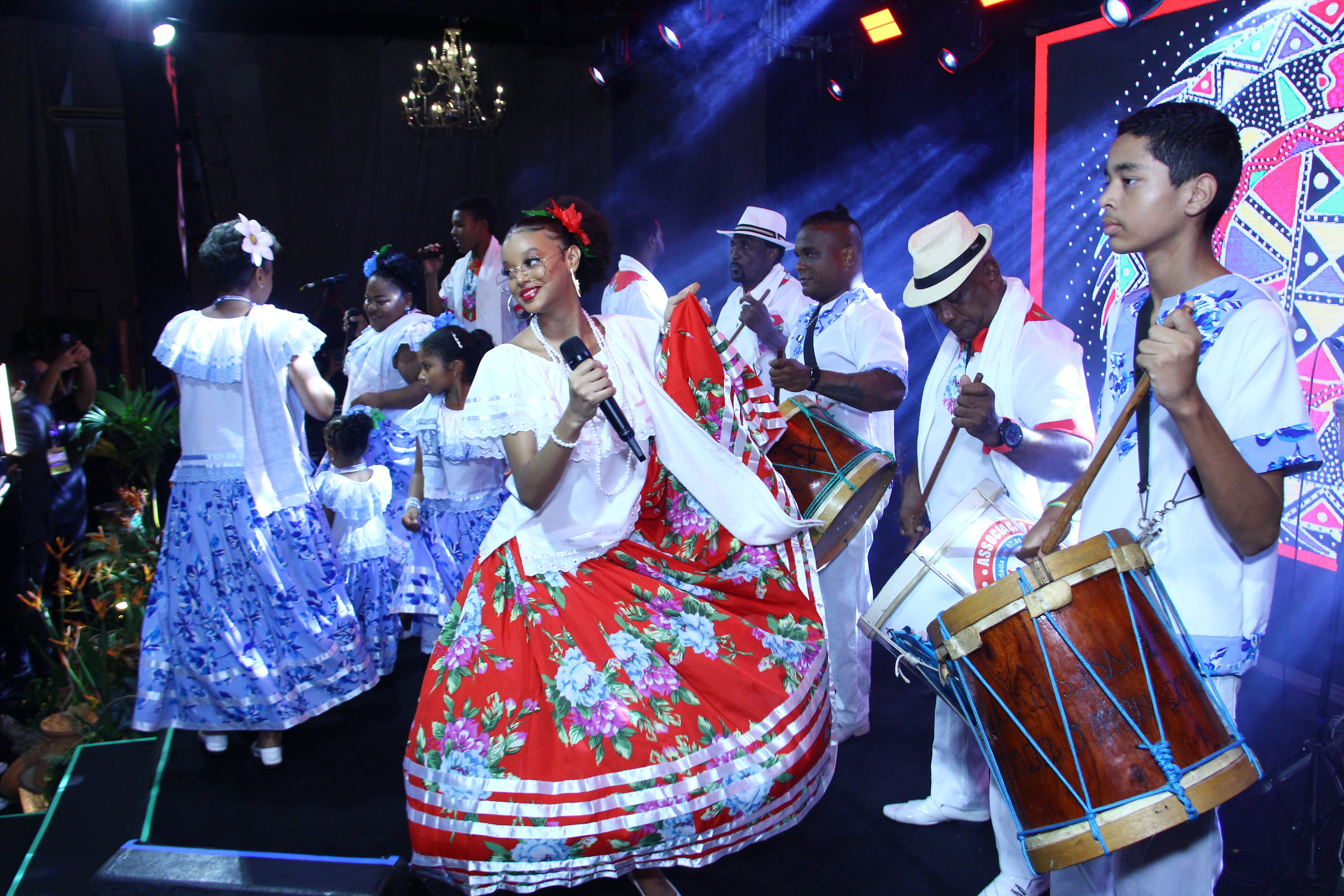
Marabaixo performance in 2024

Marabaixo is a traditional Brazilian cultural manifestation practiced by Afro-descendant communities in the state of Amapá, in the northern region of Brazil. It comprises a circular dance, collective singing, and percussive music, all of which are intrinsically linked to the festivities of popular Catholicism held in honor of the community's patron saints. As a constitutive element of Amapá's cultural identity, the marabaixo has been officially recognized by the National Institute of Historic and Artistic Heritage as an intangible cultural heritage of Brazil.

== Etymology ==
The origin of the word "marabaixo" is uncertain, and several interpretations exist regarding its meaning. According to one account, the term refers to the trajectory of the slave ship traveling "mar abaixo" (literally, "down the sea", i.e., from Africa to Brazil). Another hypothesis suggests it is a corruption of the Arabic word marabiti, meaning "to praise". A further version holds that the term originated from the death of an African enslaved person who perished during the voyage and was cast overboard, with a dance later being performed in his honor.

== History ==
The Afro-Brazilian presence in Amapá originates from the transatlantic slave trade, which intensified after 1750 with Portuguese colonial efforts to secure the Amazonian borders, leading to the founding of settlements and fortifications that drove a substantial influx of enslaved Africans from West and Central Africa. By the early nineteenth century, enslaved people formed a significant part of the local population, and the oppressive conditions gave rise to frequent escapes and the formation of numerous quilombos. Even after abolition in 1888, this historical legacy remained deeply embedded in the region's demographic and cultural identity.

According to oral tradition, marabaixo dates back to the period of slavery, with archival evidence from 1872 describing rituals among enslaved populations in Macapá that closely resemble contemporary practices. Historically performed in front of the Church of São José, the dance faced persistent opposition from segments of civil society and the Catholic Church, which condemned it as indecent and demonic, culminating in acts of repression such as the destruction of ceremonial objects and public denunciations throughout the late nineteenth and early twentieth centuries. A decisive rupture occurred with the creation of the Federal Territory of Amapá in 1943, when the ensuing urbanization project forcibly removed the predominantly Black population from the city center to peripheral neighborhoods such as Laguinho and Favela (now Santa Rita), a displacement that remains a source of collective resentment. This removal, combined with the influx of migrants from other states and the arrival of foreign missionary orders, intensified social stigmatization, with marabaixo being dismissed as "Black people's dance" and practitioners excluded from mainstream social and religious circles well into the 1960s and 1980s. In response to this marginalization, the celebration migrated from the church steps to private homes in the peripheral neighborhoods, where the devotional prayers and festive dances continued to be held in a more intimate, community-based setting, preserving the tradition despite adversity.

Beginning in the 1980s, the Marabaixo experienced a revival led by Black communities, social movements, and state authorities, culminating in its inscription as a Brazilian intangible cultural heritage by the National Institute of Historic and Artistic Heritage in 2018, following prior state-level recognition and the establishment of cultural institutions such as the Black Culture Center and the annual Encounter of the Drums. Despite this institutional valorization and its growing influence on local artists, prejudice and misinformation persist within segments of Amapá society, as evidenced by recurring friction with religious leaders and public controversies, indicating that full social acceptance remains an ongoing challenge.

== Characteristics ==
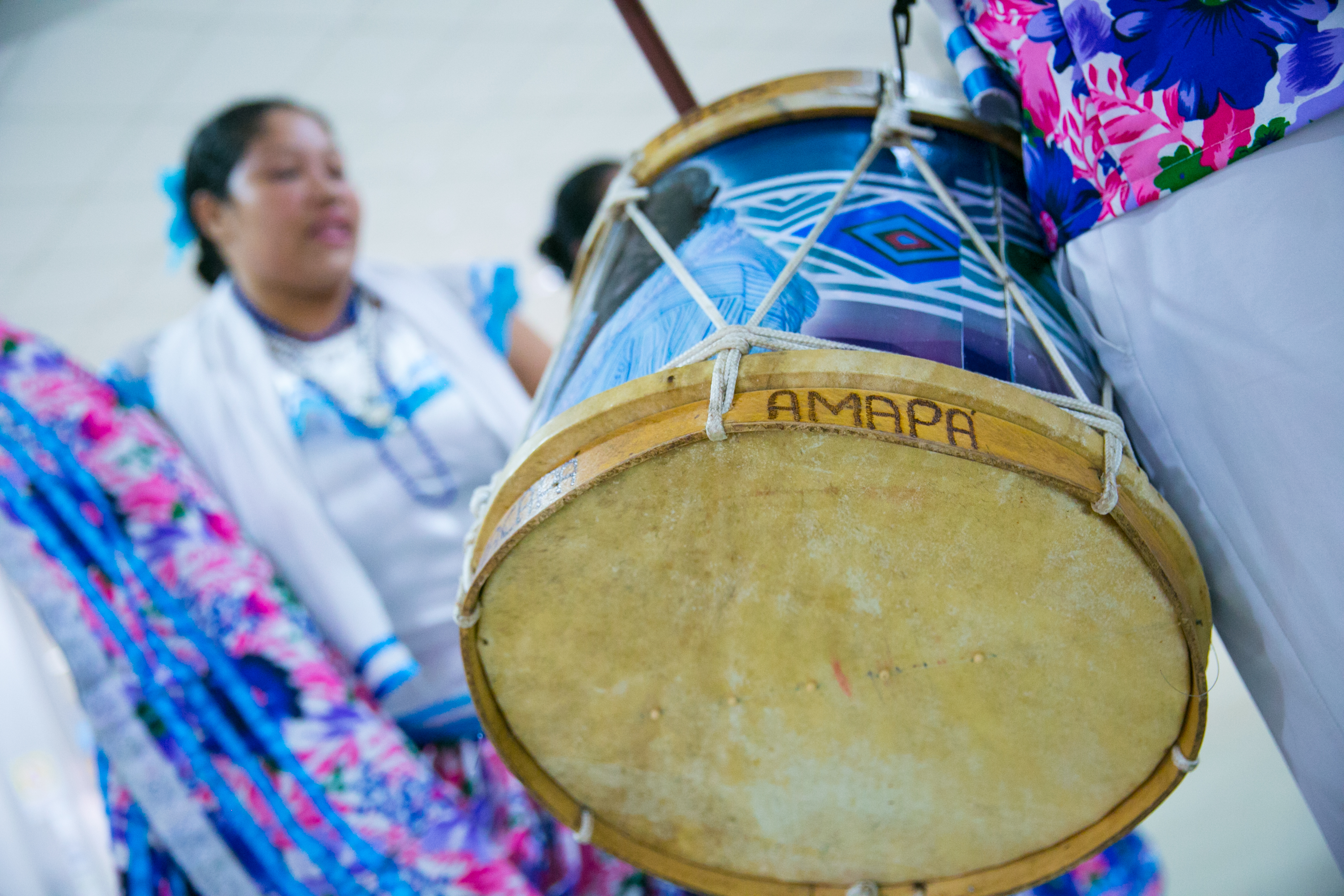
An image of a caixa de marabaixo.

The characteristic musical instrument of the marabaixo is the caixa de marabaixo (a type of drum), which, in most communities, is the sole instrument used during performances, although a few localities also employ rainsticks made of bamboo. The drum is typically crafted from hardwood, with a cylindrical body and animal-skin heads fastened at both ends by flexible wooden hoops. Sound is produced by striking the upper head with two drumsticks, causing vibrations that resonate against a nylon snare strung with beads, positioned near the lower head, which is essential for generating the instrument's distinctive timbre. Tuning is achieved through lateral attachments of rubber and cords. The drum is worn over the shoulder by a colorful thick strap during performance. The rhythms, known as dobrados or viradas, vary in tempo and complexity according to the song, the community—since Macapá, Mazagão Velho, and Maruanum each have distinct rhythmic styles—and the player's skill. A distinctive feature of the marabaixo is that the drummers move within the dance circle alongside the dancers, simultaneously playing and either leading or responding to the sung verses. A typical performance may include between three and seven drummers, who are generally men, although female drummers are also common.

The marabaixo is a circle dance in which the drummers position themselves at the center while the dancers move around them in a counterclockwise direction. Its characteristic step is a dragging motion of the feet, performed in rhythm with the drums, which is understood to evoke the memory of enslaved Africans who danced with their feet bound in chains. While all dancers follow this basic dragging step, each individual is free to develop their own variations and distinctive movements. Women dance with flowing skirts, executing a cadenced sequence of lateral, forward, backward, and spinning movements, with their arms either swaying naturally or raised during turns, while their hips sway and shift in multiple directions. Men, in turn, dance with a courting demeanor, incorporating movements described as full of "cunning, grace, and mischief", such as sudden crouches, shoulder shakes, and wide stances with small, dragging steps. In the past, the physical performance was restrained, as it recalled the chained ancestors, whereas today the dance expresses a proud, joyful, and confident posture, conveying a sense of affirmation and pride. Formerly, the marabaixo was also accompanied by a dance-fight known as carioca, described as a form of physical combat involving grappling and foot sweeps, similar to capoeira. Although the carioca itself disappeared from Macapá decades ago, its memory persists in the dance circles through movements that simulate martial play.

== See also ==
- Music of Brazil
- Afro-Brazilian music
- Carimbó
- Maracatu
- Tambor de Crioula
