= Nélson Jacobina =

Brazilian songwriter and guitarist (1953–2012)

- Born: Nélson Jacobina Rocha Pires; 1953; Rio de Janeiro, Brazil
- Died: May 31, 2012 (aged 58) Rio de Janeiro, Brazil
- Genres: MPB
- Occupations: Lyricist, songwriter, guitarist
- Instruments: Classical guitar, electric guitar, acoustic guitar
- Years active: 1970s–2012
- Formerly of: Jorge Mautner; Orquestra Imperial; Banda Atômica

Nélson Jacobina Rocha Pires (1953 – May 31, 2012) was a Brazilian lyricist, songwriter and guitarist, famous for his enduring partnership with fellow musician Jorge Mautner, with whom he wrote, among many other songs, the 1974 hit "Maracatu Atômico".

== Biography ==
Jacobina was born in Rio de Janeiro in 1953. His father, Nelcy Rocha Pires, was a chivalry officer for the Brazilian Army, and his mother, Eloá Jacobina, was a translator and screenwriter. Nelcy died in 1954, when Nélson was only 1 year old, and Eloá eventually remarried filmmaker Fernando Coni Campos. Nélson had three other brothers, one of them being Rubinho Jacobina, also a musician.

Jacobina discovered his vocation for music in the early 1970s, when he founded, alongside Vinicius Cantuária and Arnaldo Brandão, the MPB group Banda Atômica. In 1974 the group would open a show for Jorge Mautner, and since then Mautner and Jacobina became very close friends and musical partners; in the same year they wrote their first song together, "Maracatu Atômico". Initially performed by Mautner on his 1974 self-titled album, it would acquire higher success after being covered by Gilberto Gil and, even later, by pioneering Mangue Bit band Nação Zumbi. Among other hits written by the duo are "Lágrimas Negras" (performed by Gal Costa), "Balaio Grande" (performed by Dorival Caymmi) and "Andar com Fé" (performed by Gilberto Gil). In 1988 he and Mautner released the collaborative album Árvore da Vida. In 1997 they released another collaborative album, Estilhaços de Paixão, alongside Celso Sim.

In 2002 Jacobina served as a guest musician on synthpop band Metrô third studio album, Déjà-Vu, providing some acoustic guitar passages. Later on he founded the big band Orquestra Imperial alongside many other icons of MPB and Brazilian rock such as Rodrigo Amarante (of Los Hermanos fame), Moreno Veloso, Domenico Lancellotti, Alexandre Kassin, Nina Becker, Thalma de Freitas and Wilson das Neves. Jacobina served as the band's guitarist until 2012, when he died at age 58 of lung cancer on May 31; he was diagnosed with the disease as early as 2008. Orquestra Imperial had finished and released its second studio album a couple of months before Jacobina's death.
