= Jorge Mautner =

Brazilian singer-songwriter and author (born 1941)

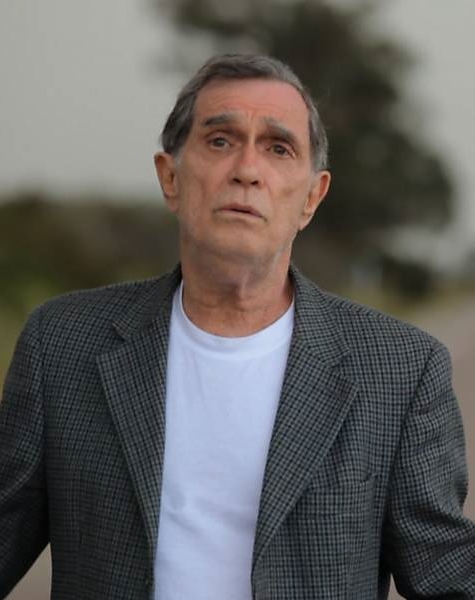
- Mautner in 2013
- Born: Henrique George Mautner; January 17, 1941 (age 85); Rio de Janeiro, Brazil
- Occupations: Singer-songwriter, lyricist, poet, screenwriter
- Years active: 1962–present
- Notable work: "Maracatu Atômico"; Deus da Chuva e da Morte; O Filho do Holocausto
- Spouse: Ruth Mendes (m. 1968)
- Children: Amora Mautner
- Awards: Prêmio Jabuti (1963); Latin Grammy Award (2003)
- Musical career
- Genre: MPB
- Instruments: Vocals, violin
- Labels: RCA Records, Phonogram Records, PolyGram, Philips Records, Rock Company Records, Primal Records, Universal Music Group, Dabliú Records, Warner Music Group, Deckdisc

Henrique George Mautner (born January 17, 1941), better known by his stage name Jorge Mautner, is a Brazilian singer-songwriter, lyricist, violinist, actor, screenwriter, and poet, considered to be a pioneer of the MPB scene and of the Tropicalista movement.

== Biography ==
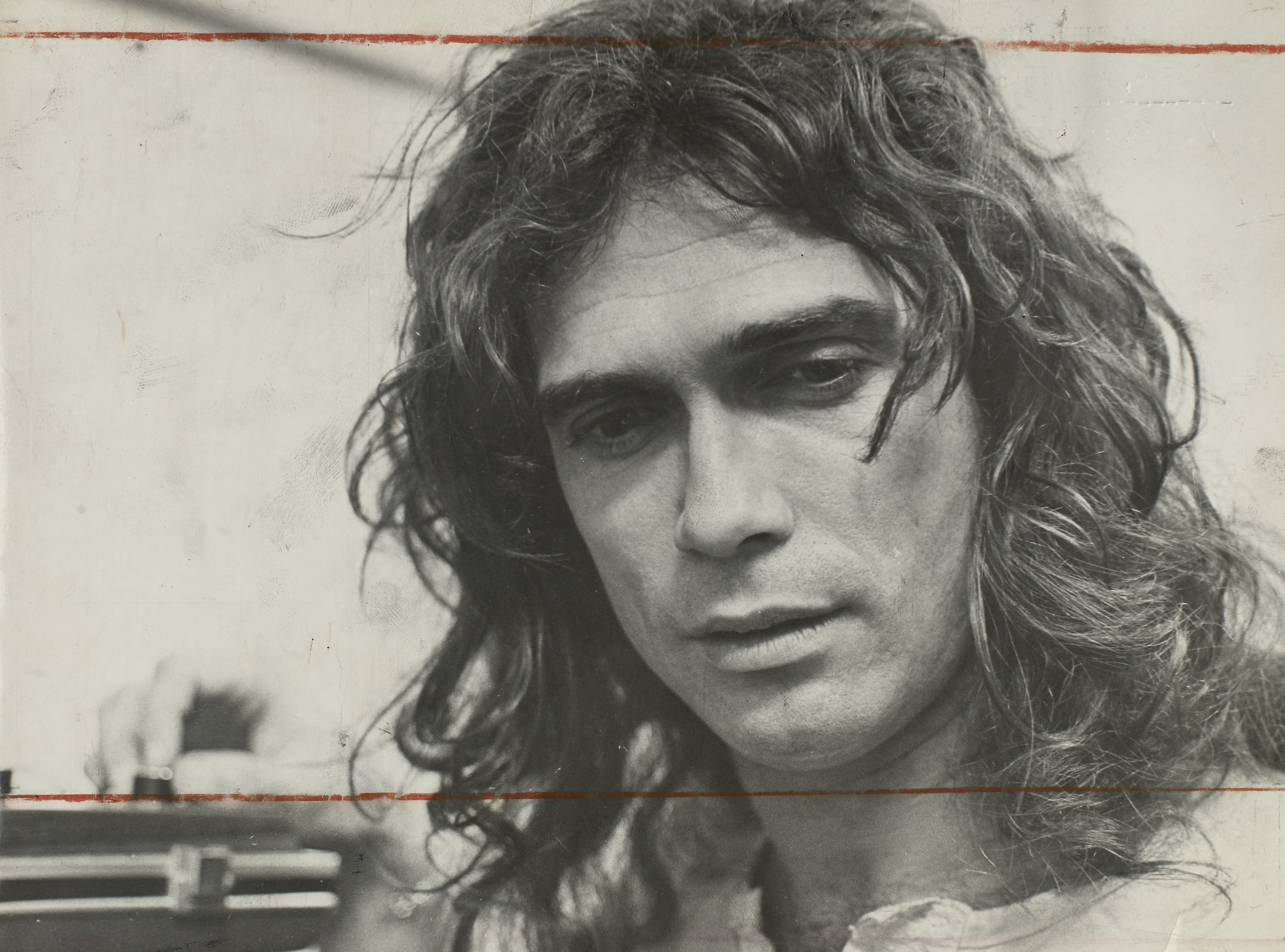
Mautner in 1972

Mautner was born in Rio de Janeiro on January 17, 1941, one month after his mother, Anna Illich, a Catholic Croat, and his father, Paul Mautner, an Austrian Jew, emigrated from Europe to Brazil to escape from the Holocaust. Despite being a sympathizer of Getúlio Vargas, Paul was a part of the Jewish underground resistance. Anna eventually suffered from a major paralysis due to a trauma caused by the fact that Jorge's sister, Susana, was not able to embark to Brazil with them, and so until he was 7 years old a nanny, Lúcia, took care of him; Lúcia was a mãe-de-santo, and introduced Jorge to Candomblé.

In 1948 Jorge's parents divorced, and Anna eventually remarried Henri Müller, a violinist who played for the São Paulo State Symphony, and who taught Jorge how to play the violin. His family later moved to São Paulo, where he studied at the prestigious Colégio Dante Alighieri; despite being an excellent student, he would, however, be expelled before he could graduate from high school because of a text he wrote, considered "indecent" by his teachers.

Mautner began to write his first book, Deus da Chuva e da Morte, when he was 15 years old; it was published in 1962, and in the following year it won the Prêmio Jabuti. Deus da Chuva e da Morte would be the first part of what is today known as his Mitologia do Kaos trilogy, which also comprises Kaos (1963) and Narciso em Tarde Cinza (1965). In it, Mautner would define the main ideology of what he calls the "Kaos Movement".

In 1962 he joined the Brazilian Communist Party, after being invited by Mário Schenberg.

Mautner was arrested during the 1964 Brazilian coup d'état, but was later released, under the conditions of "expressing himself more carefully". In 1966 he recorded his first musical release, the 7" single "Radioatividade", through RCA Records. Soon after he travelled to the United States, where he worked for the UNESCO and as a translator of Brazilian books. He later met poet Robert Lowell, serving as his secretary, as well as Paul Goodman, with whom he developed a strong friendship and suffered an everlasting influence from him.

In 1968 he briefly returned to Brazil, where he worked as screenwriter on Neville d'Almeida's film Jardim de Guerra, that was only released two years later.

In 1970 he travelled to London, where he befriended Gilberto Gil and Caetano Veloso. He later returned to Brazil, settling in Rio de Janeiro once more, where he began to write for the humoristic newspaper O Pasquim. In the same year he directed the film O Demiurgo, which starred himself, Gil, Veloso, José Roberto Aguilar, Péricles Cavalcanti and Leilah Assunção. The film was censored by the dictatorship though, and never received a wide release. (In 2013 Mautner made the film available in its entirety through his official YouTube channel.) Around the same time he met Nélson Jacobina, one of his most prolific songwriting partners, with whom he wrote, among many other songs, the 1974 hit "Maracatu Atômico".

On December 10, 1973, Mautner was invited to partake in the Banquete dos Mendigos "show-manifesto", idealized and directed by Jards Macalé. The show, that happened at the Museum of Modern Art of Rio de Janeiro and was backed by the UN, celebrated the 25th anniversary of the Universal Declaration of Human Rights, and also counted with the presence of Chico Buarque, Dominguinhos, Edu Lobo, Gal Costa, Gonzaguinha, Johnny Alf, Luiz Melodia, Milton Nascimento, MPB4, Nélson Jacobina, Paulinho da Viola and Raul Seixas, among others. It spawned a double-disc live album, which due to censorship issues was only released in 1979.

In 1988 Mautner took part in a short-lived "joke side project" formed by then-Titãs member Arnaldo Antunes named Vestidos de Espaço, which also comprised Branco Mello, Charles Gavin, Paula Toller of Kid Abelha and record producer Liminha. The band's only release before their demise in the following year was a 7" single with the tracks "Pipi Popô" and "A Marcha do Demo"; the latter was included in the Titãs compilation album E-collection from 2000.

In 2002 Mautner served as a guest musician on synth-pop band Metrô's third album, Déjà-Vu, providing violin and additional vocals for a track. In the same year he released a collaborative album with Caetano Veloso, Eu Não Peço Desculpa, which won the Latin Grammy Award in 2003.

A documentary about Mautner, directed by Pedro Bial and Heitor d'Alincourt, was released in 2012 to positive reception, entitled Jorge Mautner: O Filho do Holocausto; it was inspired by his autobiography of the same name, published in 2006. In the same year he collaborated with Rogério Skylab in his album Abismo e Carnaval, writing the lyrics and providing additional vocals for the track "Palmeira Brasileira".

On January 17, 2016, coinciding with his 75th birthday, Mautner published his eleventh book, Kaos Total.

On July 28, 2016, it was reported that Mautner suffered a heart attack and was rushed to the Hospital Samaritano in Rio. He underwent a surgery to implant four stents into his heart, but eventually recovered. One month later, on August 30, he announced that he began work on a 10-volume series of books about his years as a militant for the Brazilian Communist Party during the mid-1960s.

In 2017 Mautner appeared in Laís Bodanzky's film Just Like Our Parents as Homero Fabri.

In April 2019 he released his first studio album in 12 years, entitled Não Há Abismo em que o Brasil Caiba. One of the album's tracks is a tribute to feminist/LGBT activist Marielle Franco, murdered in 2018. The album was considered one of the 25 best Brazilian albums of the first half of 2019 by the São Paulo Association of Art Critics.

== Personal life ==
In 1968 he married historian Ruth Mendes, with whom he had a daughter, Amora (born 1975), who became a famous telenovela director.

== Discography ==
=== Studio albums ===
Year	Album
1972	Para Iluminar a Cidade: Label: Phonogram; Format: Vinyl
1974	Jorge Mautner: Label: Polydor; Format: Vinyl
1976	Mil e Uma Noites de Bagdá: Label: Philips Records; Format: Vinyl
1981	Bomba de Estrelas: Label: WEA; Format: Vinyl
1985	Antimaldito: Label: PolyGram; Format: Vinyl
1988	Árvore da Vida: Label: WEA; Format: Vinyl; Collaborative album with Nélson Jacobina
1992	Pedra Bruta: Label: Rock Company Records; Format: Vinyl
1997	Estilhaços de Paixão: Label: Primal Records; Format: CD; Collaborative album with Nélson Jacobina and Celso Sim
2002	Eu Não Peço Desculpa: Label: Universal Music Group; Format: CD; Collaborative album with Caetano Veloso
2007	Revirão: Label: Warner Music Group; Format: CD
2019	Não Há Abismo em que o Brasil Caiba: Label: Deckdisc; Format: CD, digital download

=== Compilations ===
Year	Album
1999	O Ser da Tempestade: Label: Dabliú Records; Format: CD

=== Live albums ===
Year	Album
1979	O Banquete dos Mendigos: Label: RCA; Format: Vinyl; Originally recorded in 1973; contributed with track "Samba dos Animais"
2014	Para Detonar a Cidade: Label: Discobertas; Format: CD; Originally recorded in 1972

=== Singles ===
Year	Single	Album
1966	"Radioatividade"	Non-album song
1974	"Maracatu Atômico"	Jorge Mautner

=== As a session member ===
Metrô

- 2002: Déjà-Vu (violin; additional vocals in "Leva Meu Samba")

Rogério Skylab

- 2012: Abismo e Carnaval (lyrics and additional vocals in "Palmeira Brasileira")

== Bibliography ==
- 1962: Deus da Chuva e da Morte: Mitologia do Kaos, Vol. I (Editora Martins; re-issued in 2002 by Azougue Editorial)
- 1963: Kaos: Mitologia do Kaos, Vol. II (Editora Martins; re-issued in 2002 by Azougue Editorial)
- 1965: Narciso em Tarde Cinza: Mitologia do Kaos, Vol. III (Editora Exposição do Livro; re-issued in 2002 by Azougue Editorial)
- 1965: Vigarista Jorge (Von Schmidt Editora; re-issued in 2002 by Azougue Editorial)
- 1973: Fragmentos de Sabonete (Editora Relume-Dumará; re-issued in 2002 by Azougue Editorial)
- 1978: Panfletos da Nova Era (Editora Global; re-issued in 2002 by Azougue Editorial)
- 1985: Fundamentos do Kaos (Ched Editorial; re-issued in 2002 by Azougue Editorial)
- 1993: Miséria Dourada (Editora Maltese; re-issued in 2002 by Azougue Editorial)
- 2002: Floresta Verde-Esmeralda (Azougue Editorial)
- 2006: O Filho do Holocausto (Editora Agir)
- 2016: Kaos Total (Companhia das Letras)

== Books about author ==
- 2004: MORAIS JUNIOR, Luís Carlos de. Proteu ou: A Arte das Transmutações. Leituras, audições e visões da obra de Jorge Mautner (Editora HP Comunicação; re-issued in 2011 by Editora Litteris)
- 2004: Jorge Mautner em movimento (Edited by César Resac)
