= Jorge Mautner: O Filho do Holocausto =

2012 film directed by Pedro Bial

Jorge Mautner - O Filho do Holocausto
- Directed by: Pedro Bial; Heitor D'Alincourt
- Written by: Pedro Bial
- Produced by: Tereza Alvarez; Luciano Araújo
- Starring: Gilberto Gil; Nelson Jacobina; Jorge Mautner; Caetano Veloso
- Edited by: Leyda Nápoles
- Music by: Jorge Mautner
- Production company: Canal Brasil
- Distributed by: H2O Filmes
- Release dates: March 23, 2012 (It's All True Festival); February 1, 2013 (Brazil)
- Running time: 93 minutes
- Country: Brazil
- Language: Portuguese
- Budget: R$ 100,000

Jorge Mautner - O Filho do Holocausto is a 2012 Brazilian documentary film directed by Pedro Bial and Heitor D’Alincourt.

The film follows the birth of Jorge Mautner up to his 17 years. He was born in Brazil shortly after his parents fled the Holocaust. Raised by a nanny who introduced him to Candomblé, Mautner became a precursor of the Tropicália, contributing to the construction of the identity of Brazilian music.

== Cast ==
- Gilberto Gil
- Caetano Veloso
- Jorge Mautner
- José Roberto Aguilar
- Maria Elisabeth Ildiko De Fiore
- Maria Helena Guimarães
- Nélson Jacobina
- Ottaviano De Fiore
- Ruth Mautner
- Susanne Bial
