= Gonguê =

Brazilian percussion instrument

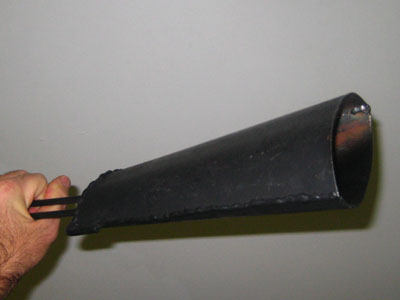

Percussion
- Other names: Gonguê bell
- Classification: Percussion
- Hornbostel–Sachs classification: 111.242.11 (Resting bells whose opening faces upward)

Related instruments
- Agogô; Alfaia

Gonguê (or Gonguê bell) is a Brazilian percussion instrument. It is a type of cowbell consisting of a big, flat iron bell, measuring from 20–30 centimetres (7.9–11.8 in), and a cable that serves as a support. The Gonguê is usually played with a metal drumstick, and it is typically used in north-eastern Brazilian music, accentuating the beats and doing rhythmic phrases, generally formed by off-beats and syncopated patterns. To avoid fatigue, players normally support it against the body. Due to its size, the Gonguê has a loud and strident sound, more clangorous than other types of cowbells.

== See also ==
- Maracatu
- Agogô
- Alfaia
