= Mangue bit =

Brazilian cultural movement

Manguebeat
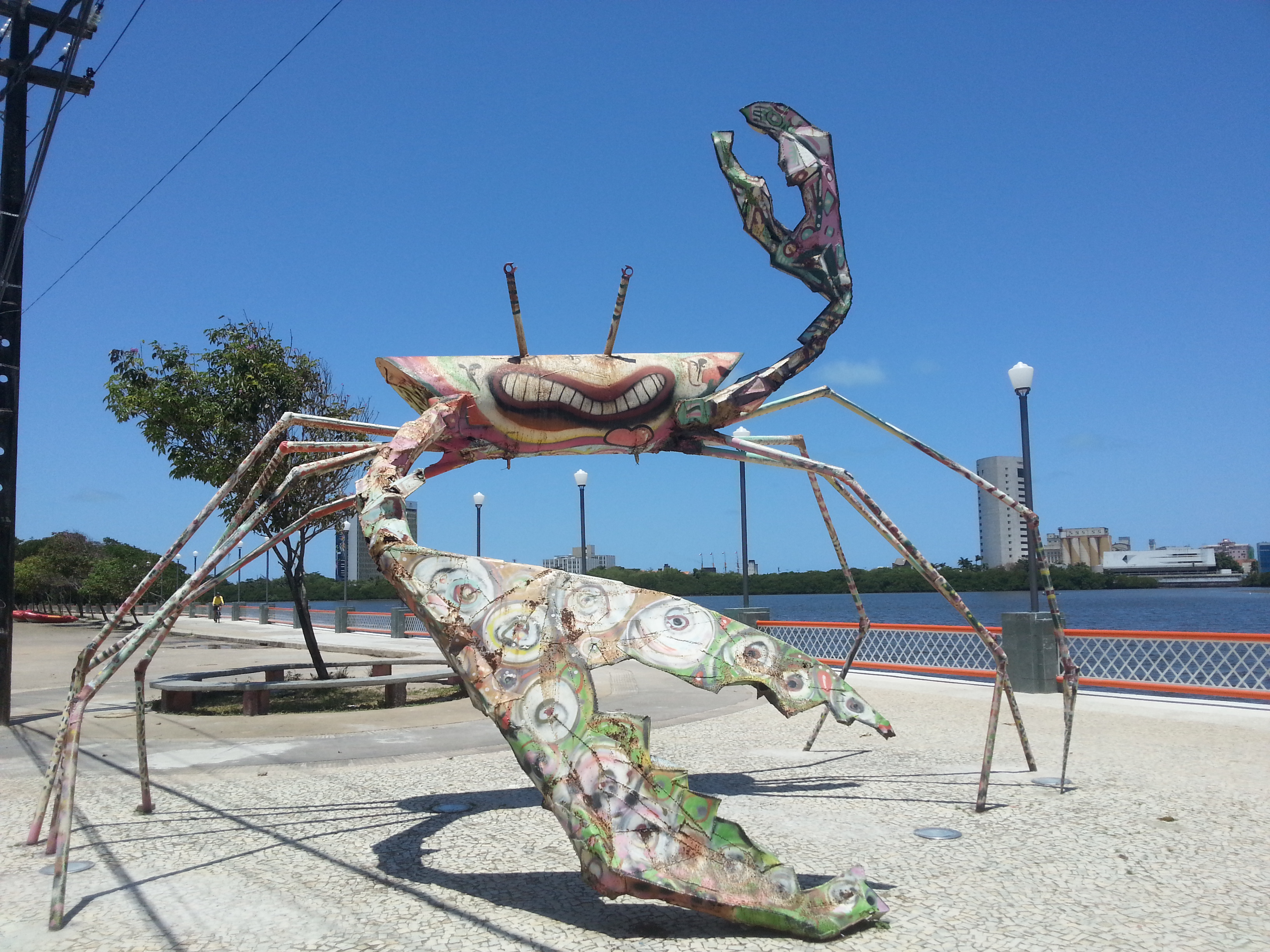
- Caranguejo represents the musical genre Manguebeat statue is located on Rua da Aurora in the city center of Recife.
- Native name: Manguebeat
- Etymology: "Mangrove Swamp"
- Other names: Manguebeat, Mangue
- Stylistic origins: Alternative rock; maracatu; frevo; coco; forró; embolada; funk; hip hop; ragga; soul; electronica
- Cultural origins: Early 1990s, Northeast Brazil

Manguebeat, alternatively known as mangue beat or mangue bit, is a social and artistic movement with origins in northeastern Brazilian city Recife, Pernambuco in the early 1900s, in reaction to the economic and cultural stagnation of the capital.

Even though the movement has a strong focus on music, it also spans fashion, slang and visual art. Manguebeat compositions are known for their mix of regional rhythms, like maracatu, frevo, coco and forró, with international genres like rock, soul, raggamuffin, hip hop, funk and electronic music.

== Overview ==
The movement has its own manifesto, Caranguejos com Cérebro (English: Crabs with Brains), written in 1991 by singer Fred 04 and DJ Renato L (Renato Lin). The crabs act as a metaphor for Recife's citizens, given that the capital is built over a mangrove biome. The mangrove also symbolizes Recife's cultural richness, stagnated but very much alive. A major symbol associated with mangue bit is that of an antenna stuck in the mud receiving signals from all over the world.

Mangue bit can be divided into two distinct waves: the first in the early 1990s led by the music groups Chico Science & Nação Zumbi (Zumbi's Nation) and Mundo Livre S/A (Free World Inc.), and the second in the early 2000s led by Re:Combo (a copyleft movement that uploads half-sampled music for download) and Cordel do Fogo Encantado, a music group that started as a roving theatre troupe with roots in literatura de cordel.

The original movement named itself mangue bit, mangue referring to Recife's mangroves and bit to the computer bit central to the movement's electronic music influences. Since then, mangue bit has commonly, albeit mistakenly, been referred as mangue beat.

== History ==
=== Origin ===
The basis for Mangue started towards the end of Brazil's military dictatorship at the beginning of the 1980s. The relaxation of censorship increased the availability of imported music, especially from the United States and the United Kingdom, leading to an increase of Brazilian-made rock music. In Recife, university students, including some of the founding characters of the movement, DJ Renato L. and Fred 04, started a radio show called Décadas, further facilitating the influence of rock music, especially underground music from England, leading to a large increase in Recife-based rock bands. Fred 04 notes that when Mundo Livre S/A began in 1984, poor economic circumstances and the lack of a music circuit in Recife, made it especially difficult for them, and similar music groups to find places to play. In the early 90s, Paulo Andre Pires, who would become Nação Zumbi's impresario, began producing shows in Recife and invited both local and international bands to perform.

Despite being both being cited as founders for the Mangue movement, Chico Science and Nação Zumbi (CSNZ), and Mundo Livre S/A have different influences and backgrounds. Chico Science was born to a lower-middle-class family in the neighborhood of Rio Doce in the city of Olinda. His influences came from music he heard while attending baile funk parties as a youth and included early rap, hip-hop, rock and soul such as, James Brown, Curtis Mayfield, Funkadelic, Sugar Hill Gang, Kurtis Blow, and Grand Master Flash. Having grown up being surrounded by regional folk music he also was heavily influenced by music of Recife such as maracatu, ciranda, embolada, and côco. Chico with his friend, Jorge du Peixe, joined several groups; Legião Hip Hop, Orla Orbe, and Loustal, before finding and meeting members of Lamento Negro, a bloco afro specializing in samba-reggae, in 1990 and forming what would be CSNZ.

Mundo Livre S/A was based in the neighborhood of Candeias, a wealthy area of Olinda. While the band members themselves weren't wealthy, they were all firmly middle class as opposed to Chico Science and members of Nação Zumbi. Lead singer Fred 04, described the idea for the band as "a fusion, a bridge between Johnny Rotten [of the punk band. the Sex Pistols] and Jorge Ben [a pioneering Brazilian pop musician who fuses funk. soul. and samba] and Moreira da Silva [a samba musician from the 1930s and '40s], understand? .... It would be a type of new wave but very Brazilian, really very Brazilian, that would be identified neither as rock nor as MPB [an acronym for Música Popular Brasileira, "Brazilian Popular Music"]".

When first hearing Chico Science in a mashup performance of Loustal and Lamento Negro, he thought the combination of the local/global juxtaposition, as well as the difference in geographical location, could launch what would become the Mangue movement into something that would highlight Recife's diversity.

=== Manifesto Mangue ===
The Mangue manifesto, titled "Caranguejos Com Cérebro" (Crabs with Brains), was written by Fred 04 and Renato L. and distributed to the press in 1991. Though his name is not listed as an author when the manifesto was printed, Chico Science likely played a role in its creation. When naming Mangue, Chico Science initially used it solely to describe the fusion of genres and sounds used by Loustal and Lamento Negro. However, soon the word changed to describe more than the specific sound. DJ Renato L. describes Mangue as

"a label that we used for a type of cultural cooperative . . . that united some bands [particularly Nação Zumbi and Mundo Livre S/A], some visual artists, some journalists, some unemployed. And the idea, the label mangue emerged because Recife is a city that is constructed on top of the manguezais ["mangrove swamps"]. Our idea at the time [in the early ’90s] was to try to create a cultural scene here in Recife that was as rich and diversified as the mangue swamps, because the swamps are perhaps the ecosystem that has the greatest biodiversity of the planet. So the idea was to create a cultural scene . . . that had the same diversity, that wasn’t tied down to a single rhythm, a single style, or single fashion".

That diversity is emphasized in the Mangue manifesto. It is divided into three parts: "Mangue - the Concept", which talks about the biodiversity of the mangue swamps and its importance as an ecosystem to the people of Recife, "Manguetown-The City", which describes a bit of Recife's history and economic situation as being rated one of the worst cities in the world to live in, with a high rate of unemployment and a high rate of people living in slums, and "Mangue-The Scene", which introduces the Mangue movement as a way to inject energy back into the city of Recife and connect it to the circulation of music on a global scale. The named symbol for the movement is "a parabolic antenna put in the mud. Or a caranguejo [crab] remixing ANTHENA by Kraftwerk [a Euro-tech group] on the computer." The idea of the manifesto was to parallel the biodiversity of the mangue to the cultural diversity within Recife and to resuscitate the music and cultural scene, by mixing elements of globally circulating music with elements of regional music.

As a result of the manifesto being published, in 1992 MTV visited Recife to interview both Chico Science and Fred 04. The resulting footage played on MTV in Brazil, in January 1993, causing Mangue to gain traction in the south of Brazil. That same year, Paulo Andre Pires launched the first Abril pro Rock festival in Recife featuring CSNZ and Mundo Livre S/A as well as Nacão Pernambuco, a maracatu band that was gaining attention and growing quickly in popularity. The festival had a total audience of 1,500 people. CSNZ and Mundo Livre quickly found success in the music industry after the festival. Both bands toured in São Paulo and Minas Gerais and were picked up by record labels; CSNZ by Sony music, and Mundo Livre by Banguela, which was also the label that was producing music for band Titãs, and both bands produced their first CDs by 1994.
