= Chico Science =

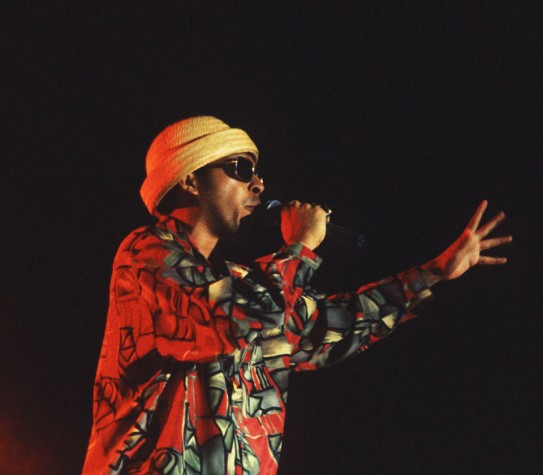
- Chico Science in 1993.

Background information
- Born: Francisco de Assis França; March 13, 1966; Olinda, Pernambuco, Brazil
- Origin: Olinda, Brazil
- Died: February 2, 1997 (aged 30) Recife, Pernambuco, Brazil
- Genres: Manguebeat, post-punk, brazilian rock, punk rock
- Occupations: Singer, songwriter
- Instruments: Vocals; sampler
- Years active: 1980–1997
- Label: Sony Music

Francisco de Assis França (March 13, 1966 – February 2, 1997), known as Chico Science, was a Brazilian singer and composer and one of the founders of the manguebeat cultural movement. He died in a car accident in 1997 in Recife, Pernambuco, at the age of 30.

== Biography ==
Francisco de Assis França was born in the Rio Doce neighborhood of Olinda, Pernambuco, in Brazil's Northeast Region. As a little boy he would sell crabs that he caught himself in the city's mangrove swamps.

He became the lead singer and major creative driving force of the Mangue Bit band called Chico Science & Nação Zumbi (CSNZ). Influenced by such musicians as James Brown, Grandmaster Flash and Kurtis Blow, their music fused rock, funk, and hip hop with maracatu and other traditional rhythms of Brazil's Northeast. World music critics found his music "original and distinctive of his region." Chico had a powerful stage presence that was compared by some to that of Jimi Hendrix.

Around 1991, Chico Science, along with singer Fred 04 of the band Mundo Livre S/A, founded the Mangue Bit cultural movement in response to dire economic and cultural stagnation in Recife and Olinda. CSNZ made their US debut at New York's Central Park Summerstage in 1995, opening for Gilberto Gil, with whom he collaborated during the encore. While in NY, they also performed additional shows at CBGB's, SOB's and at Bryant Park as part of the JVC Jazz Festival, on a bill with the Ohio Players.

Chico Science & Nação Zumbi toured several times in Europe and brought massive attention to the new generation of Brazilian artists in the 1990s. With only two full albums released during his lifetime, 'Da Lama Ao Caos' ('From Mud To Chaos) and 'Afrociberdelia', his influence and vision became the foundation to a whole new generation of musicians in Brazil. At the time of his death, The New York Times said he was "widely hailed as the future of Brazilian music." The Governor of the Brazilian state of Pernambuco declared three days of mourning.

In 1996, Chico Science contributed Maracatu Atômico along with Nação Zumbi to the AIDS-Benefit Album Red Hot + Rio produced by the Red Hot Organization. Nação Zumbi have continued to record and tour internationally after Chico's death.

== Death ==
Chico Science died in a car accident on February 2, 1997. He lost control of his Fiat Uno and hit a side light post after another car cut him off. He was rescued alive but he did not survive his injuries. He was buried on February 3 in Cemitério de Santo Amaro located in Recife. 10 years after his death, his family was compensated by Fiat due to a failure in the seatbelt that could have saved his life.

== Legacy ==
In 2008, Rolling Stone Brasil ranked Chico Science as the 16th greatest Brazilian artist in their list of the 100 greatest artists of all time in Brazilian music

== Discography ==
- 1994: Da lama ao caos
- 1996: Afrociberdelia
- 1998: CSNZ (posthumous)
