= Coco (music) =

Music genre from Brazil

Coco is an African-influenced musical rhythm that originated in northern Brazil. Coco may also refer to the style of dance performed to the music, a kind of stomping. Coco is also alternatively known as embolada (another slang word, meaning 'entangling', referring to the fast, slurred, machine-gun style of singing). Coco is often performed with a repetitive musical beat and call and response singing, reminiscent of Capoeira music. The music is commonly performed at traditional parties in the Northeast, such as weekend street parties and Carnival.

The characteristic sound of coco arises from four instruments commonly used in its performance: the ganzá, surdo, pandeiro, and triangle. Performers also often wear wooden clogs, the stomping of which adds a fifth percussive element.

The name Coco (Portuguese for 'coconut') is a common Northeastern Brazilian slang for head, referring to the fact that song lyrics are often improvised.

== Origins ==
The origins of coco are as obscure as most Brazilian folk music, but some theories do exist. One theory is that the predecessor to the music was originally brought to Brazil by slaves from Angola, who then created coco by merging their music with local indigenous rhythms. Another theory is that coco was created by Brazilian slaves who broke coconuts with rocks for their masters.

== Examples on the web ==
- Coco being performed at "Terça Negra" (Black Tuesday) in São Pedro square in Recife
