= Mundo Livre S/A =

Brazilian mangue bit band

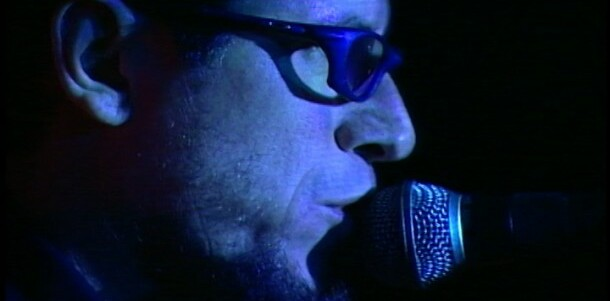
- Fred Zero Quatro (Jaboatão dos Guararapes, July 11, 1965) is a Brazilian composer and singer. He is the vocalist and main composer of the Pernambuco group Mundo Livre S

Background information
- Origin: Recife, Pernambuco, Brazil
- Genres: Manguebeat
- Years active: 1994-present
- Members: Fred 04; P3dr0 Diniz; Xef Tony; Léo D. Pedro Santana
- Website: www.mundolivresa.com

Mundo Livre S/A is a Brazilian mangue bit band, formed in 1984 in Jaboatão dos Guararapes, Pernambuco. It is also one of the pioneers of that musical style, which became popular in the 1990s.

Their name translates as "Free World" and was based on speeches by former US president Ronald Reagan.

Mundo Livre S/A was founded at the Candeias neighborhood of Jaboatão dos Guararapes, the same place where the Caranguejos com Cérebro manifesto was written, which is considered a milestone of the Manguebeat movement. which advocates for the music of Pernambuco, their state of origin. Fred 04, the vocalist, authored the manifesto, along with Renato L. and Chico Science.

== Members ==
- Fred Zero Quatro, lead singer, guitar and cavaquinho
- P3dr0 Diniz, bass
- Xef Tony, drums
- Léo D., keyboard
- Pedro Santana, percussion

=== Former Members ===
- Otto, percussion
- Bactéria, Keyboards and Guitar
- Areia, bass
- Tom Rocha, percussion

== Discography ==
- 1994 - Samba Esquema Noise
- 1996 - Guentando a Ôia
- 1998 - Carnaval Na Obra
- 2000 - Por Pouco
- 2004 - O Outro Mundo de Manuela Rosário
- 2005 - Bebadogroove
- 2008 - Combat Samba - E se a gente sequestrasse o trem das 11?
- 2011 - Novas Lendas da Etnia Toshi Babaa
- 2017 - A Dança dos Não Famosos
- 2022 - Walking Dead Folia
