= Nação Zumbi =

Brazilian band

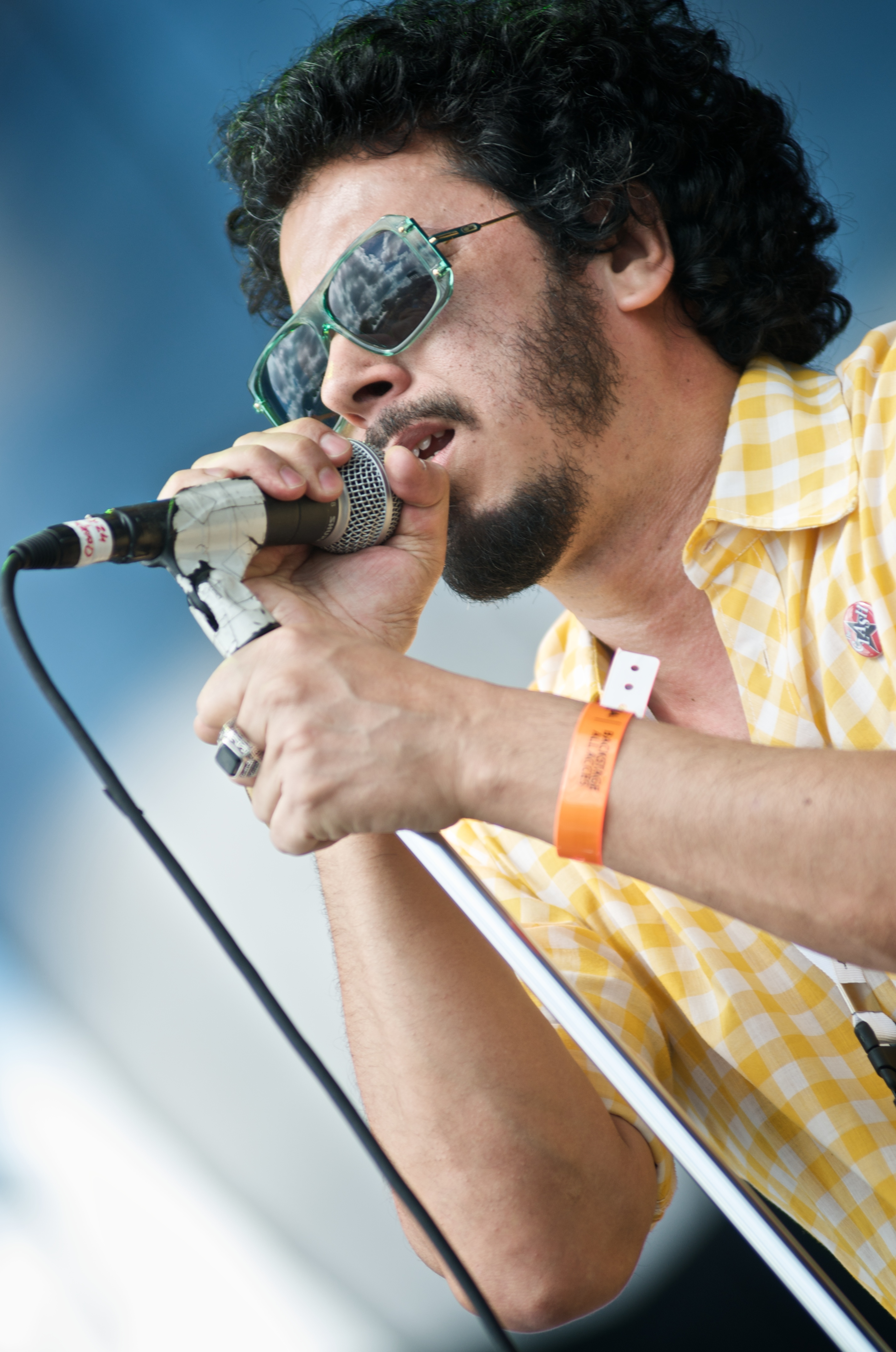
- Nação Zumbi live at Maquinária Festival.

Background information
- Also known as: Chico Science & Nação Zumbi (1992–1997)
- Origin: Recife, Pernambuco, Brazil
- Genres: Manguebeat; art rock; punk rock
- Years active: 1992–2022; 2023–present
- Labels: Sony Music, Trama, YB Music
- Members: Jorge Du Peixe; Alexandre Dengue; Toca Ogam
- Past members: Chico Science; Lucio Maia; Canhoto; Gira; Kuki Storlaski; Ramon Lira; Gilmar Bola 8 Pupillo
- Website: http://www.nacaozumbi.com.br/

Nação Zumbi (formerly Chico Science & Nação Zumbi) is a Brazilian band formed by Chico Science. They have been hailed as one of the most important groups to come out of the manguebeat movement in the 1990s. The musicians of the group continued as Nação Zumbi after Science died in a car accident on February 2, 1997.

In their songs they experiment with mixing of rock, punk, funk, hip hop, soul, Pernambuco's regional rhythms and Brazilian traditional music, with heavy use of percussion instruments.

They released two albums before the time of Chico's death, Da lama ao caos (From Mud to Chaos) in 1994 and Afrociberdelia in 1996. Both received critical acclaim.

In 1996, Nação Zumbi contributed Maracatu Atômico to the AIDS-Benefit Album Red Hot + Rio produced by the Red Hot Organization.

== Members ==
=== Current members ===
- Jorge Du Peixe – alfaia (1992–1997), vocals, sampler (1998–2022; 2023–present)
- Alexandre Dengue – bass, backing vocals (1992–2022; 2023–present)
- Toca Ogam – percussion, vocals (1992–2022; 2023–present)

=== Former members ===
- Chico Science – vocals, sampler (1992–1997; died 1997)
- Lúcio Maia – guitar, backing vocals (1992–2022)
- Canhoto – snare drum (1992–1995)
- Gira – alfaia (1993–2000)
- Gilmar Bola 8 – alfaia, percussion (1993–2015)
- Kuki Storlaski – drums (1995)
- Pupillo – drums, percussion (1995–2018)
- Marcos Matias – alfaia (1998–2011)
- Ramon Lira – alfaia (2011–2012)

=== Touring and session musicians ===
- Gustavo Da Lua – alfaia, percussion
- Marcos Matias – alfaia, percussion
- Tom Rocha – alfaia, percussion (2013–2018), drums (2018–present)
- Zi Ferreira – guitar (2022, support member)
- Neilton Carvalho – guitar (2023–present)

== Discography ==
- 1994: Da Lama ao Caos - Gold
- 1996: Afrociberdelia - Gold
- 1998: CSNZ
- 2000: Rádio S.AMB.A
- 2002: Nação Zumbi
- 2005: Futura
- 2007: Fome de tudo
- 2014: Nação Zumbi
- 2026: Outro Carnaval
