= Alfaia =

Brazilian membranophone

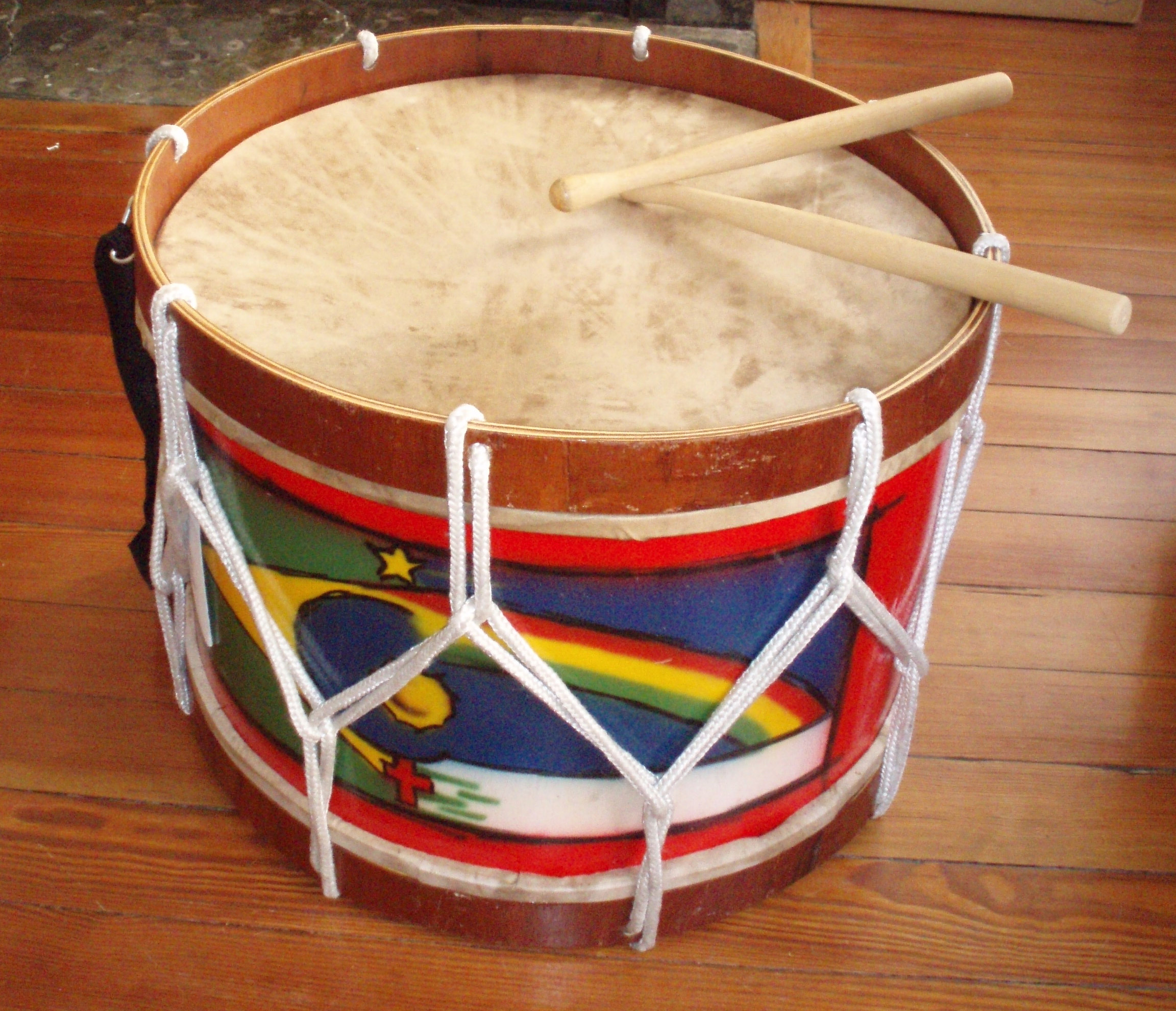

Percussion instrument
- Classification: Membranophone
- Hornbostel–Sachs classification: 211.212.1 (Cylindrical drums with two usable membranes)
- Developed: Brazil

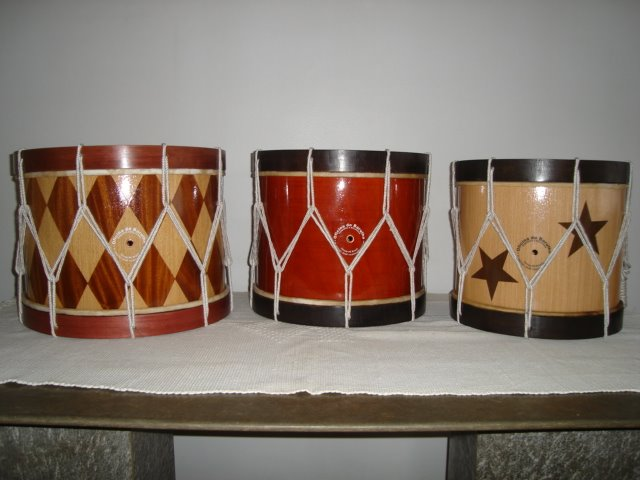
Different sized Alfaias

The alfaia is a Brazilian membranophone. It is a wooden drum made of animal skin tensioned or loosened through ropes placed alongside the body of the instrument.

Alfaias are usually between 40 centimetres (16 in) and 55 centimetres (22 in) in diameter. Their construction is similar to 19th-century American and European military or field drums, and Latin American wooden bass drums. Their drumheads are clamped to the body through large wooden hoops, and they are played with distinctly-shaped thick wooden drum sticks. Sometimes the stick used in the dominant hand is marginally larger than the one used in the weak hand.

Traditionally strapped over the shoulder, alfaias are played with a distinctive technique in which players hold the weak-hand drum stick inverted to get the proper attack on the head. Alfaias are also known as "Rope-surdos" or "Maracatu-drums", and the largest ones are called "Alfaias-marcantes". The medium-sized drums are called "Alfaia-meião". The alfaia has a characteristic deep, heavy sound, different from other bass drums such as the surdo or kick-drum, and they are used mainly in the Northeastern folk rhythms and dances of Brazil, such as maracatu, ciranda and coco-de-roda.
