= Maracatu =

Music genre from the northeast region of Brazil

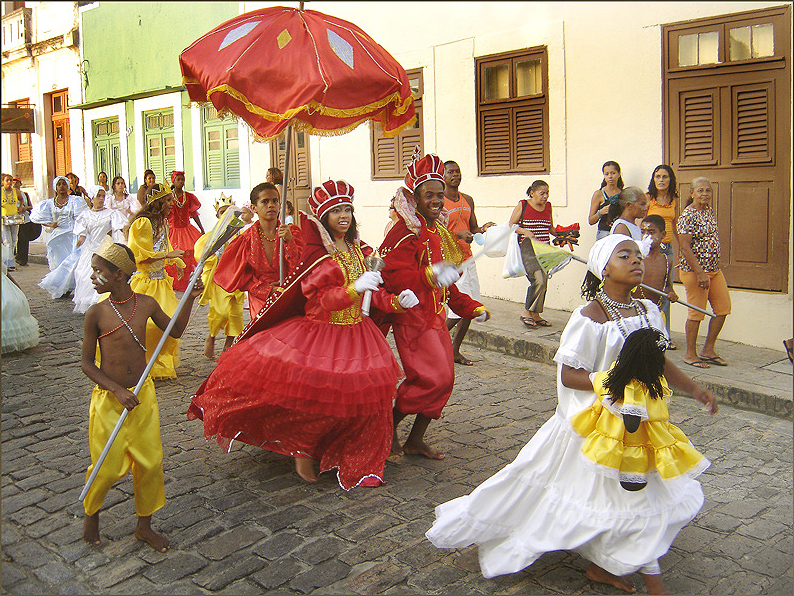
Maracatu nação dancers

The term maracatu denotes any of several performance genres found in Pernambuco, Northeastern Brazil. Main types of maracatu include maracatu nação (nation-style maracatu) and maracatu rural (rural-style maracatu).

== Maracatu Nação ==
Maracatu nação (also known as maracatu de baque virado: "maracatu of the turned-around beat"), the most well-known of the maracatu genres, is an Afro-Brazilian performance genre practiced in the state of Pernambuco, mainly in the cities of Recife and Olinda. The term, often shortened simply to nação ("nation", pl. nações), refers not only to the performance but to the performing groups themselves.

Maracatu nação’s origins lie in the investiture ceremonies of the Reis do Congo (Kings of Congo), who were enslaved people who were granted leadership roles within the enslaved community by the Portuguese administration. When slavery was abolished in Brazil in 1888, the institution of the Kings of Congo ceased to exist. Nonetheless, nações continued to choose symbolic leaders and evoke coronation ceremonies for those leaders. Although a maracatu performance is secular, traditional nações are grouped around Candomblé or Jurema (Afro-Brazilian religions) terreiros (bases), and the principles of Candomblé infuse their activities.

Traditional nações perform by parading with a drumming group of 80–100, a singer and chorus, and a coterie of dancers and stock characters including a king and a queen. Dancers and stock characters dress and behave to imitate the Portuguese royal court of the Baroque period.

The performance also enacts pre-colonial African traditions, like parading the calunga, a doll representing tribal deities that is kept throughout the year in a special place in the nação's headquarters. The calungas, usually female, are traditionally made of either wax and wood or of cloth. They may have clothing made for them in a similar Baroque style to the costumes worn by the other members of the royal court. The calunga is sacred, and carrying this spiritual figurehead of the group is a great responsibility for the female Dama de Paço (Lady-in-Waiting) of the cortège.

The musical ensemble consists of alfaia (a large wooden rope-tuned drum), gonguê (a metal cowbell), tarol (a shallow snare drum), caixa-de-guerra (or "war-snare"), abê (a gourd shaker enveloped in a net of beads), and mineiro (a metal cylindrical shaker filled with metal shot or small dried seeds). The song form is call and response between a solo singer and (usually) a female chorus.

Today there are around 20 nações operating in the cities of Recife and Olinda. Although several have an unbroken line of activity going back to the 19th century, most have been set up in recent decades. Well-known nações include Estrela Brilhante, Leão Coroado, and Porto Rico. Each year they perform during the Carnival period in Recife and Olinda. Maracatu Nação Pernambuco, while not a traditional maracatu, was primarily responsible for introducing the genre to overseas audiences in the 1990s.

The genre has inspired the establishment of performing groups in a number of cities outside Brazil, including Lisbon, Toronto, Quebec City, New York City, Austin, Washington, D.C., Cologne, Berlin, Hamburg, Vienna, Lyon, Stockholm, London, Edinburgh, Brighton, Madison, Oakland, San Diego, Seattle, Portland, Manchester, Bristol, Oxford, Melbourne, Brisbane, and Madrid.

== Maracatu Rural ==
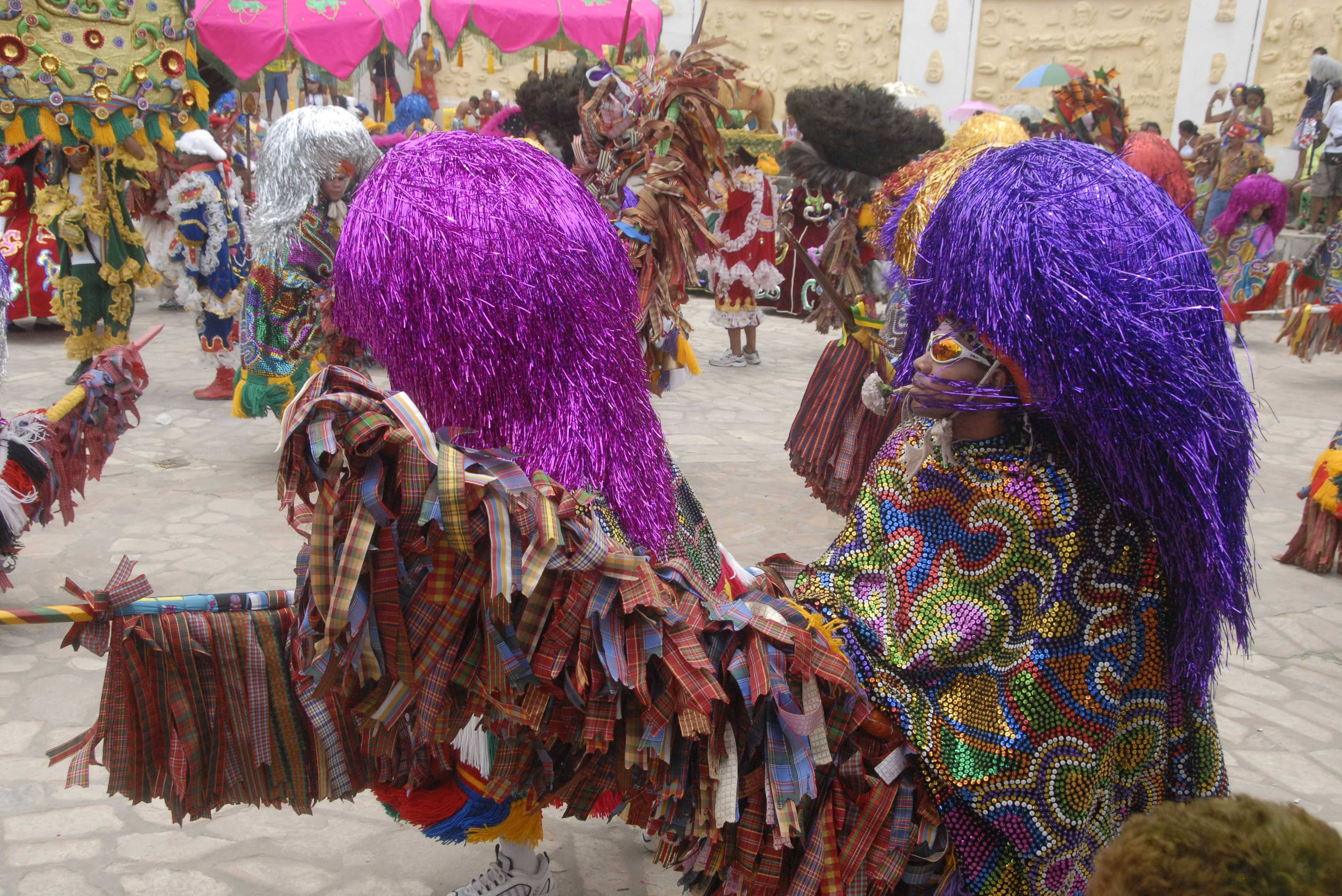
Maracatu rural performers

Maracatu Rural, rooted in the Pernambucan interior, is also known as maracatu de baque solto, maracatu de orquesta, and maracatu de trombone. Although it shares its name with the maracatu nação found in that state's cities, it is substantially different in terms of narrative, practice, and instrumentation. It evolved in the early 20th century as a fusion of pre-existing forms of Carnival revelry. It is considered to be Afro-indigenous in origin. Its members, typically sugarcane workers, are involved in the native-influenced Catimbó religion. Maracatu rural has a high participation rate with dozens of groups in operation.

== Maracatu cearense ==
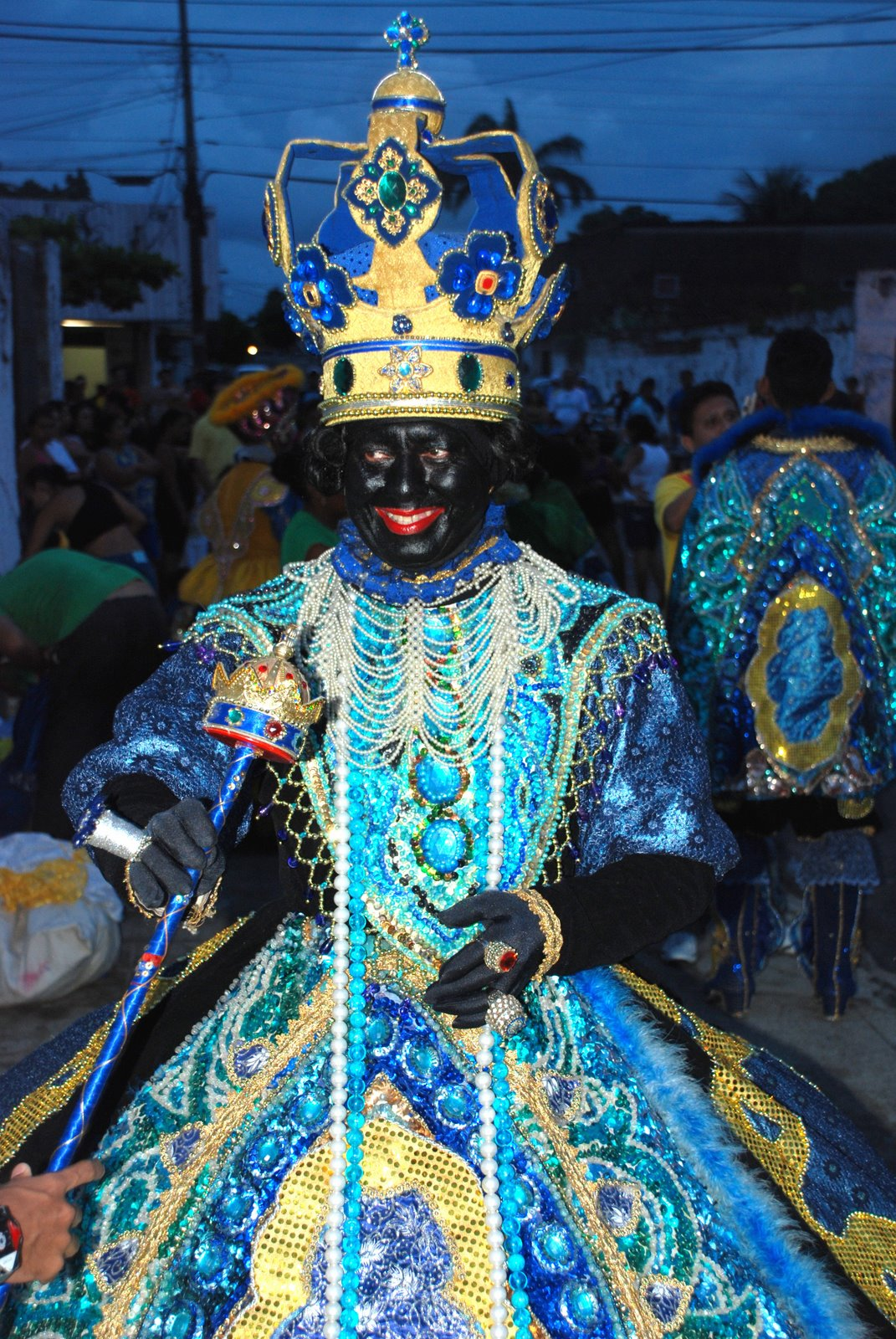
Cross-gendered maracatu cearense blackface queen. Pre-Carnival show in Caucaia, Ceará, February 2009.

Maracatu cearense is Fortaleza's variant of maracatu nação. Brought to Fortaleza, Ceará, in 1936, maracatu cearense has since been cultivated as the city's most distinctive Carnival performance tradition, owing in part to its use of blackface makeup to enact Afro-Brazilian characters and male-to-female transvestitism of the important female personages, particularly the queen. Its rhythms are described locally as cadenciado, "cadenced," which amounts to a less syncopated, steadier 2/4 meter and a slower tempo than is found in the maracatu nação of Pernambuco, sometimes as slow as 45 beats per minute. In recent decades groups have tended to divide into those that retain the slow tempo (to express the misery of slavery) and those that speed up their tempos (to express the exuberance of Carnival), and there is some dispute over which style most authentically expresses the tradition in Ceará. Standard instrumentation is also distinctive. Instead of alfaia drums, the cearense tradition uses surdo or bombo drums; like Pernambuco, it uses the Tarol, or snare drum. Instead of the gonguê, large single-head bell, maracatu cearense uses the ferro, a heavy iron-slab triangle, to keep its steady duple rhythm. Individual groups often add to or slightly modify this setup to create their own distinct sound.

Every year, different maracatu cearense nations parade in Fortaleza's traditional municipal Carnival competition, normally taking place at Domingos Olímpio Avenue. The oldest nation, Az de Ouro (Golden Ace), founded in 1936, is still in operation. Other nations include Vozes d'África (Voices of Africa), Nação Fortaleza, Rei de Paus, Nação Iracema, and Maracatu Solar.

The use of blackface in maracatu cearense reportedly stems from Fortaleza's mostly white and caboclo demographic, and its small black population (4.4%) (IGBE 2008), which effects a situation where mostly white and brown people end up performing a traditionally black expression of Brazilian Carnival. Blackface in this context is intended to pay homage to the African slaves' contribution to Brazilian civilization and is not viewed as a racist expression (compared, for instance, to the blackface minstrelsy of the United States, which parodied black speech and character). In fact, some maracatu cearense nations are actively involved in racial equality and black consciousness initiatives in Ceará. Among these is Nação Iracema, founded in 2002 by Lúcia Simão and William Augusto Pereira, heads of the first black family in Fortaleza to direct a maracatu nation (current as of 2009). Lúcia Simão also founded Ceará's first black consciousness movement in the early 1980s. This consciousness of racial equality operates through maracatu cearense performance in part as the continuation of Ceará's historical identity as the first region in Brazil to abolish slavery, in May 1884 (the rest of the nation followed suit in 1888).

Contrary to the claims of most maracatu cearense participants, at least one Brazilian scholar sees the development of the tradition in Fortaleza to be intimately tied to a subtle racist discourse in Ceará that has mythologized itself as a non-black region of Brazil (thus, the justification for blackface), perpetuating Brazil's longstanding racist ideology of skin whitening.
