= Fôrça Bruta =

Força Bruta

Studio album by Jorge Ben
- Released: September 1970
- Recorded: 1970
- Studios: C.B.D. (Rio de Janeiro); Scatena (São Paulo)
- Genres: Samba soul; Tropicália
- Length: 40:37
- Language: Portuguese
- Label: Philips
- Producer: Manoel Barenbein

Jorge Ben chronology
Jorge Ben (1969)	Força Bruta (1970)	Negro É Lindo (1971)

Fôrça Bruta (Brazilian Portuguese: [ˈfoʁsɐ ˈbɾutɐ]) is the seventh studio album by Brazilian singer-songwriter and guitarist Jorge Ben. It was recorded with the Trio Mocotó band and released by Philips Records in September 1970. Conceived at a time of political tension in dictatorial Brazil, its title comes from the Portuguese term meaning "brute force" and has been interpreted ironically due to the music's relatively relaxed style.

The album introduced an acoustic samba-based music that is mellower, moodier, and less ornate than Ben's preceding work. Its largely unrehearsed, nighttime recording session found the singer improvising with Trio Mocotó's groove-oriented accompaniment while experimenting with unconventional rhythmic arrangements, musical techniques, and elements of soul, funk, and rock. Ben's lyrics generally explore themes of romantic passion, melancholy, and sensuality, with women figuring prominently in his songs. In a departure from the carefree sensibility of his past releases, they also feature elements of identity politics and postmodernism, such as irony and reimagining of established idioms.

A commercial and critical success, Fôrça Bruta established Ben as a leading artist in Brazil's Tropicália movement and pioneered a unique sound later known as samba rock. Renowned among collectors and musicians but relatively rare outside of its country of origin, the album was released for the first time in the United States in 2007 by the specialty label Dusty Groove America, attracting further critical recognition. That same year, Rolling Stone Brasil named it among its 100 greatest Brazilian albums.

== Background ==
In 1969, Jorge Ben re-signed to Philips Records after a four-year leave from the label due to creative differences and recorded his self-titled sixth album. It featured songs performed with Trio Mocotó as his backing band; Ben had met the vocal/percussion group while touring the nightclub circuit in São Paulo in the late 1960s. The band's members were Fritz Escovão (who played the cuíca), Nereu Gargalo (tambourine), and João Parahyba (drums and percussion). The album was a commercial comeback for Ben, and its success created a busy schedule for all four musicians. This "hectic" period for them led music critic John Bush to believe it may have resulted in a relaxed recording of samba soul for Fôrça Bruta.

== Recording and production ==
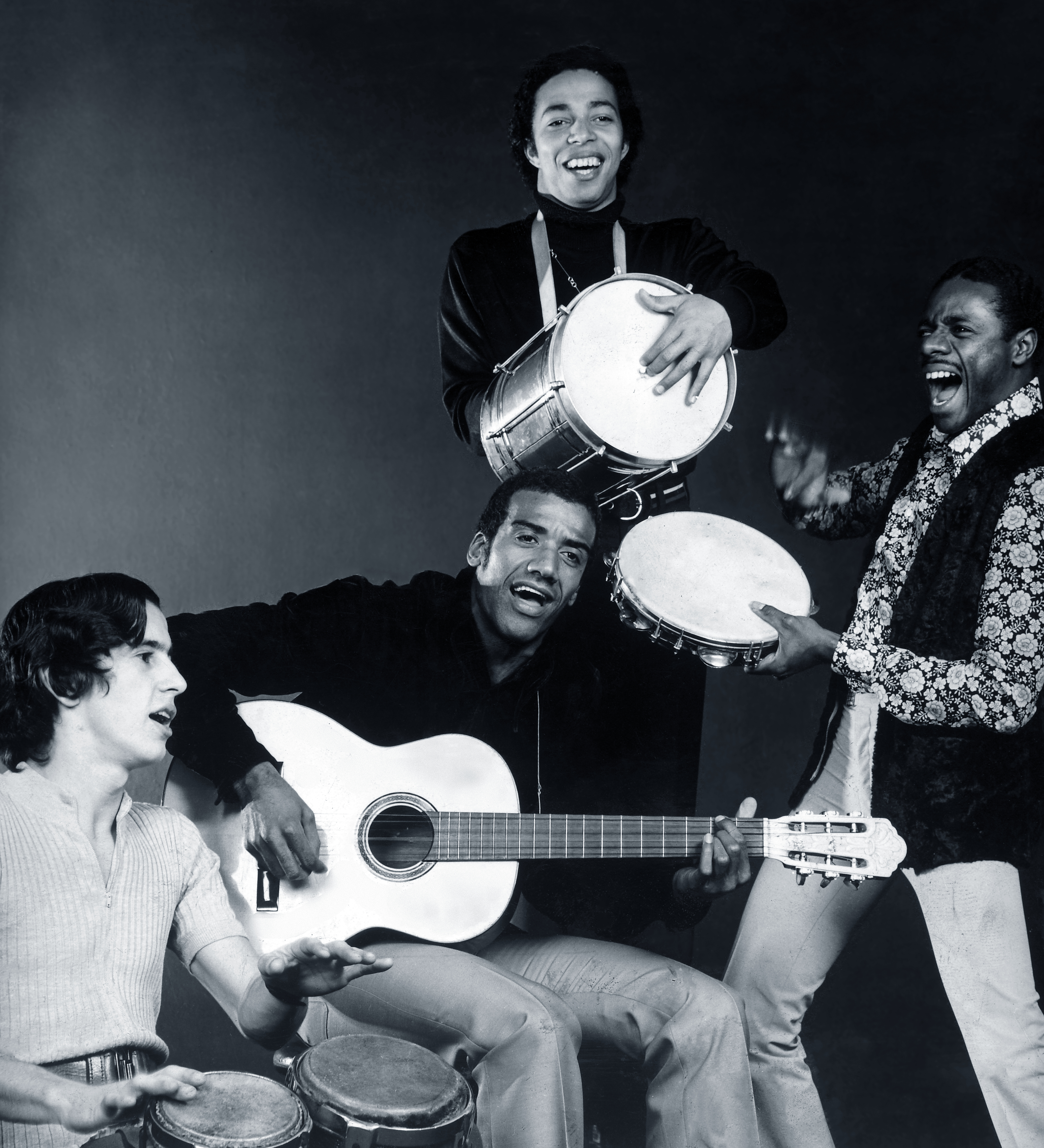
Ben (center) and Trio Mocotó in 1971; photo originally from Correio da Manhã and later collected by the Brazilian National Archives

Ben regrouped with Trio Mocotó in 1970 to record the album. They held one nighttime session without rehearsing most of the songs beforehand. According to Parahyba, this was intended to give listeners an impression of the mood that developed as they played in the studio.

During the session, Ben first sang his vocal for a song before the accompanying instrumentation was recorded. He played the acoustic guitar for the instrumentals, and specifically the ten-string viola caipira for the songs "Aparece Aparecida" and "Mulher Brasileira". He also repurposed a tuning fork, a device traditionally used by musicians to maintain musical tuning among instruments; the singer instead stimulated it with his mouth to generate sounds that resembled a harmonica.

For their part, Trio Mocotó attempted to develop a distinctive groove with a rhythm that would suit the rock or "iê-iê-iê" feel of Ben's guitar playing. The band played several percussion instruments, including the atabaque and bell plates. For "Charles Jr." and other tracks, Parahyba used the whistle of his sister's electric toy train as a horn instrument, breaking it in the process.

String and horn sections were recorded and included in the final mix but went uncredited in the album's packaging. It credited C.B.D. in Rio de Janeiro and Scatena in São Paulo as the recording locations for Fôrça Bruta, which was named after the Portuguese for the phrase "brute force". According to Robert Leaver of Amoeba Music's international records department, "one can see a sly irony" in the title, considering the heightened political tension in dictatorial Brazil at the time and the gentle quality of Ben's music for the album.

== Music ==
"Oba, Lá Vem Ela"
A sample of the opening song, featuring acoustic and melancholic qualities that characterize the rest of the album

Fôrça Bruta has a pervasive sense of melancholy and idiosyncratic contrast, according to Brazilian music scholar Pedro Alexandre Sanches, who identifies each composition on the album as either a samba, samba lament, or "samba-banzo". Greg Caz, a disc jockey specializing in Brazilian music, recognizes this quality as not only melancholic but mysterious and departing from the carefree sensibility that had been the singer's trademark. This is demonstrated in the lyrics, melodies, arrangements, and Ben's "devilish" guitar figures, with "Oba, Lá Vem Ela" and "Domênica Domingava" cited by Sanches as examples. Ben's guitar playing, more developed and prominently featured on this album, leads music journalist Jacob McKean to find the sound altogether subtler and "stripped down" when compared to his previous records, while colored by a "somewhat crunchy, folksy tone" established in the opening songs "Oba, Lá Vem Ela" and "Zé Canjica".

A single acoustic guitar plucks out sturdy notes against a backdrop of African drums as lush strings seep into the mix. It's all anchored by a voice as smooth and expressive as anything Sam Cooke ever put to vinyl.

— The Boston Globe (2007)

Overall, the songs are longer and more groove-based than on Ben's previous self-titled album. They also experiment with unconventional percussive arrangements, particularly on the cuíca-driven "O Telefone Tocou Novamente" and "Zé Canjica" (with its drum cadence), resulting in rhythmic contrasts between Trio Mocotó and Ben's instruments. This rhythmic direction departs from his earlier music's innovative "chacatum, chacatum" beat, which had become popular and widely imitated by the time of the album.

While still samba-based with hints of bossa nova, Fôrça Bruta also adds understated funk and soul elements in the form of horn and string arrangements. Horn riffs are arranged in the style of Sérgio Mendes on "Pulo, Pulo", in the style of Stax Records on "O Telefone Tocou Novamente", and on the title track, which appropriates the groove of the 1968 Archie Bell & the Drells song "Tighten Up". On "Mulher Brasileira", a string section is heard playing swirling patterns around Escovão's cuíca, while the more uptempo rhythms of "Charles Jr." and "Pulo, Pulo" are given contrast by more relaxed string melodies.

=== Vocals ===
Another source of contrast and funk/soul influence is Ben's singing, which McKean describes as "more intimate" than in the past. Along with his characteristic wails and croons, he exhibits a newfound raspy texture in his typically languid and nasal vocal. His singing also functions as an additional element of rhythm to some songs. According to Peter Margasak, Ben can be heard "reinforcing the rhythmic agility of his songs with pin-point phrasing, surprising intervallic leaps, and a plaintive kind of moan".

On "Zé Canjica" and "Charles Jr.", Ben improvises phrases (such as "Comanchero" and "the mama mama, the mama say") as rhythmic accompaniment during otherwise instrumental sections of the songs. The name "Comanche" is also implored by Ben in moments on the album. As Parahyba explains, it is a nickname given to him by Ben, who originally recorded it as a joke on "Charles Jr." A different explanation came in the form of a lyric in Ben's 1971 song "Comanche": "My mother calls me / Comanche".

=== Lyrics ===
Women are central figures in Ben's lyrics throughout the album, especially in "Mulher Brasileira", "Terezinha", and "Domênica Domingava"; "Domênica" is a variation on Domingas, the surname of his wife and muse Maria. His preoccupation with female characters led Sanches to identify Fôrça Bruta's predominant theme as Ben's "Dionysian body", referring to the philosophical concept of a body that can submit to passionate chaos and suffering before overcoming itself.

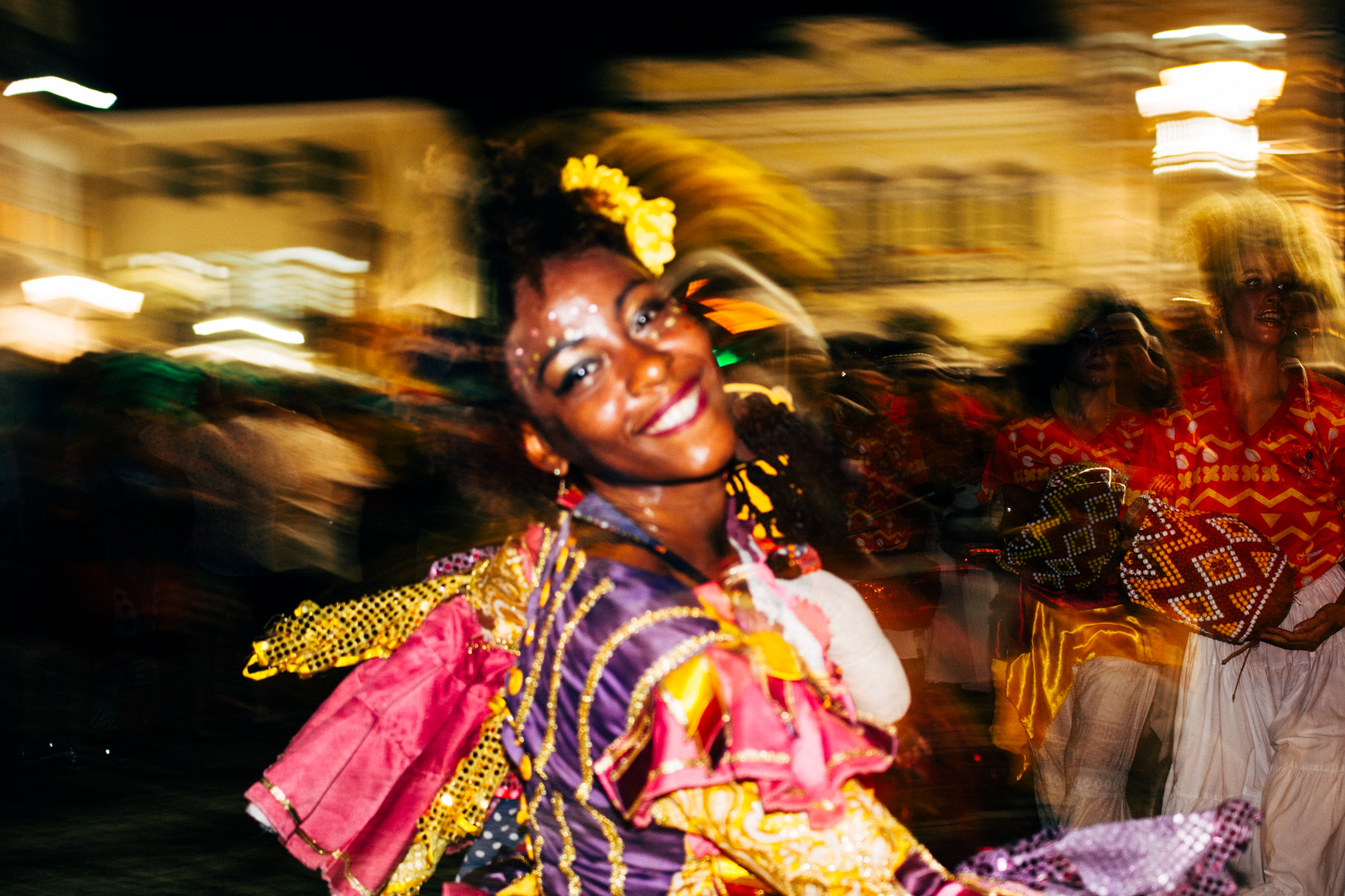
Women dancing at Carnaval de Salvador, an Afro-Brazilian cultural event. "Mulher Brasileira" celebrates Brazilian women of all backgrounds.

Several of the songs deal with romantic disappointment. In "Zé Canjica", the narrator apologizes for being confused, sad, and moody while sending away a lover he feels he does not deserve. "O Telefone Tocou Novamente" expresses grief and pity over an angry lover ringing the phone of the narrator, who leaves to meet, only not to find her. During the song, Sanches observes a moment of catharsis by Ben, who raises his singing voice to an almost crying falsetto.

Ben's lyrics also appropriate thematic devices from the popular imagination. Sanches compares the verses of the caipira-influenced samba "Apareceu Aparecida" and "Pulo, Pulo" to songs from ciranda, a traditional Brazilian children's dance. In "Apareceu Aparecida" – which employs the "rolling stone" idiom – the narrator rediscovers the euphoric joy of living after his beloved has accepted him again; this leads Sanches to conclude that Ben sings of hedonism in a concentrated state.

Some songs feature expressions of political values. The nationalistic "Mulher Brasileira" celebrates Brazilian women regardless of their physical appearance and is cited by Brazilian journalist Gabriel Proiete de Souza as an early example of Ben's attempt to empower Afro-Brazilian women through his music. In Caz's opinion, the lyrics on Fôrça Bruta reveal deeper concerns than were found in the singer's previous recordings, shown most notably by "Charles Jr.", in which Ben explores his identity as an artist and as a black man. Brazilian music academic Rafael Lemos believes it demonstrates Ben's process of placing "black heritage into modernity", in the aftermath of slavery in Brazil and the continued marginalization of black people there. According to one translation of the lyrics, the narrator proclaims:

My name is Charles Jr.
And I'm an angel too
But I don't want to be the first
Nor be better than anybody
I just want to live in peace
And be treated as an equal among equals
For in exchange of my love and affection
I want to be understood and taken into consideration
And, if possible, loved as well
'Cause it doesn't matter what I have
I'm no longer what my brothers once were, no, no
I was born of a free womb
Born of a free womb in the 20th century
I have love and faith
To go into the 21st century
Where the conquests of science, space and medicine
And the brotherhood of all human beings
And the humbleness of a king
Will be the weapons of victory
For universal peace
And the whole world will hear
And the whole world will know
That my name is Charles Jr.
And I'm an angel too.

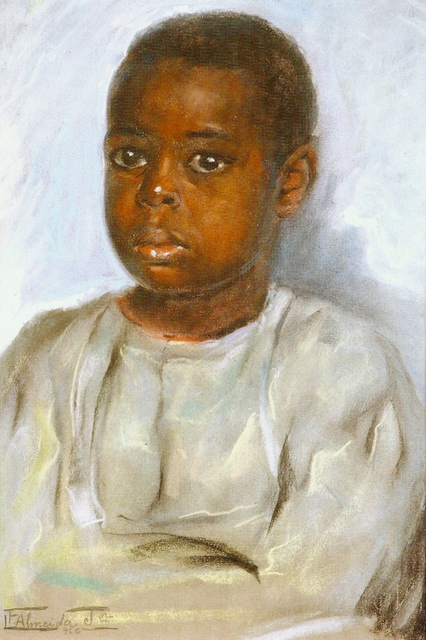
O Negrinho (English: The Black Boy) by Almeida Júnior. "Charles Jr." explores black heritage in post-slavery Brazil.

"Charles Jr." and other songs also use elements of postmodernism, such as self-reference, irony, and surrealism (as in the lyrics of "Pulo, Pulo"). Some of Fôrça Bruta's characters and stories had appeared on Ben's earlier work, albeit in slightly different manifestations. On his 1969 album, "Charles" was depicted as a heroic Robin Hood-like figure of the country. The sensually primitive "Domingas" and "Teresa", also from the previous record, are rendered here as the more sophisticated "Domênica" and the irreverent "Terezinha", respectively. Ben sings the latter song in an exceptionally nasal voice interpreted by Sanches as an ironic caricature of música popular brasileira.

== Reception and impact ==
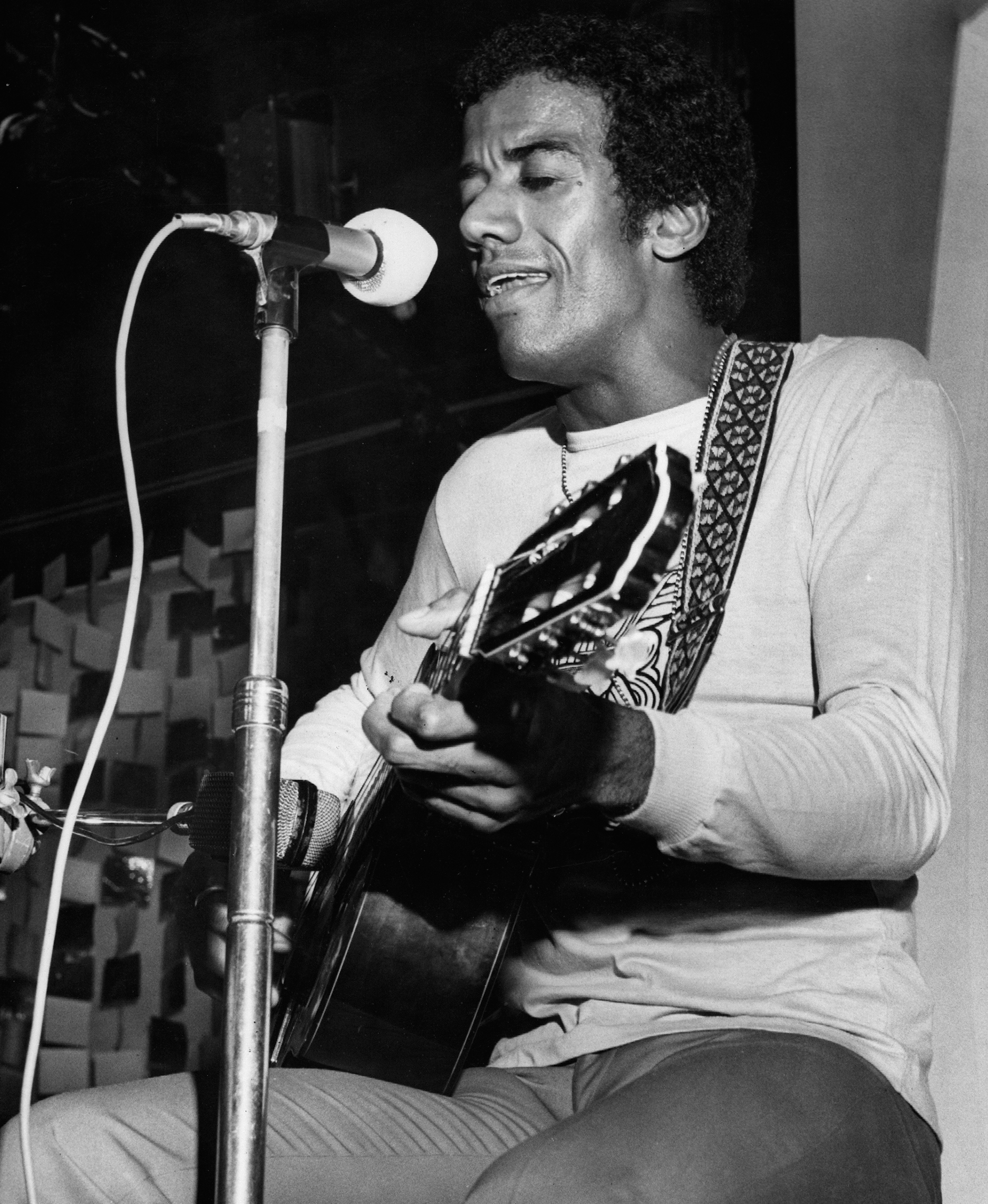
Ben in 1972; Fôrça Bruta's success helped the musician reinvent himself and shape his subsequent work.

Fôrça Bruta was released by Philips in September 1970. It was received favorably in Veja magazine, whose reviewer found it impressively rhythmic, full of musical surprises and suspense, and comparable to a comic book in the way familiar fantasies and characters are reformulated in strange yet delightful directions. Commercially, it was a top-10 chart success in Brazil and produced the hit singles "O Telefone Tocou Novamente" and "Mulher Brasileira".

The album's performance established Ben as an integral artist in Brazil's Tropicália movement, led by fellow musicians Caetano Veloso and Gilberto Gil. The following year on his next album, Negro É Lindo (English: Black Is Beautiful), Ben delved further into the black identity politics of "Charles Jr." while retaining the melancholic musical quality of the previous record.

Fôrça Bruta's fusion of Trio Mocotó's groove and Ben's more rockish guitar proved to be a distinctive feature of what critics and musicians later called samba rock. Its soul and funk elements, most prominent in the title track, helped earn the album a respected reputation among soul enthusiasts and rare-record collectors. In an interview for Guy Oseary's On the Record (2004), music entrepreneur and record collector Craig Kallman named Fôrça Bruta among his 15 favorite albums. Recording artist Beck also named it one of his favorite albums.

=== Reissue and reappraisal ===
In 2007, Fôrça Bruta was re-released by Dusty Groove America, a specialty label in Chicago that reissued rare funk, jazz, soul, and Brazilian music titles in partnership with Universal Music. The reissue marked the first time the album had seen release in the United States. Dusty Groove asked Chicago Reader critic Peter Margasak to write liner notes for the release, but he declined, citing in part the lack of American literature available on Ben. New York-based retailer Other Music later named it the fourth best reissue of 2007 and one of Ben's "deepest, most emotional albums". That same year, Fôrça Bruta was ranked 61st on Rolling Stone Brasil's list of the 100 greatest Brazilian albums. In an essay accompanying the ranking, journalist Marcus Preto called it the singer's most melancholy album.

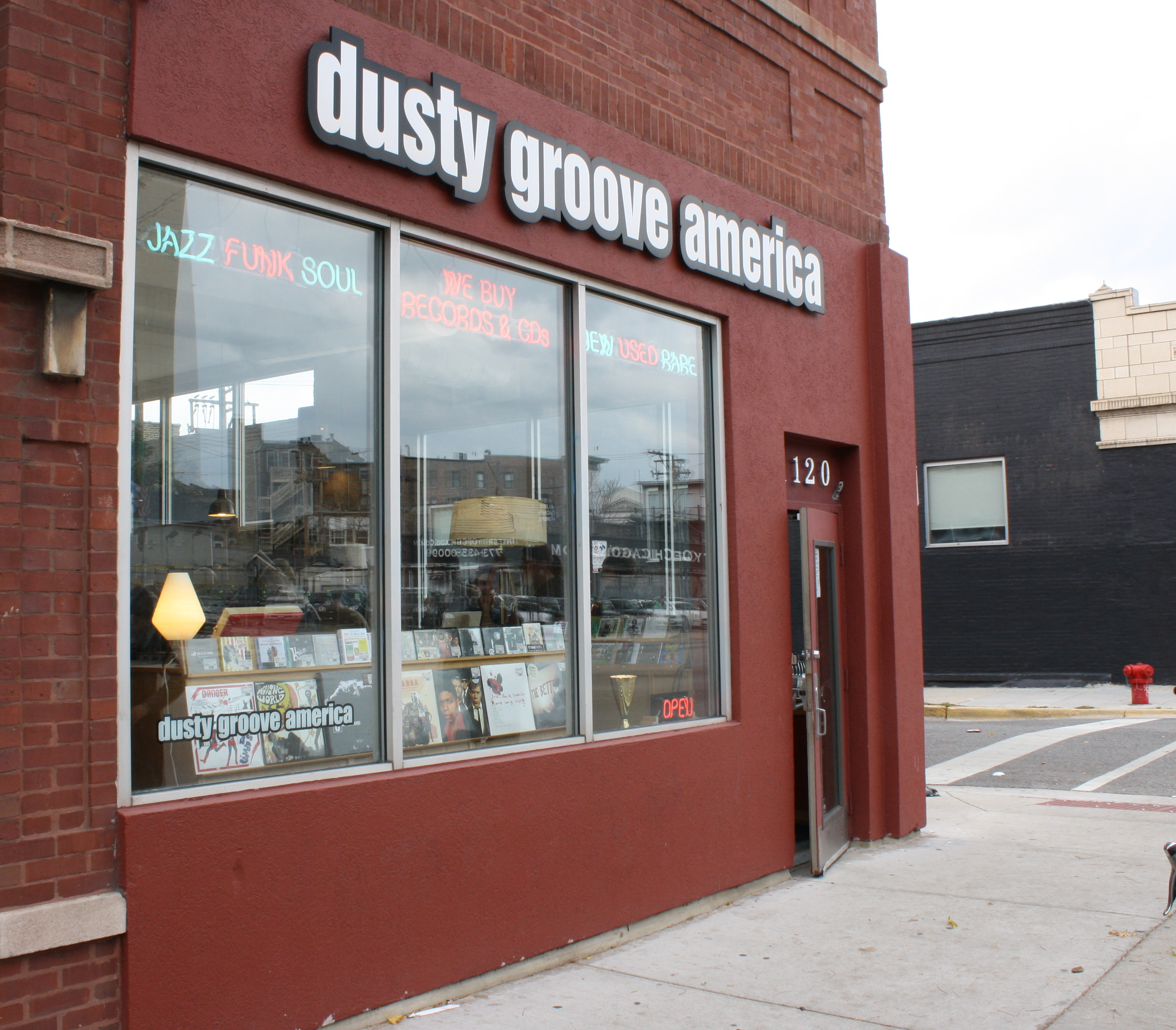
Chicago headquarters and storefront of Dusty Groove America, Fôrça Bruta's first US distributor

In a retrospective review for AllMusic, John Bush regards Fôrça Bruta as one of Ben's best records and gives it four-and-a-half out of a possible five stars. In his estimation, it retained each participating musician's abilities over the course of "a wonderful acoustic groove that may have varied little but was all the better for its agreeable evenness". A reviewer for The Boston Globe says Ben's masterful performance of this music – "a fusion of bright samba and mellow soul" – still sounds original and essential more than 30 years after its recording. Recommended even for non-Lusophones, it "transcends language and era with an organic vibe and breezy spontaneity", in his opinion.

Other reviews praise Fôrça Bruta as a "samba-soul heater" (Now's Tim Perlich) and "one of the most buoyantly textured and warmly melodic LPs ever recorded" (Matthew Hickey from Turntable Kitchen), with Hickey calling "Oba, Lá Vem Ela" among its "loveliest tunes". In Impose magazine, Jacob McKean highlights the two opening tracks, finding "Zé Canjica" particularly attractive, and believes that "Apareceu Aparecida" features the album's most appealing hook. He also finds Trio Mocotó incomparable in their performance and the album to be elegant and exquisite overall. However, he quips of Ben's nasally singing on "Terezinha", saying it sounds unusual, and that the string section is given slightly too much emphasis on "Mulher Brasileira".

Less enthusiastic about the album is Stylus Magazine's Mike Powell, who writes that it has "a kind of aesthetic gentility" that characterizes most Brazilian music and polarizes its listeners as a consequence. Powell adds that, while his cavil may be silly, Fôrça Bruta remains "demure samba-rock laced with sliding strings, an agreeable, samey atmosphere, no strife on the horizon", assigning it a letter grade of "B-minus". According to Peter Shapiro, it may be "too dainty" or not adventurous enough for some listeners, lacking the stylistically eclectic abandon of other Tropicália music. But in his appraisal in The Wire, he judges the album to be "something of a minor masterpiece of textural contrast" and "a stone cold classic of Brazilian modernism", representative of the country's flair for "weaving beguiling syncretic music from practically any cloth".

Having discovered Ben's music in 2009, indie rock musician Andrew Bird writes in a guest column for Time that Fôrça Bruta is a classic of "raw and soulful Tropicália". He also observes in Ben's singing a "pleading quality" that projects a simultaneous sense of melancholy and delight. Alynda Segarra of Hurray for the Riff Raff listened to it while making her band's 2017 album The Navigator, later citing Fôrça Bruta's string arrangements as an influence on her "cinematic" approach to the album's lyrics.

== Track listing ==
All songs were composed by Jorge Ben.

Side one
No.	Title	Length
1.	"Oba, Lá Vem Ela"	4:13
2.	"Zé Canjica"	3:53
3.	"Domênica Domingava num Domingo Linda toda de Branco"	3:50
4.	"Charles Jr."	6:09
5.	"Pulo, Pulo"	2:50

Side two
No.	Title	Length
1.	"Apareceu Aparecida"	3:17
2.	"O Telefone Tocou Novamente"	3:51
3.	"Mulher Brasileira"	4:27
4.	"Terezinha"	3:13
5.	"Fôrça Bruta"	5:15

== Personnel ==
Credits are adapted from the album's liner notes.

- Jorge Ben – guitar, vocals

Trio Mocotó

- Fritz Escovão – cuíca
- Nereu Gargalo – percussion
- Jõao Parahyba – drums

Production

- Ari Carvalhaes – engineering
- Manoel Barenbein – production
- João Kibelkstis – engineering
- João Moreira – engineering

== Charts ==
Chart (1971)	Peak position
Brazil LP's (Amiga)	7
Brazil LP's – Rio de Janeiro (Billboard)	9

== See also ==
- 1970s in Latin music
- Cinematic soul
- Jovem Guarda
- Music of Brazil
- Postmodern music

== Bibliography ==
- Anon. (30 September 1970). "O super-ritmo". Veja (in Portuguese).
- Anon.[a] (19 January 1971). "LPs". Amiga (in Portuguese). No. 35.
- Anon.[b] (30 January 1971). "Hits of the World". Billboard.
- Anon. (30 January 1997). "Ingleses detonam o Ano Rock com Krishna e Ácido". Manchete (in Portuguese).
- Anon. (23 November 2007). "Sound Advice on Reissues". The Boston Globe. Archived from the original on 5 November 2018.
- Anon. (2008). Fôrça Bruta (LP liner notes). Jorge Ben. 4 Men With Beards. 4M168.
- Bird, Andrew (20 April 2009). "Andrew Bird's Short List". Time.
- Bush, John (n.d.). "Força Bruta – Jorge Ben". AllMusic. Archived from the original on 17 December 2018.
- Caz, Greg (15 December 2011). "Brute Force: A Look at Jorge Ben's Recorded Work". Revive. Okayplayer. Archived from the original on 24 September 2018.
- Powell, Mike (19 September 2007). "Jorge Ben - Força Bruta - Review". Stylus Magazine. Archived from the original on 30 October 2007.
- Proiete de Souza, Gabriel (30 June 2017). "Jorge Ben Jor e a independência da mulher negra". Medium. Archived from the original on 27 November 2018.
- Gooding-Williams, Robert (2001). Zarathustra's Dionysian Modernism. Stanford University Press. ISBN 978-0-8047-3295-6.
- Guima, Vítor (23 February 2017). "Discos Escondidos #039: Jorge Ben – Força Bruta (1970)". Jardim Elétrico (in Portuguese). Archived from the original on 24 February 2017.
- Hickey, Matthew (16 October 2013). "Single Serving: Junip – Oba, Lá Vem Ela (Jorge Ben Cover)". Turntable Kitchen. Archived from the original on 24 September 2018.
- Hull, Tom (3 May 2021). "Music Week". Tom Hull – on the Web.
- Leaver, Robert (n.d.). "Jorge Ben – Biography". Amoeba Music. Archived from the original on 27 November 2018.
- Lemos, Rafael (May 2018). "Jorge Ben Jor and the 60's: A Black Man in the Modern Patropi" (PDF). Bossa Magazine.
- Madell, Josh (12 December 2007). "The Other Music Update". Other Music. Archived from the original on 26 April 2019.
- Margasak, Peter (12 July 2007). "Dusty Groove Gets Groovier". Chicago Reader. Archived from the original on 18 December 2018.
- McKean, Jacob (2008). "Jorge Ben Jorge Ben (1969) + Força Bruta". Impose. Archived from the original on 24 September 2018.
- Oseary, Guy (2004). On the Record: Over 150 of the Most Talented People in Music Share the Secrets of Their Success. Penguin Books. ISBN 978-0-14-200304-6.
- Parahyba, Jõao (21 September 2005). "Uma Noite Ben Jor". Trip (in Portuguese). Archived from the original on 23 September 2018.
- Perlich, Tim (9 August 2007). "Perlich's Picks". Now. Archived from the original on 25 September 2018.
- Preto, Marcus (October 2007). "Listas – Os 100 Maiores Discos da Música Brasileira – Força Bruta – Jorge Ben (1970, Philips)". Rolling Stone Brasil (in Portuguese). Archived from the original on 27 February 2014.
- Sanches, Pedro Alexandre (2000). Tropicalismo: Decadência Bonita do Samba (in Portuguese). Boitempo Editorial. ISBN 978-85-85934-54-5.
- Shapiro, Peter (November 2007). "Jorge Ben: Força Bruta Dusty Groove CD". Soundcheck: The Boomerang. The Wire. No. 285 – via Exact Editions.(subscription required)
- Willems, Jasper (2 March 2017). "Radical Roots: DiS meets Hurray For The Riff Raff". Drowned in Sound. Archived from the original on 21 December 2018.
