= Trio Mocotó =

Brazilian samba rock band

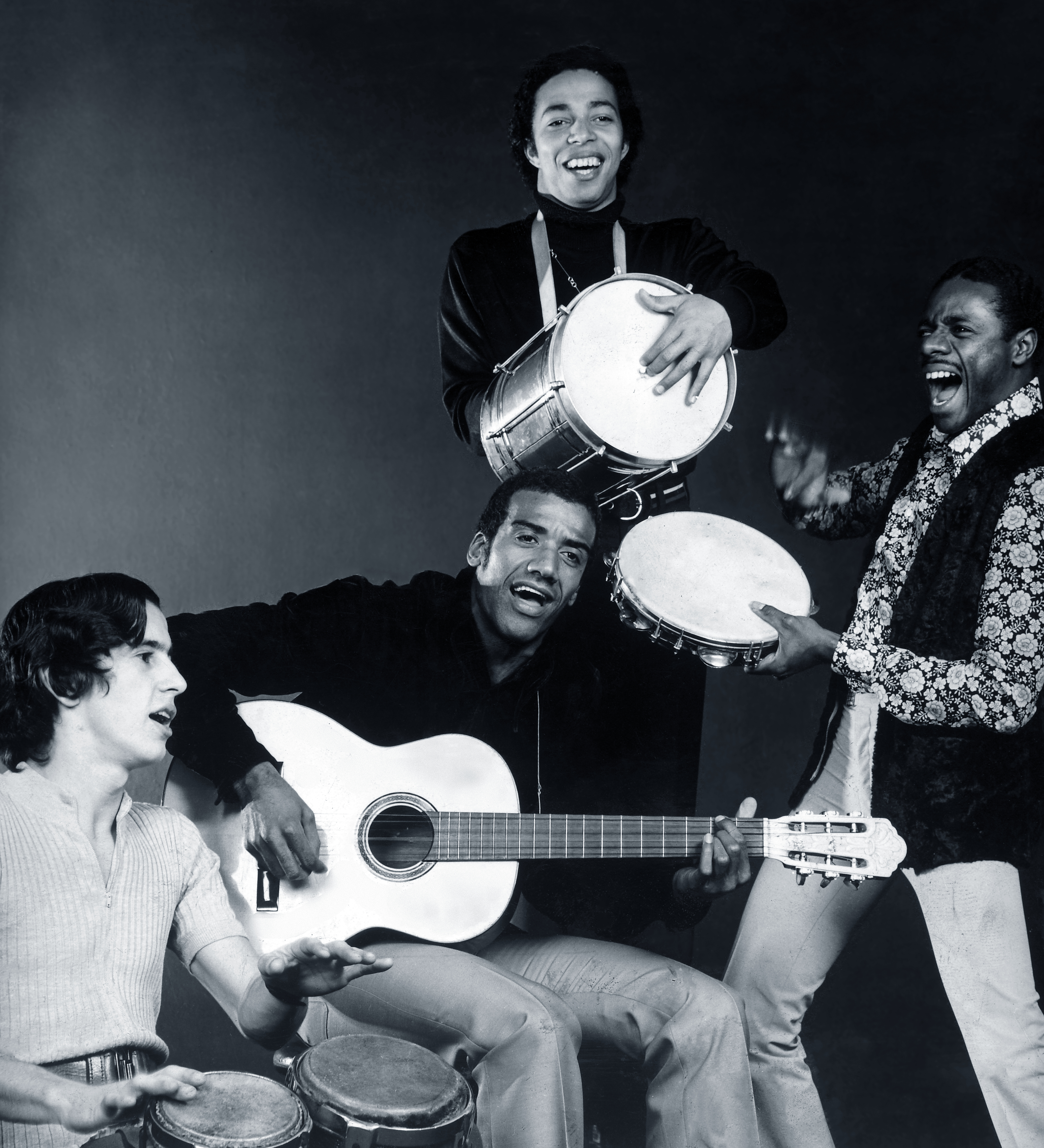
- Trio Mocotó with Ben (center)

Background information
- Origin: São Paulo, Brazil
- Genres: Sambalanço; samba rock; MPB

Trio Mocotó is a Brazilian band, originally formed in 1968 in the Jogral nightclub in São Paulo, and reformed in 2000. The group was influential in forming the musical style that became known as samba rock or sambalanço. In 1969, they were backing Jorge Ben, being featured on seminal albums Fôrça Bruta, Negro É Lindo and A Tábua de Esmeralda.

In 1971, they had a hit with the single "Coqueiro Verde" (written by Erasmo Carlos). Their return to the studios with Samba Rock in 2001 was followed by tours and live appearance in main music festivals in Europe and Japan, with renewed energy and public. The group received in 2001 the APCA (São Paulo Art Critics Association) award for Best Group, and in 2006 Nereu's album as solo artist "Samba Power" received again the APCA, this time with Best Album of the Year.

In 2011, they collaborated with Mayra Andrade on the song "Berimbau" for the Red Hot Organization's most recent charitable album Red Hot + Rio 2. The album is a follow-up to the 1996 Red Hot + Rio. Proceeds from the sales will be donated to raise awareness and money to fight AIDS/HIV and related health and social issues.

Skowa died following a cardiac arrest on 13 June 2024, at the age of 68. Original founding member, vocalist and guitarist Fritz Escovão, died on 1 October 2024, at the age of 81.

== Members ==
- João Parahyba, vocalist and drummer (who worked with Suba and played on Bebel Gilberto's Tanto Tempo)
- Nereu Gargalo, vocalist and percussionist

=== Ex-members ===
- Luiz Carlos Fritz (a.k.a. "Fritz Escovão"), vocalist and guitarist
- Skowa, vocalist and guitarist

== Albums ==
- 1971: Muita Zorra! Ou São Coisas Que Glorificam a Sensibilidade Atual (Phonogram/Philips)
- 1973: Trio Mocotó (RGE/Fermata)
- 1977: The Brazilian Sound (CAM)
- 2001: Samba Rock (Six Degrees Records/ released in Europe and Japan by Ziriguiboom/Crammed Discs)
- 2004: Beleza! Beleza!! Beleza!!! (YB Music/ released in Europe and North America by Ziriguiboom/Crammed Discs)

== Labels ==
- Phonogram/Philips - Forma
- RGE/Fermata
- YB Music

== Sources ==
- Motta, Nelson (2001). Noites Tropicais: Solos, Improvisos e Memórias Musicais (in Portuguese). Rio de Janeiro: Objetiva. ISBN 978-85-7302-292-6. OCLC 750828627.
