= YB Music =

Brazilian independent record

- Founded: 1999
- Country of origin: Brazil
- Location: São Paulo
- Official website: http://www.yb.com.br/gravadora_catalogo.asp

YB Music is an independent record label established in São Paulo, Brazil. It started in 1999, releasing music from new underground artists as well as revival acts. Its catalog includes different styles of Brazilian music featuring hip hop, samba-rock revisited by (Trio Mocotó), electronic music (Anvil FX), instrumental music including classical music and jazz (Sujeito a Guincho, Quarteto Camargo Guarnieri, Nouvelle), (Curumin, Instituto), and mangue beat from Recife. The label was responsible for the first album by Nação Zumbi after the death of their frontman Chico Science. The label received in 2001, 2005 and 2012 the APCA (São Paulo Art Critics Association) prize with the releases of Samba Rock (Best Group - Trio Mocotó), Samba Power (Best Album) and Badi Assad (Best Composer) respectively.

According to scholar K.E. Goldschmitt, the label played a "nurturing role" in the rising popularity of popular and electronic music on the São Paulo scene in the early 2000s.

The record company also joins the "Retomada" of Brazilian cinema by releasing the soundtrack for the film O Invasor by Instituto, as well as scoring in its studios the soundtracks for O Redentor (2004), A Mulher do Meu Amigo (2008), A Mulher Invisível (2009), Garcia (2010), O Homem do Futuro (2011) among others.

== Discography ==
- Rica Amabis – Sambadelic (1999)
- Andrea Marquee – Zumbi (1999)
- Sujeito a Guincho – Die Klarinetmaschine (1999)
- Vários Artistas – Baião de Viramundo – Tributo a Luiz Gonzaga|Baião de Viramundo (2000)
- Nação Zumbi – Radio S.Amb.A (2000)
- Mamelo Sound System – Mamelo Sound System (2000)
- Nouvelle – Free Bossa (2000)
- Bojo – Carlos (2000)
- João Parahyba – Kyzumba (2000)
- Walter Franco – Tutano (2001)
- Trio Mocotó – Samba Rock (2001)
- Bolão – Back 2 Bahia (2001)
- KIDZ – KIDZ (2001)
- Quinta – Sala de Estar (2001)
- Duo Quanta – Duo Quanta (2001)
- Anvil FX – Miolo (2002)
- Mo'jama – Pulsação (2002)
- Tuca Fernandes & Quinteto Delas – Luar – Canções de Arrigo Barnabé (2002)
- Quarteto Camargo Guarnieri – Quarteto Camargo Guarnieri (2002)
- Instituto – Coleção Nacional (2002)
- KIDZ – Crianças (2002)
- [Vários] – Trilha Sonora: O Invasor (2002)
- Bonsucesso Sambaclube – Bonsucesso Sambaclube (2002)
- Curumin – Achados e Perdidos (2003)
- Comadre Fulozinha – Tocar na Banda (2003)
- Maria José Carrasqueira – Ernesto Nazareth (2003)
- Frank Jorge – Vida de Verdade
- Belô Velloso – Grandes Clássicos Vol. 1 (2003)
- Duo Clarones – Duo Clarones (2003)
- Flu – No Flu do Mundo (2003)
- KIDZ – Diversão (2003)
- Vários – Trilha Sonora do Filme: Amarelo Manga (2003)
- Mamelo Sound System – Urbália (2003)
- Trio Mocotó – Beleza Beleza Beleza (2004)
- Arthur de Faria – Música para bater pezinho (2004)
- Che – Sexy 70 (2004)
- KIDZ – Agora (2004)
- Vários – Trilha Sonora: O Redentor (2004)
- Os poEts – Música legal com letra bacana (2004)
- Instituto e DJ Dolores – Trilha: Narradores de Javé: Remix
- Maskavo – O som que vem da luz do sol (2004)
- Nereu Mocotó & Swing – Samba Power (2005)
- Nuandré – A KiD Like Me (2005)
- Mamelo Sound System – Operação Parcel ou Remixália (2005)
- Instituto – Coleta Seletiva (2005)
- Clara Moreno – Morena Bossa Nova (2005)
- Elisa Fukuda & Giuliano Montini – De Villa Lobos a Brahms (2006)
- KIDZ – Rebelião (2006)
- Nuandré – 2 (2006)
- Mariana Aydar – Brasil, Sons e Sabores (2006)
- Marcelo Quintanilha & Vânia Abreu – Pierrot & Colombina (2006)
- Mamelo Sound System – Velha Guarda 22 (2006)
- Z'África Brasil – Tem Cor Age ( 2006)
- Romulo Fróes – Cão (2006)
- Divina Caffé – Divina Caffé 2 (2006)
- Turbo Trio – Baile Bass (2007)
- Instituto – Ossário (2007)
- Paulo V – Feriado (2007)
- KIDZ – Histórias de Natal (2007)
- Estela Cassilatti – Peixes = Pássaros (2008)
- Curumin – JapanPopShow (2008)
- Bruno Morais – A vontade superstar (2009)
- Romulo Fróes – No chão sem o chão (2009)
- Clube do Balanço – Pela Contramão (2009)
- Paulo V – Sonho (2009)
- Lulina – Cristalina (2009)
- Lucas Santtana – Sem Nostalgia (2009)
- Geração SP – Geração SP (2010)
- Juliana R – Juliana R (2010)
- Roger W. Lima – 8 Musiquinhas & 1 Acalanto (2010)
- Tulipa Ruiz – Efêmera (2010)
- Nina Becker – Vermelho (2010)
- Nina Becker – Azul (2010)
- Che – Papagaio's Fever (2010)
- Leo Cavalcanti – Religar (2010)
- Blubell – Eu Sou Do Tempo Em Que A Gente Se Telefonava (2011)
- Bruno Batista – Eu Não Sei Sofrer Em Inglês (2011)
- Romulo Fróes – Um Labirinto Em Cada Pé (2011)
- Pélico – Que Isso Fique Entre Nós (2011)
- Eliane Tokeshi e Guida Borghoff – Guerra-Peixe: Obras Para Violino e Piano (2011)
- Dan Nakagawa – O Oposto de Dizer Adeus (2011)
- Pipo Pegoraro – Taxi-Imã (2011)
- Passo Torto – Passo Torto (2011)
- Juliana Perdigão – Album Desconhecido (2011)
- Dudu Tsuda – Le Son Par Lui Même (2011)
- Saulo Duarte – Saulo Duarte e a Unidade (2012)
- Nina Becker e Marcelo Callado – Gambito Budapeste (2012)
- Rodrigo Campos – Bahia Fantástica (2012)
- Badi Assad – Amor e Outras Manias Crônicas (2012)
- Flu – Rocks (2012)
- Paulo V – Paulo V (2012)
- Anvil FX – Anvil Machine (2013)
- Cacá Machado – Eslavosamba (2013)
- Gian Correa – Mistura 7 (2013)
- Aeromosca – Aeromosca (2013)
- Sinamantes – Sinamantes (2013)
- Passo Torto – Passo Elétrico (2013)
- Aláfia – Aláfia (2013)
- Wazzabi – Na Farofa (2013)
- Andrei Furlan – Dia de casa (2013)
- Felipe Cordeiro – Se apaixone pela loucura do seu amor (2013)
- Blubell – Diva é a Mãe (2013)
- Luciana Oliveira – Pura (2013)
- Gui Amabis – Trabalhos Carnívoros (2013)
- Lulina – Pantin (2013)

== Filmography ==
- Traição (Episódio Diabólica) – Conspiração Filmes (Brasil, 1998)
- Redentor – Conspiração Filmes (Brasil, 2004)
- El Pasado (Brasil, 2007) – additional music
- A Mulher do meu Amigo – Conspiração Filmes (Brasil, 2008)
- A Mulher Invisível – Conspiração Filmes (Brasil, 2009)
- O Amor Segundo B. Schianberg – Drama Filmes (Brasil, 2009)
- Garcia – (Colombia/Brasil, 2010)
- O Homem do Futuro – Conspiração Filmes (Brasil, 2011)
- Mato sem Cachorro – Globo Filmes (Brasil, 2013)
