= Skowa =

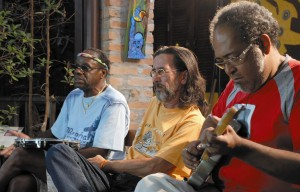
- Skowa (third, from left to right) playing with Trio Mocotó in 2012

Background information
- Born: Marco Antônio Gonçalves dos Santos; December 13, 1955; São Paulo, Brazil
- Died: June 13, 2024 (aged 68) Botucatu, Brazil
- Genres: Soul music, funk, samba rock, popular music
- Occupations: Singer-songwriter, guitarist
- Instruments: Vocals, classical guitar
- Years active: 1975–2024
- Formerly of: Sossega Leão, Premê, Skowa e a Máfia, Trio Mocotó
- Website: http://clubecaiubi.ning.com/profile/Skowa

Marco Antônio Gonçalves dos Santos (December 13, 1955 – June 13, 2024), better known as Skowa, was a Brazilian singer-songwriter and musician.

== Biography ==
Skowa was born in São Paulo, on December 13, 1955; his stage name is an allusion to the Portuguese-language word for "brush", "escova", referencing his iconic afro hairstyle. As a teenager he learned how to play the classical guitar, and began to play professionally in 1975, when he would join the rock bands Sossega Leão and Premê (at the time known as "Premeditando o Breque").

In the early 1980s he collaborated with Itamar Assumpção and the new wave band Gang 90 e as Absurdettes. In 1984 he hosted two radio programs for the USP FM, Caribe 38 and Rapazes da Banda, the latter one being a talk show.

In 1987 he founded the influential soul band Skowa e a Máfia, which released two albums before disbanding in 1991 and reuniting in 2006. Skowa also took part in the 1989 tribute album to Arnaldo Baptista Sanguinho Novo... Arnaldo Baptista Revisitado, in which he covered the song "É Fácil".

As of 2003 Skowa was part of the samba rock trio Trio Mocotó, replacing founding member Fritz Escovão. He died following a cardiac arrest on June 13, 2024, at the age of 68.
