= The Flower Investment Pawn =

Studio album by LKFFCT
- Released: 5 August 2016
- Genre: Indie rock, Alternative pop
- Length: 31:16
- Label: Sniffling Indie Kids
- Producer: Sklyar Adler

LKFFCT chronology
American Sarcasm (2015)	The Flower Investment Pawn (2016)	Dawn Chorus (2017)

The Flower Investment Pawn is the third studio album from the American rock band LKFFCT.

== Content ==
The eleven-track album was released on compact disc and digital download with Sniffling Indie Kids, on 5 August 2016. It was recorded, mixed and mastered by Sklyar Adler and Reed Adler. Album artwork is by Andrea Aidekman. The tracks were culled from five months of rehearsal, and recorded in one week. The Flower Investment Plan is described as psychedelic and power-pop, and draws comparison to the music of the pop rock band Weezer, the lo-fi band Guided by Voices, the grunge band Nirvana, and the experimental rock singer-songwriter Captain Beefheart. Lead vocals and songwriting are shared by Rauch and Williams. The songs "Appleseed" and "Cure-All" were released as singles.

== Reception ==
A review by Bob Makin in Courier News says "there isn't a bit of filler on this impressive outing," noting that the "band's bond translates into tight interplay and dynamic arrangements," on The Flower Investment Plan. He calls "Howlin' Alarm" his favorite song because of "its seesaw of sweet and sour stylings and introspective explosions." Speak Into My Good Eye describes the single "Cure-All" as a "racous [song] that meshes an alluring shout-along chorus with a mixture of pop-punk riffing and crunchy hardcore accents."

Impose elaborates the single "Appleseed" as a "plant parenthood power ballad," saying that "the Jersey boys take on the traditional folk lore tales of the mythic wandering arboriculturist that implies a further metaphoric double entendre about the character and his progenitive endeavors." The review closes with "LKFFCT puts the emotion and affirmation forward with garage power pop gold."

== Track listing ==
No.	Title	Length
1.	"Chipping Paint"	2:33
2.	"Appleseed"	3:02
3.	"Howlin' Alarm"	2:37
4.	"Tide"	2:01
5.	"Duffle Bags"	3:02
6.	"Sentiment"	2:36
7.	"Milk the Cow"	4:06
8.	"Poppy Seeds"	2:37
9.	"Cure-All"	3:39
10.	"Peaches"	2:40
11.	"Join the Team"	2:23
Total length:		31:16

== Personnel ==
- Ryan Baredes – drums and percussion
- Brian Legentil – bass
- Max Rauch – guitar, vocals and percussion
- Keith Williams – guitar and vocals
