= JapanPopShow =

Studio album by Curumin
- Released: 2008
- Recorded: 2007–2008
- Genre: Brazilian
- Label: YB Music
- Producer: Curumin, Gustavo Lenza, Lucas Martins

Curumin chronology
Achados e Perdidos (2005)	JapanPopShow (2008)	Arrocha (2012)

Professional ratings
Review scores
Source	Rating
Globo.com(BR)	very positive link
Metromix	link
PopMatters.com(US)	link
SPIN Magazine	link

JapanPopShow is the second album of Brazilian singer/drummer Curumin. It was co-produced by Curumin, Gustavo Lenza and Lucas Martins in 2008 and released originally by YB Music in Brazil. Quannum Projects released the album in the United States.

== Track listing ==
1. Salto no Vácuo com Joelhada
2. Dançando no Escuro
3. Compacto
4. Magrela Fever
5. Kyoto
6. JapanPopShow
7. Misterio Stereo
8. Saida Bangú
9. Mal Estar Card
10. Caixa Preta
11. Sambito (Totaru Shock)
12. Esperança
13. Fumanchú

== Release history ==
Region	Date	Label
United States	4 November 2008	Quannum Projects
Japan	2008	JVC – Victor Entertainment
