= Pélico =

Brazilian singer, songwriter, and guitarist

- Birth name: Robson Pélico
- Born: 31 January 1976 (age 49); São Paulo, Brazil
- Genres: Música popular brasileira, indie rock
- Occupation: singer-songwriter
- Years active: 2006–present
- Website: www.pelico.com.br

Robson Pélico (born 31 January 1976), known simply as Pélico (Portuguese pronunciation: [ˈpɛliku]), is a Brazilian singer, songwriter, and guitarist.

== Career ==
Although Pélico began performing music in the 1990s, and even recorded an album titled Melodrama (Dicionário Cravo Albin da Música Popular Brasileira) in 2003 (calls early album "renegado"), his musical career began in 2006. Pélico's first album O último dia de um homem sem juízo was released by Monga Records / Tratore in 2008.

Pélico's album Que isso fique entre nós was released by YB Music on 16 July 2011. All sixteen tracks on the album were written by Pélico; two songs, "Minha dor" and "Não corra, não mate, não morra", have additional writing credit to Cristiane Lisbôa and Estêvão Bertoni, respectively. Bass guitarist Jesus Sanchez from the São Paulo–based trio Los Pirata was the producer of the album and played on many of the tracks.

Pélico's third album Euforia was released in 2015. A recording of the song "Não há cabeça" by Ângela Rô Rô was included on the soundtrack of the Globo network's primetime telenovela Velho Chico in 2016.

== Discography ==
- Melodrama (2003)
- O último dia de um homem sem juízo (2008)
- Que isso fique entre nós (2011)
- Euforia (2015)

== Recognition ==
- Rolling Stone Brasil named the single "Não éramos tão assim" as No. 19 in its top 100 list for 2011.
