= Pearpop =

Social Media Collaboration Platform in Los Angeles, CA United States

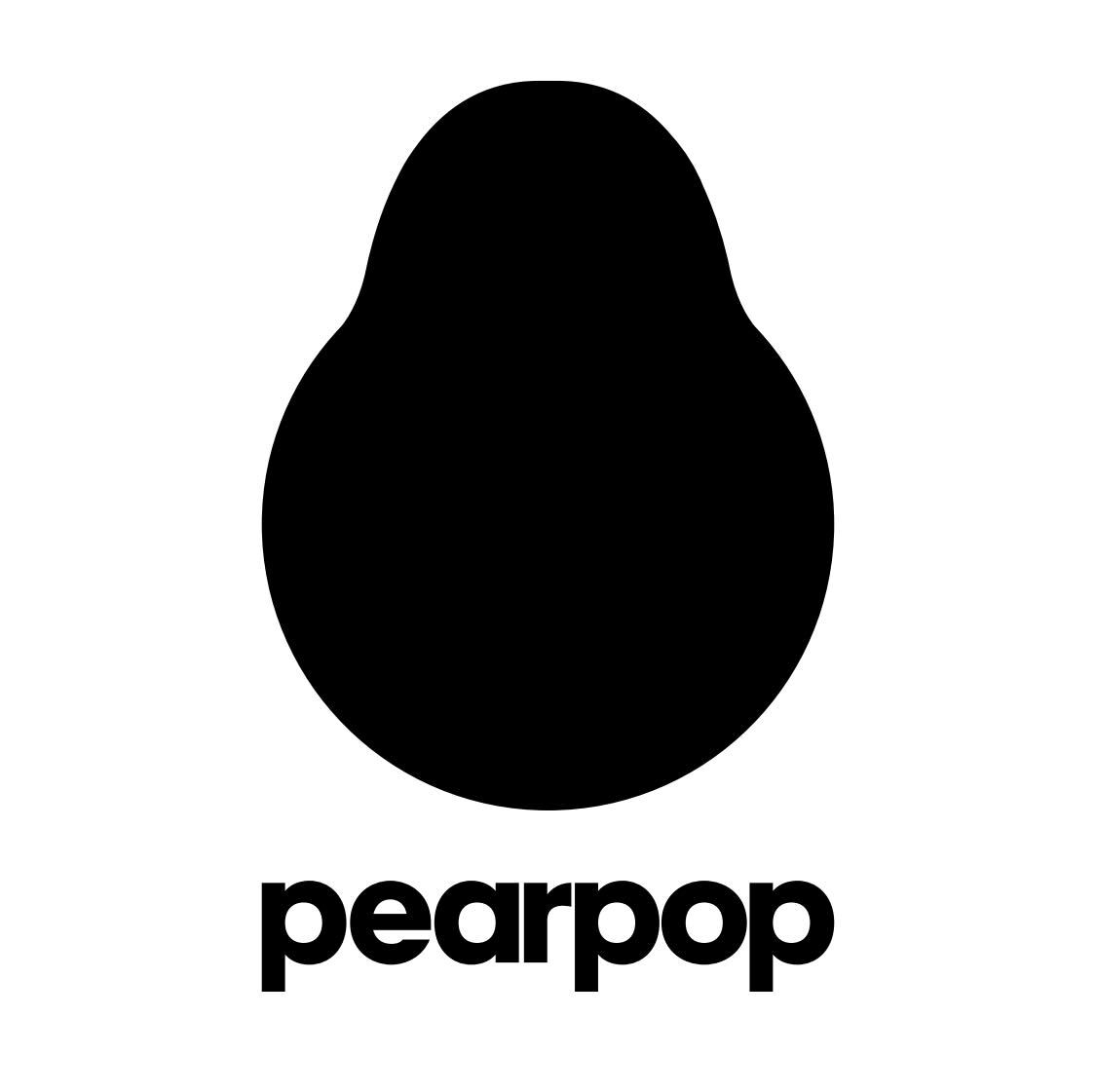
- Type: Private
- Industry: Social Media
- Founded: October 2020
- Founder: Cole Mason, Guy Oseary
- Headquarters: Los Angeles, United States
- Area served: Worldwide
- Key people: Cole Mason, Guy Oseary, Alex Morrison
- Website: www.pearpop.com

Pearpop is an American social media collaboration platform headquartered in Los Angeles. The company was co-founded by former creator Cole Mason and talent manager Guy Oseary in October 2020. The platform enables brands to discover and activate social media creators for social media campaigns, instantly and at scale. A recognized market leader, Pearpop was named to Fast Company's Most Innovative Companies List and named "Influencer Marketing Platform of the Year" by Digiday in 2022.

== History ==
=== Founding ===
Cole Mason, an ex-YouTube creator and model signed to Ford Models, co-founded the company with talent manager and music industry luminary Guy Oseary in October 2020. After identifying that there was no platform that allowed creators to predictably secure paid brand collaboration deals, Mason set out to build a platform designed to disrupt the talent booking business for the creator economy.

=== Overview ===
Pearpop is a technology platform that "pairs" brands to the right creators for social media campaigns, directly enabling brand-to-creator collaboration. The use of technology to match brands and creators has been likened to other high-growth marketplace businesses and led Forbes to compare Pearpop to Uber or Airbnb, calling it the "Uber or Airbnb of the creator economy."

Pearpop's platform challenges and disrupts the standard model of influencer marketing which conventionally has relied on a very manual, costly agency model in order to exist. Pearpop brand campaigns typically pay creators on a pay-for-performance basis, allowing creators to be compensated more as their videos succeed in social media. The company works with large Fortune 500 brands including Netflix, Amazon, Microsoft, and others, as well as musical artists like Shawn Mendes, Doja Cat, and Madonna.

=== Creator Community ===
The company has amassed the largest known community of vetted social media creators, more than 200,000 as of 2023, with the mission to help creators "Earn a Living Doing What You Love." Collaborations with brands are one of the most consistent ways for creators to monetize their audience and make money, and Pearpop provides brand deals. Operating across TikTok, Instagram, and Twitter, its community includes celebrities including Heidi Klum, Loren Gray, Snoop Dogg and Tony Hawk, among others.

=== Recognition & Milestones ===
- Pearpop was named to 2022 Fast Company's Most Company's Innovative Companies List, at #7 on the Social Media List
- Pearpop was named the "Airbnb of the Creator Economy" by Forbes
- CEO Cole Mason was named to the prestigious Forbes 30 under 30 List in November 2021
- In 2022, Pearpop appointed advertising & marketing executive Alex Morrison as Chief Marketing Officer
- In June 2022, Pearpop launched the first ever TikTok Live scripted comedy series, starring TikTok star Jericho Menke.
- In November 2022, Pearpop announced it had raised an additional $18M at a $300 million valuation
- In July 2023, Pearpop introduced a new feature, "Boost Mode", that lets brands turn creator content into paid ads

=== Fundraising History ===
In April 2021, Pearpop announced it raised a $10 million Series A from Alexis Ohanian's venture capital firm Seven Seven Six, following its $6 million seed round from Guy Oseary and Ashton Kutcher. The company also has a variety of angel investors including Amy Schumer, The Chainsmokers, Diddy, Gary Vaynerchuk and others.

In November 2022, Pearpop announced it had raised an additional $18M at a $300 million valuation
