= Samba rock =

Genre of samba

- Stylistic origins: MPB; samba; rock; soul; funk; psychedelia; bossa nova; blues; jazz
- Cultural origins: Late 1950s, São Paulo, Brazil

Regional scenes
- Brazil

Other topics
- Lusophone music; sambalanço; tropicália

Samba rock (also known as samba soul or confused with samba funk and sambalanço) is a Brazilian dance culture and music genre that fuses samba with rock, soul, and funk. It emerged from the dance parties of São Paulo's lower-class black communities after they had been exposed to rock and roll and African-American music in the late 1950s.

As a development of 1960s música popular brasileira (MPB), the genre was pioneered by recording acts such as Jorge Ben, Tim Maia, and Trio Mocotó. It gained a wider popularity in the following decades after breaking through into discotheques. By the 2000s, samba rock had grown into a broader cultural movement involving dancers, disc jockeys, scholars, and musicians, who reinvented the genre in a modernized form.

== Origins ==
Samba rock's origins lie in the predominantly black favelas of São Paulo during the late 1950s, when Brazilian radio and dance halls were reached by the global spread of American rock and roll and related African-American music such as blues and jazz. Its first incarnation was as a dance phenomenon at community block parties that began to play these styles alongside traditional samba and bolero music. These parties eventually moved to larger venues hosted by disc jockeys.

The first known samba-rock deejay Osvaldo Pereira—known by his stage name "Orquestra Invisível (Invisible Orchestra) Let’s Dance"—debuted in 1958 in downtown São Paulo. "The parties started to get crowded, and the rooms for the parties started to get larger", Pereira recounted. "Then, I thought of building my own equipment, which had to be powerful, and faithful to the sound of the live orchestras." His early equipment included a 100-watt sound system featuring a rudimentary version of a crossover, which allowed Pereira to control the frequencies of the music.

== Dance culture ==
In the earliest samba-rock parties, deejays played music from a number of genres, including Partido Alto sambas and Italian rock, while attendees joined in pairs and engaged in rock and roll (Lindy Hop, Rockabilly) and samba dances (Samba de Gafieira). In 1957, Brazilian pianist Waldir Calmon recorded a samba version of Bill Haley's "Rock Around the Clock", which was a turning point for the events; according to Brazilian journalist Beatriz Miranda, "gradually, partygoers turned all the rock and samba moves into one single dance style, later named samba rock."

The dances of samba rock honor an exchange between the original music and a variety of other styles, according to Mestre Ataliba, one of São Paulo's first samba-rock dance instructors. "Dance wise, samba rock is about relaxation and concentration, all at once", he said. "It blends the African 'ginga' (body flow from Capoeira), which is present at the feet and the hips, and the European reference of the ballroom etiquette. We can dance it to the sound of Rita Pavone, samba pagode, reggae, R&B. It really embraces every music culture".

== Musical development ==
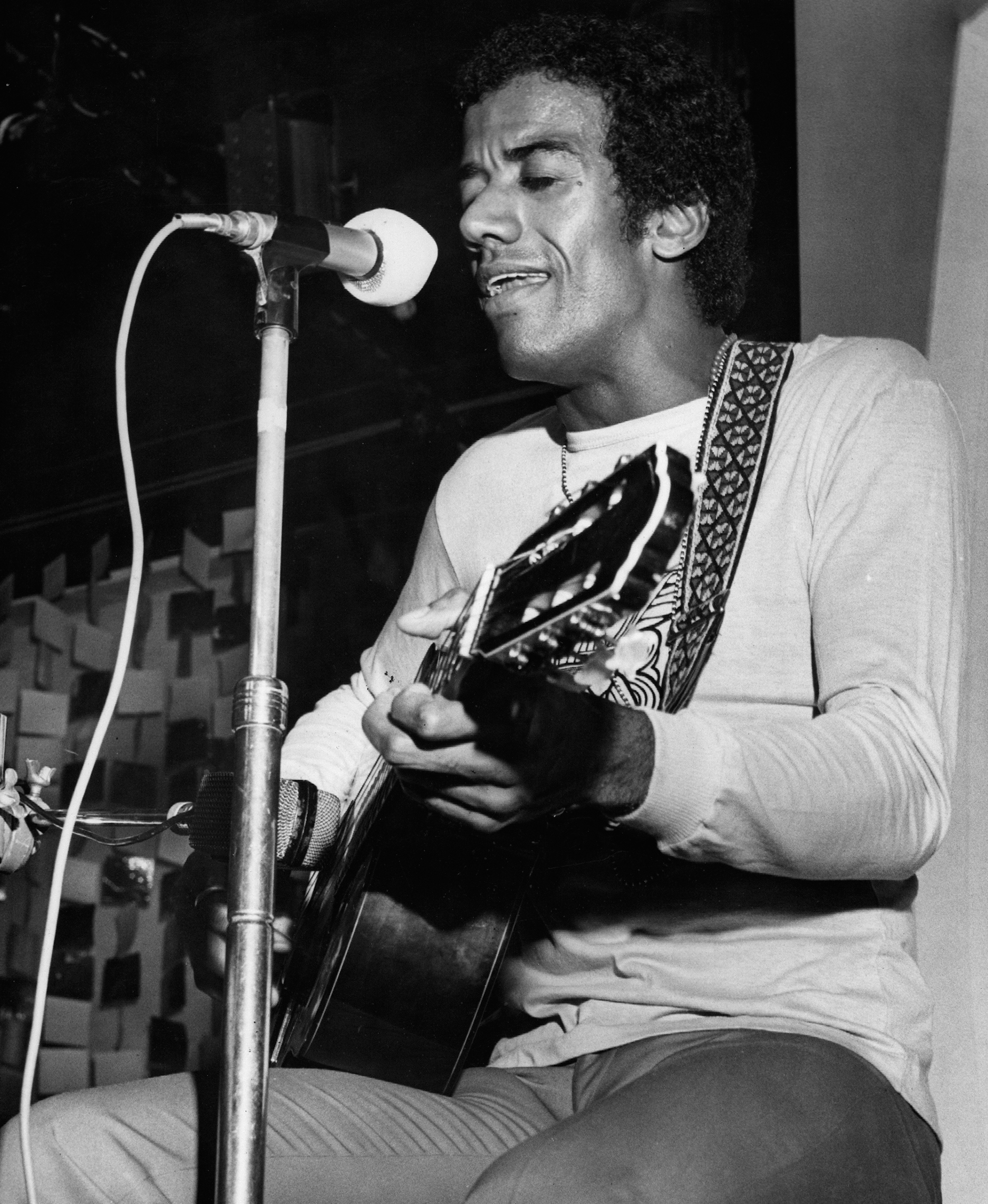
Jorge Ben in 1972

The samba-rock genre developed during the 1960s with popular Brazilian recording musicians who fused samba with American rock, soul, and funk influences. This development occurred alongside the Tropicália artistic movement within mid-1960s música popular brasileira (MPB), which itself had modernized traditional bossa nova rhythms with influences from other Brazilian and international pop rock sounds. Originators of samba rock included Trio Mocotó, Tim Maia, and Jorge Ben, who has been considered the "father of samba rock".

Ben's early music contributed significantly to the genre's rhythmic identity. Departing from bossa nova's European musical influences, the singer drew on African-American styles—such as jazz, rhythm and blues, and eventually soul, funk, and rock music—to develop a unique rhythm, which he called "sacundim sacundem". Stylistically, Ben combined samba with instruments and features from rock and roll, including the electric guitar, drum kit, and reverberation. According to Impose magazine's Jacob McKean, "the horn-heavy big band sound" on the song "Take It Easy My Brother Charles" (from Ben's 1969 self-titled album) is a key element of the genre. His 1970 album Fôrça Bruta, recorded with Trio Mocotó, was also pioneering of samba rock in its fusion of the band's groove-based accompaniment and the more rockish rhythms of Ben's guitar. Their instrumental set-ups during the 1970s often featured guitar, the pandeiro, and the timbau, a traditional drum.

Many other musicians emulated and expanded on Ben's style. Their sound became known as samba rock; it has also been referred to as samba soul, samba funk, and sambalanço (a portmanteau of samba and balanço, meaning swing or beat in Portuguese). The genre became defined by the drum kit, bass guitar, keyboard, brass instruments, a strong groove, and "tumxicutumxicutum", an onomatopoeia referring to samba rock's distinctive rhythm. According to Clube do Balanço vocalist and guitarist Marco Mattoli, "the song must always be good to dance to, otherwise it does not make sense. It does limit the composing process, but creates a cultural identity to our band. Today, we cannot see it as rock, samba, soul or funk anymore. Samba rock turned into an original thing."

== Popularity and modernization ==
Samba rock reached mainstream audiences in the late 1960s. It became more popular during the 1970s and 1980s, especially in discotheques. This gave more exposure to Ben, Trio Mocotó, and other acts from São Paulo's black music scene, although none of them declared themselves samba-rock artists. Ben's songs in particular became enduring favorites at traditional samba-rock parties. In subsequent years, samba rock developed from a dance phenomenon and music style into a complex cultural movement, involving musicians, producers, DJs, dancers, visual artists, and scholars. The parties eventually came to include big bands and hip hop, alongside samba music.

"Samba Rock Samba" (2006)
An example of modern samba rock, by Ruy Humberto da Silva Camargo

In the early 2000s, the genre was refashioned in a more modernized form featuring electronic samples, departing from the traditional set-up of Ben and Trio Mocotó's 1970s music. This newer form was typified by the bands Sandália de Prata and Clube do Balanço, who first played middle-class areas of São Paulo. The new wave of artists deliberately created music that would suit samba-rock dances. In 2001, Universal Music Brasil capitalized on this resurgence of samba rock with the "Samba Soul" reissue series, re-releasing albums by Ben and other 1970s performers of the style. Ben, who still performed at this time, was recognized by Time Out as an "aging maestro" representative of the "favela samba rock" contingent in the contemporary MPB scene.

Samba rock's modernization has seen its incorporation into dance academy curriculum, gym classes, party productions, dance collectives, and other events. Samba-rock dance forms of the past were revisited in the 2000s by black Brazilian and dance-club culture, as well as Brazilian hip hop groups such as Soul Sisters. Samba-rock culture has also faced debates surrounding gender equality. An advocacy project, "Samba Rock Mulheres" (English: "Samba Rock Women"), was created in response to the marginalization of women as supporting dancers to the predominantly male stars at dance events.

In 2010, three figures associated with the samba-rock movement—dancer Jorge Yoshida, musician Marco Mattoli, and producer Nego Júnior—started a grassroots campaign to have samba rock registered as a cultural heritage of São Paulo. The campaign eventually attracted the participation of various artists, musical groups, producers, political leaders, and citizens of São Paulo. In November 2016, the Municipal Council of Historic, Cultural and Environmental Preservation of the City of São Paulo (CONPRESP) finally declared samba rock a cultural heritage of the municipality.

== See also ==
- Culture of Brazil
- Jovem Guarda
- Latin rock

== Bibliography ==
- Castro, Ruy (2003). Bossa Nova: The Story of the Brazilian Music That Seduced the World. Chicago Review Press. ISBN 1556524943.
- Footner, Andrew, ed. (2007). Time Out Rio de Janeiro. Time Out Guides. ISBN 978-1846700453.
- Gomes, Tom (18 August 2001). "AmericaLatina...". Billboard.
- Hermes, Will (March 2002). "Rackjobbing". Spin.
- Junior, Nego (11 November 2016). "Samba rock é registrado como patrimônio cultural imaterial da cidade de São Paulo". Samba Rock Na Veia (in Portuguese).
- Katsnelson, Anna, ed. (2009). Time Out São Paulo. Time Out Guides. ISBN 978-1846701269.
- McCann, Bryan (2004). "Black Pau: Unconvering the History of Brazilian Soul". In Hernandez, Deborah Pacini; Fernández l'Hoeste, Héctor D.; Zolov, Eric (eds.). Rockin' Las Américas: The Global Politics of Rock in Latin/o America. University of Pittsburgh Press. ISBN 0822972557.
- McKean, Jacob (2008). "Jorge Ben Jorge Ben (1969) + Força Bruta". Impose.
- Miranda, Beatriz (11 September 2018). "Tracing The Evolution Of Samba Rock In São Paulo". Vinyl Me, Please.
- Nestrovski, Arthur Rosenblat (2002). Música Popular Brasileira Hoje (in Portuguese). Vol. 50. Publifolha. ISBN 8574024058.
- Parahyba, Jõao (21 September 2005). "Uma Noite Ben Jor". Trip (in Portuguese).
- Pardue, Derek (2008). Ideologies of Marginality in Brazilian Hip Hop. Springer Publishing. ISBN 978-0230613409.
