= Negro É Lindo =

Studio album by Jorge Ben
- Released: 1971
- Genre: Samba rock, samba
- Length: 34:35
- Label: Philips
- Producer: Paulinho Tapajós

Jorge Ben chronology
Fôrça Bruta (1970)	Negro É Lindo (1971)	Ben (1972)

Professional ratings
Review scores
Source	Rating
Tom Hull – on the Web	B+

Negro É Lindo is the eighth album by Brazilian artist Jorge Ben, released in 1971. The title is a translation of the slogan "Black is beautiful" to Portuguese. The album has a song called "Cassius Marcelo Clay" paying homage to boxer and black activist Muhammad Ali.

== Track listing ==
All songs composed by Jorge Ben except when noted.

No.	Title	Writer(s)	Length
1.	"Rita Jeep"		3:02
2.	"Porque É Proibido Pisar na Grama"		4:54
3.	"Cassius Marcello Clay"	Jorge Ben, Toquinho	3:41
4.	"Cigana"		3:14
5.	"Zula"		2:56
6.	"Negro É Lindo"		3:03
7.	"Comanche"		2:55
8.	"Que Maravilha"	Jorge Ben, Toquinho	4:05
9.	"Maria Domingas"		3:41
10.	"Palomaris"		3:04
