= César Guerra-Peixe =

Brazilian musician (1914–1993)

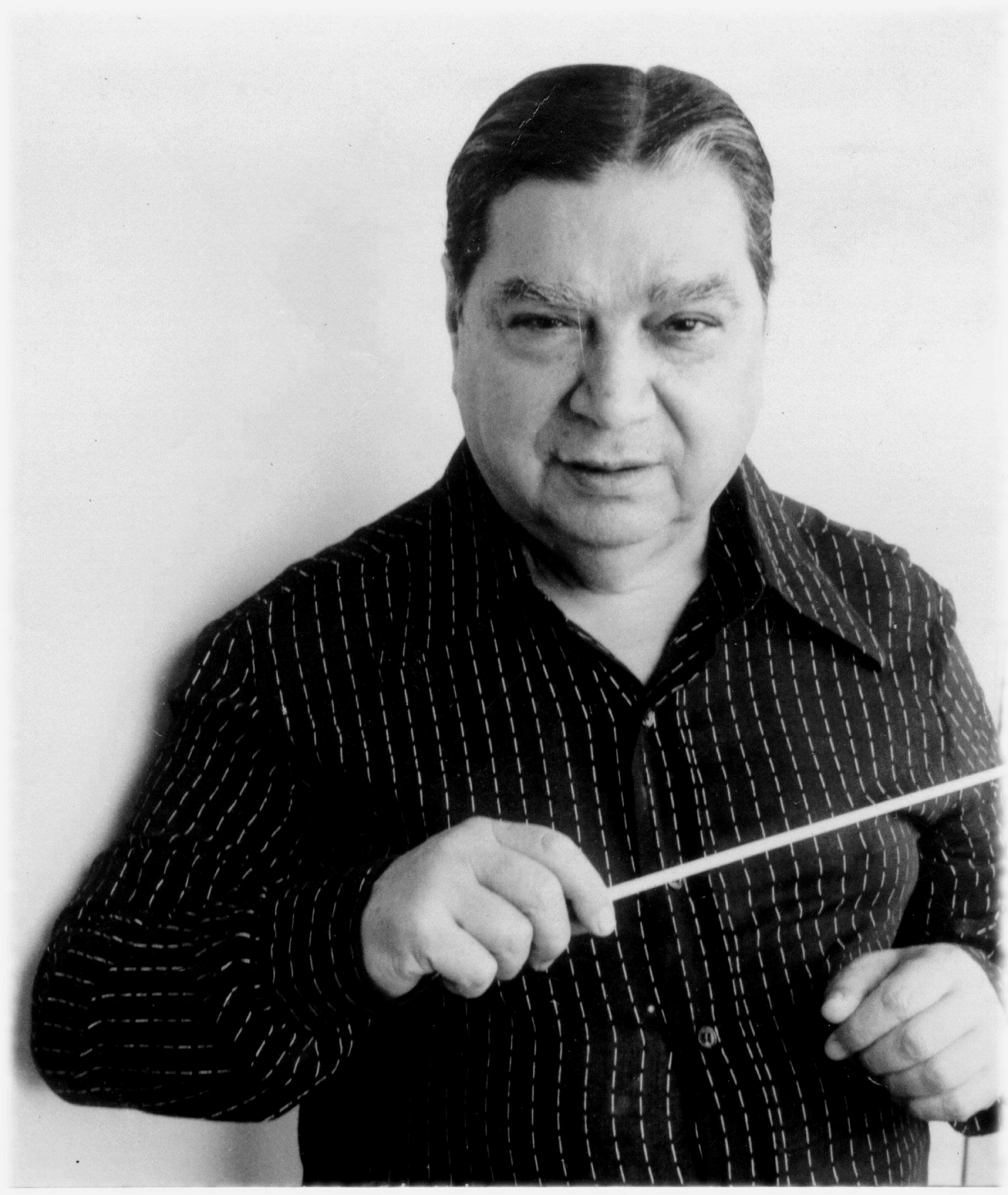
- Born: César Guerra-Peixe; 18 March 1914; Petrópolis, Rio de Janeiro, Brazil
- Died: 26 November 1993 (aged 79)
- Occupations: Violinist; composer; conductor

César Guerra-Peixe (March 18, 1914 – November 26, 1993) was a Brazilian violinist, composer, and conductor.

== Biography ==
Guerra-Peixe was born in Petrópolis, son of Portuguese immigrants with Romani origins. Throughout his lifetime, Guerra-Peixe held numerous positions playing in orchestras and working as a composer and arranger in the production of radio broadcasts, recording, films, and cultural documentaries. His music can be heard in many Brazilian films, such as Terra é Sempre Terra, O Canto do Mar, Quero Essa Mulher Tanto Assim, Riacho de Sangue, Meu Nome é Lampião, and Soledade.

Although he strongly embraced serialist techniques through his compositional studies with Koellreutter, Guerra-Peixe took a strong interest in northeastern Brazilian traditional music and culture and integrated elements of Brazilian nationalism to varying degrees in his compositions. While living in Recife, Guerra-Peixe conducted field work on traditional Brazilian music and culture, and he published numerous articles based on his research in the Revista Brasileira de Folclore. He is particularly well known for his lifelong dedication and contributions to the research and promotion of Brazilian culture.

The Concertino for Violin and Orchestra is a virtuosic work for violin inspired by the sonorities of the rabeca (Brazilian folk fiddle) and re-contextualized for the classical violin. In northeastern Brazilian culture, the rabeca is used to accompany an array of traditional dance forms, folkloric ensembles, and street plays. The Concertino utilizes the full technical capabilities of the violin while reflecting the rhythmic and modal sonorities of the rabeca in an orchestral atmosphere that recalls the traditional music and culture of the Brazilian northeast.

As an ethnomusicologist, he wrote an important book Os Maracatus do Recife (1955, second edition 1980) on maracatu.

He died in Rio de Janeiro.

== Discography ==
1. Jornada da Lapinha nº 1/Jornada da Lapinha nº 2 (1955) Copacabana 78
2. Chora na rampa (1959) Chantecler 78
3. Cidade Maravilhosa/Menina-moça (1960) Chantecler 78
4. Vassourinhas (1961) Chantecler 78
5. Escuta, Levino/Quarta-feira de cinzas (1962) Chantecler 78
6. Sambas clássicos (sem data) Chantecler LP
7. Sedução do norte (1978) RGE/Fermata LP
8. A retirada da Laguna. Orquestra Sinfônica Nacional da Rádio MEC (1997) CD
9. Eliane Tokeshi e Guida Borghoff - Guerra-Peixe: Obras Para Violino e Piano (YB Music, 2011)
10. Goiás Philharmonic Orchestra conducted by Neil Thomson - Guerra-Peixe: Symphonic Suites Nos. 1 & 2 (Naxos 8.573925, 2022)
