= Guy Oseary =

American talent manager (born 1972)

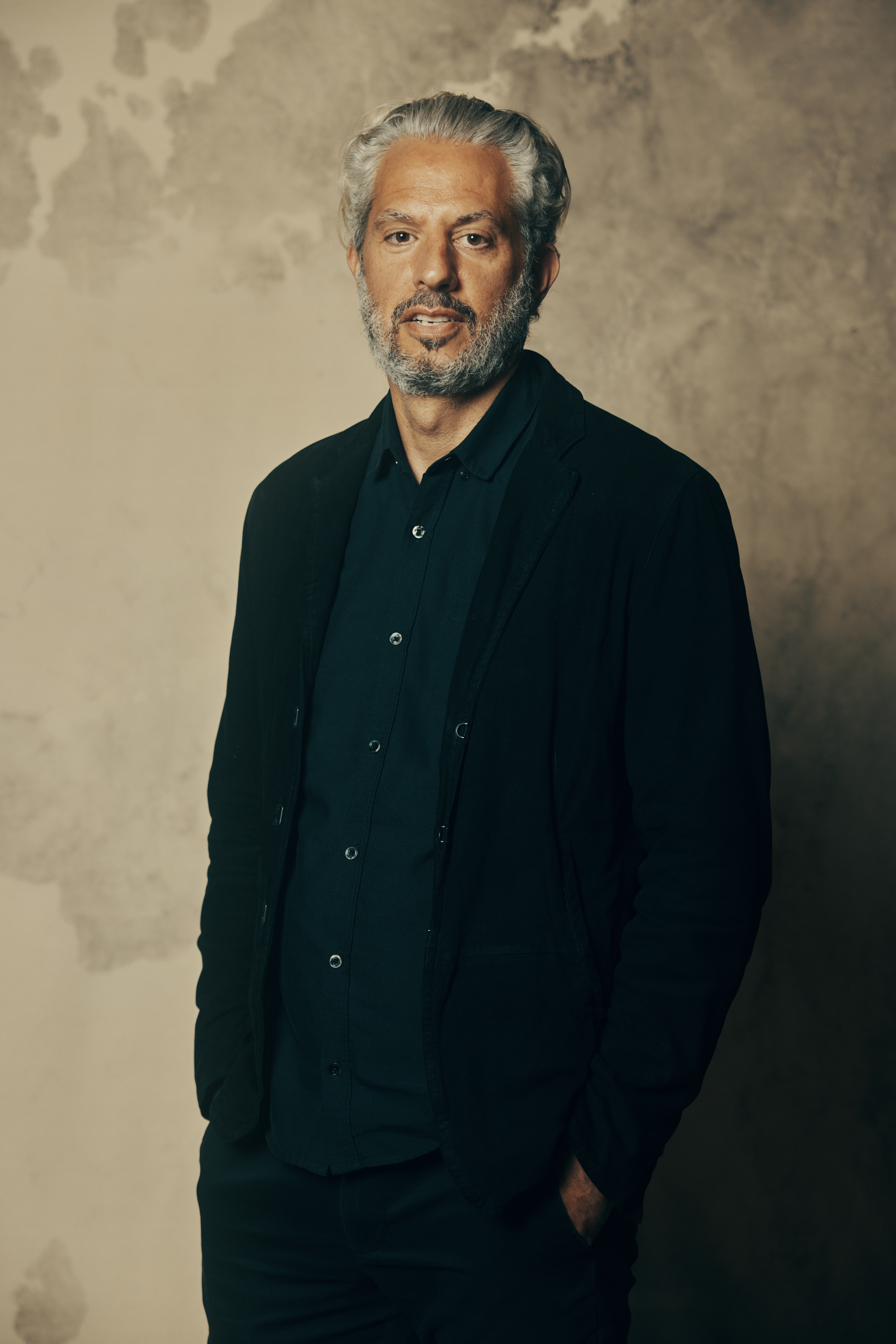
- Guy Oseary in 2022
- Born: October 3, 1972 (age 54); Jerusalem, Israel
- Citizenship: United States
- Education: Beverly Hills High School
- Occupations: Talent manager, technology investor, writer, entrepreneur
- Years active: 1987–present
- Notable work: On the Record
- Television: Last Call with Carson Daly (executive producer)
- Spouse: Michelle Alves (m. 2017)
- Children: 4
- Awards: Variety's 2022 Music Mogul of the year Billboard Touring Awards Top Manager: 2006, 2009, 2016

Guy Harley Oseary (born October 3, 1972) is an American talent manager, investor and writer. His clients include Madonna and the Red Hot Chili Peppers. He founded the investment companies A-Grade Investments and Sound Ventures.

== Early life ==
Guy Oseary was born on October 3, 1972, in Jerusalem, Israel to a Jewish family. He moved to California when he was eight, and attended Beverly Hills High School.

== Career ==
Oseary started Wise Guy Prods as an independent A&R rep in 1989 at the age of 17. Ice-T's DJ Evil E and his brother Hen-Gee were his first major signings as a manager.

=== Maverick ===
In 1992 at the age of 19, he became one of the first employees of Madonna's Maverick Records record label, as an A&R executive. He rose through the ranks to chairman, developing a roster of artists that included The Prodigy, Alanis Morissette, Muse, Deftones, and Paul Oakenfold, and worked on the soundtracks on such film series as Austin Powers, The Matrix, and Kill Bill. He signed Morissette in 1995, and in 1996 her album Jagged Little Pill became the biggest selling album of the year, and eventually one of the best selling albums of all time.

In 2005, Oseary became the manager for his longtime business partner Madonna. Her Confessions Tour (2006), Sticky & Sweet Tour (2008–09), and The MDNA Tour (2012), were among the highest-grossing concert tours of all time. He won Top Manager at the Billboard Touring Awards in 2006 and 2009. In 2007, Oseary negotiated a 360 deal partnering Madonna with Live Nation worth $120 million. In 2016, he again won Top Manager at the Billboard Touring Awards.

As part of Maverick Films, Oseary executive produced all five films of The Twilight Saga: Twilight, New Moon, Eclipse, Breaking Dawn – Part 1, and Breaking Dawn – Part 2, as well as Rob Zombie's first two ventures into feature filmmaking: House of 1000 Corpses and The Devil's Rejects. He also produced the films Percy Jackson & the Olympians: The Lightning Thief, and Agent Cody Banks.

On November 12, 2013, it was announced that Oseary would be replacing Paul McGuinness as manager of U2 in a $30 million deal which would see Live Nation buy both Maverick and U2's management company Principle Management. McGuinness was quoted as saying "I have long regarded Guy Oseary as the best manager of his generation, and there is no one else I would have considered to take over the day-to-day running of our business." He managed U2 until October 2022. He began managing the Red Hot Chili Peppers in 2021.

In 2014, Oseary relaunched Maverick as a consortium of nine artist managers. The artist managers managed over two dozen of the world's largest musical acts, including Madonna, Paul McCartney, U2, Miley Cyrus, Britney Spears, Shania Twain, and Nicki Minaj.

In March 2020, Oseary stepped down from his role at Maverick, reportedly to concentrate more on his "entrepreneurial interests, investing in and incubating companies on the cutting edge of technology and entertainment”, according to a statement by Live Nation.

=== Red Hot Chili Peppers ===
Oseary began managing the Red Hot Chili Peppers in 2021. According to Rolling Stone Magazine, the band was the highest earning non-solo musical act in 2021, with $145 million.

In January 2024 it was announced that Scar Tissue, the autobiography of Anthony Kiedis, singer for the Red Hot Chili Peppers, will be turned into a theatrical movie with Oseary, Kiedis and Brian Grazer producing the film for Universal Pictures.

== Other work ==
In May 2004, Oseary partnered with Jason Weinberg and Stephanie Simon to become a principal in Untitled Entertainment, a management company with offices in Beverly Hills and New York City.

Oseary appears in cameos in movies such as Charlie's Angels, Charlie's Angels: Full Throttle, and You Don't Mess with the Zohan. He also made a cameo in Madonna's 1992 music video for her single "Deeper and Deeper."

He also served as executive producer on NBC's Last Call with Carson Daly and New Year's Eve with Carson Daly, starting in 2002.

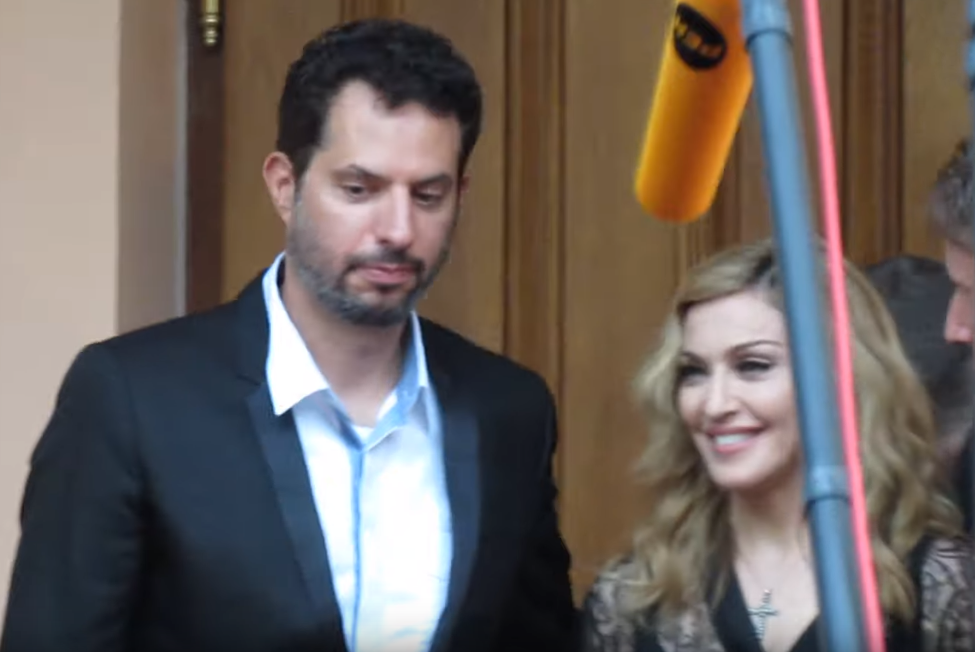
Guy Oseary and Madonna during the opening of Hard Candy Fitness in 2012

In 2010, Madonna and Oseary founded gym chain Hard Candy Fitness. They also partnered with Iconix Brand Group in 2011 to launch the lifestyle brand "Truth or Dare by Madonna."

In October 2020, he co-founded Pearpop with Cole Mason.

== Investments ==
=== A-Grade Investments ===
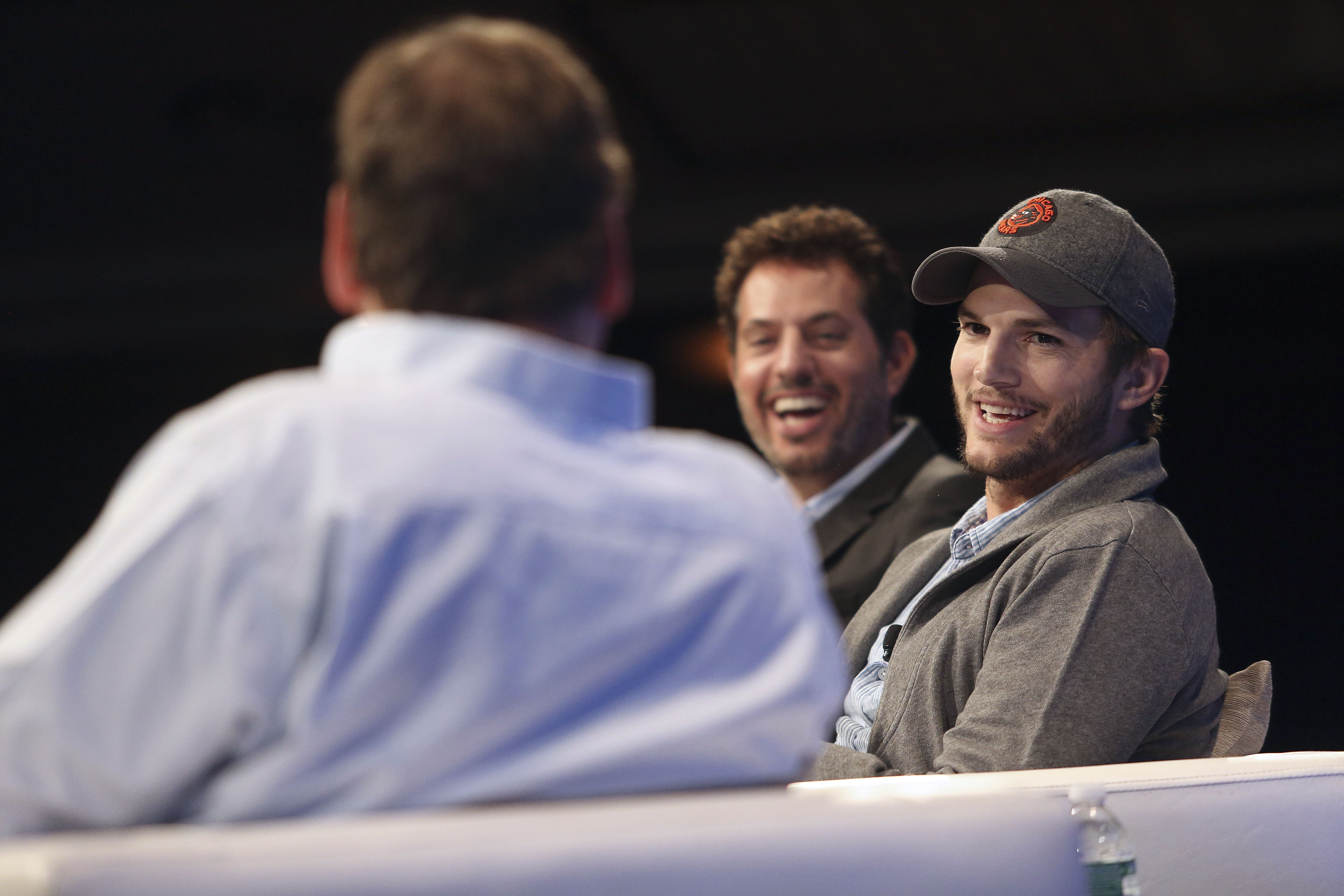
Michael Arrington interviewing Oseary and Ashton Kutcher at TechCrunch Disrupt 2013 in New York

Oseary, along with Ashton Kutcher and Ronald Burkle, is a co-founder at A-Grade Investments, a venture capital firm that has made numerous investments in companies such as Airbnb, Duolingo, Foursquare, Shazam, SoundCloud, Spotify, and Uber.

=== Sound Ventures ===
Oseary co-founded Sound Ventures in 2015 with Ashton Kutcher to focus on emerging technologies at the intersection of entertainment and AI. The co-founders were featured on the cover of the April 19, 2016 issue of Forbes for the magazine's story on top tech investors. As of July 2022, Variety reported the pair had invested over $600 million in platforms across a wide spectrum of sectors, including social networks, fintech, alternative energy, health care, mobile gaming, sustainability, virtual fashion and SaaS (Software as a Service). In 2024, they launched a $243 million VC fund to invest in artificial intelligence companies. As of July 2024, the firm reportedly managed over $1 billion in assets across its various funds. Investments include OpenAI, Anthropic, and Stability AI.

=== NFTs ===
In October 2021, Oseary signed Yuga Labs, the creators of the Bored Ape Yacht Club (BAYC) non-fungible token (NFT) project, for representation.

=== Books ===
Oseary has written four books, including a book on Jewish influences in the music industry titled Jews Who Rock. His second book, On the Record, is a collection of first-hand accounts on how to break into the music industry from successful artists, producers, and executives. He also wrote two coffee table books with his own photography of Madonna's 2006 and 2008–09 tours respectively titled Madonna: Confessions and Madonna: Sticky & Sweet.

=== Philanthropy ===
In 2012, Oseary co-founded Good Today (previously Good St.), a non-profit giving platform. The company encourages donations as small as $0.25 and allows donors to vote to select where the funds are donated each day.

=== Personal life ===
According to the magazine New York, Oseary has been married to Brazilian model Michelle Alves since 2006.
