= On the Record (book) =

2004 book by Guy Oseary

On the Record: Over 150 of the most talented people in music share the secrets of their success is a 2004 book written by entertainment manager Guy Oseary and published by Penguin Books.

The book features in-depth interviews with more than 150 music recording artists, record executives, A&R executives, label chiefs, songwriters, and record producers. Oseary spoke with performers like James Brown and Bono, asking them a similar set of questions about their experiences in music. In writing the book, Oseary also offered a personal reflection on how to succeed in the music industry.

== Interviewees ==
Some of the music elite who were interviewed for the book:

Artists:

- James Brown
- Elton John
- Bono
- Madonna
- Ozzy Osbourne
- Keith Richards
- Brian Wilson
- Alicia Keys
- Fiona Apple
- John Frusciante

Producers/Songwriters:

- Rick Rubin
- Sir George Martin
- Jermaine Dupri
- Giorgio Moroder
- David Foster
- Daniel Lanois

A&R Wizards and Executives:

- Lyor Cohen
- Tom Whalley
- Guy Oseary
- Ron Handler
- Bruce Lundvall
- John Kalodner

Legends:

- Quincy Jones
- Russell Simmons
- Dick Clark
- Seymour Stein
- Chris Blackwell
- Ahmet Ertegün
- Berry Gordy

Attorneys:

- John Branca
- Fred Davis
- Eric Greenspan
- Don Passman

Managers:

- Irving Azoff
- Paul McGuinness
- Benny Medina

Television and Film:

- Judy McGrath
- Tom Freston
- John Sykes
- McG
