= Curumin =

Brazilian singer, songwriter and producer (born 1976)

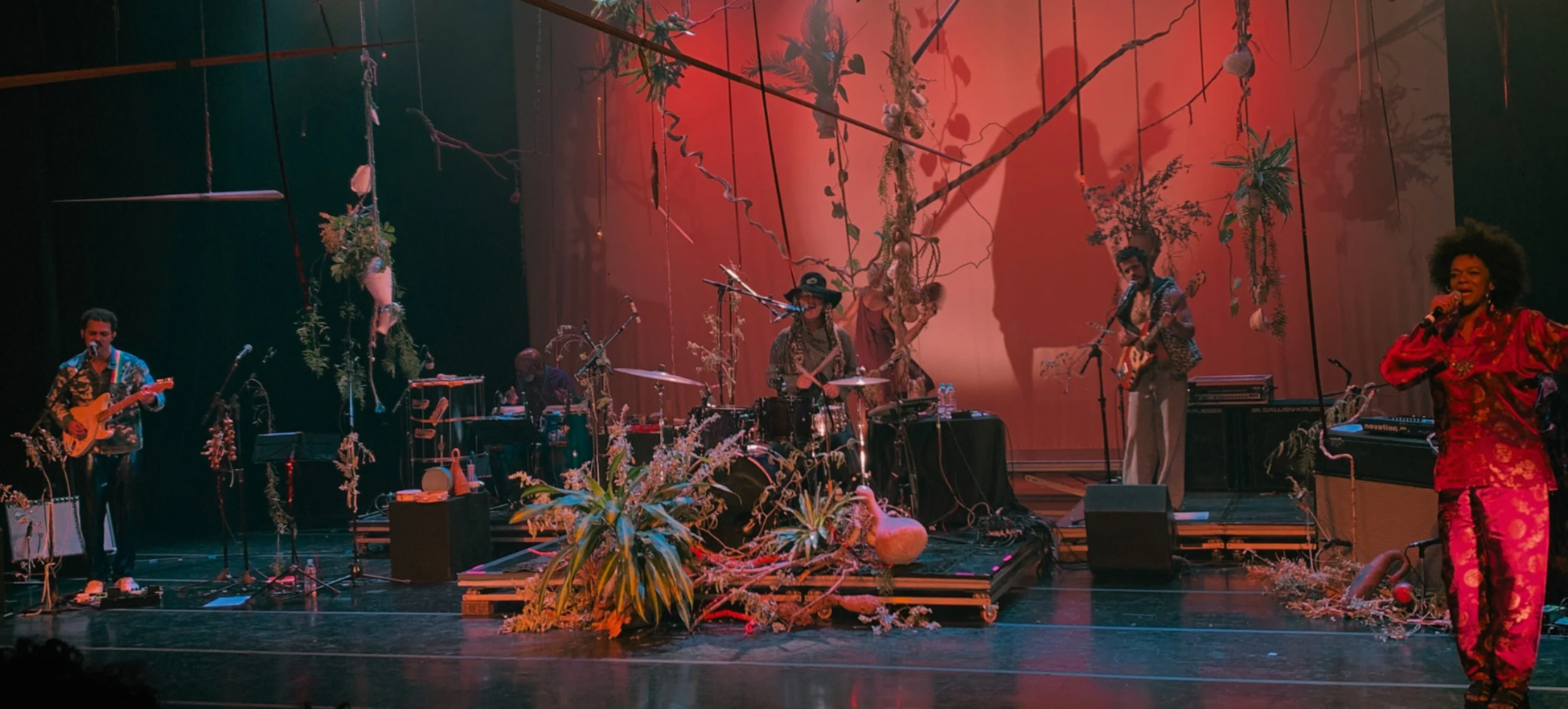

Background information
- Born: Luciano Nakata Albuquerque; July 28, 1976 (age 50); São Paulo, Brazil
- Origin: São Paulo, Brazil
- Genres: MPB, samba, funk, jazz, hip-hop, bossa nova
- Occupations: Singer, songwriter, multi-instrumentalist, record producer
- Instruments: Vocals, drums, percussion, guitar, bass, keyboards
- Years active: 2000s–present
- Labels: YB Music, Quannum Projects, Brasuca Discos

Luciano Nakata Albuquerque (born 28 July 1976), known professionally as Curumin, is a Brazilian singer, songwriter, multi-instrumentalist and record producer. Emerging from São Paulo’s independent music scene in the mid-2000s, he became known for blending samba, funk, jazz, hip-hop and electronic music within the framework of Música Popular Brasileira (MPB). His work has received international press coverage and distribution in the United States, Europe and Japan.

== Early life and background ==
Curumin was born in São Paulo, Brazil, to a family of Japanese and Spanish descent. His stage name derives from the Tupi-Guarani word curumim, meaning “boy.” He began performing as a drummer and percussionist in his youth and later worked as a backing musician for Brazilian artists including Arnaldo Antunes, Céu, Vanessa da Mata and Criolo.

== Career ==
=== Breakthrough and international recognition ===
Curumin released his debut album Achados e Perdidos in 2005 through the São Paulo label YB Music. The album was subsequently licensed to the U.S. independent label Quannum Projects, marking his introduction to North American and European audiences.

His second album, JapanPopShow (2008), was released internationally and received coverage in American media. Writing in The New York Times, Jon Pareles described Curumin as “one of the most astute young musicians in São Paulo,” noting his ability to merge Brazilian rhythms with American funk traditions.

JapanPopShow was also reviewed by Billboard, which highlighted the album’s “kaleidoscopic blend of samba, funk and hip-hop.”

=== Arrocha and Boca ===
Curumin’s 2012 album Arrocha expanded his use of electronic textures and socially engaged lyrics. In 2017 he released Boca, which was nominated for the Latin Grammy Award for Best Portuguese Language Rock or Alternative Album.

Coverage in Brazilian and international outlets cited the album’s political themes and dense rhythmic arrangements.

=== Pedra de Selva ===
In 2024, Curumin released Pedra de Selva. The album was included among the Associação Paulista de Críticos de Arte (APCA) selections for best Brazilian albums of the year.

== International touring ==
Curumin has toured extensively in North America, Europe and Japan. He has appeared at events including Central Park SummerStage in New York, the Chicago World Music Festival, and CMJ Music Marathon in New York.

He has also toured internationally with Céu, performing at venues such as Joe’s Pub in New York and festivals in the United Kingdom and continental Europe.

== Sync licensing and compilations ==
Curumin contributed a remix of “Ela” (Ticklah Remix) to the 2011 charitable compilation Red Hot + Rio 2, released by the Red Hot Organization to benefit HIV/AIDS awareness initiatives.

His recordings have also received international radio airplay and placement in curated compilations outside Brazil.

== Musical style ==
Critics have noted Curumin’s synthesis of samba percussion, American funk basslines, psychedelic rock textures and electronic production. AllMusic describes his sound as combining “classic Brazilian songwriting with gritty, groove-oriented experimentation.”

== Discography ==
=== Studio albums ===
- Achados e Perdidos (2005)
- JapanPopShow (2008)
- Arrocha (2012)
- Boca (2017)
- Pedra de Selva (2024)

== Awards and nominations ==
- Latin Grammy Award nomination, Best Portuguese Language Rock or Alternative Album – Boca (2017)
