= Sambalanço =

Subgenre of samba

Sambalanço (a portmanteau of samba and balanço, meaning swing or beat in Portuguese) is a musical genre derived from samba that developed from the early 1950s to the mid-1960s in Brazil, especially in its two largest centers, São Paulo and Rio de Janeiro, reflecting the changes that this genre underwent after World War II to respond to new cultural demands brought about by the country's urbanization. Having as its roots samba, especially samba-exaltação, modified through the infusion of new elements from American jazz and Caribbean rhythms - the latter especially in the role played by wind instruments - sambalanço artists developed an extremely rhythmic and danceable sound, with extroverted and humorous themes.

== Bibliography ==
- Nestrovski, Arthur Rosenblat (2002). Música Popular Brasileira Hoje (in Portuguese). Vol. 50. Publifolha. ISBN 8574024058.
- Souza, Tarik (2010). "A bossa dançante do sambalanço". Revista USP (in Brazilian Portuguese) (87). São Paulo: University of São Paulo: 28–39. doi:10.11606/issn.2316-9036.v0i87p28-39.
