= Impose (magazine) =

Music magazine based in Kansas

- Categories: Music
- Founder: Derek Evers
- Founded: 2002
- Final issue: 2008 (print)
- Company: Answer Media
- Country: United States
- Language: English
- Website: imposemagazine.com
- OCLC: 607305438

Impose is an American Kansas-based website covering independent music and related culture. It was founded in 2002 as a magazine by Brooklyn, New York–based Derek Evers as a print-only magazine, and has since expanded to include a website and an affiliated record label. Since 2008, it has stopped printing a magazine.

In April 2016, the brand and website was sold to Kansas-based company Answer Media.
